= American Book Awards =

Literary award in the United States

- Date: 1978–present
- Country: United States
- Hosted by: Before Columbus Foundation
- Website: beforecolumbusfoundation.com

The American Book Awards are an American literary award that annually recognizes a set of books and people for "outstanding literary achievement". According to the 2010 awards press release, it is "a writers' award given by other writers" and "there are no categories, no nominees, and therefore no losers."

The Award is administered by the multi-cultural focused nonprofit Before Columbus Foundation, which established it in 1978 and inaugurated it in 1980. The Award honors excellence in American literature without restriction to race, sex, ethnic background, or genre. Previous winners include novelists, social scientists, philosophers, poets, and historians such as Dana Gioia, Toni Morrison, Edward Said, MacKenzie Bezos, Isabel Allende, bell hooks, Don DeLillo, Derrick Bell, Robin Kelley, Joy Harjo and Tommy J. Curry.

== National Book Awards ==
In 1980, the unrelated National Book Awards was renamed American Book Awards. In 1987 it was renamed back to National Book Awards. Other than having the same name during this seven-year period, the two awards have no relation.

== Recipients ==
=== 1980s ===
==== 1980 ====
- Douglas Woolf for Future Preconditional: A Collection
- Edward Dorn for Hello, La Jolla
- Jayne Cortez for Mouth on Paper
- Leslie Marmon Silko for Ceremony
- Mei-mei Berssenbrugge for Random Possession
- Milton Murayama for All I Asking for Is My Body
- Quincy Troupe for Snake Back Solos
- Rudolfo Anaya for Tortuga, a novel

==== 1981 ====
- Alta for Shameless Hussy
- Alan Chong Lau for Songs for Jadina
- Bienvenido N. Santos for Scent of Apples: A Collection of Stories
- Helen Adam for Turn Again to Me & Other Poems
- Lionel Mitchell for Traveling Light
- Miguel Algarín for On Call
- Nicholasa Mohr for Felita
- Peter Blue Cloud for Back Then Tomorrow
- Robert Kelly for The Time of Voice: Poems 1994–1996
- Rose Drachler for The Choice
- Susan Howe for The Liberties
- Toni Cade Bambara for The Salt Eaters

==== 1982 ====
- Al Young for Bodies and Soul
- Duane Niatum for Songs for the Harvester of Dreams: Poems
- E. L. Mayo for Collected Poems E L Mayo
- Frank Chin for The Chickencoop Chinaman and The Year of the Dragon
- Hilton Obenzinger for This Passover or the next, I will never be in Jerusalem
- Him Mark Lai, Genny Lim, Judy Yung for Island: Poetry and History of Chinese Immigrants on Angel Island, 1910–1940
- Jerome Rothenberg for Pre-Faces and Other Writings
- Joyce Carol Thomas for Marked by Fire
- Leroy Quintana for Paper Dance: 55 Latino Poets
- Lorna Dee Cervantes for Emplumada
- Ronald Phillip Tanaka for The Shino Suite: Japanese-American Poetry
- Russell Banks for Book of Jamaica
- Tato Laviera for Enclave

==== 1983 ====
- Barbara Christian for Black Women Novelists: The Development of a Tradition, 1892–1976
- Cecilia Liang for Chinese Folk Poetry
- Evangelina Vigil-Piñón for Thirty: An' Seen a Lot
- Harriet Rohmer for Legend of Food Mountain: LA Montana Del Alimento
- James D. Houston for Californians: Searching for the Golden State
- Jessica Tarahata Hagedorn for Pet food & tropical apparitions
- John A. Williams for Click Song, a novel
- Joy Kogawa for Obasan
- Judy Grahn for The Queen of Wands: Poetry
- Nash Candelaria for Not by the Sword
- Peter Guralnick for Lost Highway: Journeys and Arrivals of American Musicians
- Seán Ó Tuama for An Duanaire Sixteen Hundred to Nineteen Hundred: Poems of the Dispossessed

==== 1984 ====
- Cecil Brown for Days Without Weather
- Gary Snyder for Axe Handles: Poems
- Howard Schwartz, Mark Podwal for The Captive Soul of the Messiah: New Tales About Reb Nachman
- Imamu Amiri Baraka for Anthology of African American Women: Confirmation Men
- Jesús Colón for A Puerto Rican in New York, and Other Sketches
- Joseph Bruchac for Breaking Silence: An Anthology of Contemporary Asian-American Poets
- Maurice Kenny for The Mama Poems
- Mei-mei Berssenbrugge for The heat bird
- Miné Okubo for Citizen 13660
- Paule Marshall for Praisesong for the Widow
- Ruthanne Lum McCunn, You-shan Tang, Ellen Lai-shan Yeung for Pie-Biter
- Thomas McGrath for Echoes inside the labyrinth
- Venkatesh Kulkarni for Naked in Deccan
- William J. Kennedy for O Albany!

==== 1985 ====
- Angela Jackson for Solo in the Box Car Third Floor E
- Arnold Genthe, John Kuo Wei Tchen for Genthe's Photographs of San Francisco's Old Chinatown
- Colleen J. McElroy for Queen of the Ebony Isles
- Gary Soto for Living Up The Street
- Peter Irons for Justice at War
- Keiho Soga, Taisanboku Mori, Sojin Takei, Muin Ozaki for Poets Behind Barbed Wire
- Louise Erdrich for Love Medicine, a novel
- Maureen Owen for Amelia Earhart
- May Sarton for At Seventy: A Journal
- Robert Edward Duncan for Ground Work: Before the War
- Ron Jones for Say Ray
- Sandra Cisneros for The House on Mango Street
- Sonia Sanchez for Homegirls and Handgrenades
- Julia Vinograd for The Book of Jerusalem
- William Oandasan for Round Valley Songs

==== 1986 ====
- Anna Lee Walters for The Sun Is Not Merciful: Short Stories
- Cherríe Moraga, Gloria Anzaldúa for This Bridge Called My Back: Writings by Radical Women of Color
- Helen Barolini for The Dream Book: An Anthology of Writing by Italian American Women
- Jeff Hannusch for I Hear You Knockin : The Sound of New Orleans Rhythm and Blues
- Linda Hogan for Seeing Through the Sun
- Miguel Algarín for Time's Now/Ya Es Tiempo
- Natasha Borovsky for A Daughter of the Nobility
- Raymond Federman for Smiles on Washington Square: A Love Story of Sorts
- Susan Howe for My Emily Dickinson
- Terence Winch for Irish Musicians/American Friends
- Toshio Mori for Yokohama, California

==== 1987 ====
- Ai for SIN
- Ana Castillo for The Mixquiahuala Letters
- Cyn Zarco for Cir'cum.nav'i.ga'tion
- Daniel McGuire for Portrait of Little Boy in darkness
- Dorothy Bryant for Confessions of Madame Psyche: Memoirs and Letters of Mei-Li Murrow
- Etheridge Knight for The Essential Etheridge Knight
- Gary Giddins for Celebrating Bird: The Triumph Of Charlie Parker
- Harvey Pekar for The New American Splendor Anthology: From Off the Streets of Cleveland
- James Welch for Fools Crow
- John Wieners for Selected Poems: 1958–1984
- Juan Felipe Herrera for Face Games
- Lucia Chiavola Birnbaum for liberazione della donna: feminism in Italy
- Michael Mayo for Practicing Angels: A Contemporary Anthology of San Francisco Bay Area Poetry
- Septima Poinsette Clark, Cynthia Stokes Brown for Ready from Within: A First Person Narrative
- Terry McMillan for Mama

==== 1988 ====
- Allison Blakely for Russia and the Negro: Blacks in Russian History and Thought
- Charles Olson for The Collected Poems of Charles Olson: Excluding the Maximus Poems
- Daisy Bates for The Long Shadow of Little Rock: A Memoir
- David Halberstam for The Reckoning
- Edward Sanders for Thirsting for Peace in a Raging Century: Poems 1961–1985
- Gerald Vizenor for Griever: An American Monkey King in China
- Jimmy Santiago Baca for Martin & Meditations on the South Valley
- Kesho Y. Scott, Cherry Muhanji, Egyirba High for Tight Spaces
- Marlon K. Hom for Songs of Gold Mountain: Cantonese Rhymes from San Francisco Chinatown
- Benjamin Hoff for The Singing Creek Where the Willows Grow: The Mystical Nature Diary of Opal Whiteley
- Ronald Sukenick for Down and in: Life in the Underground
- Salvatore La Puma for The Boys of Bensonhurst
- Toni Morrison for Beloved
- Wing Tek Lum, Tek Lum Lum for Expounding the Doubtful Points

==== 1989 ====
- Alma Luz Villanueva for The Ultraviolet Sky
- Askia M. Touré for From the Pyramids to the Projects: Poems of Genocide and Resistance!
- Audre Lorde for A Burst of Light
- Carolyn Lau for Wode Shuofa: My Way of Speaking
- Emory Elliott for Columbia Literary History of the United States
- Eduardo Galeano for Genesis
- Frank Chin for The Chinaman Pacific and Frisco R.R. Co.
- Henry Louis Gates for The Signifying Monkey: A Theory of Afro-American Literary Criticism
- Isabel Allende for Eva Luna
- J. California Cooper for Homemade Love
- Jennifer Stone for Stone's Throw
- Josephine Gattuso Hendin for The Right Thing to Do
- Leslie Scalapino for way
- Shuntaro Tanikawa for Floating the River in Melancholy
- Charles Fanning for The Exiles of Erin: Nineteenth-Century Irish-American Fiction
- William Minoru Hohri for Repairing America: An Account of the Movement for Japanese American Redress

=== 1990s ===
==== 1990 ====
- Adrienne Kennedy for People Who Led to My Plays
- Barbara Grizzuti Harrison for Italian Days
- Daniela Gioseffi for Women on War (Essential Voices for the Nuclear Age)
- Elizabeth Woody for Hand into Stone: Poems
- Hualing Nieh for Mulberry and Peach: Two Women of China
- Itabari Njeri for Every Good-Bye Ain't Gone
- James M. Freeman for Hearts of Sorrow: Vietnamese-American Lives
- John C. Walter, J. Raymond Jones for The Harlem Fox: J. Raymond Jones and Tammany, 1920–1970
- John Norton for Light at the End of the Bog
- José Emilio González for Vivar a Hostos
- Sergei Kan for Symbolic Immortality: The Tlingit Potlatch of the Nineteenth Century
- Lloyd A. Thompson for Romans and Blacks
- Martin Bernal for Black Athena: The Afroasiatic Roots of Classical Civilization
- Michelle T. Clinton, Sesshu Foster for Invocation L.A.: Urban Multicultural Poetry
- Miles Davis for Miles: The Autobiography
- Paula Gunn Allen for Spider Woman's Granddaughters: Traditional Tales and Contemporary Writing by Native American Women
- Shirley Geok-lin Lim, Mayumi Tsutakawa, Margarita Donnelly for The Forbidden Stitch: An Asian American Women's Anthology

==== 1991 ====
- Alejandro Murguía for Southern Front
- bell hooks for Yearning: Race, Gender, and Cultural Politics
- Bruce Wright for Black Robes, White Justice: Why Our Legal System Doesn't Work for Blacks
- Charley Trujillo for Soldados: Chicanos in Viet Nam
- D. H. Melhem for Heroism in the New Black Poetry: Introductions & Interviews
- Deborah Keenan for Looking for Home: Women Writing About Exile
- Jessica Hagedorn for Dogeaters
- John Edgar Wideman for Philadelphia Fire, a novel
- Joy Harjo for In Mad Love and War
- Karen Tei Yamashita for Through the Arc of the Rain Forest
- Lucia Berlin for Homesick: New and Selected Stories
- Mary Crow Dog for Lakota Woman
- Meridel Le Sueur for Harvest Song: Collected Essays and Stories
- Mill Hunk Herald Collective for Overtime: Punchin' Out With the Mill Hunk Herald Magazine
- Nora Marks Dauenhauer, Richard Dauenhauer for Haa Tuwunaagu Yis, for Healing Our Spirit: Tlingit Oratory
- R. Baxter Miller for The Art and Imagination of Langston Hughes
- Thomas Centolella for Terra Firma

==== 1992 ====
- A'Lelia Perry Bundles for Madam C.J. Walker
- Art Spiegelman for The Complete Maus: A Survivor's Tale
- Benjamin Alire Sáenz for Calendar of Dust
- Donna J. Haraway for Simians, Cyborgs, and Women: The Reinvention of Nature
- Fritjof Capra for Belonging to the universe: Explorations on the frontiers of science and spirituality
- José Antonio Burciaga for Undocumented Love/Amor Indocumentado: A Personal Anthology of Poetry
- Keith Gilyard for Voices of the Self: A Study of Language Competence
- Lucy Thompson for To the American Indian: Reminiscences of a Yurok Woman
- Norma Field for In the Realm of a Dying Emperor: Japan at Century's End
- Peter Bacho for Cebu
- Peter Kalifornsky for Dena'ina Legacy: K'tl'egh'i Sukdu: The Collected Writings of Peter Kalifornsky
- Raymond Andrews for Jessie and Jesus and Cousin Claire
- Sandra Scofield for Beyond Deserving
- Sheila Hamanaka for Journey
- Stephen R. Fox for The Unknown Internment: An Oral History of the Relocation of Italian Americans During World War II
- Steven R. Carter for Hansberry's Drama: Commitment Amid Complexity,
- Verlyn Klinkenborg for The Last Fine Time
- William B. Branch, Amiri Baraka, August Wilson for Black Thunder: An Anthology of African-American Drama

==== 1993 ====
- Asake Bomani, Belvie Rooks for Paris Connections: African American Artists in Paris
- Christopher Mogil, Peter Woodrow for We Gave Away a Fortune
- Cornel West for Prophetic Thought in Postmodern Times
- Denise Giardina for Unquiet Earth
- Diane Glancy for Claiming Breath
- Eugene B. Redmond for The Eye in the Ceiling
- Francisco X. Alarcón for Snake Poems
- Gerald Graff for Beyond the Culture Wars: How Teaching the Conflicts Can Revitalize American Education
- Jack Beatty for The Rascal King: The Life and Times of James Michael Curley
- Leroy V. Quintana for The History of Home
- Katherine Peter for Neets'aii Gwiindaii: Living in the Chandalar Country
- Nelson George for Elevating the Game: Black Men and Basketball
- Ninotchka Rosca for Twice Blessed, a novel

==== 1994 ====
- Giose Rimanelli for Benedetta in Guysterland
- Eric Drooker for Flood!: A Novel in Pictures
- Graciela Limón for In Search of Bernabe
- Gregory J. Reed for Economic Empowerment Through the Church
- Janet Campbell Hale for Bloodlines: Odyssey of a Native Daughter
- Jill Nelson for Volunteer Slavery: My Authentic Negro Experience
- Lawson Fusao Inada for Legends from Camp
- Nicole Blackman for Aloud: Voices from the Nuyorican Poets Cafe
- Paul Gilroy for The Black Atlantic: Modernity and Double-Consciousness
- Ronald Takaki for A Different Mirror: A History of Multicultural America
- Rose L. Glickman for Daughters of Feminists
- Tino Villanueva for Scene from the Movie GIANT
- Virginia L. Kroll for Wood-Hoopoe Willie

==== 1995 ====
- Abraham Rodriguez for Spidertown, a novel
- Herb Boyd, Robert L. Allen for Brotherman: The Odyssey of Black Men in America—An Anthology
- Denise Chávez for Face of an Angel
- John Egerton for Speak Now Against the Day: The Generation Before the Civil Rights Movement in the South
- John Ross for Rebellion from the Roots: Indian Uprising in Chiapas
- Thomas Avena for Life Sentences: Writers, Artists, and AIDS
- Linda Raymond for Rocking the Babies, a novel
- Li-Young Lee for The Winged Seed: A Remembrance
- Marianna De Marco Torgovnick for Crossing Ocean Parkway
- Marnie Mueller for Green Fires: Assault on Eden: A Novel of the Ecuadorian Rainforest
- Peter Quinn for Banished Children of Eve, A Novel of Civil War New York
- Sandra Martz for I Am Becoming the Woman I've Wanted
- Gordon Henry Jr. for The Light People
- Tricia Rose for Black Noise: Rap Music and Black Culture in Contemporary America

==== 1996 ====
- Agate Nesaule for A Woman in Amber: Healing the Trauma of War and Exile
- Arthur Sze for Archipelago
- Chang-Rae Lee for Native Speaker
- Chitra Banerjee Divakaruni for Arranged Marriage
- E. J. Miller Laino for Girl Hurt
- Glenn C. Loury for One by One from the Inside Out: Race and Responsibility in America
- James W. Loewen for Lies My Teacher Told Me: Everything Your American History Textbook Got Wrong
- Joe Sacco, Edward Said for Palestine
- Kimiko Hahn for The Unbearable Heart
- Maria Espinosa for Longing
- Robert Viscusi for Astoria
- Sherman Alexie for Reservation Blues
- Ron Sakolsky, Fred Weihan Ho for Sounding Off!: Music as Resistance / Rebellion / Revolution
- Stephanie Cowell for The Physician of London: The Second Part of the Seventeenth-Century Trilogy of Nicholas Cooke
- William H. Gass for The Tunnel

==== 1997 ====
- Alurista for Et Tu ... Raza
- Derrick Bell for Gospel Choirs: Psalms Of Survival In An Alien Land Called Home
- Dorothy Barresi for The Post-Rapture Diner
- Guillermo Gómez-Peña for The New World Border: Prophecies, Poems, and Loqueras for the End of the Century
- Louis Owens for Nightland
- Martín Espada for Imagine the Angels of Bread: Poems
- Montserrat Fontes for Dreams of the Centaur, a novel
- Noel Ignatiev for Race Traitor
- Shirley Geok-lin Lim for Among the White Moon Faces: An Asian-American Memoir of Homelands
- Sunaina Maira for Contours of the Heart: South Asians Map North America
- Thulani Davis for Maker of Saints
- Tom De Haven for Derby Dugan's Depression Funnies, a novel
- William M. Banks for Black Intellectuals: Race and Responsibility in American Life
- Brenda Knight for Women of the Beat Generation: The Writers, Artists and Muses at the Heart of a Revolution

==== 1998 ====
- Allison Adelle Hedge Coke for Dog Road Woman
- Angela Y. Davis for Blues Legacies and Black Feminism: Gertrude "Ma" Rainey, Bessie Smith, and Billie Holiday
- Brenda Marie Osbey for All Saints: New and Selected Poems
- Don DeLillo for Underworld
- Jim Barnes for On Native Ground: Memoirs and Impressions
- John A. Williams for Safari West: Poems
- Nancy Rawles for Love Like Gumbo
- Nora Okja Keller for Comfort Woman
- Sandra Benitez for Bitter Grounds, a novel
- Scott DeVeaux for The Birth of Bebop: A Social and Musical History
- Thomas Lynch for The Undertaking: Life Studies from the Dismal Trade

==== 1999 ====
- Alice McDermott for Charming Billy
- Anna Linzer for Ghost Dancing
- Brian Ward for Just My Soul Responding: Rhythm and Blues, Black Consciousness, and Race Relations
- Chiori Santiago for Home to Medicine Mountain
- E. Donald Two-Rivers for Survivor's Medicine: Short Stories
- Edwidge Danticat for The Farming of Bones
- Judith Roche, Meg McHutchison for First Fish, First People: Salmon Tales of the North Pacific Rim
- Gioia Timpanelli for Sometimes the Soul: Two Novellas of Sicily
- Gloria Naylor for The Men of Brewster Place, a novel
- James D. Houston for The Last Paradise
- Jerry Lipka, Gerald V. Mohatt, Ciulistet Group for Transforming the Culture of Schools: Yup¡k Eskimo Examples
- Trey Ellis for Right Here, Right Now
- Josip Novakovich for Salvation and Other Disasters
- Lauro Flores for The Floating Borderlands: Twenty-Five Years of U.S. Hispanic Literature
- Luís Alberto Urrea for Nobody's Son: Notes from an American Life
- Nelson George for Hip Hop America: Hip Hop and the Molding of Black Generation X
- Speer Morgan for The Freshour Cylinders
- Gary Gach for What Book!?: Buddha Poems from Beat to Hiphop
- Chiori Santiago, author, Judith Lowry, illustrator, Home to Medicine Mountain

=== 2000s ===
==== 2000 ====
- Esther G. Belin for From the Belly of My Beauty
- Allan J. Ryan for The Trickster Shift: Humour and Irony in Contemporary Native Art
- Andrés Montoya for The Ice Worker Sings and Other Poems
- Camille Peri, Kate Moses for Mothers Who Think: Tales of Real-Life Parenthood
- David A. J. Richards for Italian American: The Racializing of an Ethnic Identity
- David Toop for Exotica
- Elva Trevino Hart for Barefoot Heart: Stories of a Migrant Child
- Emil Guillermo for Amok: Essays from an Asian American Perspective; With an Introduction by Ishmael Reed
- Frank Chin for The Chinaman Pacific & Frisco R.R. Co.
- Helen Thomas for Front Row at the White House : My Life and Times
- Janisse Ray for Ecology of a Cracker Childhood
- John Russell Rickford, Russell John Rickford for Spoken Soul: The Story of Black English
- Leroy TeCube for Year in Nam: A Native American Soldier's Story
- Lois-Ann Yamanaka for Heads By Harry
- Michael Lally for It's Not Nostalgia: Poetry & Prose
- Michael Patrick MacDonald for All Souls: A Family Story from Southie
- Rahna Reiko Rizzuto for Why She Left Us, a novel
- Robert Creeley for The Collected Poems of Robert Creeley, 1975–2005
- Editor/Publisher: Ronald Sukenick
- Jack E. White, Journalism
- Frank Chin, Lifetime Achievement
- Robert Creeley, Lifetime Achievement

==== 2001 ====
- Amanda J. Cobb for Listening to Our Grandmothers' Stories: The Bloomfield Academy for Chickasaw Females, 1852–1949
- Andrea Dworkin for Scapegoat: The Jews, Israel, and Women's Liberation
- Carolyne Wright for Seasons of Mangoes and Brainfire
- Chalmers Johnson for Blowback, Second Edition: The Costs and Consequences of American Empire
- Cheri Register for Packinghouse Daughter: A Memoir
- Chris Ware for Jimmy Corrigan: The Smartest Kid on Earth
- Diana Garcia for When Living Was a Labor Camp
- Elizabeth Nunez for Bruised Hibiscus
- Janet McAdams for Island of Lost Luggage
- Philip Whalen for Overtime: Selected Poems
- Russell Leong for Phoenix Eyes and Other Stories
- Sandra M. Gilbert for Kissing the Bread: New and Selected Poems, 1969–1999
- Ted Joans for Teducation
- Tillie Olsen for Silences
- William S. Penn for Killing Time With Strangers
- Malcolm Margolin, Editor
- Ted Joans, Lifetime Achievement
- Tillie Olsen, Lifetime Achievement
- Philip Whalen Lifetime Achievement

==== 2002 ====
- Aaron A. Abeyta, Colcha
- Susanne Antonetta, The Body Toxic: An Environmental Memoir
- Rilla Askew, Fire in Beulah
- Tananarive Due, The Living Blood
- Gloria Frym, Homeless at Home
- Dana Gioia, Interrogations at Noon
- LeAnne Howe, Shell Shaker
- Alex Kuo, Lipstick and Other Stories
- Michael N. Nagler, Is There No Other Way? The Search for a Nonviolent Future
- Donald Phelps, Reading the Funnies : Looking at Great Cartoonists Throughout the First Half of the 20th Century
- Al Young, The Sound of Dreams Remembered: Poems, 1990–2000
- Jessel Miller, Angels in the Vineyards
- Lerone Bennett, Lifetime Achievement
- Jack Hirschman, Lifetime Achievement

==== 2003 ====
- Kevin Baker, Paradise Alley
- Debra Magpie Earling, Perma Red
- Daniel Ellsberg, Secrets: A Memoir of Vietnam and the Pentagon Papers
- Rick Heide, ed., Under the Fifth Sun: Latino Literature from California
- Igor Krupnik, Willis Walunga, Vera Metcalf, and Lars Krutak, eds, Akuzilleput Igaqullghet, Our Words Put to Paper: Sourcebook in St. Lawrence Island Yupik Heritage and History
- Alejandro Murguía, This War Called Love: Nine Stories
- Jack Newfield, The Full Rudy: The Man, the Myth, the Mania
- Joseph Papaleo, Italian Stories
- Eric Porter, What Is This Thing Called Jazz?: African American Musicians as Artists, Critics, and Activists
- Jewell Parker Rhodes, Douglass' Women, a novel
- Rachel Simon, Riding the Bus with My Sister: A True Life Journey
- Velma Wallis, Raising Ourselves: A Gwich'in Coming of Age Story from the Yukon River
- Max Rodriguez, QBR: The Black Book Review

==== 2004 ====
- Diana Abu-Jaber, Crescent, a novel
- David Cole, Enemy Aliens: Double Standards And Constitutional Freedoms In The War On Terrorism
- Charisse Jones and Kumea Shorter-Gooden, Shifting: The Double Lives of Black Women in America
- Kristin Hunter Lattany, Breaking Away
- A. Robert Lee, Multicultural American Literature: Comparative Black, Native, Latino/a and Asian American Fictions
- Diane Sher Lutovich, What I Stole
- Ruth Ozeki, All Over Creation
- Renato Rosaldo, Prayer to Spider Woman / Rezo a la Mujer Arana
- Scott Saul, Freedom Is, Freedom Ain't: Jazz and the Making of the Sixties
- Michael Walsh, And All the Saints

==== 2005 ====
- Bernard W. Bell, The Contemporary African American Novel: Its Folk Roots And Modern Literary Branches
- Cecelie Berry, Rise Up Singing: Black Women Writers on Motherhood
- Jeff Chang, Can't Stop Won't Stop: A History of the Hip-Hop Generation
- Julie Chibbaro, Redemption
- Richard A. Clarke, Against All Enemies: Inside America's War on Terror
- Alisha S. Drabek and Karen R. Adams, The Red Cedar of Afognak, A Driftwood Journey
- Ralph M. Flores, The Horse in the Kitchen: Stories of a Mexican-American Family
- Hiroshi Kashiwagi, Swimming in the American: A Memoir And Selected Writings
- Robert F. Kennedy, Jr., Crimes Against Nature: How George W. Bush and His Corporate Pals Are Plundering the Country and Hijacking Our Democracy
- Don Lee, Country of Origin, a novel
- Lamont B. Steptoe, A Long Movie of Shadows
- Don West, No Lonesome Road: Selected Prose and Poems, eds Jeff Biggers and George Brosi
- Journalism: Bill Berkowitz

==== 2006 ====
- MacKenzie Bezos, The Testing of Luther Albright, a novel
- Matt Briggs, Shoot the Buffalo
- David P. Diaz, The White Tortilla: Reflections of a Second-Generation Mexican-American
- Darryl Dickson-Carr, The Columbia Guide to Contemporary African American Fiction
- Thomas Ferraro, Feeling Italian: The Art of Ethnicity in America
- Tim Z. Hernandez, Skin Tax
- Josh Kun, Audiotopia: Music, Race, and America
- P. Lewis, Nate
- Peter Metcalfe, Gumboot Determination: The Story of the Southeast Alaska Regional Health Consortium
- Kevin J. Mullen, The Toughest Gang in Town: Police Stories from Old San Francisco
- Doris Seale and Beverly Slapin, eds., A Broken Flute: The Native Experience in Books for Children
- Matthew Shenoda, Somewhere Else
- Carlton T. Spiller, Scalding Heart
- Chris Hamilton-Emery, Editor
- Jay Wright, Lifetime Achievement

==== 2007 ====
- Daniel Cassidy, How the Irish Invented Slang: The Secret Language of the Crossroads
- Michael Eric Dyson, Come Hell or High Water: Hurricane Katrina and the Color of Disaster
- Rigoberto González, Butterfly Boy: Memories of a Chicano Mariposa
- Reyna Grande, Across a Hundred Mountains, a novel
- Ernestine Hayes, Blonde Indian: An Alaska Native Memoir
- Patricia Klindienst, The Earth Knows My Name: Food, Culture, and Sustainability in the Gardens of Ethnic Americans
- Gary Panter, Jimbo's Inferno
- Jeffrey F. L. Partridge, Beyond Literary Chinatown
- Judith Roche, Wisdom of the Body
- Kali VanBaale, The Space Between

==== 2008 ====
- Moustafa Bayoumi, How Does It Feel to Be a Problem Being Young and Arab in America
- Douglas A. Blackmon, Slavery by Another Name: The Re-Enslavement of Black Americans from the Civil War to World War II
- Jonathan Curiel, Al’ America: Travels Through America's Arab and Islamic Roots
- Nora Marks Dauenhauer, Richard Dauenhauer, and Lydia T. Black. Anóoshi Lingít Aaní Ká. Russians in Tlingit America: The Battles of Sitka, 1802 and 1804
- Maria Mazziotti Gillan, All That Lies Between Us
- Nikki Giovanni, The Collected Poetry of Nikki Giovanni: 1968–1998
- C. S. Giscombe, Prairie Style
- Angela Jackson, Where I Must Go, a novel
- L. Luis Lopez, Each Month I Sing
- Tom Lutz, Doing Nothing: A History of Loafers, Loungers, Slackers, and Bums in America
- Fae Myenne Ng, Steer Toward Rock
- Yuko Taniguchi, The Ocean in the Closet
- Lorenzo Thomas, Don't Deny My Name: Words and Music and the Black Intellectual Tradition, ed. Aldon Lynn Nielsen
- Frank B. Wilderson III, Incognegro: A Memoir of Exile and Apartheid
- J. J. Phillips, Lifetime Achievement

==== 2009 ====
- Houston A. Baker, Jr., Betrayal: How Black Intellectuals Have Abandoned the Ideals of the Civil Right Era
- Danit Brown, Ask for a Convertible
- Jericho Brown, Please
- José Antonio Burciaga, The Last Supper of Chicano Heroes: Selected Works of José Antonio Burciaga, eds Mimi R. Gladstein and Daniel Chacón
- Claire Hope Cummings, Uncertain Peril: Genetic Engineering and the Future of Seeds
- Stella Pope Duarte, If I Die in Juarez
- Linda Gregg, All of It Singing: New and Selected Poems
- Suheir Hammad, Breaking Poems
- Richard Holmes, The Age of Wonder
- George E. Lewis, A Power Stronger than Itself: The A.A.C.M. and American Experimental Music
- Patricia Santana, Ghosts of El Grullo
- Jack Spicer, My Vocabulary Did This to Me: The Collected Poetry of Jack Spicer, ed. Peter Gizzi and Kevin Killian
- Miguel Algarín, Lifetime Achievement

=== 2010s ===
==== 2010 ====
- Amiri Baraka, Digging: The Afro-American Soul of American Classical Music
- Sherwin Bitsui, Flood Song
- Nancy Carnevale, A New Language, A New World: Italian Immigrants in the United States, 1890–1945
- Dave Eggers, Zeitoun
- Sesshu Foster, World Ball Notebook
- Stephen D. Gutierrez, Live from Fresno y Los
- Victor LaValle, The Big Machine
- François Mandeville, This Is What They Say, translated by Ron Scollon from Chipewyan
- Bich Minh Nguyen, Short Girls
- Franklin Rosemont and Robin D. G. Kelley, eds., Black, Brown, & Beige: Surrealist Writings from Africa and the Diaspora
- Jerome Rothenberg and Jeffrey C. Robinson, eds., Poems for the Millennium: Volume Three: The University of California Book of Romantic and Postromantic Poetry
- Kathryn Waddell Takara, Pacific Raven: Hawai`i Poems
- Pamela Uschuk, Crazy Love: New Poems
- Katha Politt, Lifetime Achievement
- Quincy Troupe, Lifetime Achievement

==== 2011 ====
- Keith Gilyard, John Oliver Killens
- Akbar Ahmed, Journey Into America: The Challenge of Islam
- Camille Dungy, Suck on the Marrow
- Karen Tei Yamashita, I Hotel
- William W. Cook and James Tatum, African American Writers and Classical Tradition
- Gerald Vizenor, Shrouds of White Earth
- Eric Gansworth, Extra Indians
- Ivan Argüelles, The Death of Stalin
- Geoffrey Alan Argent, ed., The Complete Plays of Jean Racine: Volume 1: The Fratricides, translated by Argent from French
- Neela Vaswani, You Have Given Me a Country
- Sasha Pimentel Chacón, Insides She Swallowed
- Miriam Jiménez Román and Juan Flores, eds., The Afro-Latin@ Reader: History of Culture in the United States
- Carmen Giménez Smith, Bring Down the Little Birds
- Luis Valdez, Lifetime Achievement
- John A. Williams, Lifetime Achievement

==== 2012 ====
- Annia Ciezadlo, Day of Honey: A Memoir of Food, Love, and War
- Arlene Kim, What Have You Done to Our Ears to Make Us Hear Echoes?
- Ed Bok Lee, Whorled
- Adilifu Nama, Super Black: American Pop Culture and Black Superheroes
- Rob Nixon, Slow Violence and the Environmentalism of the Poor
- Shann Ray, American Masculine
- Alice Rearden, translator; Ann Fienup-Riordan, ed., Qaluyaarmiuni Nunamtenek Qanemciput: Our Nelson Island Stories
- Touré, Who's Afraid of Post-Blackness? What It Means to Be Black Now
- Amy Waldman, The Submission
- Mary Winegarden, The Translator's Sister
- Kevin Young, Ardency: A Chronicle of the Amistad Rebels
- Eugene B. Redmond, Lifetime Achievement

==== 2013 ====
- Will Alexander, Singing In Magnetic Hoofbeat: Essays, Prose, Texts, Interviews, and a Lecture, Essay Press
- Jacob M. Appel, The Man Who Wouldn't Stand Up, Cargo
- Philip P. Choy, San Francisco Chinatown: A Guide To Its History & Architecture, City Lights
- Amanda Coplin, The Orchardist, HarperCollins
- Natalie Diaz, When My Brother Was An Aztec, Copper Canyon Press
- Louise Erdrich, The Round House, HarperCollins
- Alan Gilbert, Black Patriots and Loyalists: Fighting for Emancipation in the War for Independence, University of Chicago
- Judy Grahn, A Simple Revolution: The Making of an Activist Poet, Aunt Lute Books
- Joy Harjo, Crazy Brave: A Memoir, W.W. Norton & Co.
- Demetria Martinez, The Block Captain's Daughter, University of Oklahoma Press
- Daniel Abdal-Hayy Moore, Blood Songs, The Ecstatic Exchange
- dg nanouk okpik, Corpse Whale, University of Arizona Press
- Seth Rosenfeld, Subversives: The FBI's War On Student Radical and Reagan's Rise to Power, Farrar, Straus & Giroux
- Christopher B. Teuton, Cherokee Stories of the Turtle Island Liar's Club, University of North Carolina
- Lew Welch, Ring of Bone: Collected Poems, City Lights
- Ivan Argüelles, Lifetime Achievement
- Greil Marcus, Lifetime Achievement
- Floyd Salas, Lifetime Achievement

==== 2014 ====
- Andrew Bacevich, Breach of Trust: How Americans Failed Their Soldiers and Their Country, Metropolitan Books
- Joshua Bloom and Waldo E. Martin, Jr., Black Against Empire; The History and Politics of the Black Panther Party, University of California Press
- Juan Delgado (poetry) and Thomas McGovern (photography), Vital Signs, Heyday Books
- Alex Espinoza, The Five Acts of Diego León, Random House
- Jonathan Scott Holloway, Jim Crow Wisdom: Memory and Identity in Black America Since 1940, University of North Carolina Press
- Joan Naviyuk Kane, Hyperboreal, University of Pittsburgh Press
- Jamaica Kincaid, See Now Then, Farrar, Straus and Giroux
- Tanya Olson, Boyishly, YesYes Books
- Sterling D. Plumpp, Home/Bass, Third World Press
- Emily Raboteau, Searching For Zion: The Quest for Home in the African Diaspora, Atlantic Monthly Press
- Jerome Rothenberg with Heriberto Yepez, Eye of Witness: A Jerome Rothenberg Reader, Commonwealth Books
- Nick Turse, Kill Anything That Moves: The Real American War in Vietnam, Metropolitan Books
- Margaret Wrinkle, Wash, Atlantic Monthly Press
- Koon Woon, Water Chasing Water, Kaya Press
- Armond White, Anti-Censorship Award
- Michael Parenti, Lifetime Achievement

==== 2015 ====
- Hisham Aidi, Rebel Music: Race, Empire, and the New Muslim Youth Culture (Vintage)
- Arlene Biala, her beckoning hands (Word Poetry)
- Arthur Dong, Forbidden City, USA: Chinese American Nightclubs, 1936-1970 (DeepFocus Productions)
- Roxanne Dunbar-Ortiz, An Indigenous Peoples' History of the United States (Beacon Press)
- Peter J. Harris, The Black Man of Happiness (Black Man of Happiness Project)
- Marlon James, A Brief History of Seven Killings (Riverhead Books)
- Naomi Klein, This Changes Everything: Capitalism vs. The Climate (Simon & Schuster)
- Laila Lalami, The Moor's Account (Pantheon)
- Manuel Luis Martinez, Los Duros (Floricanto Press)
- Craig Santos Perez, from unincorporated territory [guma’] (Omnidawn)
- Carlos Santana with Ashley Kahn and Hal Miller, The Universal Tone: Bringing My Story to Light (Little, Brown and Company)
- Ira Sukrungruang, Southside Buddhist (University of Tampa Press)
- Astra Taylor, The People's Platform: Taking Back Power and Culture in the Digital Age (Henry Holt)
- Anne Waldman, Lifetime Achievement

==== 2016 ====
- Laura Da', Tributaries (University of Arizona)
- Susan Muaddi Darraj, Curious Land: Stories from Home (University of Massachusetts)
- Deepa Iyer, We Too Sing America: South Asian, Arab, Muslim, and Sikh Immigrants Shape Our Multicultural Future (The New Press)
- Mat Johnson, Loving Day (Spiegel & Grau)
- John Keene, Counternarratives (New Directions)
- William J. Maxwell, F.B. Eyes: How J. Edgar Hoover's Ghostreaders Framed African American Literature (Princeton University)
- Lauret Savoy, Trace: Memory, History, Race, and the American Landscape (Counterpoint)
- Ned Sublette and Constance Sublette, The American Slave Coast: A History of the Slave-Breeding Industry (Lawrence Hill Books)
- Jesús Salvador Treviño, Return to Arroyo Grande (Arte Público)
- Nick Turse, Tomorrow's Battlefield: U.S. Proxy Wars and Secret Ops in Africa (Haymarket Books)
- Ray Young Bear, Manifestation Wolverine: The Collected Poetry of Ray Young Bear (Open Road Integrated Media)
- Louise Meriwether, Lifetime Achievement
- Lyra Monteiro and Nancy Isenberg, Walter & Lillian Lowenfels Criticism Award
- Chiitaanibah Johnson, Andrew Hope Award

==== 2017 ====
- Rabia Chaudry Adnan's Story: The Search for Truth and Justice After Serial (St. Martin's Press)
- Flores A. Forbes Invisible Men: A Contemporary Slave Narrative in the Era of Mass Incarceration (Skyhorse Publishing)
- Yaa Gyasi Homegoing (Knopf)
- Holly Hughes Passings (Expedition Press)
- Randa Jarrar Him, Me, Muhammad Ali (Sarabande Books)
- Bernice L. McFadden The Book of Harlan (Akashic Books)
- Brian D. McInnes Sounding Thunder: The Stories of Francis Pegahmagabow (Michigan State University Press)
- Patrick Phillips Blood at the Root: A Racial Cleansing in America (W. W. Norton & Company)
- Vaughn Rasberry Race and the Totalitarian Century: Geopolitics in the Black Literary Imagination (Harvard University Press)
- Marc Anthony Richardson Year of the Rat (Fiction Collective Two)
- Shawna Yang Ryan Green Island (Knopf)
- Ruth Sergel See You in the Streets: Art, Action, and Remembering the Triangle Shirtwaist Factory Fire (University of Iowa Press)
- Solmaz Sharif Look (Graywolf Press)
- Adam Soldofsky Memory Foam (Disorder Press)
- Alfredo Véa The Mexican Flyboy (University of Oklahoma Press)
- Dean Wong Seeing the Light: Four Decades in Chinatown (Chin Music Press)
- Nancy Mercado Lifetime Achievement
- Ammiel Alcalay Editor/Publisher Award: Lost & Found: The CUNY Poetics Document Initiative

==== 2018 ====
- Thi Bui The Best We Could Do: An Illustrated Memoir (Harry N. Abrams)
- Rachelle Cruz God's Will for Monsters (Inlandia Books)
- Tommy Curry The Man-Not: Race, Class, Genre, and the Dilemmas of Black Manhood (Temple University Press)
- Tongo Eisen-Martin Heaven Is All Goodbyes (City Lights)
- Dana Naone Hall Life of the Land: Articulations of a Native Writer (University of Hawaii)
- Kelly Lytle Hernández City of Inmates: Conquest, Rebellion, and the Rise of Human Caging in Los Angeles, 1771-1965 (University of North Carolina)
- Victor LaValle The Changeling: A Novel (Spiegel & Grau)
- Bojan Louis Currents (BkMk Press)
- Valeria Luiselli Tell Me How It Ends: An Essay in Forty Questions (Coffee House Press)
- Cathryn Josefina Merla-Watson and B. V. Olguín Altermundos Latin@ Speculative Literature, Film, and Popular Culture (UCLA Chicano Studies Research Center Press)
- Tiya Miles The Dawn of Detroit: A Chronicle of Slavery and Freedom in the City of the Straits (The New Press)
- Tommy Pico Nature Poem (Tin House Books)
- Rena Priest Patriarchy Blues (MoonPath Press)
- Joseph Rios Shadowboxing: poems & impersonations (Omnidawn)
- Sunaura Taylor Beasts of Burden: Animal and Disability Liberation (The New Press)
- Sequoyah Guess Lifetime Achievement
- Kellie Jones South of Pico: African American Artists in Los Angeles in the 1960s and 1970s (Duke University Press): Walter & Lillian Lowenfels Criticism Award
- Charles F. Harris Editor/Publisher Award
- Rob Rogers Anti-Censorship Award
- Heroes Are Gang Leaders Oral Literature Award

==== 2019 ====
- Frank Abe, Greg Robinson, and Floyd Cheung John Okada: The Life & Rediscovered Work of the Author of No-No Boy (University of Washington Press)
- May-lee Chai Useful Phrases for Immigrants: Stories (Blair)
- Louise DeSalvo The House of Early Sorrows: A Memoir in Essays (Fordham University Press)
- Heid E. Erdrich New Poets of Native Nations (Graywolf Press)
- Ángel García Teeth Never Sleep: Poems (University of Arkansas Press)
- Tommy Orange There There (Knopf)
- Halifu Osumare Dancing in Blackness: A Memoir (University Press of Florida)
- Christopher Patton Unlikeness Is Us: Fourteen from the Exeter Book (Gaspereau Press)
- Mark Sarvas Memento Park: A Novel (Farrar, Straus and Giroux)
- Jeffrey C. Stewart The New Negro: The Life of Alain Locke (Oxford University Press)
- William T. Vollmann Carbon Ideologies: Volume I, No Immediate Danger, Volume II, No Good Alternative (Viking Press|Viking)
- G. Willow Wilson and Nico Leon Ms. Marvel Vol. 9: Teenage Wasteland (Marvel Comics)
- Nathan Hare Lifetime Achievement Award
- UCLA Chicano Studies Research Center Editor/Publisher Award
- Moor Mother Oral Literature Award

=== 2020s ===
==== 2020 ====
Author(s)	Title	Publisher
Reginald Dwayne Betts	Felon: Poems	W.W. Norton
Sara Borjas	Heart Like a Window, Mouth Like a Cliff	Noemi Press
Neeli Cherkovski, Raymond Foye, Tate Swindell (editors)	Collected Poems of Bob Kaufman	City Lights
Staceyann Chin	Crossfire: A Litany for Survival	Haymarket
Kali Fajardo-Anstine	Sabrina & Corina: Stories	One World
Tara Fickle	The Race Card: From Gaming Technologies to Model Minorities	New York University Press
Erika Lee	America for Americans: A History of Xenophobia in the United States	Basic Books
Yoko Ogawa	The Memory Police	Pantheon
Jake Skeets	Eyes Bottle Dark with a Mouthful of Flowers	Milkweed Editions
George Takei, Justin Eisinger, Steven Scott, and Harmony Becker	They Called Us Enemy	Top Shelf Productions
Ocean Vuong	On Earth We're Briefly Gorgeous	Penguin
De'Shawn Charles Winslow	In West Mills	Bloomsbury Publishing
Albert Woodfox with Leslie George	Solitary: My Story of Transformation and Hope	Grove Press
Eleanor W. Traylor	Lifetime Achievement Award	
Kofi Natambu	Editor Award: The Panopticon Review	
Jasper Bernes, Joshua Clover, and Juliana Spahr	Publisher Award: Commune Editions	
Amalia Leticia Ortiz	Oral Literature Award	
Anthony Harkins and Meredith McCarroll (editors)	Walter & Lillian Lowenfels Criticism Award: Appalachian Reckoning: A Region Responds to Hillbilly Elegy	

==== 2021 ====
Author(s)	Title	Publisher
Ayad Akhtar	Homeland Elegies	Little, Brown & Co.
Maisy Card	These Ghosts Are Family	Simon & Schuster
Anthony Cody	Borderland Apocrypha	Omnidawn Press
Ben Ehrenreich	Desert Notebooks: A Road Map for the End of Time	Counterpoint
Johanna Fernández	The Young Lords: A Radical History	University of North Carolina Press
Carolyn Forché	In the Lateness of the World: Poems	Penguin Press
John Giorno	Great Demon Kings: A Memoir of Poetry, Sex, Art, Death, and Enlightenment	Farrar, Straus and Giroux
Cathy Park Hong	Minor Feelings: An Asian American Reckoning	One World
Randall Horton	{#289-128}: Poems	University of Kentucky
Gerald Horne	The Dawning of the Apocalypse: The Roots of Slavery, White Supremacy, Settler Colonialism, and Capitalism in the Long Sixteenth Century	Monthly Review Press
Robert P. Jones	White Too Long: The Legacy of White Supremacy in American Christianity	Simon & Schuster
Judy Juanita	Manhattan my ass, you're in Oakland	Equidistance Press
William Melvin Kelley (author), Aiki Kelley (illustrator)	Dunfords Travels Everywheres	Anchor Books
Maryemma Graham	Lifetime Achievement Award	
Shana Redmond	Walter & Lillian Lowenfels Criticism Award: Everything Man: The Form and Function of Paul Robeson	
Jacob Soboroff	Anti-Censorship Award: Separated: Inside an American Tragedy	

==== 2022 ====
Author(s)	Title	Publisher
Spencer Ackerman	Reign of Terror: How the 9/11 Era Destabilized America and Produced Trump	Viking
Esther G. Belin, Jeff Burgland, Connie A. Jacobs, Anthony K. Webster	The Diné Reader: An Anthology of Navajo Literature	University of Arizona Press
Emma Brodie	Songs in Ursa Major	Knopf
Daphne Brooks	Liner Notes for the Revolution: The Intellectual Life of Black Feminist Sound	Harvard University Press
Myriam J. A. Chancy	What Storm, What Thunder	Tin House Books
Francisco Goldman	Monkey Boy	Grove Press
Zakiya Dalila Harris	The Other Black Girl: A Novel	Atria Books
Fatima Shaik	Economy Hall: The Hidden History of a Free Black Brotherhood	The Historic New Orleans Collection
Edwin Torres	Quanundrum: [i will be your many angled thing]	Roof Books
Truong Tran	Book of the Other: Small in Comparison	Kaya Press
Mai Der Vang	Yellow Rain	Graywolf Press
Phillip B. Williams	Mutiny	Penguin Books
Michelle Zauner	Crying in H Mart: A Memoir	Knopf
Gayl Jones	Lifetime Achievement Award	
Jessica E. Teague	Walter & Lillian Lowenfels Criticism Award: Sound Recording Technology and American Literature	
Jeffrey St. Clair	Anti-Censorship Award	
Wave Books: Charlie Wright (Publisher) / Joshua Beckman (Editor in Chief)	Editor/Publisher Award	

==== 2023 ====
Author(s)	Title	Publisher
Ayanna Lloyd Banwo	When We Were Birds	Doubleday
Edgar Gomez	High-Risk Homosexual	Soft Skull
Kelly Lytle Hernández	Bad Mexicans: Race, Empire, and Revolution in the Borderlands	W.W. Norton & Company
Everett Hoagland	The Ways: Poems of Affirmation, Reflection and Wonder	North Star Nova Press
Anne Hyde	Born of Lakes and Plains: Mixed-Descent Peoples and the Making of the American West	W.W. Norton & Company
Jamil Jan Kochai	The Haunting of Haji Hotak and Other Stories	Viking
Aidan Levy	Saxophone Colossus: The Life and Music of Sonny Rollins	Hachette Books
Bojan Louis	Sinking Bell: Stories	Gray Wolf Press
Leila Mottley	Nightcrawling	Knopf
Darryl Pinckney	Come Back in September: A Literary Education on West Sixty-seventh Street, Manhattan	Farrar, Straus and Giroux
Sherry Shenoda	Mummy Eaters	University of Nebraska Press
Mosab Abu Toha	Things You May Find Hidden in My Ear: Poems from Gaza	City Lights Books
Javier Zamora	Solito: A Memoir	Hogarth
Maxine Hong Kingston	Lifetime Achievement Award	
Neta Crawford	Anti-Censorship Award	
Bell hooks	Walter & Lilliam Lowenfels Award for Criticism	

==== 2024 ====
Author(s)	Title	Publisher
Chitra Banerjee Divakaruni	Independence: A Novel	William Morrow
Debra Magpie Earling	The Lost Journals of Sacajawea: A Novel	Milkweed Editions
Paul S. Flores	We Still Be: Poems and Performances	El Martillo Press
Aisha Abdel Gawad	Between Two Moons: A Novel	Doubleday
Gregg Hecimovich	The Life and Times of Hannah Crafts: The True Story of The Bondwoman's Narrative	Ecco
C. L. R. James, Nic Watts (adapted), Sakina Karimjee (illustrator)	Toussaint Louverture: The Story of the Only Successful Slave Revolt in History	Verso
R. F. Kuang	Yellowface	William Morrow
Felipe Luciano	Flesh & Spirit: Confessions of a Young Lord	Empire State Editions
Fae Myenne Ng	Orphan Bachelors	Grove Press
Roger Reeves	Dark Days: Fugitive Essays	Graywolf
John N. Roberts	Changing the Commons: Stories About Place Making	ORO Editions
Barbara D. Savage	Merze Tate: The Global Odyssey of a Black Woman Scholar	Yale University Press
Rachel L. Swarns	The 272: The Families Who were Enslaved and Sold to Build the American Catholic Church	Random House
Henry Threadgill, Brent Hayes Edwards	Easily Slip into Another World: A Life in Music	Knopf
Valerie Wilson Wesley	A Shimmer of Red (An Odessa Jones Mystery)	Kensington
Rosanna Xia	California Against the Sea: Visions for Our Vanishing Coastline	Heyday
John Yau	Please Wait by the Coatroom: Reconsidering Race and Identity in American Art	Black Sparrow Press
Monica Youn	From From	Graywolf
Jessica Hagedorn	Lifetime Achievement Award	
Jeff Deutsch (publisher) / Parneshia Jones (editor)	Editor/Publisher Award	
Rabbi Michael Lerner	Tikkun Magazine	
Jeffrey D. Sachs	Anti-Censorship Award	
Asna Tabassum	Anti-Censorship Award	
Lynnée Denise	Walter & Lilliam Lowenfels Award for Criticism: Why Willie Mae Thornton Matters	University of Texas Press
Brenda M. Greene	Walter & Lilliam Lowenfels Award for Criticism: "Book Review: Erasure by Percival Everett, The Basis for the Film American Fiction"	Our Time Press
Mehdi Hasan	Walter & Lilliam Lowenfels Award for Criticism: Zeteo	
Kate Wagner	Walter & Lilliam Lowenfels Award for Criticism: "Behind F1's Velvet Curtain"	Escape Collection

==== 2025 ====
Author(s)	Title	Publisher
Kaveh Akbar	Martyr!: A Novel	Knopf
Amy M. Alvarez	Makeshift Altar: Poems	University Press of Kentucky
Marie-Helene Bertino	Beautyland: A Novel	Farrar, Straus and Giroux
Marcela Fuentes	Malas: A Novel	Penguin Books
Percival Everett	James: A Novel	Penguin Books
Fady Joudah	[...] Poems	Milkweed Editions
Stacey Levine	Mice 1961	Verse Chorus Press
Sarah Lewis	The Unseen Truth: When Race Changed Sight in America	Harvard University Press
Tomiko Matsumoto, Ryokuyo Matsumoto, and Nancy Matsumoto, editor	By the Shore of Lake Michigan	UCLA Asian American Studies Center
Sharon McMahon	The Small and the Mighty: Twelve Unsung Americans Who Changed the Course of History, from the Founding to the Civil Rights Movement	Thesis
Claire Messud	This Strange Eventful History: A Novel	W.W. Norton
Maceo Montoya, Javier O. Huerta	Imaginative Possibilities: Conversations with Twenty-First Century Latinx Writers	University of Pittsburgh Press
m.s. RedCherries	mother	Penguin Press
Danzy Senna	Colored Television: A Novel	Riverhead
A.B. Spellman, Laurie Scheyer editor	Between the Night and Its Music: New and Selected Poems	Wesleyan University Press
John Edgar Wideman	Lifetime Achievement Award	
Erroll McDonald	Editor/Publisher Award: Vice President/Executive Director, Penguin Random House	
Joy Reid	Anti-Censorship Award	

==== 2026 ====
Author(s)	Title	Publisher
Nicholas Boggs	Baldwin: A Love Story	Farrar, Straus and Giroux
Stacie Shannon Denetsosie, Kinsale Drake, Darcie Little Badger	Beyond the Glittering World	Torrey House Press
Cedric De Leon	Freedom Train	University of California Press
Omar El Akkad	One Day, Everyone Will Have Always Been Against This	Knopf
John Fugelsang	Separation of Church and Hate	Simon & Schuster
Douglas Kearney	I Imagine I Been Science Fiction Always	Wave Books
Adela Najarro	Variations in Blue: Poems	Red Hen Press
Matthew Shipp	Black Mystery School Pianists and Other Writings	Autonomedia
Juliana Spahr	Ars Poeticas	Wesleyan University Press
Brandon M. Terry	Shattered Dreams, Infinite Hope	Harvard University Press
Beth Lew-Williams	John Doe Chinaman	Harvard University Press
Deborah Willis	Reflections in Black (25th Anniversary Edition)	Liveright
Mitch Kaplan, Books & Books, Miami and Stephen Colbert	Anti-Censorship Award	
Ron Scott, New York Amsterdam News and A.L. James, Ornette Coleman, Psychoanalysis, Discourse	Walter and Lilian Lowenfels Award for Criticism	
Morgan Entrekin, Grove/Atlantic and Roger Malina, Leonardo, The International Society for the Arts, Sciences, and Technology	Editor/Publisher Award	
Karen Tei Yamashita	Lifetime Achievement Award	
