= Cherry Muhanji =

American writer

Cherry Muhanji is the pen name of Jeannette Delaine Washington (born April 26, 1939, in Detroit, Michigan), an American writer.

She is best known for her novel Her, which won a Ferro-Grumley Award and a Lambda Literary Award in 1991, and the anthology Tight Spaces, which she copublished with Kesho Y. Scott and Egyirba High and which won an American Book Award in 1988. She has also published poetry and short stories in literary magazines and anthologies and is currently working on a memoir.

Muhanji holds a doctorate in English, anthropology and African American World Studies from the University of Iowa. She has taught at various colleges and universities, including the University of Minnesota, Goddard College and Portland State University.

Muhanji's only novel, Her, was released in 1990. It explores the relationships between a community of black women in Detroit.
