= Manuel Martinez =

Manuel Martínez may refer to:

- Manuel Martínez Gutiérrez (born 1974), Spanish track and field athlete
- Manuel Martínez Canales (1928–2014), Spanish footballer
- Manuel Martínez Iñiguez (born 1972), Mexican footballer
- Manuel Martínez Lara (born 1980), Spanish footballer
- Manuel Martínez (fencer) (born 1939), Spanish Olympic fencer
- Manuel Alonso Martínez (1827–1891), Spanish jurist and politician
- Manuel Luis Martinez (born 1966), American novelist and literary critic
- Manuel Martínez (politician), 1919-1922 Secretary of State of New Mexico

== See also ==
- Manny Martinez (disambiguation)
