= Phil Henderson =

Phil Henderson may refer to:

- Phil Henderson (writer) (born 1968), American novelist, illustrator, essayist, and poet
- Phil Henderson (basketball) (1968–2013), American basketball player
