= Daryl Dixon (disambiguation) =

Daryl Dixon is a character from the American television series The Walking Dead.

Daryl or Darryl or Darrell Dixon may also refer to:

- Daryl Dixon (economic writer) (born 1942), investment and economic writer and consultant
- Daryl Dixon, musician on the album Quazar
- Darryl Dixon (musician), see List of P-Funk members
- Darrell Dixon (racing driver), in 2012 Australian GT Championship season

== See also ==
- Darryl Dickson-Carr (born 1968), American editor and critic
