= Mogil =

Mogil is a surname. People with the surname include:

- Christopher Mogil (fl. 1990s), American philanthropist
- Jeffrey Mogil (born 1966), Canadian neuroscientist

== See also ==
- Mogil Mogil, a place in New South Wales, Australia, near Moonie River, and on Gwydir Highway and Kamilaroi Highway
- Moggill, Queensland, a suburb in the City of Brisbane, Queensland, Australia
- Mogul (disambiguation)
