= Cecelie Berry =

American writer

Cecelie S. Berry
- Occupation: writer

Cecelie S. Berry is an American writer.

== Biography ==
She is a graduate of Harvard College and Harvard Law School. Her work has appeared in The New York Times, The Washington Post, Newsweek, Salon, Child, and O, The Oprah Magazine.

She is the niece of American classical composer Julia Perry (25 March 1924 – 12 October 1979).

She married Scott Flood in September 1988.

== Awards ==
- 2005 American Book Award

== Works ==
- "Home is Where the Revolution Is". Salon. September 29, 1999. Archived from the original on October 24, 2012.
- "United Nations of Nannies". Salon. February 11, 2000. Archived from the original on October 24, 2012.
- Rise Up Singing: Black Women Writers on Motherhood. Random House, Inc. 2005. ISBN 978-0-7679-1468-0.

=== Anthologies ===
- Camille Peri; Kate Moses, eds. (2005). "Was He Black or White?". Because I said so: 33 mothers write about children, sex, men, aging, faith, race, & themselves. HarperCollins. ISBN 978-0-06-059878-5.
