= Yuko Taniguchi =

American poet

- Born: Yokohama, Japan
- Education: College of Saint Benedict and Saint John's University; University of Minnesota (MFA)
- Occupations: Poet; novelist

Yuko Taniguchi (born in Yokohama, Japan) is a Japanese American poet and novelist.

== Life ==
She graduated from the College of Saint Benedict and Saint John's University and from the University of Minnesota with a Master of Fine Arts degree.

She teaches at the University of Minnesota.

== Awards ==
- 2008 American Book Award (The Before Columbus Foundation)
- Finalist, The Dayton Literary Peace Prize
- Finalist, 11th Annual Asian American Literary Awards
- 2008 Kiriyama Prize Notable Book
- 15th Annual Skipping Stones Honor Awards
- Finalist, Literary Fiction category for ForeWord Magazine's Book of the Year Awards
- Honorable Mention, The 2007 Gustayus Myers Center Outstanding Book Awards Advancing Human Rights

== Works ==
=== Poetry ===
- Foreign Wife Elegy. Coffee House Press. 2004. ISBN 978-1-56689-148-6. "Yuko Taniguchi."

=== Novels ===
- The Ocean in the Closet. Coffee House Press. 2007. ISBN 978-1-56689-194-3.
