= Tino Villanueva =

American poet and writer (born 1941)

- Born: December 11, 1941 (age 84) San Marcos, Texas, U.S.
- Occupation: Poet; writer
- Education: Texas State University; University at Buffalo (MA); Boston University
- Notable awards: American Book Award (1994)

Tino Villanueva (born December 11, 1941) is an American poet and writer. His early work was associated with the Chicano literary renaissance of the 1960s and 1970s, and Villanueva is considered to be a primary figure in that literary movement. More recently, Villanueva's work has treated themes from Greek mythology.

== Life ==
Villanueva was born in San Marcos, Texas. In 1963, he was drafted into the United States Army, and spent two years in the Panama Canal Zone, where he became immersed in Hispanic literature, reading Rubén Darío and José Martí. He graduated from Texas State University, on the G.I. Bill, from the State University of New York at Buffalo with an M.A. in 1971, and from Boston University with a doctorate in Spanish in 1981. He has taught at Wellesley College, and held visiting appointments at the University of Texas-Austin, the College of William and Mary, and Bowdoin College. Until his retirement in 2015, Villanueva served as senior lecturer in Spanish, Department of Romance Studies in the College of Arts and Sciences at Boston University.

Villanueva writes in both English and Spanish, often switching between the two languages. He founded Imagine Publishers, Inc., and edited Imagine: International Chicano Poetry Journal.

His papers are held at Texas State University.

== Awards ==
- 1994 American Book Award, for Scenes from the Movie GIANT (1993).
- 1995 Distinguished Alumnus Award from Texas State University-San Marcos.
- 2015 Liberal Arts Distinguished Alumni Achievement Award, Texas State University-San Marcos.

== Works ==
- Hay Otra Voz Poems [There Is Another Voice Poems]. Editorial Mensaje. 1979 [1972]. ISBN 978-84-399-2826-3.
- Tino Villanueva, ed. (1980). Chicanos: Antología Histórica y Literaria. Fondo de Cultura Económica. ISBN 978-968-16-0521-6.
- Scenes from the Movie GIANT. Curbstone Press. 1993. ISBN 978-1-880684-12-2.
- James Hoggar (1994). Crónica de mis años peores. Northwestern University Press. ISBN 978-0-8101-5034-8.
- Shaking off the dark. Bilingual Press. 1998. ISBN 978-0-927534-73-4.
- Primera causa. Cross-Cultural Communications. 1999. ISBN 978-0-89304-177-9.
- Luis J. Rodriguez (1997). La llaman América. Translator Tino Villanueva. Curbstone Press. ISBN 978-1-880684-41-2.
- Tino Villanue (1988). Tres poetas de posguerra: Celaya, González y Caballero Bonaldva. Tamesis. ISBN 978-0-7293-0277-7.
- P. Mildonian, ed. (2002). Il canto del cronista. Antologia poetica. Le Lettere. ISBN 978-88-7166-633-4.
- So Spoke Penelope. Grolier Poetry Press. 2013. ISBN 978-1-891592-02-7.
