= Rachelle Cruz =

American writer

Rachelle Cruz is a Filipina American poet from Hayward, California. She won the 2016 Hillary Gravendyk Regional Poetry Prize and a 2018 American Book Award. Her poetry, fiction, and essays have been published in Strange Horizons, the San Francisco Chronicle, As/Us,, and MĀNOA: A Pacific Journal of International Writing. Cruz wrote about reimagining the creative writing workshop in Poets & Writers Magazine.

She teaches at University of California, Riverside. In 2019, she was Inlandia Literary Laureate.

== Works ==
- Experiencing Comics: An Introduction to Reading, Discussing, and Creating Comics (Cognella, 2020) ISBN 9781793514417
- God’s Will for Monsters (Inlandia, 2017) ISBN 9780997093247
- Self-Portrait as Rumor and Blood (Dancing Girl Press, 2012)
