= John Norton (author) =

American poet and fiction writer

- Born: July 4, 1936; Boston, Massachusetts, U.S.
- Died: August 9, 2015 (aged 79); San Francisco, California, U.S.
- Education: Boston College; University of Pennsylvania (MA, PhD)
- Occupations: Poet; writer
- Spouse: Anne Subercaseaux
- Writing career
- Genre: Fiction
- Notable awards: American Book Award (1990)

John Norton (July 4, 1936 – August 9, 2015) was an American poet and fiction writer who won the American Book Award in 1990 for The Light at the End of the Bog.

== Life ==
John Norton graduated from Boston College and the University of Pennsylvania with an M.A. and Ph.D. He taught at the University of California, Riverside. John moved to San Francisco in the 1970s and soon afterward joined Robert Gluck's Writing Workshop at Small Press Traffic. His poems and stories have appeared in America, New American Writing, CrossConnect, Kayak, Oxygen, Beatitude, Blue Unicorn, Onthebus, and Processed World. John served as board president of Small Press Traffic Literary Arts Center and the Irish Arts Foundation and he helped organize the Crossroads Irish American Festival.

John lived in San Francisco, and worked in Silicon Valley as a technical writer and editor.

== Awards ==
- American Book Award

== Works ==
- Air Transmigra (San Francisco: Ithuriel's Spear) August 2010. ISBN 978-0979339066
- Re:Marriage (San Francisco: Black Star Series) 2000. ISBN 9780960763054
- The Light at the End of the Bog, (San Francisco: Black Star Series) 1989, 1992 ISBN 978-0-685-61094-7
- Posthum(or)ous (San Francisco: e. g. press) 1985 (chapbook)

=== Anthologies ===
- Beatitude 1959-2009 Golden Anniversary Anthology, (America's Press, 2010) ISBN 978-0-615-29394-3
- The Before Columbus Poetry Anthology: Selections from the American Book Awards 1980-1990, (W.W. Norton & Company, 1991) ISBN 978-0-393-30833-4
