= Judith Roche =

American poet

- Born: September 9, 1941; Detroit
- Died: November 14, 2019 (aged 78); Seattle
- Occupation: Poet

Judith Roche (September 9, 1941 – November 14, 2019) was a poet and the author of three collections of poetry. They are Myrrh/My Life as a Screamer, Ghost and recently, Wisdom of the Body, which won a 2007 American Book Award. She was also co-editor of First Fish, First People: Salmon Tales of the North Pacific Rim, which also won an American Book Award, and edited a number of poetry anthologies. Roche worked in collaboration with visual artists on several public art projects which are installed in the Seattle area. Roche was Literary Arts Director Emeritus for One Reel, an arts producing company, and teaches poetry workshops. Her work has appeared in Exquisite Corpse, Pebble Review, Wandering Hermit, and several anthologies. She conducted poetry workshops for adults and youth in prisons and was a fellow of Black Earth Institute. She was the 2007 Distinguished Writer at Seattle University. Roche was a founding member of Red Sky Poetry Theatre.
