= Hisham Aidi =

Moroccan-American political scientist and author

- ⵀⵉⵛⴰⵎ ⵄⴰⵢⴷⵉ هشام العايدي
- Education: Franklin & Marshall College (BA); Columbia University (PhD)

Hisham Aidi is a Moroccan-American political scientist, author, music critic, filmmaker, and senior lecturer in international relations at the School of International and Public Affairs at Columbia University. His research interests include comparative race politics, art and social movements, and the political economy of development.

His book Rebel Music: Race, Empire, and the New Muslim Youth Culture on global hip hop was a 2015 winner of the American Book Award.

== Biography ==
Aidi was born in Tangier and grew up in its old city. His formative years also included time in Spain, where his father worked. As a teenager, he would frequent Tangier's Dar Gnawa, or the House of Gnawa, where he might see guests such as the saxophonist Archie Shepp or the jazz poet Ted Joans.

When he was 15, he earned a scholarship to study at a boarding school in New Mexico in the United States. He then attended Franklin & Marshall College outside of Philadelphia, Pennsylvania in the early 1990s, studying political theory and economics. He also worked in college radio, where he played raï music and recordings by Abdessadiq Cheqara and Samy Elmaghribi. He wrote an undergraduate thesis entitled "Is Paul Bowles an Orientalist?" about the American writer in Tangier, and gave literary walking tours of Tangier over the summer.

In 1993, he began his doctoral studies at Columbia University, where he studied under and interacted with scholars such as Manning Marable, Robin Kelley, Mahmoud Mamdani, Edward Said, and Lisa Anderson. While studying at Columbia, Aidi lived in Harlem and worked in journalism and political analysis. After completing his PhD in 2002, he worked at the United Nations. He then lectured at University of Maryland.

== Publications ==
=== Author ===
- Aidi, Hisham (2014). Rebel music: race, empire, and the new Muslim youth culture. Islamic studies music. New York: Vintage Books, a division of Random House LLC. ISBN 978-0-307-27997-2.
- Aidi, Hisham (2009). Redeploying the state: corporatism, neoliberalism, and coalition politics. New York: Palgrave Macmillan. ISBN 978-0-230-61159-7. OCLC 226357085.

=== Editor ===
- Marable, Manning; Aidi, Hisham, eds. (2009). Black routes to Islam. New York, N.Y: Palgrave Macmillan. ISBN 978-1-4039-7781-6.
