= Anna Linzer =

American novelist

Anna O. Linzer is an American novelist, and non-profit management consultant.

== Life ==
Anna Linzer lived on the Suquamish Indian Reservation in Indianola, Washington.

Anna lives in Indianola with her husband Richard, and leads retreats and sessions on nonprofit financial management.

== Awards ==
- 1999 American Book Award
- 2001 Terry MacAdam Award

== Works ==
- Ghost Dancing. Macmillan. 1999. ISBN 978-0-312-20410-5.
- The Cash Flow Solution: The Nonprofit Board Member's Guide to Financial Success. John Wiley and Sons. 2006. ISBN 978-0-7879-7833-4.
- A RIVER STORY 2010. ISBN 978-1-935662-22-8
