= Julie Chibbaro =

American novelist

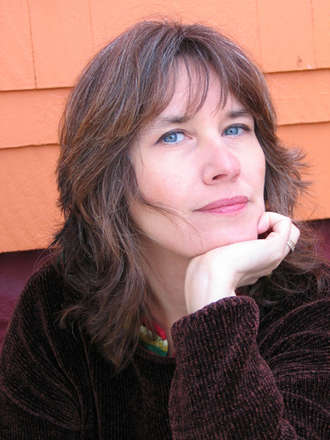
- Born: New York City, U.S.
- Occupation: Author
- Years active: 2004–present
- Spouse: JM Superville Sovak
- Website: https://www.juliechibbaro.com/

Julie Chibbaro is an American historical novelist.

== Background ==
Chibbaro has written for The Prague Post, The Montreal Gazette, The Poughkeepsie Journal, Hudson Valley Magazine, NY States of Mind, Books of Canada, Sundance TV, and Tuttle Publishing. She works as a staff editor at The Hastings Center.

Chibbaro studied writing at The New School with Gordon Lish. She received scholarships to study with Clark Blaise at the Prague Writers Workshop, and with Janet Fitch and Amy Tan at the Squaw Valley Community of Writers. At the New York Writers Institute, she took a Master class with Marilynne Robinson and Ann Beattie.

== Awards ==
- 2011 National Jewish Book Award for Deadly: How Do You Catch an Invisible Killer
- 2012 Top 10 ALA's Amelia Bloomer List
- 2012 Outstanding Science Trade Book for Deadly: How Do You Catch an Invisible Killer by National Science Teachers Association
- 2005 American Book Award for Redemption

== Works ==
Chibbaro's books include Into the Dangerous World (2015), a novel about a girl artist on the NY streets in 1984, Deadly (2011) a medical mystery about the hunt for Typhoid Mary in 1906, and Redemption (2004) a historical novel about a girl's unintended trip to the New World in 1524. Into the Dangerous World and Deadly are both illustrated by her husband, JM Superville Sovak.

Into the Dangerous World is a Junior Library Guild Selection. Deadly won the 2011 National Jewish Book Award, and was Top 10 on the American Library Association's Amelia Bloomer Project list. It was named a Bank Street Best Book, and an Outstanding Science Trade Book by the National Science Teachers Association . Redemption won the 2005 American Book Award.

- Redemption. Simon & Schuster/Atheneum. 2004. ISBN 978-0-689-85736-2.
- Deadly. Simon & Schuster/Atheneum. 2011. ISBN 978-0-689-85738-6.
- The Return of the Kral Majales. Literaria Pragensoa Books. 2010. ISBN 978-80-7308-302-1.
- Into the Dangerous World. Viking. 2015. ISBN 978-0-8037-3910-9.
