= Marnie Mueller =

American novelist

Marnie Mueller (born Tule Lake War Relocation Center) is an American novelist.

== Life ==
In 1963 she joined the Peace Corps, serving two years in Guayaquil, Ecuador. She worked for WBAI as Programming Director, but resigned in 1977, over staff cuts. She lives in New York City, with her husband Fritz Mueller.

== Awards ==
- Maria Thomas Award for Outstanding Fiction, for Green Fires
- 1995 American Book Award, for Green Fires

== Works ==
- Green fires: assault on Eden : a novel of the Ecuadorian rainforest. Curbstone Press. 1994. ISBN 978-1-880684-16-0.
- The Climate of the Country. Curbstone Press. 1999. ISBN 978-1-880684-58-0.
- My Mother's Island. Curbstone Press. 2002. ISBN 978-1-880684-82-5.

=== Anthologies ===
- John Coyne, ed. (1999). Living on the edge: fiction by Peace Corps writers. Curbstone Press. ISBN 978-1-880684-57-3.
- Erica Harth, ed. (2003). "A Daughter's Need to Know". Last witnesses: reflections on the wartime internment of Japanese Americans. Palgrave Macmillan. ISBN 978-1-4039-6230-0.

=== Criticism ===
- "Review: Selected Accidents, Pointless Anecdotes", Peace Corps Writers
