= Shann Ray =

American writer

Shann Ray (born in Billings, Montana, on October 3, 1967) is a Czech-American poet, novelist, social scientist, and American Book Award winner. He teaches leadership and forgiveness studies at Gonzaga University and poetry at Stanford. A National Endowment for the Arts Fellow and group Fulbright recipient to South Africa, through his research in forgiveness and genocide Shann has served as a visiting scholar in Africa, Asia, Europe, and the Americas, and as a poetry mentor for the PEN America Prison and Justice Writers Program. He has delivered poetry engagements at Cambridge and the Center for Contemplative Leadership at Princeton Theological Seminary, and values mutual work involving art, leadership, and the reconciliation of people and nations. Having collaborated as a visiting poet with painter Makoto Fujimura on a United Nations grant entitled Intercultural Dialogues through Beauty as a Language of Peace, Ray is also an International Book Award winner, a three-time High Plains International Book Award winner, Bread Loaf Fellow, Bakeless Prize winner, Western Writers of America Spur Award winner, and winner of the Foreword Book of the Year Readers’ Choice Award. His work comprises a libretto and 17 books, of which 12 are poetry, fiction, and creative nonfiction including Where Blackbirds Fly, Atomic Theory 7, The Garment of Praise, Forgiveness and Power in the Age of Atrocity, Balefire, American Masculine, Sweetclover, Blood Fire Vapor Smoke, American Copper, The Souls of Others, and Transparent in the Backlight. His poems and prose have been featured in Poetry, Esquire, Narrative, Mudlark, McSweeney’s, Prairie Schooner, Poetry International, Big Sky Journal, Montana Quarterly, and the American Journal of Poetry.

Shann Ray writes poetry and literary fiction under the name Shann Ray in honor of his mother Saundra Rae, and social science as Shann Ray Ferch. He is the author of the novel Where Blackbirds Fly, (Bison Books, 2025), Transparent in the Backlight (2022), American Copper (Unbridled Books, 2015), American Masculine: Stories (Graywolf Press, 2011), Forgiveness and Power in the Age of Atrocity (Rowman & Littlefield, 2011), Blood Fire Vapor Smoke: Stories (Unsolicited Press, 2019), Sweetclover: Poems (Lost Horse Press, 2019), Atomic Theory 7: Poems (Resource Publications, 2020) and Balefire: Poems (Lost Horse Press, 2014). He is also the editor with Larry C. Spears of Conversations on Servant Leadership: Insights on Human Courage in Life and Work (SUNY Press) and The Spirit of Servant Leadership (Paulist Press), and the editor with Jiying Song of Servant Leadership and Forgiveness: How Leaders Help Heal the Heart of the World (SUNY Press). His work has appeared worldwide in leading literary venues and scientific journals, including Poetry (magazine), McSweeney's, Poetry International, Narrative Magazine, the Journal of Counseling and Development, the Journal of Leadership and Organizational Studies, and the Voices of Servant Leadership Series.

His awards include a National Endowment for the Arts Literature Fellowship, the American Book Award, three High Plains International Book Awards, the International Book Award, the Foreword Book of the Year Readers Choice Award, and the Bakeless Prize, formerly given annually in fiction, poetry, and nonfiction a Fellowship of the Bread Loaf Writers' Conference, the Subterrain Poetry Prize, the Crab Creek Review Fiction Prize, the Pacific Northwest Inlander Short Fiction Award, the Poetry Quarterly Poetry Prize, and the Ruminate Short Story Prize. His poems and stories have been selected for the Best New Poets and the Best of McSweeney's anthologies.

Among other literary journals in America, Ray's poems and stories have appeared in Prairie Schooner, Northwest Review, the William and Mary Review, Borderlands, the South Dakota Review, and StoryQuarterly.

Ray's work in leadership and forgiveness studies has garnered critical acclaim. He has served as a panelist for the National Endowment for the Humanities, as a research psychologist for the Centers for Disease Control, and as a visiting scholar in the Netherlands, Colombia, Canada, the Philippines, and South Africa. He is the editor of The International Journal of Servant Leadership, and currently teaches leadership and forgiveness studies in the doctoral program in Leadership Studies at Gonzaga University. He resides in Spokane, Washington.
