= John C. Walter =

American historian (1933–2023)

- Born: May 5, 1933; Jacks River, Jamaica
- Died: March 21, 2023 (aged 89); Atlanta, Georgia, U.S.
- Occupation: Professor Emeritus

Academic background
- Education: University of Maine

Academic work
- Discipline: History, Women's Studies
- Institutions: Bowdoin College, Smith College, University of Washington

John Christopher Walter (May 5, 1933 – March 21, 2023) was an American historian, and professor at University of Washington.

He graduated from University of Maine, with a Ph.D., in 1972.

Walter died on March 21, 2023, at the age of 89.

== Awards ==
- 1990 American Book Award

== Works ==
- "The Changing Status of the Black Athlete in the 20th Century United States", American Studies online, 1996, City of Liverpool College
- The Harlem Fox: J. Raymond Jones and Tammany, 1920-1970. SUNY Press. 1989. ISBN 978-0-88706-756-3.
- Johnnella E. Butler; John Christopher Walter, eds. (1991). Transforming the curriculum: ethnic studies and women's studies. SUNY Press. ISBN 978-0-7914-0586-4.
- Black Athletes and the Color Line: In Their Own Words, with Malina Iida
