= Kathryn Waddell Takara =

American poet (born 1943)

Kathryn "Kay" Waddell Takara (née Waddell; born 1943) is an American poet. She won a 2010 American Book Award for Pacific Raven: Hawai`i Poems.

== Professional background ==
Takara graduated from Tufts University with a Bachelor's degree in 1965, from the University of California, Berkeley, with a Master's degree in 1969, and from University of Hawaiʻi with a PhD in 1995. She taught at the Interdisciplinary Studies Program at the University of Hawaiʻi at Mānoa.

== Published works ==
- New and Collected Poems, Ishmael Reed Publishing Company, 2003. ISBN 978-0-918408-35-8
- Pacific Raven: Hawaii Poems, Pacific Raven Press, 2009. ISBN 978-0-9841228-0-6
- Tourmalines: Beyond the Ebony Portal, Pacific Raven Press, 2010. ISBN 978-0-9841228-2-0
