= Mark Sarvas =

American novelist

- Born: New York, NY
- Education: NYU, MFA: Bennington College
- Occupations: Novelist; reviewer; blogger

Mark Sarvas (born September 26, 1964) is an American novelist, critic, and blogger living in Los Angeles. He was the host of the literary blog The Elegant Variation and author of the novel Harry, Revised (2008). Harry, Revised was published by Bloomsbury, and was a finalist for the Fiction Prize of the Southern California Independent Booksellers Association. It was also a 2008 Denver Post Good Reads selection.

Sarvas is a member of the National Book Critics Circle and PEN America, and a contributing editor of the Los Angeles Review of Books.

His second novel, Memento Park, was acquired by Farrar, Straus and Giroux in May 2014, and published in March 2018. His third novel, @UGMAN, was published in 2025.

== Awards ==
- 2005: The Guardian Top 10 Litblog
- 2005: Los Angeles magazine Top LA Blog
- 2006: Forbes Best of the Web
- 2008: Southern California Independent Booksellers Association: First Fiction Prize finalist
- 2018: Santa Monica Arts Fellowship
- 2019: AJL Fiction Award
- 2019: American Book Award for Memento Park
- 2019: Finalist, Sami Rohr Prize
- 2019: Shortlisted, JQ Wingate Literary Prize.

== Bibliography ==
- Harry, Revised (2008)
- Memento Park (2018)
- @UGMAN (2025)
