= Jeffrey F. L. Partridge =

American writer and essayist

Jeffrey F. L. Partridge is an American writer and essayist, winner of the 2007 American Book Award for Beyond Literary Chinatown.

== Works ==
- "Aiiieeeee! and the Asian American Literary Movement: A Conversation with Shawn Wong.", MELUS, Vol. 29, 2004
- Beyond literary Chinatown. University of Washington Press. 2007. ISBN 978-0-295-98706-4. "Jeffrey F. L. Partridge."

=== Anthologies ===
- Robbie B. H. Goh; Shawn Wong, eds. (2004). "Claiming Diaspora in Shirley Geok-lin Lim's Joss & Gold". Asian diasporas: cultures, identities, representations. Hong Kong University Press. ISBN 978-962-209-673-8.
- David S. Goldstein; Audrey B. Thacker, eds. (2008). "Hybridity in Gish Jen's Mona in the Promised Land". Complicating Constructions: Race, Ethnicity, and Hybridity in American Texts. University of Washington Press. ISBN 978-0-295-98835-1.
