= Stella Pope Duarte =

American writer

- Born: South Phoenix, Arizona
- Occupation: Novelist
- Education: Arizona State University (BA, MA)
- Notable awards: American Book Awards; 2009 If I Die in Juarez

Stella Pope Duarte is a Latina American novelist.

== Life ==
She graduated from Arizona State University with a B.A. and MA in Educational Counseling. She taught at Arizona State University from 1999–2008, and South Mountain Community College. She was a member of the Arizona Commission on the Arts from 2006 to 2010.

== Awards ==
- 2009 American Book Award, for If I Die in Juarez
- 2004 Barbara Deming Memorial Fund Award
- 2001 Arizona Commission on the Arts Creative Writing Fellowship, for Let Their Spirits Dance
- 1997 Arizona Commission on the Arts Creative Writing Fellowship, for Fragile Night

== Works ==
- Fragile Night. Bilingual Review Press. 1997. ISBN 978-0-927534-71-0.
- Let Their Spirits Dance. HarperCollins. 2003. ISBN 978-0-06-008948-1.
- If I Die in Juárez. University of Arizona Press. 2008. ISBN 978-0-8165-2492-1.
- Women Who Live in Coffee Shops and Other Stories. Arte Publico Press. 2010. ISBN 978-1-55885-600-4.

=== Anthology ===
- Eugenia Zukerman, ed. (2003). "Rosanna Pope". In My Mother's Closet. Notre Dame, IN: Sorin Books. ISBN 978-1-893732-47-6.
