= Graciela Limón =

American novelist (1938–2024)

- Born: August 2, 1938; East Los Angeles, California, U.S.
- Died: April 3, 2024 (aged 85)
- Occupation: Novelist
- Education: Marymount College; Universidad de las Américas Puebla; University of California, Los Angeles (PhD)
- Notable awards: American Book Award (1994); Gustavus Myers Outstanding Book Award (2002)

Graciela Limón (August 2, 1938 – April 3, 2024) was an American novelist and university professor. She was honored with an American Book Award and the Luis Leal Award for Distinction in Chicano/Latino Literature.

Limón wrote critical work on Mexican, Latin American and Caribbean literature. She later concentrated her writing efforts on creative fiction that is germane to her areas of interest: feminism, social justice and cultural identity.

Her body of work includes In Search of Bernabé, which won The Before Columbus Foundation American Book Award (1994). Limón also published The Memories of Ana Calderón (1994), ''Song of the Hummingbird'' (1996) and The Day of the Moon (1999). Erased Faces, which was awarded the 2002 Gustavus Myers Book Award, was published in 2001; Left Alive was released in 2005; The River Flows North in 2009, and The Madness of Mamá Carlota in 2012. Her last book was The Intriguing Life of Ximena Godoy, published by Cafe con Leche Books.

== Life ==
Graciela Limón was born in East Los Angeles where her parents settled after immigration from Mexico. From an early age, she dreamed of becoming a novelist. She graduated from Bishop Conaty Memorial High School, Marymount College (now Loyola Marymount University), Fundación Universidad de las Américas, Puebla with a master's degree, and from University of California Los Angeles with a PhD in Spanish American Literature.

She was a professor emeritus of Loyola Marymount University, where she taught U.S. and Hispanic literature and also served as chair of the Department of Chicano and Chicana Studies. She attempted to publish a collection of her essays, but every editor she went to rejected them. This caused her to spend some time in depression.

She was a professor at the University of California, Santa Barbara and University of California, Los Angeles. She taught courses in Latina/Chicana narratives, border narratives, and contemporary Latin American literature.

Limón was an activist in Chicano work as well as in the areas of gender and women's affairs. Limón published nine novels, all of which deal with a Latina and trans-border experience.

Limón died after a brief illness on April 3, 2024, at the age of 85.

== Awards ==
- 1994, The Before Columbus Foundation American Book Award
- 2002, Gustavus Myers Outstanding Book Award
- 2009, Luis Leal Award for Distinction in Chicano/Latino Literature

== Works ==
- María de Belén: the autobiography of an Indian woman : a novel. Vantage Press. 1990. ISBN 978-0-533-08381-7.
- In Search of Bernabé. Arte Público Press. 1993. ISBN 978-1-55885-073-6. "Graciela Limon."
- Song of the Hummingbird. Arte Público Press. 1996. ISBN 978-1-55885-091-0.
- The Day of the Moon. Arte Publico Press. 1999. ISBN 978-1-55885-274-7.
- Erased Faces: A Novel. Arte Publico Press. 2001. ISBN 978-1-55885-342-3. "Graciela Limon."
- The Memories of Ana Calderón. Arte Público Press. 2004. ISBN 978-1-55885-355-3.
- Left Alive. Arte Público Press. 2005. ISBN 978-1-55885-460-4.
- The River Flows North. Arte Publico Press. 2009. ISBN 978-1-55885-585-4.
- El día de la luna. Translated by Angie Nevárez. Arte Publico Press. 2004. ISBN 978-1-55885-435-2. "Graciela Limon."
- La canción del colibrí. Arte Publico Press. 2006. ISBN 978-1-55885-449-9.
- Limón, Graciela (2012). The Madness of Mamá Carlota. Houston. ISBN 978-1-55885-742-1.
- Los recuerdos de Ana Calderón. Translated by Nuria Brufau Alvira. Arte Público Press. 2013. ISBN 978-1-55885-707-0.
- En busca de Bernabé. Translated by Miguel Aparicio. Arte Público Press. 1997. ISBN 978-1-55885-195-5.
- The Intriguing Life of Ximena Godoy. Savvy Literary Services/ Cafe con Leche Books. 2015.

=== Anthologies ===
- Nicolás Kanellos, ed. (2003). Herencia: The Anthology of Hispanic Literature of the United States. Oxford University Press. ISBN 978-0-19-513825-2.
- Rick Heide, ed. (2002). "In Search of Bernabé". Under the fifth sun: Latino literature from California. Heyday Books. ISBN 978-1-890771-59-1.
- Lillian Castillo-Speed, ed. (1995). Latina: women's voices from the borderlands. Simon & Schuster. ISBN 978-0-684-80381-4.
