= Manny Martinez =

Manny Martinez may refer to:

- Manny Martínez (musician), drummer, formerly for The Misfits
- Manny Martínez (baseball) (born 1970), former Major League Baseball outfielder

== See also ==
- Manuel Martinez (disambiguation)
