= Natasha Borovsky =

American poet

- Born: August 5, 1924 Paris, France
- Died: May 31, 2012 (aged 87)
- Parents: Alexander Borovsky and Maria Sila-Nowicki

Natasha Borovsky (Russian: Наталья Александровна Боровская)(August 5, 1924 – May 31, 2012) was a Russian American poet and novelist. She is the author of two celebrated works of historical fiction spanning the first half of the 20th century. Borovsky writes about the shattering effect of war on families and the decline of the European aristocracy. Her first novel, A Daughter of the Nobility, was translated into ten languages, including Russian and Polish. Her second, Lost Heritage, is a sequel with new characters, completing a drama that began during the Russian Revolution and ends at the time of the Yalta Conference.

== Life ==
Borovsky was born in Paris to her father, the renowned Russian pianist, Alexander Borovsky, and her mother, Maria Sila-Nowicki, who was of noble Polish and Russian descent. She spent winters and summers at her mother's family estate near Kazimierz Dolny, south of Warsaw. She went to school in Germany, Switzerland and France. Forced to leave France at the outset of World War II, she came with her mother to the United States where she spent two years at Sarah Lawrence College and where her extraordinary language skills landed her a job translating wartime broadcasts from around the world for CBS News.

She worked at the Office of War Information in New York City, and at the Hoover Institute, University of California, Berkeley's library and research facilities in Paris.

Borovsky married Stuart Dodds, an editor/general manager of the syndication division of the San Francisco Chronicle; they lived together in Berkeley, California.

== Awards ==
- 1986 American Book Award for A Daughter of the Nobility

== Works ==
=== Poetry ===
- Under the rainbow: and related poems
- Drops of glass: poems, in major and minor, new forms and old Tabula Rasa Press, 1981
- Desert Spring: Poems, with sketches by Malou Knappp (1993). Berkeley, CA: Sila Nova Press. pp. 59. OCLC 29819741
- Grasp the Subtle Lifeline with drawings by her daughter Malou.

=== Novels ===
- A Daughter of the Nobility. Holt, Rinehart and Winston. 1985. ISBN 978-0-03-003294-3.
- Lost Heritage. Sila-Nova Press. 1995. ISBN 978-0-9647178-0-0.
