= Diana Garcia (poet) =

American poet (born 1950)

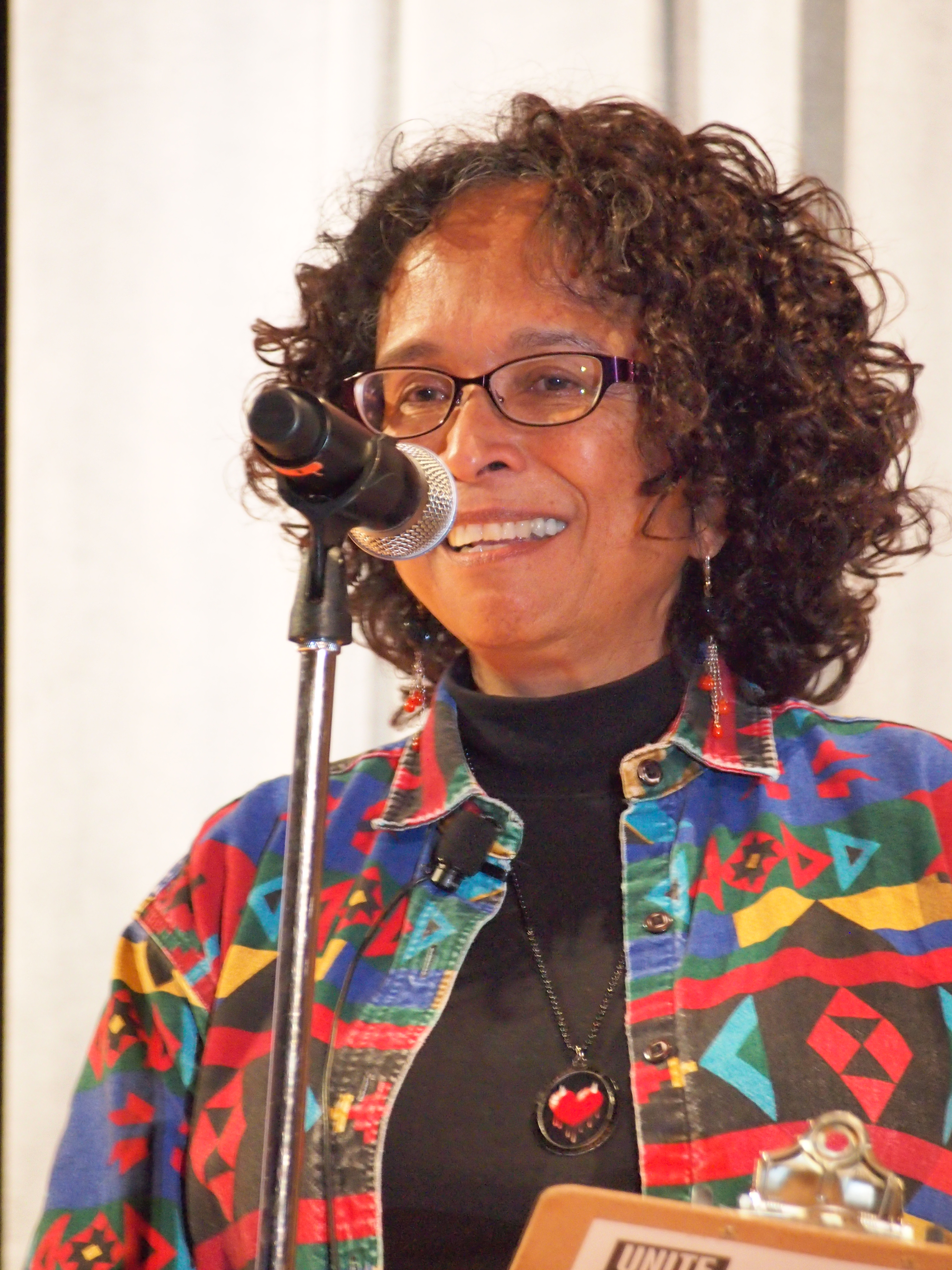
- Born: August 3, 1950 (age 76); San Joaquin County, California, United States
- Education: San Diego State University
- Writing career
- Genre: poetry
- Notable awards: American Book Award

Diana Garcia (born August 3, 1950) is an American poet.

== Life ==
She was raised in California and is the oldest of three children. Her parents were migrant field workers who lived in a farm labor camp, California Packing Company Camp #15, when she was born. She graduated from Merced High School in 1968 and attended Fresno State College for one year before leaving college to work and care for her son. She graduated from San Diego State University with an MFA in Creative Writing. She then was chosen to fill a one-year visiting professorship at Central Connecticut State University. Upon completion of that one-year contract she was hired as a full-time professor. She teaches creative writing at California State University, Monterey Bay.

== Awards ==
- 2001 American Book Award

== Works ==
- When living was a labor camp. University of Arizona Press. 2000. ISBN 978-0-8165-2043-5.
- Valley Language (2007)

=== Anthologies ===
- Rick Heide, ed. (2002). "Cotton Rows, Cotton Blankets". Under the fifth sun: Latino literature from California. Heyday Books. p. 262. ISBN 978-1-890771-59-1. "Diana Garcia."
- John S. Christie; José B. Gonzalez, eds. (2006). Latino boom: an anthology of U.S. Latino literature. Pearson/Longman. ISBN 978-0-321-09383-7.
- Gary Soto, ed. (1993). Pieces of the heart: new Chicano fiction. Chronicle Books. ISBN 978-0-8118-0068-6.
- Frances Payne Adler; Debra Busman; Diana García, eds. (2009). Fire and Ink: An Anthology of Social Action Writing. University of Arizona Press. ISBN 978-0-8165-2793-9.
- Ray González, ed. (1998). Touching the fire: fifteen poets of today's Latino renaissance. Anchor Books/Doubleday. ISBN 978-0-385-47862-5.
