= Joseph Papaleo =

Joseph Papaleo (1925–2004) was an Italian American novelist, and academic.

== Life ==
He grew up in The Bronx. He graduated from Sarah Lawrence College, from Columbia University with an M.A., and from the University of Florence with a Ph.D.

He taught at Sarah Lawrence College.

He lived in Bronxville, New York, and Oldsmar, Florida. His work appeared in Harper's, The New Yorker, Paris Review, Paterson Literary Review.

== Awards ==
- 2003 American Book Award
- 1973 Guggenheim Fellowship

== Works ==
- Italian stories. Dalkey Archive Press. 2002. ISBN 978-1-56478-306-6. "Joseph Papaleo."
- Unsettling America (Viking/Penguin, 1994)
- Picasso at Ninety One (Seaport Books, 1988)
- Joseph Papaleo; Lori Hackel, eds. (1990). Delphinium Blossoms. Delphinium Books. ISBN 978-1-883285-05-0.
- All the Comforts, Little, Brown, 1967
- Out of Place 1970
