= Carlton T. Spiller =

American poet and lawyer

- Education: Rutgers University; Seton Hall University (JD)
- Occupations: Poet; lawyer
- Writing career
- Notable awards: American Book Award (2006)

Carlton T. Spiller is an American poet and lawyer.

== Life ==
He graduated from Rutgers University, and from Seton Hall University with a J.D., in 1982. He is a member of the board of directors of the Nuyorican Poets Cafe.

== Awards ==
2006 American Book Award

== Works ==
- Scalding Heart. Nuyorican Press. ISBN 978-0-9627842-1-7.

=== Anthologies ===
- Miguel Algarín; Bob Holman, eds. (1994). "Panamian Nights". Aloud: voices from the Nuyorican Poets Cafe. Macmillan. ISBN 978-0-8050-3257-4.
