= L. Luis Lopez =

American writer

L. Luis Lopez is an American poet.

== Life ==
Lopez graduated from Spring Hill College, from St. John's College in Santa Fe, New Mexico with an MA, and from the University of New Mexico with a PhD.

He taught high school in Tampa, Florida, in Albuquerque, New Mexico, and in Grand Junction, Colorado. At the university level, he taught in the Academic Honors Program at the University of New Mexico and at Mesa State College.

lopez lives in Grand Junction, Colorado.

== Awards ==
- two NEH fellowships, one to study lyric poetry with Dr. Helen Vendler at Harvard, Summer 1983, and a second to study the literature of innocent suffering with Dr. Terrence Tilley (Duke University) at St. Michael's College.
- 2008 American Book Award

== Works ==
- Musings of a Barrio Sack Boy. Farolito Press. 2000. ISBN 978-0-9679844-0-7.
- A painting of sand: poems from Ghost Ranch. Farolito Press. 2000. ISBN 978-0-9679844-1-4.
- Each Month I Sing. Farolito Press. 2000. ISBN 978-0-9818339-1-0.

Anthologies

- Once Upon a Place (Night Owl Books, 2008)
- Charity (Red Rock Press, 2002)
- The Geography of Hope. Conundrum Press. 2000. ISBN 978-0-9657159-7-3.
- Talking From the Heart (Men's Network Press, 1990)
