= Lloyd A. Thompson =

Nigerian academic (1932–1997)

Lloyd Arthur Thompson (24 June 1932 Barbados – 28 August 1997) was a Nigerian classicist, and scholar.

== Life ==
He graduated from St John's College, Cambridge, with an MA. He taught at University of Ibadan Nigeria, for 40 years.

He married Alma Rosalind Platten on 1 September 1956; they had a daughter and two sons.

== Awards ==
- 1990 American Book Award

== Works ==
- Romans and blacks. Taylor & Francis. 1989. ISBN 978-0-415-03185-1.
