= Speer Morgan =

American writer

Speer Morgan (born January 25, 1946, in Fort Smith, Arkansas) is an American novelist, short story writer, and editor.

== Life ==
His parents were Charles Donald and Betty (Speer) Morgan. Morgan attended the University of the South in Sewanee, Tennessee, from 1964 to 1966, as well as the University of Arkansas in Fayetteville, where he received a BA in 1968. He received a PhD in 1972 from Stanford University.

Morgan was assistant professor at the University of Missouri in Columbia, Missouri from 1972 to 1978, was associate professor beginning in 1978, and as of 2019 is a professor of English and editor of The Missouri Review. He also taught at the Moberly Area Junior College (a men's correctional facility) in 1977 and was a member of the literature panel for the National Endowment for the Arts from 1975 to 1979.

Morgan has been editor-in-chief of The Missouri Review, since 1980. He also co-edited of The Best of the Missouri Review (University of Missouri Press, 1991) and For Our Beloved Country: Diaries of Americans in War (Atlantic Monthly Press, 1993). In the mid-1980s, Morgan established TMR Online on a commercial site called The Source, making it the first magazine in the world to have an online site.

Morgan has been a visiting writer at the University of Texas, the University of Arkansas, and the Paris Writers Workshop. He currently lives in Columbia, Missouri, with his wife Kristine, a writer and teacher.

== Awards ==
Morgan has won several awards, including the Best Story of the Year award from Prairie Schooner in 1978, for "Internal Combustion." He was a fiction fellow for the National Endowment for the Arts in 1994. He won an American Book Award from the Before Columbus Foundation in 1999 for The Freshour Cylinders and a Lawrence Foundation Prize in 2000 for "The Girl." His story "The Big Bang" received the Goodheart Prize for Shenandoah’s best story of 2008. Morgan has contributed short stories to several other magazines and journals, including Harper’s, the Atlantic Monthly, Northwest Review, New Letters, River Styx, and Iowa Review.

In 2019, Morgan was awarded the Distinguished Literary Achievement Award by the Missouri Humanities Council.

Other awards include:

- NEA Individual Fellowship in Fiction, 1990–91, based on novel manuscript-in -progress, "The Whipping Boy "
- Foreword Magazine's Silver Award, for The Freshour Cylinders

== Works ==
- Frog Gig and Other Stories. University of Missouri Press. 1976. ISBN 978-0-8262-0206-2.
- Belle Starr. Little, Brown. 1979. ISBN 978-0-316-58296-4.
- Whipping Boy. Houghton Mifflin. 1994. ISBN 978-0-395-67725-4.
- The Freshour Cylinders. MacAdam/Cage Publishing. 2000. ISBN 978-1-878448-99-6.
- The Assemblers. Dutton. 1986. ISBN 978-0-525-24468-4.

== Sources ==
=== General references ===
- Contemporary Authors. Vols. 97–100. Detroit: Gale Research Company, 1981.
- Fishmen, Ken. "Writing a First Novel, Part II." The Writer 92 (May 1979): 21–25.
