= Michael Mayo (poet) =

American poet and editor

- Born: Syracuse, New York, U.S.
- Education: University of Maine; University of New Brunswick; University of Delaware
- Occupations: Poet; editor
- Writing career
- Notable awards: American Book Award (1987)

Michael Mayo (born Syracuse, New York) is an American poet.

== Life ==
He studied at the University of Maine, University of New Brunswick, and the University of Delaware. He lived for ten years in San Francisco. Since 1993, he has lived in Puerto Vallarta.

== Awards ==
- 1987 American Book Award

== Works ==
- All Fall Down. Seismograph Publications. 1987. ISBN 978-0-932977-32-8.
- The Book of Awakenings
- Michael Mayo, ed. (July 1986). Practising Angels: A Contemporary Anthology of San Francisco Bay Area Poetry. Subterranean Co. ISBN 978-0-932977-31-1.
