= Nancy Carnevale =

American academic

Nancy Carnevale is an Associate Professor of History at Montclair State University, and winner of a 2010 American Book Award for A New Language, A New World: Italian Immigrants in the United States, 1890-1945 (University of Illinois Press, 2009).

She graduated from Rutgers College with a BA, from University of Michigan with an MA, and from Rutgers University with a PhD in US history. Her areas of expertise include the history of immigration, race, & ethnicity in the U.S., Italian American History, and U.S. Women's History.

== Works ==
- A new language, a new world: Italian immigrants in the United States, 1890-1945. University of Illinois Press. 2009. ISBN 978-0-252-03403-9.
