= Danit Brown =

American short story writer

- Education: Oberlin College; Indiana University Bloomington (MFA)
- Occupation: Short story writer
- Writing career
- Notable awards: American Book Award (2009)
- Website: www.danitbrown.com

Danit Brown is an American short story writer.

== Life ==
She graduated from Oberlin College, and Indiana University Bloomington with a Master of Fine Arts. She teaches at Albion College.

Her work has appeared Story, Glimmer Train, StoryQuarterly, and One Story.

She lives in Michigan with her family.

== Awards ==
- 2009 American Book Award

== Works ==
- Ask for a Convertible. Random House, Inc. 2008. ISBN 978-0-375-42454-0.
- Television for Women. Melville House, Inc. 2025. ISBN 978-1-68589-183-1.
