= Paul S. Flores =

American poet, playwright, and spoken-word artist

- Born: Chula Vista, California, U.S.
- Education: University of California, San Diego; San Francisco State University
- Occupations: Poet, playwright, spoken-word artist, educator
- Notable work: We Have Iré; Along the Border Lies; We Still Be
- Awards: American Book Award (2024); PEN Oakland/Josephine Miles Literary Award (2003); Doris Duke Artist Award (2015); Creative Capital Award (2019)

Paul Stojsavljevic Flores (born 1972) is a Mexican and Cuban American poet, playwright, spoken word artist, and educator whose work addresses issues of immigration, identity, violence, and healing in Latino and immigrant communities. Through bilingual performance, docu-theater, and community engagement, Flores explores themes of transnationalism, cultural memory, and social justice. He is the 2024 American Book Awards recipient for his debut poetry collection We Still Be: Poems and Performances. He also received the PEN Oakland/Josephine Miles Literary Award for his novel Along the Border Lies.

== Early life and education ==
Flores was raised in Chula Vista, California, near the U.S.-Mexico border. His upbringing and family heritage, Serbian on his father’s side and half Cuban-half Mexican on his mother’s, influence much of his work. He briefly played professional baseball with the Chicago Cubs in 1992 before pursuing higher education. He earned a B.A. in Literature and Writing from the University of California, San Diego, and later completed an M.F.A. in Creative Writing at San Francisco State University.

== Career ==
=== Performance and theater ===
Flores emerged as a spoken‑word artist in the mid‑1990s, co‑founding performance groups such as Youth Speaks, Brave New Voices and Los Delicados. He appeared on Seasons 3 and 4 of HBO’s Def Poetry and toured internationally, performing in Cuba, Mexico, and El Salvador. His work blends interview‑based theater with indigenous and Latino healing traditions to address topics like gentrification, incarceration, border militarization, and police violence.

He has authored several plays, including We Have Iré (premiered 2019), Plaças: The Most Dangerous Tattoo, and On the Hill: I Am Alex Nieto. These works have been commissioned and performed by institutions such as Yerba Buena Center for the Arts, Pregones Theater, Creative Capital, the National Endowment for the Arts, and the SF Arts Commission.

=== Writing ===
In 2003, Flores published his novel Along the Border Lies, which received the PEN Oakland/Josephine Miles Literary Award. His debut poetry collection, We Still Be: Poems and Performances (El Martillo Press, 2023), earned the American Book Award in 2024. The book is a fusion of performance poetry, memoir, and activism, reflecting on his experiences in San Francisco’s Mission District in the context of contemporary Latino life.

=== Teaching and community work ===
Flores serves as an adjunct professor of theater and spoken word at the University of San Francisco and San Francisco State University. He also works as a teaching artist within the Prison Arts Project at California Medical Facility and San Quentin State Prison. Additionally, he is cultural event producer at Acción Latina and curates Paseo Artistico, a free bilingual art stroll in the Mission District.

== Selected works ==
- We Have Iré (2019)
- PLACAS: The Most Dangerous Tattoo (2012)
- On The Hill: I Am Alex Nieto (2016)
- You’re Gonna Cry
- Along the Border Lies
- The Chicano Messengers of Spoken Word
- Los Delicados: Word Descarga
- We Still Be: Poems and Performances (2023)

== Recognition and honors ==
- Doris Duke Performing Artist Award (2015)
- Creative Capital Award for We Have Iré (2019)
- American Book Award for We Still Be (2024)
- MAP Fund (multiple years)
- National Association of Latino Arts and Cultures (NALAC) Catalyst for Change Award (2020)
- KQED Latino Heritage Local Hero Award (2014)
- Walter & Elise Haas Creative Work Fund
- California Arts Council grants (multiple years)

== Personal life ==
Flores resides in San Francisco, California, where he develop performance work and mentor youth as an arts educator.
