= Charley Trujillo =

American novelist

Charles Trujillo
- Born: November 6, 1949 (age 76); Hanford, California, United States
- Occupations: Author; publisher; director; producer
- Writing career
- Genre: Ethnic literature

Charley Trujillo (born November 6, 1949) is a Chicano novelist, editor, publisher, and filmmaker. He is known for his novel and documentary Soldados: Chicanos in Việt Nam.

== Early life ==
Charley Trujillo was born in Hanford, California in 1949, as one of seven children of Raymond and Guadalupe Trujillo. Raymond's family moved to Sweetwater, Texas from Silao Guanajuato, Mexico in 1908. Guadalupe's family had been in Texas since before the Texas Annexation in 1848. Raymond moved to California when he was one year old, received a sixth grade education, and eventually served in World War II. Guadalupe had only received a second grade education and moved to California when she turned fourteen. The family settled in Corcoran, California where they picked cotton.

Charley Trujillo was raised in Corcoran, in a typical Latino farm working family. He worked in the fields with his family and attended Corcoran High School. Growing up in the 1960s he endured corporal punishment from the educators for speaking Spanish in the classroom. He faced discrimination in school and out of this family and fellow Chicanos. The segregation was emotionally damaging, but helped him preserve his Hispanic culture despite being a second generation Latino.

== War experience ==
Two weeks after graduating high school in 1968, Trujillo enlisted in the U.S. Army. He signed up for the experience and to mature out of his hometown. He served in Germany as an infantryman in 1969, then volunteered for South Vietnam. He served there as a sergeant in the infantry, earning both a Purple Heart and Bronze Star Medal. During his time in South Vietnam, a piece of shrapnel landed in his right eye, destroying it and making him a disabled war veteran. He served in the U.S. Army from 1968 until 1970.

== Post-war ==
Trujillo had a difficult time on his arrival back to America. The first thing he did when coming out of the military was go to church, light a candle for his recently deceased grandmother, and give thanks.

He was bedridden with malaria three separate times. Once relieved of illness, Trujillo went to work in the fields, but decided that he did not want to do menial work for the rest of his life.

He realized how much the war negatively affected all those involved, and joined the Vietnam Veterans Against the War.

Trujillo pursued an education through the G.I. Bill and working part-time jobs. He attended Fresno City College from 1971 to 1972, then transferred to UC Berkeley where he received his BA in Chicano studies in 1976. He continued in the Teaching Credential Program in 1977. He continued his education at San Jose State University, earning his MA in Chicano Studies.

== Career ==
From 1978 to 1991 Trujillo was a professor of Ethnic Studies, Social Sciences and Chicano Studies at De Anza College. He felt as though Chicanos are a demographic who have been neglected in society. He decided to document the experience of the Chicano soldiers in the war. He put together Soldados: Chicanos in Việt Nam, an accumulation of 19 Chicano war stories. He went to over 70 publishers, all of whom rejected the book.

His frustration led him to create his own publishing company in 1990. Trujillo is the founder and current editor and publisher of Chusma House Publications. The company focuses on works of worth and significance, rather than novels designed for commercial purposes. It has now published over 30 titles by other authors of different ethnicities.

Nationally, 38 colleges and universities have used Soldados as a textbook. The book has also been successful in the popular literature market.

Trujillo also wrote Dogs From Illusion, another Viet Nam war novel.

He directed and co-produced the documentary Soldados: Chicanos in Việt Nam with Sonya Rhee, in 2003. It aired regionally on POV on PBS from 2003 to 2008, and then aired nationally on PBS in 2003 and 2004.

Trujillo has lectured at over 60 universities and colleges, nationally and internationally.

== Current work ==
Trujillo is currently writing a fictional memoir: The Real Life of a Dead Chicano: Patas de Perro.

He has two films in the making. One is a video documentary on Tiburcio Vasquez, the legendary bandit of 1800s California. The other is a feature film based on Dogs From Illusion.

Trujillo lives in San Jose, California.

== Awards ==
- 1991 American Book Award

== Works ==
- Charley Trujillo, ed. (1990). Soldados: Chicanos in Viet Nam and Dogs From Illusion. Chusma House Publications. ISBN 978-0-9624536-0-1.
- Dogs from illusion. Chusma House Publications. 1994. ISBN 978-0-9624536-5-6.

=== Anthologies ===
- Christian G. Appy, ed. (2004). "You Look Like a Gook". Patriots: the Vietnam War remembered from all sides. Penguin Group. ISBN 978-0-14-200449-4.
- George Mariscal, ed. (1999). "Frank Delgado". Aztlán and Viet Nam: Chicano and Chicana experiences of the war. University of California Press. ISBN 978-0-520-21405-7.
