= Douglas Woolf =

American author

- Born: March 23, 1922; New York City, U.S.
- Died: January 18, 1992 (aged 69); Urbana, Illinois, U.S.
- Education: Harvard University; University of New Mexico (BA); University of Arizona
- Spouse: Sandra Braman (m. 1976)

Douglas Woolf (March 23, 1922 – January 18, 1992) was an American author of short stories, novels and book reviews.

== Biography ==
Born in New York City, Woolf grew up in Larchmont, New York and attended Harvard University from 1939 to 1942. During World War II he served as an ambulance driver in North Africa for the American Field Service and then as a flight officer with the U.S. Army Air Force from 1943 to 1945. After the war Woolf studied at the University of New Mexico (BA 1950), and the University of Arizona for graduate work, until his thesis novel, The Hypocritic Days, was rejected.

For the most part Woolf lived the life he depicts in his writing, deliberately rejecting the expectations of mainstream America and preferring to live among and as society's misfits. He wandered incessantly, usually by car, preferring temporary marginal jobs of all kinds ― such as migrant farm worker, driver, ice cream seller, door-to-door market researcher — providing much of the experiences and detail of his fiction. In 1955 Robert Creeley published Woolf's first short novel, The Hypocritic Days with Divers Press, and Woolf would be often associated with the fiction wing of the New American Poetry, appearing in the anthologies The Moderns: An Anthology of New Writing in America (1963), edited by LeRoi Jones (Amiri Baraka) and New American Story (1965), edited by Donald M. Allen and Robert Creeley. His next two novels, Fade Out and Wall to Wall were published by Grove Press and often taken as representing his most characteristic work.

In 1976 he married his second wife, Sandra Braman, with whom Woolf ran a small press, Wolf Run Books, as well as short lived little magazine, Vital Statistics (3 issues, 1978–1979). The two continued Woolf's habitual itinerant life, taking on miscellaneous work, writing and appearing in numerous journals and steadily publishing volumes now and then, which continued until Woolf's health began to break down in the mid-1980s.

Woolf's novels are typically road narratives, whose protagonists seek an existence outside the encumbrances of material needs and middle class expectations. However, this is not the world of bohemians or the Beats, but rather of ordinary social rejects or eccentrics eking out lives outside of but constantly threatened by social control. Deserts and abandoned ghost towns appear prominently in his work as temporary refuges. The narratives do not rant against the modernity they reject, but rather are characterized by a sad, ironic humor as their characters improvise lives as best they can within the circumstances they find themselves.

== Awards ==
- 1980 American Book Award for Future Preconditional

== Bibliography ==
- The Hypocritic Days (Divers Press, 1955).
- Fade Out (Grove Press, 1959) (ISBN 0-87685-988-0)
- Wall to Wall (Grove Press, 1962) (ISBN 0-916583-07-4)
- Signs of a Migrant Worrier (Coyote Books, 1965). Stories.
- Ya! and John-Juan; Two Novels (Harper & Row, 1971; Rpt. with "Introduction" by Robert Creeley, Dalkey Archive, 2002) (ISBN 0-685-79056-8)
- Spring of the Lamb (Jargon Books, 1972).
- On Us (Black Sparrow Press, 1977) (ISBN 0-87685-285-1)
- HAD: A Tale (Wolf Run, 1977)
- Future Preconditional: A Collection (Coach House Press, 1978). Stories.
- The Timing Chain (Tombouctou Books, 1985) (ISBN 0-939180-36-7)
- Loving Ladies, to Maine and back & beyond (Zelot Books Williams Shields, 1986)
- Hypocritic Days & Other Tales, ed. Sandra Braman, "Preface" Edward Dorn (Black Sparrow Press, 1993) (ISBN 0-87685-911-2)
