= Giose Rimanelli =

Italian-American writer, poet, journalist (1925–2018)

Giose Rimanelli (November 25, 1925 – January 6, 2018) was an Italian-American writer, journalist, and poet from Casacalenda, Molise, Italy who wrote in Italian, English, and Molisan dialect. Rimanelli is best known for his novels, especially Tiro al piccione, which was adapted into film, and Benedetta in Guysterland, which won the 1994 American Book Award. In addition to his semi-autobiographical novels about abuse, the misuse of power, and "a young boy like himself who fought on the wrong side" (Rimanelli was deployed under Mussolini, eventually being captured by the Allies before escaping), his early works and later dialect poems focus on the abject condition of the Italian peasants after World War II and his nostalgia and longing for the Molise of his youth.
