= Leroy Quintana =

American poet, and Vietnam Veteran (born 1944)

Leroy V. Quintana (born June 10, 1944 in Albuquerque, New Mexico) is an American poet, and Vietnam Veteran.

== Life ==
He was raised in small northern New Mexico towns such as Ratón and Questa. He was drafted in the United States Army in 1967, and served in the 101st Airborne Division. He was deployed to Vietnam during the Vietnam War.

He graduated from University of New Mexico, and New Mexico State University with an M.A. in 1974. He teaches at San Diego Mesa College.

His work has appeared in Ploughshares, Prairie Schooner, Progressive, Puerto del Sol.

== Awards ==
- 1982 American Book Award for Paper Dance: 55 Latino Poets
- 1993 American Book Award for The History of Home

== Works ==
- "Hopper"; "Brownie"; "A Restaurant in Munich", Viet Nam Generation Journal & Newsletter V3, N3 (November 1991)
- "Poem for Josephine Baker". Ploughshares. Spring 1997.
- "Fuses". Ploughshares. Spring 2005.
- Great Whirl of Exile. Curbstone Press. 1999. ISBN 978-1-880684-60-3.
- My Hair Turning Gray Among Strangers. Bilingual Press/Editorial Bilingüe. 1996. ISBN 978-0-927534-57-4.
- History of Home. Bilingual Press/Editorial Bilingüe. 1993. ISBN 978-0-927534-36-9.
- Interrogations. Burning Cities Press. 1990. ISBN 978-0-9628524-5-9.
- Sangre. Prima Agua Press. 1981. ISBN 978-0-939652-00-6.
- Hijo del pueblo: New Mexico poems. Puerto Del Sol Press. 1976.

=== Short stories ===
- La Promesa and Other Stories. University of Oklahoma Press. October 2002. ISBN 978-0-8061-3449-9.

=== Editor ===
- Victor Hernandez Cruz; Leroy Quintana; Virgil Suarez, eds. (2008). Paper Dance: 55 Latino Poets. Paw Prints. ISBN 978-1-4395-0546-5.

=== Anthologies ===
- Billy Collins, ed. (2003). Poetry 180: a turning back to poetry. Random House Trade Paperbacks. ISBN 978-0-8129-6887-3.
- George Mariscal, ed. (1999). "Armed Foprces Recruitment Day, Albuquerque High School 1962". Aztlán and Viet Nam: Chicano and Chicana experiences of the war. University of California Press. ISBN 978-0-520-21405-7.
- Rick Heide, ed. (2002). "187". Under the fifth sun: Latino literature from California. Heyday Books. p. 332. ISBN 978-1-890771-59-1. "Leroy Quintana."
- Jack Webb, ed. (2007). The Best of Border Voices: Poet Laureates, Pulitzer Prize Winners & the Wisdom of Kids. Level4Press Inc. ISBN 978-1-933769-24-0.
