= Floyd Cheung =

American literary scholar, poet, and academic

- Born: Hong Kong
- Occupations: Literary scholar, poet, and academic

Academic background
- Education: B.A., English; M.A., English; PhD, English
- Alma mater: Whittier College; Tulane University

Floyd Cheung is an American literary scholar, poet, and academic. He is a professor in the English Department and American Studies Program, former Director of the Sherrerd Center for Teaching and Learning, and current Vice President for Equity and Inclusion at Smith College.

Cheung is most known for his works in English Language and Literature, with a primary focus on American studies, American literature, Asian American literature, and cultural analysis. He has edited numerous volumes featuring lesser-known authors, such as The Hanging on Union Square by H. T. Tsiang and John Okada: The Life and Rediscovered Work of the Author of No-No Boy.

== Education ==
Born in Hong Kong and raised in Las Vegas, Cheung obtained a BA in English from Whittier College in 1992 followed by a MA in English from Tulane University in 1993. Later, he obtained a PhD in English from the same institution in 1999.

== Career ==
Cheung began his academic career in 1996 as a visiting instructor at Mount Holyoke College's English Department and served until 1999. In the same year he joined Smith College, where he held multiple appointments, including serving as visiting lecturer for a brief period, assistant professor from 1999 to 2007, and associate professor from 2007 to 2017. As of 2017, he is professor in the English Department and American Studies Program at Smith College.

Cheung was the Sherrerd Center for Teaching and Learning Director at Smith College from 2014 to 2019. As of 2019 he has been the position of vice president for equity and inclusion at Smith College.

In 2012, he co-edited Naming Jhumpa Lahiri: Canons and Controversies with Lavina Dhingra.

== Research ==
Cheung's literary research has won him the 2006 Fred Ho Fellowship from Asian American Studies Institute at the University of Connecticut and the 2019 American Book Award from the Before Columbus Foundation. He has authored numerous publications spanning the field of Asian American literature, psychology, and American studies including essays and articles in peer-reviewed journals.

=== Asian-American studies ===
Cheung's literary research on Asian American studies has investigated the historical and political contexts that have shaped Asian American literature and has provided insights on the social, cultural, and political influences on the creation and reception of literary works. His early research focused on Tsiang's life and work, primarily his contributions to Chinese American culture and literature and concluded that despite possessing a complex and multifaceted persona, Tsiang made noteworthy advancements in Chinese American literature and culture, demonstrated exceptional writing skills, exhibited fervent activism, and displayed unwavering dedication as an intellectual. While analyzing the concept of "strategic hybridity" in early Japanese and Chinese American literature, he examined the works of Sadakichi Hartmann, Yung Wing, and H. T. Tsiang and lauded their efforts and contributions towards cultural advancement within their specific historical context on the complex and diverse struggles of Asian American identity during the period of exclusion.

Cheung's research on recovering early American literature has emphasized the necessity of recognizing and addressing the various biases, whether political, personal, or institutional, that hinder the appreciation of certain writers or forms of writing. Moreover, his work has stressed the importance of active engagement in scholarly discussions concerning interpretation and significance, while remaining cautious of the persistent risk of the "redisappearance" that constantly threatens the recognition and relevance of recovered authors or works. Focusing his research efforts on the origins of Chinese American autobiography, his work has provided an account of the field's development, spanning from its inception in the 1800s to the contemporary era and has offered an analysis of various aspect of Asian American literature encompassing themes such as autobiographical accounts, literature stemming from the internment of Japanese Americans, and performances centered around social protest.

=== Educational and everyday psychology ===
In his investigation of effective teaching strategies, Cheung's work provided techniques for professors to create safe conditions for students to start creating and listening to diverse ideas including the use of post-its to initiate conversation and inviting students to say more. The study also recommended implementing Peggy O'Neill's critical conversations model and Tasha Souza's ACTION response protocol to move a class discussion from a promising start toward true scholarly debate. Concentrating his research efforts on individualizing the teaching and learning process, he advocated the use of preparatory notes as a means to promote student preparation, offer personalized feedback, and foster a sense of trust between students and instructors. The study further suggested that preparatory notes serve as a low-risk approach to maintain students within the "zone of proximal development" and strengthen their perception of personal value. Furthermore, his work on everyday psychology has also included an exploration of the concept of microresistance, shedding light on its potential application in addressing microaggression in daily interactions, showcasing its varied forms that could be used before, during, or after a microaggressive incident. Additionally, he emphasized the importance of proactive alliances and acts of benevolence in supporting individuals facing microaggressions, while simultaneously empowering oneself.

== Awards and honors ==
- 2002 – Woodrow Wilson Career Enhancement Fellowship
- 2006 – Fred Ho Fellowship, Asian American Studies Institute, University of Connecticut
- 2012 – Sherrerd Prize for Distinguished Teaching, Smith College
- 2019 – American Book Award, Before Columbus Foundation

== Selected articles ==
- Cheung, F. (2019). Preparatory Notes as a Way to Individualize Teaching and Learning. The National Teaching and Learning Forum
- Cheung, F. (2019). Strategic Hybridity in Early Chinese and Japanese American Literature. Oxford Research Encyclopedia of Asian American Literature and Culture.
- Cheung, F., Souza, T., & Ganote, C. (2021). Proactive Microresistance in a Microaggressive World. Faculty Focus.

== Edited volumes ==
- And China Has Hands. By H. T. Tsiang. 1937. Edited by Floyd Cheung with introduction and textual notes. New York: Ironweed, 2003.
- Recovered Legacies: Authority and Identity in Early Asian American Literature. Eds. Keith Lawrence and Floyd Cheung. Philadelphia: Temple UP, 2005.
- Holy Prayers in a Horse's Ear. By Kathleen Tamagawa. 1932. Eds. Elena Creef, Greg Robinson, Shirley Lim, and Floyd Cheung. New Brunswick: Rutgers UP, 2008.
- Naming Jhumpa Lahiri: Canons and Controversies. Eds. Lavina Dhingra and Floyd Cheung. New York: Lexington-Rowman and Littlefield, 2012.
- The Hanging on Union Square. By H. T. Tsiang. 1935. Edited by Floyd Cheung with afterword, chronology, and textual notes. Los Angeles: Kaya, 2013.
- Sadakichi Hartmann: Collected Poems, 1886–1944. Edited by Floyd Cheung with introduction, chronology, and note on legacy. Stroud, UK: Little Island, 2016.
- And China Has Hands. By H. T. Tsiang. 1937. Edited by Floyd Cheung with afterword, chronology, and textual notes. Los Angeles: Kaya, 2016.
- John Okada: The Life and Rediscovered Work of the Author of No-No Boy. Edited by Frank Abe, Greg Robinson, and Floyd Cheung. Seattle: U of Washington P, 2018.
- Defiant Vision: Prints and Poetry by Munio Makuuchi. Curated by Aprile Gallant and Floyd Cheung. Smith College Museum of Art, 2019.
- The Oxford Encyclopedia of Asian American Literature and Culture. Edited by Josephine Lee, Floyd Cheung, Jennifer Ho, Anita Mannur, and Cathy Schlund-Vials. New York: Oxford UP, 2019.
- The Hanging on Union Square. By H. T. Tsiang. 1935. Edited by Floyd Cheung with afterword and textual notes. New York: Penguin Classics, 2019.
- The Literature of Japanese American Incarceration. Edited by Frank Abe and Floyd Cheung. New York: Penguin Classics, 2024
