= Alejandro Murguía =

American writer

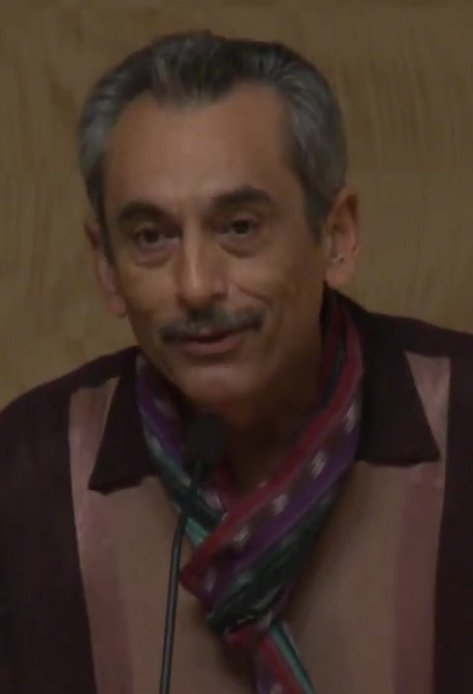
- Born: August 15, 1949 (age 77); United States
- Occupations: Poet; educator; short story writer; editor

Alejandro Murguía (born August 15, 1949), is an American poet, short story writer, educator, and editor. He is known for his writings about the San Francisco's Mission District.

== Biography ==
Alejandro Murguía was born on August 15, 1949, in the United States, and he was raised in Mexico after the death of his mother. He moved from Los Angeles to San Francisco in the early 1970s He has a B.A. degree and M.F.A. degree from San Francisco State University (SFSU).

Murguía teaches Latina/Latino Studies at San Francisco State University. In 2012, he was named San Francisco Poet Laureate by mayor Ed Lee.

== Awards ==
- 1991, 2003 American Book Award
- 2012 San Francisco Poet Laureate

== Works ==
- This War Called Love. City Lights Publishers. May 2002. ISBN 978-0-87286-394-1.
- The medicine of memory: a Mexica clan in California. University of Texas Press. 2002. ISBN 978-0-292-75267-2. "Alejandro Murguía."
- Alejandro Murguía; Barbara Paschke, eds. (1983). Volcán: poems from Central America : a bilingual anthology. Photographer Barbara Paschke. City Lights Books. ISBN 978-0-87286-153-4. "Alejandro Murguía."
- Southern Front. Bilingual Review Press. March 1990. ISBN 978-0-916950-97-2.
- Jose Montoya, Alejandro Murguia (1972). El Sol y los de Abajo and other R.C.A.F. poems / Oracion a la Mano Poderosa. Photographer Adal. Ediciones Pocho-Che.
- Stray Poems: San Francisco Poet Laureate Series No. 6. City Lights Publishers. May 2014. ISBN 978-0-87286-616-4.

=== Anthologies ===
- Manuel de Jesús Hernández-Gutiérrez; David William Foster, eds. (1997). "A Long Walk". Literatura chicana, 1965-1995: an anthology in Spanish, English, and Caló. Taylor & Francis. ISBN 978-0-8153-2077-7.
- Chris Carlsson, ed. (2005). "Into the Fray". The Political Edge. City Lights Books. p. 53. ISBN 978-1-931404-05-1. "Alejandro Murguía."
