= Shana L. Redmond =

American ethnomusicologist

- Born: April 6, 1980 (age 46); Racine, Wisconsin U.S.
- Awards: Guggenheim Fellowship (2023)

Academic background
- Education: Macalester College (BA) Yale University (PhD)

Academic work
- Discipline: Comparative Literature; Musicology
- Institutions: University of California, Los Angeles; Columbia University

Shana L. Redmond(Born April 6,1980) is an English and Comparative Literature professor at the Center for the Study of Ethnicity & Race at Columbia University. She is currently president of the American Studies Association and a recipient of a 2023 Guggenheim Fellowship.

== Biography ==
Redmond received her B.A. from Macalester College, where she trained as a vocalist, and her Ph.D. from Yale University. She is an interdisciplinary scholar of race, culture, and power with a specialization in the intersection of music and the black radical tradition. She also taught musicology and jazz studies at UCLA Herb Alpert School of Music.

Redmond is the author of Everything Man: The Form and Function of Paul Robeson (2020), which received multiple book awards, including a 2021 American Book Award from the Before Columbus Foundation.
