= Jessel Miller =

American writer (born 1949)

Jessel Miller (born 1949 Ontario, Canada) is an American watercolor artist and children's writer.

== Life ==
Her father was a country doctor/artist, and mother was a festive singer, poet and entertainer.

She graduated from the University of Florida and moved to Oakland, California in 1971.

She had a one-person show at the San Francisco Museum of Modern Art in 1980, "Bay Area Personalities", watercolor portraits of Maya Angelou, Herb Caen, Louise Cavis, Melvin Belli and Dianne Feinstein.

In 1984 she opened the Jessel Gallery in Napa, California. It began with 300 square feet (28 m^{2}) and 30 artists and 15 years later, the gallery is 9,000 square feet (840 m^{2}) and is 300 artists strong.

She writes and illustrates children's books.

== Awards ==
- 2002 American Book Award

== Works ==
- Mustard: Journey to Love. Jessel Gallery. 1999. ISBN 978-0-9660381-1-8.
- The calico cat. Jessel Gallery. 2000. ISBN 978-0-9660381-8-7.
- Carolynne Gamble, ed. (2001). Angels in the Vineyards. Jessel Gallery. ISBN 978-0-9660381-6-3.
- Mustard: lessons from old souls. Jessel Gallery. 1999. ISBN 978-0-9660381-5-6.
