= Ira Sukrungruang =

American writer (born 1976)

- Born: June 23, 1976 (age 50); Oak Lawn, Illinois
- Occupations: Writer and professor
- Writing career
- Genres: creative writing; non-fiction
- Website: Official website

Ira Sukrungruang (born June 23, 1976) is a Thai American who is a writer and professor at Kenyon College.

Sukrungruang was born in Oak Lawn, Illinois to Thai immigrant parents. His family is Buddhist. His mother was a champion bowler back in Thailand. She arrived in America a few years before his father. His mother came to America in 1968 to work as a nurse and moved back to Chiang Mai, Thailand after 36 years. He visits Thailand frequently. His father worked as a chemist in a tile factory.

Sukrungruang earned his Bachelor of Arts from Southern Illinois University Carbondale in 1998 and Master of Fine Arts from Ohio State University in 2002. He is the Richard L. Thomas Professor of Creative Writing at Kenyon College. Sukrungruang has a son, Bodhi, and ex-wife writer Katie Riegel. Riegel, who was from central Illinois, sent him a note asking for a divorce on their 12th anniversary and Sukrungruang was so depressed he considered suicide.

Sukrungruang has received numerous awards, including the Anita Claire Scharf Award for In Thailand It Is Night, the American Book Award for Southside Buddhist, and Chicago Writers Association Book of the Year in Nonfiction for This Jade World. He is the president of Sweet: A Literary Confection, founded in 2008, a non-profit literary organization with the aim of assisting marginalized people. He is also on the board of the Association of Writers and Writing Programs (AWP)—and Machete, an Ohio State University imprint that also focuses on marginalized people.

He is addicted to tattoos and once typed a story with one hand while his infant son was on his lap.

== Works ==
=== Non-fiction books ===
- Sukrungruang, Ira (2011). Talk Thai: The Adventures of Buddhist Boy. Columbia, Missouri: University of Missouri Press. ISBN 9780826272102.
- Sukrungruang, Ira (2014). Southside Buddhist. Tampa, Florida: University of Tampa Press. ISBN 9781597321242.
- Sukrungruang, Ira (2018). Buddha’s Dog & other Meditations. Tampa, Florida: University of Tampa Press. ISBN 9781597321563.
- Sukrungruang, Ira (2021). This Jade World. Lincoln, Nebraska: University of Nebraska Press. ISBN 9781496228840.

=== Short story collections ===
- Sukrungruang, Ira (2016). The Melting Season. New Orleans: Burlesque Press. ISBN 9780996485043.

=== Poetry books ===
- Sukrungruang, Ira (2013). In Thailand It Is Night. Tampa, Florida: University of Tampa Press. ISBN 9781597321068.

=== Essay collection ===
- Under and Up: Fatherhood and Fear in the Age of Distrust (due in 2027)

=== Anthologies ===
- Sukrungruang, Ira; Jarrell, Donna, eds. (2003). What Are You Looking At? The First Fat Fiction Anthology. Boston: Mariner Books. ISBN 9780156029070.
- Sukrungruang, Ira; Jarrell, Donna, eds. (2005). Scoot Over, Skinny: The Fat Nonfiction Anthology. Boston: Mariner Books. ISBN 9780156030229.

== Awards ==
- 2013 Anita Claire Scharf Award for In Thailand It Is Night
- 2015 American Book Award for Southside Buddhist
- 2022 Chicago Writers Association Book of the Year in Nonfiction for This Jade World
- New York Foundation for the Arts Fellowship in Nonfiction Literature
- Arts and Letters Fellowship
- Emerging Writer Fellowship
- Richard L. Thomas Professor of Creative Writing at Kenyon College
