= Stephen D. Gutiérrez =

Stephen D. Gutiérrez (born Montebello, California) is an American short story writer, professor at California State University, East Bay, and winner of a 2010 American Book Award. He won the 2010 Maxim Mazumdar New Play Competition.

He graduated from California State University, Chico with a BA in English in 1981, and from Cornell University with an MFA in 1987. He is married to the writer Jacqueline Doyle; they have one son.

== Works ==
- "From the book Live From Fresno y Los", Poets & Writers
- "MARCELLA'S ACT", LITnIMAGE
- Elements: short stories. University of Alabama Press. 1997. ISBN 978-1-57366-025-9.
- Live from Fresno y Los: stories, Bear Star Press, 2009, ISBN 978-0-9793745-3-1
- Captain Chicano Draws a Line in the American Sand. University of Tampa Press, 2024. ISBN 978-1597322034

=== Plays ===
- Game Day
- The Performance, San Francisco Theatre Festival

=== Anthologies ===
- Latinos in Lotus Land: An Anthology of Contemporary Southern California Literature.
