= Christopher Mogil =

American philanthropist, and author

Christopher Mogil is an American philanthropist, and author. His book, We Gave Away a Fortune won a 1993 American Book Award. He was the co-director of the Impact Project, and is the founder of Bolder Giving.

== Works ==
- Christopher Mogil, Anne Slepian, Peter Woodrow We gave away a fortune, New Society Publishers, 1992, ISBN 978-0-86571-221-8
