= Darryl Dickson-Carr =

American author, professor, and critic (born 1968)

- Born: 1968 (age 57–58)
- Education: University of California, Santa Barbara (PhD)
- Occupations: Author; professor; literary critic
- Writing career
- Notable awards: American Book Award (2006)

Darryl Dickson-Carr (born 1968) is an American author, professor, and literary critic.

== Life ==
Dr. Dickson-Carr graduated from University of California, Santa Barbara, with a Ph.D. in English with a focus on African American satire. He taught at Florida State University before joining the English faculty at Southern Methodist University, where he is currently the E. A. Lilly Distinguished Professor of English.

== Awards ==
- 2006 American Book Award, for The Columbia Guide to Contemporary African American Fiction

== Works ==
- Dickson-Carr, Darryl (2001). African American satire: the sacredly profane novel. University of Missouri Press. ISBN 978-0-8262-1325-9.
- Darryl Dickson-Carr, ed. (2005). The Columbia guide to contemporary African American fiction. Columbia University Press. ISBN 978-0-231-12472-0. "Darryl Dickson-Carr."
- David Seed, ed. (2009). "Ishmael Reed: American Iconoclast". A Companion to Twentieth-Century United States Fiction. John Wiley and Sons. ISBN 978-1-4051-4691-3.
- "The Projection of the Beast: Subverting Mythologies in Toni Morrison’s Jazz.”, CLA Journal 49:2 (December 2005). 168-83.
- “Introduction.” Ebony Rising: Short Fiction from the Greater Harlem Renaissance Era, 1912-1940, Craig Gable ed. Indiana University Press, 2004.
