= Truong Tran =

American poet

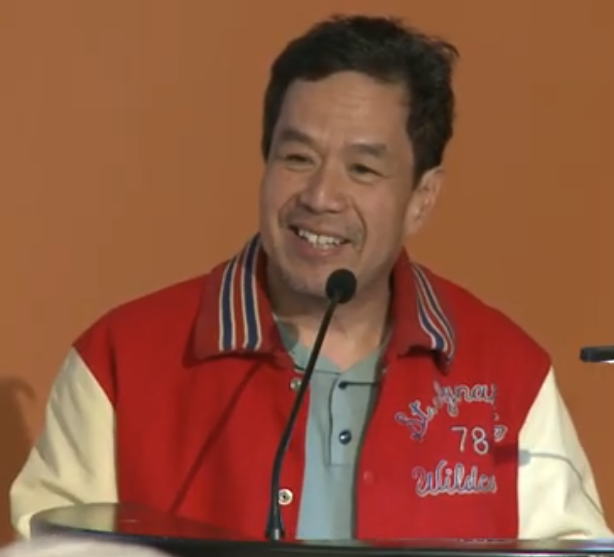
- At a reading at the San Francisco Public Library in 2025
- Born: 1969 (age 56–57); Saigon, Vietnam
- Education: UC Santa Cruz
- Occupations: Poet, Visual artist
- Writing career
- Notable works: Placing the Accents (1999) dust and consciousness (2002)
- Notable awards: San Francisco Poetry Center Book Prize (2002); Western States Book Prize Finalist in Poetry (1999)

Truong Tran (born 1969) is a Vietnamese-American poet, visual artist, and teacher. He is an author of five collections of poetry and a children's book. As a visual artist Tran is best known for mixed media pieces though he has worked in multiple mediums. His work is in private collections, and he has been honored with solo shows and an exhibition catalog "I Meant to Say Please Pass the Sugar: Mixed Media Works 2009- Present" (2014).

== Early life and career ==
Tran was born in Saigon prior to his family emigrating to the United States and settling in the San Francisco Bay Area. Tran currently lives in San Francisco, where he teaches creative writing at San Francisco State University and Mills College in Oakland. He has also taught at UC Berkeley Extension CSU Long Beach and Goddard College.

Tran received a Bachelor of Arts degree from the University of California, Santa Cruz in 1992. He received a Master of Fine Arts degree from San Francisco State University in 1995.

== Poetry and prose ==
Truong Tran's poetry has been translated into Spanish, Dutch and French. Tran was the featured poet at the Poetry International Festival in Rotterdam in 2011. Tran's collection dust and conscience (2002) won the San Francisco Poetry Center Book Prize.The Book of Perceptions (1999), was a finalist for a Kiriyama Prize and placing the accents (1999), was a finalist for a Western States Book Award for Poetry. The correspondence between Truong Tran and poet Wanda Colman is included in the collection, Letters to Poets: Conversations About Poetics, Politics, and Community (2008).

== Visual art ==
In February 2010, Tran debuted his first solo exhibition as a visual artist, "the lost and the found", at the Kearney Street Workshop in San Francisco. In February 2013 he had a joint show with Peter Max Lawrence "AT WAR" at SOMArts, in San Francisco. In 2014, his show at the Telegraph Hill Gallery garnered international attention, in part because it featured "9,000 paper butterflies individually cut from old pornographic magazines" as a protest of what Tran considered the "obscenity" of the destruction of 9000 living butterflies by Damien Hirst as a by-product of a piece of Hirst's art. In March 2015, Tran's work was exhibited in a joint show with artist Jaime Cortez to innaguerate the new gallery space in California Institute of Integral Studies.

== Honors and awards ==
- San Francisco Arts Commission Grants
- Ina Coolbrith Prize in Poetry, 1992
- Browning Society Prize in Poetry, 1994
- Kiriyama Book Prize Finalist, 1998
- Western States Book Prize Finalist in Poetry, 1999
- San Francisco Library Laureate, 2000
- San Francisco Poetry Center Prize for dust and consciousness, 2002
- Intersection for the Arts Writer In Residence, 2003
- San Francisco Arts Commission Cultural Equity Grant, 2003
- The Fund For Poetry Grant, 2007

== Bibliography ==
Poetry

- The Book of Perceptions (1999)
- Placing the Accents (1999)
- dust and conscience (2002)
- within the margins (2004)
- Four Letter Words (2008)
- 100 Words (2021)
- The Book of the Other: Small in Comparison (2021)

Children's Books

- Going Home Coming Home (2003)

Art

- I Meant to Say Please Pass the Sugar (2014)
