= Javier O. Huerta =

Mexican American and Chicano poet

Javier O. Huerta is a Mexican American and Chicano poet. His first book Some Clarifications y otros poemas (Arte Publico 2007) was awarded the Chicano/Latino Literary Prize from the University of California, Irvine.

== Personal background ==
Huerta was born in Nuevo Laredo, Tamaulipas, Mexico and immigrated to the United States with his mother and younger brother, crossing the Rio Grande (Rio Bravo) in 1981. In 1986, he gained legal residency under the Immigration Reform and Control Act of 1986 and became a US citizen in January 2000 after serving four years in the United States Navy. As of 2012, he resides in the Bay Area, California.

== Professional background ==
Huerta also studies the laughter of poetry in the English PhD program at the University of California, Berkeley, where he teaches the following courses, "Politics and Poetics of Refusal," "Documents and the Literature of the Undocumented," and "Laughter and Literature."
