= Phil Henderson (writer) =

American novelist, illustrator, essayist, and poet

- Born: November 2, 1967 (age 59); Atlanta, Georgia, United States
- Occupations: Novelist; essayist; poet; illustrator
- Writing career
- Pen name: Philip Lewis, P. Lewis
- Genres: Fiction, non-fiction, poetry

Phil Henderson (born November 2, 1967, in Atlanta, Georgia), also writing as Philip Lewis or P. Lewis, is an American novelist, illustrator, essayist, and poet. His literary work is known for its relentless, caustic satire of contemporary American culture. His artistic work, however, is noted for its erotic emphasis on voluptuous women, especially "Lauren".

== Biography ==
He grew up in Adelphi, Maryland. His father, Dr. Stephen E. Henderson, was the author of Understanding the New Black Poetry. From 1985 to 1992 Phil Henderson attended Howard University in Washington D.C. Henderson dropped out a number of times to travel the world during these years, going first to Germany, Holland and Belgium, then France, Italy, Spain, Morocco, Algeria, Tunisia, Greece, Turkey, Syria, and Romania. In late 1987 to early 1988, he lived in Cairo, Egypt.

Upon his return to the United States he edited a small literary magazine called Cafe Noir.

After graduating from Howard University in 1992, Henderson became a member of the Fiction Collective Two, with whom he published his first novel, Life of Death, under a nom-de-plume. Between 1993 and 2004 Henderson published only sporadically in small journals. In 1999 he began doing erotic illustrations celebrating the well-fleshed, voluptuous woman. Many of these illustrations were published in his book Extreme Curves in 2004.

In 2006, Phil Henderson, as P. Lewis, won the American Book Award for his second published novel, Nate. The novel took five years to write and went through eight different drafts. It was finished in 1998, yet rejected so relentlessly that Henderson published it under his own imprint, eight years later.

He has recently completed a novel about Berlin, Germany, entitled Berlin Asylum. Henderson has been based in Berlin since 2002. Since moving to Berlin he has appeared at various venues both in Berlin and the United States, including Tacheles, Literatur-Haus, Schokoladen, English Theatre Berlin (with Lady Gaby's FUEL), Bowery Poetry Club, and others. In April 2009, he appeared at Amerika Haus Berlin.

== Bibliography ==
- Life of Death, 1993
- Extreme Curves. Amerotica. October 31, 2004. ISBN 978-1-56163-416-3.
- Nate. Back House Books. January 15, 2006. ISBN 978-0-9671951-0-0.
- Extreme Curves: Phat Girls. Amerotica. September 2008. ISBN 978-1-56163-545-0.
