= Sandra Scofield =

American author

Sandra Scofield is an American novelist, essayist, editor and author of writers’ guides.

== Biography ==
Sandra Scofield was born to Edith Aileen Hambleton in Wichita Falls, Texas, in 1943.

Scofield taught in public schools and colleges, but stopped working in 1983 to write full-time. Her first novel was Gringa, based on her observations and experiences in 1960s Mexico. Since then she has published six more novels and a memoir, in addition to numerous book reviews, scholarly publications, and short stories.

She occasionally teaches writing in summer workshops, visits MFA programs, has mentored individual writers, and has written a book for writers, The Scene Book, published by Penguin in 2007. She is organizing letters written to her close friend Mary Economidy in the 1960s, and completing writing projects.

She frequently reviews books for national newspapers including the Dallas Morning News, Chicago Tribune, Newsday, and The Boston Globe.

=== Awards ===
Her awards include a National Endowment for the Arts Fellowship (1991); Beyond Deserving was a 1991 finalist for a National Book Award; and A Chance to See Egypt received the Best Fiction award from the Texas Institute of Letters in 1996.

== Bibliography ==
=== Novels and other fiction ===
- Gringa. Sag Harbor, NY: Permanent Press, 1989.
- Beyond Deserving. Sag Harbor, NY: Permanent Press, 1991.
- Walking Dunes. Sag Harbor, NY: Permanent Press, 1992.
- More Than Allies. Sag Harbor, NY: Permanent Press, 1993.
- Opal on Dry Ground. New York: Villard Books, 1994.
- A Chance to See Egypt. New York: HarperCollins, 1996.
- Plain Seeing. New York: Cliff Street Books, 1997.
- Swim: Stories of the Sixties. Ashland, OR: Wellstone Press, 2017.

=== Essays, compilations and memoirs ===
- Occasions of Sin: a Memoir. New York: Norton, 2004.
- The Scene Book: A Primer for the Fiction Writer. New York: Penguin Books, 2007.
- Children of the Dust: an Okie Family Story (ed.) by Betty Grant Henshaw. Lubbock: Texas Tech University Press, 2006.
- Mysteries of Love and Grief: Reflections on a Plainswoman's Life. Texas University Press, 2015.
- The Last Draft: A Novelist's Guide to Revision. New York: Penguin Books, 2017.
