= Kesho Y. Scott =

American sociologist

Kesho Scott
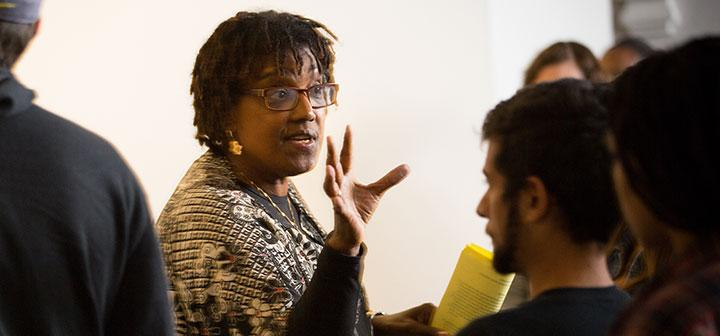
- Education: Wayne State University, BA; University of Detroit, MA; University of Iowa, PhD
- Scientific career
- Fields: Sociology, American Studies, Anthropology

Kesho Yvonne Scott (born 1953) is associate professor of American studies and sociology at Grinnell College. Scott's interests include Black women in America, multiculturalism, and unlearning racism.

She is the first African-American woman to receive tenure at Grinnell.

== Early life and education ==
Scott received her BA from Wayne State University, M.A. in political sociology from the University of Detroit, and her Ph.D. in American studies from the University of Iowa in 1988.

== Career ==
After receiving her doctoral degree she became Distinguished American Studies Scholar in Residence at Pennsylvania State University in Harrisburg (1989), visiting professor at Nanjing University in China (1994), and Fulbright visiting professor at Addis Ababa University in Ethiopia (2001–2002).

Scott has been a faculty member for Semester at Sea (Spring 1991, Fall 2008, and Spring 2015), as well as a trainer and consultant for the program. Scott has appeared on The Oprah Winfrey Show, the Sonya Live show, the Last Call show, and on TBS's Family of Women show hosted by Jane Fonda.

On January 21, 2017, Scott spoke at the Women's March in Des Moines, Iowa.

== Awards ==
- Iowa Woman of the Year (1986).
- American Book Award (1988) for Tight Spaces
- Cristine Wilson Medal for Equality and Justice (2008)
- Iowa African-American Hall of Fame Inductee (2016)

== Bibliography ==
- The Habit of Surviving: Black Women's Strategies for Life (1991)
- Tight Spaces (1987, reissued 1999)
