= Manuel Luis Martinez =

American novelist and literary critic

- Born: June 26, 1966 (age 60); San Antonio, Texas, U.S.
- Education: St. Mary's University (BA); Ohio State University (MA); Stanford University (PhD)
- Occupations: Novelist; literary critic
- Writing career
- Genre: Fiction

Manuel Luis Martinez (June 26, 1966) is an American novelist and literary critic. He was born in San Antonio, Texas, and is the author of four novels: Crossing, (Bilingual Press, 1998), Drift, (Picador USA, 2003), Day of the Dead, (Floricanto Press, 2010) and Los Duros (Floricanto Press, 2014). His fiction deals primarily with the lives of Mexican Americans and Mexican immigrants, and explores the themes of migration, contemporary urban life, and the experience of dislocation. He is also the author of a book of literary criticism, Countering the Counterculture: Rereading Postwar American Dissent from Jack Kerouac to Tomas Rivera, (University of Wisconsin Press, 2003).

== Personal ==
He received a bachelor's degree in History and Literature from St. Mary's University (1988), a master's degree in creative writing from Ohio State University (1989), and a PhD in American Literature from Stanford University (1997). He teaches American Literature, Chicano Studies, and Creative Writing at the Ohio State University in Columbus, Ohio.

== Novels ==
Crossing

Plot Summary: Luis Lomos, a sixteen-year-old boy from a small Mexican town, undertakes the journey to the United States. Trapped in a railroad car with twelve other undocumented workers, he meets an old man named Berto Morales who has a terrible secret that he feels he must confess before he dies. The short trip becomes interminable as the men slowly suffocate to death. The tale is based on a true event.

Drift

Plot Summary: Robert Lomos, a troubled young man, decides to run away from his grandmother's care in San Antonio, Texas, to find his estranged mother who has left for Los Angeles. His plan is to convince her that he will assume the responsibilities of a "man" and that he will care for her and his infant brother.

Day of the Dead

Plot Summary: A prequel to Crossing. Berto Morales, a major character in Martinez's first novel, narrates the year he spends searching for the murderer of his pregnant wife during the Mexican Revolution. The novel begins in 1912 on the Day of the Dead and ends on the same date in 1913. Bent on revenge, Berto finds that what he most wants is a form of redemption. He gets that opportunity when he meets Isabella, a young widow with a daughter in need of protection during the uptick in violence that follows the assassination of President Francisco Madero in 1912.

Los Duros

Plot summary: Two young men living in a California shantytown must deal with the effects of a double murder.

== Critical work ==
Countering the Counterculture: Rereading Postwar American Dissent from Jack Kerouac to Tomas Rivera

Martinez explores the theme of "movement" and "mobility" in defining the American counterculture. He argues that Mexican and Chicano migrant writers practice a form of dissent that emphasizes the role of forced movement that underscores the limitations of democratic discourse. His central critique of the "American counterculture" centers on the work of several Beat writers whom Martinez claims ignore the political limits of individualism thus subverting their own social criticism of American corporatism and conformity.

== Anthologies ==
- Hecho en Tejas
- Latinos in Lotusland

== Awards ==
- Crossing selected as one of the ten best books by a writer of color, PEN American Center, NY (1999).
- Drift chosen as one of the top 100 books by the American Library Association, 2004.
- Los Duros awarded the American Book Award, 2015
- Inducted into the Texas Institute of Letters in 2012
