= Anisfield-Wolf Book Award =

American literary award

External videos
- 77th annual Anisfield-Wolf Book Awards, September 13, 2012, C-SPAN
- 78th annual Anisfield-Wolf Book Awards, September 12, 2013, C-SPAN
- 83rd annual Anisfield-Wolf Book Awards, October 27, 2018, C-SPAN
- 84th annual Anisfield-Wolf Book Awards, September 26, 2019, C-SPAN

The Anisfield-Wolf Book Award is an American literary award dedicated to honoring written works that make important contributions to the understanding of racism and the appreciation of the rich diversity of human culture. Established in 1935 by Cleveland poet and philanthropist Edith Anisfield Wolf and originally administered by the Saturday Review, the awards have been administered by the Cleveland Foundation since 1963.

The foundation confers awards in several categories, such as fiction, poetry, nonfiction, memoir/autobiography, and lifetime achievement, each September in a ceremony free and open to the public and attended by the honorees. Winners previously include Zora Neale Hurston (1943), Langston Hughes (1954), Martin Luther King Jr. (1959), Maxine Hong Kingston (1978), Wole Soyinka (1983), Nadine Gordimer (1988), Toni Morrison (1988), Ralph Ellison (1992), Edward Said (2000), and Derek Walcott (2004).

The jury has been composed of prominent American writers and scholars since 1991, when long-time jury chairman Ashley Montagu, a renowned anthropologist, asked poet Rita Dove and scholar Henry Louis Gates Jr. to help him judge the large number of books submitted annually by publishers across the disciplines. When Montagu retired in 1996, Gates assumed the chair position. In 1996, evolutionary biologist Stephen Jay Gould, writer Joyce Carol Oates, and historian Simon Schama (all of whom retired before the 2024 awards) joined. After Gould died in 2002, psychologist Steven Pinker replaced him on the jury. At the 2024 awards, Pinker and Dove retired. The current jury is Natasha Trethewey (jury chair), Peter Ho Davies, Tiya Miles, Charles King, Deesha Philyaw, and Luis Alberto Urrea.

== Winners ==
=== Fiction ===
Fiction winners
Year	Author	Title	Ref.
1945	Gwethalyn Graham	Earth and High Heaven	
1947	Sholem Asch	East River	
1948	Worth Tuttle Hedden	The Other Room	
1949	Alan Paton	Cry, the Beloved Country	
1951	John Hersey	The Wall	
1954	Langston Hughes	Simple Takes a Wife	
1962	Gina Allen	The Forbidden Man	
1969	Gwendolyn Brooks	In the Mecca	
1985	Breyten Breytenbach	Mouroir: Mirrornotes of a Novel	
1988	Nadine Gordimer	A Sport of Nature	
1988	Toni Morrison	Beloved	
1990	Dolores Kendrick	The Women of Plums: Poems in the Voices of Slave Women	
1993	Sandra Cisneros	Woman Hollering Creek and Other Stories	
1994	Judith Ortiz Cofer	The Latin Deli: Prose and Poetry	
1995	Reginald Gibbons	Sweetbitter: A Novel	
1996	Madison Smartt Bell	All Souls' Rising	
1997	Jamaica Kincaid	Autobiography of My Mother	
1998	Walter Mosley	Always Outnumbered, Always Outgunned	
1999	Russell Banks	Cloudsplitter	
2000	Chang-Rae Lee	A Gesture Life	
2002	Colson Whitehead	John Henry Days	
2003	Stephen L. Carter	The Emperor of Ocean Park	
2003	Reetika Vazirani	World Hotel	
2004	Edward P. Jones	The Known World	
2005	Edwidge Danticat	The Dew Breaker	
2006	Zadie Smith	On Beauty	
2007	Chimamanda Ngozi Adichie	Half of a Yellow Sun	
2007	Martha Collins	Blue Front	
2008	Junot Díaz	The Brief Wondrous Life of Oscar Wao	
2008	Mohsin Hamid	The Reluctant Fundamentalist	
2009	Louise Erdrich	The Plague of Doves	
2009	Nam Le	The Boat	
2010	Kamila Shamsie	Burnt Shadows	
2011	Mary Helen Stefaniak	The Cailiffs of Baghdad, Georgia	
2011	Nicole Krauss	Great House	
2012	Esi Edugyan	Half-Blood Blues	
2013	Laird Hunt	Kind One	
2013	Kevin Powers	The Yellow Birds	
2014	Anthony Marra	A Constellation of Vital Phenomena	
2015	Marlon James	A Brief History of Seven Killings	
2016	Mary Morris	The Jazz Palace	
2017	Peter Ho Davies	The Fortunes	
2017	Karan Mahajan	The Association of Small Bombs	
2018	Jesmyn Ward	Sing, Unburied, Sing	
2019	Tommy Orange	There There	
2020	Namwali Serpell	The Old Drift	
2021	James McBride	Deacon King Kong	
2022	Percival Everett	The Trees	
2023	Lan Samantha Chang	The Family Chao	
2023	Geraldine Brooks	Horse	
2024	Teju Cole	Tremor	
2025	Danzy Senna	Colored Television	
2026	Carrie R. Moore	Make Your Way Home	

=== Poetry ===
Poetry winners
Year	Author	Title	Ref.
2013	Eugene Gloria	My Favorite Warlord	
2014	Adrian Matejka	The Big Smoke	
2015	Jericho Brown	The New Testament	
2015	Marilyn Chin	Hard Love Province	
2016	Rowan Ricardo Phillips	Heaven	
2017	Tyehimba Jess	Olio	
2018	Shane McCrae	In the Language of My Captor	
2019	Tracy K. Smith	Wade in the Water	
2020	Ilya Kaminsky	Deaf Republic	
2021	Victoria Chang	Obit	
2022	Donika Kelly	The Renunciations	
2023	Saeed Jones	Alive at the End of the World	
2024	Monica Youn	From From	
2025	Janice N. Harrington	Yard Show	
2026	Gbenga Adesina	Death Does Not End at the Sea	

=== Memoir/Autobiography ===
Memoir/Autobiography winners
Year	Author	Title	Ref.
2025	Tessa Hulls	Feeding Ghosts	
2026	Sarah Aziza	The Hollow Half: A Memoir of Bodies and Borders	

=== Nonfiction ===
Nonfiction winners
Year	Author	Title	Ref.
1936	Harold Foote Gosnell	Negro Politicians: Rise of Negro Politics in Chicago	
1937	Julian Huxley and A. C. Haddon	We Europeans: A Survey of "Racial" Problems	
1939	Ralph J. Bunche	An Analysis of the Political, Economic and Social Status of the Non-European Peoples in South Africa	
1939	Charles S. Johnson	The Negro College Graduate	
1940	Edward Franklin Frazier	The Negro Family in the United States	
1941	Louis Adamic	From Many Lands	
1942	James G. Leyburn	The Haitian People	
1942	Leopold Infeld	Quest: An Autobiography	
1943	Zora Neale Hurston	Dust Tracks on a Road: An Autobiography	
1944	Roi Ottley	New World A-Coming	
1944	Maurice Samuel	The World of Sholom Aleichem	
1945	Gunnar Myrdal	An American Dilemma	
1946	St. Clair Drake and Horace Cayton	Black Metropolis: A Study of Negro Life in a Northern City	
1946	Wallace Stegner and the editors of Look	One Nation	
1947	Pauline R. Kibbe	Latin Americans in Texas	
1948	John Collier	The Indians of the Americas	
1949	J.C. Furnas	Anatomy of Paradise	
1950	S. Andhil Fineberg	Punishment Without Crime	
1950	Shirley Graham	Your Most Humble Servant	
1951	Henry Gibbs	Twilight in South Africa	
1952	Laurens Van Der Post	Venture to the Interior	
1952	Brewton Berry	Race Relations	
1953	Farley Mowat	People of the Deer	
1953	Han Suyin	A Many-Splendoured Thing	
1954	Vernon Bartlett	Struggle for Africa	
1955	Oden Meeker	Report on Africa	
1955	Lyle Saunders	Cultural Differences and Medical Care	
1956	John P. Dean and Alex Rosen	A Manual of Intergroup Relations	
1956	George W. Shepherd	They Wait in Darkness	
1957	Father Trevor Huddleston	Naught for Your Comfort	
1957	Gilberto Freyre	The Masters and the Slaves: A Study in the Development of Brazilian Civilization	
1958	South African Institute of Race Relations	Handbook on Race Relations	
1958	Jessie B. Sams	White Mother	
1959	Martin Luther King Jr.	Stride Toward Freedom: The Montgomery Story	
1959	George Eaton Simpson and J. Milton Yinger	Racial and Cultural Minorities: An Analysis of Prejudice and Discrimination	
1960	John Haynes Holmes	I Speak for Myself	
1960	Basil Davidson	The Lost Cities of Africa	
1961	E. R. Braithwaite	To Sir, With Love	
1961	Louis E. Lomax	The Reluctant African	
1962	Dwight L. Dumond	Antislavery: The Crusade for Freedom in America	
1962	John Howard Griffin	Black Like Me	
1963	Theodosius Dobzhansky	Mankind Evolving	
1964	Harold R. Isaacs	The New World of Negro Americans	
1964	Bernard E. Olson	Faith and Prejudice	
1964	Nathan Glazer and Daniel P. Moynihan	Beyond the Melting Pot: The Negroes, Puerto Ricans, Jews, Italians, and Irish of New York City	
1965	Milton M. Gordon	Assimilation in American Life: The Role of Race, Religion and National Origins	
1965	James M. McPherson	The Struggle for Equality: Abolitionists and the Negro in the Civil War and Reconstruction	
1965	Abram L. Sachar	A History of the Jews, Revised Edition	
1965	James W. Silver	Mississippi: The Closed Society	
1966	H. C. Baldry	The Unity of Mankind in Greek Thought	
1966	Claude Brown	Manchild in the Promised Land	
1966	Malcolm X and Alex Haley	The Autobiography of Malcolm X	
1966	Amram Scheinfeld	Your Heredity and Environment	
1967	David Brion Davis	The Problem of Slavery in Western Culture	
1967	Oscar Lewis	La Vida	
1968	Norman Rufus Colin Cohn	Warrant for Genocide: The Myth of the Jewish World Conspiracy and the Protocols of the Elders of Zion	
1968	Robert Coles	Children of Crisis: A Study of Courage and Fear	
1968	Raul Hilberg	The Destruction of the European Jews	
1968	Erich Kahler	The Jews among the Nations	
1969	E. Earl Baughman and W. Grant Dahlstrom	Negro and White Children: A Psychological Study in the Rural South	
1969	Leonard Dinnerstein	The Leo Frank Case	
1969	Stuart Levine and Nancy O. Lurie	The American Indian Today	
1970	Dan T. Carter	Scottsboro: A Tragedy of the American South	
1970	Vine Deloria	Custer Died for Your Sins: An Indian Manifesto	
1970	Florestan Fernandes	The Negro in Brazilian Society	
1970	Audrie Girdner and Anne Loftis	The Great Betrayal: The Evacuation of the Japanese-Americans during World War II	
1971	Robert William July	A History of the African People	
1971	Carleton Mabee	Black Freedom: The Nonviolent Abolitionists from 1830 through the Civil War	
1971	Stan Steiner	La Raza: The Mexican Americans	
1971	Anthony Wallace	The Death and Rebirth of the Seneca	
1972	George M. Fredrickson	The Black Image in the White Mind: The Debate on Afro-American Character and Destiny, 1817	
1972	John S. Haller	Outcasts from Evolution: Scientific Attitudes of Racial Inferiority, 1859–1900	
1972	Donald L. Robinson	Slavery in the Structure of American Politics, 1765–1820	
1972	David Loye	The Healing of a Nation	
1972	Naboth Mokgatle	The Autobiography of an Unknown South African	
1973	Pat Conroy	The Water Is Wide	
1973	Betty Fladeland	Men & Brothers	
1973	Lee Rainwater	Behind Ghetto Walls: Black Family Life in a Federal Slum	
1974	Louis Leo Snyder	The Dreyfus Case: A Documentary History	
1974	Charles Duguid	Doctor and the Aborigines	
1974	Michel Fabre	The Unfinished Quest of Richard Wright	
1974	Albie Sachs	Justice in South Africa	
1975	Eugene D. Genovese	Roll, Jordan, Roll: The World the Slaves Made	
1975	Leon Poliakov	The Aryan Myth: A History of Racist and Nationalistic Ideas In Europe	
1976	Lucy S. Dawidowicz	The War Against the Jews: 1933–1945	
1976	Thomas Kiernan	The Arabs: Their History, Aims, and Challenge to the Industrialized World	
1976	Raphael Patai and Jennifer P. Wing	The Myth of the Jewish Race	
1977	Richard Kluger	Simple Justice: A History of Brown v. Board of Education & Black America's Struggle for Equality	
1977	Michi Weglyn	Years of Infamy: The Untold Story of America's Concentration Camps	
1978	Maxine Hong Kingston	The Woman Warrior: Memoirs Of A Girlhood Among Ghosts	
1978	Allan Chase	The Legacy of Malthus: The Social Costs of the New Scientific Racism	
1979	Phillip V. Tobias	The Bushmen: San Hunters and Herders of Southern Africa	
1980	Richard Borshay Lee	The !Kung San: Men, Women and Work in a Foraging Society	
1980	Urie Bronfenbrenner	The Ecology of Human Development: Experiments by Nature and Design	
1981	Carol Beckwith and Tepilit Ole Saitoti	Maasai	
1981	Jamake Highwater	Song from the Earth: American Indian painting	
1982	Geoffrey G. Field	Evangelist of Race: The Germanic Vision of Houston Stewart Chamberlain	
1982	Peter J. Powell	People of the Sacred Mountain	
1983	Richard Rodriguez	Hunger of Memory: The Education of Richard Rodriguez	
1983	Wole Soyinka	Aké: The Years of Childhood	
1984	Jose Alcina Franch	Pre-Columbian Art	
1984	Humbert S. Nelli	From Immigrants to Ethnics: The Italian Americans	
1985	David S. Wyman	The Abandonment of the Jews: America and the Holocaust 1941–1945	
1986	Donald Alexander Downs	Nazis in Skokie: Freedom, Community and the First Amendment	
1986	James North	Freedom Rising	
1986	Barton Wright and Clifford Bahnimptewa	Kachinas: A Hopi Artist's Documentary	
1987	Arnold Rampersad	The Life of Langston Hughes	
1987	Gail Sheehy	Spirit of Survival	
1988	Jeffrey Jay Foxx and Walter F. Morris Jr.	Living Maya	
1988	Abigail M. Thernstrom	Whose Votes Count?: Affirmative Action and Minority Voting Rights	
1989	Henry Louis Gates Jr.	The Schomburg Library of Nineteenth-Century Black Women Writers	
1989	Taylor Branch	Parting the Waters: America in the King Years	
1989	George Lipsitz	A Life In The Struggle: Ivory Perry and the Culture of Opposition	
1989	Peter Sutton	Dreamings: The Art of Aboriginal Australia	
1990	Hugh Honour	The Image of the Black in Western Art: Part 1	
1991	Walter A. Jackson	Gunnar Myrdal and America's Conscience: Social Engineering and Racial Liberalism, 1938–1987	
1991	Forrest G. Wood	The Arrogance Of Faith: Christianity and Race in America	
1991	Carol Beckwith, Angela Fisher, and Graham Hancock	African Ark: People and Ancient Cultures of Ethiopia and the Horn of Africa	
1992	Melissa Fay Greene	Praying for Sheetrock: A Work of Nonfiction	
1992	Peter Hayes	Lessons and Legacies I: The Meaning of the Holocaust in a Changing World	
1992	Elaine Mensh and Harry Mensh	The IQ Mythology: Class, Race, Gender, and Inequality	
1992	Marilyn Nelson	The Homeplace	
1993	Kwame Anthony Appiah	In My Father's House: Africa in the Philosophy of Culture	
1993	Marija Alseikaite Gimbutas	The Civilization of the Goddess	
1994	David Levering Lewis	W. E. B. Du Bois: A Reader	
1994	Ronald Takaki	A Different Mirror: A History of Multicultural America	
1995	William H. Tucker	The Science and Politics of Racial Research	
1995	Brent Staples	Parallel Time: Growing Up in Black and White	
1996	Jonathan Kozol	Amazing Grace: The Lives of Children and the Conscience of a Nation	
1997	James McBride	The Color of Water: A Black Man's Tribute to His White Mother	
1998	Toi Derricotte	The Black Notebooks: An Interior Journey	
1999	John Lewis and Michael D'Orso	Walking with the Wind: A Memoir of the Movement (about the American Civil Rights Movement)	
2000	Edward W. Said	Out of Place: A Memoir	
2001	David Levering Lewis	W. E. B. Du Bois: The Fight for Equality and the American Century, 1919–1963	
2001	F. X. Toole	Rope Burns: Stories from the Corner	
2002	Vernon E. Jordan Jr. and Annette Gordon-Reed	Vernon Can Read!: A Memoir	
2002	Quincy Jones	Q: The Autobiography of Quincy Jones	
2003	Samantha Power	A Problem from Hell: America and the Age of Genocide	
2004	Adrian Nicole LeBlanc	Random Family: Love, Drugs, Trouble, and Coming of Age in the Bronx	
2004	Ira Berlin	Generations of Captivity: A History of African-American Slaves	
2005	A. Van Jordan	Macnolia: Poems	
2005	Geoffrey C. Ward	Unforgivable Blackness: The Rise and Fall of Jack Johnson	
2006	Jill Lepore	New York Burning: Liberty, Slavery, and Conspiracy in Eighteenth-Century Manhattan	
2007	Scott Reynolds Nelson	Steel Drivin' Man: John Henry: The Untold Story of an American Legend	
2008	Ayaan Hirsi Ali	Infidel: My Life (Note: Because of the death threats against her, the award was not listed in advance, but was a surprise announcement at the ceremony.)	
2009	Annette Gordon-Reed	The Hemingses of Monticello: An American Family	
2011	David Eltis and David Richardson	Atlas of the Transatlantic Slave Trade	
2011	Isabel Wilkerson	The Warmth of Other Suns: The Epic Story of America's Great Migration	
2012	David Livingstone Smith	Less Than Human: Why We Demean, Enslave, and Exterminate Others	
2012	David Blight	American Oracle: The Civil War in the Civil Rights Era	
2013	Andrew Solomon	Far from the Tree: Parents, Children, and the Search for Identity	
2014	Ari Shavit	My Promised Land: The Triumph and Tragedy of Israel	
2015	Richard S. Dunn	A Tale of Two Plantations: Slave Life and Labor in Virginia and Jamaica	
2016	Lillian Faderman	The Gay Revolution: The Story of the Struggle	
2016	Brian Seibert	What the Eye Hears: A History of Tap Dancing	
2017	Margot Lee Shetterly	Hidden Figures: The American Dream and the Untold Story of the Black Women Who Helped Win the Space Race	
2018	Kevin Young	Bunk: The Rise of Hoaxes, Humbug, Plagiarists, Phonies, Post-Facts, and Fake News	
2019	Andrew Delbanco	The War Before the War: Fugitive Slaves and the Struggle for America's Soul from the Revolution to the Civil War	
2020	Charles King	Gods of the Upper Air: How a Circle of Renegade Anthropologists Reinvented Race, Sex, and Gender in the Twentieth Century	
2021	Vincent Brown	Tacky’s Revolt: The Story of an Atlantic Slave War	
2021	Natasha Trethewey	Memorial Drive: A Daughter's Memoir	
2022	Tiya Miles	All That She Carried: The Journey of Ashley's Sack, a Black Family Keepsake	
2022	George Makari	Of Fear and Strangers: A History of Xenophobia	
2023	Matthew F. Delmont	Half American: The Epic Story of African Americans Fighting World War II at Home and Abroad	
2024	Ned Blackhawk	The Rediscovery of America: Native Peoples and the Unmaking of U.S. History	
2025	Jonathan D. S. Schroeder	The United States Governed By Six Hundred Thousand Despots: A True Story of Slavery	
2026	Bench Ansfield	Born in Flames: The Business of Arson and the Remaking of the American City	

=== Lifetime achievement ===
Lifetime achievement recipients
Year	Recipient	Ref.
1996	Dorothy West	
1997	Albert L. Murray	
1998	Gordon Parks	
1999	John Hope Franklin	
2000	Ernest Gaines	
2001	Lucille Clifton	
2002	Jay Wright	
2003	Adrienne Kennedy	
2004	Derek Walcott	
2005	August Wilson	
2006	William Demby	
2007	Taylor Branch	
2008	William Melvin Kelley	
2009	Paule Marshall	
2010	Elizabeth Alexander	
2010	William Julius Wilson	
2010	Oprah Winfrey	
2011	John Edgar Wideman	
2012	Wole Soyinka	
2012	Arnold Rampersad	
2013	Wole Soyinka	
2014	Sir Wilson Harris	
2014	George Lamming	
2015	David Brion Davis	
2016	Orlando Patterson	
2017	Isabel Allende	
2018	N. Scott Momaday	
2019	Sonia Sanchez	
2020	Eric Foner	
2021	Samuel R. Delany	
2022	Ishmael Reed	
2023	Charlayne Hunter-Gault	
2024	Maxine Hong Kingston	
2025	Yusef Komunyakaa	

=== Special Achievement Award ===
- 1992 – Ralph Ellison for Invisible Man
