= James G. Leyburn =

American author (1902–1993)

- Born: January 17, 1902; Hedgesville, West Virginia, U.S.
- Died: April 28, 1993 (aged 91); Hagerstown, Maryland, U.S.
- Education: Duke University, Princeton University, Yale University
- Occupation(s): Sociologist, researcher, professor, academic administrator, author
- Known for: Sociology, ethnography

James Graham Leyburn (January 17, 1902 – April 28, 1993), was an American sociologist, professor, academic administrator, and author. He was a George Washington Professor Emeritus of Sociology at the Washington and Lee University in Lexington, Virginia, where he worked from 1947 until 1972. Leyburn wrote ethnographic books, most notably about Haitian history and culture.

== Early life and education ==
James Graham Leyburn was born in Hedgesville, West Virginia. His father was a minister at the First Presbyterian Church in Durham, North Carolina. He was a graduate of Trinity College (now Trinity College of Arts and Sciences) at Duke University, Princeton University, and Yale University.

== Career ==
In his early career, Leyburn held teaching positions at Hollins College (now Hollins University), Princeton University, and Yale University. He was a professor of sociology from 1947 to 1972 at University at Washington and Lee University in Lexington, Virginia; where he also served as dean from 1947 to 1956. Leyburn had also chaired the sociology and anthropology department from 1947 until 1967 at Washington and Lee University.

Leyburn wrote about the Haitians and the Scotch-Irish. He published several books, including a memoir titled The Way We Lived: Durham, 1900–1920 (1989). He received an Anisfield-Wolf Book Award in 1942 for his book on the Haitian people.

== Death and legacy ==
He died at the age of 91 of pneumonia in April 1993 in a hospital in Hagerstown, Maryland.

The main library at Washington and Lee University is named for him, and a 2004 portrait hangs in its lobby, by artist Steven Polson. Washington and Lee University has a collection of his papers.

== Publications ==
- Leyburn, James Graham (1931). Handbook of Ethnography. Yale University Press. ISBN 978-0-598-93220-4.
- Leyburn, James Graham (1935). Frontier Folkways. Yale University Press. ISBN 978-0-598-61100-0.
- Leyburn, James Graham (1941). The Haitian People. Yale University Press.
- Leyburn, James Graham (1944). Pierson College, the First Decade, 1933-1943. Overbrook Press.
- Leyburn, James Graham (1947). World Minority Problems. Public Affairs Committee.
- Leyburn, James G. (1962). The Scotch-Irish: A Social History. University of North Carolina Press. ISBN 978-0-8078-4259-1. JSTOR 10.5149/9780807888919_leyburn.
- Leyburn, James G. (1989). The Way We Lived: Durham, 1900–1920. Elliston, VA: Northcross House.
