= Francis Parkman Prize =

Award

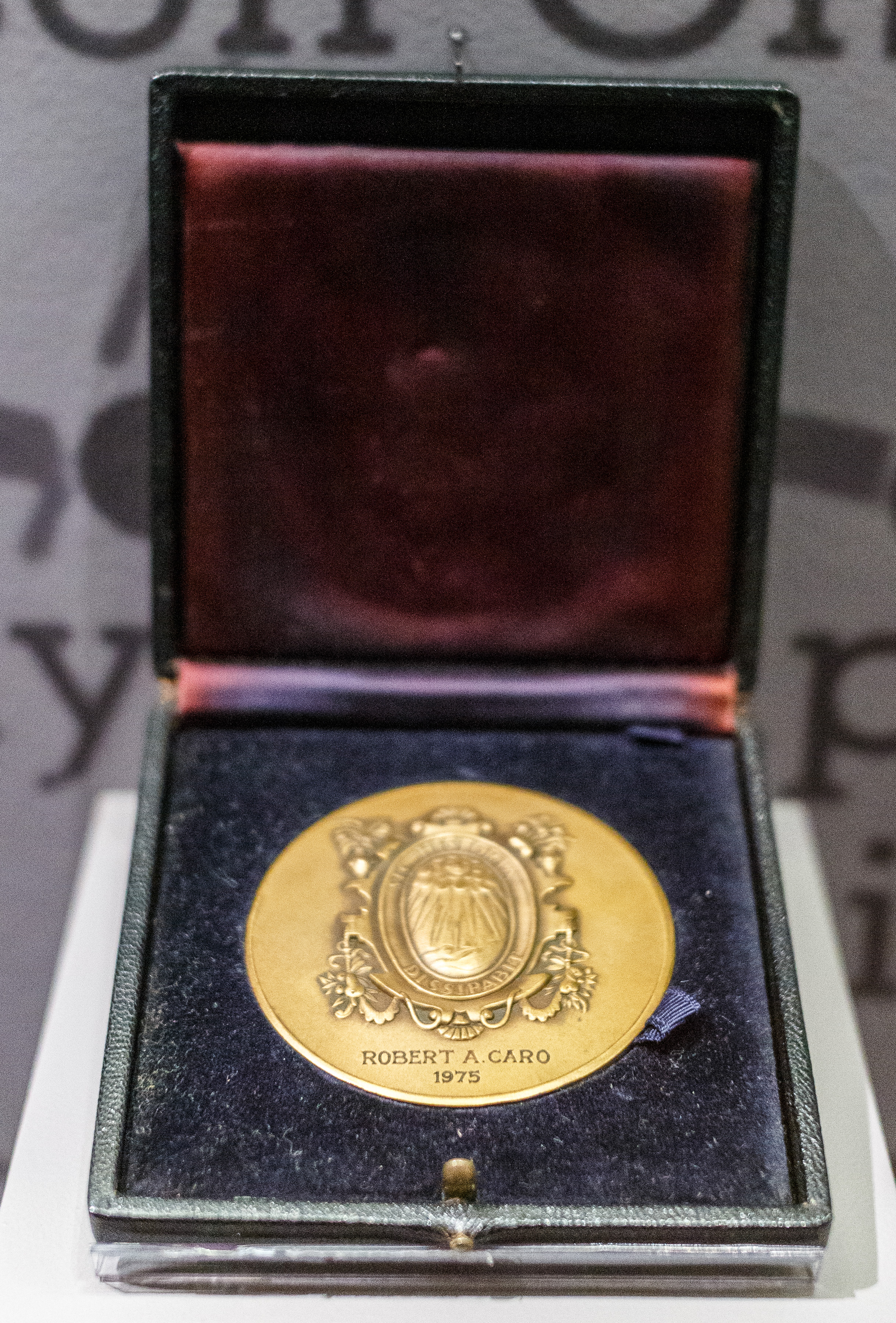
Robert Caro was awarded the Parkman Prize in 1975

The Francis Parkman Prize, named after Francis Parkman, is awarded by the Society of American Historians for the best book in American history each year. Its purpose is to promote literary distinction in historical writing. The Society of American Historians is an affiliate of the American Historical Association.

== Eligibility ==
The Parkman Prize is offered annually to a non-fiction book, including biography, that is distinguished by its literary merit and makes an important contribution to the history of what is now the United States. The author need not be a citizen or resident of the United States, and the book need not be published in the United States. Textbooks, edited collections, bibliographies, reference works, and juvenile books are ineligible. The book's copyright must be in the previous year.

== The prize ==
In 2026 the prize consisted of a certificate and $2,000. A certificate is also presented to the publisher. The prize is awarded at the society's annual meeting in May.

The first prize in 1957, won by George F. Kennan for his Russia Leaves the War, carried an award of $500.

== Winners ==
- 1957 – George F. Kennan for Russia Leaves the War
- 1958 – Arthur M. Schlesinger, Jr. for The Crisis of the Old Order
- 1959 – Ernest Samuels for Henry Adams: The Middle Years
- 1960 – Matthew Josephson for Edison: A Biography
- 1961 – Elting E. Morison for Turmoil and Tradition: A Study of the Life and Times of Henry L. Stimson
- 1962 – Leon Wolff for Little Brown Brother: How the United States Purchased and Pacified the Philippine Islands at the Century's Turn
- 1963 – James Thomas Flexner for That Wilder Image: The Painting of America's Native School from Thomas Cole to Winslow Homer
- 1964 – William Leuchtenburg for Franklin D. Roosevelt and the New Deal
- 1965 – Willie Lee Nichols Rose for Rehearsal for Reconstruction: The Port Royal Experiment
- 1966 – Daniel J. Boorstin for The Americans: The National Experience
- 1967 – William H. Goetzmann for Exploration and Empire: The Explorer and the Scientist in the Winning of the American West
- 1969 – Winthrop Jordan for White Over Black: American Attitudes Toward the Negro, 1550-1812
- 1970 – Theodore A. Wilson for The First Summit: Roosevelt and Churchill at Placentia Bay, 1941
- 1971 – James MacGregor Burns for Roosevelt: The Soldier of Freedom, 1940-1945
- 1972 – Joseph P. Lash for Eleanor and Franklin: The Story of Their Relationship, based on Eleanor Roosevelt's Private Papers
- 1973 – Kenneth S. Davis for FDR: The Beckoning of Destiny, 1882-1928
- 1974 – Robert W. Johannsen for Stephen A. Douglas
- 1975 – Robert A. Caro for The Power Broker: Robert Moses and the Fall of New York
- 1976 – Edmund S. Morgan for American Slavery, American Freedom
- 1977 – Irving Howe for World of Our Fathers
- 1978 – David McCullough for The Path Between the Seas: The Creation of the Panama Canal, 1870-1914
- 1979 – R. David Edmunds for The Potawatomis: Keepers of the Fire
- 1980 – Leon F. Litwack for Been in the Storm So Long: The Aftermath of Slavery
- 1981 – Charles Royster for A Revolutionary People at War: The Continental Army and American Character, 1775-1783
- 1982 – William S. McFeely for Grant: A Biography
- 1983 – John R. Stilgoe for Common Landscape of America, 1580-1845
- 1984 – William Cronon for Changes in the Land, Revised Edition: Indians, Colonists, and the Ecology of New England
- 1985 – Joel Williamson for The Crucible of Race: Black-White Relations in the American South since Emancipation
- 1986 – Kenneth T. Jackson for Crabgrass Frontier: The Suburbanization of the United States
- 1987 – Michael G. Kammen for A Machine That Would Go of Itself: The Constitution in American Culture
- 1988 – Eric Larrabee for Commander in Chief: Franklin Delano Roosevelt, His Lieutenants, and Their War
- 1989 – Eric Foner for Reconstruction: America's Unfinished Revolution, 1863-1877
- 1990 – Geoffrey C. Ward for A First-Class Temperament: The Emergence of Franklin Roosevelt
- 1991 – Paul E. Hoffman for A New Andalucia and a Way to the Orient: The American Southeast During the Sixteenth Century
- 1992 – Richard White for The Middle Ground: Indians, Empires, and Republics in the Great Lakes Region, 1650-1815
- 1993 – David McCullough for Truman
- 1994 – David Levering Lewis for W. E. B. Du Bois: Biography of a Race, 1868-1919
- 1995 – John Putnam Demos for The Unredeemed Captive: A Family Story from Early America
- 1996 – Robert D. Richardson, Jr. for Emerson: The Mind on Fire
- 1997 – Drew Gilpin Faust for Mothers of Invention: Women of the Slaveholding South in the American Civil War
- 1998 – John M. Barry for Rising Tide: The Great Mississippi Flood of 1927 and How It Changed America
- 1999 – Elliott West for The Contested Plains: Indians, Goldseekers, & the Rush to Colorado
- 2000 – David M. Kennedy for Freedom from Fear: The American People in Depression and War, 1929–1945
- 2001 – Fred Anderson for Crucible of War: The Seven Years' War and the Fate of Empire in British North America, 1754-1766
- 2002 – Louis Menand for The Metaphysical Club: A Story of Ideas in America
- 2003 – James F. Brooks for Captives and Cousins: Slavery, Kinship, and Community in the Southwest Borderlands
- 2004 – Suzanne Lebsock for A Murder in Virginia: Southern Justice on Trial
- 2005 – Alan Trachtenberg for Shades of Hiawatha: Staging Indians, Making Americans, 1880-1930
- 2006 – Megan Marshall for The Peabody Sisters: Three Women Who Ignited American Romanticism
- 2007 – John H. Elliott for Empires of the Atlantic World: Britain and Spain in America 1492-1830
- 2008 – Jean Edward Smith for FDR
- 2009 – Jared Farmer for On Zion's Mount: Mormons, Indians, and the American Landscape
- 2010 – Blake Bailey for Cheever: A Life
- 2011 – Jefferson Cowie for Stayin' Alive: The 1970s and the Last Days of the Working Class
- 2012 – Richard White for Railroaded: The Transcontinentals and the Making of Modern America
- 2013 – Fredrik Logevall for Embers of War: The Fall of an Empire and the Making of America's Vietnam
- 2014 – Philip Shenon for A Cruel and Shocking Act: The Secret History of the Kennedy Assassination
- 2015 – Danielle Allen for Our Declaration: A Reading of the Declaration of Independence in Defense of Equality
- 2016 – Christine Leigh Heyrman for American Apostles: When Evangelicals Entered the World of Islam
- 2017 – Joe Jackson for Black Elk: The Life of an American Visionary
- 2018 – Christina Snyder for Great Crossings: Indians, Settlers & Slaves in the Age of Jackson
- 2019 – David W. Blight for Frederick Douglass: Prophet of Freedom
- 2020 – Charles King for Gods of the Upper Air: How a Circle of Renegade Anthropologists Reinvented Race, Sex, and Gender in the Twentieth Century
- 2021 – Christopher Tomlins for In the Matter of Nat Turner: A Speculative History
- 2022 – Nicole Eustace for Covered with Night: A Story of Murder and Indigenous Justice in Early America.
- 2023 – John Wood Sweet for The Sewing Girl’s Tale: A Story of Crime and Consequences in Revolutionary America.
- 2024 – David Waldstreicher for The Odyssey of Phillis Wheatley: A Poet’s Journeys through American Slavery and Independence.
- 2025 – Jon Grinspan for Wide Awake: The Forgotten Force That Elected Lincoln and Spurred the Civil War
- 2026 – Bench Ansfield for Born in Flames: The Business of Arson and the Remaking of the American City

== Francis Parkman Prize for Special Achievement ==
The Francis Parkman Prize for Special Achievement is periodically awarded for scholarly and professional distinction. Established in 1962, it has been awarded only five times.

=== Winners ===
- 1994 - Walter Lord
- 1988 - Forrest Pogue
- 1974 - Alfred A. Knopf
- 1970 - Samuel Eliot Morison
- 1962 - Allan Nevins

== See also ==
- List of history awards
