= Heyrman =

Heyrman is a surname. Notable people with the surname include:

- Christine Leigh Heyrman, American historian
- Hugo Heyrman (born 1942), Belgian artist
- Laura Heyrman (born 1993), Belgian volleyball player
