= Russia Leaves the War =

1956 book by George F. Kennan

- First edition
- Author: George F. Kennan
- Language: English
- Genre: Non-fiction
- Publisher: Princeton University Press
- Publication date: 1956
- Publication place: United States

Russia Leaves the War (1956) is a book by George F. Kennan, which won the 1957 Pulitzer Prize for History, the 1957 National Book Award for Nonfiction, the 1957 George Bancroft Prize, and the 1957 Francis Parkman Prize.

The first of two volumes discussing Soviet-American relations from 1917–1920, it covers the Russian Revolution of 1917 and the departure of Russia from World War I in 1918. The second volume, The Decision to Intervene (1958) explores U.S. involvement in Siberia.
