= Tremor (Cole novel) =

2023 novel by Nigerian-American author Teju Cole

- Author: Teju Cole
- Language: English
- Genre: Literary fiction
- Publisher: Random House
- Publication date: October 17, 2023
- Publication place: United States
- Media type: Print
- Pages: 256 pp.
- ISBN: 9780812997118 (hardcover 1st ed.)
- OCLC: 1351935359

Tremor is a 2023 novel by Nigerian-American author Teju Cole.

== Writing and conception ==
Cole wrote the novel partially to "capture the moment just before the pandemic."

== Reception ==
In a positive review, Julian Lucas of The New Yorker praised the novel, writing it was an "elegant and unsettling prose still-life." Brain Dillon of The New York Times describes is as a mix of Cole as a photographer and Cole as an essayist.

== Awards ==
In 2024, the novel won the Anisfield-Wolf Book Award for Fiction.

| Year | Award | Category | Result | Ref. |
|---|---|---|---|---|
| 2023 | National Book Critics Circle Award | Fiction | Finalist | |
| 2024 | Anisfield-Wolf Book Award | Fiction | Won | |
| 2024 | Joyce Carol Oates Literary Prize | — | Longlisted | |
| 2024 | Mark Twain American Voice in Literature Award | — | Longlisted | |
