= Open City (novel) =

2011 novel by Nigerian-American writer Teju Cole

- First edition
- Author: Teju Cole
- Genre: Novel
- Publisher: Random House
- Publication date: 2011

Open City is a 2011 novel by Nigerian-American writer Teju Cole. The novel is primarily set in New York City, and concerns a Nigerian immigrant, Julius, who has recently broken up with his girlfriend. The novel received praise for its prose and depiction of New York.

It was included on several end of year lists of the best books published in 2011.

== Plot ==
Julius, a man completing the last year of a psychiatry fellowship, wanders the streets of New York City, travels to Brussels, and meets a variety of people over the course of a year.

== Structure ==
The novel has no substantial plot, and instead relies on Julius' insights and "peregrinations" through New York City and the broader world to drive the book.

The book's structure and composition has been compared to the work of W.G. Sebald, and although Open City has "nominally separate" chapters, its lack of punctuation gives it the "atmosphere of a text written in a single, unbroken paragraph". The style has been compared to the structure of a diary.

== Reception ==
Michiko Kakutani, writing for The New York Times, compared the work to those of W.G. Sebald and said that Cole's failure to "dramatize his alienation ... underscored the ... ad hoc nature of the overall narrative.

In The New Yorker, James Wood praised Cole's inclusion of critical theory as neither a satirical undermining of the academic field or a "[flourish] to exhibit the author's credentials".

The novel was a finalist for the National Book Critics Circle Award for Fiction.
