= Monica Youn =

American poet and lawyer

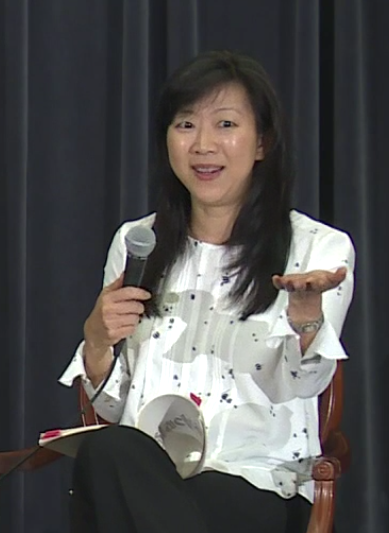
- Youn, speaking in 2016
- Born: Monica Youngna Youn; 1971 (age 54–55); United States
- Education: Princeton University, Yale Law School, Oxford University
- Writing career
- Genre: Poetry
- Notable awards: Witter Bynner Fellowship

Monica Youngna Youn is an American poet and lawyer.

== Life ==
Youn was raised in Houston, Texas. She graduated from St. Agnes Academy (Texas), Princeton University, Yale Law School with a J.D., and Oxford University with a M.Phil., where she was a Rhodes Scholar.

=== Literary career ===
Youn is the author of four poetry collections: Barter (2003), Ignatz (2010), Blackacre (2016), and From From (2023). Ignatz was a finalist for the 2010 National Book Award for Poetry; Blackacre won the Poetry Society of America's William Carlos Williams Award, was longlisted for the 2016 National Book Award for Poetry, shortlisted for the National Book Critics Circle Award for Poetry, and was one of The New York Times Book Review's Best Poetry Collections of 2016; and From From was a finalist for the 2023 National Book Award for Poetry, one of The New York Times Book Review's Best Poetry Collections of 2023, and was recognized as amongst the best books of the year by Time, NPR, Publishers Weekly, and more.

Her poems have appeared in The New Yorker, Poetry Magazine, The Paris Review, among other journals. She has given readings at the Museum of Modern Art (MOMA), on NPR's All Things Considered and was a keynote reader at the 2012 Association of Writers & Writing Programs Conference.

Monica Youn credits a book of Rilke poems that she read as a high schooler with being "the click" that first interested her in poetry. For her undergraduate studies at Princeton University, Youn considered majoring in creative writing, but her parents "absolutely refus[ed] to contribute one cent" to that pathway, drawing her, instead, to pre-law with creative writing as a minor. After graduating and receiving a Rhodes Scholarship, Youn pursued a graduate degree in English literature at Oxford, where she first began publishing her poems in literary magazines; after earning her M.Phil in English, she enrolled in Yale law school. While at Yale, Youn received the Stegner Fellowship in Creative Writing and completed the manuscript for her first collection, Barter. After graduating in 1998, Youn spent the next fourteen years as a lawyer - nine years in private practice and five years as a public-interest lawyer - which she described as "workable, but grueling," and continued to write poetry "on the side"; during this period, she published Ignatz. Youn later began lecturing at Princeton University, publishing Blackacre during this period. She currently teaches creative writing at the University of California, Irvine.

=== Legal career ===
She was the inaugural Brennan Center Constitutional Fellow at New York University Law School. She formerly directed the campaign finance reform project at the Brennan Center for Justice. She is a member of the bar of the Supreme Court of the United States and was co-lead counsel for Defendant-Intervenors in McComish v. Bennett in 2011. She has appeared on PBS Newshour, Hardball with Chris Matthews, Bill Moyers Journal, and Need to Know. She is the editor of Money, Politics and the Constitution: Beyond Citizens United. She has testified before the Senate Judiciary Committee, the House Judiciary Committee, and the House Committee on Administration.

She was a pledged delegate for Obama in the 2008 presidential election. She has written for Slate, The Los Angeles Times, and The Huffington Post.

== Awards ==
- Stegner Fellowship at Stanford University
- Yaddo residency
- MacDowell Fellow
- 2008 Witter Bynner Fellowship
- Rockefeller Foundation / Bellagio—Villa Serbelloni,
- National Book Award Finalist 2010
- National Book Award Longlist 2016
- William Carlos Williams Award 2017
- National Book Critics Circle Award finalist 2017
- PEN Open Book Award Finalist 2017
- Guggenheim Fellowship, John Simon Guggenheim Memorial Foundation, New York City, 2018
- Levinson Prize, Poetry Foundation 2019
- National Book Award Finalist 2023
- Anisfield-Wolf Book Award 2024

== Bibliography ==
=== Poetry ===
==== Collections ====
- Youn, Monica (2003). Barter. Saint Paul, MN.: Graywolf Press. ISBN 9781555973810.
- Youn, Monica (2010). Ignatz. Four Way Books. ISBN 9781935536017.
- Youn, Monica (2016). Blackacre. Saint Paul, MN.: Graywolf Press. ISBN 9781555977504.
- Youn, Monica (2023). From From (paperback 1st ed.). Minneapolis: Graywolf Press. ISBN 9781644452219.

==== Poems in anthologies ====
- Youn, Monica (2004). "25th & Delores". In Victoria Chang (ed.). Asian American Poetry: The Next Generation (paperback 1st ed.). Urbana, IL: University of Illinois Press. ISBN 9780252071744.
- Youn, Monica (2006). "Nagflar; Night Ferry to Naxos; Flatlanders". In Michael Dumanis; Cate Marvin (eds.). Legitimate Dangers (paperback 1st ed.). Louisville, KY: Sarabande Books. ISBN 9781932511291.
- Youn, Monica (2008). "Stereoscope". In Tina Chang; Nathalie Handal; Ravi Shankar (eds.). Language for a New Century: Contemporary Poetry from the Middle East, Asia, and Beyond. W. W. Norton & Company. ISBN 9780393332384.
- Youn, Monica (2012). "Stealing The Scream". In Emily Fragos (ed.). Art and Artists: Poems (hardcover 1st ed.). New York: Everyman's Library. ISBN 9780307959386.

=== Non-fiction ===
==== Literary criticism ====
- "Of Poetry and Power: Reflections on the Inauguration", Poetry Foundation

==== Law ====
- Money, Politics, and the Constitution: Beyond Citizens United. Century Foundation Press. 2011. ISBN 9780870785214.
- "First Amendment Fault Lines and the Citizens United Decision". Harvard Law and Policy Review. February 2011. SSRN 1762746.
- "The Roberts Courts' Free Speech Double Standard". American Constitution Society. November 2011.
- "The Chilling Effect and the Problem of Private Action". Vanderbilt Law Review. October 2013.
- "Proposition 8 and the Mormon Church: A Case Study in Donor Disclosure". George Washington Law Review. December 2013.
