= Every Day Is for the Thief =

2007 novel by Teju Cole

- Author: Teju Cole
- Language: English
- Genre: Fiction
- Publication date: 2007
- Publication place: Nigeria

Every Day Is for the Thief is a 2007 novel by Nigerian-American author Teju Cole. The unnamed protagonist of the novel returns to Lagos after fifteen years in New York City, only to find himself changed by living abroad and confused by the city. The novel was first published in Nigeria, but was later republished in the United States.

== Plot summary ==
A man leaves New York to return to Lagos for the first time in 15 years after the death of his father and a fight with his mother. He realizes he is not as comfortable in his home country as he expected to be.
