= A Different Mirror =

1993 book by Ronald Takaki

- Book cover, first edition
- Author: Ronald Takaki
- Language: English
- Publisher: Back Bay Books
- Publication date: 20 December 1993
- ISBN: 978-0316831116

A Different Mirror: A History of Multicultural America is a book by Ronald Takaki. It received an Anisfield-Wolf Book Award and an American Book Award in 1994.

== Overview ==
A Different Mirror deals with the subject of minority perspectives of multicultural America, incorporating quotes, folk songs, letters, telegrams, and photographs into the text. It deals with, in roughly sequential order, Native Americans, African Americans pre- and post-slavery era, Irish, Mexicans, Chicanos, Chinese, Japanese, Jews, and ties up the book with a current (for the time the book was written) summary of where minorities are now. Each chapter talks about the history of a different ethnic group, and covers over a period of time public attitudes towards the minority, public policy, laws for or against the minority, and attitude of the minority towards their situation. Several groups are revisited at multiple points through their history.

One common theme throughout the entire book is the 'us against them' attitude that the ruling structure has towards the minorities, from the fear of the "giddy multitude" in colonial times, to the Chinese Exclusion Act being created to 'protect' white labor, to the modern day accusations that "Hispanics [...] tak[e] jobs away from 'Americans'"

A related theme of the book is the pattern of capitalist owners pitting different immigrant groups against one another, as a strike-breaking tactic. For example, the book relates that the Order of the Knights of St. Crispin was unsuccessful in persuading Chinese workers to join the 1878 Chicago shoemakers' strike, when the latter were recruited as strikebreakers by shoe factory owners.

== See also ==
- Timeline of labor issues and events
- Multiculturalism
- Race and ethnicity in the United States
