= Walter F. Morris Jr. =

American anthropologist and preservationist (1952–2019)

Walter Francis Morris Jr. (September 8, 1952 - October 15, 2019) was an American cultural anthropologist and preservationist.

== Early life and education ==
Walter Francis Morris, better known as Chip Morris, was born in Boston, Massachusetts, on September 8, 1952. He grew up in the Boston area and then was an AFS High School Foreign exchange student to Thailand 1969-70.

After graduating from high school, Morris visited Chiapas, Mexico, in early 1972 and after a short return to the United States moved to San Cristobal de las Casas permanently and lived there until the end of his life.

== Maya culture ==
In 1973, he lived with a Maya family in San Andrés Larráinzar for a year, learning Maya culture and the Tzotzil language. He became interested in Maya astronomy, textiles, weaving techniques and symbols used in Maya textile designs. He spent the rest of his life studying these subjects and became one of the leading experts in Maya culture and textiles.

Morris was coordinator of Mexican initiatives the NGO Aid to Artisans, based in Hartford, Connecticut. He was a member of the board of the Pellizzi Collection of Textiles of Chiapas. He was a research associate at the Science Museum of Minnesota, and program coordinator for lead-free pottery of the United States Agency for International Development.

== Death ==
He died October 15, 2015 in San Cristobal de las Casas. He is buried in the main cemetery of San Cristobal de las Casas in Chiapas, Mexico.

== Awards ==
- 1983 MacArthur Fellows Program
- 1988 Anisfield-Wolf Book Award with Jeffrey Jay Foxx

== Works ==
- A Catalogue of the Textiles and Folk Art of Chiapas, Mexico, 1979
- The weaving and folk art of Chiapas, Mexico 1979
- A Millennium of Weaving in Chiapas (1984)
- Maya Time Warps, Archaeology 39 No. 3 1986
- Handmade Money: Latin American Artisans in the Marketplace, 1989
- Living Maya, 1987
- A Textile Guide to The Highlands of Chiapas, 2011
- Maya Threads: A Woven History of Chiapas, 2015
