= From From =

2023 poetry collection by Monica Youn

From From: Poems
- Author: Monica Youn
- Publisher: Graywolf Press
- Publication date: March 7, 2023
- Pages: 136
- Awards: Anisfield-Wolf Book Award
- ISBN: 978-1644452219
- Preceded by: Blackacre

From From is a 2024 poetry collection by Monica Youn, published by Graywolf Press. The book's poems tackle issues of racism faced by Asian Americans and other communities in the United States. Youn's fourth collection, it was nominated for the 2023 National Book Award for Poetry and won the 2024 Anisfield-Wolf Book Award.

== Content and background ==
A book primarily contending with racism, many of its poems tackle events such as the killing of Latasha Harlins, anti-blackness in Korean American communities, the 2021 Atlanta spa shootings, racism against Asian Americans during the COVID-19 pandemic, and others. Youn's poems also involve Greek mythology and Korean symbolism.

With regard to the book's "departure" from her earlier work, Youn stated in BOMB Magazine: "I always felt I had permission to talk about race, but I wanted to figure out a way to write about race that would ring true to me." Youn then shared that one motivating factor for the book's writing was "a panel of fantastic young Korean American female poets at the AWP conference in Los Angeles" who shared stories about acquiring funding to return to Korea and write about racial identity. The panel made Youn realize that she didn't want to write about identity and authenticity but rather "deracination—more a poetics of difference".

== Critical reception ==
In a starred review, Publishers Weekly stated: "Intimate yet expansive, Youn’s poems bring remarkable depth, candor, and intensity to personal and social history." Also in a starred review, Library Journal said "Youn does an extraordinary job of blending historical themes with haunting modern-day experiences to clarify sense of self. Readers will be captivated."

Some critics observed Youn's tackling of race issues in the United States to an extent unseen in her previous work. The New York Times concluded that "In reflecting and refracting the fantasies and absurdities, dark secrets and blatant cruelties by which American racism invents and maintains itself, Youn counters our brutal imagination with flammable, superior dreams." Jee Leong Koh, writing for Poetry School, said that "From From, Monica Youn’s fourth book of poems, is a striking departure from her first three books. Instead of addressing race obliquely and occasionally, From From confronts it full-on, from beginning to end." The Asian Review of Books concluded that "Weaving history, myths, literature, films, historical accounts with personal encounters, Youn takes away the many guises of racism, whether tragic or comic, as the poet traces through history and modern life the origins of such anxieties".

Other critics lauded Youn's tone and candor, seeing them as assets to her project of interrogating race. The Harvard Review stated that "Youn’s unsettlingly patient tone acts as the ultimate condemnation: she exposes the delusions of racist reasoning simply by laying them bare." The Hopkins Review called her poems "Humorous, curious, essayistic; these poems will last in the memories of readers for years to come and will continue to instruct readers on the way to interrogate their own prejudices and desires."

A few critics analyzed Youn's style. The London Review of Books observed the book as "her first to rely primarily on long prose poems, or lyric essays, advancing sparely perspicuous, caustically disillusioned arguments about myth and history, cravings and reactions, racial distinction and white supremacy." Similarly, Victoria Chang for The Los Angeles Review of Books argued that "True, this is a book of poetry, but arguably, as we’ve said, this is a hybrid book of poetry and lyric essays ... In the end, a new kind of unconventional and surprising body of work emerges, a new way to talk about race that I don’t think has been done before." The Times Literary Supplement compared Youn's "stark, self-aware poem-essays" to the work of Claudia Rankine.

The book made several lists. It was one of The New York Times' notable books of 2023. It appeared on NPR's Books We Love segment. Time included it on their list of 100 must-reads for 2023. Electric Literature, Publishers Weekly, and Library Journal called it one of the best poetry collections of 2023.
