= Alwin C. Ernst =

American businessman (1881–1948)

- Born: Alwin Charles Ernst; July 26, 1881; Cleveland, Ohio, US
- Died: May 13, 1948 (aged 66); Cleveland, Ohio, US
- Education: Business college
- Occupations: Accountant, racehorse owner and breeder
- Known for: Co-founder, Ernst & Ernst
- Children: 4 daughters

Alwin C. Ernst, also known as Alvin C. Ernst and A. C. Ernst (CPA) (July 26, 1881 – May 13, 1948), was an American businessman who co-founded the accounting firm of Ernst & Ernst, in 1903, and who is credited with devising management consulting.

== Biography ==
Alwin Charles Ernst was born July 26, 1881, to John C. and Mary (Hertel) Ernst, in Cleveland, Ohio. He had, among his siblings, an older brother, Theodore C. Ernst (September 23, 1869 – 3 October 1946). After finishing high school, Ernst took evening courses at a business college.

== Career ==
In 1900, he and his older brother, Theodore, began working as bookkeepers at The Audit Co. in Cleveland. In 1903, the brothers founded the Ernst & Ernst bookkeeping service with an invested capital of $500.

Ernst created the firm's "Special Services Department" in 1908, noted as "the predecessor of current management-consulting services." He is credited with pioneering the concept of using financial accounting data to inform business decisions, as well as with creating management consulting.

Aggressive and ambitious, Ernst had already opened offices in Chicago by 1908 and in New York City by 1909. He obtained an Ohio Certified Public Accountant (CPA) certificate in 1910, and continued a rapid expansion, adding offices in Cincinnati in 1911, and in St. Louis in 1913, growing the firm's locations to 16 offices by 1919, then 26 offices by 1929.

Ernst advertised and solicited new clients, in violation of Ohio state board rules; along with two of his partners, he resigned from the American Institute of CPAs (AICPA) when it acted against the firm for its brand of advertising. Ernst never rejoined the AICPA.

In April 1913, Governor James M. Cox appointed Ernst secretary of the Red Cross Ohio Flood Relief Commission, following the Great Flood of 1913 in Southern Ohio.

== Thoroughbred racing ==
Ernst owned and bred thoroughbred racehorses, primarily those that ran in sprint races. Among his best horses was multiple stakes winner Alorter whose wins included the 1943 Cowdin Stakes. Ernst also bred Algasir, dying prior the horse winning the 1948 Cowdin Stakes and the Flash Stakes, and setting a world record for four furlongs.

== Death and legacy ==
Ernst was buried at Knollwood Cemetery in Mayfield Heights, Ohio.

He was noted as "one of Cleveland's most charitable and philanthropic citizens."

After Ernst's death, his estate was inherited by his four daughters and, in August 1948, they sold most of his racing stable through an auction at Saratoga Race Course. There, Algasir was purchased by F. Ambrose Clark for US$106,000.
