= Dwight L. Dumond =

American academic and author (1895–1976)

Dwight Lowell Dumond (August 27, 1895 – May 30, 1976) was an American writer known for his distinguished works on slavery. He served as professor emeritus of American history at the University of Michigan.

Dumond was born in Kingston, Ohio on August 27, 1895. He completed his undergraduate studies at Baldwin Wallace University in 1920 and graduated from Washington University in St. Louis with a master's degree in 1925. In 1929 he completed a PhD at the University of Michigan. He taught history at Ohio Wesleyan University for one year before moving to the University of Michigan, where he taught from 1930 to 1965. After his retirement from Michigan he taught at Howard University and Colgate University. He won an Ainsfield-Wolf Book Award for his book Antislavery in 1961, and was awarded an honorary doctorate from Northern Michigan University in 1965. The University of Michigan has a collection of his papers.

He and Gilbert H. Barnes were credited by Merton L. Dillon with reappraising the causes of the American Civil War.

== Books ==
- The Secession Movement (1931)
- Letters of Theodore Dwight Weld, Angelina Grinke Weld and Sarah Grinke 1822–1844, Volumes I–II, co-edited with Gilbert H. Barnes (January 1, 1934)
- Roosevelt to Roosevelt (1937)
- Antislavery Origins of the Civil War in the United States (1939)
- A History of the United States (1942)
- America in Our Time (1947)
- Black Mother: the Years of the African Slave Trade (1961)
- Antislavery; Crusade for Freedom in America (1961)
- A Bibliography of Antislavery in America (1961)
- America's Shame and Redemption (1965)
