= The Gay Revolution: The Story of the Struggle =

2015 nonfiction book by Lillian Faderman

- Cover
- Author: Lillian Faderman
- Language: English
- Subject: LGBT history
- Publisher: Simon & Schuster
- Publication date: 2015
- Publication place: United States
- Media type: Print (Hardcover and Paperback)
- Pages: 816 pp.
- ISBN: 978-1451694116

The Gay Revolution: The Story of the Struggle is a 2015 book by Lillian Faderman chronicling the struggle for gay, lesbian, bisexual, and transgender rights in the United States from the 1950s to the early 21st century. It was called "the most comprehensive history to date of America's gay-rights movement" in a review by The Economist. It was named a Notable Book of the year by The New York Times and a Notable Nonfiction Book of the year by The Washington Post.

Reviews of The Gay Revolution have been overwhelmingly positive, and have appeared in The New York Times, The Washington Post, the Chicago Tribune, the Huffington Post, Slate, Kirkus Reviews, and Publishers Weekly. In a review for the Lambda Literary Foundation, Victoria A. Brownworth wrote, "It is, unquestionably, a landmark book and will likely be the template by which subsequent scholarship on our collective lesbian and gay history will be judged." It received the Anisfield-Wolf Book Award in 2016.
