= Knollwood Cemetery =

Cemetery in Mayfield Heights, Ohio

Knollwood Cemetery and Mausoleum
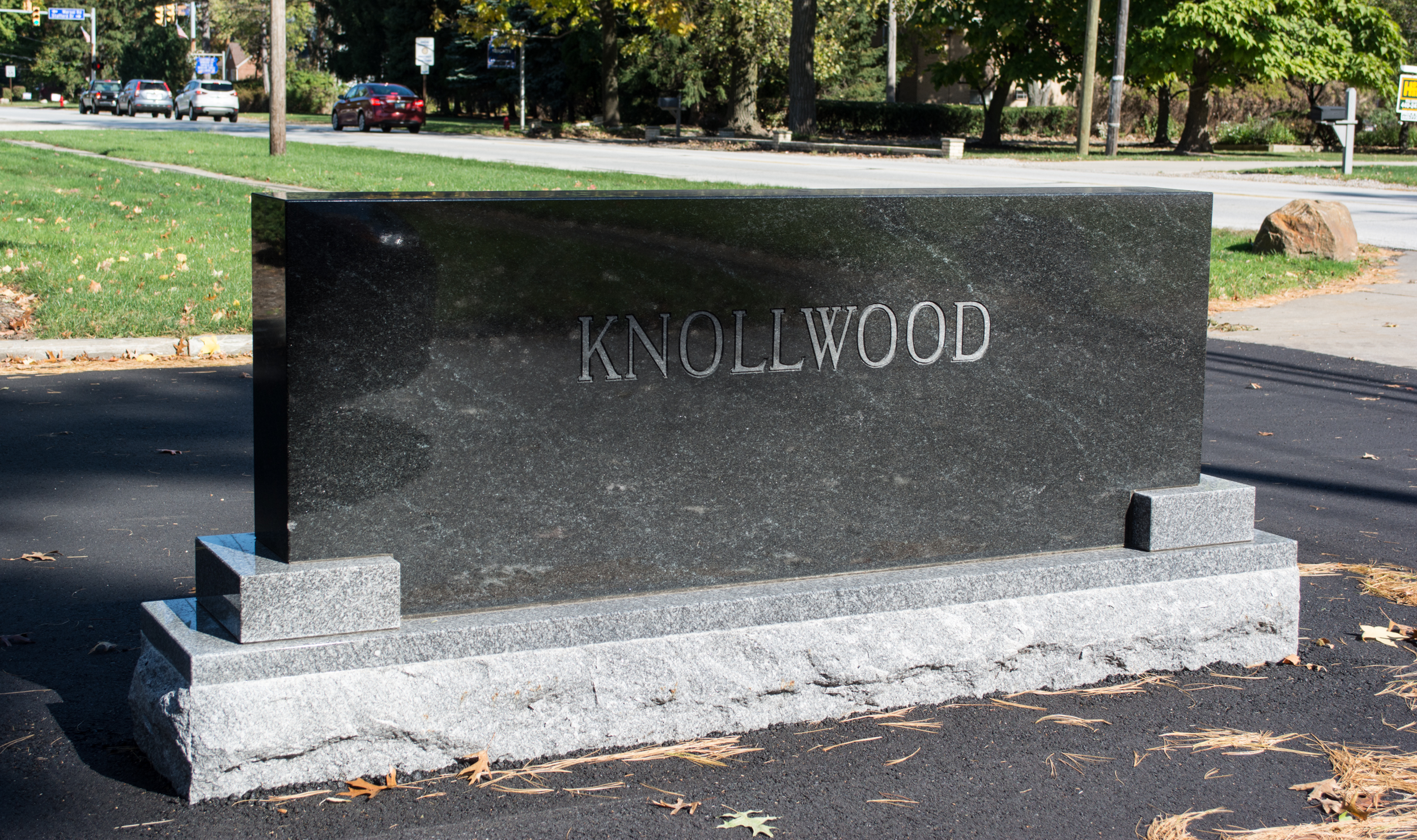
- Interactive map of Knollwood Cemetery and Mausoleum

Details
- Established: September 9, 1908
- Location: Mayfield Heights, Ohio
- Country: United States
- Coordinates: 41.512507°N 81.442796°W
- Type: Private
- Size: 96 acres (390,000 m^{2})
- No. of graves: More than 50,000 (2020)
- Website: knollwoodcemetery.net
- Find a Grave: Knollwood Cemetery and Mausoleum
- The Political Graveyard: Knollwood Cemetery and Mausoleum

Knollwood Cemetery is a cemetery located at 1678 SOM Center Road in Mayfield Heights, Ohio. Established in 1908, it is one of the largest cemeteries in Cuyahoga County. A mausoleum was completed in 1926, and an expansion finished in 1959. The cemetery's mausoleum, the largest in the state, boasts a number of windows by Tiffany & Co.

== Creating the cemetery ==
Knollwood Cemetery was incorporated on September 9, 1908, by C.F. Heinig, Francis P. Newcome, and H.L. Ebbert. A five-member board of directors was established, and Benjamin Ottman elected its first president. A few weeks after its incorporation, the cemetery purchased 200 acres (810,000 m^{2}) of land from the Pennington-Quilling Co. for $40,000 ($1,433,333 in 2025 dollars). The land had previously been the farm of Robert Lowe. In June 1909, the cemetery purchased another 10 acres (40,000 m^{2}) of land for $100 ($3,583 in 2025 dollars) from James Watters, and 22.6 acres (91,000 m^{2}) of land from J.W. Thorman for $100. Another 27.4 acres (111,000 m^{2}) were acquired from other sources.

Ground was broken on the new cemetery on June 26, 1909. Paul Heinze, an architect from Detroit, Michigan, who had designed several cemeteries in the Midwestern United States, laid out Knollwood as a "park" cemetery. Twenty work crews began preparing burial vaults, grading roads, and landscaping 170 acres (690,000 m^{2}) of the site in preparation for a July 15 dedication. (Note: It's clear from later reports that not all of the 170 acres (690,000 m^{2}) were immediately converted to burial space. Most of the work probably consisted of clearing brush, laying sod, and building roads.) Work included the creation of a man-made lake. The cemetery's roads were paved with macadam, while the county began work on grading and laying asphalt on Mayfield Road to upgrade it in time for the burial ground's opening. Other work at the site included the emplacement of stormwater sewers about 7 feet (2.1 m) belowground, and the construction of a front entrance consisting of wrought iron gates supported by several granite pillars. A.T. Russell sold 1,150 acres (4,700,000 m^{2}) of land to Knollwood in September 1909.

The first interments at Knollwood were about 300 bodies removed from the old Erie Street Cemetery in downtown Cleveland. Hiram Brott became the first contemporary person to be interred at Knollwood when he was buried there on April 27, 1910. Interments were relatively few in number until 1912. Demand for burial space was strong enough that by 1916 25 acres (100,000 m^{2}) of the cemetery had been cleared, landscaped, and plots laid out. Fully 16 acres (65,000 m^{2}) of this acreage was near the entrance of the cemetery, and consisted of a park-like garden cemetery. The remaining 9 acres (36,000 m^{2}) were more like a lawn cemetery. Another 45 acres (180,000 m^{2}) of the property had been cleared of underbrush and sodded, while 45 acres (180,000 m^{2}) remained heavily forested. The cemetery association also sold about 33 acres (130,000 m^{2}) of land, and spent $25,000 ($739,679 in 2025 dollars) constructing a caretaker's residence (which included a small chapel) and maintenance buildings. (Note: A different source claims the cemetery still had 250 acres (1,000,000 m^{2}) of land as of 1937. The sale of land may have come not from the cemetery itself, but from the Knollwood Cemetery Association's other extensive land-holdings.)

By the mid-1920s, Knollwood Cemetery was effectively a large land-holding company. In 1925, Knollwood sought to become a nonprofit organization. Under Ohio law, this meant the cemetery had to divest itself of most of its investments, which meant selling off land. This included the sale of 100 acres (400,000 m^{2}) of land to the new Acacia Park Cemetery, adjacent to Knollwood.

By the end of 1927, Knollwood Cemetery held more than 2,300 remains.

=== Mausoleum ===
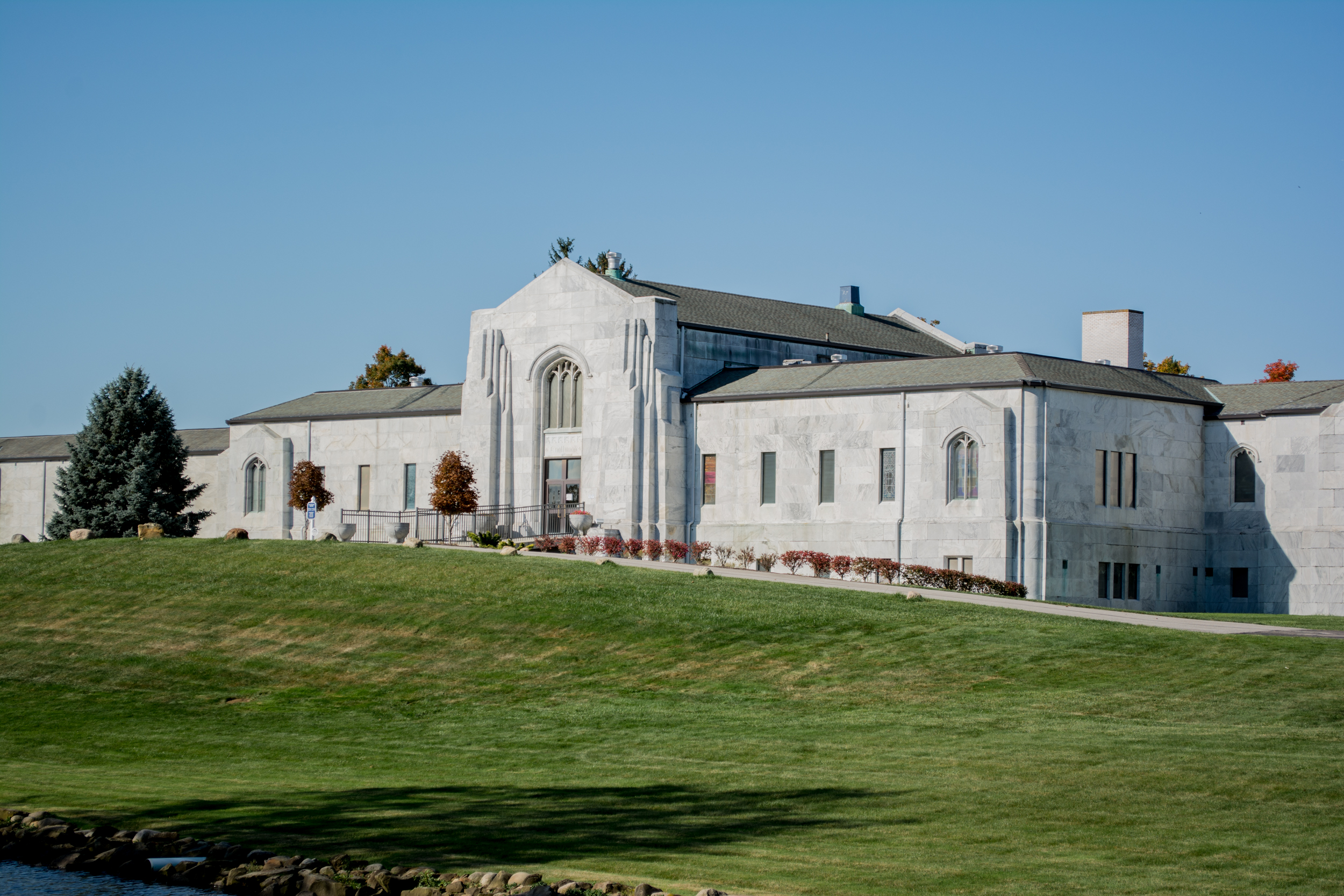
Knollwood Cemetery mausoleum.

In 1923, Knollwood Cemetery announced it had hired noted funerary architect Sidney Lovell to design a large, above-ground mausoleum for the cemetery. Plans called for the structure to be a mixture of Gothic Revival and Egyptian Revival, and for it to include two chapels and about 50 "private rooms" off the main corridor. It was completed about 1926. (Note: "Private rooms" are spaces in a mausoleum, usually gated or grilled and about 10 by 10 feet (3.0 by 3.0 m) in size, containing five to 10 single-capacity crypts.)

To decorate the mausoleum, the cemetery commissioned a number of large stained glass windows from Tiffany & Co., most of which were vaguely secular in nature. Other Tiffany windows were commissioned by individuals who owned crypts in the mausoleum. (Note: For example, Annette Kaple commissioned a window depicting a mountain scene from Tiffany in the early 1920s.) All of the windows were finished in the late 1920s and early 1930s, toward the end of Louis Comfort Tiffany's life, making it unclear how much work Tiffany himself put into their design. As of 2006, there were 17 windows in the mausoleum attributed to Tiffany.

In 1928, Knollwood Cemetery officials determined the mausoleum should be expanded. Hubbell & Benes, a Cleveland architectural firm, designed the addition, which was constructed by the Craig-Curtiss Co. The $175,000 ($3,281,250 in 2025 dollars) addition was finished in December 1928. Seven more additions were made between 1930 and 1959. A 4,842-square-foot (449.8 m^{2}) addition was added in 1997.

== Operational history ==
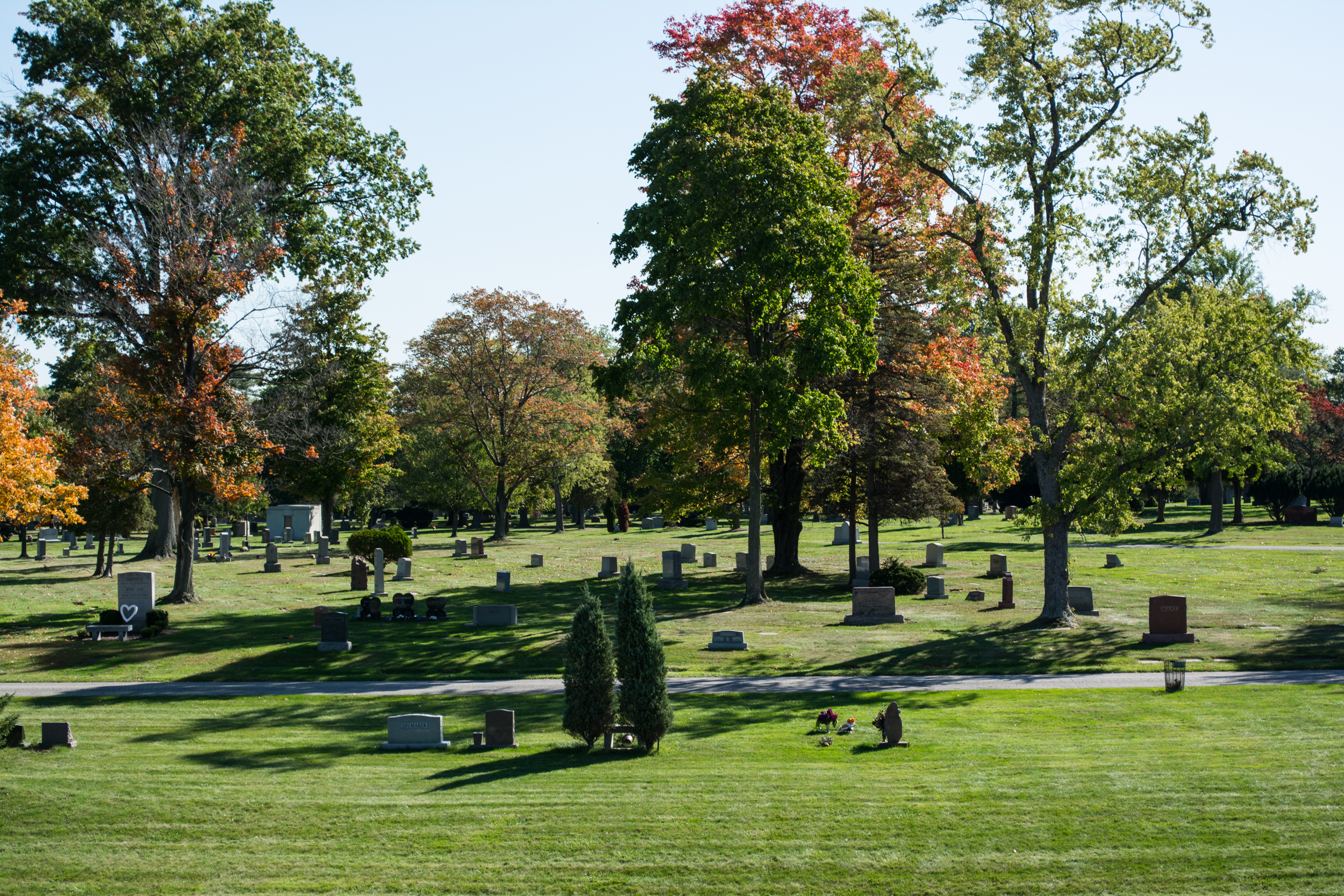
Section 27 at Knollwood Cemetery

In 1930, the Memorial Construction Company of Lansing, Michigan, purchased Knollwood Cemetery. Knollwood Cemetery was sold to Gibraltar Mausoleum Corp. in 1994, and in June 1995 Gibraltar was purchased by Service Corporation International.

Knollwood was sued over the mishandling of remains in 1983. In 1929, Katherine G. Mallison was buried in a family plot at Knollwood. Her granddaughter, Dorothy Mallison Carney, died in 1982. While digging the Carney grave, cemetery workers discovered that it was already occupied by a wooden burial vault containing Mallison's coffin. Cemetery workers used a backhoe to remove Mallison's burial vault and remains, which they dumped at a refuse site on the cemetery grounds. Carney's burial occurred a few hours later. In March 1983, a Cleveland television station broadcast news about the mishandling of remains at the cemetery. After an investigation revealed the remains were Mallinson's, Carney's children sued the cemetery and were awarded $56,000. Knollwood Cemetery appealed, but the Ohio Eighth District Courts of Appeals upheld the verdict in 1986.

In 1988, Knollwood Cemetery workers buried Ruth Pistillo in the wrong grave. The family discovered the error only when no headstone was placed on the grave Pistillo had purchased. Even after the error was discovered, Knollwood remained unsure as to who was buried in the wrong grave. Pistillo had to be disinterred and one of her family members had to identify the body. Her heirs received $101,000 in damages.

In 2002, Knollwood Cemetery sought permission from the city of Mayfield Heights to permit the drilling and operation of a natural gas well on its property by Bass Energy. Knollwood said the proposed wells would be in an area about 300 yards (270 m) from any graves, an area which would not be used for burials for at least 25 to 30 years. Knollwood said the wells would provide it with free natural gas for heating of its mausoleum and other buildings, and would give the cemetery much-needed revenue of about $50,000 a year for 10 years to help meet its $350,000-a-year operating costs. (Note: In testimony before the Ohio Senate, Forest P. Reichert, president of Knollwood Cemetery, claimed it took more than $8,000 a month to heat the mausoleum, and that a "recent" recarpeting cost $165,000.) The city denied the permit. The conflict led to the introduction of legislation in the Ohio Legislature to strip localities and counties of their authority to regulate oil and gas wells. This law passed in September 2004. Subsequently, three natural gas wells were drilled and began operation on the Knollwood property. The new law was challenged in court. As the lawsuit progressed, a Court of Common Pleas allowed production to continue at existing wells at the Knollwood Cemetery. The Ohio Supreme Court upheld the new state law in February 2015.

In 2008, the Vitale family sued Knollwood cemetery for placing a natural gas well too close to their mausoleum on the cemetery's grounds. The family also accused Knollwood (which had erected the mausoleum) of constructing such a poorly built structure that family members had to be disinterred and the mausoleum rebuilt. The case was dismissed with prejudice in May 2010.

Knollwood Cemetery had about 47,000 burials in 2007, and between 94 acres (380,000 m^{2}) and 96 acres (390,000 m^{2}) in 2008. Its mausoleum remained the largest in the state as of 2012.

== Notable interments ==
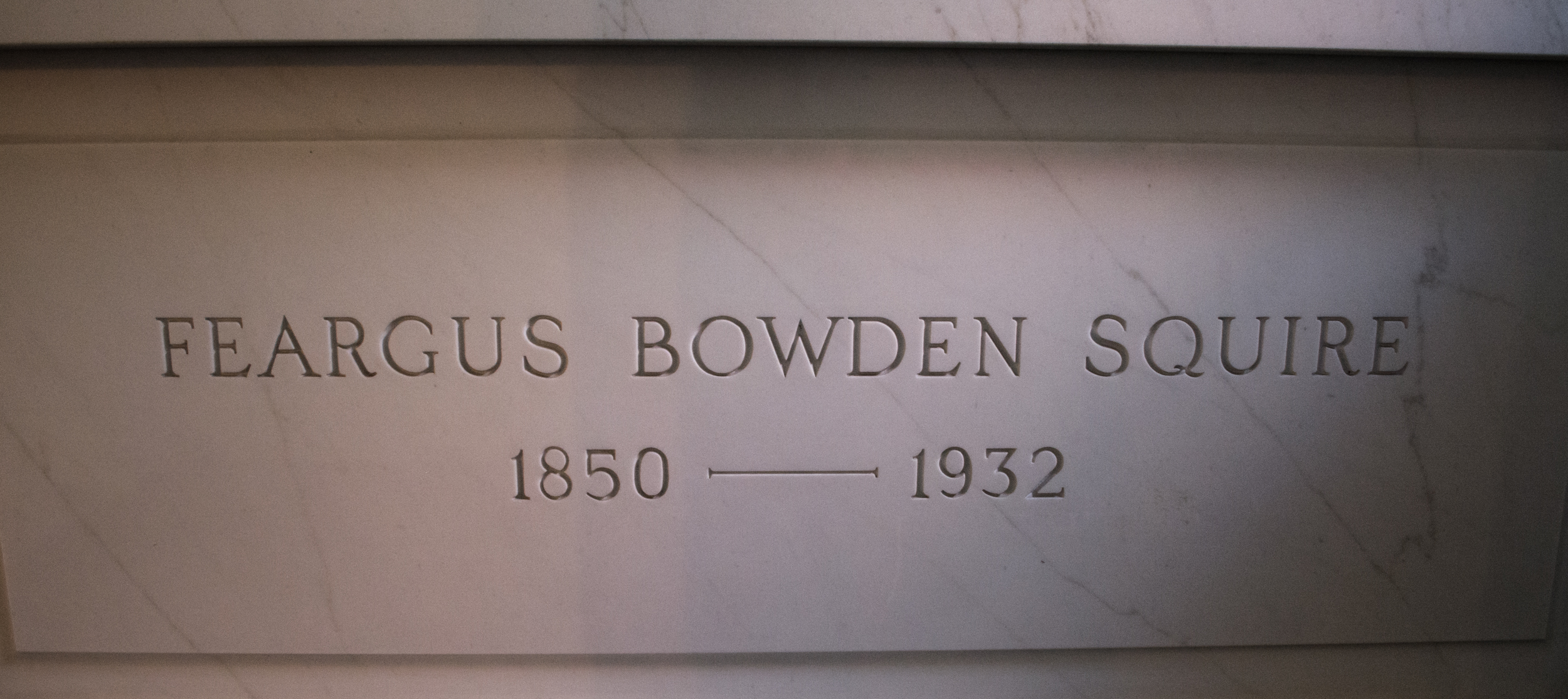
Feargus B. Squire crypt.

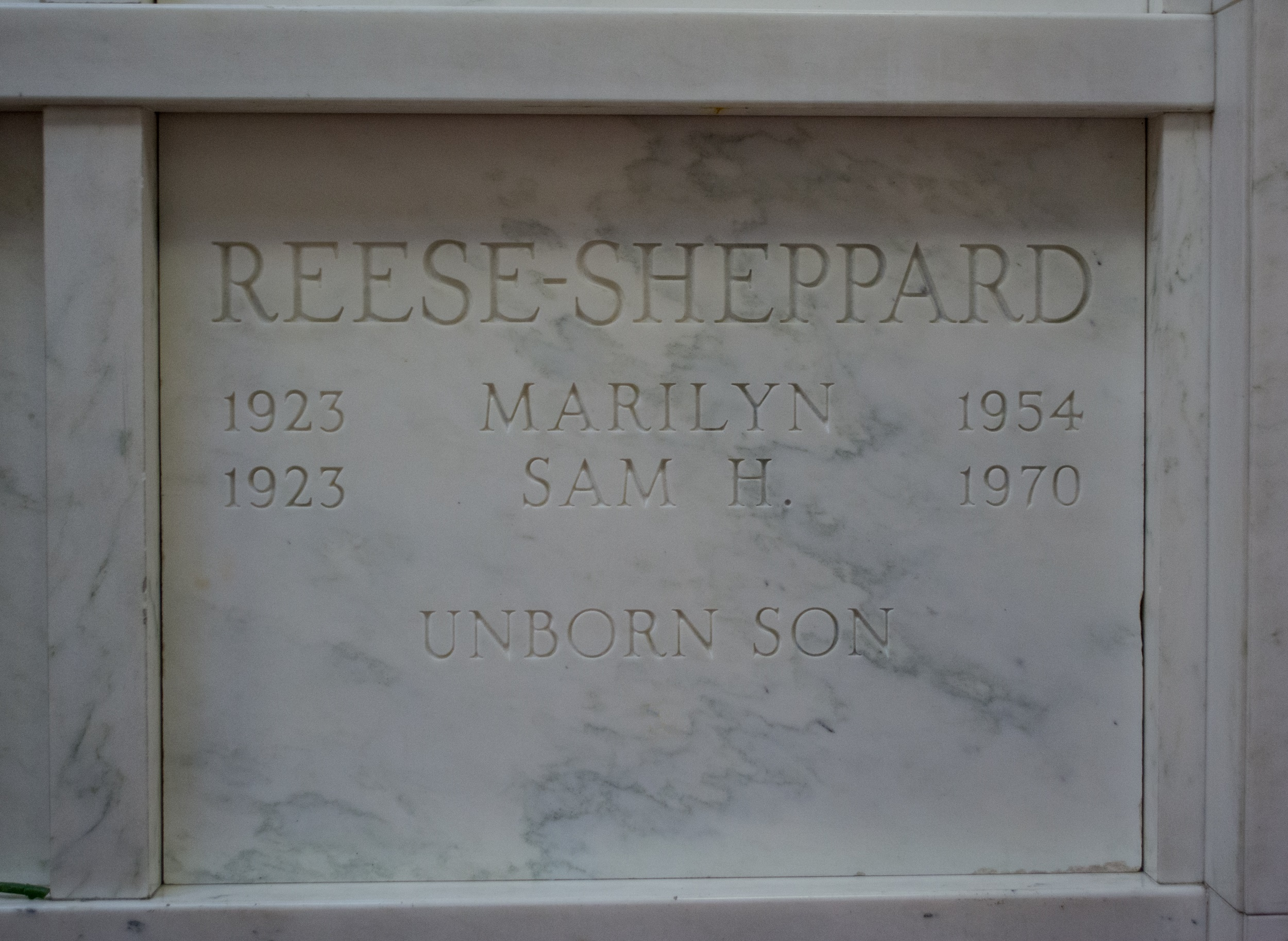
Sam and Marilyn Sheppard crypt.

A number of famous individuals are buried at Knollwood Cemetery. They include:

- Frederick Henry Herbert Adler (1885-1959), poet.
- Albert R. Bahr (1868-1939), founder, A.H. Bahr Lumber Co.
- Ernest Barnard (1874-1931), president of the Cleveland Indians Major League Baseball team from 1922 to 1927.
- Francis H. Beam (1900-1965), chairman of the board, National City Bank of Cleveland.
- George H. Bender (1896-1961), Republican who served in the United States House of Representatives from 1939 to 1947 and again from 1951 to 1954, and in the United States Senate from 1954 to 1957.
- Howard Simmons Booth (1891-1952), professor of chemistry at Western Reserve University.
- Fred H. Chapin (1875-1958), president, National Acme Co.
- Herb Conyers (1921-1964), first baseman for the Cleveland Indians from 1941 to 1942 and from 1946 to 1952.
- Alwin C. Ernst (1881-1948), co-founder, Ernst & Ernst.
- Billy Evans (1884-1956), Major League Baseball umpire; general manager, Cleveland Indians and Detroit Tigers; president, Southern Association league; and National Baseball Hall of Fame inductee.
- Finley Melville Kendall Foster (1892-1953), scholar of English literature, Western Reserve University.
- Sonny Geraci (1947-2017), lead singer of the rock music groups The Outsiders and Climax.
- Reynold Hinsdale (1879-1934), architect.
- Benjamin Franklin Hopkins (1876-1955), early automobile manufacturing executive.
- Pete Johns (1888-1964), infielder for the Chicago White Sox and from St. Louis Browns.
- Harvey Bryant Jordan (1895-1965), vice president of American Wire & Steel Co.
- Edwin Arthur Kraft (1883-1962), organist.
- George Miller (1898-1966), co-founder, Miller Drug Stores; president, Strong Cobb Arner pharmaceutical manufacturer; president, Distillata Co.
- Mike Murphy (1946-2006), drummer for the bands Bee Gees, Chicago, and The Manhattan Transfer.
- Newbell Niles Puckett (1897-1967), folklorist and professor of sociology, Western Reserve University.
- Thomas E. Orr (1891-1952), engineer and president, Keystone Plastics Company and Plastray Ltd.
- Ellis Ryan (1904-1966), owner of the Cleveland Indians from 1949 to 1952.
- Suzanne Schnitzer (1941-1984) Gates Mills resident from a prominent Gates Mills family, nurse, and patron of the arts.
- Jimmy Scott (1925-2014), jazz vocalist.
- Marilyn Reese Sheppard (1923-1954), murder victim and wife of Sam Sheppard. The fetus of her four-month-old unborn son was buried with her in 1955.
- Sam Sheppard (1923-1970), physician, husband of Marilyn Sheppard, and accused murderer. Originally buried at Forest Lawn Memorial Gardens in Columbus, Ohio, his remains were disinterred and cremated before being placed in his wife's crypt in 1997.
- Thomas Sinito (1938-1997), caporegime in the Cleveland crime family.
- Antanas Smetona (1874-1944), President of Lithuania from 1919 to 1920 and from 1926 to 1940. (His remains were moved to All Souls Cemetery in Chardon, Ohio, in 1975.)
- Feargus B. Squire (1850-1932), Standard Oil executive.
- Floyd St. Clair (1871-1942), composer with the Sam Fox Publishing Co.
- Jack R. Staples (1911-1990), investment banker and partner in Cascade Industries.
- Gordon A. Stouffer (1905-1956), restaurateur, heir to Stouffer's fortune.
- Terry Turner (1881-1960), infielder for the Cleveland Indians.
- Edith Anisfield Wolf (1889-1963), poet and philanthropist.
- D. Carl Yoder (1869-1963), Methodist minister and founder, World Religious News (a news service).
- Charles X. Zimmerman (1865-1926), brigadier general in the U.S. Army and sports team owner.

== Citations ==
Notes

Citations

== Bibliography ==
- Deal, Mary H. (1987). "Cemeteries". In Van Tassel, David D.; Grabowski, John J. (eds.). The Encyclopedia of Cleveland History. Bloomington, Ind.: Indiana University Press. ISBN 9780253313034.
- Downs, Winfield Scott (1934). Encyclopedia of American Biography. New Series. Vol. 12. New York: The American Historical Society.
- Historical Records Survey (1938). Inventory of the Municipal Archives of Ohio. Volume 2. Columbus, Ohio: Ohio Historical Records Survey Project.
- Lee, Bill (2009). The Baseball Necrology: The Post-Baseball Lives and Deaths of Over 7,600 Major League Players and Others. Jefferson, N.C.: McFarland & Co. ISBN 9780786442393.
- Sotheby's (1990). 20th Century Decorative Arts: Art Nouveau, Art Deco, American Arts and Crafts. New York: Sotheby's.
- Speenburgh, Gertrude (1956). The Arts of the Tiffanys. Chicago: Lightner Publishing Corp.
- Spencer, Thomas E. (1998). Where They're Buried: A Directory Containing More Than Twenty Thousand Names of Notable Persons Buried in American Cemeteries, With Listings of Many Prominent People Who Were Cremated. Baltimore, Md.: Clearfield Co. ISBN 9780806348230.
- Vigil, Vicki Blum (2007). Cemeteries of Northeast Ohio: Stones, Symbols and Stories. Cleveland: Gray & Co. ISBN 9781598510256.
