= Ellis Ryan =

American businessman, insurance executive & football club owner (1904-1966)

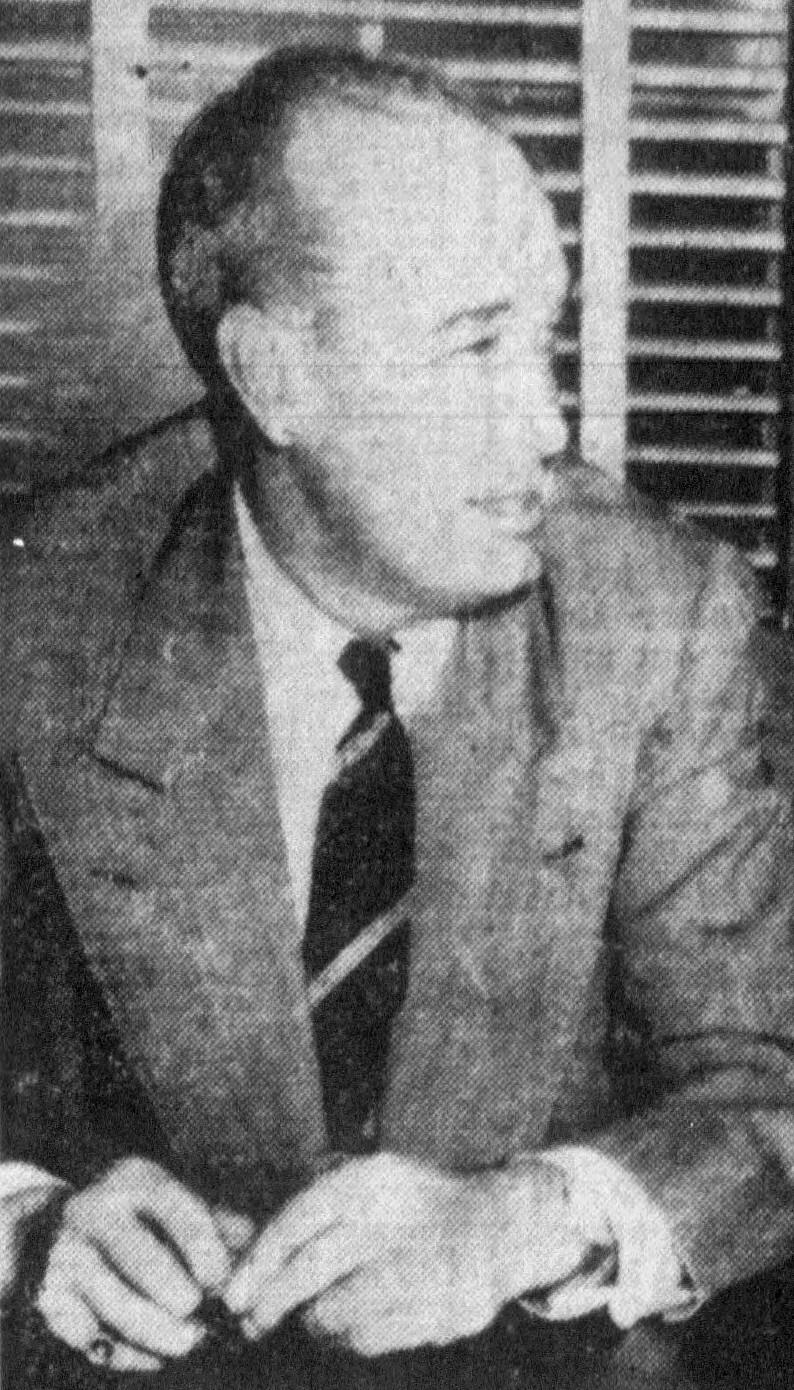
- Ryan in 1949
- Born: June 7, 1904; Cleveland, Ohio, U.S.
- Died: August 11, 1966 (aged 62); Fort Lauderdale, Florida, U.S.
- Education: Ohio State University
- Occupations: Businessman, insurance executive
- Known for: Owner of the Cleveland Indians, 1949–1952

Ellis W. Ryan (June 7, 1904 – August 11, 1966) was the principal owner of the Cleveland Indians of the American League from 1949 through 1952.

A Cleveland native, Ryan graduated from Ohio State University and went into the insurance business, eventually building one of the more successful insurance agencies in northeast Ohio, W. F. Ryan Insurance. His agency was located adjacent to the Cleveland Arena.

In 1949, Ryan headed a syndicate that purchased the Indians from Bill Veeck. At first, Ryan largely stayed in the background, leaving the baseball side mostly to newly appointed general manager Hank Greenberg. However, he did negotiate a long-term lease for Municipal Stadium. In 1952, the Indians suffered a marked downturn in attendance despite finishing only two games out of first. Ryan jettisoned five of the Indians' 13 minor league affiliates and laid off three scouts. Greenberg opposed these cutbacks, prompting Ryan to make plans to fire Greenberg and become his own general manager. When the board sided with Greenberg, Ryan sold his share of the franchise to a group headed by Myron H. Wilson.

Following the sale of the Indians, Ryan joined a syndicate headed by David Jones, a former Indians board member, that purchased the Cleveland Browns in 1953. That group sold the Browns to Art Modell in 1961. At one time, Ryan was also a part-owner of the Cleveland Arena and the Cleveland Barons minor league hockey team.

He died in 1966 at the age of 62 in Fort Lauderdale, Florida. His body was returned to Cleveland, and he was buried at Knollwood Cemetery in Mayfield Heights, Ohio.

== Bibliography ==
- Lee, Bill (2009). The Baseball Necrology: The Post-Baseball Lives and Deaths of Over 7,600 Major League Players and Others. Jefferson, N.C.: McFarland & Co. ISBN 9780786442393.
