= Pauline R. Kibbe =

American writer (1909–2006)

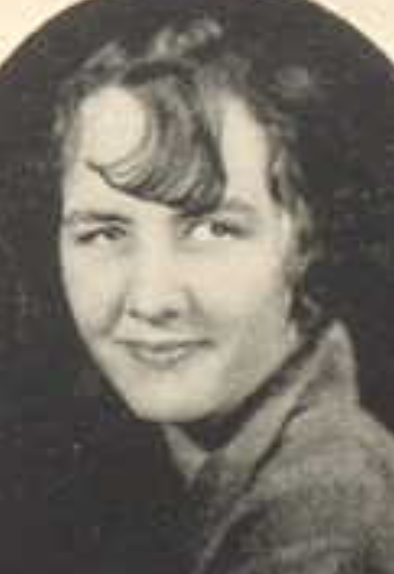
- Pauline Rochester (later Kibbe), from the 1926 yearbook of Brackenridge High School
- Born: Pauline Rochester; August 23, 1909; Pueblo, Colorado, U.S.
- Died: November 27, 1989 (age 80)
- Other names: Pauline Kibbe Povall
- Occupations: Writer, speaker, labor organizer, community leader

Pauline Rochester Kibbe Povall (August 23, 1909 – November 27, 1989) was an American author, speaker, labor organizer and community leader. She won the Anisfield-Wolf Award for her 1947 book about Latin Americans in Texas.

== Early life ==
Kibbe was born in Pueblo, Colorado, the daughter of Ernest Paul Rochester and Alta B. Nichols Rochester. Her father was a lawyer. Her family moved to San Antonio, Texas by 1920. She graduated from Brackenridge High School in 1926.

== Career ==
Kibbe was a bookkeeper in the 1930s. She was secretary of the Inter-American Committee of the University of Texas in 1943, and spoke to churches, clubs, women's groups, and student organizations about international relations.

Kibbe served as executive secretary of the Good Neighbor Commission of Texas from April 1943 until she resigned in August 1947 ahead of imminent dismissal by new commission appointees. Her book, Latin Americans in Texas (1947). won the Anisfield-Wolf Award for best non-fiction book about race relations in the United States.

In 1948 Kibbe was named Texas state director of the CIO's Political Action Committee. With the CIO Oil Workers Union, she investigated and worked against forced labor in the South. In 1949 she spoke at the first Texas convention of the American GI Forum, when it was held in Corpus Christi.

In 1950 she was appointed by governor William Lee Knous to a study committee on migrant agricultural labor on Colorado. In 1955, she was on the editorial staff of Mexico This Month, an English-language magazine about current affairs published by the North American Committee for Mexico. Later in life she co-owned a publishing company, Minutiae Mexicana S.A., based in Mexico City.

== Books ==
- Latin Americans in Texas (1947)
- Guide to Mexican History (1964)

== Personal life ==
Pauline Rochester married E. Luther Kibbe and had a daughter, Patricia. She was divorced by 1930, and living with her parents, brothers, and daughter in San Antonio. She married again to William S. Povall, a Denver businessman; they had a son, David. Kibbe. She lived in Mexico City after 1954. She moved to Michigan in 1982, and died in 1989, at the age of 80, at a hospital in Berrien, Michigan.
