= Mary Morris (writer) =

American writer

- Born: May 14, 1947 (age 79); Chicago, Illinois, U.S.
- Education: Tufts College; Harvard University; Columbia University
- Occupation: Author
- Spouse: Larry O'Connor
- Children: 1
- Parent(s): Sol Morris; Rosalie Morris
- Writing career
- Notable awards: Rome Prize (1980); Anisfield-Wolf Book Award (2016)
- Website: www.marymorris.net

Mary Morris (born May 14, 1947) is an American author and a professor at Sarah Lawrence College. Morris published her first book, a collection of short stories, entitled Vanishing Animals & Other Stories, in 1979 at the age of thirty-two and was awarded the Rome Prize in Literature by the American Academy and Institute of Arts and Letters. She has gone on to publish numerous collections of short stories, novels, and travel memoirs. She has also edited with her husband, the author Larry O'Connor, an anthology of women's travel literature, entitled Maiden Voyages, subsequently published as The Virago Book of Women Travellers. Her recent novel The Jazz Palace has been awarded the 2016 Anisfield-Wolf Award in fiction. This award goes to work that addresses issues of cultural diversity and racism in America.

== Early life ==
Morris was born in Chicago, Illinois to Sol Morris (a businessman who was a partner in his brother's architectural and engineering firm) and Rosalie Morris (a homemaker, but with a degree in fashion from the Art Institute of Chicago). They married quite late and were often mistaken for Mary's grandparents. She was raised on the North Shore of Lake Michigan in the suburb of Highland Park in Chicago, Illinois. At the time she was growing up, Highland Park was woodland and, as a child, she roamed its ravines and wandered its waterfront. Her earliest short stories are derived from these memories. She often rode horses through cornfields not far from her house. When she was sixteen, she rode a horse across Adlai Stevenson's front yard and he came out and waved. After a fairly rural childhood, she went east to attend Tufts College. Her junior year abroad in Paris in 1968 was also very informative for her writing. After college she worked at the Beacon Press for a few years, began graduate school at Harvard, but soon transferred to Columbia University in New York City where she did the bulk of her graduate work and began writing stories.

Though Morris never returned to the Midwest for very long, she often writes about the region and its tug. Many of her short stories and her early novels have been set in an imaginary town called Winona along the banks of Lake Michigan. While Morris is known for her numerous travel articles and memoirs set in far-off places, her roots remain in the Midwest. Morris likes the fact that there is more magnetism around the shores of Lake Michigan than the North Pole. She feels drawn there and has an affinity for Midwestern writers such as Willa Cather and Mark Twain who wrote their stories of the Middle West from afar. She now lives in Brooklyn, New York with her husband and daughter and teaches writing at Sarah Lawrence College.

== Literary career ==
In her first collection of short stories, Vanishing Animals & Other Stories, Morris writes about childhood and adolescent memories. The Chicago Tribune called Morris "a marvelous storyteller-a budding Isaac Bashevis Singer, a young Doris Lessing, a talent to be watched and read."

Morris's stories often deal with the tension between home and away. Travel is an important theme in many of the stories in her collections that include The Bus of Dreams and The Lifeguard: Stories. It is also a recurrent theme in her travel memoirs, including the acclaimed Nothing to Declare: Memoirs of a Woman Traveling Alone, Wall to Wall: From Beijing to Berlin by Rail, Angels & Aliens: A Journey West and The River Queen. In her novels, including The Waiting Room, The Night Sky (formerly published as A Mother's Love) and House Arrest, Morris writes of family, its difficulties and disappointments, its iron grip and necessity, and ultimately the comfort family can bring.

Morris keeps a blog called The Writer and the Wanderer where she writes about travel and literature. The blog also contains her evocative photos and watercolors. Her books have been translated into Italian, Spanish, German, Dutch, Swedish and Japanese. Morris is an American P.E.N. member and Fellow of the American Academy in Rome. Morris is not related to the writer Mary McGarry Morris, though she is related to the legendary publisher of the Grove Press, Barney Rosset. They are cousins.

== Teaching career ==
In 1980 after Vanishing Animals was published, Morris received the George W. Perkins fellowship from the Council of the Humanities at Princeton University. After her year as a fellow, she taught in the creative writing program until 1993 where she was colleagues with such writers as Joyce Carol Oates (a longtime mentor and friend), Russell Banks, Paul Auster, and Haruki Murakami (who mentions Morris briefly in his memoir about running). Morris also taught a number of students who went on to illustrious careers, including Jodi Picoult (who attributes her success to Morris' mentorship), Jonathan Ames, and Elissa Schappell. She went on to teach at New York University and University of California at Irvine before becoming a tenured member of the writing faculty at Sarah Lawrence College.

== Awards ==
- National Endowment for the Arts, 1978
- Rome Prize for Literature by the American Academy and Institute of Arts and Letters, 1980
- Guggenheim Fellowship, 1980
- Princeton University George W. Perkins Junior Fellowship of the Council of the Humanities, 1982
- American Council for the Arts First Prize in Literature, 1983
- The New York Foundation for the Arts - Artists Fellowship Program, 1985
- Anisfield-Wolf Award, 2016

== Published work ==
=== Short story collections ===
- The Lifeguard: Stories, 1997
- The Bus of Dreams: Stories, 1985
- Vanishing Animals 1979

=== Travel ===
- All The Way To The Tigers, 2020
- The River Queen, 2007
- Angels & Aliens: A Journey West, 1999
- Wall to Wall: From Beijing to Berlin by Rail, 1991
- Nothing to Declare: memoirs of a woman travelling alone, 1988

=== Fiction ===
- The Lost Gold of Blue Mountain, TBA
- Gateway to the Moon, 2018
- The Jazz Palace, 2015
- Revenge, 2004
- Acts of God, 2001
- House Arrest, 1996
- The Night Sky (formerly published as A Mother's Love), 1993
- The Waiting Room, 1989
- Crossroads, 1984

=== Short stories ===
Title	Year	First published	Reprinted/collected	Notes
Orphans of the Storm	1984	Morris, Mary (1984). "Orphans of the Storm". The Paris Review. 94 (Winter 1984).	Mary Morris (1985). The Bus of Dreams. Houghton Mifflin Harcourt, Boston, pp. 33–46.	
Standards	2011	"Standards". Narrative Magazine (Winter 2011).		
The Climax Forest	2011	"The Climax Forest". Narrative Magazine (Spring 2011).		
Birds of Africa	2012	"Birds of Africa". Narrative Magazine (Spring 2012). 6 September 2011.		
Flux	2012	"Flux". Ploughshares (Spring 2012).		
A Dangerous Creature	2014	"A Dangerous Creature". Narrative Magazine (Stories of the Week: 2013–2014).		
The Storm of the Century	2017	"The Storm of the Century". Narrative Magazine (Fall 2017).		
Flowing Streams	2018	"Flowing Streams". Narrative Magazine (Stories of the Week: 2017–2018).		
