= David Levering Lewis =

American historian (born 1936)

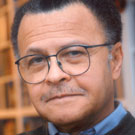
- Born: May 25, 1936 (age 90); Little Rock, Arkansas, U.S.
- Education: Fisk University; Columbia University; London School of Economics
- Children: 3
- Awards: Pulitzer Prize (1994, 2001); National Humanities Medal 2009; Bancroft Prize; Francis Parkman Prize
- Scientific career
- Fields: History
- Workplaces: New York University Rutgers University
- Website: NYU faculty page

David Levering Lewis (born May 25, 1936) is an American historian, a Julius Silver University Professor, and professor emeritus of history at New York University. He is twice winner of the Pulitzer Prize for Biography or Autobiography, for part one and part two of his biography of W. E. B. Du Bois (in 1994 and 2001, respectively). He is the first author to win Pulitzer Prizes for biography for two successive volumes on the same subject.

The author of eight books and editor of two more, Lewis concentrates on comparative history with special focus on twentieth-century United States social history and civil rights. His interests include nineteenth-century Africa, twentieth-century France, and Islamic Spain.

== Early life and education ==
Lewis was born in 1936 in Little Rock, Arkansas, to a middle-class African-American family. His father John Henry Lewis Sr. graduated from Morris Brown College in Atlanta, and Yale Divinity School, becoming its first African-American graduate. Lewis Sr. also earned an M.A. degree in sociology from the University of Chicago and became principal of Dunbar Junior and Senior High School and Junior College in Little Rock and President of Morris Brown College from 1920 to 1928 and again from 1951 to 1958. Lewis's mother, Alice U. Bell Lewis, taught high school math.

While the family lived in Little Rock, David Lewis attended parochial school and attended Wilberforce Preparatory School and Xenia High School after his father became Dean of the Theological School at Wilberforce University in Wilberforce, Ohio.

The family moved to Atlanta after his father became President of Morris Brown College, and Lewis attended Booker T. Washington High School in his junior year. He gained early admission at the age of fifteen to Fisk University in Nashville, Tennessee, and graduated Phi Beta Kappa in 1956.

Lewis briefly attended the University of Michigan Law School but left to attend Columbia University, where he earned his M.A. in history in 1959. He went to the London School of Economics for his doctorate, earning his Ph.D. in 1962 in modern European and French history.

In 1961–1962, Lewis served in the United States Army as a psychiatric technician and private first class in Landstuhl, Germany.

== Personal life ==
Lewis has three adult children from his first marriage to Sharon Lynn Lewis from 1964-1988, and two granddaughters. Lewis was married to Ruth Ann Stewart until her death in 2014.

== Academic career ==
In 1963, Lewis lectured at the University of Ghana on medieval African history. After returning to the United States, he taught at Morgan State University, the University of Notre Dame, Howard University, and the University of the District of Columbia from 1970 to 1980 as associate and full professor. Lewis was professor of history at University of California at San Diego from 1980 to 1984.

In 1985, Lewis joined Rutgers University as the Martin Luther King Jr. Professor of History, where he wrote his Pulitzer Prize-winning two-volume biography of W. E. B. Du Bois and finished writing The Race to Fashoda: European Colonialism and African Resistance in the Scramble for Africa during his 18-year tenure.

In the spring semester of 2001, Lewis served as distinguished visiting professor in Harvard's history department.

In 2003, he was appointed as the Julius Silver University Professor and Professor of History at New York University.

Lewis has received fellowships from the Center for Advanced Study in the Behavioral Sciences, the National Humanities Center, the Woodrow Wilson International Center for Scholars, the John Simon Guggenheim Foundation, the American Philosophical Society, and the John D. and Catherine T. MacArthur Foundation.

== Professional career ==
Lewis is the author of the first academic biography of Martin Luther King Jr., which was published in 1970, less than two years after the subject's assassination. His Prisoners of Honor: The Dreyfus Affair was published in 1974; The Bicentennial History of the District of Columbia was published in 1976; and When Harlem Was in Vogue in 1980. Lewis wrote his two-volume biography of W. E. B. Du Bois during his 18-year tenure at Rutgers.

In addition to the two Pulitzer Prizes for his volumes on W. E. B. Du Bois, published in 1994 and 2001, Lewis won the Bancroft Prize and the Francis Parkman Prize in 1994 for his first volume. In 2001, he won the Anisfield-Wolf Book Award for his second volume on Du Bois, published that year.

He is a former trustee of the National Humanities Center, former commissioner of the National Portrait Gallery, and a former senator of Phi Beta Kappa.

Lewis appeared as a historical expert in the 1999 film New York: A Documentary Film, directed by Ric Burns for PBS and The African Americans: Many Rivers to Cross 2013 documentary miniseries written and presented by Henry Louis Gates Jr. for PBS.

Lewis was president of the Society of American Historians in 2002, and is a board member of the magazine The Crisis, published by the NAACP. He is a fellow of the American Academy of Arts and Sciences and the American Philosophical Society. He was an Ellen Maria Gorrissen Fellow at the American Academy in Berlin, Germany, in spring 2008.

President Barack Obama awarded him the 2009 National Humanities Medal at the White House on February 25, 2010. Lewis delivered the inaugural convocation lecture at New York University Abu Dhabi in the United Arab Emirates on September 19, 2010.

=== Honorary degrees ===
- Doctorate of Humane Letters from Harvard University in 2023
- Doctor of Humane Letters from University of the District of Columbia in 2016
- Doctorate of Humane Letters, Honoris Causa, from Columbia University in 2015
- Honorary Degree from Northwestern University in 2010
- Honorary Degree from New School University in 2005
- Doctor of Humane Letters from Bates College in 2004
- Doctor of Humane Letters from Marymount Manhattan College in 2004
- Doctor of Letters from Emory University in 2003
- Doctor of Letters from Wheaton College in 2003
- Honorary Doctorate from Bard College in 2002
- Honorary Doctorate from Teachers College at Columbia University in 2002
- Honorary Doctorate from Lehman College in 1995

== Books ==
External videos
- Booknotes interview with Lewis on W.E.B. Dubois: The Biography of a Race, 1868–1919, January 2, 1994, C-SPAN
- Presentation by Lewis on W.E.B. Du Bois: The Fight for Equality and the American Century, 1919–1963 at the Atlanta History Center, October 30, 2000, C-SPAN
- Interview with Lewis about W.E.B. Du Bois: The Fight for Equality and the American Century, 1919–1963, April 29, 2001, C-SPAN
- Presentation by Lewis about his Du Bois biographies at the National Book Festival, September 8, 2001, C-SPAN
- Presentation by Lewis and Deborah Willis on their book A Small Nation of People: W.E.B. Du Bois and African American Portraits of Progress, October 29, 2003, C-SPAN
- Q&A interview with Lewis on The Improbable Wendell Willkie, November 4, 2018, C-SPAN

- King: A Biography. University of Illinois Press. 1970. ISBN 978-0-252-00680-7. University of Illinois Press, 1979.
- Prisoners of Honor: The Dreyfus Affair, William Morrow, 1974.
- District of Columbia: A Bicentennial History, W.W. Norton, 1976.
- The Race for Fashoda: European Colonialism and African Resistance in The Scramble for Africa. New York: Weidenfeld and Nicolson, 1987, ISBN 1-55584-058-2
- David L. Lewis (ed.), The Portable Harlem Renaissance Reader. Viking, 1994, ISBN 9780670845101
- William Edward Burghardt Du Bois (February 15, 1995). David Levering Lewis (ed.). W. E. B. Du Bois: A Reader. Henry Holt and Company. ISBN 978-0-8050-3264-2.
- When Harlem Was in Vogue. New York: Knopf, 1981, ISBN 9780394495729
- W. E. B. Du Bois: Biography of a Race, 1868–1919. Henry Holt and Company. 1993. ISBN 978-1-4668-4151-2.. Winner of the 1994 Pulitzer Prize for Biography, and winner also of the Bancroft and Parkman prizes.
- W. E. B. Du Bois, 1919–1963: The Fight for Equality and the American Century. Henry Holt and Company. September 1, 2001. ISBN 978-0-8050-6813-9.. Winner of the 2001 Pulitzer Prize for Biography and the Anisfield-Wolf Book Award
- The Race to Fashoda. Henry Holt. December 1, 2001. ISBN 978-0-8050-7119-1.
- (with Deborah Willis) A Small Nation of People: W. E. B. Du Bois & African American Portraits of Progress, HarperCollins, 2003.
- God's Crucible: Islam and the Making of Europe, 570–1215 (New York: W. W. Norton and Company, 2008)
- W.E.B. Du Bois: A Biography. Henry Holt and Company. August 4, 2009. ISBN 978-0-8050-8805-2.
- "The Implausible Wendell Willkie: Leadership Ahead of Its Time", in Walter Isaacson (ed.), Profiles in Leadership (W. W. Norton & Company, 2011)
- The Improbable Wendell Willkie: The Businessman Who Saved the Republican Party and His Country, and Conceived a New World Order. New York, NY: Liveright. 2018. ISBN 978-0-871-40457-2.
- The Stained Glass Window: A Family History as the American Story, 1790–1958. New York, NY: Penguin Press. 2025. ISBN 978-1-984-87990-5.
