= Edith Anisfield Wolf =

American poet

- Born: August 2, 1889; Cleveland, Ohio
- Died: January 23, 1963 (aged 73); Cleveland, Ohio
- Education: Western Reserve University
- Known for: Anisfield-Wolf Book Awards
- Scientific career
- Fields: Literature, Family Office

Edith Karolyn Anisfield Wolf (August 2, 1889 – January 23, 1963) was an American poet and philanthropist from Cleveland. She created and endowed an award in 1935 for non-fiction books that advance racial understanding, and in 1941 expanded the award to include fiction and poetry; the awards are now called the Anisfield-Wolf Book Awards.

== Life and career ==
Born in Cleveland, Ohio, in 1889 to Jewish parents Daniela (Guttenberg) and John Anisfield (born in Vienna), Edith Anisfield was her parents’ only child. Her father, a successful clothing manufacturer, realtor, civic leader and philanthropist, encouraged her extensive education and well-developed passion for social welfare. Able to read in French, German and Spanish, Wolf devoted her life to literature and charitable work. She was an active volunteer at the Cleveland Public Library for twenty years, serving as a trustee from 1943 to 1946, and she managed her father's philanthropy and the family holdings.

A prolific poet, Wolf published several poetry books including Snacks (1934), Cinquainiana (1935), Twin Brochures (1939), Balance (1942), and Wordmobile (1956).

Edith married attorney Eugene E. Wolf on August 7, 1918. She and Eugene had no children.

Upon her death, Edith willed all her books to the Cleveland Public Library, her family home on East Boulevard to the Cleveland Welfare Federation, and funds to The Cleveland Foundation for a $5,000 community service award, aid for the needy, and continuation of the Anisfield-Wolf Book Awards. Her remains were interred at the mausoleum at Knollwood Cemetery.

=== Anisfield-Wolf Book Awards ===
In 1935, she created an annual book award for non-fiction books that advance racial understanding, which she named the John Anisfield Award in honor of her father. In 1941 she added a second prize for creative literature in honor of her husband, and the awards were collectively called the Anisfield-Wolf Book Awards.

While Wolf never participated in the selection of awardees, she made certain that the Anisfield-Wolf juries were composed of highly respected literary figures. Ashley Montagu served as jury chairman from 1954 through 1995. Since 1996, the jury has been headed by Henry Louis Gates Jr. The Book Awards honored Harold Foote Gosnell in 1936 for his “Negro Politicians: Rise of Negro Politics in Chicago.” With over 200 honorees since the inception of the awards, notable recipients during Wolf's lifetime included Zora Neale Hurston, Langston Hughes, and Martin Luther King Jr. Notable recipients after her death have included Alex Haley, Gwendolyn Brooks, Nadine Gordimer, Toni Morrison, Derek Walcott, Wole Soyinka, Henry Louis Gates Jr., (also current Anisfield-Wolf Book Awards jurist), Ralph Ellison, Quincy Jones, Junot Díaz, Chimamanda Ngozi Adichie and Oprah Winfrey. The awards, $1,000 per recipient in the 1930s, now amount to $10,000 each. The categories are fiction, nonfiction, poetry and Lifetime Achievement. The Saturday Review magazine administered the awards while Wolf was alive. The awards are now managed by the Cleveland Foundation.

=== Bibliography ===
Poetry collections include:

- Snacks: a Bookful of Little Thoughts (Carr, 1934)
- Cinquainiana: a Bookful of Cinquains (The Verse-Land Press, 1935)
- Twin Brochures (Pegasus Studios, 1939)
- Balance: Bookful of Little Thoughts (The Erie Press, 1942)
- Wordmobile (Blue River Press, 1956), collected from the writer's poems appearing through the years in Blue River publications.
