= W. E. B. Du Bois: The Fight for Equality and the American Century, 1919–1963 =

Biography by David Levering Lewis

W.E.B. Du Bois: The Fight for Equality and the American Century, 1919–1963
- First edition
- Author: David Levering Lewis
- Language: English
- Genre: Nonfiction, biography
- Publisher: Henry Holt
- Publication date: 2000
- Publication place: United States
- Media type: Print (hardback & paperback)
- Pages: 608
- ISBN: 978-0805068139
- Preceded by: W. E. B. Du Bois: Biography of a Race, 1868–1919
- Followed by: A Small Nation of People: W. E. B. Du Bois & African American Portraits of Progress

W. E. B. Du Bois: The Fight for Equality and the American Century, 1919–1963 is the second installment of historian David Levering Lewis's two-part biography of W.E.B. Du Bois published by Henry Holt and Company in 2000. The book deals with Du Bois's involvement in the Harlem Renaissance, his fight for equality and justice, and the Communist witch-hunts that ultimately left him rejected and exiled in Ghana. Like the first part of the Lewis's study, which won in 1994, the book won the Pulitzer Prize for Biography or Autobiography in 2001, making Lewis the first author to win two Pulitzer Prizes for back-to-back volumes.
