= Ronald Takaki =

American academic, historian, ethnographer and author (1939–2009)

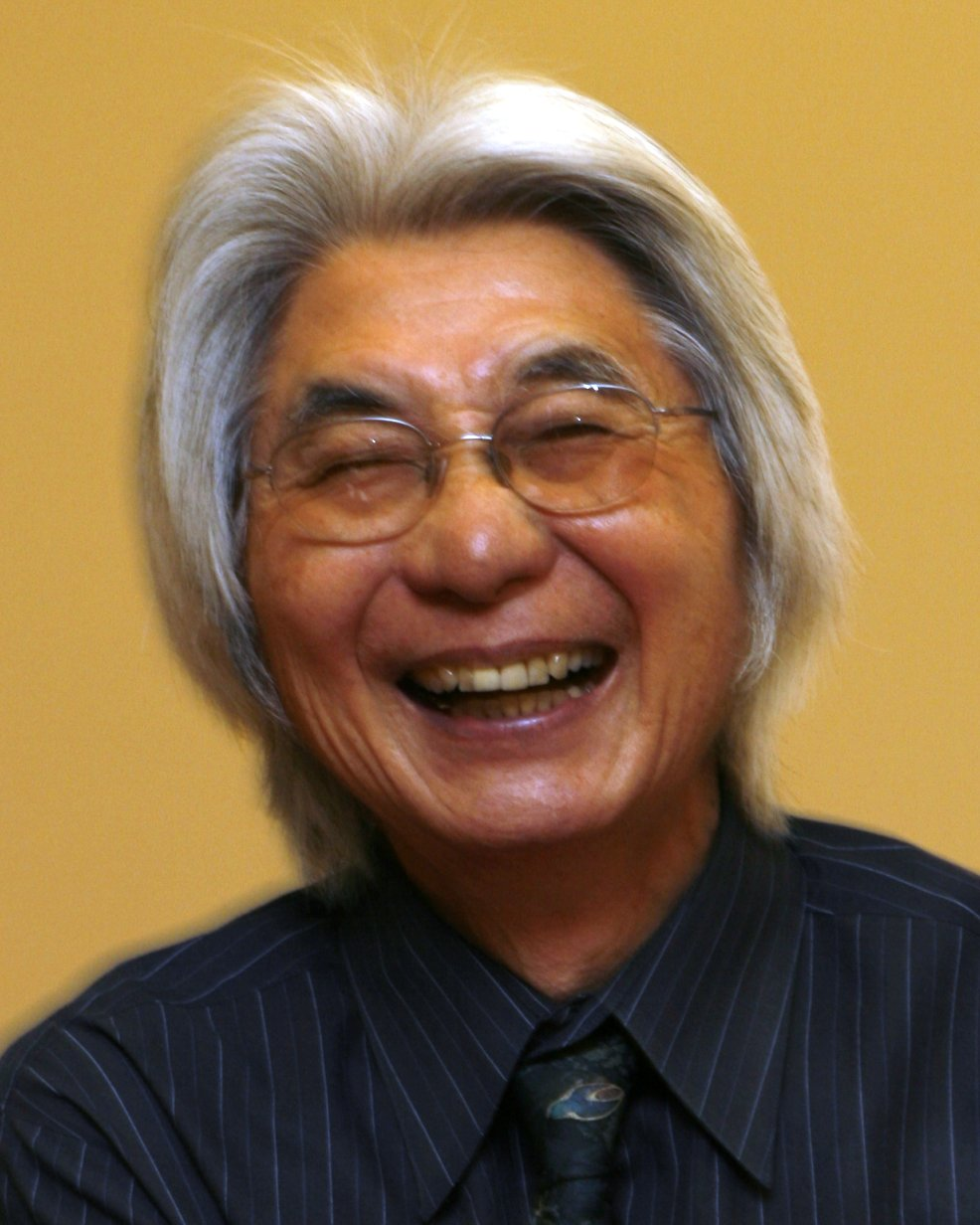
- Takaki at Northeastern University in 2007
- Born: April 12, 1939; Oahu, Hawaii Territory, U.S.
- Died: May 26, 2009 (aged 70); Berkeley, California, U.S.
- Occupation: Historian
- Known for: Ethnic studies author
- Title: Professor
- Spouse: Carol Rankin (m. 1961)
- Children: 3

Academic background
- Education: College of Wooster (BA); University of California, Berkeley (MA, PhD)
- Thesis: A pro-slavery crusade: The movement to reopen the African slave trade (1967)

Academic work
- Discipline: History
- Sub-discipline: Ethnic studies
- Institutions: University of California, Los Angeles; University of California, Berkeley

Ronald Toshiyuki Takaki (April 12, 1939 – May 26, 2009) was an American academic, historian, ethnographer and author. Born in pre-statehood Hawaii, Takaki studied at the College of Wooster and completed his doctorate in American history at the University of California, Berkeley.

His work addresses stereotypes of Asian Americans, such as the model minority concept. Among his most notable books are Strangers from a Different Shore: A History of Asian-Americans from 1989 and A Different Mirror: A History of Multicultural America from 1993. Takaki was a professor at the University of California, Los Angeles from 1966 to 1971 and University of California, Berkeley from 1971 to 2003.

== Early life ==
Born in 1939 in Hawaii Territory, Takaki grew up in the Palolo neighborhood of Honolulu. He was the descendant of Japanese immigrants who worked on the sugarcane plantations. His father, Harry Toshio Takaki, immigrated to Hawaii from Mifune, Kumamoto, Japan as a teenager and worked at a plantation in Puʻunene before studying under Ray Jerome Baker and opening his own photography studio. Harry died when Ronald was five, and Ronald's mother married Koon Keu Young, an immigrant from Guangdong, China who became Ronald's stepfather. As a young boy, Takaki cared more for surfing than academics, earning the nickname "10-toes Takaki." During high school a Japanese American teacher, Rev. Shunji Nishi Ph.D encouraged him to pursue college and wrote him a letter of recommendation for the College of Wooster in Wooster, Ohio.

His undergraduate experiences there caused him to begin asking the kinds of questions which evolved into the foundation of his career. As one of only two Asian Americans on campus, he gained a new awareness of his ethnic identity. He was awarded a bachelor's degree in history in 1961.

Takaki then began graduate studies in American history at the University of California, Berkeley and completed his master's degree in 1962 and Ph.D. in 1967. His dissertation was on the subject of American slavery, focusing on the rationale for slavery. This work later became his first book: A Pro-Slavery Crusade: the Agitation to Reopen the African Slave Trade.

Takaki's personal experiences inspired him to devote his life to working for equality for Asian Americans and others. A seminal event in his life developed when his wife's family refused to accept him because they could only see him as a "jap"—not as a native-born American citizen just like any one else.

== Academic career ==
His initial teaching experience was in 1966 at the University of California at Los Angeles, where he taught the first Black History course offered at that institution. When recalling his first day teaching this course, he stated, "When I walked into the classroom I discovered it was held in a huge auditorium - 500 seats and every seat was taken, and students were sitting in the aisles, and there was a loud chitter-chatter, the students were excited...As I made my way to the front of the auditorium all of a sudden a silence descended in this room and their eyes were riveted on me and I could just feel them saying to themselves, 'Funny, he doesn't look black'." One of his students on the first day asked what the class was going to learn about "revolutionary tactics," and he later recalled that his immediate response was to suggest that he hoped students would learn skills of critical thinking and effective writing—and that these could be quite revolutionary.

In 1971, he accepted a teaching position at Berkeley where his general survey course, "Racial Inequality in America: a Comparative Perspective," led the development of an undergraduate ethnic studies major and an ethnic studies Ph.D. program. For the next three decades, he continued to be an important contributor in the growth of the program. He was involved in developing the school's multicultural requirement for graduation: the American Cultures Requirement. The long-time Professor of Asian American Studies retired in 2003.

== Personal life ==
Takaki married Carol Rankin in 1961; they met as students at the College of Wooster. They had three children. Takaki died of suicide on May 26, 2009, in Berkeley, California, after having multiple sclerosis for nearly 20 years, according to his son Troy.

== Honors ==
- Association of Asian American Studies (AAAS), Lifetime Achievement Award, 2009.
- Bay Area Book Reviewers Association, Fred Cody Lifetime Achievement Award, 2002.
- Asia Pacific Council, Lifetime Achievement Award, 2002.
- Society of American Historians (SAH), 1995.
- Cornell University, Messenger Lecturer, 1993.

== Bibliography ==
- Takaki, Ronald T. (1971). A Pro-slavery Crusade: The Agitation to Reopen the African Slave Trade. New York: Free Press. ISBN 978-0-02-932430-1. OCLC 135218.
- Takaki, Ronald (1984). Pau Hana: Plantation Life and Labor in Hawaii, 1835-1920. Honolulu: University of Hawaii Press. ISBN 978-0-8248-0956-0. OCLC 13847902.
- Takaki, Ronald T. (1993) [1972]. Violence in the Black Imagination: Essays and Documents (Expanded ed.). New York: Oxford University Press. ISBN 978-0-19-508249-4. OCLC 26858128.
- Takaki, Ronald (1994) [1987]. From Different Shores: Perspectives on Race and Ethnicity in America (Expanded ed.). New York: Oxford University Press. ISBN 978-0-19-508368-2. OCLC 28332474.
- Takaki, Ronald; Steoff, Rebecca (1994). Issei and Nisei: The Settling of Japanese America. New York: Facts On File. ISBN 978-0-7910-2179-8. OCLC 28675449.
- Takaki, Ronald (1994). From the Land of Morning Calm: The Koreans in America. New York: Chelsea House. ISBN 978-0-7910-2181-1. OCLC 29478707.
- Takaki, Ronald (1994). Ethnic Islands: The Emergence of Urban Chinese America. New York: Chelsea House. ISBN 978-0-7910-2180-4. OCLC 28965757.
- Takaki, Ronald (1995). India in the West: South Asians in America. New York: Chelsea House. ISBN 978-0-7910-2186-6. OCLC 30360857.
- Takaki, Ronald (1995). Hiroshima: Why America Dropped the Atomic Bomb. Boston: Little, Brown and Company. ISBN 978-0-316-83124-6. OCLC 35272716.
- Solnit, Rebecca; Takaki, Ronald (1995). Tracing Cultures. San Francisco: Friends of Photography. ISBN 0-933286-69-4.
- Takaki, Ronald (1998) [1989]. Strangers from a Different Shore: A History of Asian Americans (Revised and updated ed.). New York: Back Bay Books. ISBN 978-0-316-83130-7. OCLC 80125499.
- Takaki, Ronald (2000) [1979]. Iron Cages: Race and Culture in Nineteenth-Century America (Revised ed.). New York: Oxford University Press. ISBN 978-0-19-513737-8. OCLC 638854790.
- Takaki, Ronald (2001). Double Victory: A Multicultural History of America in World War II. Boston: Back Bay Books. ISBN 978-0-316-83156-7. OCLC 47828820.
- Takaki, Ronald (2002). Debating Diversity: Clashing Perspectives on Race and Ethnicity in America. New York: Oxford University Press. ISBN 978-0-19-514651-6. OCLC 48013647.
- Takaki, Ronald (2008) [1993]. A Different Mirror: A History of Multicultural America (Revised ed.). Boston: Little, Brown and Company. ISBN 978-0-316-02236-1. OCLC 243768090.

== See also ==
- A Different Mirror: A History of Multicultural America
