= Christine Leigh Heyrman =

American historian

- Education: Macalester College; Yale University (PhD)
- Occupations: Historian; writer
- Writing career
- Notable awards: Bancroft Prize (1998); Francis Parkman Prize (2016)

Christine Leigh Heyrman is an American historian.

== Life ==
She graduated from Macalester College in 1971, and from Yale University with a Ph.D. in 1977. She is Grimble Professor of American History at the University of Delaware. Her current research focuses on the first cohort of American Protestant missionaries in the Middle East (1820–1860).

== Awards ==
- 1998 Bancroft Prize
- 2016 Francis Parkman Prize

== Works ==
- Heyrman, Christine Leigh. “The Separation of Church and State from the American Revolution to the Early Republic.” Divining America, National Humanities Center
- Commerce and Culture: The Maritime Communities of Colonial Massachusetts, 1690-1750. W W Norton & Co Inc. 1986. ISBN 978-0-393-95518-7.
- Southern Cross: The Beginnings of the Bible Belt. Knopf. 1997. ISBN 978-0-679-44638-5.
- Nation of Nations: A Narrative History of the American Republic. McGraw-Hill College. 2004. ISBN 978-0-07-299631-9. (6th ed., 2007)
- American Apostles: When Evangelicals Entered the World of Islam Farrar, Straus, and Giroux, 2015. ISBN 978-0-809-02398-1.
