= W. E. B. Du Bois: Biography of a Race, 1868–1919 =

Nonfiction book written by David Levering Lewis

W.E.B. Du Bois: Biography of a Race, 1868–1919
- First edition
- Author: David Levering Lewis
- Language: English
- Genre: Nonfiction
- Publisher: Henry Holt
- Publication date: 1993
- Publication place: United States
- Media type: Print (hardback & paperback)
- Pages: 752
- ISBN: 978-0-8050-3568-1
- Preceded by: The Harlem Renaissance Reader (editor)
- Followed by: When Harlem Was in Vogue

W.E.B. Du Bois: Biography of a Race, 1868–1919 is a nonfiction book written by historian David Levering Lewis and published in 1993 by Henry Holt and Company. The book studies the early and middle years of Du Bois's life. It is the first in a two-part biography of W.E.B. Du Bois. It won the Pulitzer Prize for Biography in 1994, as did Lewis's second installment, W. E. B. Du Bois: The Fight for Equality and the American Century 1919-1963, winning the Pulitzer in 2001.
