= Teju Cole =

Nigerian American writer, photographer, and art historian

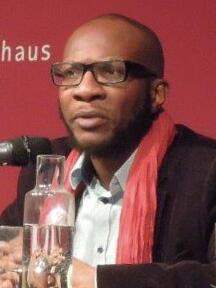
- Cole in 2013
- Born: Obayemi Babajide Adetokunbo Onafuwa; June 27, 1975 (age 51); Kalamazoo, Michigan, U.S.
- Education: Kalamazoo College (BA); SOAS, University of London (MA); Columbia University (M.Phil)
- Occupations: Novelist, photographer
- Writing career
- Notable work: Open City (2011)
- Website: www.tejucole.com

Teju Cole (born June 27, 1975) is a Nigerian American writer, photographer, and art historian. He is the author of a novella, Every Day Is for the Thief (2007); a novel, Open City (2011); an essay collection, Known and Strange Things (2016); a photobook, Punto d'Ombra (2016); and a second novel, Tremor (2023). Critics have praised his work as having "opened a new path in African literature."

== Personal life and education ==
Cole was born in Kalamazoo, Michigan, to Nigerian parents, and is the oldest of four children. Cole and his mother returned to Lagos, Nigeria, shortly after his birth, where his father joined them after receiving his MBA from Western Michigan University. Cole moved back to the United States at the age of 17 to attend Western Michigan University for one year, then transferred to Kalamazoo College, where he received his bachelor's degree in 1996. After dropping out of medical school at the University of Michigan, Cole enrolled in an African art history program at the School of Oriental and African Studies in London, then pursued a doctorate in art history at Columbia University. He is the Gore Vidal Professor of the Practice of Creative Writing at Harvard University and currently lives in Cambridge, Massachusetts.

== Career ==
=== Author ===
Cole is the author or co-author of several books, among them the novella Every Day Is for the Thief; the novel Open City; a collection of more than 40 essays, Known and Strange Things; and a photobook, Punto d'Ombra (2016) (published in English in 2017 as Blind Spot). Salman Rushdie has described Cole as "among the most gifted writers of his generation".

He was a Distinguished Writer in Residence at Bard College. From June to November 2014 he was "writer in residence" of the Literaturhaus Zurich and the PWG Foundation in Zurich.

==== Every Day Is for the Thief ====
Published in 2007, Cole's debut novel, Every Day Is for the Thief, is the story of a young man who sets out to visit his home country, Nigeria, after being away for fifteen years. The novel reads like a travel diary explaining the way of life in the city of Lagos and along the way, exposes how the democratic nature of corruption can affect anyone regardless of their status in the society.

==== Open City ====
Written in 2011 and published in 2012, the novel focuses on "Nigerian immigrant Julius, a young graduate student studying psychiatry in New York City, has recently broken up with his girlfriend and spends most of his time dreamily walking around Manhattan. The majority of Open City centers on Julius' inner thoughts as he rambles throughout the city, painting scenes of both what occurs around him and past events that he can't help but dwell on. Ostensibly in search of his grandmother, Julius spends a number of weeks in Belgium, where he makes some interesting friends. Along the way, he meets many people and often has long discussions with them about philosophy and politics. He seems to welcome these conversations. Upon returning to New York, he meets a young Nigerian woman who profoundly changes the way he sees himself."

Open City was translated into ten languages and has received generally positive reviews from literary critics. James Wood in The New Yorker calls it a "beautiful, subtle, and, finally, original novel". According to The New York Times, "the novel's importance lies in its honesty." The Independent characterizes Open City as "hypnotic", "transfixing", and a "striking debut" for Cole, while Time referred to the novel as "a profoundly original work, intellectually stimulating and possessing of a style both engaging and seductive."

==== Known and Strange Things ====
In 2016, Cole published his first collection of essays and criticism. Writing for the New York Times, the poet Claudia Rankine called it "an essential and scintillating journey," and singled out, in particular, his essays on photography, wherein he "reveals [his] voracious appetite for and love of the visual."

=== Journalism and social commentary ===
Cole is a regular contributor to publications including the New York Times, Qarrtsiluni, Granta, The New Yorker, Transition magazine, The New Inquiry, and A Public Space. Quarrtsiluni (2005–2013) was an online literary magazine that attempted to edit blog software from social media; the purpose behind it was to give full access to writers/commentators of various issues "who never quite realized our dream of creating a print-on-demand option for each issue." His monthly column for The New York Times Magazine, "On Photography," was a finalist for a National Magazine Award in 2016.

Cole has been credited with coining the term "White Savior Industrial Complex" with a series of tweets followed by an article published in The Atlantic. The original series of tweets that precipitated the article elicited a response from NY Times columnist Nicholas Kristof whom Cole named as an example of a white savior. Kristof mistakenly referred to Cole, a Nigerian-American, as a Ugandan, said that he believed Cole was part of a backlash against white humanitarians from middle-class African scholars. Kristof said that he felt uncomfortable because he thought that Cole was saying that "white Americans should not intervene in a humanitarian disaster because the victims are of a different skin color." Cole responded, saying that he was concerned by Kristof's sentimentality and his lack of analysis of the context of humanitarian need in Africa: "All he sees is need, and he sees no need to reason out the need for the need."

Alongside Michael Ondaatje, Francine Prose, Peter Carey, Rachel Kushner, and Taiye Selasi, Cole was one of six writers who protested the PEN American Center gala honoring the French satirical magazine Charlie Hebdo with its "Freedom of Expression Courage" award in April 2015 by withdrawing as co-hosts of the event. Writing in The New Yorker two days after the massacre of the Charlie Hebdo staff by Islamists in Paris, Cole claimed that the French publication was "racist and Islamophobic", a charge met with criticism from numerous commentators, including the president of SOS Racisme, France's leading anti-racism organization, who praised Charlie Hebdo as "the greatest anti-racist weekly in this country."

=== Photography ===
Cole's photography was shown in a solo exhibition in Milan in 2016 called Punto d'ombra. The photographs from this exhibition were published by the Italian publisher Contrasto Books in 2016, and by Random House in 2017 under the title Blind Spot.

For Performa 17, Cole created the installation Black Paper (2017) in which his photographs and videos were accompanied by a score of field recordings and readings of incisive text. The artwork was presented at the BKLYN Studios at City Point.

=== Social media ===
Cole's innovative use of social media (particularly Twitter and Instagram) as a creative platform has been widely acknowledged.

== Awards and honors ==
- 2011 Time magazine's "Best Books of the Year" for Open City
- 2012 National Book Critics Circle Award finalist for Open City
- 2012 PEN/Hemingway Award for Debut Novel winner for Open City
- 2012 Ondaatje Prize shortlist for Open City
- 2012 The Morning News Tournament of Books finalist
- 2013 International Literature Award for the German-language translation by Christine Richter-Nilsson of Open City
- 2015 Windham–Campbell Literature Prize (Fiction) valued at $150,000
- 2018 Guggenheim Foundation Fellowship for Creative Arts

== Publications ==
=== First edition in English in the United States ===
- Cole, Teju (2014). Every Day Is for the Thief (hardcover 1st ed.). New York: Random House. ISBN 9780812995787. A novella.
- —— (2011). Open City (hardcover 1st ed.). New York: Random House. ISBN 9781400068098. A novel
- —— (2016). Known and Strange Things. New York: Random House. ISBN 9780812989786. An essay collection.
- —— (2017). Blind Spot (English-language 1st ed.). New York: Random House. ISBN 9780399591075. A photobook.
- —— (2021). Black Paper: Writing in a Dark Time. Chicago: University of Chicago Press. ISBN 9780226641355. Text and illustrations.
- —— (2023). Tremor (hardcover 1st ed.). New York: Random House. ISBN 9780812997118. A novel.

=== First edition in England ===
- —— (2020). Fernweh (hardcover ed.). London: Mack Books. ISBN 9781912339549. Photographs.
- —— (2021). Golden Apple of the Sun. London: Mack Books. ISBN 9781913620219. Photographs and text.
- —— (2024). Pharmakon (paperback 1st ed.). London: Mack Books. ISBN 9781915743398. Photographs.

=== First edition published elsewhere ===
- Cole, Teju (2007). Every Day Is for the Thief (paperback 1st ed.). Abuja: Cassava Republic Press. ISBN 9789780805159.
- —— (2016). Punto d'ombra [Blind Spot] (in Italian). Translated by Gioia Guerzoni. Foreword by Siri Hustvedt. Rome: Contrasto. ISBN 9788869656538.
