= Steven Polson =

American portrait painter (born 1962)

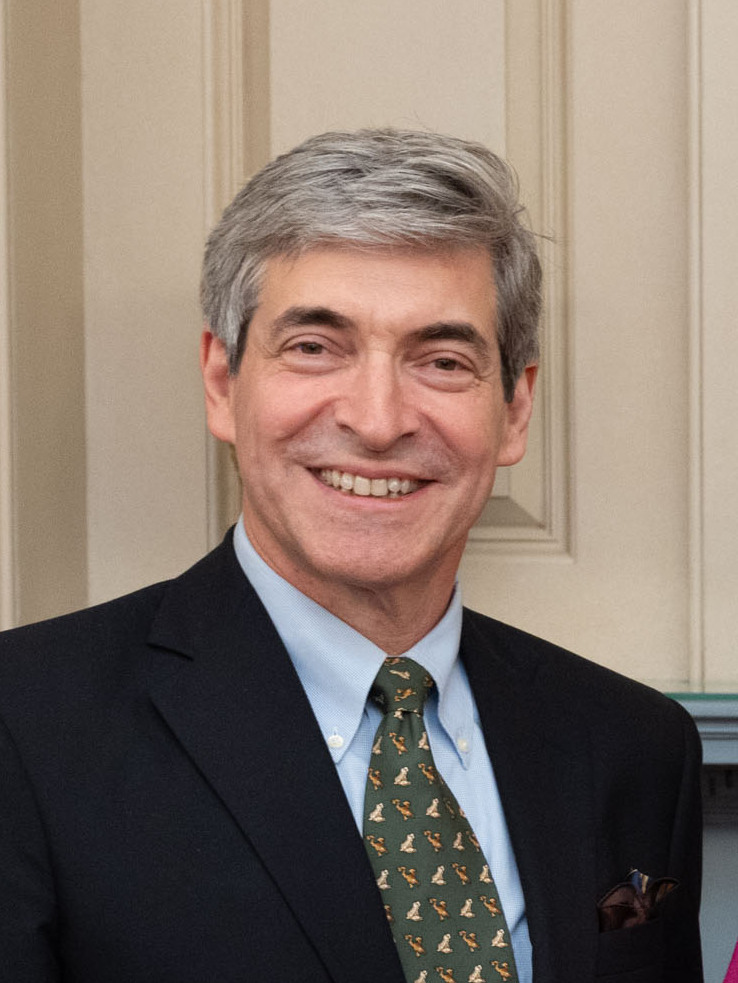
Polson in 2023

Steven Polson (born 1962) is an American portrait painter. He has painted the portraits of numerous United States government officials such as Madeleine Albright, General Colin Powell, and Condoleezza Rice.

He has won numerous awards for his painting, including The Elizabeth Greenshields Foundation Grant and The Allied Artists of America Gold Medal of Honor.

== Early life and education ==
Polson was born in New York City. At age 16, Polson began study of portrait and figure painting at the Art Student's League of New York under Daniel E. Greene. In 1984, he received a Bachelor of Fine Arts degree from The Cooper Union for the Advancement for Science and Art.

== Careers ==
Polson has taught drawing and painting at the Art Student's League of New York, National Academy of Design the Pratt Institute and privately at his studio.

He has been commissioned to paint the portraits of United States government officials including former Defense secretary Donald Rumsfeld; former Secretaries of State Madeleine Albright, Hillary Clinton, Condoleezza Rice, Collin Powell and John Kerry; former Commerce secretary Ron Brown; former Energy secretary and Ambassador to the United Nations Bill Richardson; and former EPA administrator Christine Todd Whitman among others.

His portraits are in the collections of Harvard University, Yale University, Massachusetts Institute of Technology, Cornell University, Brown University, Tsinghua University, U.S. Capitol, U.S. House of Representatives, U.S., Departments of State, U.S. Department of the Treasury, U.S. Department of Defense, Home of the Commandants, Central Intelligence Agency and Carnegie Museum of Art among many others.

== Notable subjects ==
Portraits which Polson has painted include:

- Madeleine Albright
- Hillary R. Clinton
- John F. Kerry
- John Mack
- Leon Panetta
- Colin Powell
- Condoleezza Rice
- Robert Rubin
- Donald Rumsfeld
- Stephen Schwarzman
- Ruth Simmons
- Lawrence Summers
- George Tenet
- General James Jones
- Susan Hockfield
