= Lucia Berlin =

American short story writer (1936–2004)

- Born: Lucia Brown; November 12, 1936; Juneau, Alaska, U.S.
- Died: November 12, 2004 (aged 68); Marina del Rey, California, U.S.
- Occupation: Writer

Lucia Brown Berlin (November 12, 1936 – November 12, 2004) was an American short story writer. She had a small, devoted following, but did not reach a mass audience during her lifetime. She rose to sudden literary fame in 2015, eleven years after her death, with the publication of a volume of her selected stories, A Manual for Cleaning Women.

== Early life ==
Berlin was born in Juneau, Alaska, and spent her childhood on the move, following her father's career as a mining engineer. The family lived in mining camps in Idaho, Montana, Arizona, El Paso, Texas and Chile, where Lucia spent most of her youth. As an adult, she lived in New Mexico, Mexico, New York City, Northern and Southern California, and Colorado.

== Career ==
Berlin began publishing relatively late in life, under the encouragement and sometimes tutelage of poet Ed Dorn. Her first small collection, Angels Laundromat, was published in 1981, but her published stories were written as early as 1960. She published seventy-six stories in her lifetime. Several of her stories appeared in magazines such as The Atlantic and Saul Bellow's The Noble Savage. Berlin published six collections of short stories, but most of her work can be found in three later volumes from Black Sparrow Books: Homesick: New and Selected Stories (1990), So Long: Stories 1987-92 (1993) and Where I Live Now: Stories 1993-98 (1999).

Berlin was never a bestselling author during her lifetime, but was widely influential within the literary community. She has been compared to Raymond Carver and Richard Yates. Her one-page story "My Jockey," consisting of five paragraphs, won the Jack London Short Prize for 1985. Berlin also won an American Book Award in 1991 for Homesick, and was awarded a fellowship from the National Endowment for the Arts.

In 2015, a compendium of her short story work was released under the title, A Manual for Cleaning Women: Short Stories. It debuted at #18 on the New York Times bestseller list its first week, and rose to #15 on the regular list the following week. The collection was ineligible for most of the year-end awards (either because she was deceased, or it was recollected material), but was named to a large number of year-end lists, including the New York Times Book Reviews "10 Best Books of 2015." It debuted at #14 on the ABA's Indie bestseller list and #5 on the Los Angeles Times' list. It was also a finalist for the Kirkus Prize. In 2024, it was ranked #79 of the 100 Best Books of the 21st century by the New York Times. Within a few weeks it had outsold all of Berlin's previous books combined.

== Influences and teaching ==
Throughout her life, Berlin earned a living doing working-class jobs, among them a position as a cleaning woman and one as a telephone receptionist.

Up through the early 1990s, Berlin taught creative writing in a number of venues, including the San Francisco County Jail and the Jack Kerouac School of Disembodied Poetics at Naropa University. She also took oral histories from elderly patients at Mt. Zion Hospital.

She was interested in artist's books and the publishing process. Working with Poltroon Press, she designed some of her own books and typeset them. She would revise them as she set the print. She also produced chapbooks.

In the fall of 1994, Berlin began a two-year teaching position as Visiting Writer at the University of Colorado, Boulder. Near the end of her term, she was one of four campus faculty awarded the Student Organization for Alumni Relations Award for Teaching Excellence. "To win a teaching award after two years is unheard of," the English Chair Katherine Eggert said later in an obituary. She was named associate professor, and continued teaching there until 2000.

She has entered the canon of the most important North American authors who published after 1950.

== Style ==
Berlin has been compared to Lydia Davis, Tom Wolfe, Raymond Carver, and Saul Bellow. Tom Wilhelmus explained that "Lucia Berlin's stories are "raw" in the sense that they appear to spring directly from life and contain almost no literary pretensions." He described her style as "declarative and unadorned, casual, sometimes with a bit of self-mocking humor." Lydia Davis, herself often cited as a similar writer, placed Berlin "somewhere in the same arena as Alice Munro, Grace Paley, maybe Tillie Olsen." August Kleinzahler, with whom she exchanged personal letters, noted that Berlin's writing was at times musical, with elements "including the extended jazz solo, with its surges, convolutions, and asides. This is writing of a very high order."

The topic of motherhood appears repeatedly in Berlin's work, for example in the story "Tiger Bites" (1989), where the protagonist travels to Mexico in order to have an abortion and then decides against it.

The story "Carmen" (1996) tells of a Mexican girl giving birth in the United States, but she understands nothing going on around her because she lacks English skills. "Uncontrollable" (1992) portrays a pregnant woman forced by her addict husband to go out into the streets to buy heroin for him.

== Personal life ==
Berlin was married three times and had four sons.

Berlin was plagued by health problems, including double scoliosis. Her crooked spine punctured one of her lungs, and she was never seen without an oxygen tank beside her from 1994 until her death. She retired when her condition grew too severe to work. She was an alcoholic, as were many of her relatives. She later developed lung cancer. She struggled with radiation therapy, which she said felt like having one's bones ground to dust. As her health and finances deteriorated, Berlin moved into a trailer park on the edge of Boulder. Later, she lived in a converted garage behind her son's house outside Los Angeles. The move allowed her to be closer to her sons, and made breathing easier because of Boulder's elevation. Lucia died in her home in Marina del Rey, on her 68th birthday.

== Works and publications ==
=== Bibliography ===
- A Manual for Cleaning Ladies. Illustrations by Michael Myers. Washington, D.C. [i.e. Healdsburg, California]: Zephyrus Image, 1977. OCLC 6148887
- Angels Laundromat: Short Stories. Cover art and illustrations by Michael Shannon Moore. Berkeley, CA: Turtle Island for the Netzahaulcoyotl Historical Society, 1981. ISBN 978-0-913-66639-5 OCLC 7532068
- Legacy. Berkeley, CA: Poltroon Press, 1983. Illustrated by Michael Bradley. OCLC 10869572
- Phantom Pain: Sixteen Stories. Bolinas, CA: Tombouctou Books, 1984. ISBN 978-0-939-18028-8 OCLC 633368020
- Safe & Sound. Berkeley, CA: Poltroon Press, 1988. Illustrated by Frances Butler. ISBN 978-0-918-39505-4 OCLC 123106761
- Homesick: New & Selected Stories. Santa Rosa CA: Black Sparrow Press, 1990. ISBN 978-0-876-85816-5 OCLC 22597395
- So Long: Stories, 1987-1992. Santa Rosa, CA: Black Sparrow Press, 1993. ISBN 978-0-876-85894-3 OCLC 27381091
- Where I Live Now: Stories, 1993-1998. Santa Rosa, CA: Black Sparrow Press, 1999. ISBN 978-1-574-23091-8 OCLC 475160702
- A Manual for Cleaning Women: Selected Stories. Edited by Stephen Emerson. Foreword by Lydia Davis. New York, NY: Farrar, Straus and Giroux, 2015. ISBN 978-0-374-20239-2 OCLC 898433447
- Evening in Paradise: More Stories. Farrar, Straus and Giroux, 2018. ISBN 978-0374279486
- Welcome Home: A Memoir with Selected Photographs and Letters. Farrar, Straus and Giroux, 2018. ISBN 9780374287597

=== In periodicals (posthumous) ===
- Berlin, Lucia. 2005. "Letters to August Kleinzahler." The London Review of Books. Vol. 27, No. 15: pp. 33–34. ISSN 0260-9592 OCLC 99818133
- Berlin, Lucia. 2015. "B.F. and Me." The Paris Review. No. 213: Summer 2015. pp. 269–269. ISSN 0031-2037 OCLC 5858374865

=== Multimedia ===
- Berlin, Lucia, Yasunari Kawabata, and Amy Hempel. Lucia Berlin: Summer 1991. Naropa Institute, 1991. 3 audio cassettes. Audio of two classes held at Naropa Institute in Boulder, Colorado during Summer 1991. Naropa Audio Archive: 20051107, 20051111. OCLC 63682481
- Berlin, Lucia. Lucia Berlin Reading 12 Nov 93 at Lincoln Lecture Hall, Naropa. Naropa Institute, 1993. 1 audio cassette. Lucia Berlin reading at Naropa Institute November 12, 1993. Naropa Audio Archive: 20051208. OCLC 62873090
- Berlin, Lucia, Bobbie Louise Hawkins, Molly Giles, and Lorna Dee Cervantes. W&P Reading Cervantes; Hawkins; Giles, Berlin. Naropa Institute, 1997. 2 audio cassettes. Writing and poetics reading featuring Lorna Dee Cervantes, Bobbie Louise Hawkins, Molly Giles, and Lucia Berlin. Naropa Audio Archive: 20060118, 20060119. OCLC 70077867

=== Other ===
- Berlin, Lucia. Rigorous. Oakland, CA: Mark Berlin, 1992. OCLC 651063912
- Berlin, Lucia. From Luna Nueva. Boulder, CO: Kavyayantra Press at Jack Kerouac School of Disembodied Poetics, November 1993. OCLC 441842670
- Berlin, Lucia. The Moon: There's No Moon Like on a Clear New Mexico Night. Boulder, CO: Kavyayantra Press at Jack Kerouac School of Disembodied Poetics, 1997. OCLC 794174724
