= Minnesota Center for Book Arts =

Book arts studio in the United States

Coordinates: 44°58′31″N 93°15′15″W

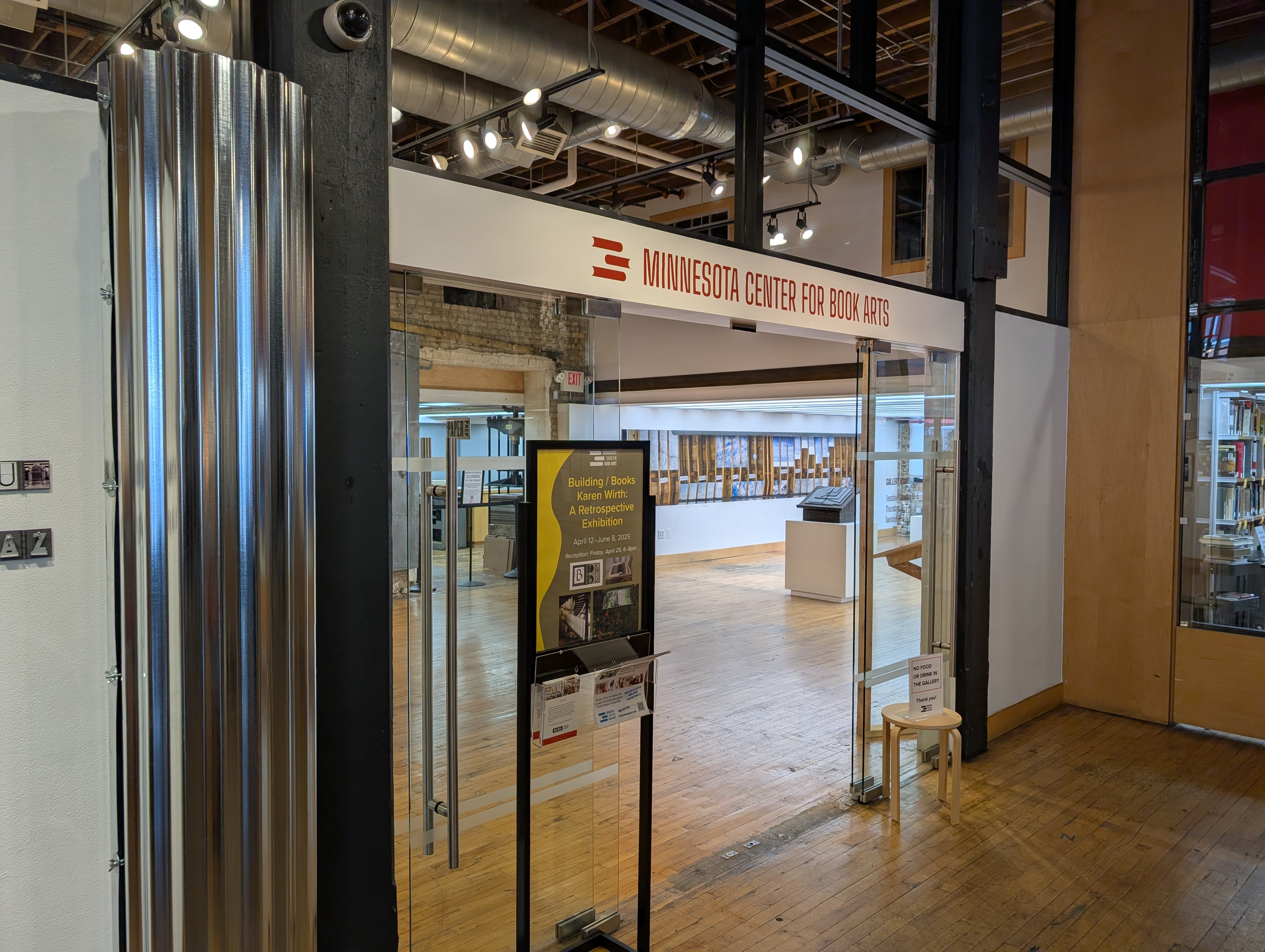
The Minnesota Center for Book Arts

Minnesota Center for Book Arts (MCBA) is the largest and most comprehensive independent nonprofit book arts center in the United States. Located in Minneapolis, Minnesota, MCBA is a nationally recognized leader in the celebration and preservation of traditional crafts, including hand papermaking, letterpress printing and hand bookbinding, as well as the use of these traditional techniques by contemporary artists in creating new artists' books and artwork.

== History ==
MCBA was established in 1983. Two years later, it moved to the first floor of the McKesson building, at 24 North Third Street, in the Warehouse District of Minneapolis. In this space, MCBA established educational, artistic, and community programs to introduce book arts to the public and promote appreciation of artists' books, fine-press publications, broadsides and other artworks created using book art techniques.

In 2000, MCBA joined The Loft Literary Center and Milkweed Editions in establishing Open Book, a center for literary and visual arts, in downtown Minneapolis.

Frances Butler was the first visiting lecturer at the Center and "spoke of book arts in terms of re-defining tradition," challenging the center to adopt a more forward-thinking mission.

== Programs ==
Education programs include workshops in book art disciplines for adults, teens, teachers, youth and families; school field trips; and workshops to equip teachers to incorporate book arts into their classroom curricula.

Artistic programs include critically acclaimed exhibitions; artists’ residencies and competitive fellowships; studio and equipment rental; and an Artists Collective. MCBA also co-sponsors and administers the Minnesota Book Artist Award, presented each year to a Minnesota book artist in recognition of his or her body of work and contributions to the book arts community.

Community programs include participation in numerous public festivals, fairs and events, and free family days at MCBA's studio facilities, designed to provide free art-making opportunities for families and children of all ages.

MCBA's facilities also include The Shop at MCBA, which features works for sale on consignment from book artists across the country and around the globe, and the James and Marilynn Alcott Library and Archives.
