= Open Book Minneapolis =

Book and literary arts center in Minnesota, US

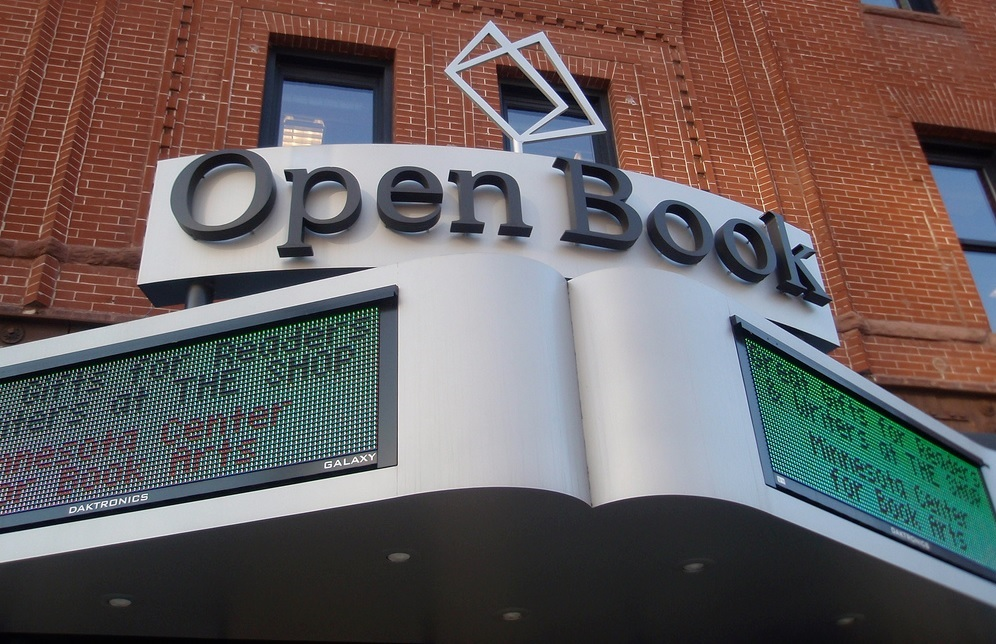
Building front

Open Book is a book and literary arts center in Minneapolis, Minnesota, housing three nonprofit organizations: The Loft Literary Center, Minnesota Center for Book Arts and Milkweed Editions, as well as a coffeeshop. It includes a 50,000 square foot space on four floors. The building has approximately 10,000 visitors a month and includes an Orchestra Hall and a theater.

== History ==
Opened May 21, 2000, Open Book was founded by Linda Myers of The Loft Literary Center, Peggy Korsmo-Kennon of the Minnesota Center for Book Arts and Emilie Buchwald of Milkweed Editions in an effort to create a more permanent home for their respective organisations. It was fully funded by contributions they received from individuals, corporations and foundations and was not funded with government money.

Former Minneapolis Mayor R. T. Rybak described the center as an "important anchor" for creative growth in the Washington Avenue area.

== Awards ==
In 2015, Open Book received a $10,000 MetLife Foundation Innovation Space Award.
