= Emilie Buchwald =

American literary editor and author

Emilie Buchwald is an American literary editor and author. She is the co-founder of the Minneapolis, Minnesota-based nonprofit publisher Milkweed Editions. In 2007, she won the National Book Critics Circle Lifetime Achievement Award in Publishing.

== Early life and education ==
Buchwald was born on September 6, 1935, in Vienna, Austria, to parents Norbert Norton and Marya (Knebel) Bix. After the Kristallnacht, her family emigrated to the United States in 1939. She grew up in New York City and began writing poetry as a child. According to Buchwald, her father was a marvelous story-teller and influenced her interest in writing. She attended Hunter College High School in New York City and Barnard College. She graduated from Barnard College with a Bachelor of Arts in 1957.

In 1954, she married medical student Henry Buchwald, who later became a surgeon. From 1955 to 1957, she worked in editorial positions during the summers off from college, including at TV Guide and Mademoiselle magazine.

In 1960, she obtained a Master of Arts from Columbia University. After, she moved with her husband to Minneapolis for his work. From 1960 to 1968, she was an English instructor at the University of Minnesota, Minneapolis. In 1971, she graduated with a Ph.D. from the University of Minnesota.

== Milkweed Chronicle ==
In 1979, Buchwald and Randy "R.W." Scholes founded a literature and art journal in Minneapolis, naming it Milkweed Chronicle. The first issue was published in 1980 and Buchwald served as the editor for the journal while Scholes was the art director. The journal ran for 21 issues until 1987. It featured local and national writers and artists.

== Publishing ==
In the 1980s, the journal transitioned into a publisher and press called Milkweed Editions. In the 1990s and 2000s, the press published non-fiction books about social issues, as well as fiction and poetry books. After 24 years at the publishing house, Buchwald retired from Milkweed Editions in 2003.

In 2006, Buchwald started Gryphon Press, which she originally incorporated in the late 1980s. It publishes children's books that focus on the humane treatment of animals.

== Selected works ==
- GILDAEN: The Heroic Adventures of a Most Unusual Rabbit (1973) - author
- Floramel and Estaban - author
- The Poet Dreaming in the Artist's House - co-editor (1984)
- Transforming a Rape Culture (1993) - editor
