= Milkweed Editions =

American nonprofit literary publisher

- Founded: 1980
- Founder: Emilie Buchwald and R.W. Scholes
- Successor: Daniel Slager
- Country of origin: United States
- Headquarters location: Minneapolis
- Distribution: Publishers Group West
- Publication types: Books
- Fiction genres: fiction, nonfiction, poetry
- Official website: www.milkweed.org

Milkweed Editions is an independent nonprofit literary publisher that originated from the Milkweed Chronicle literary and arts journal established in Minneapolis in 1979. The journal ceased and the business transitioned to publishing. It releases eighteen to twenty new books each year in the genres of fiction, nonfiction, and poetry. Milkweed Editions annually awards three prizes for poetry: the Lindquist & Vennum Prize for Poetry, the Jake Adam York Prize (in collaboration with Copper Nickel), and they are a partner publisher for the National Poetry Series. In 2016, Milkweed Editions opened an independent bookstore.

== History ==
Milkweed Chronicle was co-founded in 1979 as a literature and art journal by Emilie Buchwald and R.W. Scholes in Minneapolis. Milkweed Chronicle's first issue was published in 1980. Buchwald served as editor and Scholes as art director. The journal ran for 21 issues until 1987. It featured local and national writers and artists.

In the mid-1980s, the publication ceased and the business transitioned to publishing. Milkweed Editions published its first book and ceased publication of the journal. Since this first publication, the press has published more than three hundred and fifty titles.

In 1999, Milkweed combined forces with Minnesota Center for Book Arts and the Loft Literary Center to purchase an old warehouse in downtown Minneapolis to house each organization. They named the warehouse the Open Book.

In 2007, Daniel Slager was named Publisher & CEO of Milkweed Editions. Since his arrival, Slager has focused the press on the publication of fiction, nonfiction, and poetry, and has focused on publishing more work in translation. In 2016, the press opened a bookstore, Milkweed Books.

== Milkweed Prizes ==
The Lindquist & Vennum Prize for Poetry was established in 2011 by Milkweed Editions and the Lindquist & Vennum Foundation. Submissions for this regional prize are accepted only from poets residing in the states of the Upper Midwest. The winner receives a $10,000 cash prize and a publishing contract. Previous winners have included Patricia Kirkpatrick, Rebecca Dunham, Michael Bazzett, Jennifer Willoughby, and Chris Santiago.

In 2017, Milkweed Editions announced the Max Ritvo Poetry Prize, a US$10,000 award supported by the Alan B. Slifka Foundation. Grady Chambers was the Inaugural winner award of this prize, announced December 2017.

== Awards and media recognition ==
Milkweed Editions was the 2021 winner of the AWP Small Press Publisher Award given by the Association of Writers & Writing Programs which "acknowledges the hard work, creativity, and innovation of these presses and journals, and honors their contributions to the literary landscape through their publication of consistently excellent work." The press has been further recognized by media attention in interviews and features, including Literary Hub and Publishers Weekly.
