= Crazy Brave =

Memoir by Joy Harjo

Crazy Brave: A Memoir
- Author: Joy Harjo
- Language: English
- Genres: Poetry, Native American Folklore, Autobiography
- Published: 2012
- Publisher: W. W. Norton & Company
- Publication place: United States
- ISBN: 0393073467

Crazy Brave: a Memoir was written by Joy Harjo, a citizen of the Muscogee (Creek) Nation. Published in 2012, Crazy Brave chronicles Harjo's life, detailing her thoughts, emotions, dreams and memories. Harjo writes of her love for her parents while expressing the hurt she experienced from domestic violence. This book explains the hardships and how she conquered her struggle with writing, music, art. She uses her power of poetry to help convey the emotions that flow through the book.

The book details her personal growth through the lense of her own cultural background as well other tribal cultures. She wrote the book as an outlet to show that everyone's story deserves to be heard, simultaneously bringing her culture to the spotlight.

Harjo wrote a second memoir, titled Poet Warrior, which was published in 2021, also by W.W. Norton.

== Development ==
Harjo combines poetry, Native folklore, and first-person narration to tell her life story. The story begins before her birth, detailing her entrance to this world, and continues through her 20s. The timeline is not linear, and throughout the book Harjo shares experiences and wisdom gained later in her life.

Harjo's interest in music began at a young age, listening to her mother sing. She recounts the memories of her early life with her mother and biological father and their difficult and even abusive marriage. As she grows older her parents separate, and her mother remarries her step father whose abuse is the source of her and her family's trauma.

As a teen, she was enrolled in the Institute of American Indian Arts high school in Santa Fe, New Mexico where she participated in a drama troupe. She studied creative writing, where she found her love for poetry which lead to her first book of poems called The Last Song.

Crazy Brave was written over the span of 14 years. Harjo's younger sibling has said that the violence perpetrated by Harjo's stepdad was extremely downplayed in the memoir.

Joy Harjo uses her memoir to talk about past traumas and abusive father figures.

Joy Harjo sectioned Crazy Brave into four-part, east, north, west, and south.

"But when it came time to write this memoir, Harjo found she resisted telling the story in any way whatsoever."

"Harjo transitions between time and space with delicate ease. It was one of the first things that impressed me about the book."

"In this transcendent memoir, grounded in tribal myth and ancestry, music and poetry, Joy Harjo details her journey to becoming a poet. Born in Oklahoma,-"

Harjo accredits her poem "I Give You Back" from her collection She Had Some Horses with inspiring her to write and publish Crazy Brave. She stated that she originally wanted to start the plot of the book at a much later point in her life, and that the poem gave her the courage to include earlier traumatic parts of her childhood.

=== Poems ===
Joy Harjo was named U.S. poet laureate on June 19, 2019, April 30, 2020, and again for the third time on November 19, 2020.

The book contains several poems that had been published prior to the publication of Crazy Brave, though not all of them have their titles listed.

- "This Is My Heart"
- "Rabbit is Up to Tricks"
- "This Morning I Pray for My Enemies"
- "Eagle Poem"
- "I Give You Back"

== Awards ==
- Crazy Brave won the 2013 PEN USA Literary Award for Creative Non-Fiction
- Harjo won the 2013 American Book award for Crazy Brave

== Reviews ==
Indian Country writes, "Dances into hard truth. [Harjo's] fine crafting of words and deft braiding of mythic visions throughout the text almost—almost—draw you past the truth of her personal story. That story is harsh and scary, mystical and loving, and, ultimately, triumphant and healing."

Elizabeth Wilkinson in a StarTribune article states, "Harjo's poetry, woven throughout, makes this memoir a must-read for her fans and a fascinating door into her world for those new to her work."

Rebecca Steinitz in a Boston Globe review writes, "A saga about the survival of spirituality and creativity in the face of generations of racism, dispossession, and familial dysfunction…Fantastic, terrible and beautiful."

Jon M. Sweeney in a Spirituality and Practice review states, "She respects mystery and practices compassion. There are no accidents in her world. She listens for the spirit that inspires and gives breath to all things."
