= Sandra Benitez =

American novelist

- Born: Sandra Jeanette Ables; March 26, 1941 Washington, D.C., U.S.
- Died: July 25, 2024 (aged 83) Minneapolis, MN, U.S.
- Occupation: Novelist
- Language: English
- Education: Northeast Missouri State University (BS, MA)
- Notable awards: Hispanic Heritage Award 2004; USA Gund Fellow 2006; American Book Award 1998 Bitter Grounds

Sandra Benitez (March 26, 1941 - July 25, 2024) was an American novelist.

== Life ==
Sandra Jeanette Ables, better known by her pen name Sandra Benitez (Benitez being her Puerto Rican mother's maiden name) spent the first fourteen years of her childhood in El Salvador while her father was based there as a diplomat. At the urging of her father, she attended high school in rural, northern Missouri with her paternal grandparents and subsequently graduated with a B.S. (1962) from Northeast Missouri State University. Later she returned to her alma mater to earn an M.A. (1974)

In 1975 she moved with her then husband and two sons to the suburbs of Minneapolis, Minnesota where she would remain for the rest of her life. After teaching and working as a translator she began seriously writing and in 1993, her first novel, A Place Where The Sea Remembers, was published by Coffee House Press.

Benítez has received a Loft-McKnight Award of Distinction for fiction, a Jerome Foundation Travel and Study Grant as well as a 1992 Minnesota State Arts Board Fellowship. She was the Hispanic Mentor for The Loft Inroads Program from 1989 to 1992. In 1997 she was selected as the University of Minnesota Edelstein-Keller Distinguished Writer in Residence. In 1998 she did the Writers Community Residency for the YMCA National Writer’s Voice program. In the spring of 2001 she held the Knapp Chair in Humanities as Associate Professor of Creative Writing at the University of San Diego.

== Awards ==
- 1998 American Book Award, for Bitter Grounds
- 2004 Hispanic Heritage Award for Literature.
- 2006 United States Artists Gund Fellow

== Works ==
- A Place Where the Sea Remembers. Simon & Schuster. 1993. ISBN 978-0-671-89267-8.
- Bitter Grounds. Macmillan. 1998. ISBN 978-0-312-19541-0.
- The Weight of All Things. Hyperion. 2002. ISBN 978-0-7868-8703-3. "Sandra Benitez."
- Night of the Radishes. Hyperion. January 2004. ISBN 978-0-7868-6400-3.
- Bag Lady: A Memoir, The Triumphant True Story of Loss, Illness and Recovery. Benitez Books. 2005. ISBN 978-0-9774848-0-5.

=== Anthologies ===
- Mickey Pearlman, ed. (15 October 1997). "Home Views". A Place Called Home: Twenty Writing Women Remember. St. Martin’s Press. ISBN 978-0-312-17443-9.
- Marilyn Kallet, Judith Ortiz Cofer, ed. (1999). "Fire, Wax, Smoke". Sleeping with One Eye Open. University of Georgia Press. ISBN 978-0-8203-2153-0.
