= Ivan Sandrof Lifetime Achievement Award =

Annual American literary award

The Ivan Sandrof Lifetime Achievement Award, established in 1981, is an annual literary award presented by the National Book Critics Circle in honor of its first president, Ivan Sandrof. The award "is given to a person or institution who has, over time, made significant contributions to book culture." The Sandrof Award has also been presented as the "Ivan Sandrof Award for Lifetime Achievement in Publishing" and the "Ivan Sandrof Award, Contribution to American Arts & Letters."

== Recipients ==
Sandrof Award winners
Year	Recipient	Ref.
1982	Leslie A. Marchand	
1983	none	
1984	The Library of America	
1985	none	
1986	none	
1987	Robert Giroux	
1988	none	
1989	James Laughlin	
1990	Donald Keene	
1991	none	
1992	Gregory Rabassa	
1993	none	
1994	William Maxwell	
1995	Alfred Kazin	
1995	Elizabeth Hardwick	
1996	Albert Murray	
1997	Leslie Fiedler	
1998	none	
1999	Lawrence Ferlinghetti	
1999	Pauline Kael	
2000	Barney Rosset	
2001	Jason Epstein	
2002	Richard Howard	
2003	Studs Terkel	
2004	Louis D. Rubin, Jr.	
2005	Bill Henderson	
2006	John Leonard	
2007	Emilie Buchwald	
2008	PEN American Center	
2009	Joyce Carol Oates	
2010	Dalkey Archive Press	
2011	Robert Silvers	
2012	Sandra Gilbert	
2012	Susan Gubar	
2013	Rolando Hinojosa-Smith	
2014	Toni Morrison	
2015	Wendell Berry	
2016	Margaret Atwood	
2017	John McPhee	
2018	Arte Público Press	
2019	Naomi Shihab Nye	
2020	The Feminist Press at the City University of New York	
2021	Percival Everett	
2022	Joy Harjo	
2023	Judy Blume	
2024	Sandra Cisneros	
2025	Frances FitzGerald	

In 2021, the Sandrof Award was divided into two separate awards. The Sandrof Award continued to be given to a person for a contribution to book culture, while the Toni Morrison Achievement Award was given to an organization that met the same criteria.

The winners to date:

- 2021 Cave Canem
- 2022 City Lights
- 2023 American Library Association
- 2024 Third World Press

== See also ==
- John Leonard Prize
- National Book Critics Circle Awards
- National Book Critics Circle Award for Biography
- National Book Critics Circle Award for Criticism
- National Book Critics Circle Award for Fiction
- National Book Critics Circle Award for Memoir and Autobiography
- National Book Critics Circle Award for Nonfiction
- National Book Critics Circle Award for Poetry
- Nona Balakian Citation for Excellence in Reviewing
