= Lois Harjo Ball =

Native American painter

- Born: November 24, 1906; Okmulgee, Oklahoma
- Died: 25 June 1982 (aged 75); Okmulgee, Oklahoma
- Citizenship: Muscogee Nation, American
- Education: Oklahoma City University, Stephens College
- Occupation: painter

Lois Harjo Ball (1906–1982) was a Native American painter, basket maker, and ceramic artist from Okmulgee, Oklahoma, and a citizen of the Muscogee Nation.

== Boagraphy ==
Ball was born in Okmulgee, Oklahoma on November 24, 1906, the daughter of Henry Marsey Harjo and Katie Monahwee. She was a granddaughter of Muscogee chief Menawa. Ball graduated from Okmulgee High School in 1926. She attended Stephens College and Oklahoma City University. She died on June 25, 1982 in Okmulgee, Oklahoma.

== Art career ==
Ball painted for her entire adult life. She supported native art and encouraged others to learn about their heritage. Her works are in the collections of institutions including the Creek Council House and Museum in Okmulgee.

== Legacy ==
In particular, Ball was a strong influence on her grand-niece Joy Harjo, who was later a United States Poet Laureate. Joy Harjo dedicated her 1983 book She Had Some Horses to her great-aunt Lois.

A scholarship for Muscogee Nation students of fine arts, the Naomi & Lois Harjo Scholarship, is named in honor of Ball.
