= The Loft Literary Center =

American non-profit organization

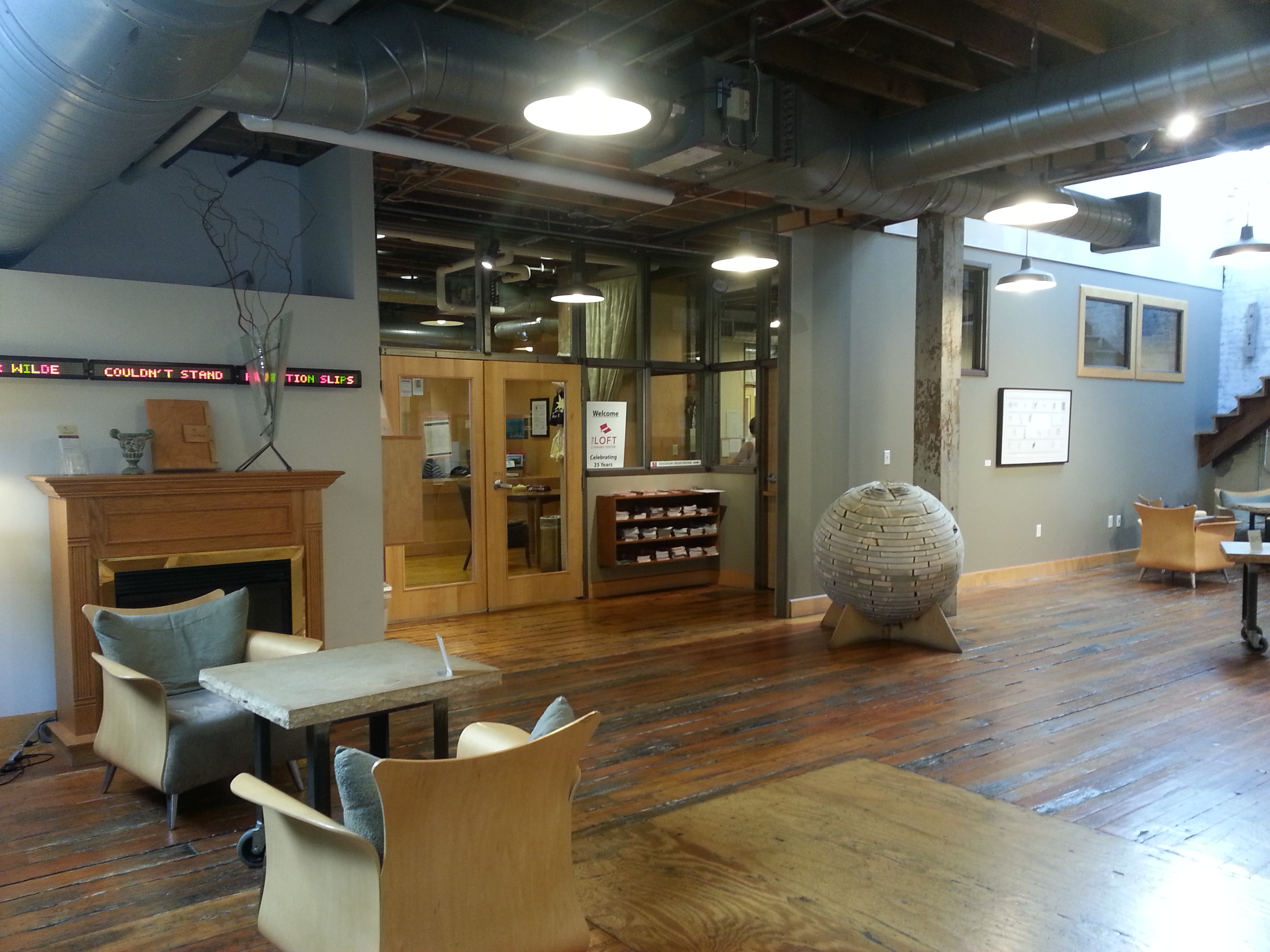
Entrance to the Loft in Open Book's Cowles Literary Commons

The Loft Literary Center is a non-profit literary organization located in Minneapolis, Minnesota incorporated in 1975. The Loft is a large and comprehensive independent literary center which offers a variety of writing classes, conferences, grants, readings, writers' studios and other services to both established and emerging writers.

Each year, the Loft hosts more than 400 writers and performers in readings and dialogues that draw more than 12,000 people and collaborates with at least 30 local and national organizations. Additionally, the Loft claims to have more than 170,000 unique visitors through digital resources and online writing classes.

== History ==
=== Inception ===
Incorporated in 1975, the Loft started in a bookstore when a group of writers decided to offer classes and readings in the upstairs loft. Following a series of successful events held at Rusoff & Co. Book Dealers in Dinkytown, Minnesota, bookstore owner Marly Rusoff and writers Jim Moore, Patricia Hampl, Phebe Hanson, and Michael Dennis Browne formed a 'poets' club' with support from a fundraising party emceed by Garrison Keillor. This 'poets' club' eventually became known as 'The Loft' and in 1975 filed for nonprofit status and received a grant from the Minnesota State Arts Board to sponsor several writing workshops. Over the next two years, the Loft hosted several benefit readings that featured poets such as Allen Ginsberg, Robert Bly, and Etheridge Knight.

=== Continued growth ===
Over the years, the Loft grew organically as a community-based non-profit to become one of the nation's leading independent literary centers. With support from the Jerome Foundation the Loft launched the Mentor Series in 1980, bringing together nationally prominent authors with promising local writers. The first year featured New York Times bestselling author Marge Piercy and Pulitzer Prize-winning poets Philip Levine and Galway Kinnell. Other programs launched in the organization's first decade include the McKnight Artist Fellowship in Creative Writing (1982), The Loft Scholarship Fund (1984), and a radio program in collaboration with Minnesota Public Radio (1985). In 1990, Loft membership passed the 2,000 mark, and in 1996 Loft awarded more than $160,000 in grants to writers.

=== Social engagement ===
The Loft initiated the Amnesty Action Project in 1988, which coordinated letter-writing campaigns on behalf of imprisoned writers as identified by Amnesty International. Prominent Malawian poet Jack Mapanje was the first, followed by political prisoners Jaki Seroke, Zwelakhe Sisulu, Nguyễn Chí Thiện, Dai Qing, Lee San-ha, and Bligesu Erenus. The following year, WCCO anchor Dave Moore read from Salman Rushdie's Satanic Verses at the Loft in protest of Ayatollah Khomeini's sentence of death on Rushdie. The reading was also a response from the Twin Cities Artistic Community Ad Hoc Committee in Protest of Censorship and Intimidation. In 1993, the Loft hosted a week-long series of events celebrating freedom of expression that coincided with National Banned Books Week. The events included a dialogue with Kathy Acker, Amiri Baraka, and Nat Hentoff; a reading and forum with Lorrie Moore and Mona Simpson; free speech read-ins; and performance art with J. Otis Powell and Patrick Scully at the Rogue Nightclub.

=== 2000–present ===
In 1999, the Loft joined with Minnesota Center for Book Arts and publisher Milkweed Editions to build the nonprofit literary and book arts center Open Book, which opened in May 2000 and is the current home of the Loft. This move was followed by the launch of the Loft Equilibrium Spoken Word Series in 2002, which was recognized with the Minnesota Nonprofit Anti-Racism Initiative Award.

In 2010, the Loft celebrated its 35th anniversary with the publication release of Views from the Loft: A Portable Writer's Workshop and the launch of its online education program.

The Loft now has an annual budget of over $2.4 million, and through contracts, awards, and grants pays writers more than $400,000 each year. The Loft annually serves thousands of writers by offering hundreds of classes, numerous fellowships, readings from award-winning authors, and literary resources such as a small library, writing studios, and a book club room. The Loft has also launched two major annual events, Wordplay—an annual book festival for readers, and Wordsmith—an annual conference for writers.

== Collaborators ==
Thousands of writers both established and emerging have read, taught, mentored, and judged contests at the Loft since 1975. Their ranks include Margaret Atwood, Charles Baxter, Sandra Benitez, Robert Bly, Billy Collins, Bernard Cooper, Toi Derricotte, Junot Díaz, Kate DiCamillo, Rita Dove, Louise Erdrich, Vince Flynn, Nikki Giovanni, Patricia Hampl, John Irving, Garrison Keillor, Stanley Kunitz, Mary Oliver, Michael Ondaatje, Tracy K. Smith, Patricia Smith, Quincy Troupe, and Li-Young Lee, among others.

== Records ==
Records of the Loft Literary Center are housed at the Minnesota Historical Society and available for research use. They include bylaws and statements of purpose, minutes, correspondence, financial information, annual reports, information on classes and readings, class proposals, and membership data, among other files.
