= Joel Daniel Phillips =

- Born: 25 July 1989 (age 37); Seattle, Washington, United States
- Known for: Drawing, Portraiture. Artist
- Movement: Contemporary Realism, Social Practice

Joel Daniel Phillips is an American artist and illustrator known for realist portraiture, large-scale drawings, and work examining historical memory and representation. His work has been exhibited at the National Portrait Gallery, Philbrook Museum of Art, and other institutions around the globe. He co-founded Lit Escalates with novelist Pierce Brown and has created illustrations associated with books by Brown, Joe Abercrombie, and Matt Dinniman.

== Early life ==
Phillips was born July 25, 1989, and grew up in Redmond, Washington. He received a BFA from Westmont College in Santa Barbara, California, in 2011, and worked as a graphic designer before finding his first fine art representation and becoming a full-time fine artist.

== Career ==
=== Early work ===
Between 2011 and 2017 Phillips drew more than 100 life-size portraits of his neighbors in San Francisco. For Phillips, the focus on fringe populations represented “a visual record of my striving to recognize unknown and unnoticed individuals through the tip of my pencil.”

Phillips was the third-place winner of the Smithsonian National Portrait Gallery's Outwin Boochever Portrait Competition in 2016. The winning portrait titled “Eugene #4” was of a gentleman he met on the corner of Sixth and Mission Streets in San Francisco, where Phillips lived from 2011 to 2016.

=== Later work ===
In 2017, Phillips moved to Tulsa, Oklahoma to participate in the Tulsa Artist Fellowship. With this move, Phillips' work expanded to explore questions behind how and why the neighborhoods his portraits came from became what they are today. These works, depicting a range of historical material, are “a conscious re-examination of artistic culpability, historic ownership, and the hollowness of Western romanticization” and have been described as “seductive and terrifying."

In 2020 Phillips received an Artist Integration Grant from the Tulsa Artist Fellowship to commission a series of poems in response to his "Killing the Negative" drawings. This grant enabled the project to expand from a series of drawings and paintings by Phillips to include prose responses by some of the leading voices in contemporary American poetry, including noted poet, historian and educator Quraysh Ali Lansana, U.S. Poet Laureate Joy Harjo, North Carolina Poet Laureate Jaki Shelton Green and others. The works are a response to a subset of the Farm Security Administration’s (FSA) foundational commissioned photographs of the Great Depression. These images are, of course, well known, and images like “Migrant Mother” by Dorothea Lange have become some of the most recognizable and important images in the American photographic lexicon. Less known, however, is the process by which these images were selected for publication: Roy Stryker was the head of the FSA, and for the first 4 years of the project, images he deemed unworthy were “killed” by punching a hole in the original negative.

These collaborative works have been the subject of gallery exhibitions in New York City, Los Angeles and Oslo, Norway. The project has been received to significant acclaim, and works from this series have been acquired by the Crocker Art Museum, Philbrook Museum of Art and 21c Museum Hotels. The project was published as Killing the Negative: A Conversation in Art & Verse by Left Field Books in 2023. Philbrook Museum of Art presented an exhibition of the same name from February 21 to May 24, 2026. ExhibitsUSA subsequently listed an adaptation of the Philbrook exhibition for national touring; as of October 2026, its listing described the exhibition as “Touring Soon, Bookings Available.”

=== Smithsonian Portrait Acquisition ===
In 2025, the Smithsonian National Portrait Gallery acquired Phillips’s portrait of poet and musician Joy Harjo. The portrait was included in the museum’s Portrait of a Nation: 2025 Honorees presentation.

=== Illustration and Publishing ===
Phillips co-founded Lit Escalates with author Pierce Brown. The company produces officially licensed literary collectibles, illustrated editions and author-related events. Phillips has created artwork connected to Brown’s Red Rising series, Joe Abercrombie’s First Law books and Matt Dinniman’s Dungeon Crawler Carl series. His work has included maps, heraldic designs, book-cover illustrations and collectible art.

== Exhibitions ==
Phillips’ work has been exhibited at galleries and institutions around the world, including the Smithsonian National Portrait Gallery, Tacoma Art Museum, The Art Museum of South Texas, Fort Wayne Museum of Art, Mesa Contemporary Arts Center, Ackland Art Museum, Gilcrease Museum and the Philbrook Museum of Art. His work can be found in the public collections at the Denver Art Museum, Gilcrease Museum, West Collection and the Fort Wayne Museum of Art. Phillips' work has been selected for the Outwin Boochever Portrait Competition at the Smithsonian National Portrait Gallery for the past three concurrent exhibitions (2016, 2019 and 2022), at which he received 3rd prize in 2016 and Honorable Mention in 2022.

In 2019 Phillips had his first solo museum exhibitions with a show at Philbrook Museum of Art in February and a show at the Fort Wayne Museum of Art in March.

In 2026, Philbrook Museum of Art presented Killing the Negative: A Conversation in Art & Verse (February 21–May 24). The exhibition traveled to the Fort Wayne Musuem of Art in October of the same year. An adaptation of the exhibition is also currently touring the United States through ExhibitsUSA.

== Published work ==
- Phillips, Joel Daniel (2018). No Regrets in Life. United States: Paragon Press. ISBN 9781732798014.
- Phillips, Joel Daniel, (2023) and collaborators. Killing the Negative: A Conversation in Art & Verse. United States: Left Field Books. ISBN 9781959567011.

== Public collections ==
- Smithsonian National Portrait Gallery
- Denver Art Museum
- Philbrook Museum of Art
- Ackland Art Museum
- Crocker Art Museum
- 21c Museum Hotels
- Gilcrease Museum
- Fort Wayne Museum of Art
- West Collection
