= Joy Harjo =

American poet laureate (born 1951)

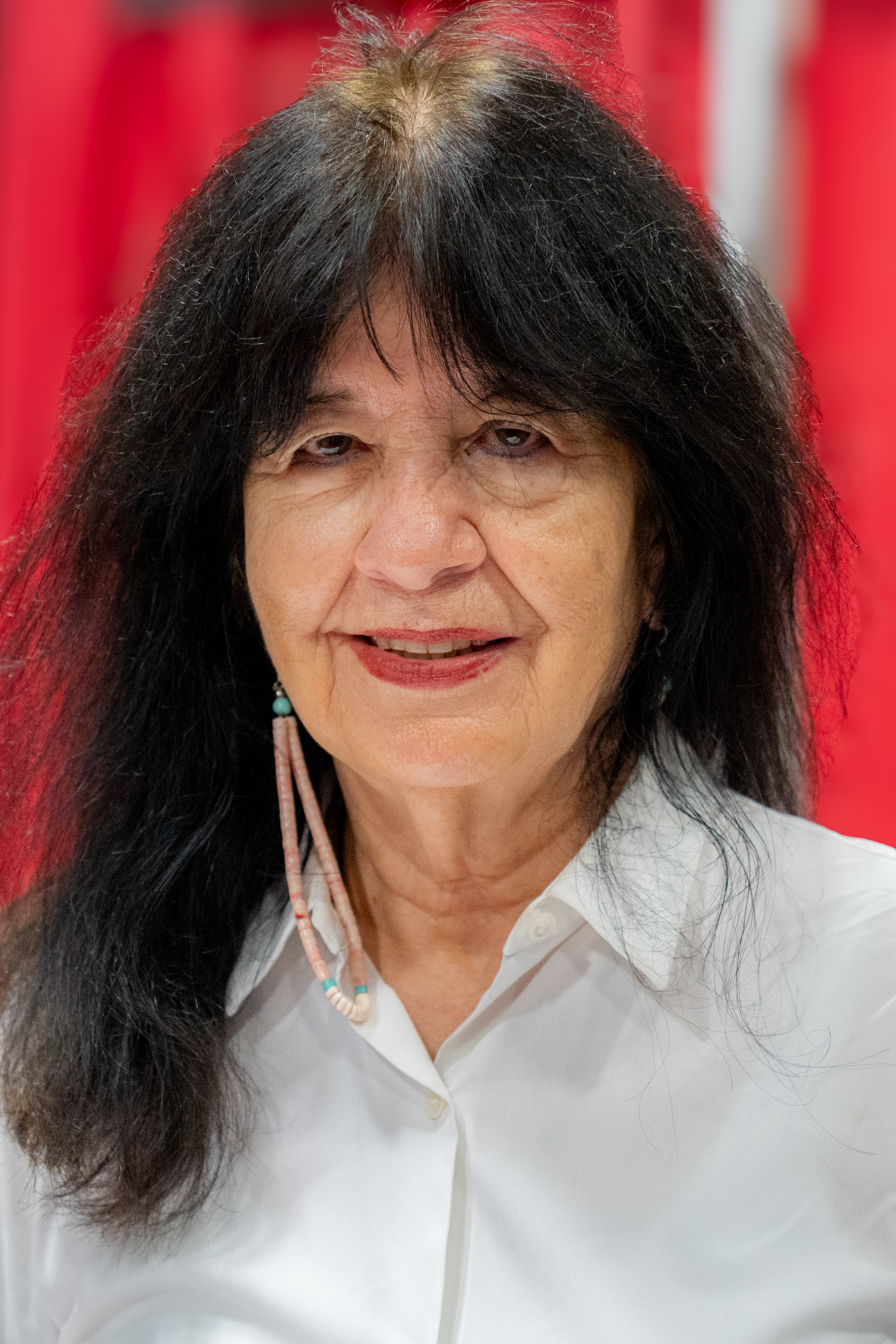
- Harjo at the National Book Festival 2025
- Born: May 9, 1951 (age 75); Tulsa, Oklahoma, U.S.
- Education: University of New Mexico (BA); University of Iowa (MFA)
- Occupations: Author, poet, performer, educator, United States Poet Laureate
- Writing career
- Pen name: Joy Harjo-Sapulpa
- Genres: Poetry, non-fiction, fiction
- Movement: Native American Renaissance

United States Poet Laureate
- In office 2019–2022
- Preceded by: Tracy K. Smith
- Succeeded by: Ada Limón

Joy Harjo (/ˈhɑːrdʒoʊ/ HAR-joh; born May 9, 1951) is an American poet, musician, playwright, and author. She served as the 23rd United States poet laureate from 2019 to 2022, the first Native American to hold that honor. She was also only the second Poet Laureate Consultant in Poetry to have served three terms (after Robert Pinsky).

Harjo is a seventh-generation descendant of Monahwee (also known as Menawa) of the Muscogee people. Additionally, Harjo is a citizen of the Muscogee Nation (Este Mvskokvlke) and belongs to Oce Vpofv (Hickory Ground). She is a major figure in the second wave of the Native American literary renaissance of the late 20th century. She studied at the Institute of American Indian Arts, completed her undergraduate degree at University of New Mexico in 1976, and earned an MFA degree at the University of Iowa in its creative writing program.

Harjo is the author of twelve books of poetry, including her most recent, Cloud Runner (2026), Weaving Sundown in a Scarlet Light, which won the Yale Bollingen Prize, An American Sunrise, which won a 2020 Oklahoma Book Award, and Conflict Resolution for Holy Beings, which was shortlisted for the Griffin Prize and named a Notable Book of the Year by the American Library Association.

In addition to poetry, Harjo has published several award-winning children’s books, including her most recent, Gathering the Light (2026), Remember, which received a 2024 American Indian Youth Literature Honor Award, and For a Girl Becoming, which was named an Honor Book by the American Library Association and won the Claudia Lewis Award for Younger Readers.

Harjo is also the author of two memoirs: Crazy Brave: A Memoir (2012), awarded the PEN USA Literary Award and the American Book Award, and the highly acclaimed Poet Warrior: A Memoir (2021). A book of short essays, Girl Warrior: On Coming of Age was released Fall of 2025. Harjo has edited several anthologies, including When the Light of the World was Subdued, Our Songs Came Through—A Norton Anthology of Native Nations Poetry.

As a musician and performer, Harjo has produced eight award-winning music albums, including Winding Through the Milky Way, for which she was awarded a NAMMY for Best Female Artist of the Year. Her latest album, Insomnia and Seven Steps to Grace, produced with esperanza spaulding, was released from Smithsonian Folkways Recordings in 2026. Her musical plays include her one-woman show, “Wings of Night Sky, Wings of Morning Light,” and “We Were There When Jazz Was Invented,” which premiered in 2025. Harjo performs nationally and internationally with her saxophone and flute, solo and with others.

Throughout her career, Harjo taught in numerous United States universities, including the University of New Mexico, UCLA, and the University of Tennessee. She currently holds the Ruth Yellowhawk Fellowship from the Kettering Foundation and serves as Artist-in-Residence for the Bob Dylan Center in Tulsa, Oklahoma, where she lives.

She is the recipient of the 2024 Frost Medal from the Poetry Society of America, the 2023 Bollingen Prize, the 2023 Harper Lee Award, the 2023 Ivan Sandrof Lifetime Achievement Award from the National Book Critics Circle, the 2022 Lifetime Achievement Award from Americans for the Arts, a 2022 Leadership Award from the Academy of American Poets, a 2019 Jackson Prize from Poets & Writers, the 2017 Ruth Lilly Poetry Prize, the Academy of American Poets Wallace Stevens Award, two fellowships from the National Endowment for the Arts, a Guggenheim Fellowship, and a Tulsa Artist Fellowship, among other honors.

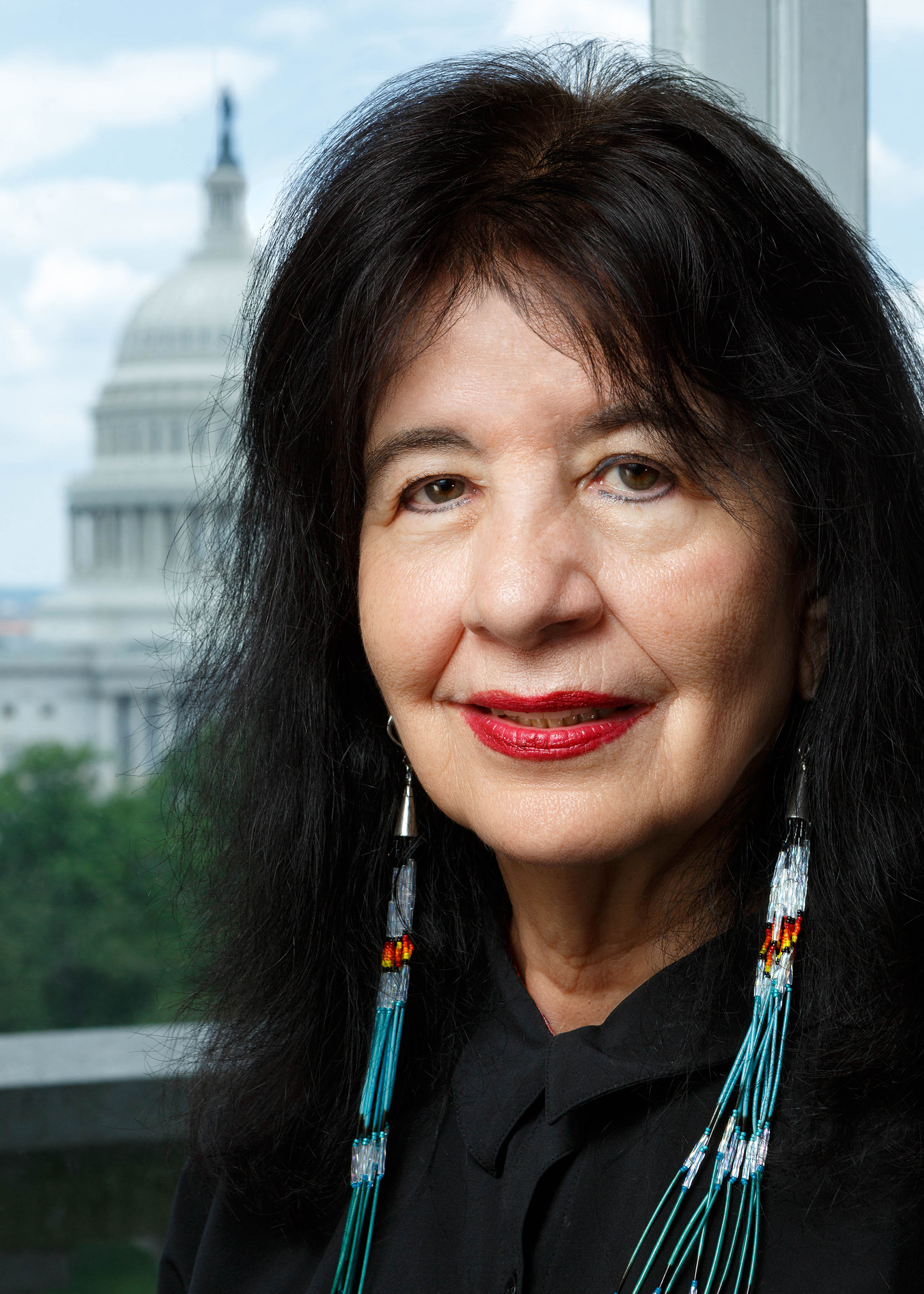
Harjo at the Library of Congress, 2019

In 2019, she was elected a chancellor of the Academy of American Poets and has since been inducted into the Oklahoma Hall of Fame, the National Women's Hall of Fame, and the Native American Hall of Fame. She was also designated the 14th Oklahoma Cultural Treasure at the 44th Oklahoma Governor's Arts Awards. Harjo founded For Girls Becoming, an art mentorship program for young Mvskoke women, and served as a founding board member and chair of the Native Arts and Cultures Foundation.

Her signature project as U.S. Poet Laureate was called Living Nations, Living Words: A Map of First Peoples Poetry; it focused on "mapping the U.S. with Native Nations poets and poems".

== Early life and education ==
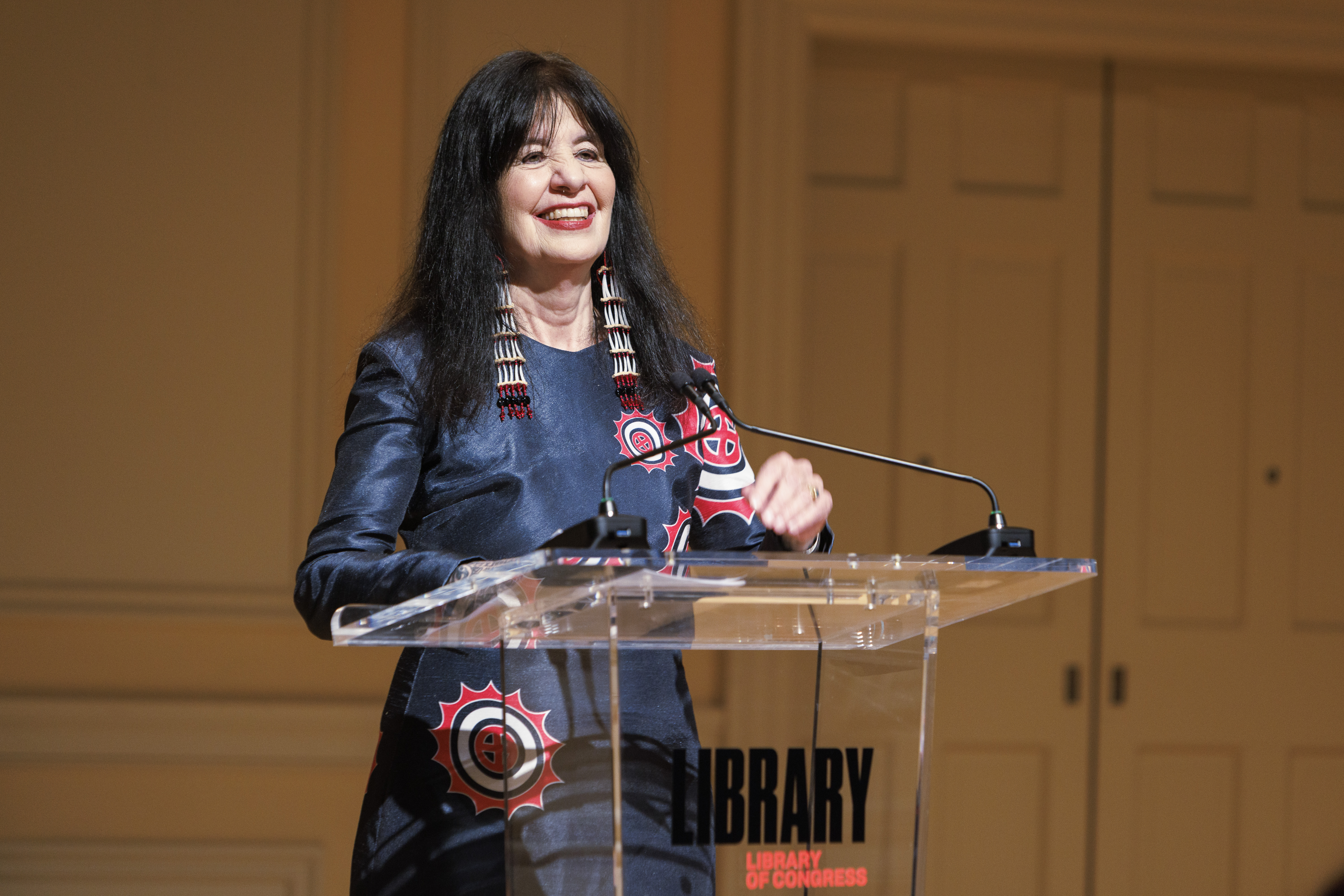
Harjo at the Library of Congress, 2022

Harjo was born on May 9, 1951, in Tulsa, Oklahoma. Her father, Allen W. Foster, was an enrolled citizen of the Muscogee Nation. Her mother was Wynema Baker Foster of Arkansas, who was of Irish, French, and Cherokee Nation descent. Harjo has stated that her mother and her maternal grandmother were not enrolled. Harjo is an enrolled citizen of the Muscogee Nation. Harjo's interest in the arts began fairly early. Her work is heavily inspired by the creativity of her mother, aunts, and grandmother, as well as her culture. Her first poem was written when she was in eighth grade.

At the age of 16, Harjo attended the Institute of American Indian Arts, which at the time was a Bureau of Indian Affairs boarding school, in Santa Fe, New Mexico. Harjo loved painting and found that it gave her a way to express herself. Harjo was inspired by her great-aunt, Lois Harjo Ball, who was a painter.

Harjo enrolled as a pre-med student the University of New Mexico. She changed her major to art after her first year. During her last year, she switched to creative writing, as she was inspired by different Native American writers including Simon J. Ortiz and Leslie Marmon Silko. Her first book of poems, called The Last Song, was published in 1975. Harjo earned her Master of Fine Arts degree in creative writing from the University of Iowa in 1978. She also took filmmaking classes at the Anthropology Film Center in Santa Fe, New Mexico.

== Career ==
Harjo taught at the Institute of American Indian Arts from 1978 to 1979 and 1983 to 1984. She taught at Arizona State University from 1980 to 1981, the University of Colorado from 1985 to 1988, the University of Arizona from 1988 to 1990, the University of New Mexico from 1991 to 1997 and 2005 to 2010, the University of California Los Angeles in 1998 and from 2001 to 2005, the University of Southern Maine's Stonecoast Low Residency MFA Program from 2011 to 2012, the University of Illinois Urbana-Champaign from 2013 to 2016, and the University of Tennessee from 2016 to 2018. Her students at the University of New Mexico included future congressional representative and Secretary of the Interior Deb Haaland.

Harjo has played alto saxophone with her band Poetic Justice, edited literary journals and anthologies, and written screenplays, plays, and children's books. Harjo performs with her saxophone and flutes, both solo and with players she calls the Arrow Dynamics Band.

In 1995, Harjo received the Lifetime Achievement Award from the Native Writers' Circle of the Americas. In 2002, Harjo received the PEN Beyond Margins Award for A Map to the Next World: Poetry and Tales.

In 2008, she served as a founding member of the board of directors for the Native Arts and Cultures Foundation, for which she also served as board chair.

Harjo joined the faculty of the American Indian Studies Program at the University of Illinois Urbana-Champaign in January 2013. In 2016, Harjo was appointed to the Chair of Excellence in the Department of English at the University of Tennessee.

In 2018, Harjo was awarded a Tulsa Artist Fellowship.

In 2019, Harjo was named the United States Poet Laureate. She was the first Native American to be so appointed. She was also the second United States Poet Laureate to serve three terms.

In 2019, Harjo was appointed to the Board of Chancellors of the Academy of American Poets. In 2022, Harjo was appointed as the first artist-in-residence for the Bob Dylan Center in Tulsa, Oklahoma.

In 2023, Harjo was awarded Yale University's Bollingen Prize.

Harjo has been inducted into the National Women's Hall of Fame, National Native American Hall of Fame, Oklahoma Hall of Fame, American Philosophical Society, American Academy of Arts and Sciences, and American Academy of Arts and Letters.

=== Literature and performance ===
Harjo has written numerous works of poetry, books, and plays. Harjo's works often include themes such as defining the self, the arts, and social justice.

Harjo often uses Native American oral history and believes that "written text is, for [her], fixed orality". Her use of the oral tradition is prevalent through her various literature readings and musical performances. Her methods of continuing oral tradition include storytelling, singing, and voice inflection in order to captivate the attention of her audiences. While reading poetry, she claims that "[she] starts not even with an image but a sound".

Her first memoir, Crazy Brave, was awarded the PEN USA Literary Award in Creative Non Fiction and the American Book Award, and her second, Poet Warrior, was released from W.W. Norton in fall 2021.

She has published three children's books, The Good Luck Cat, For a Girl Becoming, and Remember; a collaboration with photographer/astronomer Stephen Strom; three anthologies of writing by North American Indigenous writers; several screenplays and collections of prose interviews and essays; and three plays, including Wings of Night Sky, Wings of Morning Light, which she toured as a one-woman show and which was published by Wesleyan Press.

Harjo is executive editor of the anthology When the Light of the World was Subdued, Our Songs Came Through: A Norton Anthology of Native Nations Poetry and the editor of Living Nations, Living Words: An Anthology of First Peoples Poetry, the companion anthology to her signature Poet Laureate project featuring a sampling of work by 47 Native American poets through an interactive ArcGIS story map and a Library of Congress audio collection.

=== Poetry ===
She began writing poetry at twenty-two, and released her first book of poems called The Last Song, which consisted of nine of her poems and started her career in writing. Harjo's third collection, She Had Some Horses, focused on animals important to Indigenous cultures, particularly horses. Harjo has authored ten books of poetry, including An American Sunrise (2019), which was a 2020 Oklahoma Book Award winner; Conflict Resolution for Holy Beings (2015), which was shortlisted for the Griffin Poetry Prize and named a Notable Book by the American Library Association; and In Mad Love and War (1990), which received an American Book Award and the Delmore Schwartz Memorial Award. Her collection Weaving Sundown in a Scarlet Light (W. W. Norton & Company, 2022) celebrates the previous 50 years of writing poetry since her first publication.

Harjo's awards for poetry include a 2024 Frost Medal, the 2022 Ivan Sandrof Lifetime Achievement Award, the Ruth Lilly Poetry Prize, the Academy of American Poets Wallace Stevens Award, the New Mexico Governor's Award for Excellence in the Arts, a PEN USA Literary Award, the Lila Wallace-Reader's Digest Fund Writers' Award, the Poets & Writers Jackson Poetry Prize, a Rasmuson US Artist Fellowship, two NEA fellowships, and a Guggenheim Fellowship. Her poetry is included on a plaque on LUCY, a NASA spacecraft launched in Fall 2021 and the first reconnaissance of the Jupiter Trojans.

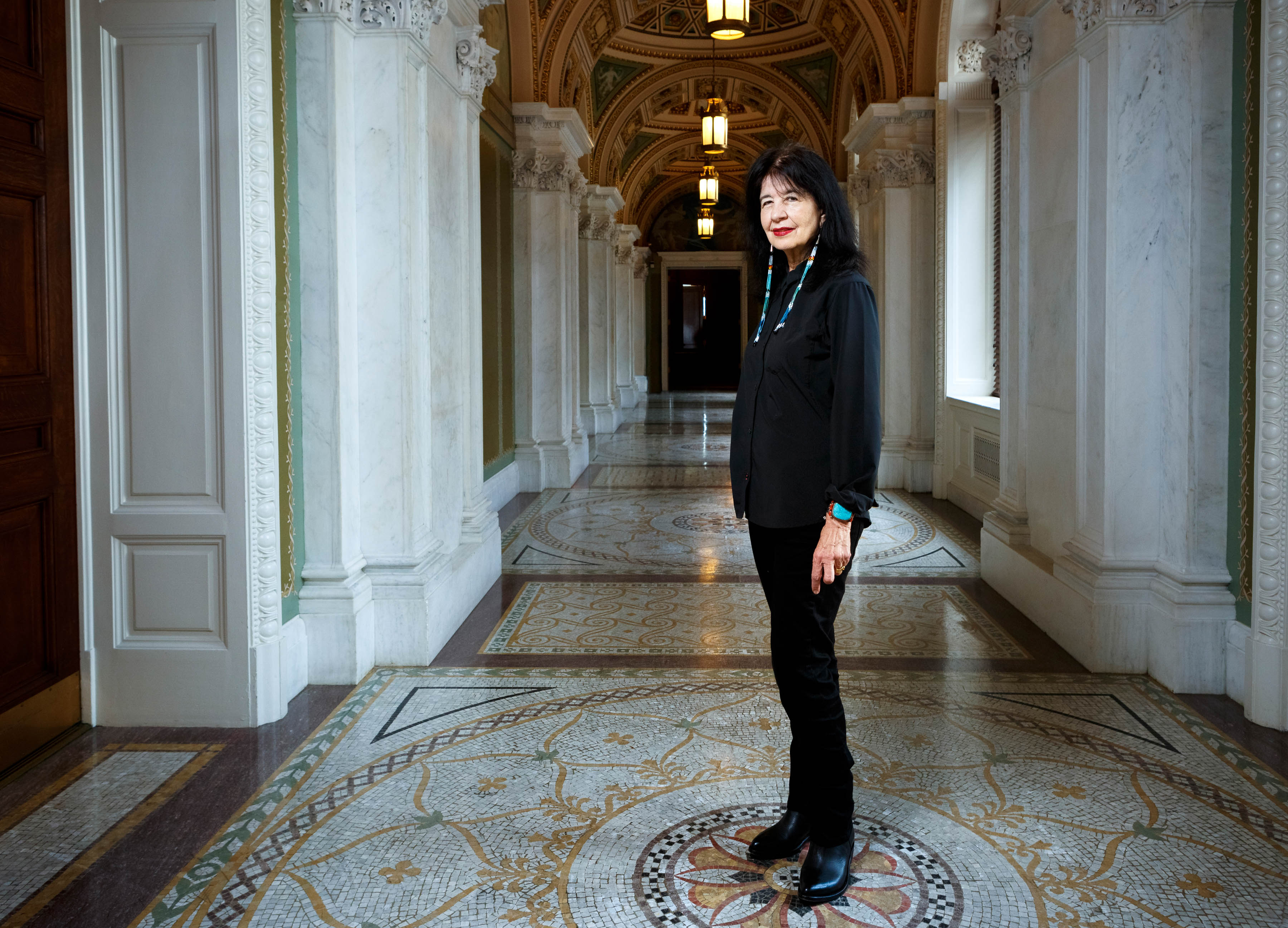
Harjo photographed by the Library of Congress in 2019, upon her nomination as Poet Laureate

=== Music ===
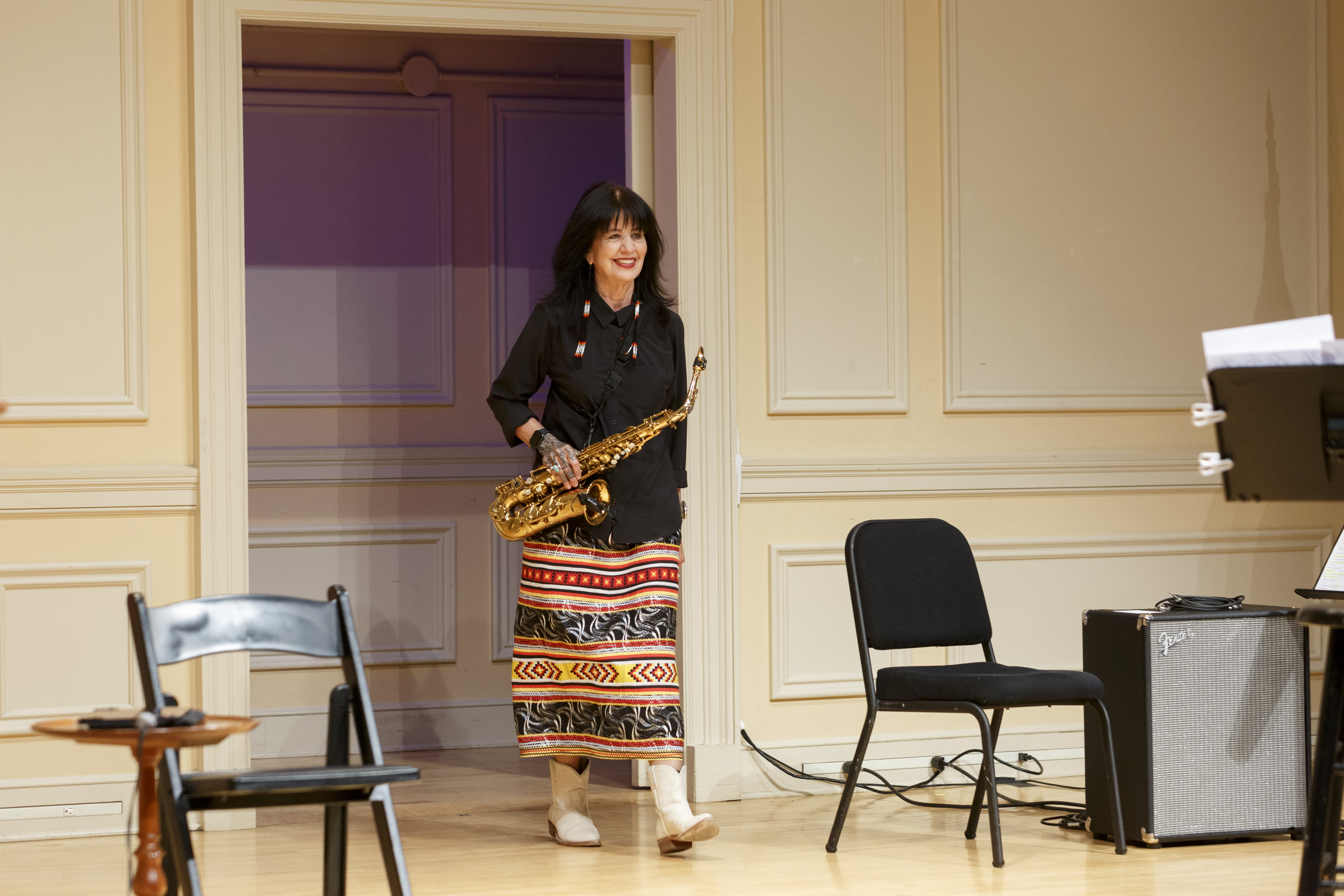
Harjo plays the saxophone at the Library of Congress in 2019

As a musician, Harjo has released seven CDs. These feature both her original music and that of other Native American artists.

Since her first album, the spoken word Letter From the End of the Twentieth Century (2003), and her 1998 solo album Native Joy for Real, Harjo has received numerous awards and honors for her music, including a Native American Music Award (NAMMY) for Best Female Artist of the year for her 2008 album, Winding Through the Milky Way. I Pray for My Enemies is Joy Harjo's seventh album, released in 2021.

She began to play the saxophone at the age of 40. Harjo performs with her saxophone and flutes, both solo and with musicians she calls the Arrow Dynamics Band. She has performed in Europe, South America, India, and Africa, as well as for a range of North American stages, including the Vancouver Folk Music Festival, the Cultural Olympiad at the 1996 Summer Olympics in Atlanta, the 2010 Winter Olympics in Vancouver, Def Poetry Jam, and the Library of Congress.

=== Activism ===
In addition to her creative writing, Harjo has written and spoken about US political and Native American affairs. She is also an active member of the Muscogee Nation and writes poetry as "a voice of the Indigenous people".

Harjo's poetry explores imperialism and colonization, and their effects on violence against women. Scholar Mishuana Goeman writes: "The rich intertextuality of Harjo's poems and her intense connections with other and awareness of Native issues—such as sovereignty, racial formation, and social conditions—provide the foundation for unpacking and linking the function of settler colonial structures within newly arranged global spaces."

In her poems, Harjo often explores her Muscogee background and spirituality in opposition to popular mainstream culture. In a thesis at Iowa University, Eloisa Valenzuela-Mendoza writes: "Native American continuation in the face of colonization is the undercurrent of Harjo's poetics through poetry, music, and performance." Harjo's work touches upon Indigenous land rights and the gravity of the disappearance of her people, while rejecting former narratives that erased Native American histories.

Much of Harjo's work reflects Muscogee values, myths, and beliefs. Her activism for Native American rights and feminism stem from her belief in unity and the lack of separation among human, animal, plant, sky, and earth. She believes that colonialism led to Native American women being oppressed within their own communities, and she works to encourage more political equality between the sexes.

== Awards and recognition ==
In 1995, Harjo received a Lifetime Achievement Award from the Native Writers Circle of The Americas. She is the recipient of the Mountains and Plains Booksellers Award. In 2012, she was inducted into the Mvskoke Creek Nation Hall of Fame.

In 2013, Harjo received the American Book Award from the Before Columbus Foundation for Crazy Brave. Crazy Brave also won the PEN USA Literary Award in Creative Nonfiction that same year.

In 2014, she won the Black Earth Institute Award. Harjo was the recipient of a John Simon Guggenheim Memorial Foundation Fellowship in 2014.

She won the Wallace Stevens Award in Poetry by the Academy of American Poets Board of Chancellors in 2015 and Conflict Resolution for Holy Beings was shortlisted for the 2016 Griffin Poetry Prize.

Harjo won the 2017 Ruth Lilly Poetry Prize and the 2019 Jackson Prize, Poets & Writers.

She won the Association of Tribal Archives, Libraries, and Museums Literary Award in 2019 and was named the United States Poet Laureate that same year.

Harjo won the Oklahoma Book Award for An American Sunrise in 2020. She was awarded the PEN Oakland 2021 Josephine Miles Award for When the Light of the World WasSubdued Our Songs Came Through. Harjo received the 31st Annual Reading the West Book Award for Poetry for When the Light of the World Was Subdued Our Songs Came Through in 2021.

She was an inductee into the National Women's Hall of Fame in 2021 and an inductee into the Native American Hall of Fame that same year.

In 2021, Harjo was designed as the 14th Oklahoma Cultural Treasure at the 44th Oklahoma Governor's Arts Awards.

Harjo's poetry is included on plaque of LUCY, a NASA spacecraft launched in Fall 2021 and the first reconnaissance of the Jupiter Trojans.

She received the Ivan Sandrof Lifetime Achievement Award in 2023. In 2024, Harjo was given the Lumine Lifetime Achievement Award by the Gaylord College of Journalism and Mass Communication at the University of Oklahoma

She received an honorary Doctor of Letters (DLitt) from the University of St Andrews in 2024. Harju was named the Hemingway Distinguished Lecturer at The Community Library in 2024. She received a Kettering Foundation Ruth Yellowhawk Fellowship in 2025.

Harju is an elected member of the American Academy of Arts and Letters, Department of Literature; the American Philosophical Society; the American Academy of Art and Sciences; and the Academy of American Poets.

On November 15, 2025, Harjo was honored with the National Portrait Gallery's Portrait of a Nation Award. The Award recognizes the honoree "for their transformative contributions to American history and culture" and was presented to her by Sandra Cisneros. Harjo's portrait was created by artist Joel Daniel Phillips.

== Personal life ==
In 1967 at the Institute of American Indian Arts, Harjo met fellow student Phil Wilmon, with whom she had a son. Their relationship ended by 1971. In 1972, she met poet Simon Ortiz of the Acoma Pueblo tribe, with whom she had a daughter. She raised both her children as a single mother.

Harjo is married to Owen Chopoksa Sapulpa, and is stepmother to his children.

== Works ==
=== Bibliography ===
==== Poetic works ====
- The Last Song, Puerto Del Sol, 1975.
- What Moon Drove Me to This?, I. Reed Books, 1979, ISBN 978-0-918408-16-7.
- Remember, Strawberry Press, 1981.
- She Had Some Horses, Thunder's Mouth Press, 1983, ISBN 978-1-56025-119-4; W. W. Norton & Company, 2008, ISBN 978-0-393-33421-0.
- Secrets from the Center of the World, University of Arizona Press, 1989, ISBN 978-0-8165-1113-6.
- In Mad Love and War, Wesleyan University Press, 1990, ISBN 978-0-8195-1182-9.
- Fishing, Ox Head Press, 1992.
- The Woman Who Fell From the Sky, W. W. Norton & Company, 1994, ISBN 978-0-393-03715-9.
- A Map to the Next World, W. W. Norton & Company, 2000, ISBN 978-0-393-04790-5.
- How We Became Human New and Selected Poems: 1975–2001, W. W. Norton & Company, 2004, ISBN 978-0-393-32534-8.
- Conflict Resolution for Holy Beings: Poems, W. W. Norton & Company, 2015, ISBN 978-0-393-24850-0. (shortlisted for the 2016 Griffin Poetry Prize)
- An American Sunrise: Poems, W. W. Norton & Company, 2019, ISBN 978-1-324-00386-1
- Weaving sundown in a scarlet light : fifty poems for fifty years. New York, New York: W. W. Norton & Company. 2023. ISBN 978-1-324-03648-7. OCLC 1294289380.
- Cloud Runner: Poems, W.W. Norton & Company, 2026, ISBN 978-1-324-12365-1.

==== As editor ====
- Reinventing the Enemy's Language: Contemporary Native Women's Writings of North America, W.W. Norton & Company, 1998, ISBN 978-0-393-31828-9.
- When the Light of the World Was Subdued Our Songs Came Through: A Norton Anthology of Native Nations Poetry, W.W. Norton, 2020, ISBN 978-0393356809
- Living Nations, Living Words: An Anthology of First Peoples Poetry, W.W. Norton, 2021, ISBN 978-0393867916

Plays

- Wings of Night Sky, Wings of Morning Light: A Play by Joy Harjo and a Circle of Responses, Wesleyan University Press, January 25, 2019, ISBN 978-0819578655

==== Non-fiction ====
- The Spiral of Memory: Interviews. Poets on Poetry. University of Michigan Press. 1995. ISBN 978-0472065813.
- Soul Talk, Song Language: Conversations with Joy Harjo. Wesleyan University Press. 2011. ISBN 978-0-8195-7151-9..
- Crazy Brave: A Memoir. W. W. Norton & Company. 2012. ISBN 978-0-393-07346-1..
- Poet Warrior. W.W. Norton. 2021. ISBN 978-0393248524..
- Catching the light. New Haven: Yale University Press. 2022. ISBN 978-0-300-25703-8. OCLC 1310155936.
- Girl Warrior: On Coming of Age, W.W. Norton, 2025, ISBN 978-1-324-09417-3

==== Children's literature and Illustrated Books ====
- The Good Luck Cat, Houghton Mifflin Harcourt, 2000, ISBN 978-0-15-232197-0
- For a Girl Becoming, University of Arizona Press, 2009, ISBN 978-0-8165-2797-7
- Remember, Random House Studio, 2023, ISBN 978-0-593-48484-5
- Washing My Mother's Body: A Ceremony for Grief, Ten Speed Press, 2025, ISBN 978-1-9848-6136-8
- Gathering the Light, Random House Studio, 2026, ISBN 978-0-593-90155-7

=== Discography ===
==== Solo albums ====
- Letter from the End of the Twentieth Century (2003)
- Native Joy for Real (2004)
- She Had Some Horses (2006)
- Winding Through the Milky Way (2008)
- Red Dreams, A Trail Beyond Tears (2010)
- I Pray For My Enemies (2021)
- Insomnia and Seven Steps to Grace (2026)

==== Singles ====
- This America (2011)

==== Joy Harjo and Poetic Justice ====
- Letter from the End of the Twentieth Century (1997)

== See also ==
- List of writers from peoples indigenous to the Americas
- Native American Studies
