= Frances Butler =

American artist (1940–2024)

Frances Marie Clark Butler
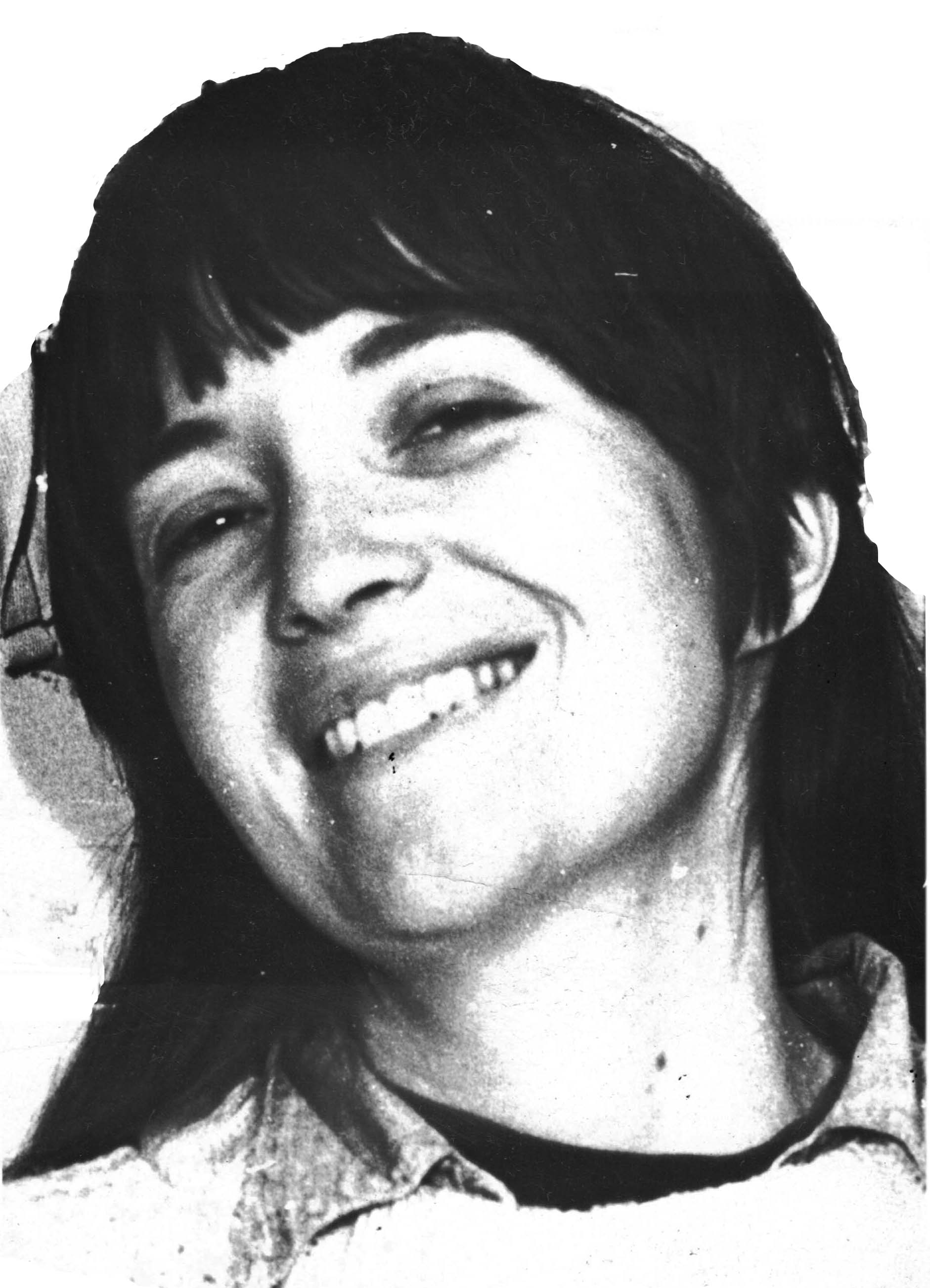
- Born: November 28, 1940; Webster Groves, Missouri
- Died: September 23, 2024 (aged 83)
- Occupations: faculty member in the Design Department at the University of California, Berkeley and Davis
- Known for: textile artist, a clothing, book, and garden designer, and co-founder of Goodstuffs, a textile-printing company

Frances Marie Clark Butler (28 November 1940 – 23 September 2024) was a faculty member in the (now-defunct) Design Department at the University of California, Berkeley, and later at the University of California, Davis; she was also a textile artist, a clothing, book, and garden designer, and co-founder of Goodstuffs, a textile-printing company.

== Early life and education ==
Butler was born in Webster Groves, Missouri. She claimed (in jest) descent from a treasurer of the Confederacy. Her father, Robert Denholme Clark, was a petrochemist, who relocated to Berkeley, California, where Frances attended Willard Junior High. The family lived in a ranch-style house in the forested hills above the Claremont Hotel.

When her parents later relocated to Tehran, Frances and her younger brother, William, attended the American School in Beirut while their parents were in Iran.

Back in Berkeley, she finished high school, and received an honors degree in History from University of California, Berkeley in 1961. Frances then attended Stanford University, where she earned her masters in History as a Woodrow Wilson fellow (summa cum laude). She would ride a Vespa across the San Francisco Bay Bridge to get there. The old western span of the bridge had expansion breaks every 50 feet, through which a strong gust of wind blew.

== Marriage and career ==
She married Jonathan Butler, a Romance philologist and polymath, and with a travel grant they lived in Sardinia for a year, where he wrote a dictionary of Sardinian. Escaping cold weather, they made trips to London, Heidelberg, and Florence.

After receiving an M.A. in Design in 1965, Frances began teaching in the Design Department at Berkeley. She influenced David Lance Goines, loaning him the book on Weimar-era posters on which he based his style. The Design Department was the center for the anti-Vietnam War protest movement, and many protest posters and banners were created in the college. It was eventually closed, popularly thought to be at the orders of Governor Reagan, but insiders say it was the college administrators who did not care for design. During this time, in the late sixties, Frances created posters and graphic design on commission and sewed a series of two dozen or more dresses and coats.

After the closure of the Department of Design, she took a teaching position at University of California, Davis, where her husband taught Italian, but they bought a house and lived in Berkeley. They started a textile printing company, Goodstuffs, in Emeryville in 1969 to manufacture screen-printed running yardage after her designs, which sold well, with her husband as manager.

The great tragedy of her life was a car accident on New Year's Day 1974, when a drunk ran into their Volkswagen Beetle: Jonathan was killed and Frances was in a coma for a month. Then she was in rehabilitation learning to walk again.

A year later, in April 1975, Berkeley Library School professor Roger Levenson suggested she take over teaching his class at The Bancroft Library, "Printing on the Handpress." She went to Arif Press in Berkeley, where she met Alastair Johnston who helped her with typesetting and printing. She invited him to be her teaching assistant, and this led to the founding of Poltroon Press.

She wrote a doctoral thesis on American designer Will Bradley, which she submitted to the Library School at Berkeley, but she was told by the dean, Robert Harlan, she couldn't be a Berkeley student at the same time as she was a professor at another campus. She then started over and wrote a new dissertation on the cosmology of Portuguese immigrant gardens in California (this was inspired by her friendship with architectural historian John Beach), which she submitted to the College of Environmental Design at Berkeley. During this time, the mid-1980s, she gave a course of guest lectures at Berkeley which were well-attended. Her lectures covered everything from Persian textiles, to cosmologies in garden design, to her passion for primitive and folk art. When she was defending her thesis, one committee member said, "We should be getting a degree from you!"

She wrote for many journals, including Fine Print and Visible Language. The publisher of Design Book Review, John Parman wrote, "Frances was an early and wonderful contributor to Design Book Review, the author of a number of memorable essay-reviews that set the tone for much that followed. It was remarkably generous and of course I learned a huge amount about the history of design."

A former student, Betty Ho, who studied graphic design at UC Davis wrote, "She was one of the more interesting and vibrant professors at Davis. I took an intro to design class with her my freshman year and dropped my last quarter of chemistry to major in environmental design. She took us on field trips to Mark Bullwinkle's yard sculptures, her shadow garden and to some printing presses. I took a typography class from her and I remember her slideshow of masculine ads (sans serif type) and feminine ads (cursive type). She was super knowledgeable and I learned a lot from her."

Around 1990 Butler was offered early retirement from UC Davis where she was chair of the Design Program in the Department of Applied Behavioral Sciences in the College of Agricultural and Environmental Sciences. She decided to look for property in the country and found a farm in the Capay Valley, in California, but groundwater tests showed high levels of DDT. She then turned her attention to France and toured the south but found it over-priced and over-populated. On her return north she visited a friend in the Dordogne who knew of a farm for sale that suited her well. She spent over 30 years there, with cats, dogs, and two donkeys, as well as becoming quite a local legend, first for her American ways (accidentally serving horse meat at a barbecue picnic), then as she decorated her buildings with colored plaster and mosaics, telling the story of Orpheus and Eurydice, and curious neighbors became admirers.

== Textile art ==
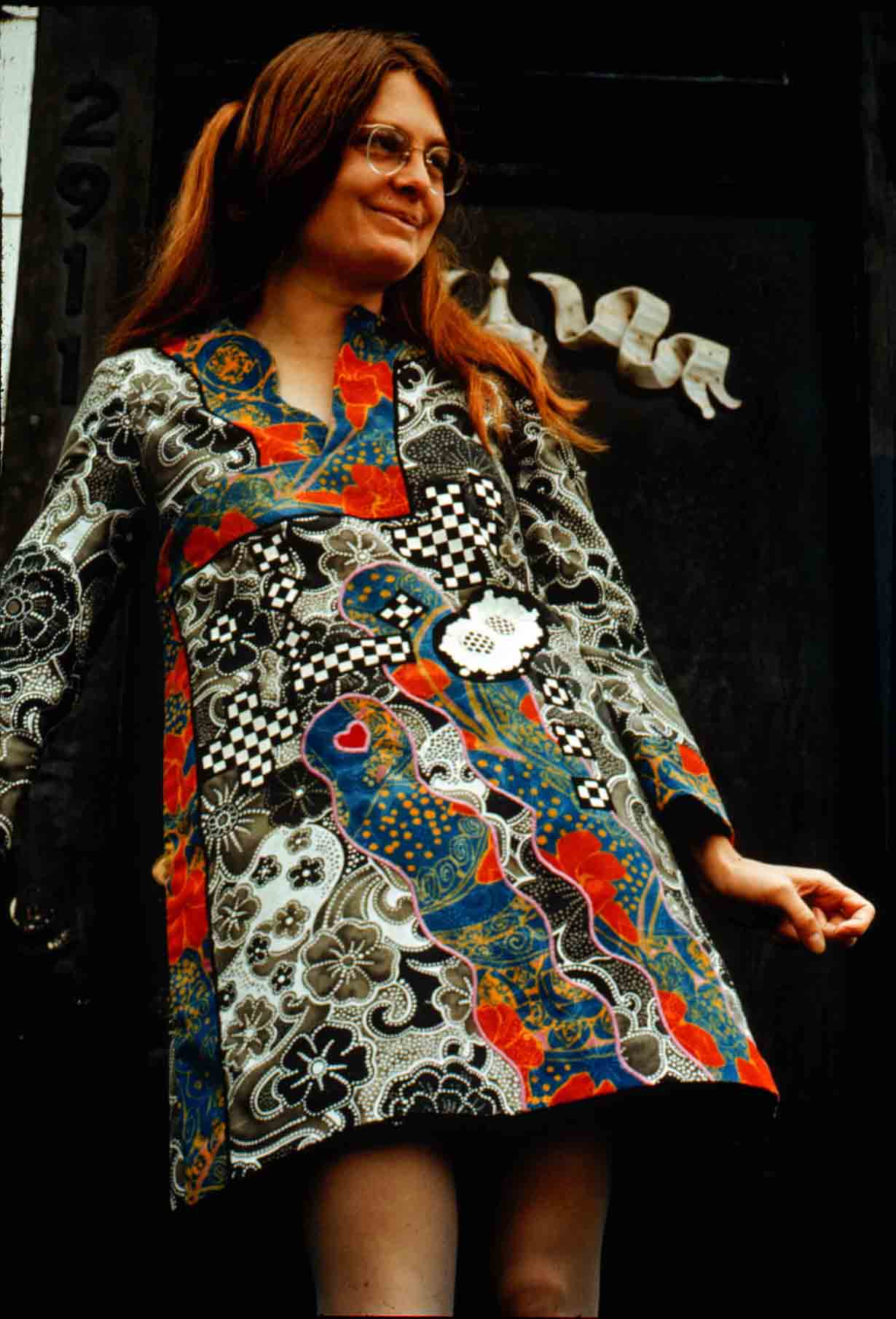
Dress made from collaged fabric, late 1960s

Frances Butler began making clothes in the 1960s. She made several dozen unique dresses in a collage technique with pieces of fabric from a large collection, both purchased and inherited from her mother who had made clothes for her as a child. http://www.poltroonpress.com/engineered-dresses-by-frances-c-butler/

She designed & printed posters for a film society in Berkeley, and worked on other design commissions.

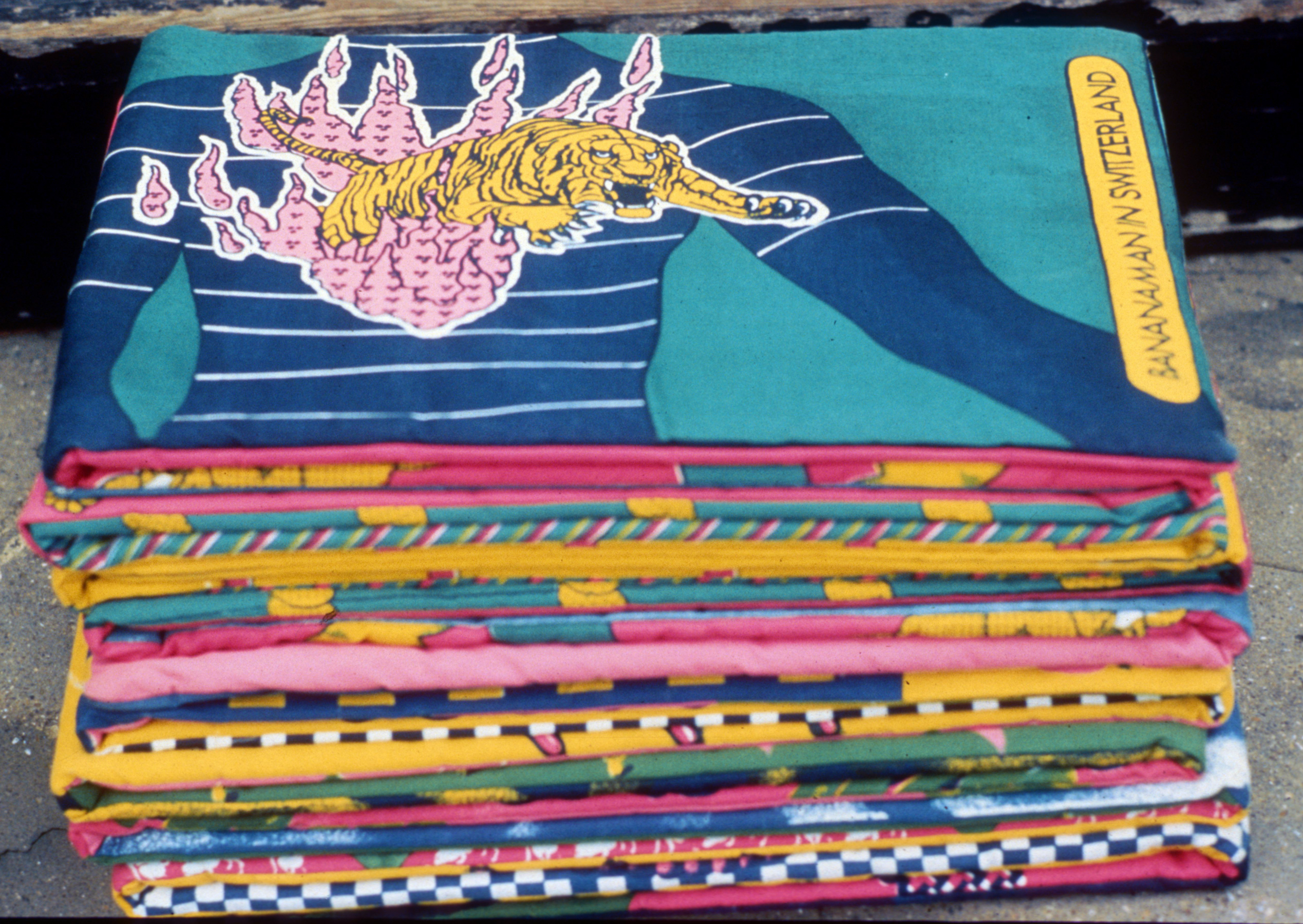
two pillowbooks, stuffed screenprinted fabric

She created two "Pillow books" in silkscreen. The first "Peach Skin Preface" (1970), is a story of the birth of twins as a parody of Sei Shonagon's Pillow Book, the second "as a companion to fluff-up the pillow, was called 'BananaMan in Switzerland' and was, of all things, a critique of the then dominant style of grid-system Helvetica-based Swiss graphic design. I mocked this style with a dog shaped biscuit eating a bowl-full of Swiss-style Swiss cheese."

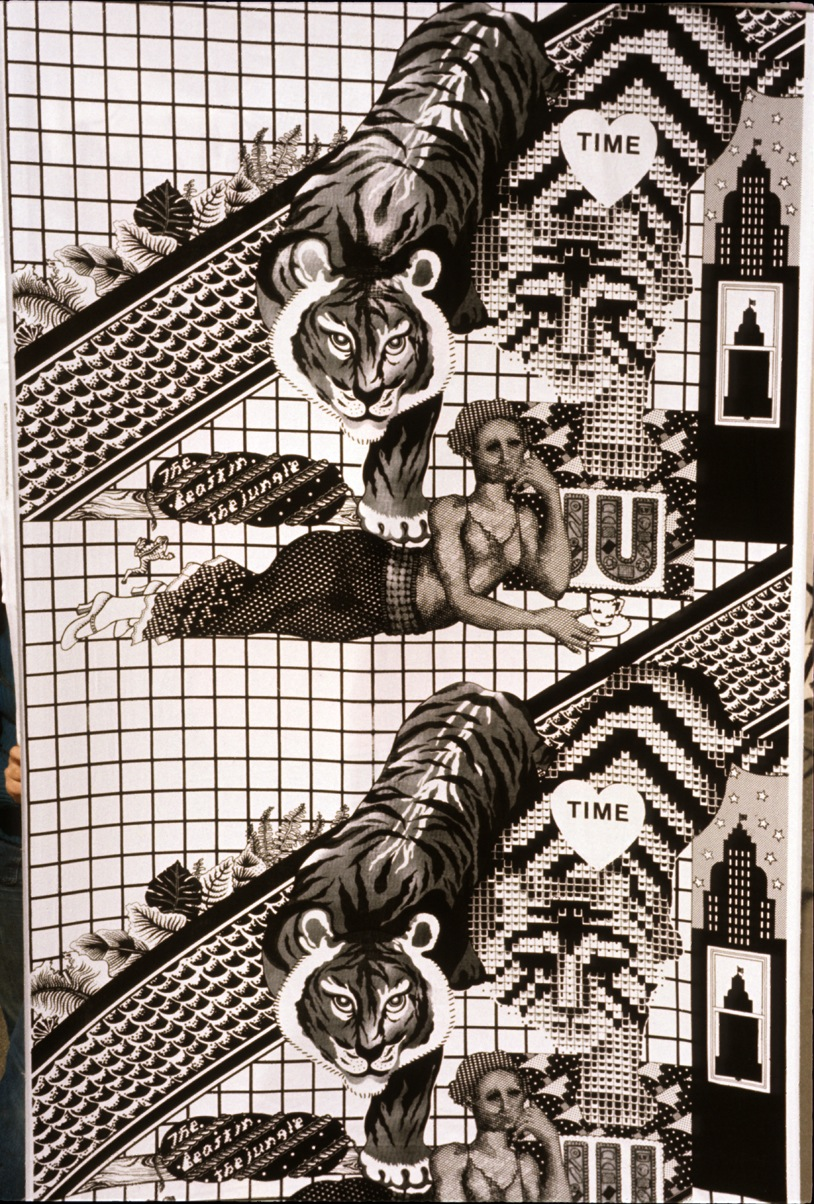
Running yardage, 48 inches wide, The Beast in the Jungle

In 1971 Butler had the idea of designing running yardage to replicate some of her visual ideas so the garments wouldn't have to be pieced together, but could be made from fabric of her own design. With her husband, she established Goodstuffs Handprinted Fabrics in Emeryville, California.

Goodstuffs was set up in a block-long loft that had three long screen-printing tables, 5 feet wide and about 200 feet long, that were covered in waxed canvas. At one end was attached a bolt of heavy-duty white cotton which could be unrolled and stretched the entire length of the table and held down by the wax. A metal rail along one side had adjustable stops attached to it that would serve as guides for registering multiple silkscreens. These screens were on varnished waterproof wooden stretchers that were 6 to 8 feet long and four feet wide. Based on designs cut in rubylith film by Butler, and then exposed with a carbon-arc lamp and washed out in a walk-in shower, the screens were complex and could be registered very closely, allowing for far more detail than seen in contemporary fabric art such as Marimekko of Finland, which tended to have simple non-overlapping shapes.

In the book 5000 Years of Textiles, edited by Jennifer Harris (British Museum Press & the Victoria & Albert Museum, 1993), Chapter 9 focuses on Colonial North America. This brief overview reports (p. 262), "By the mid-1930s California's distinct style had aroused national interest, and its burgeoning clothing industry, soon to be second only to New York’s, helped to support small enterprises such as California Handprints … and in the 1960s and 70s Frances Butler’s Goodstuffs, as well as larger firms."

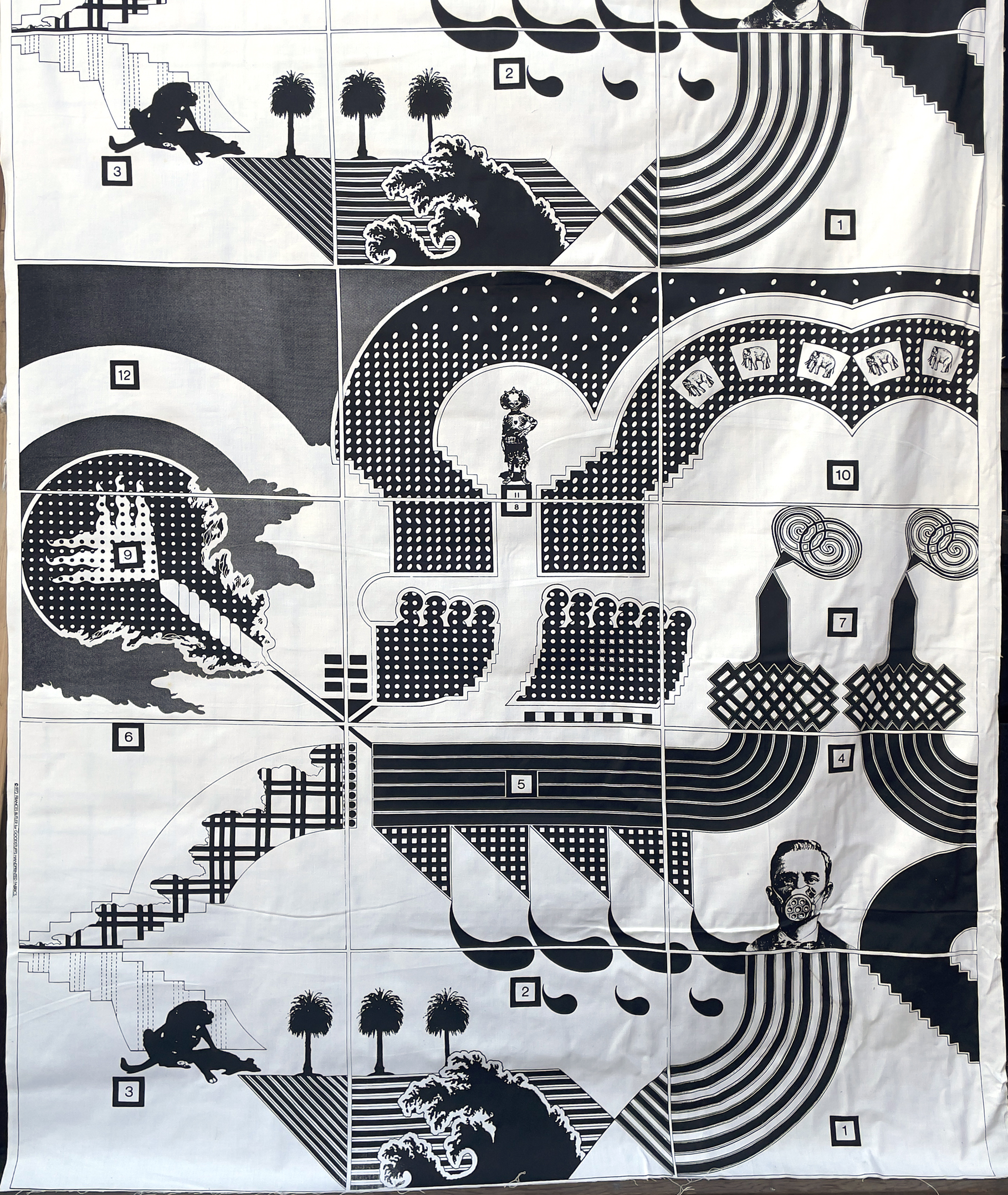
screenprint on fabric, 48 inches wide

The caption to Butler’s "Worried Man" reads, "The vitality of post-World War II American art has also contributed to a unique style, 'Worried Man,' (1974) was designed by Frances Butler as a two-layered calendar and printed on cotton by Goodstuffs Handprinted Fabrics, her screen-printing firm, which operated in Emeryville, California between 1972 and 1979. A graphic artist, Butler began printing on cloth in the late 1960s, and was influential in creating the taste for more sophisticated visual imagery which superseded fabric designs in the pop art idiom."

Butler made her own inks with procion dye and also sold ink in bulk through Dharma Trading Company in Berkeley. The ink was forced through the screen with squeegees, operated by two people on opposite sides who then moved the screen to the next stop on the table. The work was done quickly to ensure close registration before the drying ink caused the fabric to pull and shrink.

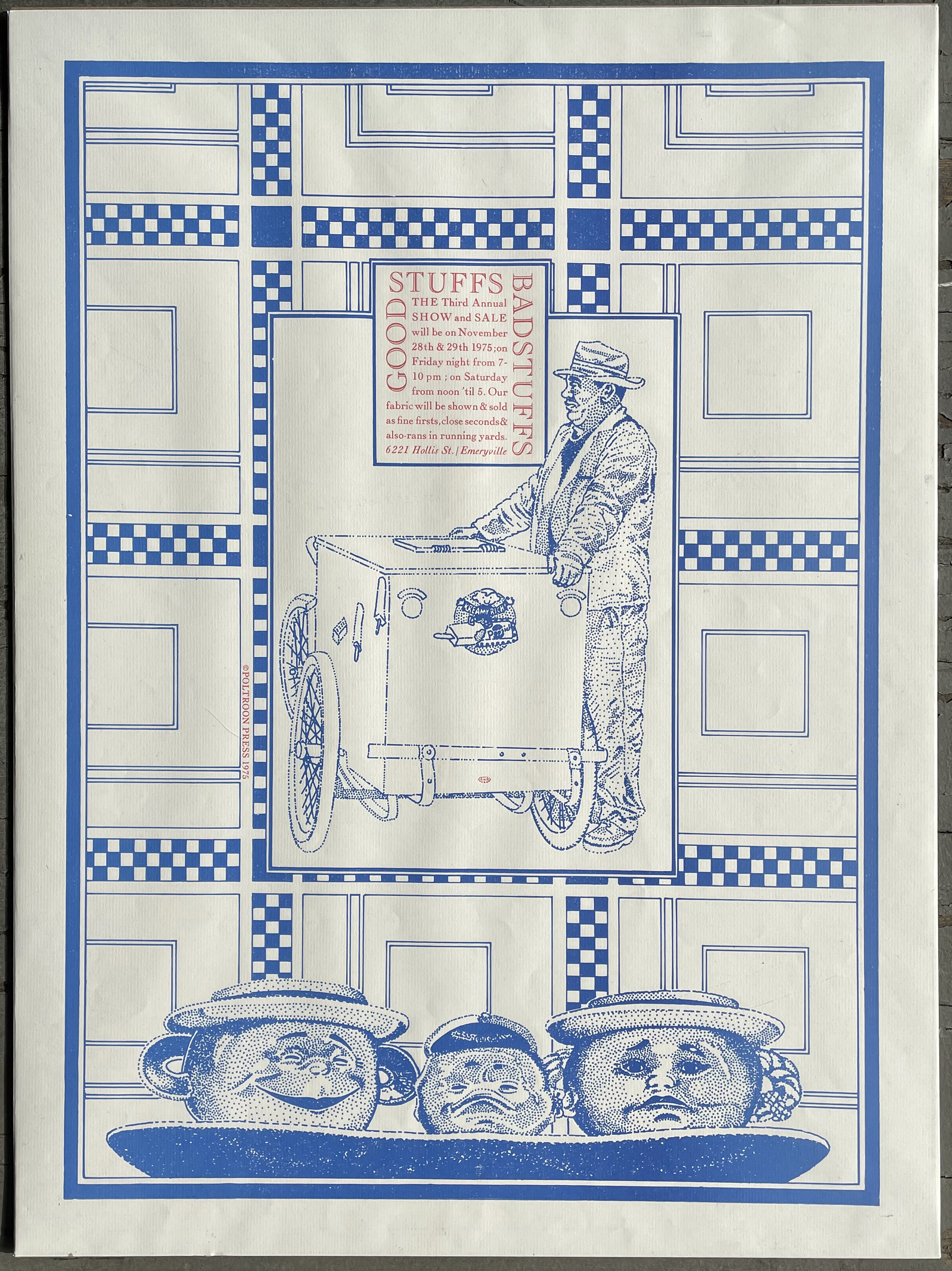

After printing, the screens, which were large and ungainly, were washed out and stored, while the fabric was allowed to set for an hour, then pulled off the table and "flown" on rods suspended from wires to dry overnight. Several hundred yards were produced daily, but there was a lot of spoilage (especially in yardage with four or more screens, or large solid areas of color), some of which was sold in an annual "Goodstuffs badstuffs" sale on the premises.

Butler taught Graphic Design at U.C. Davis in the Department of Environmental Design but her colleagues included a number of major textile artists, Katherine Westphal (a quilter, 1919–2018), Jo Ann Stabb (textile scholar, 1942-2022), Barbara Shawcross (famed as a non-loom textile artist, 1930-2021), and Gyöngy Laky (b. 1944, a sculptor, who ran Fiberworks, Center for the Textile Arts, in Berkeley). Frances Butler made a number of soft sculptures which were exhibited in traditional art venues.

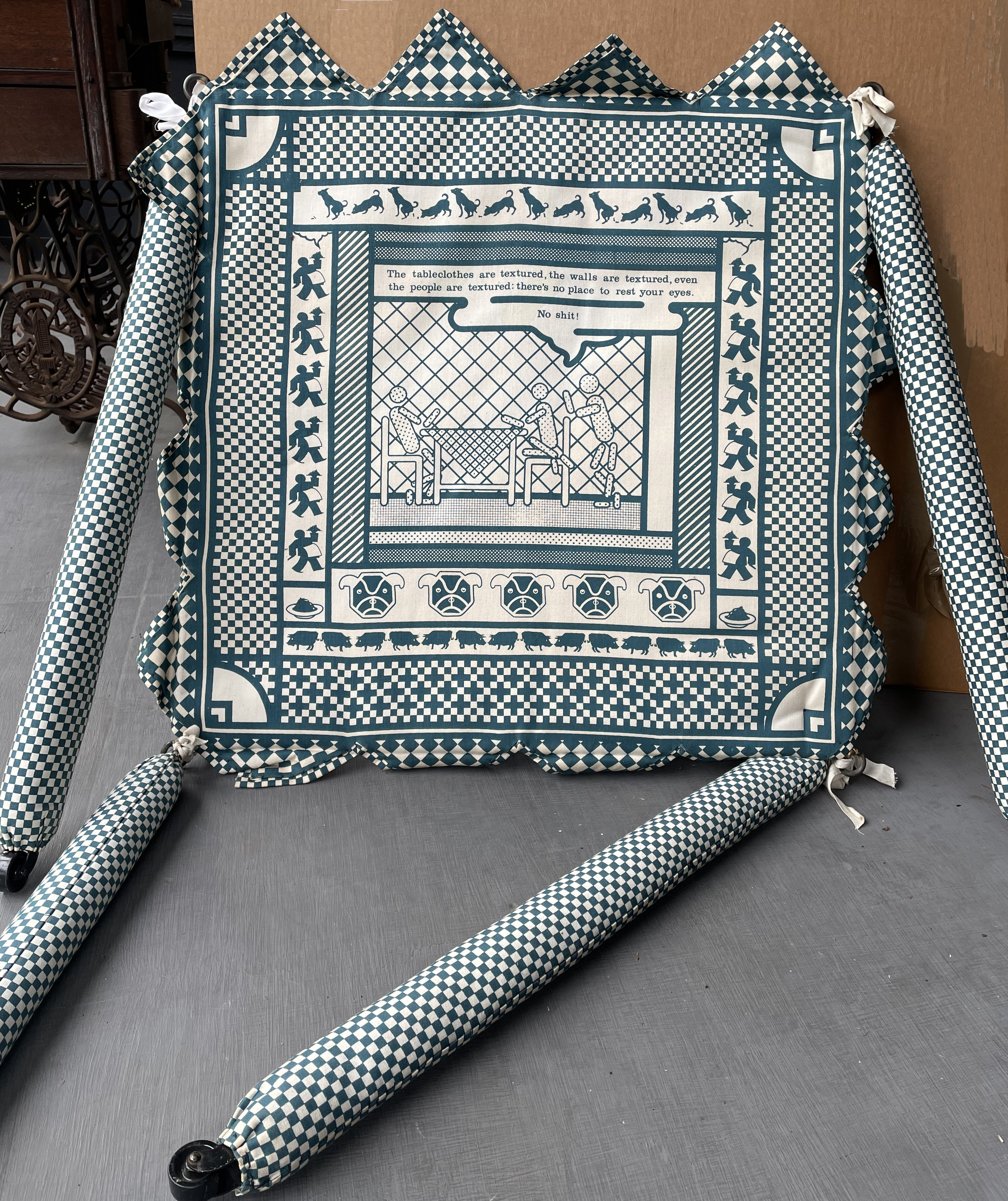

These included (among others) a series of table-cloths, ranging from "Excess," a 30-foot square tablecloth for a 4 foot table, or a "Knotted Table Cloth"; table shaped stuffed pieces, each 8 feet long, knotted and stacked on a wheeled support board, with a variant, "Stuffed Shirts", which were printed and stacked shirt images on a rolling board, and "Collapsed Tea Tables": one with the design of a water-filled grid running down and off the tablecloth, another with a caption taken from a commentator on her work "The tablecloths are textured, the walls are textured, even the people are textured: there's no place to rest your eyes. No shit!"

Colleagues from the textile world remembered her in an online video, posted by Julie Anixter of Fiberworks/ https://www.youtube.com/watch?v=msdw1A9Mzfw

By the mid-1970s she had a line of wall hangings and aprons that were sold in craft fairs as well as by salesmen (the latter were popular in stores like Gene Opton's The Kitchen in Berkeley). She explained in a letter to a museum curator: "The twenty or more 'wall hangings' I designed and printed, were sold to be stretched onto frames and used as interior decoration. I devised this scheme to keep my five employees hired, and sold stretched sets to hotels and banks etc. and the fabric to a few local stores (San Francisco Bay Area), and a New York store which then sold the designs world wide."

Early commissions included wall hangings for the interiors of the offices of the Bank of America Headquarters in San Francisco and a hotel in Taiwan.

Her other early artwork, in calligraphy, poster design and woodcut, also merged nicely into her textile designs. She took an image of a Balinese dancer on a turtle (which was originally a poster designed and silkscreened on paper in 1970) and converted it into a fabric print in 1971. As she wrote to a Denver museum curator: "Some of my designs were much larger. The design of a Japanese warrior battling a dragon, from 1970-71, measured about 4 feet by 6 feet and was based on a Japanese tattoo (interest in tattoos was just beginning at that time and I had bought a few books in Japan on the subject).

"I also designed and printed a quilt-comforter with series of roads and landscapes, buildings and wandering elephants, complete with toy animals, carts and cars in 4 corner pockets, to provide a 'Land of Counterpane' bed comforter for children. This was called 'Elephant Crossing' (1973), and would have been appropriate to children in Alaska, but was too heavy, and hot, for any other environment. The cotton that I used was a thick twill, quite costly, and really unnecessary for wall hangings, but I had designed all my fabrics for it.

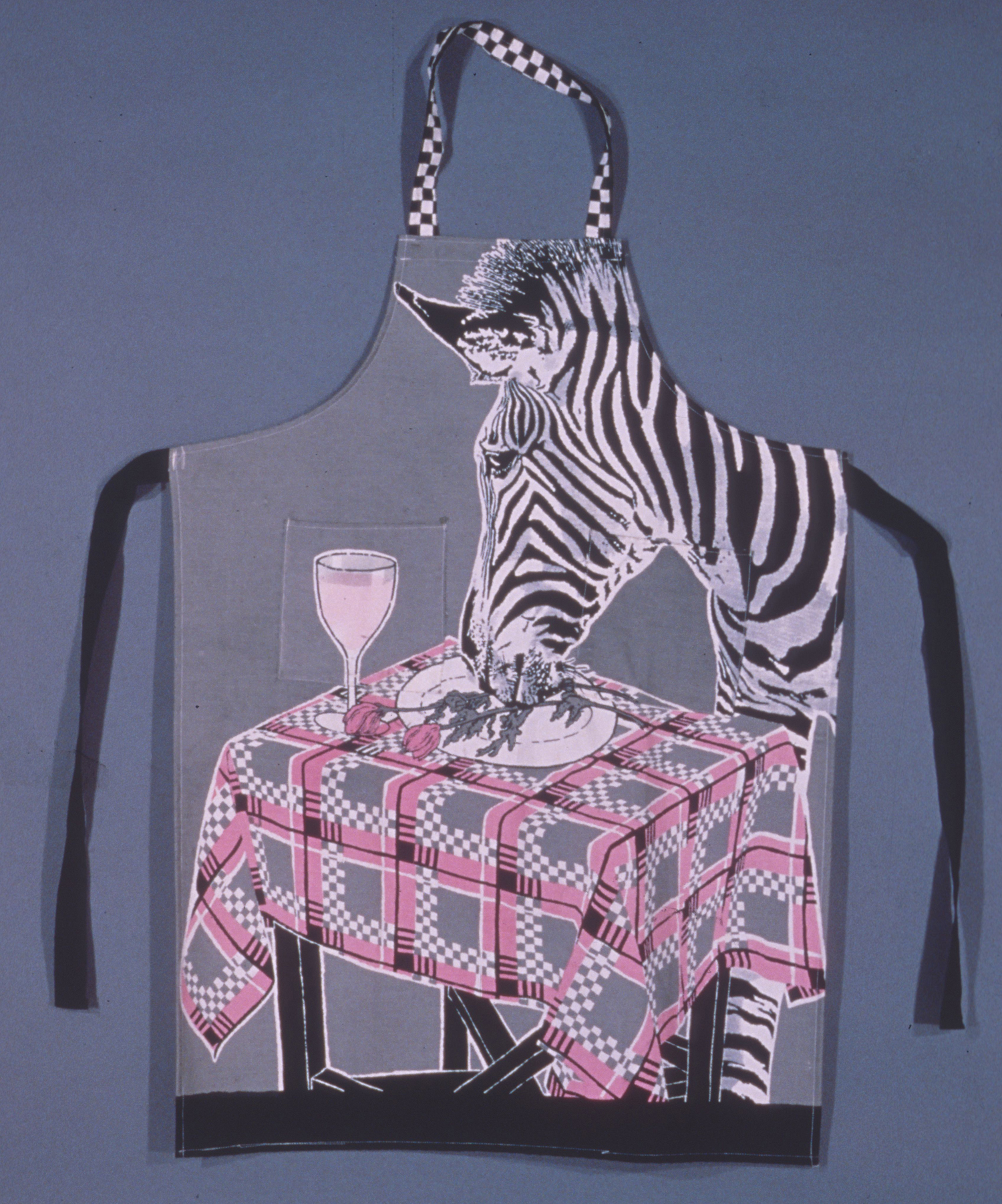

"In my efforts to keep my employees hired (I earned my living as a Prof. of Design teaching at first U.C. Berkeley and after that Department was closed down, U.C. Davis), I tried making and selling some other products. One was a series of five apron designs, from 1975. The woman with the carrots was photographed on a trip to Scandinavia, and I was amused by the distortion of the dots on her t-shirt as the fabric responded to her figure. The zebra, monkeys, geese and bear were all sitting around a little table that I had in my kitchen in Berkeley. I also made and sold pillow covers and pillows. These designs I printed 4-up on the 48 inch wide fabric, and had sewn with zippers."

In the early 70s Butler had visited Japan and met the artist Kiyoshi Awazu, who sent her a design of a samurai and geisha making love in the moonlight to be turned into a large wall-hanging. She was disturbed that the salesmen regularly reported to her that her vibrant color schemes were too much for some customers and she should consider more earth tones, and produce friendlier graphics, so she created a series of black and white animals, a panda and a zebra, etc. Her print "Frog Pond" appears in the 1978 horror film, Invasion of the Body Snatchers, directed by Philip Kaufman. The alien pod person hatches beneath it.

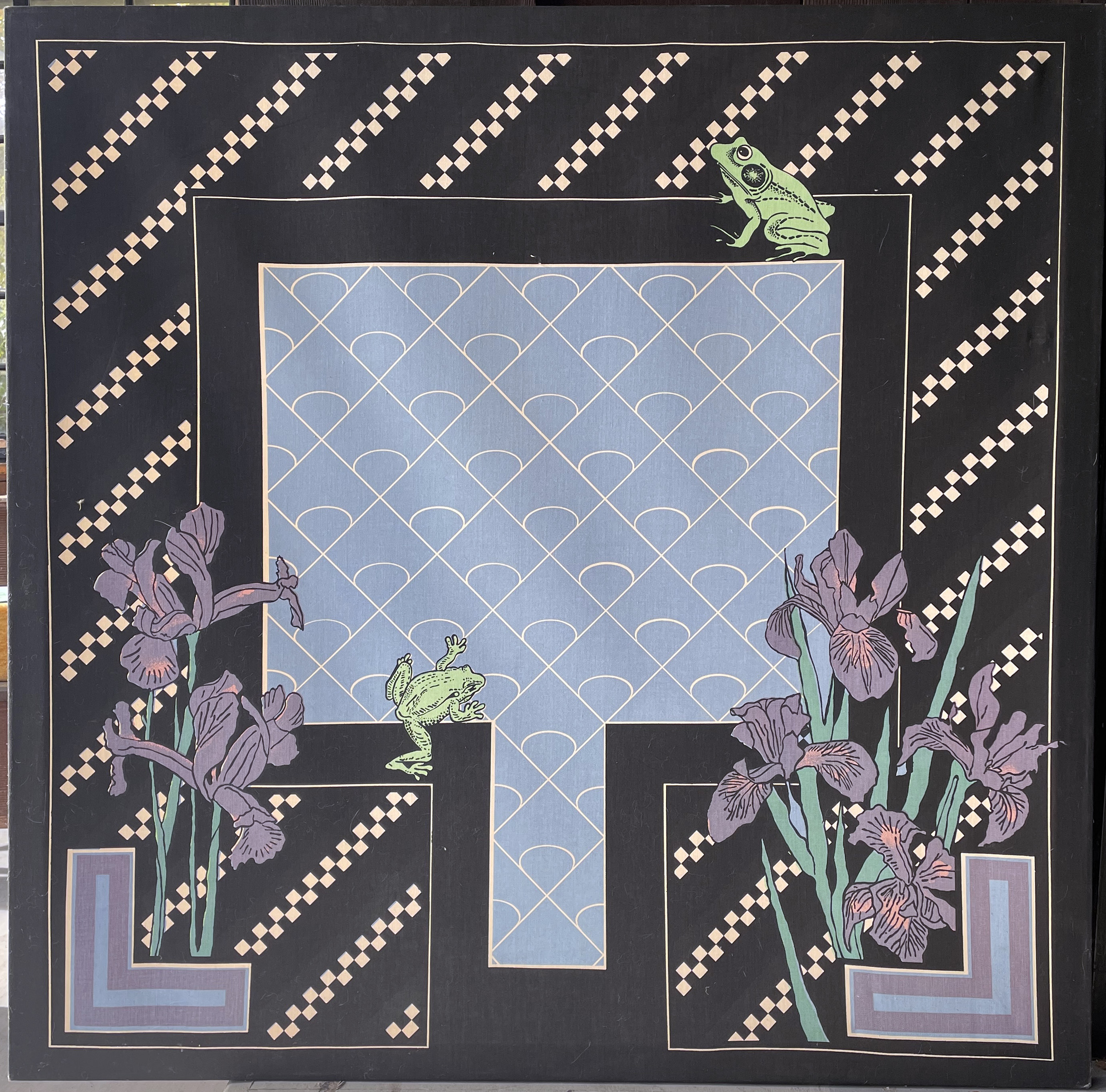
screen print on fabric, 48 inches square

That year, she made a deal with the Grossman company of New York who arranged to have her designs printed by Borås in Sweden, but she found out they were also selling a budget version on cheaper cloth and when they stopped paying her royalties, she closed the business in 1979.

== Garden art ==
Butler remodeled her backyard garden in the 1970s, first with wooden lattices that were made to resemble collapsing trellises she had seen in Portuguese immigrant gardens. These were old vine arbors; she liked the shadows cast by these structures and so installed some nylon screens with cut-out letters to cast moving shadows, the texts were provided by her press partner Alastair Johnston, who came up with "Heliogabalus" for above the rose beds, and "L8R"; she also used a version of Piet Zwart's ad for NKF reading "Hot Spots" with a giant O in the middle, and Tom Raworth's phrase "Light & Heavy Light." When the wood letters also decayed, she replaced some of them with cut-out plastic ones. In order to "dog proof" her flower beds from her Queensland Blue Heelers, she next constructed cinderblock towers for the roses and covered them in mosaics. This occupied her from 1980-89 as she discovered new techniques of colored cast concrete. In turn this led her to make some inlaid mosaic tables and other mosaic works. Ultimately she perfected this technique on the walls of her French farm where she told the story of Orpheus and Eurydice in crépi coloré and mosaic.

There were at least two other major garden projects. One was done with a Seattle artist Peter Requem for a roof terrace at the University Hospital at the University of Washington in Seattle. Another shadow garden as a place of peace for patients, it was dismantled when the hospital expanded. Another was a garden of senses for the blind in Tennessee, featuring aromatic plants. This was commissioned by a country music artist and had Braille texts in large chrome-topped bolts embedded in the cast cement, which was moulded over wire armatures.

== Poltroon Press ==
In 2005, Butler was asked to submit a biography for a show entitled "Women in the Arts"; she wrote:

After a conventional education reading History at the University of California, Berkeley and Stanford University, I switched course, educated myself as a book designer and calligrapher, taking the last letterpress class offered at Oakland’s Laney Trade School and studying with the calligrapher Arne Wolf. I continued to hang around academies, eventually becoming a Professor in the Department of Environmental Design at the University of California, at Berkeley, then at Davis. I won grants from the National Endowment for the Arts, was a visiting artist at various institutions, the Art Institute of Chicago, or the Jan Van Eyck Akademie in Maastricht, and my work was collected by museums. I won commissions for public art projects and I wrote articles for design journals and book arts publications. But my main creative impulse has always been the exploration of the margins of commercial production, outside academic institutions or the art world, leaving a field as it became assimilated. My mother taught me to sew and I began by sewing garments for sale, as an early practitioner of “Art for Wearing.” I opened a fabric printing workshop, Goodstuffs Handprinted Fabrics in 1969 to enhance my fashion production but instead produced running yardage, wall-hangings and then fabric sculpture projects. I set up Poltroon Press in 1975 with Alastair Johnston. At first I combined books and fabric projects, including making a series of garments as “reading environments.” But I closed Goodstuffs in 1979, and concentrated on producing books, posters, and ephemera at Poltroon Press for another decade. While Poltroon Press is still ongoing, I have gone on myself, first working on various public art sculptural projects for hospitals or colleges, and now working on a large mosaic-covered project on my farm in South Western France.

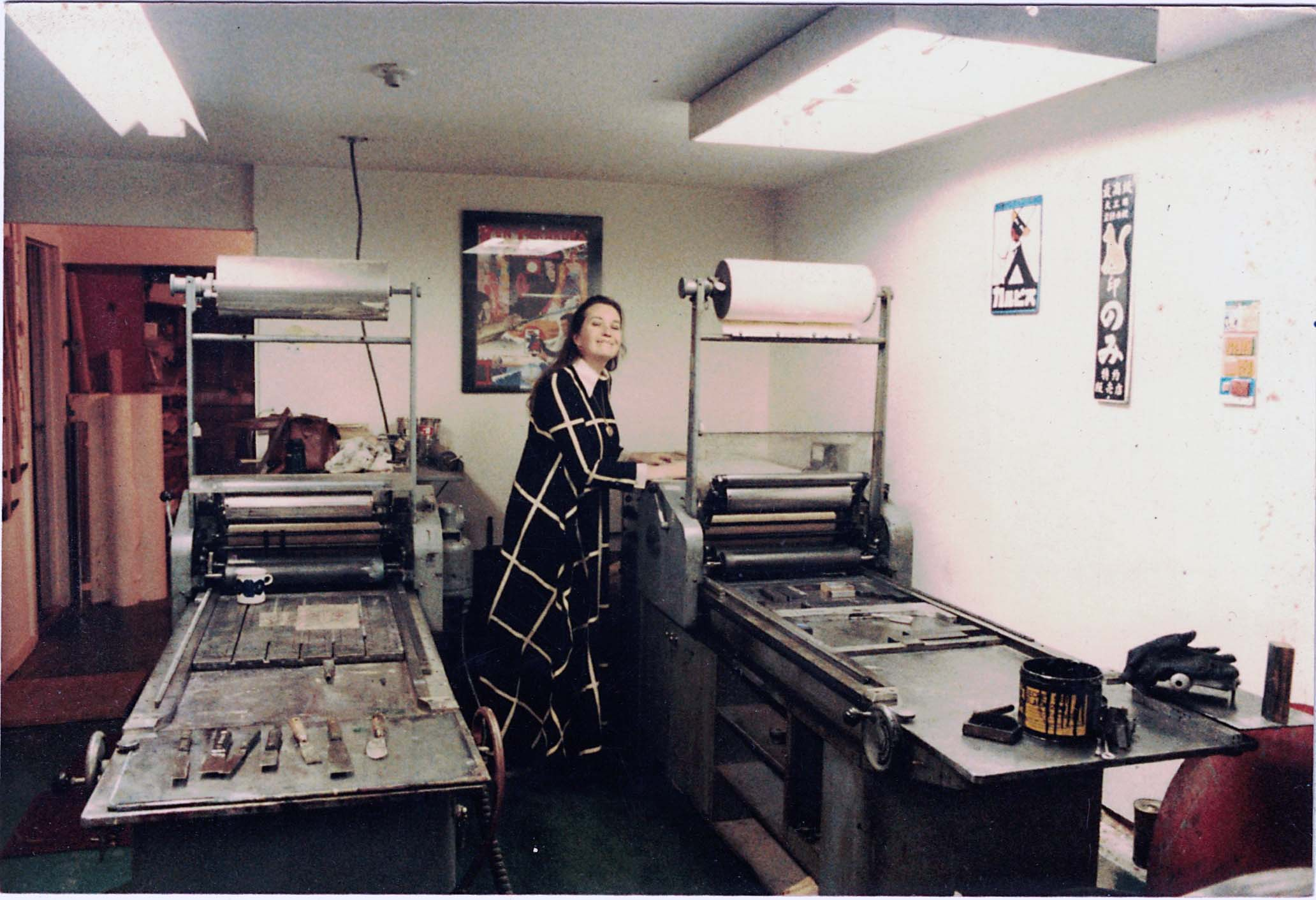

Confracti Mundi Rudera

In the past I struggled to assert the importance of mental image-making as an equal to language in the cognitive process, attacking logocentrism for stunting the brain as thalidomide stunted the bodies of unborn babies. But now, confronted with the Graphic Novel, of say Art Spieglemann or Jimmy Corrigan, I differentiate my own two-streamed approach to combining text and image from this essentially cinematic form, feeling that the excellence of the drawing, and especially of the editing in a Graphic Novel substitutes the artist's world for the visual experiences of the reader and lessens the impact of images inspired by the language used.

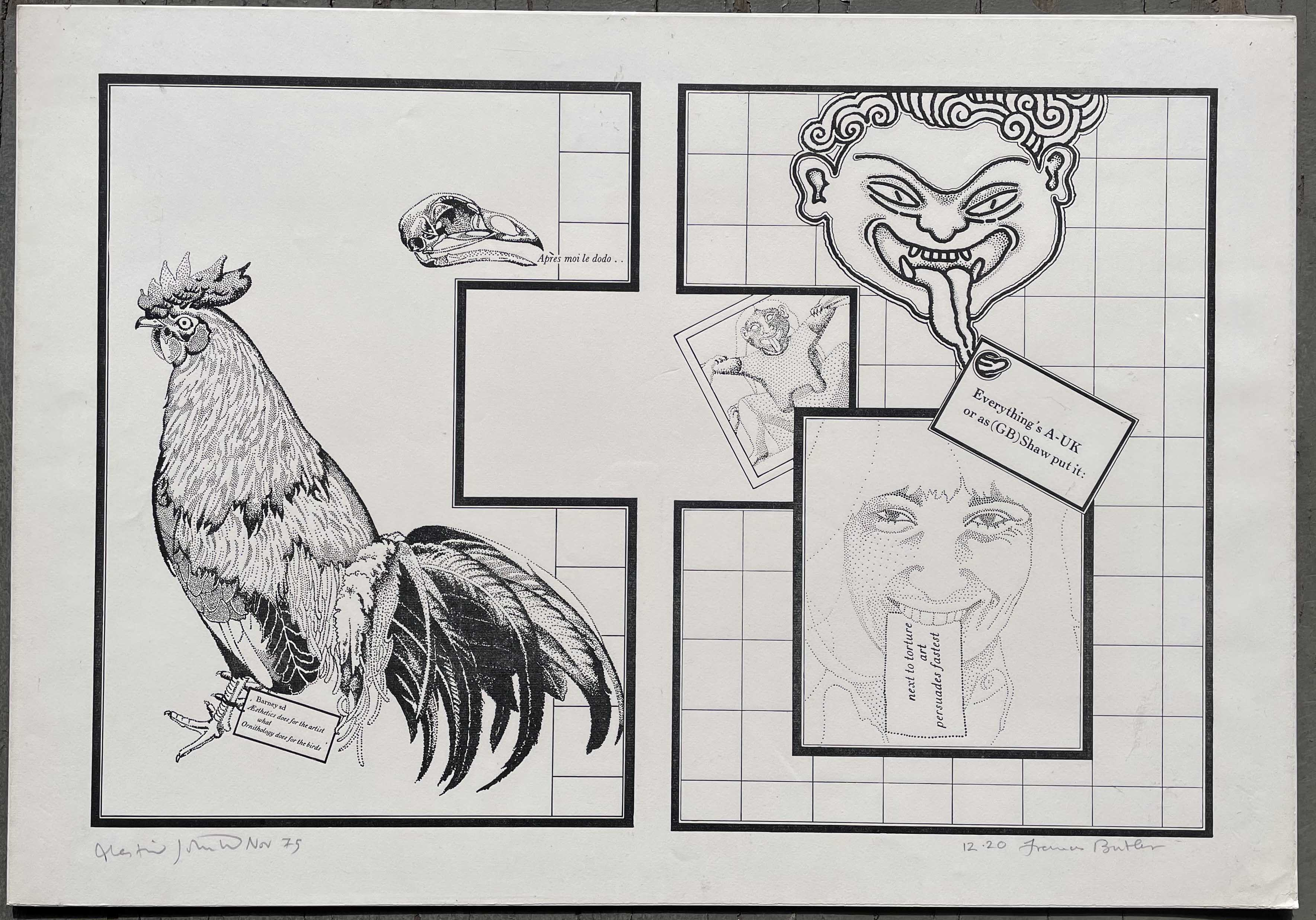

From the first book I produced at Poltroon Press, Confracti Mundi Rudera, I have attempted to formulate a printed book in which the graphic image and the text established different trains of speculation, which would interact with each other, not illustrate each other, two streams of metaphor, counterposed. I chose writings from my press partner Alastair Johnston’s notebooks, and combined them with images that I drew from the thousands of photographs I’d taken of everything from roof guttering to clothing to signs and artifacts in shop windows. An example of this two-stream mixing can be seen in opening sequence of four pages in Confracti Mundi Rudera. I was disconcerted to discover that my authorship of this book based on a two-streamed mix was completely discounted, there not being a category in the card catalog to cover it. I persevered for a while, producing other two-streamed books, including Logbook, a collaboration with Tom Raworth, and New Dryads (are waiting for your call) again with Alastair Johnston, before, as usual, moving on in the 1990s to yet another aspect of visual experimentation, this time tile setting, mosaics and the making of poetry gardens.

== Minnesota Center for Book Arts ==
Butler was the first visiting lecturer at the Minnesota Center for Book Arts and "spoke of book arts in terms of re-defining tradition," challenging the center to adopt a more forward-thinking mission.

== Selected solo and group exhibitions ==
- 1981
  - Diagrams of Natural Energy, Meyer Breier Weiss, San Francisco
  - New Dryads (Are Ready for Your Call), Piater Brattinga Gallery, Amsterdam
  - International Artists' Books Show, Art Institute of Chicago
- 1979
  - Art for Wearing, San Francisco Museum of Modern Art
- 1978
  - American Illustration: 1800 to the Present, Oakland Art Museum
- 1977
  - The Object as Poet, Smithsonian Institution, Washington D.C.
- 1976
  - California Design II, Pasadena Art Museum
- 1975
  - Images of an Era—The American Poster 1945–75, Corcoran Gallery of Art, Washington, D.C.
- 1974
  - Clothing to be Seen, Museum of Contemporary Craft
- 1973
  - Anatomy in Fabric, Los Angeles County Museum of Art
  - The Fabric of Pop, Victoria & Albert Museum, London
- 1972
  - Block Brush and Stencil, Los Angeles County Museum of Art
- 1970
  - Design Eleven, Pasadena Museum of Modern Art

== Selected permanent collections ==
- Victoria & Albert Museum, London
- The Museum of Modern Art, New York
- The British Museum, London
- Los Angeles County Museum of Art
- Cooper Hewitt, Smithsonian Design Museum, New York
- National Gallery of Art, Washington, D.C.

== Appointment as visiting artist ==
The Womens Center, Los Angeles 1977, 78, 79, 80 Banff Center for the Arts 1980 Visual Studies Workshop, Rochester New York 1983 Art Institute of Chicago, 1986 and 1987 Minnesota Center for Book Arts, 1988 and 1989 Washington D.C. Center for the Book 1992 Jan Van Eyck Akademie, Maastricht, The Netherlands 1994, 1995, 1996

== Conference speaker ==
University of Nebraska: Art of the Book: Impact of Printed Ephemera on Book Design 1981

University of Quebec: Printing Press as an Image-making Tool 1981

Columbia University: Fine Press Conference, Panel on Typography 1982

College Art Association, Washington D.C.: The Look of Heteroglossia 1991

== Collections ==
Victoria and Albert Museum, London, England

Stedelijk Museum, Amsterdam, The Netherlands

The British Library, London, England

The J.P. Getty Museum, Los Angeles, USA

Bayer Collection, Munich Germany

Museum of the Book, Den Haag, The Netherlands

== Grants ==
National Endowment for the Arts: Poltroon Press 1975, 1977, 1980 and Services to the Field, 1979

== Poltroon Press Books ==
[Design, Illustration, Printing, or Writing by FCB]

Confracti Mundi Rudera. Illustrations 1976

Logbook by Tom Raworth. Design and Illustrations 1977

Instead of an Animal by Leslie Scalapino. Design and Illustrations 1978

The Diamond Noodle by Philip Whalen. Illustrations 1980

New Dryads (are Ready for your Call) by Frances Butler 1980

Occult Psychogenic Misfeasance by Frances Butler 1981

Career Options by Frances Butler 1985

Western Excess by Frances Butler 1995

== Selected Articles on printing and the graphic arts ==
Pochoir Illustration. Fine Print. July 1978

The Deceptively Simple Art of Pochoir. Print News, 1981

A Short List of Books about Ornament. Fine Print, April 1982

Real Time and Bookworks. California Bookworks Catalog. Otis Parsons Institute, 1984

The Strip: Comics from the framed to the unframed body. The Ampersand, 1987

Reading Outside the Grid: Designers and Society. Society for Typographic Arts, 1989

Pochoir, a Late 20th Century Revisit. Bookways, October 1992

New Demotic Typography: The search for new indices. Visible Language, 1995
