= Trueblood =

Trueblood is a surname. Notable people with the surname include:

- Benjamin Franklin Trueblood (1847–1916), American pacifist
- D. Elton Trueblood (1900–1994), American Quaker theologian
- Guerdon Trueblood (1933–2021), Costa Rican-American screenwriter
- Jeremy Trueblood (born 1983), American football player
- Kathryn Trueblood, American author
- Kenneth Nyitray Trueblood (1920–1998), American chemist
- Lyda Trueblood (1892–1958), American female suspected serial killer
- Mary Esther Trueblood (1872–1939) was an American mathematician and sociologist
- Paul Trueblood (1935–2012), American pianist
- Robert M. Trueblood, chairman of the Trueblood Committee which attempted to set out the objectives of financial accounting
- Ted Trueblood (1913-1982), American outdoor writer and conservationist
- Thomas Trueblood (1856–1951), American professor of elocution and oratory and the first coach of the University of Michigan golf and debate teams
- Valerie Trueblood, American writer
- Wilbur Trueblood (1874–1937), American architect

== See also ==
- True Blood, an American television series on HBO
