= Julia Jackson =

American Voodoo practitioner

Julia Jackson was a Louisiana Voodoo practitioner from New Orleans.

Alongside Lala, she was an important voodoo queen of the 1940s. She sold gris-gris, charms, and potions. She made her own amulets, talismans, and ingredients. Materials she used in her concoctions included nails, earthworms, coffee grounds, chicken feathers, red pepper, and beef tongue. The instructions for her "To Kill Someone: Formula I" were to kill a rattlesnake and hang it out to dry in the sun. Then the person's name was written on a piece of paper and placed in the snake's mouth. Jackson was feared by the brothel madams of Storyville for her "sealing power".

By 1946, Jackson had purchased half of the property on her block. She also owned a car and traveled extensively in the country.

New Orleans musician Dr. John mentioned Jackson in his song "Jump Sturdy" on his 1968 album Gris-Gris. In the song he says that Jump Sturdy got tangled up with Queen Julia Jackson and died after Jackson "dropped a Zozo la Brique". Jackson confronted him backstage in 1972 and told him that what he had said about her in his song was "a goddamned lie."

Literary figure Ishmael Reed recognized Jackson as a theoretician of Neo-Hoodoo for her role in stripping Voodoo of its Catholic influences. Occultist Black Herman notes that Hoodoo practitioners in North America had to create and refashion loas, citing Jackson's theories as an example.
