= Suzushi Hanayagi =

Japanese dancer and choreographer (1928–2010)

- Born: Mitsuko Kiuchi; August 15, 1928; Osaka, Japan
- Died: October 1, 2010 (aged 82); Osaka, Japam
- Occupations: Dancer and choreographeer

Suzushi Hanayagi (花柳 寿々紫, Hanayagi Suzushi), (August 15, 1928 – October 1, 2010), was a Japanese dancer and choreographer. Born in Osaka, Japan, she found her way in the international art world through her Japanese classical dance theater forms and experimental performance art forms. For more than 50 years she actively performed, taught and choreographed in classic Japanese dance forms and contemporary collaborative multimedia performance works. She appeared in Japan, the United States and Europe as a choreographer. She collaborated on many of famed director and designer Robert Wilson's most revered works created during the years 1984 through 1999.

== Background and career ==
Suzushi Hanayagi was born Mitsuko Kiuchi, in Osaka, Japan, in 1928. At the age of three, she started her dance training with her aunt, Suzukinu Hanayagi, learning the Hanayagi style, a traditional kabuki school of dance founded in the Edo period. At the age of 20, she became a natori, receiving her Hanayagi name after mastering 100 dances. She subsequently began studying with Takehara Han, a master dancer based in Tokyo who developed her singular classic salon style related to mai styles started in Osaka and Kyoto during the Edo period, and incorporating techniques related to Noh theater. Interested in these more abstract and poetic styles, Hanayagi later added studies with Yachiyo Inoue, headmaster of the Inoue school, a Kyoto-based dance style used by geisha, with whom she continued to study until 2000, when she ceased actively performing.

Hanayagi began studying modern dance techniques in Tokyo in the early 1950s, and presented her first modern choreography concert there in 1957, with music by John Cage and contemporary Japanese and European composers. After seeing exhibitions of works by such artists as Jackson Pollock and Willem de Kooning and hearing that artists like Robert Rauschenberg were dancing, she became interested in experiencing the new arts scene happening in New York City.

At the beginning of the 1960s, Hanayagi arrived in the United States as a cultural exchange visitor under programs sponsored by the Martha Graham School and Japan Society. Also during the 1960s, she participated in the performance experiments happening at Anna Halprin's workshops in the San Francisco Bay Area and in New York City with Fluxus and at the Judson Dance Theater. There, she began to collaborate with Carla Blank. Over 17 years, they created 14 dance theater works, which they performed in New York City through 1966, and then in Japan and the San Francisco Bay Area.

She remained a New York resident for most of the 1960s, where in 1962 she met and married visual artist Isamu Kawai, returning to Osaka in 1967 to be near her family for the birth of their son, Asenda Kiuchi. She re-established Osaka as her main residence again in 1969, to have her family's help raising him after their separation and divorce.

Almost yearly, following her return to Japan, she presented classical dance performances in Osaka and Tokyo, frequently at Tokyo's National Theatre. These were either solo concerts or with her sister Suzusetsu Hanayagi and niece Suzusetsumi Hanayagi, as were her classic dance tours in the United States and Europe. In addition, nearly every year from the early 1980s through 1999, she continued to present solo performances of her original work, mainly at the now closed Jean Jean Theatre in Tokyo. These works also often involved collaborations with other artists, including videographer Katsuhiro Yamaguchi, writers Heiner Muller and Ishmael Reed, composers Netty Simons, David Byrne, Takehisa Kosugi, and Hans Peter Kuhn, and visual artists Hirata and Yasuo Ihara.

From 1984 and continuing throughout the 1990s, Hanayagi served as the choreographer for more than 15 seminal productions and projects by stage director and designer Robert Wilson. Their collaborations were mostly large-scale theater and opera productions presented internationally, beginning with the Knee Plays, premiered at the Walker Art Center in Minneapolis as part of Wilson's multi-sectioned work, The Civil Wars: A Tree Is Best Measured When It Is Down. Among other artistic collaborations that occurred throughout her career, Hanayagi appeared with performance artists Yoko Ono and Ayo, and in works directed by filmmaker Molly Davies, choreographer/filmmaker Elaine Summers and director Julie Taymor, besides serving as coach and choreographer for classic dance performances by the popular Japanese actress Shiho Fujimura.

In 2008, when her artist friends learned Hanayagi was ill with Alzheimer's disease and residing in a special care facility in Osaka, Japan, they gathered together to create a multidisciplinary live performance portrait, KOOL-Dancing In My Mind, a poetic monument fueled by their wish to help guarantee her legacy as a great dancer and choreographer. Incorporating six live dancers in reconstructions of her choreographic collaborations from works with Blank and Wilson, besides archival photographs, videos of her in performance, excerpts from various published interviews and unpublished letters to Blank, and recent images of her head, hands and feet by Richard Rutkowski, it was first shown at New York City's Guggenheim Museum in their 2009 Works & Process Series and developed further at Guild Hall in East Hampton, was given its international debut at Berlin's Academy of the Arts in September 2010, and was chosen by Wilson to represent his work at his 2010 Jerome Robbins Award ceremony at New York's Baryshnikov Art Center, December 9, 2010. Also in 2010, the Guggenheim performance became the basis of a 26-minute documentary film KOOL, Dancing in my Mind directed by Richard Rutkowski and Wilson, premiered on ARTE TV in France and Sundance Channel in the U.S. Rutkowski's 65-minute film on Ms. Hanayagi, The Space in Back of You, had its New York premiere at the Film Society of Lincoln Center's 2012 Dance on Camera event, its California premiere at the San Francisco Int'l Asian American film festival and international premiere at Thessaloniki Doc Film Festival in March, 2012.

== Dance styles and legacies ==
In a 1986 interview by Japanese Dance magazine editor Roku Hasegawa, Suzushi Hanayagi said: "[My work] is like a diary. My work is to observe myself and to receive outside stimulation or experiences. I compose my thoughts from these sources. When I used to live in New York I felt a conflict in using separate ways, because the people that I worked with were in different worlds. After returning to Japan I started to study classic dance form again. This time I tried a different way to work. I like it very much. So I feel very natural when I'm doing it. It resolved the conflict. I can use two worlds of dance without mixing. I don't know why I came to admire the conflict. It may be because I become dull or generous. Anyway, I become two worlds with one world. I don't criticize this in myself."

In a 1986 interview, while in residence at American Repertory Theatre in Cambridge, Massachusetts, Hanayagi commented: "When I do classical dance, I don't want to change the movement. I don't want to put my own expression, my own ego, into the classical dance tradition. When I studied with my teacher one-on-one, I felt something very much like Zen meditation; I felt very pure, I didn't feel anything about my own ego or expression."

Robert Wilson has said he discovered, from working with Hanayagi, that abstract movement can generate meaning and that movement can be a counterpoint to language. Hanayagi helped him open up the vocabulary of the gesture and opened Wilson's eyes to the importance of feet and the connection of the body to the ground, impacting the ways Wilson's actors stand and move through space, using their entire bodies to convey meaning. Without her influence, he would not have been able to master the literary texts and operatic pieces that have become such a focus of the latter part of his career.

In an interview published in Japan in the book Odori Wa Jinsei (Dance Is A Life, 2003), Hanayagi was asked why she could work with mixed traditions again and again when working with Robert Wilson. And she answered: "All that I learned from the teachers has become my flesh and blood. And when I am asked to choreograph, it all comes out. When I worked on the choreography for Bob Wilson's Le Martyre de Saint Sebastien, I felt so much responsibility I couldn't sleep the night before -- I was thinking so hard about what I was doing. It's not modern dance, it's not ballet. It isn't anything. It's my original work. Yet it's not mine. It is what was given to me by my teachers."

== List of works ==
=== Solo works, partial listing ===
- 1962: (performed at Hunter Playhouse, January 11, 1962)
  - Song of the Soil, with music by Michio Mamiya
  - Spirit of the Wood, with music by Pierre Henry and Pierre Schaeffer
  - Without Color, with music by Toshiro Mayuzumi
  - Ekagra, with music by Kazuo Fukushima
  - Flying God, with music by Philippe Arthuyet
  - Womb, with music by Karlheinz Stockhausen
  - Action, with music by Mauricio Kagel
- 1963: (premieres performed at Fashion Institute of Technology, April 9, 1962)
  - Tracer, with music Circle of Attitudes by Netty Simons
  - Wood Grain, with music from Karuna by Kazuo Fukushima
  - 9 Heads 1000 Eyes 990 Hands 6 Legs, with music by Teiji Ito
- 1964 (premieres performed in Tokyo, Japan)
  - Echo White, with music by Morton Feldman
  - Double Joint, with music by Karlheinz Stockhausen
  - Steps Stop, with music by Earle Brown
- 1976: Clown
- 1978: Unkind Trotsky, with Down Town Boogie Woogie Band
- 1979:
  - Nonsense
  - Kore I
- 1980: Kore II
- 1981: Kore III
- 1982: Americium 231, with music composed by Netty Simons and Carlos Santana
- 1984: Americium 95
- 1985: Americium 3958, with David Byrne music
- 1986: Americium 225
- 1987: Americium '97 with Libgart Schwarz, 1001 Nacht
- 1989: Americium 225 '89, with composer/artist Hans Peter Kuhn
- 1990: Americium 1931, with composer/artist Hans Peter Kuhn
- 1996: Americium Die, with composer/artist Hans Peter Kuhn
- 1997: Americium/ E.M., with Conjure I, music to texts by Ishmael Reed
- 1998: Americium '98: Black Road to the Vanishing Point, with Conjure II, music to texts by Ishmael Reed
- 1999: Americium '99: Blue of Dance, Picasso blue & Yves Klein blue, based on concept by Ishmael Reed

=== Collaborations with Carla Blank ===
- 1964: Rainbow #4, Fluxus event with Ay-O
- 1965: Spaced
- 1966:
  - Wall St. Journal
  - Sidelights
- 1971-73: Work
- 1972: With Son
- 1973:
  - Ghost Dance
  - Shadow Dance
- 1974:
  - Crowd, with film by Sekio Imura
  - The Lost State of Franklin, collaboration with Ishmael Reed
- 1976: Animuls
- 1977: Trickster Today
- 1979–1981: Kore at Eleusis

=== Collaborations with Robert Wilson ===
- 1984: The Knee Plays, from the CIVIL warS, a collaboration also with composer David Byrne
- 1986:
  - Alceste, based on Euripides' play, with prologue text by Heiner Muller and epilogue music by Laurie Anderson
  - Hamletmachine, a collaboration based on Heiner Muller's text
- 1987:
  - Death, Destruction and Detroit II
  - The Forest, also with composer David Byrne
- 1988:
  - Le Martyre de Saint Sebastien
  - Pelleas et Melisande
- 1989:
  - La Femme a la Cafetiere, a film with Ms. Hanayagi as featured performer
  - De Materie
  - Orlando
- 1990:
  - King Lear
  - Alceste, Puccini's opera
- 1992: Dr. Faustus Lights the Lights, from Gertrude Stein's text
- 1993: Madame Butterfly, an opera by Puccini
- 1999: Death, Destruction and Detroit III: the days before
- 2009: Kool, Dancing in my Mind, also with Carla Blank and Richard Rutkowski

=== Other multimedia collaborations with Suzushi Hanayagi as choreographer, partial listing ===
- 1983: Movements, the first collaboration with videographer Katsuhiro Yamaguchi
- 1988: Arrivals & Departures, a collaboration conceived and directed by Molly Davies, with music composed and performed by Takehisa Kosugi
- 1987: Bitwin, Dance in Media, collaboration with Katsuhiro Yamaguchi, including their video "Ms. Hands and Feet"
- 1988: Oedipus Rex, directed by Julie Taymor with the Japan Philharmonic directed by Seiji Ozawa
- 1994: Sansho the Bailiff. Directed by Andrzej Wajda with sets and costumes by Eiko Ishioka, lighting by Jennifer Tipton, sound by Hans Peter Kuhn, and choreography by Suzushi Hanayagi. Workshops for a live stage performance version based on the film, in fall 1993 at the Brooklyn Academy of Music. A smaller scale workshop was mounted in Los Angeles in spring 1994. Plans to produce the play on Broadway were postponed indefinitely.

=== Films, partial listing ===
- 1975: The Art of Make-Up for the Japanese classical dance; [and] Classical Dance (VHS, 2 hours). Directed by Don MacLennan. Documentary produced by Beate Gordon and Don MacLennan. Suzushi Hanayagi and her sister, Suzusetsu Hanayagi on Juita-mai technique, repertoire, make-up and dressing, with commentary by Beate Gordon. Available in the Performing Arts Research Collection-Dance of New York Public Library at Lincoln Center.
- 1986: It's Clean, It Just Looks Dirty. Film by John Giorno that includes excerpts that document Suzushi Hanayagi choreographing and performing, in 1984, in rehearsals and performance of the Knee Plays, a collaboration with Robert Wilson and David Byrne, at the Walker Art Center, Minneapolis, MN.
- 1989: La Femme à la Cafétière. 6 minutes. Directed by Robert Wilson with Ms. Hanayagi as featured performer. Inspired by a Paul Cezanne painting of the same name, currently in the collection of the Muśee d'Orsay.
- 2009: KOOL, Dancing in My Mind. 30 minutes. Short Documentary. Directed by Richard Rutkowski and Robert Wilson. Produced by Jorn Weisbrodt, Richard Rutkowski and Hisami Kuroiwa. Co-produced by: ARTE and INA. Editing by Keiko Deguchi and Brendan Russell.
- 2011: The Space In Back of You. 68 minutes. Documentary. Directed and with principal cinematography by Richard Rutkowski. Produced by Hisami Kuroiwa and Richard Rutkowski. Principal film editor, Keiku Deguchi. Dramaturge: Carla Blank. Includes interviews with David Byrne, musician; Molly Davies, filmmaker; Anna Halprin, choreographer; Simone Forti, choreographer; Hans Peter Kuhn, composer; Yoshio Yabara, designer; Yachiyo Inoue V, the granddaughter of Ms. Hanayagi's master teacher, Yachiyo Inoue IV, and Carla Blank, choreographer, dramaturge.

=== CD/DVD ===
- 2007: Byrne, David. The Knee Plays. Nonesuch303228-2. Contains Music for the Knee Plays by Robert Wilson and David Byrne, from Robert Wilson's the CIVIL warS: and a slide show of sequential photographs of the entire 57-minute original performance by JoAnn Verburg, taken at the Walker Art Center premiere in Minneapolis in 1984.
