= Carla Blank =

American writer, editor, choreographer, director and dramaturge

- Born: Pittsburgh, Pennsylvania, U.S.
- Education: Carnegie Mellon University; Sarah Lawrence College, B.A.; Mills College, M.A.
- Occupations: Writer, editor, educator, choreographer, dramaturge, and director
- Years active: 1960s–present
- Spouse: Ishmael Reed (m. 1970)
- Website: carlablank.com

Carla Blank is an American writer, editor, educator, choreographer, and dramaturge. Based in the San Francisco Bay Area, for more than four decades she has been a performer, director, and teacher of dance and theater, particularly involved with youth and community arts projects.

Blank is editorial director of the Ishmael Reed Publishing Company, and has also lectured at such educational institutions as the University of California–Berkeley, Dartmouth College, and the University of Washington. She has written and edited a number of books, including Rediscovering America: The Making of Multicultural America, 1900–2000 (2003), Pow-Wow: Charting the Fault Lines in the American Experience, Short Fiction, From Then to Now (2009), Storming the Old Boys' Citadel: Two Pioneer Women Architects of Nineteenth Century North America (2014), Bigotry on Broadway (2021) and A Jew in Ramallah and Other Essays (November 2024).

== Background ==
=== Education and early career ===
Carla Blank was born and grew up in Pittsburgh, Pennsylvania, United States, and after attending Carnegie Mellon University transferred to and graduated from Sarah Lawrence College. Having begun her career as a performer while still a child, after graduation she moved to New York City, where she studied ballet and made her debut as a choreographer in 1963, participating in the avant-garde Judson Dance Theater workshops.

=== Collaborations ===
She collaborated for many years with Suzushi Hanayagi (1928–2010), and in 2009, with director Robert Wilson and others, created a multidisciplinary live performance portrait of Hanayagi entitled KOOL, Dancing in My Mind, which had its premiere at New York City's Guggenheim Museum. A related 26-minute documentary film by Richard Rutkowski and Wilson, with the same title as the live work and including excerpts from the Guggenheim performance, premiered on Arte TV in France and the Sundance Channel in the U.S. in 2010, and an hour-long documentary, The Space in Back of You, including an interview with Blank, premiered in January 2012 at Lincoln Center's film festival, Dance on Camera, where it was nominated for a jury prize.

From 2003 to 2011, Blank was involved with developing The Domestic Crusaders, Wajahat Ali's play about three generations of a Pakistani-American family in the wake of 9/11. Beginning with a staged reading at Mehran Restaurant in Newark, California, in 2004, productions she directed include a 2009 showcase at Berkeley Repertory Theatre and its Off-Broadway debut, on September 11, 2009, at the Nuyorican Poets Café, an appearance at the 2010 MuslimFest in Mississauga, Canada, the Kennedy Center's Millennium Hall in Washington DC, on November 14, 2010, and as anchor of the 9/11 Performance Project at the Gerald W. Lynch Theater in New York, in September 2011.

In 2013, Blank directed an Al-Kasaba Theatre production of Philip Barry's Holiday, performed in Arabic by a cast of Palestinian and Syrian actors. Premiered in their home theater in Ramallah, Palestine, its six-city West Bank tour ended at the Palestinian National Theatre in Jerusalem. In 2016, Blank directed a production of Ishmael Reed's play Mother Hubbard in Xiangtan, China, and in September 2015 she directed News From Fukushima, by Yuri Kageyama, at La Mama Café Theater in New York. She directed the multidisciplinary work by Yuri Kageyama, News From Fukushima: Meditation on an Under-Reported Catastrophe by a Poet, which was premiered at the off-Broadway theater La MaMa in 2015 and developed further in 2017 at Z Space in San Francisco. The 2017 performance became the basis for a 2018 film of the same title, receiving multiple film festival honors internationally including at the New Vision International Film Festival in Amsterdam, Berkeley's Video and Film Festival, the Oniros Film Awards in Italy, and ARS X SDGS.

Blank directed and choreographed The Slave Who Loved Caviar by Ishmael Reed, which premiered at Theater for the New City in New York on December 23, 2021, running until January 9, 2022. Most recently, she directed two showcase productions of Reed's Living Newspaper styled play, The Conductor, at Theater for the New City, in March and August/September, 2023, and a semi-staged virtual reading of his newest play, The Shine Challenge 2024, presented by the Nuyorican Poets Cafe.

=== Performance art teaching ===
Blank has taught Performance Art at Dartmouth College, Harvard's Office of the Arts, and the University of Washington at Seattle, and has lectured on 20th-century art history at the University of California, Berkeley's departments of Dramatic Arts and Interdisciplinary Field Studies. She has lectured and given workshops at the University of Bologna in Italy, Université des Antilles–Guyane in Martinique, Charles University in the Czech Republic, the Naropa Institute's Jack Kerouac School of Disembodied Poetics, the Research Institute for North American Studies of the University of Alcalá, in Spain, and Beijing Normal University in China.

In 1977 she formed Roberts + Blank Dance Theater Inc. with Jody Roberts, whom she met while they were graduate students in the Mills College Dance Department. They first offered classes in dance to children through adults, until forming the Children's Troupe in 1980, a performing company whose members were between six and 19 years of age. The Troupe created original works, often in collaborations with adult guest artists, including choreographer and writer Remy Charlip, playwright and actor Ken Grantham, composers Ed Bogas, Randy Craig, Meredith Monk, Carman Moore and Keith Terry, landscape architect John Roberts, and writer Ishmael Reed. Until 1992, with help from local foundation and government grants, these works were performed in schools, museums, theaters, libraries, parks, shopping malls, senior centers, and community arts centers and festivals. The works incorporated movement (folk dance, modern dance, ballet, and social dance forms) and theater forms (from traditional forms like Mummers Plays, shadow plays, mime, puppetry, and scripts to cutting-edge performance art techniques), their repertoire including Horse Ballet, whose dance score adhered to the style of equestrian pageants popular in the palace courts of 17th-century Europe.

Based upon her experiences of teaching and directing young artists, Blank co-authored a performance arts handbook, Live On Stage!, with Jody Roberts (1997 and 2000, Dale Seymour Publications). It is intended to help classroom teachers integrate arts into their basic curriculum, offering an ecumenical approach that mixes performing arts traditions from around the world, making cross-disciplinary connections and generally expanding concepts of theater training to include traditional and experimental techniques, while still fulfilling the guidelines of the National Standards for Arts Education. The anthology received statewide adoptions for middle-school use in North Carolina, Tennessee, Mississippi and Idaho, and has been referenced in various school districts’ curriculum guides in the U.S. and Canada, including the Yale-New Haven Teacher's Institute and the Cambridge Public School Drama Collaborative, developed with Harvard University's Office of the Arts.

=== Writing and editing ===
Blank has written or been the editor of several other books, including in 2003 Rediscovering America: The Making of Multicultural America, 1900–2000, which "explores the lost history of America, highlighting and reintegrating the complex contributions of women, African, Asian, Hispanic, and Native Americans, immigrants, artists, renegades, rebels, rogues, and others normally cast to the margins of history books, but without whom there is no honest accounting of American history." Among her other published titles are Storming the Old Boys' Citadel: Two Pioneer Women Architects of Nineteenth Century North America (Baraka Books, 2014), co-authored with architectural historian Tania Martin, which chronicles the careers of Louise Blanchard Bethune and Mother Joseph du Sacré-Coeur – a work about which The Montreal Review of Books said: "Books like this one are vital in highlighting what our history notes have left out. They remind us to redefine our views and question our records. If we need to redefine the history of architecture today, let it include women."

Anthologies that Blank has co-edited with Ishmael Reed include Bigotry on Broadway, released by Baraka Books of Montreal in September 2021, and PowWow: Charting the Fault Lines in the American Experience, Short Fiction, From Then to Now (2009), described by the Los Angeles Times as "big, diverse, messy, all over the place -- just like American literature itself." According to Publishers Weekly, it is "a captivating, multifarious look at the American experience through its short fiction", while January Magazine called it "an important book ... a collection intended to mark our consciousness and our hearts."

Over the years, she has been a contributor to such publications as CounterPunch, El País, The Green Magazine, Hungry Mind Review, The Wall Street Journal, San Francisco Chronicle, Alta, and Konch Magazine. Selected essays, from 2003 to 2024, are collected in A Jew in Ramallah and Other Essays.

=== Ishmael Reed Publishing ===
As editorial director of Ishmael Reed Publishing, she has had charge of poetry and prose projects including 25 New Nigerian Poets (2000, edited by Toyin Adewale) and Short Stories by 16 Nigerian Women (2003, edited by Toyin Adewale-Gabriel), which have both been translated into Arabic by the National Center for Translation, in Egypt. Other titles Blank has supervised include Black Girl from Tannery Flats (2003), the memoir of her mother-in-law, Thelma V. Reed; New and Collected Poems by Kathryn Takara (2003), poetry collections from four women poets based in northern California: Under Burning White Sky (2005) by Boadiba, Swallowing Watermelons by Karla Brundage (2006), City Beautiful by Tennessee Reed (2006), and After Altamira by Neli Moody (2006); and Maggie 3, a novel by Alison Mills Newman (2007).

In 2011, the press published New and Selected Yuri, a collection of poetry and fiction by Japan-based writer Yuri Kageyama; in 2013 a new collection of poetry, Paper Gods and Rebels, by San Francisco-based writer Genny Lim; and in 2015 and 2017 published the first and second collections of poetry by Alaska-based Tlingit/Iñupiaq writer Ishmael Hope, Courtesans of Flounder Hill and Rock Piles Along the Eddy. In 2018, the press released King Comus, a formerly unpublished novel by the late William Demby, which the HuffPost designated "Rediscovered Novel of the Year". In 2023, the press released Guayacán, a new poetry collection by Victor Hernández Cruz.

== Personal life ==
Blank has been married since 1970 to Ishmael Reed, whom she met in 1965. She has worked with Reed on a range of projects and books, in addition to her independent career. With Reed in the roles of jazz pianist and bandleader, she plays violin in the Ishmael Reed Quintet, having begun studying the violin as a child, in Pittsburgh, Pennsylvania, with Mihail Stolarevsky, making her recording debut on the CD For All We Know. She lives in Oakland, California, with her husband and their daughter, Tennessee Reed, who is also a writer.

== Selected bibliography ==
=== Non-fiction ===
- With Jody Roberts, Live On Stage!, 2 volumes, in Teacher Resource and Student editions, Dale Seymour Publications, 1996, 2000, ISBN 978-1572323742
- Rediscovering America: The Making of Multicultural America, 1900–2000, Three Rivers Press (an imprint of Random House), 2003, ISBN 0-609-80784-6.
- With Tania Martin, Storming the Old Boys’ Citadel: Two Pioneer Women Architects of Nineteenth Century North America, Baraka Books, 2014, ISBN 978-1771860130.
- A Jew in Ramallah and Other Essays, Baraka Books, November 2024, ISBN 978-1-77186-356-8.

=== As contributing editor ===
- With Ishmael Reed, Califia, The California Poetry, Yardbird Publishing Company, 1979, ISBN 978-0931676031.
- With Ishmael Reed, MultiAmerica, Essays on Cultural Wars and Cultural Peace, Viking, 1997 ISBN 978-0670867530.
- With Ishmael Reed, From Totems to Hip-Hop: A Multicultural Anthology of Poetry Across the Americas, 1900–2002, Thunder's Mouth Press, 2003. ISBN 978-1560255000

=== As editor ===
- With Ishmael Reed, Pow-Wow: Charting the Fault Lines in the American Experience, Short Fiction, From Then to Now, Da Capo Press, 2009, ISBN 978-1-56858-342-6.
- With Ishmael Reed, Bigotry on Broadway Baraka Books, 2021, ISBN 978-1-77186-256-1.

=== Film and video documentation of Blank's work, and interviews with Blank ===
- (2021) The Making of The Domestic Crusaders, 28:05-minute documentary includes interview with playwright Wajahat Ali, director Carla Blank, producers Ishmael Reed and Rome Neal of the 2009 Nuyorican Poets Cafe production.
- (2018) News From Fukushima: Meditation on an Under-Reported Catastrophe by a Poet. 1 hour, 15 minutes. Yoshiaki Tago's documentation of Yuri Kageyama's multidisciplinary live performance work at Z Space in San Francisco, directed by Carla Blank.
- (2011) The Space in Back of You. 68-minute documentary. Premiered at the 2012 Lincoln Center film festival, Dance on Camera, New York. Directed and with principal cinematography by Richard Rutkowski. Produced by Hisami Kuroiwa and Richard Rutkowski. Principal film editor, Keiku Deguchi. Dramaturge: Carla Blank. Includes interviews with David Byrne, musician; Molly Davies, filmmaker; Anna Halprin, choreographer; Simone Forti, choreographer; Hans Peter Kuhn, composer; Yoshio Yabara, designer; Yachiyo Inoue V, the granddaughter of Ms. Hanayagi's master teacher, Yachiyo Inoue IV, and Carla Blank, choreographer, dramaturge.
- (2009) KOOL, Dancing in My Mind. 30-minute documentary. Directed by Richard Rutkowski and Robert Wilson. Produced by Jorn Weisbrodt, Rutkowski and Hisami Kuroiwa. Co-produced by ARTE and INA. Editing by Keiko Deguchi and Brendan Russell. Based upon documentation of a 2009 performance work of the same name, which premiered at NYC's Guggenheim Museum, which was a collaboration by Wilson, Rutkowski and Blank.
- (2007) Sally Gross - The Pleasure of Stillness, 60-minute documentary. Albert Maysles and Kristen Nutile, directors; Tanja Meding, producer. Includes interview with Carla Blank.
- (1992) The Only Language She Knows, 20-minute kitchen drama by Genny Lim. Performed by Genny Lim and A. J. Lee. Videography by Allen Willis. Music by Francis Wong. Directed by Carla Blank. Produced by Ishmael Reed.
