= Before Columbus Foundation =

Organization

- Founded: 1976; 50 years ago
- Founder: Ishmael Reed
- Website: www.beforecolumbusfoundation.com

The Before Columbus Foundation is a nonprofit organization founded in 1976 by Ishmael Reed, "dedicated to the promotion and dissemination of contemporary American multicultural literature". The Foundation makes annual awards for books published in the US during the previous year that make contributions to American multicultural literature.

== History ==
Adhering to its founding grant's requirement that he have a partner, Reed chose poet Victor Hernández Cruz, now a chancellor of the Academy of American Poets. Next to become directors were Shawn Wong, novelist and former chair of the English Department at the University of Washington in Seattle, and Presidential medal recipient Rudolfo Anaya. The foundation, named after Ivan van Sertima's book They Came before Columbus (1976), began as a multi-cultural distribution project, but evolved into a service organization devoted to the recognition of Hispanic, African-American, and Native American authors whose literature of quality might be neglected by the literary mainstream, which, according to the directors, continues to be segregated and fifty years behind the south in terms of diversity—a mainstream that limits its inclusion of minorities to tokenism. Through classrooms, poetry readings, symposia, and publications the foundation has met this goal. In 1980, a recording of a reading presented by the Foundation at the Oakland Museum, featuring 14 poets led by Ishmael Reed (with Amiri Baraka, Jayne Cortez, Joy Harjo, David Henderson, Victor Hernández Cruz, David Meltzer, and others), was released on the Smithsonian Folkways label.

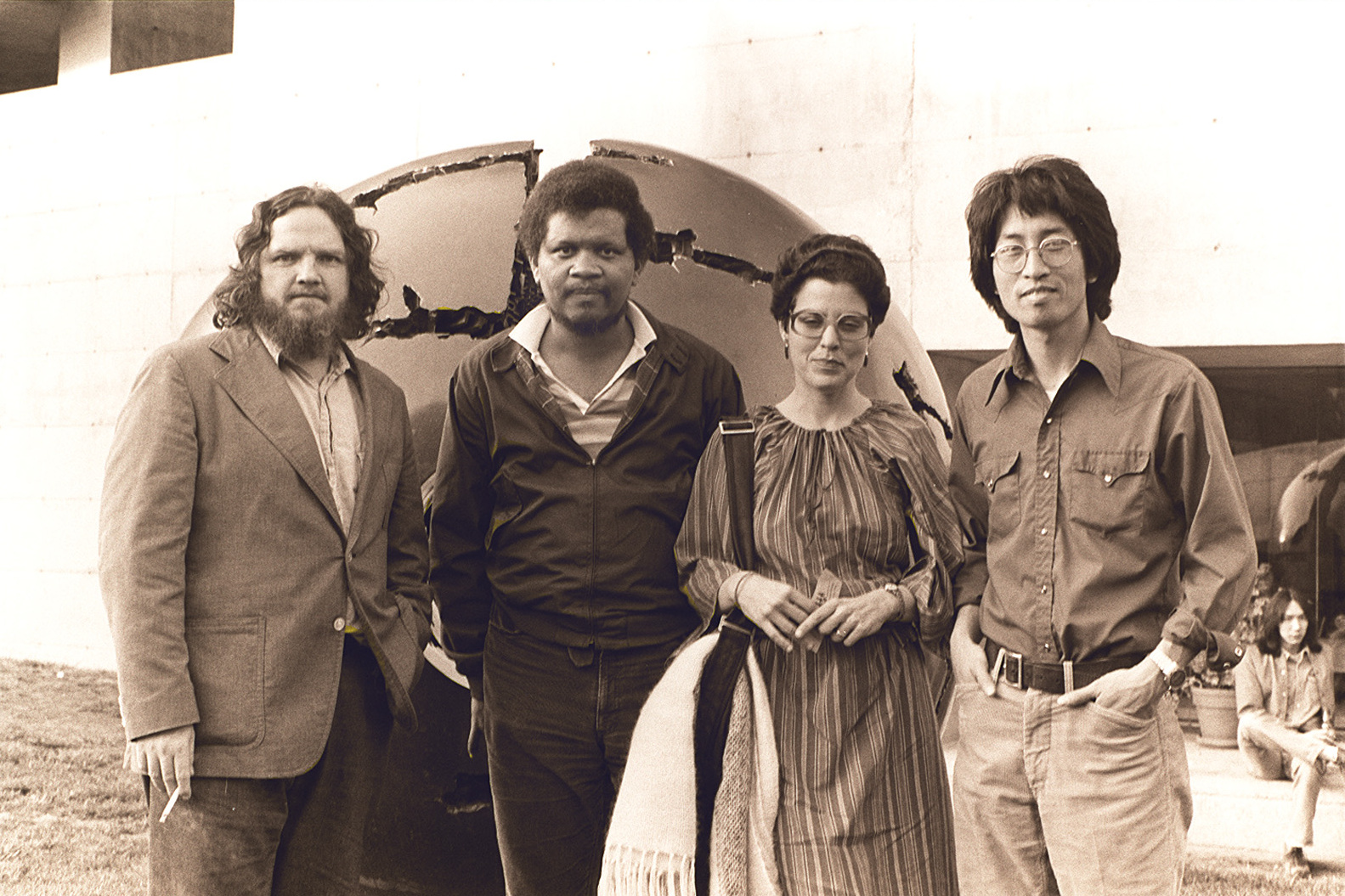
From left: editor Bob Callahan, writer Ishmael Reed, Carla Blank, a play director and Reed's wife, with novelist Shawn Wong at right.

== American Book Awards ==
In 1980, Ishmael Reed suggested that there be an American Book Awards to challenge the lack of diversity in the Pulitzer Prizes and the National Book Awards. The first awards ceremony was held at The West Side Community Center. In the following year, Public Theater director Joseph Papp hosted the American Book Awards in New York. The master of ceremonies was Quincy Troupe. Among the presenters were Nobel Laureate Toni Morrison and writer Donald Barthelme. The American Book Awards have been held in Los Angeles, Chicago, New Orleans, Seattle, San Francisco, Oakland, Miami, and Washington, D.C., where they were held at the National Press Club, and arranged by the late Daniel Shore. Awards are given annually for books published in the US during the previous year that make contributions to American multicultural literature.

In 1992, the Beyond Columbus Foundation published two anthologies of award-winning selections (one poetry and one fiction). Though severely underfunded, it has survived through what Executive Director Gundars Strads called "blind persistence". Its directors are drawn from the Black, Hispanic, Italian, Irish and Jewish communities. One of the current directors is Juan Felipe Herrera, Poet Laureate of California from 2012 to 2014 and US Poet Laureate from 2015 to 2017.
