= Louis of Clermont =

Louis of Clermont or Louis de Clermont may refer to:

- Louis I, Count of Blois, also count of Clermont-en-Beauvaisis (1191–1205)
- Louis I, Duke of Bourbon, also count of Clermont-en-Beauvaisis (1317–1327, 1331–1342)
- Louis II, Duke of Bourbon, also count of Clermont-en-Beauvaisis (1356–1410)
- Louis d'Estaing, bishop of Clermont (1650–1664)
- Louis de Balzac d'Illiers d'Entragues, bishop of Clermont (1716–1717)
- Louis, Count of Clermont, being Clermont-en-Argonne (1709–1771)
- Lewis de Claremont, pseudonym, American occultist author (fl. 1930s)
