= Catherine Yronwode =

American comic book writer and editor (born 1947)

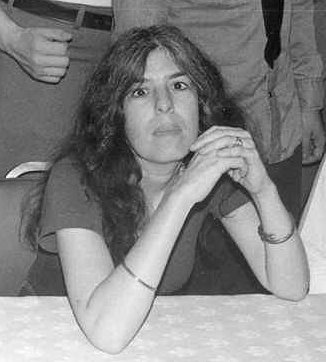
- Yronwode in 1977
- Born: Catherine Anna Manfredi; May 12, 1947 (age 79); San Francisco, California, U.S.
- Occupations: Writer, editor, publisher
- Notable work: Eclipse Comics editor-in-chief
- Spouses: Dean Mullaney (m. 1987; div. 1993) Nagasiva Bryan W Yronwode (m. 2000)
- Awards: Inkpot Award 1983

Catherine Anna Yronwode (née Manfredi; May 12, 1947) is an American writer, editor, graphic designer, typesetter, and publisher with an extensive career in the comic book industry. She is also a practitioner of folk magic.

== Early life ==
Catherine Anna Manfredi was born in 1947 in San Francisco. Her father was Joseph Manfredi, a Sicilian American abstract artist, and her mother, Liselotte Erlanger, a writer, was an Ashkenazi Jewish refugee from Nazi Germany. She is a cousin of the composer Franz Reizenstein and the economist Otto Eckstein. Manfredi grew up in Berkeley and Santa Monica, and traveling abroad.

She attended Shimer College in Illinois as an early entrant, but dropped out. Returning to Berkeley, she sold the Berkeley Barb underground newspaper on the streets and catalogued rare books for her parents' bookstore. In 1965 she left urban life for rural places.

== Career ==
=== Early writing ===
Yronwode began writing while in her teens, contributing to science fiction fanzines during the 1960s. In 1968 she was a member of the Berkeley Astrology Guild, co-writing a weekly astrology column for an underground newspaper, the San Francisco Express Times under the collective pseudonym Stella A.G. Freebody. She produced record reviews on a freelance basis for the nascent Rolling Stone magazine, and short articles on low-tech living for the Whole Earth Catalog and Country Women magazine. While in jail for growing marijuana, she wrote about her experiences ("Letters from Jail") for the Spokane Natural newspaper. With her mother Liselotte Glozer, Catherine co-wrote and hand-lettered the faux-medieval cookbook, My Lady's Closet Opened and the Secret of Baking Revealed by Two Gentlewomen (Glozer's Booksellers, 1969).

Describing herself as "one of those girls who took a look around at what the boys were doing", she quickly became an avid reader of Marvel Comics' Silver Age material, beginning with Fantastic Four and The Amazing Spider-Man. Doctor Strange soon became her favourite, and when the initial series was cancelled in 1969 she gave up reading comics for several years. The same year, she and her then-partner Peter Paskin created the joint name "Yronwode" and all of her subsequent work has been published under that surname. She generally styles her name in lower case, as "catherine yronwode." or even "cat ⊕ yronwode" (pronounced 'iron-wood').

=== Comics career ===
==== Early comics work ====
The 1974 revival of Doctor Strange drew Yronwode back to comics. While unemployed in 1977, Yronwode created a magico-religious index to the comic called the Lesser Book of the Vishanti; she later published parts of it in various small presses and it is posted on her website in updated form. Marvel writers are said to have consulted it. She wrote a lengthy letter to the title in 1978, which took over nearly the entire column; Yronwode's address was printed in the column, and she received large amounts of fan mail, including a marriage proposal. At this point she had separated from Paskin and was living alone in a log cabin in Missouri, so she wrote back to many of the letters and would keep in touch with many of the writers. Yronwode began a career as a freelance magazine writer while also continuing to contribute to fanzines.

In 1980, Yronwode began work at Ken Pierce Books, editing and writing introductions to a line of comic strip reprint books. Titles included Modesty Blaise by Peter O'Donnell and Jim Holdaway, Mike Hammer by Mickey Spillane, and The Phantom by Lee Falk.

==== Fit to Print ====
Also in 1980 Yronwode succeeded Murray Bishoff as news reporter for Comics Buyer's Guide and began a long-running column "Fit to Print," presenting a variety of industry news, reviews, obituaries, and opinion pieces. Tales of the Beanworld creator Larry Marder credits her positive review for his title's success. Similarly, when Dan Brereton received a poor review from Yronwode for an early project, he felt his "promising career in comics was over." The column, and her work with the APA-I comic-book indexing cooperative, led to freelance editing jobs at Kitchen Sink Press. She wrote The Art of Will Eisner in 1981 and produced several other books for Kitchen Sink over the next few years.

==== Eclipse Comics ====
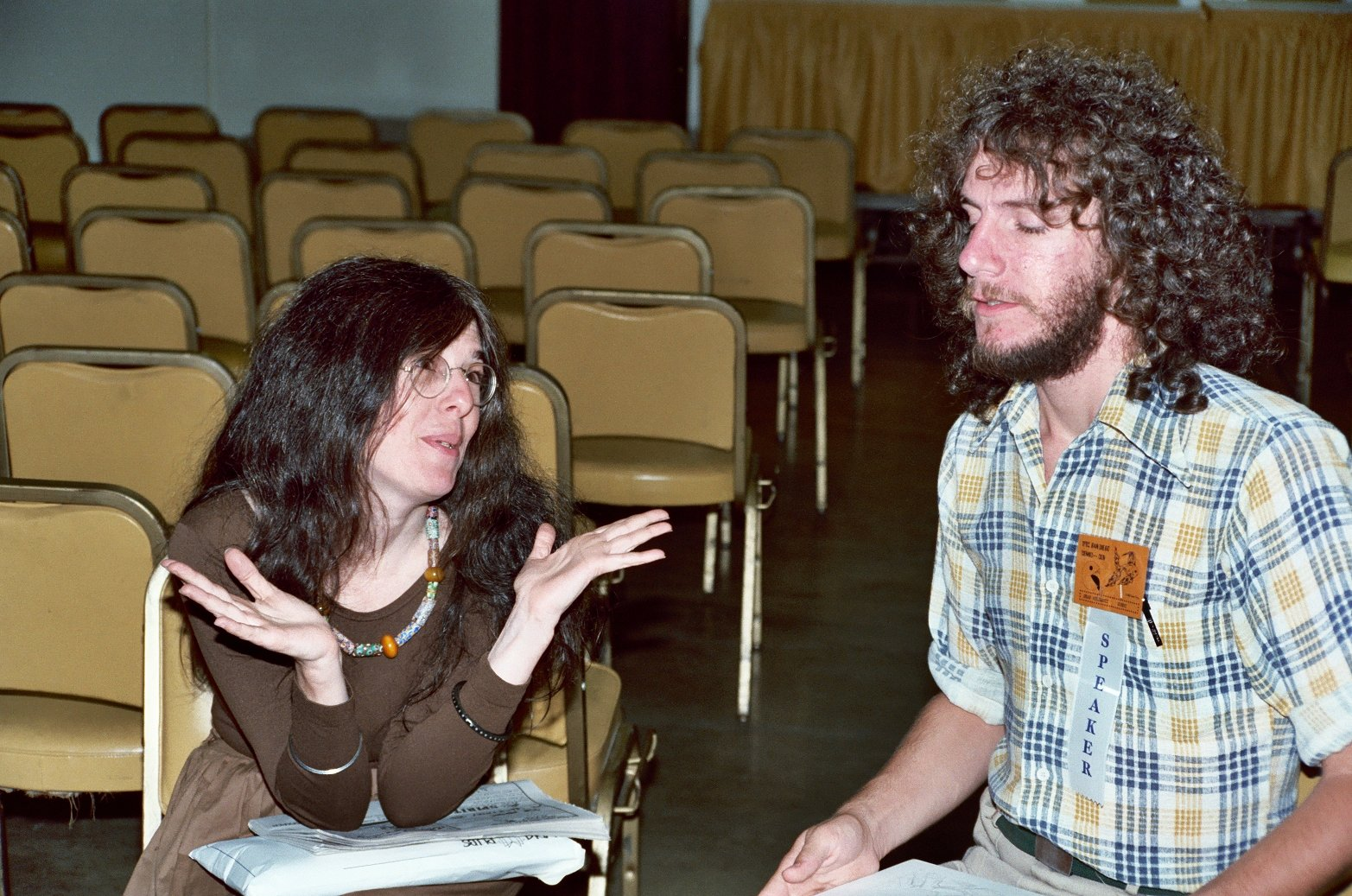
Yronwode and Dean Mullaney at the 1982 San Diego Comic Con.

While working at Eisner's archives in December 1981, she met Dean Mullaney, the co-founder of Eclipse Enterprises, a graphic novel publisher. Yronwode recalled that Eisner and his wife Ann "hosted a party for me with all these comic book men I was flirting with. All these men came up; they all wanted to meet Will. One of them was Dean Mullaney, the co-owner of Eclipse Comics, a small independent publishing house. He was the most flirtatious." As well as beginning a romantic relationship, the pair also began working together; Dean and his brother Jan were looking to expand beyond graphic novels to regular comics while retaining the creator-owned ethos, and Yronwode's knowledge of comics and wide list of contacts saw her effectively become the company's editor-in-chief, starting with Destroyer Duck. She was in the post unofficially for around a year; she and Mullaney also kept their relationship private to avoid accusations she had only gotten the job because they were lovers.

When Yronwode officially took over as Editor-in-Chief in October 1984, Dean Mullaney moved over to the role of publisher. She quickly became the public face of the company at conventions and other events, and began a column called Penumbra that was printed on the inside cover of all of Eclipse's comic books, while continuing to write Fit to Print. Penumbra would mix promotion of Eclipse's titles with industry musings and other topical comment. She remained outspoken, often criticising the editorial and business policies of both Marvel and DC Comics. At her instigation, Eclipse ran a series of full-page advertisements during 1986 (Marvel's much-publicized 25th anniversary) featuring a large portrait of Jack Kirby and the text "What About Jack?", in reference to the company's refusal to return the artist's artwork.

In 1983, after a brief stop-over in Missouri, Yronwode and Dean Mullaney relocated Eclipse's publishing operations to Guerneville, California; in early 1984, Jan Mullaney sold his interest in the company to the pair in order to concentrate on his music career. Eclipse's output rapidly grew, and by the mid-1980s they were the third-largest company in the American comics industry, despite only selling their titles via the direct market. Through a mixture of a booming industry, a growing creator-owned movement, Dean Mullaney's business acumen, and Yronwode's intricate knowledge of the market, the company published numerous award-winning titles, including Scott McCloud's Zot!, Mark Evanier's The DNAgents and Alan Moore's Miracleman, as well as importing numerous titles from the United Kingdom and Japan for the American market. In 1983, Yronwode won an Inkpot Award, given for lifetime achievement in comics and related areas.

Yronwode and the cartoonist Trina Robbins co-wrote Women and the Comics in 1985; the book was a history of female comics creators. As the first book on this subject, its publication was noted both by the mainstream press and the fan press. Yronwode was writing another non-fiction book, a biography of Steve Ditko, but the work was lost when Eclipse's offices were flooded in February 1986. Yronwode covered the events - which included herself and Mullaney losing most of their possessions when their house also flooded - in Fit to Print and Penumbra columns. The events would be alluded to in a tongue-in-cheek framing sequence Yronwode wrote for Miracleman #8.

With the comic market contracting in the late 1980s, Eclipse developed a new line of non-fiction, non-sports trading cards, edited by Yronwode. Controversial political subjects such as the Iran-Contra scandal, the Savings and Loan crisis, the AIDS epidemic, and the Kennedy Assassination, as well as true crime accounts of serial killers, mass murderers, the mafia, and organized crime were covered in these card sets. Yronwode was widely interviewed in the media about her role in their creation.

In 1993, Yronwode and Mullaney divorced, at which point the company's finances disintegrated, leading to bankruptcy for the company in 1995.

===== Legal cases =====
During her time at Eclipse, Yronwode was involved in three court cases related to free speech/free expression under the First Amendment.

- In the 1986 Illinois v. Correa obscenity case, which led to the founding of the Comic Book Legal Defense Fund, Yronwode was an expert witness for the defense.
- In 1992, the convicted serial killer Kenneth Bianchi, one-half of the pair known as the Hillside Stranglers, sued Yronwode for US$8.5 million for having an image of his face depicted on a trading card; he claimed his face was his trademark. The judge dismissed the case after ruling that, if Bianchi had been using his face as a trademark when he was killing women, he would not have tried to hide it from the police.
- Also in 1992, Eclipse was a plaintiff when Nassau County, New York, seized a crime-themed trading card series of theirs under a county ordinance prohibiting sales of certain trading cards to minors. The case, in which Yronwode testified and the American Civil Liberties Union provided Eclipse's representation, reached the 2nd Circuit U.S. Court of Appeals. It ruled against the county, overturning the ordinance.

==== Claypool Comics ====
Following the end of Eclipse, Yronwode joined Claypool Comics. In 1998, she was joined at Claypool by Tyagi Nagasiva. They married in 2000, at which time he changed his name to Nagasiva Bryan W. Yronwode. Both Yronwodes continued to work for Claypool until that company ceased print publication in 2007.

=== Other work ===
During the 1990s, Yronwode was a staff editor and contributor to Organic Gardening Magazine and wrote The California Gardener's Book of Lists (Taylor, 1998). Other subjects she has covered include collectibles, popular culture, rural acoustic blues music, early rock'n'roll, sexuality, magic, sacred architecture, the worldwide use of charms and talismans, African American hoodoo, and other folklore subjects. She runs the websites luckymojo.com, herbmagic.com, southern-spirits.com, and missionaryindependent.org, which deal with these and other topics, including comic books.

She is the co-proprietor, with her husband Nagasiva Yronwode, of the Lucky Mojo Curio Company, an occult shop, spiritual supply manufactory, book publishing firm, and internet radio network for which she writes, edits, and produces graphic label art. She is on the board of the Yronwode Institution for the Preservation and Popularization of Indigenous Ethnomagicology (YIPPIE), a 501(c)3 not-for-profit foundation that archives the material culture of 19th and 20th century folk magic and divination. Since 2006, she has been a pastor at Missionary Independent Spiritual Church. Under the imprints of the Lucky Mojo Curio Company, Missionary Independent Spiritual Church, and YIPPIE, the Yronwodes edit and publish books by a variety of other authors as well as their own works. Extensive interviews with the Yronwodes can be found in Christine Wicker's survey of early 21st-century magical practitioners, Not in Kansas Anymore, and in Carolyn Morrow Long's academic history of 20th-century occult shops, Spiritual Merchants: Religion, Magic, and Commerce.

== Personal life ==
From 1965 to 1980, Yronwode lived as a rural back-to-the-land hippie at Tolstoy Peace Farm, an anarchist commune in Washington; the Equitable Farm commune in Mendocino County, California, and the Garden of Joy Blues commune in Oregon County, Missouri.

In 1967, Yronwode began a relationship with Peter Paskin; in 1969, they devised the new surname Yronwode. In 1970, they were interviewed at length by Rolling Stone magazine for an article on hippie anarchist communes.

The couple had two children: Cicely (who was born in 1970 and died of SIDS the same year) and Althaea, born in 1971. In 1972, the Yronwodes relocated to the Garden of Joy Blues commune in the Missouri Ozarks. Their partnership ended in 1976.

After working and living together from 1981 onward, Yronwode and Dean Mullaney married in 1987. They divorced in 1993.

Yronwode lives on an old farmstead in rural Forestville, California, in "tantric partnership" with Nagasiva Bryan W Yronwode. They met in 1998 and married in 2000.

== Publications ==
- My Lady's Closet Opened and the Secret of Baking Revealed, by Two Gentlewomen (with Liselotte Erlanger Glozer). Glozer's Booksellers, 1969.
- The Lesser Book of the Vishanti, 1977, rev. 2002, various private publishers.
- Will Eisner Color Treasury (with Will Eisner). Kitchen Sink Press,1981. ISBN 0-87816-006-X
- The Art of Will Eisner. Kitchen Sink Press, 1982. ISBN 0-87816-004-3
- Women and the Comics (with Trina Robbins). Eclipse, 1983. ISBN 0-913035-01-7
- The Outer Space Spirit: 1952 (with Will Eisner, Wally Wood, and Pete Hamill). Kitchen Sink Press, 1989. ISBN 0-87816-012-4
- The California Gardener's Book of Lists (with Eileen Smith). Taylor Publishing, 1998. ISBN 0-87833-964-7
- Hoodoo Herb and Root Magic. Lucky Mojo, 2002. ISBN 0-9719612-0-4
- Hoodoo Rootwork Correspondence Course. Lucky Mojo, 2006. ISBN 0-9719612-2-0
- Throwing the Bones: Foretelling the Future With Bones, Shells, and Nuts. Lucky Mojo, 2012. ISBN 978-0971961234
- The Art of Hoodoo Candle Magic in Rootwork, Conjure, and Spiritual Church Services (with Mikhail Strabo). Missionary Independent Spiritual Church, 2013. ISBN 0-9836483-6-0
- The Black Folder: Personal Communications on the Mastery of Hoodoo (editor / contributor, with 17 other authors). Missionary Independent Spiritual Church, 2013. ISBN 978-0-9836483-7-6
- Paper in My Shoe: Name Papers, Petition Papers, and Prayer Papers in the Hoodoo Rootwork Tradition. Lucky Mojo, 2015. ISBN 978-0996147101
- Legends of Incense, Herb, and Oil Magic: Esoteric Students' Handbook of Legendary Formulas and Facts by Lewis de Claremont, Restored, Revised, and Edited by catherine yronwode. Lucky Mojo, 2016. ISBN 978-0-9961471-1-8
- This Amazing Book - Hoodoo Herb and Root Medicine - Opens the Door to Better Health by Sunrae Products Co., Restored, Revised, and Edited by catherine yronwode. Lucky Mojo, 2017. ISBN 978-0-9961471-6-3
- The Art of Making Mojos: How to Craft Conjure Hands, Trick Bags, Tobies, Gree-Grees, Jomos, Jacks, and Nation Sacks. Lucky Mojo, 2018. ISBN 978-0-9997809-0-9
- Genuine Black and White Magic of Marie Laveau (with Zora Neale Hurston, Anna Riva, Anne Fleitman (Henri Gamache), Larry B. Wright, Franz Hartmann, Abe Plough, et al.). Lucky Mojo, 2018. ISBN 978-0-9997809-2-3
- The Secret of Numbers Revealed. (with Dr. Roy Page Walton, Lewis de Claremont, Godfrey Spencer, and Frank Householder). Lucky Mojo, 2019. ISBN 978-0-9997809-3-0
- The Red Folder: Private Lessons on the Practice of Hoodoo (editor / contributor, with 48 other authors). Missionary Independent Spiritual Church, 2019. ISBN 978-0-9960523-6-8
- Secrets of the Crystal Silence League: Crystal Ball Gazing, The Master Key to Silent Influence. (with Claude Alexander Conlin and Deacon Millett). Missionary Independent Spiritual Church, 2019. ISBN 978-0-9960523-5-1
- Bottle Up and Go!: The Magic of Hoodoo Container Spells in Boxes, Bags, Bowls, Buckets, and Jars. (with Lara Rivera). Lucky Mojo, 2020. ISBN 978-0-9997809-4-7
- The Stranger in the Cup: How to Read Your Luck and Fate in the Tea Leaves. (with Gregory Lee White). Lucky Mojo, 2020. ISBN 978-0-9997809-6-1
- Terrors of the Evil Eye Exposed: Protection From Evil. (with Henri Gamache and Dr. Jeremy Weiss). Lucky Mojo, 2021. ISBN 978-0-9997809-8-5
- How to Use Amulets, Charms, and Talismans in the Hoodoo and Conjure Tradition: Physical Magic for Protection, Health, Money, Love, and Long Life. (with Gregory Lee White). Lucky Mojo, 2021. ISBN 978-0-9997809-9-2
- Down-Home Sex Magic: Hoodoo Spells of Bodily Love. Lucky Mojo, 2021. ISBN 978-0-9997809-7-8
- Hoodoo Dolls and Effigies: How to Craft and Cast Spells with Poppets, Fetishes, and Voodoo Dolls in the African-American Conjure Tradition. Lucky Mojo, 2022. ISBN 978-1-7376516-2-8
- Sneaky Tricks: How to Hide Your Hoodoo Spells in Plain Sight. (with Miss Michaele). Lucky Mojo, 2023. ISBN 978-1-7376516-3-5
- Astrology for Rootworkers: Spell-Casting with the Zodiac in Hoodoo and Conjure. (with Prof. A. F. Seward). Lucky Mojo, 2023. ISBN 978-1-7376516-4-2
