= Mumbo Jumbo (novel) =

1972 novel by Ishmael Reed

- First edition
- Author: Ishmael Reed
- Language: English
- Publisher: Doubleday
- Publication date: 1972
- Publication place: United States
- Media type: Print
- ISBN: 0-385-05675-3
- OCLC: 35158152
- Preceded by: Yellow Back Radio Broke-Down
- Followed by: The Last Days of Louisiana Red

Mumbo Jumbo is a 1972 novel by Ishmael Reed. It centers on a dance mania and spiritual ″anti-plague″ of African origin called Jes’ Grew, whose spread across the United States brings about the Jazz Age. The action takes place in the 1920s New York, where Papa LaBas, a Vodou practitioner, searches for a sacred anthology that will allow Jes’ Grew to “go pandemic.” He is opposed by a secret society called the Atonist order, which seeks to destroy Jes’ Grew in the name of protecting their Eurocentric vision of Western civilization.

The novel uses myth, allegory, conspiracy, and caricature to satirically reimagine the Harlem Renaissance, in a style that is generally considered postmodern. One of its main themes is the relationship between African-American culture and American culture more broadly—in particular, recurring cycles of appreciation and marginalization. Another is cultural appropriation, including both the mainstream assimilation of black creative expression and the struggle of black artists to adapt traditionally Western forms. Reed’s portrayal of both dynamics is informed by spirit possession in Vodou, whose syncretism he embraced as a literary model in his 1970 poem “Neo-HooDoo Manifesto.”

Mumbo Jumbo was nominated for the 1973 National Book Award for Fiction after its publication by Doubleday in 1972. Reed’s best known novel, it has been translated into several languages, and was rereleased as a Penguin Modern Classic in 2017. It has been cited as an influence by a wide range of writers, artists, and scholars, including Thomas Pynchon, Colson Whitehead, Parliament-Funkadelic, and Henry Louis Gates Jr., whose reading of the novel inspired his theory of the African-American literary tradition in The Signifying Monkey.

== Text ==
Set in 1920s New York City, the novel depicts the elderly Harlem houngan PaPa LaBas and his companion Black Herman racing against the Wallflower Order, an international conspiracy dedicated to monotheism and control, as they attempt to root out the cause of and deal with the "Jes Grew" virus, a personification of ragtime, jazz, polytheism, and freedom. The Wallflower Order is said to work in concert with an extant Knights Templar Order to prevent people from dancing, to end the dance crazes spreading among black people. The virus is spread by certain black artists, referred to in the novel as "Jes Grew Carriers" or "J.G.C.s."

Historical, social, and political events mingle freely with fictional inventions. The United States' occupation of Haiti, attempts by whites to suppress jazz music, and the widespread belief that president Warren Harding had black ancestry are mingled with a plot in which the novel's hero, PaPa LaBas, searches for a mysterious book that has disappeared with black militant Abdul Sufi Hamid (whose name reflects that of the Harlem street corner radical preacher Sufi Abdul Hamid, a.k.a. Eugene Brown, an early black convert to Islam), as a group of radicals plans to return museum treasures looted from ancient Egypt to Africa, and the Atonists within the Wallflower Order are trying to locate and train the perfect "Talking Android", a black man who will renounce African-American culture in favor of European American culture. One of the supporting characters, an ally of PaPa LaBas, is Black Herman (Benjamin Rucker, 1892–1934), an actual African-American stage magician and root doctor. Another touch of realism is the inclusion of a mysterious ocean liner that is part of the Black Star Line, a shipping line incorporated by Marcus Garvey, who organized the United Negro Improvement Association. Portions of the action take place at the "Villa Lewaro" mansion built by Madame C. J. Walker overlooking the Hudson River and at the Harlem town house of her daughter A'Lelia Walker, known as "The Dark Tower", located at 136th Street near Lenox Avenue. Other famous people who appear in the novel include the dance instructor Irene Castle, and the Harlem Renaissance authors James Weldon Johnson, Claude McKay, Wallace Thurman, Countee Cullen, W. E. B. Du Bois, and a veiled reference to Malcolm X.

Additionally, in his project of blending the "real" and the "invented," Reed, through Papa LaBas, recites a counter history of The Bible, whose content transforms the normative understanding of Judeo-Christian roots. Featuring Osiris, Set, Moses and other important figures in both Egyptian and Judeo-Christian mythology, Reed re-imagines an entirely alternate past, evidenced by the Templar conflict that takes place in the novel.

== Magical elements ==
Given that the protagonists of the novel are Voodoo practitioners, the novel itself contains a great deal of Voodoo terminology. In the novel, Voodoo is an effective art: PaPa LaBas practices from his Mumbo Jumbo Kathedral, and at one point his assistant is taken over by a loa whom she has neglected to feed. Voodoo itself is traced back to sharing a common ancestor with Judeo-Christianity in ancient Egypt, with Osiris as the first recipient of Jes Grew, whose effects and powers are interchangeable with that of Voodoo. Moses steals the Petro aspect of the Voodoo secrets from Isis. Other classic mythological figures include Dionysus, who is portrayed as a follower of Osiris, and Faust, who receives his magic not through a deal with the devil but through connections with black Voodoo practitioners.

== Background ==
Mumbo Jumbo draws freely on conspiracy theory, hoodoo, and voodoo traditions, as well as the Afrocentric theories of Marcus Garvey and the occult author Henri Gamache, especially Gamache's theory that the Biblical prophet Moses was black. The book's title is explained by a quote from the first edition of the American Heritage Dictionary deriving the phrase from Mandingo mā-mā-gyo-mbō meaning a "magician who makes the troubled spirits of ancestors go away."

== Format ==
The format and typography of Mumbo Jumbo are unique and make allusion to several typographic and stylistic conventions not normally associated with novels. The text begins and ends as if it were a movie script, with credits, a fade-in, and a freeze-frame followed by the publication and title pages which occur after chapter one. This is followed by a closing section that mimics a scholarly book on social history or folk magic by citing a lengthy bibliography. In addition, the tale is illustrated with drawings, photographs, and collages, some of which relate to the text, some of which look like illustrations from a social-studies book on African-American history, and some of which seem to be included as a cryptic protest against the Vietnam War.

Reed uses various conspicuous devices that remind readers of his presence as the author, such as brief parenthetical commentaries signed "I.R." and footnotes to books published after the action of the story, such as Castles in the Air, a 1958 memoir by Irene Castle. Reed is also credited for the photograph on the first and some later editions of the novel, in which symmetrical images of a nude dark-skinned woman with greased down hair are transposed over a blown-up rose.

Mumbo Jumbo both depends on and fosters the disorientation of the reader. Eschewing the conventional format of a novel, Reed supplies the reader with hand-written letters, radio dispatches, photographs, various typefaces, drawings, and footnotes. The first and second chapters are interrupted by copyright and title pages, invoking a cinematic title screen.

== Literary criticism ==
Scholars such as Alondra Nelson have considered Reed's text as an Afrofuturist text because of the synchronization of voodoo tropes and technology which contributes to its unique form. "Reed's synchronous model defies the progressive linearity of much recent technocultural criticism" (Nelson 8). The non-linear narration, which is cinematic, plays on Afrofuturism's relationship between technology, black magic, and race—to whit: Also, Nelson deals with Reed's use of technology and its functionality in the text. The "…technologies from the setting's future and the author's present inhabit a story situated in the past", in Mumbo Jumbo allow for the emergence of African diasporic technologies in the text. This "anachronistic" nature of Mumbo Jumbo troubles widely accepted conceptualizations of technology, especially in thinking about "when" cultural innovations were created and by "whom".

James A. Snead sees the novel's structure as engaged of the African-American musical and rhetorical trope of "the cut", an interruption that disrupts the linear temporality of the work, looping back to an earlier textual moment. Neil Schmitz's investigates Reed's experimentation with Neo Hoodoo where the writer does not use it as a literary form but as a "characteristic stance, a mythological provenace, a behavior, a complex, of attitudes, the retrieval of an idiom..." (Schmitz, 127). Analyzing Mumbo Jumbo as a "signifying pastiche of Afro-American narrative tradition", Henry Louis Gates posits that Reed's novel opens up a narrative space in which the intricate relationship between black and Western literary forms and conventions are critiqued. Pushing Gates' notion of "signifying pastiche" into the realm of the Afrofuturism, Alondra Nelson holds that Mumbo Jumbo imagines a version of African Diaspora that refuses to detach from tradition as it navigates modernity. For instance, PaPa LaBas make sense of the nuances of black modernity through his use of Haitian "Hoodoo" practices. As such, Reed mobilizes a "future-primitive perspective", which animates the past through the future.

== Themes ==
=== Reclaiming history ===
Throughout the novel, Reed seeks to deconstruct the fundamental foundations upon which white, Western civilization rests. This is exemplified by the Mu'tafika, an organization whose sole purpose is to steal historical artifacts from Western museums and return them to their place of origin. Additionally, the primary manifestation of this occurs in Papa LaBas' 30-page story of The Work (the original practice and philosophy, emanating from the text, that underpins Jes Grew) and its Egyptian roots. Reed uses this history to explicitly undermine the legitimacy of the monotheistic religions on which Western civilization rest. More important, though, is the fact that it does not matter whether or not the reader believes the tale to be true; what matters instead, for Reed, is the fact that an entire population was denied the right to hear his history and the right to choose to believe it. With the framework of Jes Grew already established as a real phenomenon in the novel, Reed's 30-page history imagines a powerful origin and meaning that has, in the course of the African-American slavery experience, been strategically precluded.

=== Jes Grew ===
In Mumbo Jumbo, Reed speaks of the creation of an intrinsically "black text", which is manifested in "Jes Grew". "Jes Grew", Reed's "virus", alludes to the dissemination of uniquely African-American culture in the 1920s that "traversed the land in search of its Text: the lost liturgy seeking its litany". The "Jes Grew" virus influences people to listen to music, dance, and be happy. In many ways Jes Grew is like the funk. The infectious virus ultimately gets suppressed at the end of the plot of the novel. However, at the end of the novel, when Papa Labas is speaking to a college classroom in the 1970s, he talks about how the '70s are like the '20s again. He believes this is the time for Jes Grew to rise. In this instance Papa Labas taps into a similarity between the styles of music that Jes Grew needs to grow; '20s jazz and '70s funk share an aesthetic that calls people to dance. Jes Grew needs the physical expression of music to grow.

The phrase "Jes' Grew" alludes to the character of Topsy in Harriet Beecher Stowe's 1852 novel Uncle Tom's Cabin, who did not know when or how she was born but expected she "jes' growed" ("jes' grew," in the drama adapted from the book, and often elsewhere).

== Editions ==
Mumbo Jumbo was first published in hardback in 1972 by Doubleday in New York, with its cover featuring a photograph of Josephine Baker chosen by the author, who later recalled meeting Baker in the last year of her life and giving her a copy of the book. The novel has remained continuously in print in the decades since its first edition. The first British edition was published in London by Allison and Busby, and the novel has also been published in translation in several languages, including French, Italian, Spanish, Japanese and Chinese. To commemorate its 50 years in print, in 2022, Scribner's released a new edition of Mumbo Jumbo, cited by Harold Bloom as one of 500 great books of the Western canon. It includes a new introduction by Reed.

== Influence and legacy ==
The ZBS Foundation dramatized the novel for a 1980 radio drama of the same name directed by Thomas Lopez.

Parliament-Funkadelic leader George Clinton has cited Mumbo Jumbo as a primary source of inspiration for his P-Funk mythology.

In Thomas Pynchon's 1973 novel Gravity's Rainbow, a remark by the narrator places Reed in the heart of postmodern intertextuality, saying: "Well, and keep in mind where those Masonic Mysteries came from in the first place. (Check out Ishmael Reed. He knows more about it than you will ever find here.)"

In 2017, Mumbo Jumbo was reissued as a Penguin Modern Classic.

Reappraising the book in September 2025, Ben Wormald described Reed's vision as "prophetic" and observed that "in this time of curses and conspiracy, I think it should be on everyone’s reading list. ...Mumbo Jumbo is a sprawling, hilarious, often infuriating novel that gets closer than any work of literature I know to the chaos of contemporary discourse."
