= Henri Gamache =

American writer

Henri Gamache was the pseudonym of Anne Fleitman (January 4, 1906 – October 25, 1990), an American writer who was active in the United States during the 1940s, and who wrote on the subject of magic. All of the Gamache books were published in New York City and most of them consist of semi-scholarly popular compilations that draw from (and give credit to) previously published works on occultism, folklore, and herbalism. The Gamache books are noted for their connection to the Afrocentric theories of Marcus Garvey.

Henri Gamache's most popular books are The Master Book of Candle-Burning, a classic of practical African American hoodoo folk magic, Terrors of the Evil Eye Exposed, a work dealing with worldwide belief in the evil eye, and Mystery of the Long Lost 8th, 9th, and 10th Books of Moses, which is based upon the Garveyist assertion that Moses, the leader of the Jews, was a Black African.

The Mystery of the Long Lost 8th, 9th, and 10th Books of Moses includes material influenced by Garvey and by Moses, Man of the Mountain, a 1939 novel by African-American novelist and anthropologist Zora Neale Hurston, which rewrites the story of the Book of Exodus of Moses and the Israelites from an Afro-American perspective. Entwined with the Garvey-Hurston version of the story of Moses are ancient practical magic spells. Gamache's sources for these are the 13th section of the Greek Magical Papyri, consisting of spells attributed to Moses, and The Sword of Moses, an apocryphal Hebrew language book of angelic magic attributed to Moses, but actually dating to the first millennium CE and translated into German by Moses Gaster in 1896. Gamache's title places the 8th, 9th, and 10th Books of Moses as the purported sequel to the 19th century (and earlier) Jewish grimoire known as the Sixth and Seventh Books of Moses.

== Disputed identity ==
The identity of Henri Gamache was disputed for many years. Some researchers took at face value the mid-1950s copyright renewal claims of a book publisher named Joseph W. Kay (a.k.a. Joseph Spitalnick), in which Kay claimed to be the actual author of all works by both Henri Gamache and a pseudonymous occult author of the 1930s, Lewis de Claremont (also spelled Louis de Clermont). The falsity of Kay's claims with regard to the works of de Claremont is demonstrable, because the de Claremont books were first published by another company and only assigned to Kay upon republication, and this obvious attempt at deception in turn cast doubt upon Kay's claim to the Gamache authorship, which were also independently published before Kay released his editions.

Joe Kay died in 1967, but interviews with younger members of the Kay family brought out the fact that the elder Kay obtained copyright ownership and publication rights to the previously published writings of a Mr. Young, whose first name is lost, in exchange for a debt owed. Young is mentioned as a writer of occult books within the pages of the ghost-written autobiography of the famous African American stage magician Benjamin Rucker, better known as Black Herman. Thus it became obvious that both Henri Gamache and Lewis de Claremont / Louis de Clermont were not pseudonyms for Joe Kay (Joseph Spitalnik), and that Kay was only a printer and publisher, but not the author of these books.

== Actual identity ==
In 2013, Catherine Yronwode published an account of an interview with Ed Kay, the son of Joseph Kay, in which Ed Kay stated that he recalled Henri Gamache as the pseudonym of a "young college educated Jewish woman who worked for my father and wrote books for him".

In 2021 Yronwode published the results of her research of the U.S. copyright records and information gathered from Anne Fleitman's living relatives, to confirm Fleitman's identity as the actual author of all of Gamache's works. In a brief bibliographical account of Fleitman's life titled Anne Fleitman: The Woman Who Was Henri Gamache, she wrote: "It took me sixty years to discover the truth, because the copyright renewers who reprinted the books falsely claimed that they were Henri Gamache, but in reality, this well-loved author was a Jewish woman named Anne Fleitman, born on January 4th, 1906. During her life she owned four different publishing houses, and one of them, Sheldon Publications, was named for her son, Sheldon Fleitman (1932-2011); her other son was Jules Fleitman (1926-1994). Under the pseudonym Sally Edwoods she kept an office at 6 West 28th Street in New York City, plus a ten acre parcel in rural New York which she leased to traveling carnival operators. She died on October 24th, 1990, at the age of 84, and was buried in Mount Hebron Cemetery, Flushing, New York. By all accounts, she was a wild, fun-loving, politically liberal woman who strongly supported the Civil Rights Movement."

== Books by Anne Fleitman as Henri Gamache ==
- Doorway to Your Success. Open Door Publishing Company,1940
- The Master Book of Candle-Burning. 1942
- The Magic of Herbs. Power Thoughts Publishing Co., 1942
- The Master Key to Occult Secrets. Doorway Publications, 1945
- Terrors of the Evil Eye Exposed. Raymond Publishing, 1946. Republished as Protection Against Evil. Raymond Publishing, 1969. Revised, annotated, and expanded edition published as Terrors of the Evil Eye Exposed: Protection Against Evil by Henri Gamache, Catherine Yronwode, and Dr. Jeremy Weiss. Lucky Mojo, 2021. ISBN 978-0-9997809-8-5
- Mystery of the Long Lost 8th, 9th, and 10th Books of Moses. Sheldon Publications, 1948
