= Flight to Canada =

1976 novel by Ishmael Reed

- Author: Ishmael Reed
- Language: English
- Publisher: Random House
- Publication date: 1976
- Publication place: United States
- Media type: Print
- ISBN: 0-684-84750-7
- Preceded by: The Last Days of Louisiana Red
- Followed by: The Terrible Twos

Flight to Canada is a 1976 novel by African-American author Ishmael Reed. Set in the last years of the American Civil War and its aftermath, the story makes ready use of anachronism, referencing both actual and fabricated pop-cultural phenomena from the twentieth century, such as the made-up "Beecher Hour" TV show, as well as technology such as cassette tapes, jumbo jets, and Coffee-Mate. Published in the year of the United States Bicentennial, the book was called "a demonized Uncle Tom's Cabin" by The New York Times. Reed himself has described the novel, as a "neo–slave narrative", and its influence has been identified in the work of Colson Whitehead.
