= The Last Days of Louisiana Red =

1974 novel by Ishmael Reed

- First edition
- Author: Ishmael Reed
- Language: English
- Publisher: Random House
- Publication date: 1974
- Publication place: USA
- Media type: Print
- Pages: 177
- ISBN: 0394491882
- Preceded by: Mumbo Jumbo
- Followed by: Flight to Canada

The Last Days of Louisiana Red (1974) is a novel written by Ishmael Reed. It is considered a model novel of the Black Arts Movement and contains many elements of postmodernism. It continues the story of the character Papa LaBas introduced in Reed's previous novel, 1972's Mumbo Jumbo, and emphasises voodoo. According to Kirkus Reviews, "Reed's hoodoo/mojo/gris gris/Mumbo Jumbo has a wickedly funny vitality that undermines white European ideology."

== Plot summary ==
The Last Days of Louisiana Red, which has been described as a "HooDoo detective story and a comprehensive satire on the explosive politics of the '60s" ...[that] exposes the hypocrisy of contemporary American culture and race politics", is set amidst the racial violence of Berkeley, California.

The plot follows investigator Papa LaBas as he tries to figure out who murdered Ed Yellings, the proprietor of the Solid Gumbo Works. In the story, Labas finds himself fighting the rising tide of violence propagated by Louisiana Red and the militant opportunists, the Moochers. Eventually, Labas learns that the murder has been a conspiracy to dethrone the Gumbo business because Ed was trying to create medicine that would stop heroin addiction.

== Characters ==
- Ed Yellings - the proprietor of the Business known as Solid Gumbo Works. He is murdered early in the novel, and his Business is passed on to his son, Wolf.
- Wolf - one of the two sons of Ed Yellings.
- Sister - one of the daughters of Ed Yellings.
- Minnie - the youngest daughter of Ed Yellings, she leads a society known as the Moochers.
- Papa Labas - a sort of detective character who tries to figure out the mystery behind Ed Yellings' murder.
- Nanny Lisa - a nanny who lives at the home of Ed Yellings and takes care of the children. She forms a very special bond with Minnie.
