= Richard Nagler =

American businessman and photographer (born 1947)

Richard Nagler (born 1947) is an American businessman and photographer. Four books of his photography have been published. His photography has been exhibited in numerous museum and gallery exhibitions throughout the United States and Europe; and his photography is included in many public and private collections. The work has also been featured in publications including: The New York Times, The Wall Street Journal, Artforum International, Artweek, The Los Angeles Times, Playboy Magazine and the San Francisco Chronicle. Nagler graduated from the University of Pennsylvania in 1969 magna cum laude/Phi Beta Kappa with a B. A. in politics and philosophy, and began his career in photography in the 1970s. NAGLER's latest book LOOKING AT ART:THE ART OF LOOKING (Heyday Books, 2014) was a finalist for the USA Book Awards/Best Photography Book of 2014, won a gold medal for Photography at the Non-Fiction Book Awards in 2014, won First Prize in Photography at the Beverly Hills Book Awards 2014, won the National Independent Book Award for Excellence in Photography, and was a Finalist in the IndieFab Book Awards for 2014. Richard Nagler is also a book reviewer specializing in photography and other fine arts for The New York Journal of Books.

== Book reviews ==
=== My Love Affair with Miami Beach ===
The book features photographs that focus on a small Jewish neighborhood; South Beach in Miami Beach, Florida.

Nobel laureate Isaac Bashevis Singer who wrote the introduction and provides commentary throughout the book said: "People in this country have a prejudice about Miami Beach; it means to them vulgar Jews...I say, 'vulgar – shmulgar'...they're only people...when people are on vacation or they retire, they can act a little, as they say, 'out of this world'...I see many funny and silly things here often because many people desire to appear young and not old." The Washington Post gave it a positive review, saying: "It's a marvelous portrait of a neighborhood, with Singer's impassioned commentary – by no means limited to the topic at hand – a fine bonus".

The New York Times called the book "evocative" and said Nagler's photographs reflect a "sense of irony and humor" that's similar to Singer's commentary in the book. They also wrote, "this buoyant blend of words and images captures both the idiosyncratic spirit and the deep sadness of these South Beach survivors."

=== Oakland Rhapsody: The Secret Soul of an American Downtown ===
The San Francisco Chronicle''wrote (June 4, 1995) Novelist Ishmael Reed calls Oakland the city that refuses to die, and these richly evocative photographs demonstrate why. "The Oakland Tribune" noted (May 25, 1995) that: On the cover, the vibrant glow of dusk wraps Oakland's downtown in majesty, innocence, and romance. But the image that emerges from the pages of the handsome coffee table art book is not idyllic, but real.

=== Word on the Street ===
The success of the photographs depends on what Henri Cartier-Bresson called the ‘decisive moment’.

The word is an equal character in the photograph.

— Peter Selz
Malcolm Margolin,

This monograph features photographs taken in various cities in California, and also in New York, Las Vegas, Tel Aviv, London and Paris. Every picture shows the juxtapositions of a single word (Note: For example: a single word...on a billboard, sign or scratched into a wall...a sign, a T-shirt, gravestone or theater marquee...a street sign, a bit of graffiti, posters, bumper stickers.)and a single person who happens to pass by and is photographed by Nagler.

Allen Ginsberg said of the book, "the photographs of Nagler brought to mind the concentrated, evocative form of haiku", calling the images "picture poems." UK based Digital Photographer was impressed with the work calling the pictures, "compelling, shocking, amusing, and sensitive, each portrait is a visual pun-a wink to the reader and an invitation to create a story to complete the narrative...the magic of his work rests in the serendipitous moment when person and word come together....and reveals that we are all part of an amazing artistic mosaic, even as we blithely stroll down the street".

Sacramento News & Review gave it a positive review stating, "Nagler's rare photos show signs of Henri Cartier-Bresson’s artist sensitivity and Dorothea Lange’s grit and realism...but he is not above making jokes; watch for his wit and ironic wisdom in this insightful collection. Lawrence Ferlinghetti wrote, "Richard Nagler finds ‘Words’ in the streets like objets trouvés, giving each an inscrutable meaning." Ishmael Reed opined that "Nagler is watching the world carefully and seeing what we say about the world and the world says about us, one word at a time."

=== Looking at Art, the Art of Looking ===
Nagler got the idea for this book in 2007 when he was at the Museum of Modern Art in New York. The book features photographs of works of art in museums and the patrons who are standing in front on them viewing the artwork.

SF Gate commented on the "startling mirroring elements" of the photographs: "A woman with a patchwork jacket and skullcap blends into Gottfried Helnwein's Epiphany II (Adoration of the Shepherds), and a woman with a geometric-patterned scarf looks like an extension of Ellsworth Kelly's [1951 oil on wood painting], Cité. Shutterbug Magazine said the images between the viewers and the artwork were "magical moments" and that the "viewer's reaction to the piece is what gives the art its heart and soul, bringing it to life...Nagler masters that task expertly as he links the viewer and the piece together as equals, parts of a greater entity". The San Francisco Examiner noted one minor disappointment in the book: the year the photograph was taken is missing.

== Exhibitions ==
SOLO EXHIBITIONS
Year	Exhibition	Location
1983	Focus on Old Oakland 1973–1983	Oakland Museum, Oakland, CA
1983	The Urban Landscape	Image Gallery, Walnut Creek, CA
1984	Lost Miami Beach	Catskill Center for Photography, Woodstock, NY
1984	Selected Images	Oakland Museum Collector's Gallery, Oakland, CA
1992	My Love Affair With Miami Beach	Judah L. Magnes Museum, Berkeley, CA
1993	My Love Affair With Miami Beach (Traveling exhibition)	→ Gilbert Pavilion, Riverdale, NY; → Dubin-Wolf Exhibit Center, Los Angeles, CA; → Museum of the Jewish Diaspora, Tel Aviv, Israel; → Albert Einstein Center, Sacramento, CA
1994	My Love Affair With Miami Beach (Traveling exhibition)	→ May Museum, Lawrence, NY; → Koret Gallery, Palo Alto, CA
1995	My Love Affair With Miami Beach	University of California, Santa Cruz, Santa Cruz, CA
2004	Such is Life, 30 Years of Photography	George Krevsky Gallery, San Francisco, CA
2007	The Unspoken Word	George Krevsky Gallery, San Francisco, CA

SELECTED GROUP EXHIBITIONS
Year	Exhibition	Location
1984	Picture Oakland (First Prize Color Photography)	Pro Arts Gallery, Oakland, CA
1985	Snap '85	San Francisco Arts Commission Gallery San Francisco, CA
1986	Selections	Eye Gallery, San Francisco, CA
1986	Oakland, California, U. S. A.	Dalian, China
1987	Only in Miami Beach	Blake Street Gallery, Berkeley, CA
1988	A Kiss is Just A Kiss	Twining Gallery, New York City
1989	Best of the Decade (Traveling exhibition)	→ Festival at The Lake, Oakland, CA (Best of Show); → Faulkner Color Lab, San Francisco, CA
1989	A Kiss is Just a Kiss	Klein Gallery, Chicago, IL
1991	Through the Lens Lightly, Photographers Look at Oakland	Gallery Arcade, Oakland, CA
1993	My Love Affair With Miami Beach (Traveling exhibition)	→ Jewish Community Center Washington, D.C.; → Jewish Festival of the Arts, Vancouver, B. C.
1995	It Belongs in a Museum: Acquisitions 1992–1995	Magnes Collection of Jewish Art and Life, Berkeley, CA
1996	Culture and Continuity: The Jewish Journey	Jewish Museum, New York City
1998	Lawrence Ferlinghetti: Pure Art vs. Agit-Prop	George Krevsky Gallery, San Francisco
2000	Diamonds and Dust: the Art of Baseball	George Krevsky Gallery, San Francisco
2004	Portraits of Jews 1975–1995	The Museum of the Jewish People at Beit Hatfutsot, Tel Aviv, Israel
2005	Art of the Game:The Art of Baseball	George Krevsky Gallery, San Francisco
2005	Contemporary Perspectives	Museum of Contemporary Art, Santa Rosa, CA
2007	Spring Training: The Art of Baseball	George Krevsky Gallery, San Francisco
2007	Faces and Places	George Krevsky Gallery, San Francisco
2017	South Beach, 1974–1990: Photographs of a Jewish Community	HistoryMiami Miami, FL
2022	Picturing Resistance Art Intersection Gallery, Gilbert, Arizona, September 10 - October 22, 2022, juried group exhibition	

== Bibliography ==
- Nagler, Richard (1991). My Love Affair with Miami Beach. Simon & Schuster. ISBN 978-0-6717-4184-6. "Isaac Bashevis Singer (Introduction and commentary)"
- Nagler, Richard (1995). Oakland Rhapsody: The Secret Soul of an American Downtown. North Atlantic Books. ISBN 978-1-5564-3197-5. "Ishmael Reed (Introduction and commentary)"
- Nagler, Richard (2010). Word on the Street. Heyday. ISBN 978-1-5971-4140-6. "Foreword by Peter Selz"
- Nagler, Richard (2014). Looking at Art, the Art of Looking. Heyday. ISBN 978-1-5971-4266-3.

== See also ==
- 100 Photographs that Changed the World
- Marion Post Wolcott

== Sources ==
- O'Neill, Claire (January 26, 2011). "Word on the Street: Photos Of People With Words". NPR.
- Josselin-Rufus, Anneli Star (November 24, 2010). "Searching for Words with Richard Nagler". East Bay Express.
- Van Buskirk, Jim (September 4, 2014). "'Looking at Art' a photo book with wit, power". The San Francisco Examiner.
