= Yellow Back Radio Broke-Down =

1969 novel by Ishmael Reed

- First edition
- Author: Ishmael Reed
- Language: English
- Genre: Satirical Western novel
- Published: 1969 (Doubleday)
- Publication place: United States
- Media type: Print (Hardback & Paperback)
- Pages: 177 pp
- ISBN: 0-385-06754-2
- OCLC: 43333542
- Dewey Decimal: 813/.54 21
- LC Class: PS3568.E365 Y4 2000
- Preceded by: The Freelance Pallbearers
- Followed by: Mumbo Jumbo

Yellow Back Radio Broke-Down is a novel by the African-American writer Ishmael Reed. It is a satirical take on the traditional Western. It is Ishmael Reed's second novel, following The Freelance Pallbearers (1967), and was first published in 1969. It tells the story of the Loop Garoo Kid, an African-American cowboy who practices the religion of Neohoodooism, and describes his struggle against established religion and cultural oppression.

== Plot introduction ==
Yellow Back Radio Broke-Down is a western that spans some three centuries of history and references locations from across the United States landscape. Through the three colorful protagonists, Chief Showcase, a Native American, Drag Gibson, a white land capitalist, and the Loop Garoo Kid, an African-American cowboy, Reed criticizes the hypocrisy of the American Church, the warping of history to degrade the portrayal of African Americans, and ways the "white man" attempts to destroy the "black man".

== Explanation of the title ==
The novel's title summarizes both its literary and cultural messages. "Yellow Back" references the traditionally yellow covers of lurid dime Westerns, while "Radio" references Reed's strategy of writing the book in an oral, broadcast tradition. In a 1974 interview, Reed states that he "based the book on old radio scripts in which the listener constructed the sets with his imagination; that's why 'radio'; also because it's an oral book, a talking book...there's more dialogue than scenery or description." The "broke-down" indicates a deconstruction of the traditional American Western novel. "Yellow Back Radio" can also be seen as symbolic of a media broadcasting traditional American values of capitalism and monotheism. The Loop Garoo Kid, bearing a strange religion from that "strange continent which serves as the subconscious of our planet" (152), uses Neohoodooism to "Break Down" this cultural broadcast.

== Plot summary ==
Yellow Back Radio Broke-Down jumps into the narrative of the main protagonist, Loop Garoo, a black, silver tongued, circus cowboy, who represents the devil to the white men. The circus troupe heads into Yellow Back Radio, a sparsely populated ghost town overtaken by a child population in Indian garb. The circus troupe and the children are massacred by the adults who were chased out by the children, while Loop Garoo escapes with his life and a desire for vengeance. Drag Gibson, a homosexual and influential land-owner who is head of the city, is also introduced.

As Drag deals with the problems from a deteriorating city, Loop Garoo is saved from being eaten by wild animals by Chief Showcase, a Native American who fights his oppressors through suave and underhanded means. Loop begins his Hoodoo curses on Drag, giving him the retroactive itch and other inconveniences, as the conflict builds.

Drag murders his sixth wife and orders his seventh through the mail-order service. Her name is Mustache Sal, a nymphomaniac who seeks to murder Drag to inherit his vast fortunes. She proceeds to have sex with just about every main and minor male character, showing a complete lack of discrimination. As Drag continues into a progressively more deteriorating state of mind because of the uncontrollable loss of power and influence around him, Loop Garoo continues to gain influence through his appearance in town, soundly whipping the marshal and pushing the Preacher into the brink of insanity.

Mustache Sal's attempt to poison her husband fails and she is fed to the iron-jawed pigs. Drag then brings in John Wesley Hardin, a sharp-shooting racist who kills black people out of pleasure. When Loop Garoo quickly kills him, Drag's health quickly deteriorates until his savior, the Pope, arrives riding on a red bull. He describes to the city's citizens the Hoodoo that Loop Garoo is putting on them and proceeds to capture Loop with no difficulty. However, when the Pope fails in persuading Loop to return to Rome with him, he leaves in defeat. Drag sets up the execution of Loop but fails to execute him; instead through the sudden appearance of children with new technology, Amazonian women, and Field Marshal Theda Doompussy Blackwell's raygun-wielding detectives, Drag falls into the pit of pigs and dies.

== Characters ==
=== Major characters ===
The Loop Garoo Kid is an African-American cowboy and Neohoodoo houngan. He combats the imperialism and monopolistic greed of Drag Gibson and organized religion, casting spells and summoning Loa to assist him. His struggle against Gibson symbolizes his fight against the power structure and repressive elements of white culture. He embodies African-American culture and religion; his art is as diverse and adaptable as the Hoodoo rituals he performs. Loop Garoo is the apocryphal brother of Jesus Christ, the love interest of the Virgin Mary, and the high priest of Neohoodooism.

Drag Gibson is an influential landowner who represents the impact of white culture on the West, the rapacious greed of land capitalists, and the rigidity of Judeo-Christian values. He rules the town of Yellow Back Radio from his ranch house with a small army of ranch hands. A blatant racist with no regard for human life, he kills off a total of seven wives by the end of the novel. Drag clashes with Loop Garoo and Neohoodooism until he is finally eaten by Yellow Back Radio's steel-jawed hogs.

Chief Showcase is the last surviving Native-American in the Yellow Back Radio region. After Drag Gibson slaughtered his tribe, he began writing militant poetry about white imperialism. Reed portrays Showcase as spiritual and advanced - he travels in a helicopter that confuses and terrifies his provincial white adversaries. Showcase fights back against his oppressors by playing both sides of an escalating conflict between Drag Gibson and the powers in Washington, D.C., working to stir up trouble between the powerful Western landowner and the greedy Federal Government.

=== Minor characters ===
Zozo Labrique is a Hoodoo mambo who travelled with Loop Garoo's circus. She taught Loop Garoo connaissance, or Hoodoo magic, and was killed by Drag Gibson's cowhands when they burned down the circus. She reappears in the novel as a Loa called upon by Loop Garoo during his summoning ritual.

Mustache Sal is Drag Gibson's nymphomaniac mail-order bride. She marries Drag with the intention of poisoning him and inheriting his land, but he discovers her plan and feeds her to the executioner's steel-jawed hogs. In contrast to the Black Cougar Saloon's Hurdy Gurdy girls and Drag's previous wife, The Horrible Hybrid, Mustache Sal displays independence, intelligence, and open-mindedness. She doesn't discriminate racially in her personal associations, consorting with Loop Garoo, the ranch hands, and Chief Showcase alike.

Reverend Boyd is the Protestant minister of Yellow Back Radio. He tries to connect with the youth of the town, hosting light shows for them, but his efforts fail. He turns to alcohol for comfort and is ridiculed by Loop Garoo and Pope Innocent. He is killed by the Pope with a can of DDT-based insecticide.

Field Marshal Theda Doompussy Blackwell is a member of the U.S. military brass who schemes with Chief Showcase to take control of Drag Gibson's land. Reed portrays the Field Marshal as weak, petulant, and possibly homosexual, poking fun at the typically virile stereotype of the military man.

== Major themes ==
=== Neohoodooism ===
Reed interweaves the basic tenets of a religious aesthetic called Neohoodooism throughout the text. He achieves this chiefly through the statements of the Loop Garoo Kid, the spiritual high priest of Neohoodooism. The religious side of Neohoodooism has its roots in the African-American folk magic of Hoodoo, which Reed claims is based on the West African religion of Vodoun. Loop Garoo's summoning of various Loa and hexing of Drag Gibson confirms these religious roots.

Neohoodooism is also an artistic aesthetic which values multicultural hybridism. The Loop Garoo Kid uses Neohoodooism to fight Drag Gibson, a symbol of the intolerance in white culture. Their battle represents the struggle of an inclusive African-American culture against a rigid Judeo-Christian one.

Reed explains that he linked the religious and aesthetic aspects of Neohoodooism together because the one is a metaphor for the other; both aspects are essentially amalgamations: "Voodoo is the perfect metaphor for the multicultural. Voodoo comes out of the fact that all these different tribes and cultures were brought from Africa and Haiti. All of their mythologies, knowledges, and herbal medicines, their folklores, jelled. It's an amalgamation like this country."

=== Religious conflict ===
Yellow Back Radio Broke-Down is rife with religious conflict. Protestantism conflicts with Catholicism, and Catholicism with Neohoodooism. Yellow Back Radio's reverend, Preacher Boyd, symbolizes the failure of Protestantism. Despite his best efforts, the young people of the town ignore him, and as a result he descends into despair and alcoholism. The representatives of both the novel's other major religions scorn him. The Loop Garoo Kid, high priest of Neohoodooism, lashes the crucifix off Reverend Boyd's neck with a bullwhip, and Pope Innocent, leader of the Catholic Church, kills him with a can of insecticide. Protestantism in the town Yellow Back Radio is out of touch and dying. Catholicism and Neohoodooism conflict during an argument between Loop Garoo and Pope Innocent. Loop Garoo launches a scathing attack on the violent nature of the Catholic Church: "You and your crowd are the devils. The way you massacred the Gnostics, not to mention the Bogomils, Albigenses, and Waldenses" (165). Reed compares African-American Neohoodooism to Catholicism, contrasting the tolerance and inclusiveness of the former with the massacres and bigotry of the latter.

=== Racial conflict ===
The struggle between a pluralistic African-American culture and an intolerant white culture is central to the novel. Loop Garoo, the impromptu spell-casting Hoodoo houngan, diametrically opposes the bigoted Drag Gibson. The conflict between these two men and the forces they represent leads to direct, racist violence. Drag Gibson sets fire to Loop Garoo's circus, killing his associates and forcing him to flee into the desert. He then hires the genocidal John Wesley Hardin to finish off Loop Garoo. Hardin symbolizes the racist tendencies of the Old West; he sees African Americans as the devil incarnate and slaughters them without mercy. The Loop Garoo Kid responds to Drag's violence by calling on a diverse array of resources, unleashing the power of nature and the innumerable hexes and spells of the Hoodoo religion on Gibson and his cronies. Drag is quickly overwhelmed by the forces assembled against him, and not even Pope Innocent can save him from Loop Garoo. Reed argues that the transparent violence employed by white society is no match for the diversity and adaptability of African-American religion and culture. Reed also comments on the ethnocidal history of the Western Expansion. Chief Showcase's poetry bitterly reflects the atrocities committed against Native Americans by white imperialists, and Showcase sardonically jeers at the promises of white leaders.

== Literary significance and reception ==
Yellow Back Radio Broke-Down was received with varied criticisms. A review in the Harvard Crimson by Lynn Darling stated: "Ishmael Reed has taken assorted scraps and shavings from American history, religion, and polities and made of them a tale that at first sounds like a child's nightmare of shadows and misconceptions. But by the time you finish, it's no longer so childish." "Neil Schmitz, in an essay on Reed's fiction in Twentieth Century Literature (April 1974), judged Yellow Back Radio "to exhibit a 'simplistic' focus and 'diffused' energy, although many readers found it to be a comic tour de force."

- "Ishmael Reed is a most talented humorist and possessor of a powerfully antic and lyric imagination...Yellow Back Radio Broke-Down should be read as hard evidence of Reed's uncommon talent." The New Yorker
- "Ishmael Reed has mastered the vocabulary of blasphemy. He skins all our sacred cows." Life
- "Yellow Back Radio Broke-Down is a full blown 'horse opera,' a surrealistic spoof of the Western with Indian chiefs aboard helicopters, stagecoaches and closed circuit TVs, cavalry charges of taxis." The New York Review of Books

Yellow Back Radio Broke-Down has been cited as an important precursor or model for the 1974 satirical Western film Blazing Saddles, a connection that Reed himself has made.

== Allusions and references ==
=== Allusions to other works ===
- Drag Gibson constantly reads a book entitled The Life of Catherine the Great
- The name Loop Garoo is similar to the French word for werewolf (Loup Garou); a werewolf is also central to the plot of Ishmael Reed's 1967 novel The Freelance Pallbearers.
- The Bible is mentioned throughout the novel.

=== Allusions to actual history, geography and current science ===
- Thomas Jefferson's relationship with his female black slaves is satirized mercilessly in the novel.
- Meriwether Lewis and William Clark appear briefly in the novel and are described as vice-presidents in Drag Gibson's Atrocity Corporation.
- Drag Gibson hires John Wesley Hardin to kill the Loop Garoo Kid.
- The treacherous fur-trapper Royal Flush Gooseman is from St. Louis, Missouri.
- New Orleans is referenced as a center of Hoodooism in the United States and the former home of Zozo Labrique.
- Loop tells the Preacher Rev. Boyd to "check his sources" with Guillaume Apollinaire (p. 103).
- Pope Innocent makes an appearance as a worldly man who seeks compromise. He is most similar to Pope Innocent IV, a Pope known for his liberal stance on sex, sanctioning a man's right to "[divide] his flesh among many."
- The novel mentions locations all over the world, from New York City, London, and Calcutta, to Idaho and Montana

== Awards and nominations ==
Yellow Back Radio Broke-Down was rated one of the 100 Best Books in the 20th Century by the American Book Review and a San Francisco Chronicle readers' poll.

== Publication history ==
- 1969, United States, Doubleday. First edition, hardcover
- 1971, London, UK, Allison & Busby, hardback and paperback
- 1972, United States, Bantam Books, paperback
- 2000, United States, First Dalkey Archive Edition, ISBN 1-56478-238-7, paperback
