= The Domestic Crusaders =

Play about a Pakistani-American Muslim family

- Original language: English
- Written by: Wajahat Ali
- Subject: Trials and tribulations of Pakistani-American Muslim family post-9/11
- Genre: Drama
- Setting: Post-9/11; family house in the United States

Premiere
- Date: 2005
- Place: Berkeley Repertory Theatre; Berkeley, California

The Domestic Crusaders is a play by Wajahat Ali about a Pakistani-American Muslim family.

The play made its Off-Broadway premiere at the Nuyorican Poets Café on September 11, 2009. The story is about the lives of a Pakistani-American family grappling with their own internal trials and tribulations, the changing dynamics of American society and a globalized, post-9/11 world. McSweeney's published the play in the Fall of 2010.

== Summary ==
The play takes place over the course of one day, in an upper-middle-class suburban family home of a Muslim-American family of Pakistani origins. Six members of a Pakistani-American Muslim family, spanning three generations, reunite at the family home to celebrate the youngest son's 21st birthday. Each individual family member, or "domestic crusader", attempts to assert his or her individual definition of self and destiny in the face of collective family and societal constraints, fears and misunderstandings.

== Characters ==
- Hakim is the grandfather, a retired Pakistani army officer
- Salman is the father who oscillates between prideful exuberance and the daily grind that preys on his feelings of self-worth
- Khulsoom is Salman's wife who misses her native land and struggles to impart her traditional values onto her American-raised children
- Salahuddin is the eldest son who is a successful businessman
- Fatima is the middle child and a social justice activist
- Ghafur is the youngest child, whose 21st birthday serves as the occasion for the family reunion around which the play's events unfold

== History ==
Ali, who is an attorney and writer in the Bay Area, began writing the play in 2001 while studying at the University of California, Berkeley. The idea for the play came from Ali's writing professor, Ishmael Reed, who encouraged him to write a theatrical piece that shed light on the inner lives of American Muslims, an increasingly marginalized American religious community.

Ali explained his choice of the play's ironic title in the February 2011 issue of American Theatre, saying it refers to "hundreds of years of alleged inherent acrimony between the West and Islam....I wanted to reframe that within this multi-hyphenated Muslim-American family. These 'crusaders,' instead of being blood-thirsty warmongers, are nuanced, hypocritical, self-involved, quirky people. Instead of Kalashnikovs and swords and missiles, we see them fighting with stinging barbs and wit and regrets and secrets—good old-fashioned drama and melodrama."

== Premiere ==
The two-act play officially premiered as a 2005 showcase production at the Tony Award-winning Berkeley Repertory Theatre. The play was and continued to be directed by acclaimed choreographer and director Carla Blank through 2011.

The play received its international premiere performances at MuslimFest in Mississauga, Ontario, Canada, on July 31 and August 1, 2010, and was showcased in Washington, D.C.'s Atlas Performing Arts Center on November 12, 2010, and at the Kennedy Center's Millennium Hall on November 14, 2010. The one-hour performance of Act One remains archived on the Kennedy Center website.

== Reception ==
The play's New York debut on September 11, 2009, at the Nuyorican Poets Café drew significant public attention, with a sold-out five-week run that broke attendance records for plays at the landmark Off-Broadway theatre. Village Voice critic highlighted the play's contribution to theatrical representations of the Muslim-American experience in the aftermath of the September 11 attacks.

== See also ==
- List of cultural references to the September 11 attacks
