= Netty Simons =

American composer and pianist (1913–1994)

Netty Simons (née Rothenberg) (26 October 1913-1 April 1994) was an American pianist, music editor, music educator and composer.

== Biography ==
Netty Simons was born in New York City and studied music at Third Street Music School. She graduated from New York University where she studied with Marion Bauer and Percy Grainger from 1931 to 1937, and taught at the Third Street Music School from 1928 to 1933. In 1933 she began studies with Alexander Siloti at the Juilliard School of Music, and in 1938 with composer Stefan Wolpe.

From 1961 to 1962 she was producer and coordinator of concerts at Carnegie Hall in New York City. She received a Recording Publication Award from the Ford Foundation in 1971. Her papers are archived at the New York Public Library and the Vassar College Libraries.

== Selected works ==
- Songs for Wendy for voice and viola (c.1975)
- Quartet
- Quartet for Strings
- Quintet
- Night Sounds for piano
- Windfall
- Illuminations
- Piano Work 1952
- 2 Dot for 2 Pianos
- Trialogue I: The Tombstone Told When She Died for alto, baritone and viola (1963); words by Dylan Thomas
- Trialogue II: Myselves Grieve for alto, baritone and viola (1969); words by Dylan Thomas
- Trialogue III: Now (Now, Say Nay) for mezzo-soprano, baritone and viola (1973); words by Dylan Thomas
- Songs for Jenny
- Three Songs (1950)
- Design Groups I (1967)
- Silver Thaw
- Puddintame
- Buckeye Has Wings
- Too Late, Bridge Is Closed
- Great Stream Sile
- Facets 2, Trio for flute/piccolo, B-flat clarinet, and double bass
- Facets 3 for oboe (or viola) and piano (1962)
- Facets 4 for string quartet
- Cityscape No. 1
- Cityscape No. 2
- This Slowly Drifting Cloud
- Duo
- Circle of Attitudes for violin
- Sonata
- Quartet for Strings
- Summer's Outing for concert band
- Journey Sometimes Delayed for concert band
- Gate of Hundred Sorrows'
- Wild Tales Told On the River Road for clarinet (or bass clarinet) and percussion
- Summer's Outing for concert band

Simons' works have been recorded and issued on vinyl, including:

- Music for Young Listeners Classical/Chamber, CRI Records, 1973
- Donald Erb/J.M. Mestres-Quadreny/Will Ogdon/Netty Simons Played by Bertram Turetzky, Desto Records, 1970
