= Victor Hernández Cruz =

Puerto Rican writer (born 1949)

- Born: February 6, 1949 (age 77); Aguas Buenas, Puerto Rico
- Occupation: Poet
- Writing career
- Period: 1960s – present
- Notable awards: International Griffin Poetry Prize; Guggenheim Foundation and NEA fellowships
- Literary movement: Nuyorican

Victor Hernández Cruz (born February 6, 1949) is a Puerto Rican poet. In 1981, Life named him one of America's greatest poets.

== Biography ==
=== Early years ===
Hernández Cruz was born in Aguas Buenas, Puerto Rico. In 1954, his family moved to New York City and lived in Spanish Harlem. There he received his primary and secondary education. He began to write poetry while attending Benjamin Franklin High School.

=== Poetry career ===
During his high school years, he wrote various poems, including "Snaps". In 1969, Random House published his collection Snaps and the following year his poetry began to appear in various publications including Evergreen Review and The New York Review of Books.

In 1970, Hernández Cruz worked with New York's "Poetry-in-the-school" program. He moved to San Francisco in 1973 and served as a visiting poet in various colleges. From 1973 to 1975, he read and performed his works as a traveling troubadour, covering much of the United States.

Hernández Cruz received fellowships from the National Endowment for the Arts and the John Simon Guggenheim Memorial Foundation.

In 1981, the April issue of Life proclaimed Hernández Cruz a National Treasure when they included his name among the greatest American poets. He is the first Hispanic in the US to have this honor bestowed on him.

== Memberships ==
Hernández Cruz is a distinguished member of the famed Nuyorican school of poets (also referred to as the Nuyorican Movement). He tweaks syntactic conventions of English and Spanish to communicate his own voice.

He was Chancellor of the Academy of American Poets.

== Awards ==
- Griffin Poetry Prize
- Guggenheim Foundation
- National Endowment for the Arts fellowships

== Works ==
- Papo Got His Gun, 1966 (chapbook).
- Snaps, Random House, 1969. 135 pp.
- Mainland: Poems. Random House. 1973. ISBN 978-0-394-46091-8.
- Red Beans. Coffee House Press. 1991. ISBN 978-0-918273-91-8.
- Panoramas. Coffee House Press. 2001. ISBN 978-1-56689-066-3.
- Maraca: New and Selected Poems, 1966–2000. Coffee House Press. 2001. ISBN 978-1-56689-122-6.
- The Mountain in the Sea: Poems. Coffee House Press. 2006. ISBN 978-1-56689-191-2.
- In the Shadow of Al-Andalus. Coffee House Press. 2011. ISBN 978-1-56689-277-3.
- Beneath the Spanish. Coffee House Press. 2017. ISBN 978-1-56689-489-0.

== Reviews ==
Allen Ginsberg wrote about Snaps:

Poesy news from space anxiety police age inner city, spontaneous urban American language as Williams wished, high school street consciousness transparent, original soul looking out intelligent Bronx windows.

== See also ==
- Before Columbus Foundation
- List of Puerto Ricans
- List of Puerto Rican writers
- Puerto Rican literature
- Latino literature
