= Ishmael Reed =

American poet, novelist, essayist, songwriter, and playwright (born 1938)

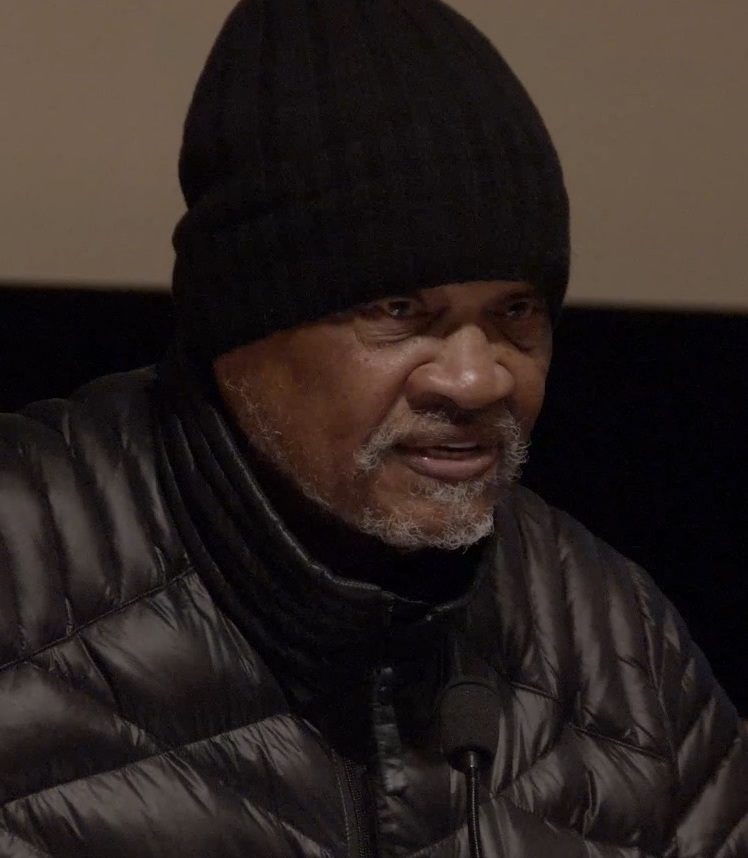
- Reed in 2019
- Born: Ishmael Scott Reed; February 22, 1938 (age 88); Chattanooga, Tennessee, U.S.
- Education: University at Buffalo
- Occupations: Poet; essayist; novelist; playwright; lyricist
- Spouse(s): Priscilla Thompson (m. 1960; divorced) Carla Blank (m. 1970)
- Children: 2
- Writing career
- Notable work: Full list
- Website: ishmaelreed.com

Ishmael Scott Reed (born February 22, 1938) is an American poet, novelist, essayist, songwriter, composer, playwright, editor and publisher known for his satirical works challenging American political culture. Perhaps his best-known work is Mumbo Jumbo (1972), a sprawling and unorthodox novel set in 1920s New York. Reed's work represents neglected African and African-American perspectives.

== Early life, family, and college drop out ==
Reed was born in Chattanooga, Tennessee. His family moved to Buffalo, New York, when he was a child, during the Great Migration. After attending local schools, Reed attended the University at Buffalo, though he withdrew from college in his junior year, partly for financial reasons, but mainly because he felt he needed a new atmosphere to support his writing and music. He said of this decision: "This was the best thing that could have happened to me at the time because I was able to continue experimenting along the lines I wanted, influenced by Nathanael West and others. I didn't want to be a slave to somebody else's reading lists. I kind of regret the decision now because I've gotten some of the most racist and horrible things said to me because of this."

Reed said in a 2022 interview for World Literature Today: "I come from a family of Tennessee fighters. Like my mother, who was abandoned and had to make do with her skills. She organized two strikes. One of the strikes was of the maids at a hotel in Buffalo. The other was at a department store, where the Black women were assigned to do stock work and the white women were salespersons. She became the first Black salesperson as a result of the strike. She wrote a book I deeply admire called Black Girl from Tannery Flats. But when she died, her achievement was that she became a salesperson. She was a fighter."

== Career ==
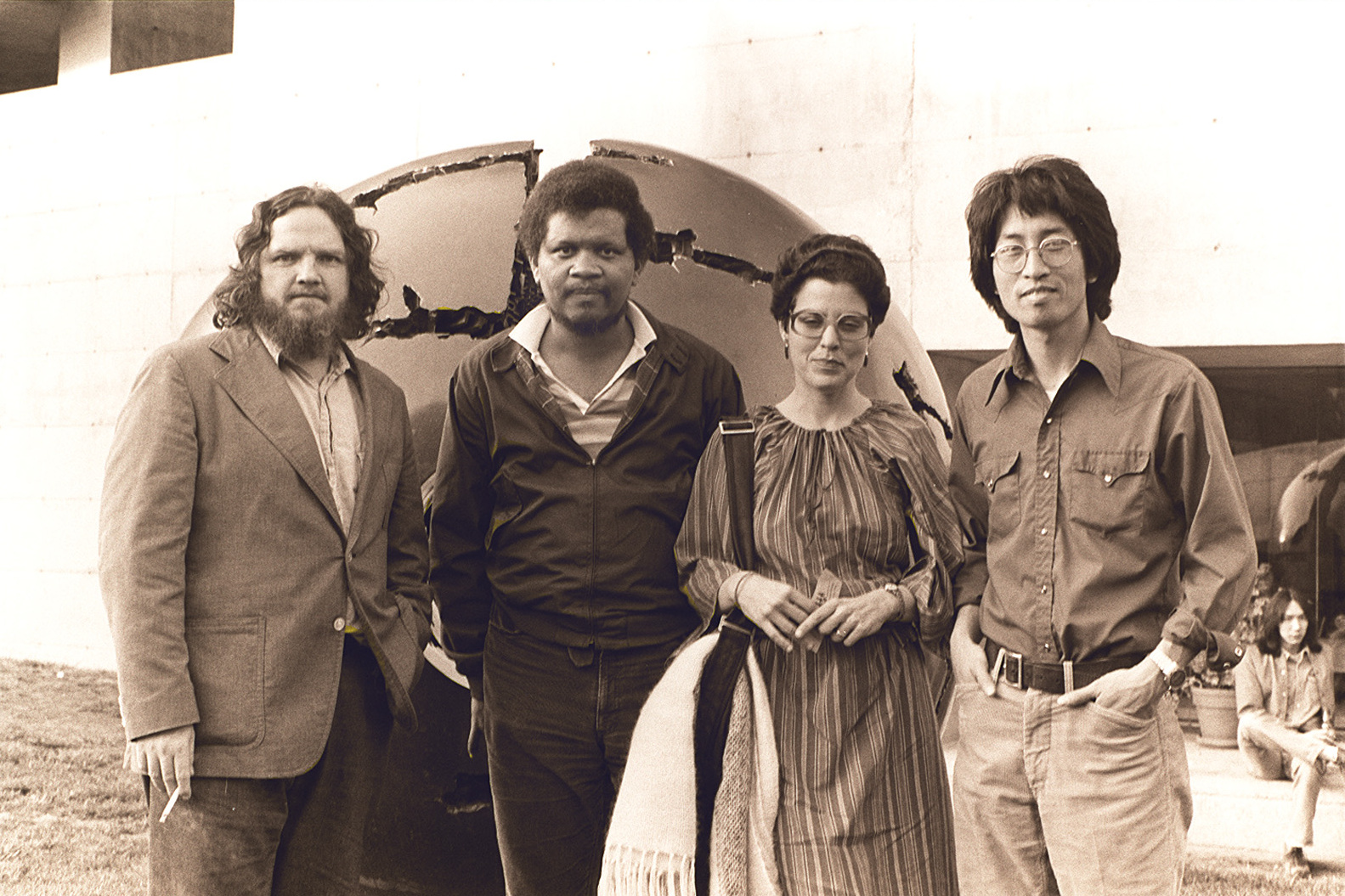
Bob Callahan, Reed, Carla Blank, Shawn Wong in 1975

In 1962, Reed moved to the Lower East Side of New York City, and founded Advance, a community newspaper for Newark, New Jersey, as well as co-founding with Walter Bowart the East Village Other, which became a well-known underground publication. Reed was also a member of the Umbra Writers Workshop (he attended his first Umbra meeting in Spring 1963, with others present including Lorenzo Thomas, Askia Touré, Charles Patterson, David Henderson, Albert Haynes, and Calvin Hernton), some of whose members helped establish the Black Arts Movement and promoted a Black Aesthetic. Although Reed never participated in that movement, he has continued to research the history of black Americans. While working on his novel Flight to Canada (1976), he coined the term "Neo-Slave narrative", which he used in 1984 in "A Conversation with Ishmael Reed" by Reginald Martin. During this time, Reed also made connections with musicians and poets such as Sun Ra, Cecil Taylor, and Albert Ayler, which contributed to Reed's vast experimentation with jazz and his love for music.

Reed has served as editor and publisher of various small presses and journals since the early 1970s. These include Yardbird Reader (which he edited from 1972 to 1976), and Reed, Cannon and Johnson Communications, an independent publishing house begun with Steve Cannon and Joe Johnson that focused on multicultural literature in the 1970s. The first title published by Reed, Cannon & Johnson in 1974 was Francisco by Alison Mills (reissued by New Directions in 2023).

Reed's current publishing imprint is Ishmael Reed Publishing Company, and his online literary publication, Konch Magazine (produced since 1990), features an international mix of poetry, essays and fiction. In 1970, Reed moved to the West Coast to begin teaching at the University of California, Berkeley, where he taught for 35 years, retiring from there in 2005. He serves as a Distinguished Professor at California College of the Arts.

Among the writers first published by Reed when they were students in his writing workshops are Terry McMillan, Mona Simpson, Mitch Berman, Kathryn Trueblood, Danny Romero, Fae Myenne Ng, Brynn Saito, Mandy Kahn, John Keene, and Frank B. Wilderson III. Reed was one of the producers of The Domestic Crusaders, a two-act play about Muslim Pakistani Americans written by his former student, Wajahat Ali. Its first act was performed at the Kennedy Center's Millennium Hall in Washington, D.C., on November 14, 2010, archived on the center's website.

Reed is the founder of the Before Columbus Foundation – an organization dedicated to the promotion of contemporary multicultural literature by American writers. Snce 1980 the foundation has annually presented the American Book Awards, "created to provide recognition for outstanding literary achievement from the entire spectrum of America's diverse literary community." He also founded the Oakland chapter of PEN, known as the "blue-collar PEN", which also gives annual awards to writers.

Reed's archives are held by the Special Collections at the University of Delaware in Newark. Ishmael Reed: An Exhibition, curated by Timothy D. Murray, was shown at the University of Delaware Library from August 16 to December 16, 2007. established a three-year collaboration between the non-profit and Oakland-based Second Start Literacy Project in 1998. A 1972 manifesto inspired a major visual art exhibit, NeoHooDoo: Art for a Forgotten Faith, curated by Franklin Sirmans for the Menil Collection in Houston, Texas, where it opened on June 27, 2008, and subsequently traveled to P.S. 1 Contemporary Art Center in New York City, and the Miami Art Museum through 2009. Between 2012 and 2016, Reed served as the first SF Jazz Poet Laureate from SF JAZZ, the leading non-profit jazz organization on the West Coast. An installation of his poem "When I Die I Will Go to Jazz" appears on the SFJAZZ Center's North Gate in Linden Alley. His poem "Just Rollin' Along", about the 1934 encounter between Bonnie and Clyde and Oakland Blues artist L. C. Good Rockin' Robinson, is included in The Best American Poetry 2019.

== Influences ==
Speaking about his influences, Reed has said, "I've probably been more influenced by poets than by novelists—the Harlem Renaissance poets, the Beat poets, the American surrealist Ted Joans. Poets have to be more attuned to originality, coming up with lines and associations the ordinary prose writer wouldn't think of." Among writers from the Harlem Renaissance for whose work Reed has expressed admiration are Langston Hughes, Zora Neale Hurston, George Schuyler, Bruce Nugent, Countee Cullen, Rudolph Fisher and Arna Bontemps. In Chris Jackson's interview of Reed in the Fall 2016 edition of The Paris Review, Reed discusses many literary influences, including Dante, the Celtic Revival poets, James Baldwin, George Schuyler, Nathanael West, Bob Kaufman, and Charles Wright.

== Style and themes ==
Reed said in a 2011 interview with Parul Sehgal: "My work holds up the mirror to hypocrisy, which puts me in a tradition of American writing that reaches back to Nathaniel Hawthorne." Reed has also been quoted as saying: "So this is what we want: to sabotage history. They won't know whether we're serious or whether we are writing fiction ... Always keep them guessing."

Conjugating Hindi was deeply compelled by Reed's ideas of depicting a unification of multiple cultures. In this novel, he explores the congruencies and differences of African-American and South Asian American cultures though political discourse posed by white neo-conservative Americans toward both ethnicities. As described in the Los Angeles Review of Books, "it is brilliant — the same sort of experimental brilliance observable in the fiction of Thomas Pynchon or the cut-up technique of William S. Burroughs — and more accessible. ...Conjugating Hindi is a firebrand's novel, the crackling, overflowing, pugnacious novel of someone who doesn't care about genre boundaries any more than he cares about historical boundaries, but who does care deeply about innovating."

== Music ==
Reed has been the central participant in the longest ongoing music/poetry collaboration, known as Conjure projects, produced by Kip Hanrahan on American Clavé: Conjure I (1984) and Conjure II (1988), which were reissued by Rounder Records in 1995; and Conjure Bad Mouth (2005), whose compositions were developed in live Conjure band performances, from 2003 to 2004, including engagements at Paris's Banlieues Bleues, London's Barbican Centre, and the Blue Note Café in Tokyo. The Village Voice ranked the 2005 Conjure CD one of the four best vocal albums released in 2006.

In 2007, Reed made his debut as a jazz pianist and bandleader with For All We Know by The Ishmael Reed Quintet. After he was invited by designer Grace Wales Bonner to play jazz piano accompanying her 2019 fashion show at the Serpentine Gallery in London, he received publicity in Harper's Bazaar and Vogue. In 2008, Reed was honored as Blues Songwriter of the Year from the West Coast Blues Hall of Fame Awards. A David Murray CD released in 2009, The Devil Tried to Kill Me, includes two songs with lyrics by Reed: "Africa", sung by Taj Mahal, and the title song performed by SF-based rapper Sista Kee. On September 11, 2011, in a Jazz à la Villette concert at the Grande Halle in Paris, the Red Bull Music Academy World Tour premiered three new songs with lyrics by Ishmael Reed, performed by Macy Gray, Tony Allen, members of The Roots, David Murray and his Big Band, Amp Fiddler and Fela! singer/dancers. In 2013, David Murray, with vocalists Macy Gray and Gregory Porter, released the CD Be My Monster Love, with three new songs with lyrics by Reed: "Army of the Faithful", "Hope is a Thing With Feathers", and the title track, "Be My Monster Love".

In 2022, Reed released his first album of original compositions, The Hands of Grace. followed by Every Time I Feel the Spirit in 2026.In 2023, Konch Records released Blues Lyrics by Ishmael Reed, on which Reed reads his poetry with the East Coast Blues Caravan of All Stars featuring Ronnie Stewart, and guest artist David Murray..

== Personal life ==
In 1960, Reed married Priscilla Thompson. Their daughter, Timothy (1960–2021), was born the same year. Timothy dedicated her semi-autobiographical book Showing Out (Thunder's Mouth Press, 2003) to her father. Reed and Thompson divorced in 1970. Since 1970, he has been married to noted author, choreographer, and director Carla Blank. Their daughter, Tennessee, is also an author, and is managing editor of Konch Magazine. Reed lives in Oakland, California.

== Accolades ==
External videos
- You can view a C-SPAN interview, in which Ishmael Reed discusses his life, work, and career, right here.

Organizations	Year	Award	Result	Ref.
National Book Awards	1973	Conjure / Mumbo Jumbo	Nominated	
Pulitzer Prize	1973	Conjure	Nominated	
Guggenheim Foundation	1975	Writing Fellowship	Honored	
University at Buffalo	1995	Honorary Doctorate	Honored	
Lila Wallace Association	1997	"Reader's Digest" Award	Honored	
John D. and Catherine T. MacArthur Foundation	1997	Fellowship award	Honored	
Bay Area Book Reviewers Association	1999	Fred Cody Award	Honored	
Otto René Castillo	2002	Political Theatre Award	Honored	
San Francisco literary festival	2011	Barbary Coast Award	Honored	
Just Buffalo Literary Center	2014	Literary Legacy Award	Honored	
Alberto Dubito International	2016	International prize	Honored	
AUDELCO Awards	2017	Pioneer Award for the Theater	Honored	
The University of California	2020	Distinguished Emeritus Awardee	Honored	
Anisfield-Wolf Book Award	2022	Lifetime Achievement Award	Honored	
Hurston/Wright Foundation	2023	Lifetime Achievement Award	Honored	

== Bibliography ==
=== Novels and short fiction ===
- The Freelance Pallbearers, 1967
- Yellow Back Radio Broke-Down, 1969
- Mumbo Jumbo, 1972
- The Last Days of Louisiana Red, 1974
- Flight to Canada, 1976
- The Terrible Twos, 1982
- Reckless Eyeballing, 1986
- The Terrible Threes, 1989
- Japanese by Spring, 1993
- Juice!, 2011
- Conjugating Hindi, 2018
- "The Fool Who Thought Too Much" (short story), 2020
- The Terrible Fours, 2021
- The Man Who Haunted Himself, 2022
- The Terrible Fives, 2026

=== Poetry and other collected works ===
- catechism of d neoamerican hoodoo church, 1969
- Cab Calloway Stands in for the Moon or D Hexorcism of Noxon D Awful, 1970
- Neo-HooDoo Manifesto, 1972
- Conjure: Selected Poems, 1963–1970, 1972
- Chattanooga: Poems, 1973
- A Secretary to the Spirits, illustrated by Betye Saar, 1978
- New and Collected Poetry, 1988
- The Reed Reader, 2000
- New and Collected Poems, 1964–2006, 2006 (hardcover); New and Collected Poems, 1964–2007, 2007 (paperback)
- Why the Black Hole Sings the Blues, 2020

=== Plays and librettos ===
- The Wild Gardens of the Loup Garou, with poetry by Reed and Colleen McElroy and music by Carman Moore (1981, 1989).
- Gethsemane Park, libretto; Carman Moore, composer (premiere, Berkeley Black Repertory Theater, 1998).
- Ishmael Reed, THE PLAYS, a collection of six plays published by Dalkey Archive Press (2009), as listed with date of premiere: Mother Hubbard (1979 and revised in 1997 into a musical version); Savage Wilds (1988 Part I; 1990, Part II); Hubba City (1989, 1994); The Preacher and the Rapper (1995); C Above C Above High C (1997); Body Parts (2007), a play developed from a work first performed as Tough Love (2004).
- The Final Version, premiered at the Nuyorican Poets Café in December 2013.
- Life Among the Aryans, premiered in full production at the Nuyorican Poets Café in June 2018. Archway Editions, 2022.
- The Haunting of Lin-Manuel Miranda, premiered in full production at the Nuyorican Poets Café in May 2019, published by Archway Editions in 2020.
- The Slave Who Loved Caviar, premiered in a virtual reading sponsored by the Nuyorican Poets Café in March 2021; a full production premiered December 23, 2021, at Theater for the New City. Archway Editions, October 2023.
- The Conductor, premiered in a full production at Theater for the New City on March 9, 2023, and returned for a second three-week run, August 24–September 10, 2023.
- The Shine Challenge 2024. premiered as a virtual staged reading sponsored by the Nuyorican Poets Cafe through April 15, 2024.
- The Shine Challenge 2025 premiered in a full production sponsored by Theater for the New City, January 30, 2025
- The Amanuensis, premiered in a full production at the Berkeley Black Repertory Group in October 2026.
- KIng Ludd's Revenge, premiered in staged readings at Theater 33 in San Francisco and The American Theatre of Actors in New York City in December 2026.

=== Non-fiction ===
- Shrovetide in Old New Orleans: Essays, Atheneum, 1978
- God Made Alaska for the Indians: Selected Essays, Garland, 1982
- Writin' Is Fightin': Thirty-seven Years of Boxing On Paper. New York: Atheneum, 1989
- Airing Dirty Laundry. New York: Addison-Wesley, 1993
- Oakland Rhapsody, The Secret Soul Of An American Downtown. Introduction and Commentary by Ishmael Reed and photographs by Richard Nagler. North Atlantic Books, 1995
- Blues City: A Walk in Oakland, Crown Journeys, 2003
- Another Day at the Front: Dispatches from the Race War, Basic Books, 2003
- Mixing It Up: Taking on the Media Bullies and Other Reflections, Da Capo Press, 2008
- Barack Obama and the Jim Crow Media: The Return of the "Nigger Breakers", Baraka Books, 2010
- Going Too Far: Essays About America's Nervous Breakdown, Baraka Books, 2012
- The Complete Muhammad Ali, Baraka Books, July 2015
- "Jazz Musicians as Pioneer Multi-Culturalists, the Co-Optation of Them, and the Reason Jazz Survives" in American Multiculturalism in Context, Views from at Home and Abroad, edited by Sami Ludwig, Cambridge Scholars Publishing, 2017, pp. 189–199
- Why No Confederate Statues in Mexico, a collection of new and collected essays, Baraka Books, 2019
- Malcolm and Me, written and narrated by Reed, Audible, 2020
- William Demby: Goth Before It Was Cool, Enigma Editions, 2027

=== Anthologies edited by Reed ===
- 19 Necromancers From Now, Doubleday & Co., 1970
- Calafia: The California Poetry, Yardbird Pub. Co., 1978, ISBN 978-0931676031
- Yardbird Lives!, co-edited with Al Young, Grove Press, 1978, ISBN 978-0394170411
- QUILT #1, Ishmael Reed & Al Young, 1981. ISBN 0931676053
- QUILT #2, A special issue devoted to the stories of students at University of California Berkeley. Ishmael Reed & Al Young, 1981. ISBN 9780931676062
- The Before Columbus Foundation Fiction Anthology, Selections from the American Book Awards 1980–1990, co-edited with Kathryn Trueblood and Shawn Wong, W. W. Norton, 1991, ISBN 978-0393308334
- The HarperCollins Literary Mosaic Series, General Editor of four anthologies edited by Gerald Vizenor, Shawn Wong, Nicolas Kanellos and Al Young, 1995–96
- MultiAmerica: Essays on Cultural Wars and Cultural Peace, Viking/Penguin, 1997, ISBN 978-0140259124
- From Totems to Hip-Hop: A Multicultural Anthology of Poetry Across the Americas, 1900–2001, Da Capo Press, 2003, ISBN 978-1560254584
- Pow Wow: 63 Writers Address the Fault Lines in the American Experience, short fiction anthology, edited with Carla Blank, Da Capo Press, 2009, ISBN 1568583400
- Black Hollywood Unchained, non-fiction anthology, edited and with an Introduction by Reed, Third World Press, October 2015, ISBN 978-0883783535
- Bigotry on Broadway, co-edited with Carla Blank, with an Introduction by Reed, Baraka Books, September 2021 ISBN 1771862564
- The Plague Edition of Konch Magazine, co-edited with Tennessee Reed, Ishmael Reed Publishing Co., 2024
- Blind Persistence: The History of the Before Columbus Foundation, co-edited with Justin Desmangles, Baraka Books, 2025, ISBN 9781771863988

=== Forewords ===
- The Adventures of Tom Sawyer / Adventures of Huckleberry Finn (Signet Classic Edition, 2013)
- The Collected Novels of Charles Wright (Harper Perennial, 2019)
- Cimarron: Freedom and Masquerade (Thames & Hudson, 2019)
- Surviving Financially in a Rigged System (Third World Press Foundation, 2019)
- John Oliver Killens's The Minister Primarily (Amistad, 2021)
- Selected Poems of Calvin C. Hernton (2023)
- John A. Williams' novel, The Man Who Cried I Am (Library of America, 2023)
- Awol Erizku's Mystic Parallax (Aperture, 2023).

== Filmography ==
Year	Title	Director	Role	Notes	Ref.
1980	Personal Problems	Bill Gunn	Producer	Experimental soap opera	
1990	James Baldwin: The Price of the Ticket	Karen Thorsen	Himself	Documentary; Archival footage	
2008	Boogie Man: The Lee Atwater Story	Stefan Forbes	Himself	Documentary; Interview clips	
2012	United States of HooDoo	Oliver Hardt and Darius James	Himself	Documentary; Interview clips	
2013	Richard Pryor: Omit the Logic	Marina Zenovich	Himself	Documentary	
2018	I Am Richard Pryor	Jesse James Miller	Himself	Documentary	
2021	Bad Attitude: The Art of Spain Rodriguez	Susan Stern	Himself	Documentary	

== Discography ==
Kip Hanrahan has released three albums featuring lyrics by Reed:

- Conjure: Music for the Texts of Ishmael Reed (American Clave, 1985)
- Conjure: Cab Calloway Stands in for the Moon (American Clave, 1985)
- Conjure: Bad Mouth (American Clave, 2005)

David Murray has released several albums featuring lyrics by Reed:

- Sacred Ground (Justin Time, 2007) – "Sacred Ground" and "The Prophet of Doom" sung by Cassandra Wilson
- The Devil Tried to Kill Me (Justin Time, 2009) – "The Devil Tried to Kill Me" sung by Sista Kee and "Africa" sung by Taj Mahal
- Be My Monster Love (Motéma, 2013) – "Be My Monster Love" sung by Macy Gray and "Army of the Faithful (Joyful Noise)" and "Hope Is a Thing with Feathers" sung by Gregory Porter
- blues for memo (Doublemoon Records, 2016) – "Red Summer" sung by Pervis Evans

Yosvany Terry has released one album including lyrics by Reed:

- New Throned Kings (SPassion 2014), CD nominated for a 2014 Grammy Award, with Ishmael Reed's lyrics on "Mase Nadodo".

Releases produced by Ishmael Reed:

- His Bassist (Konch Records, Ishmael Reed, producer), featuring Ortiz Walton and including collaborations based on Reed's poetry, 2014
- For All We Know (Ishmael Reed Publishing, 2007), with the Ishmael Reed quintet, features David Murray (sax, bass clarinet and piano), and Carla Blank (violin), Roger Glenn (flute), Chris Planas (guitar), and Ishmael Reed (piano) on nine jazz standards, and three original collaborations with text by Reed and music composed by David Murray, were first performed by Ishmael Reed on this privately produced CD. David Murray then wrote different compositions for these Reed lyrics for the film and CD Sacred Ground.
- Blues Lyrics by Ishmael Reed (Konch Records, 2023), with the West Coast Blues Caravan of All Stars: Art Hafen (trombone), Gregory "Gman" Simmons (bass), Michael Skinner (drums), Ronnie Stewart (drums and guitar), Michael Robinson (keyboard) with David Murray (saxophone) and Ishmael Reed (vocalist).

Releases with music composed and performed by Ishmael Reed (piano):

- The Hands of Grace (Reading Group, 2022), with Roger Glenn (flute and sax), Ray Obiedo (guitar), Carla Blank (violin), Ronnie Stewart (electric guitar) and poet Tennessee Reed.
- Every Time I Feel the Spirit (Reading Group, 2026), a limited edition 2 CD composed, performed and recorded at home by Ishmael Reed, 2021-2026.

== Selected public art installations ==
- 1972: "from the files of agent 22", Reed's poem, was posted in New York City buses and subways, by Poetry in Public Places, during an American International Sculptors Symposium project.
- 2004: A bronze plaque of Reed's poem "Going East", installed in the Berkeley Poetry Walk in Berkeley, California, designated a National Poetry Landmark by the Academy of American Poets
- 2010–13: A collaborative public art installation work, Moving Richmond, for Richmond, California's BART station, incorporates two Reed poems, written for this project after meetings with Richmond residents, into two mounted iron sculptures by Mildred Howard.
- 2011: "beware do not read this poem". Included in stone installation and audio recording by Rochester Poets Walk, Rochester, New York.
- 2013: SF JAZZ Center, which opened in January 2013, installs Reed's poem "When I Die I Will Go to Jazz" on the center's North Gate in Linden Alley.
- 2017: LIT CITY banner along Washington Street in Buffalo, New York, as part of a celebration of the city's literary history.
