= Alison Mills Newman =

American writer, chaplain and former actress

Alison Mills Newman is a writer, chaplain, and former actress. Her autofictional debut novel Francisco, a chronicle of Black bohemian life in San Francisco, originally published in 1974 by Ishmael Reed, was reissued in 2023 to acclaim. She was the first African-American teenage actress on a television series, playing Carol Deering in the sitcom Julia.

Mills Newman has said she decided to be an actress when she was 12 years old, and participated in theater projects with Maya Angelou under the direction of Frank Silvera. She left Hollywood in her twenties, focusing on poetry and music. She sang and performed alongside jazz musicians Ornette Coleman, Don Cherry, Weather Report, and Taj Mahal. Newman wrote Francisco on roadtrips with her future husband, Francisco Toscano Newman.

Francisco was rediscovered when Jeffrey Yang, an editor at New Directions, heard of the book in an article by poet and academic Harryette Mullen but was unable to find a copy. The only edition had been printed 50 years earlier by Reed, Cannon & Johnson, a small independent press in Berkeley, founded by writers Ishmael Reed, Steve Cannon, and Joe Johnson. He contacted Mills Newman, and she emailed him a photocopy of the text in March 2021. "I was really floored," Yang said. The book was reissued by New Directions in 2023.

In the foreword for Francisco, Saidiya Hartman calls the novel "a portrait of the artist as a young Black woman." Stephen Kearse, writing for The Nation, wrote that "Francisco is a novel that is very much of the Black arts Movement."

Newman's second novel, Maggie 3, was published in 2007 by the Ishmael Reed Publishing Company.
