= Toyin Adewale-Gabriel =

Nigerian poet (born 1969)

- Born: Toyin Adewale; 1969 (age 56–57); Ibadan, Oyo State, Nigeria
- Education: Obafemi Awolowo University, Ile-Ife
- Occupations: Writer, novelist
- Years active: 1995–present

Toyin Adewale-Gabriel (born 1969) is a Nigerian writer. She writes poetry and has worked as a literary critic for The Guardian, Post Express and The Daily Times. Adewale-Gabriel writes in both English and in German.

== Biography ==
Born in Ibadan, Nigeria, Toyin received her M.A. Lit. degree from Obafemi Awolowo University. She was the co-founder and coordinator for several years of the Association of Writers of Nigeria. Toyin is also a Fellow of Akademie Schloss Solitude and has been Writer in Residence at the Villa Waldberta, Munich and The Baltic Centre for Writers and Translators, Visby, Sweden. In a Brittle paper interview with Umezurike, Toyin mentioned that she loved Mary Oliver and that she's partial to Russian and Latin-American poetry.

== Works ==
Her works include Naked Testimonies, 1995; Breaking The Silence, 1996; Inkwells, 1997; Die Aromaforscherin, 1998; Flackernde Kerzen, 1999; 25 New Nigerian Poets, 2000; Aci Cikolata, Gunizi Yayincilik, 2003; and Nigerian Women Short Stories, 2005. She has also won awards for poetry and short fiction.

Naked Testimonies deals with Nigerian politics, and the poems are reflective and personal.
