= Trueblood Committee =

The Trueblood Committee was a study group formed by the American Institute of Certified Public Accountants (AICPA) in 1972 to develop the Objective of Financial Statements.

The committee's goal was to help accountants create financial statements that provided external users with sufficient information to make educated decisions about the economics of companies. In 1978, the Financial Accounting Standards Board (FASB) adopted the key objectives established by the Trueblood Committee.

The Trueblood Committee was named for its chairman Robert M. Trueblood. His previously served on the executive committees of both the American Institute of Certified Public Accountants (AICPA) and the Accounting Principles Board (APB) .

The AICPA began hunting for new objectives of financial statements because prior to the development of the Trueblood Committee many accountants were confused and dissatisfied with the current objectives. Identifying the objectives to financial statements was the purpose behind the creation of the Trueblood Committee. The committee's mission was to create the objectives in a way that would be more easily understandable by accountants and also more relatable to their work.

The two key concepts to take away from the findings of the Trueblood Committee are:

- The basic objective of financial statements is to provide useful information to external users for making decisions about a company.
- The management of a business is responsible for effectively using resources to achieve maximum profits.
