= Kathryn Trueblood =

American writer

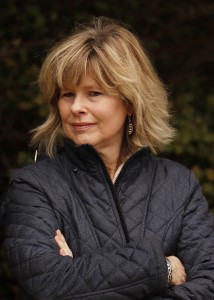
- Education: University of California, Berkeley; University of Washington
- Occupation(s): Professor of English; Writer
- Employer: Western Washington University
- Website: kathryntrueblood.com

Kathryn Trueblood is an American author. She is most known as a writer of fiction whose work focuses on the medical humanities. She is the recipient of the Goldenberg Prize for Fiction from the Bellevue Literary Review and the 2011 Red Hen Press Short Story Award. Trueblood's work has been critically well received by major publishing trade magazines like Kirkus Reviews and Publishers Weekly.

Trueblood was born and raised in California. She attended the Avalon School, a unified K-12 school on Catalina Island. She matriculated from University of California, Berkeley, and went on to study at University of Washington, where she earned a Master of Fine Arts degree. She now lives in Washington.

Trueblood has twice been diagnosed with a chronic illness—first Graves disease, and then Crohn's. She has been frank about the challenges of parenting with a chronic illness and the influences this has on her writing.

== Bibliography ==
- The Sperm Donor's Daughter (1998) Permanent Press
- The Baby Lottery (2007) Permanent Press
- Diary of a Slut (2014) SheBooks
- Take Daily as Needed (2019) University of New Mexico Press
