= Lewis de Claremont =

American occult writer

Lewis de Claremont, also spelled Louis de Clermont, was the pseudonym of an American author on occultism who flourished during the 1930s.

Books attributed to de Claremont include 7 Steps to Power, 7 Keys to Success, The Ancient's Book of Magic, The Ancient Book of Formulas, and Legends of Incense, Herb, and Oil Magic. Although authorship of his writings was claimed by the publisher Joseph Kay (Joseph Spitalnick) for purposes of copyright renewal, this claim has been easily disproved, and it is speculated that the author was also the proprietor of the Oracle Products Company, a spiritual supply house specializing in African-American hoodoo goods in New York City, who also used the name Mr. Young.

Under the name Mr. Young, he may also have been the ghost-writer of the "autobiography" of Benjamin Rucker, an African-American stage magician professionally known as Black Herman.

Many of de Claremont's titles have been reprinted by a variety of publishers and remain in print.
