= Black Herman =

American stage magician

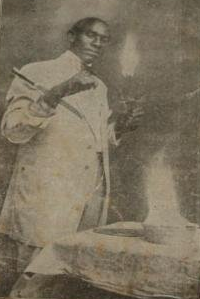
- Born: Benjamin Rucker; 1892; Amherst, Virginia, U.S.
- Died: April 15, 1934 (aged 41–42); Louisville, Kentucky, U.S.
- Resting place: New York City, U.S.
- Occupation: Magician

Benjamin Rucker (1892 – April 15, 1934) was an American stage magician, better known by his stage name Black Herman. He was the most prominent African-American magician of his time.

He appears as a major character in Ishmael Reed's 1972 novel Mumbo-Jumbo.

== Early life ==
Rucker was born in Amherst, Virginia in 1892. Little is known about his origins, especially since Rucker told audiences of more exotic fictional backstories. He often claimed to have been born into a Zulu tribe and to have spent his childhood in the jungles of Africa.

== Career ==
Rucker learned the art of staged illusions from a performer called Prince Herman, who was first his teacher and later his partner. The pair sold patent medicine as well as performing prestidigitation, making their act as much a medicine show as a stage show. When Prince Herman died in 1909, Rucker adopted the name "Black Herman" in homage to his late friend. Black Herman then continued to tour, focusing on the stage act and dropping the medicine show aspects of his performance.

Eventually, Black Herman made Harlem his home base. Jim Crow policies were in effect at that time, so in the Northern states he could perform before racially mixed audiences, but when he traveled through the South — often with his own tent show ― segregation laws kept his audiences primarily black. His specialties included the Asrah levitation, the production of rabbits, release from knots tied by audience members, and a "buried alive" act which began with his interment in an outdoor area called "Black Herman's Private Graveyard" and continued three days later with his exhumation, revival and a walk to the stage venue, where he performed the rest of his show.

== Publication ==
Black Herman authored Secrets of Magic, Mystery, and Legerdemain. First published in 1925, it contains his semi-fictionalized autobiography, directions for simple illusions suitable to the novice stage magician, advice on astrology and lucky numbers, and a sampling of African-American hoodoo folk magic customs and practices. An announcement on the book's title page, "Black Herman Comes Through Every Seven Years", referred to Herman's pattern of returning to venues on a regular basis; the book was sold at his performances.

== Death ==
Black Herman died on April 15, 1934, at age 44, in Louisville, Kentucky, presumably the result of a heart attack. Despite sensational stories saying Herman died after collapsing during his show, press reports and Herman's own death certificate indicate that he died at a boarding house he and his troupe were staying at in Louisville. Due to the fame of his "buried alive" act, many people refused to believe he was really dead, and thus it came about that his assistant, Washington Reeves, charged admission to view Rucker's corpse at the funeral home, bringing a dramatic close to a life spent in showmanship. He was buried in the Woodlawn Cemetery in Bronx, New York City.

== Publication ==
- Black Herman's Secrets of Magic-Mystery & Legerdemain (1925) and republished many times
