= List of speculative poets =

This is a list of speculative poets. People on this list should have articles of their own, and should meet the Wikipedia notability guidelines for their poetry. Please place names on the list only if there is a real and existing article on the poet.

- Duane Ackerson
- Linda Addison
- Neil Aitken
- Brian Aldiss
- Mike Allen
- Robert H. Barlow
- Rosebud Ben-Oni
- Ruth Berman
- Ambrose Bierce
- Michael Bishop
- G. Sutton Breiding
- Leigh Blackmore
- Bruce Boston
- Ray Bradbury
- Joseph Payne Brennan
- Lin Carter
- Beth Cato
- Adam Cornford
- Mary Elizabeth Counselman
- L. Sprague de Camp
- Thomas M. Disch
- Leah Bodine Drake
- Russell Edson
- Amal El-Mohtar
- Suzette Haden Elgin
- Robert Frazier
- Nora May French
- Neil Gaiman
- Theodora Goss
- Vince Gotera
- Daphne Gottlieb
- Neile Graham
- Scott E. Green
- Joe Haldeman
- Jeannine Hall Gailey
- Cathy Park Hong
- Akua Lezli Hope
- Robert E. Howard
- Charlee Jacob
- Andrew Joron
- Geoffrey A. Landis
- Ursula K. Le Guin
- Mary Soon Lee
- Juan Liscano
- Frank Belknap Long
- Samuel Loveman
- H.P. Lovecraft
- Brian Lumley
- Arthur Machen
- Harry Martinson
- Eugenio Montejo
- Edwin Morgan
- H. Warner Munn
- Mari Ness
- AJ Odasso
- Eunice Odio
- Krysada Panusith Phounsiri
- Tim Pratt
- W.H. Pugmire
- John Reinhart
- Margaret Rhee
- Andrew L. Roberts
- Christina Rossetti
- John W. Sexton
- Delia Sherman
- Donald Sidney-Fryer
- Charles Simic
- Marge Simon
- Clark Ashton Smith
- Tracy K. Smith
- Midori Snyder
- Robin Spriggs
- George Sterling
- W. Gregory Stewart
- Sonya Taaffe
- Bogi Takács
- James Tate
- Sheree Renée Thomas
- Richard L. Tierney
- Mary A. Turzillo
- Catherynne M. Valente
- Jeff VanderMeer
- Karl Edward Wagner
- Donald Wandrei
- Kyla Ward
- William John Watkins
- Thomas Wiloch
- Laurel Winter
- T. Winter-Damon
- Terri Windling
- Bryan Thao Worra
- Jane Yolen

== See also ==
- Poetry
- Speculative poetry
- Speculative fiction

navigation list
