= Rhysling Award =

Award for best science fiction, fantasy or horror poetry

- Awarded for: Best speculative poetry of the prior year
- Country: United States
- Presented by: Science Fiction & Fantasy Poetry Association
- Website: http://www.sfpoetry.com/rhysling.html

The Rhysling Awards are an annual award given for the best science fiction, fantasy, or horror poem of the year. The award name was dubbed by Andrew Joron in reference to a character in a science fiction story: the blind poet Rhysling, in Robert A. Heinlein's short story "The Green Hills of Earth". The award is given in two categories: "Best Long Poem", for works of 50 or more lines, and "Best Short Poem", for works of 49 or fewer lines.

The nominees for each year's Rhysling Awards are chosen by the members of the Science Fiction Poetry Association (SFPA). Each member may nominate one work for each of the categories. Until 2022, all nominated works were compiled into an anthology called The Rhysling Anthology, and members of the Association would then vote on the final winners. In 2022, the process was changed such that the nominees are instead presented to a jury, who select no more than 50 finalists for the short award, and no more than 25 for the long award. Now only these finalist are compiled into the anthology and put to a final vote by the SFPA membership. From 2005 to 2011, the Awards were presented in July at a ceremony at Readercon. In 2022, eligibility guidelines were changed to exclude poems that qualify for the Dwarf Stars Award or the Elgin Awards.

In 2005, the SFPA published an anthology of the winning poems, The Alchemy of Stars: Rhysling Award Winners Showcase.

== Winners and runners-up ==
From 1978 to 1994, only a first-place winner was awarded. In 1995, a number of runners up were named and in 1996, a number of "Honorable Mentions" were given. Since 1997, 2nd and 3rd place have also been honored, and from 2020 onward, "Honorable Mentions" have been mentioned once again.

* Winners
† Second place
‡ Third place
Runners Up/Honorable Mentions

=== 1970s ===
Year	Category	Poem	Author(s)	Publication	Ref.
1978	Long	The Computer Iterates the Greater Trumps*	Gene Wolfe	Speculative Poetry Review	
1978	Short	Corruption of Metals*	Sonya Dorman	2076: The American Tricentennial, Pyramid Books	
1978	Short	Asleep in the Arms of Mother Night*	Andrew Joron	Speculative Poetry Review	
1978	Short	The Starman*	Duane Ackerson	Cthulhu Calls	
1979	Long	For the Lady of a Physicist*	Michael Bishop	Black Holes, Fawcett Books	
1979	Short	Fatalities*	Duane Ackerson	The Eggplant and Other Absurdities, Confluence Press	
1979	Short	Story Books and Treasure Maps*	Steve Eng	Equinox	

=== 1980s ===
Year	Category	Poem	Author(s)	Publication	Ref.
1980	Long	The Sonic Flowerfall of Primes*	Andrew Joron	New Worlds	
1980	Short	The Migration of Darkness*	Peter Payack	Asimov's Science Fiction	
1980	Short	Encased in the Amber of Eternity*	Robert Frazier	The Future at War	
1981	Long	On Science Fiction*	Thomas M. Disch	Triquarterly	
1981	Short	Meeting Place*	Ken Duffin	Asimov's Science Fiction	
1982	Long	The Well of Bain*	Ursula K. Le Guin	Hard Words & Other Poems, Harper & Row	
1982	Short	On the Speed of Sight*	Raymond DiZazzo	Uranus	
1983	Long	Your Time and You: A Neoprole's Dating Guide*	Adam Cornford	Velocities	
1983	Short	In Computers*	Alan P. Lightman	Science 82	
1984	Long	Saul's Death: Two Sestina's*	Joe W. Haldeman	Omni	
1984	Short	Two Sonnets*	Helen Ehrlich	Science 83	
1985	Long	A Letter from Caroline Herschel (1750-1848)*	Siv Cedering	Science 84	
1985	Short	For Spacers Snarled in the Hair of Comets*	Bruce Boston	Asimov's Science Fiction	
1986	Long	Shipwrecked on Destiny Five*	Andrew Joron	Asimov's Science Fiction	
1986	Short	The Neighbour's Wife*	Susan Palwick	Amazing Stories	
1987	Long	Daedalus*	W. Gregory Stewart	Star*Line	
1987	Short	A Dream of Heredity*	John Calvin Rezmerski	Tales of the Unanticipated	
1987	Short	Before the Big Bang: News from the Hubble Large Space Telescope*	Jonathan V. Post	Star*Line	
1988	Long	White Trains*	Lucius Shepard	Night Cry	
1988	Short	The Nightmare Collector*	Bruce Boston	Night Cry	
1988	Short	Rocky Road to Hoe*	Suzette Haden Elgin	Star*Line	
1989	Long	In the Darkened Hours*	Bruce Boston	The Nightmare Collector, 2AM	
1989	Long	Winter Solstice, Camelot Station*	John M. Ford	Invitation to Camelot, Ace Books	
1989	Short	Salinity*	Robert Frazier	Fantasy & Science Fiction	

=== 1990s ===
Year	Category	Poem	Author(s)	Publication	Ref.
1990	Long	dear spacemen*	Patrick McKinnon	Vice Versa	
1990	Short	Epitaph for Dreams*	G. Sutton Breiding	Narcopolis & Other Poems, Hell's Kitchen Productions	
1991	Long	The Aging Cryonicist in the Arms of His Mistress Contemplates the Survival of the Species While the Phoenix Is Consumed by Fire*	David Memmott	The Magazine of Speculative Poetry	
1991	Short	Eighteen Years Old, October Eleventh*	Joe W. Haldeman	Asimov's Science Fiction	
1992	Long	the button, and what you know*	W. Gregory Stewart	Amazing Stories	
1992	Short	Song of the Martian Cricket*	David Lunde	Asimov's Science Fiction	
1993	Long	To Be from Earth*	William J. Daciuk	Xizquil	
1993	Short	Will*	Jane Yolen	The Magazine of Speculative Poetry	
1994	Long	Basement Flats*	W. Gregory Stewart	Air Fish, Catseye Books	
1994	Long	Basement Flats*	Robert Frazier	Air Fish, Catseye Books	
1994	Short	Spacer's Compass*	Bruce Boston	Specula, Talisman	
1994	Short	Flight Is for Those Who Have Not Yet Crossed Over*	Jeff VanderMeer	The Silver Web	
1995	Long	Pilot, Pilot*	David Lunde	Star*Line	
1995	Long	A Life, Considered in Thirds, Set Against a Galactic Collapse	W. Gregory Stewart	Star*Line	
1995	Long	Partial People	Terry Bisson	Bears Discover Fire, Tor Books	
1995	Long	Homeflight	Alan Rice Osborn	Star*Line	
1995	Long	Between Test Patterns	W. Gregory Stewart	Antepenult, Dark Regions Press	
1995	Long	Fire, Ice	Joe Haldeman	Omni	
1995	Long	Dreaming Saturn	James S. Dorr	Dark Destiny, White Wolf Publishing	
1995	Short	Skin of Glass*	Dan Raphael	The Kore	
1995	Short	In These Hills	Denise Dumars	Star*Line	
1995	Short	Dinosaur Highway	Scott E. Green	Asimov's Science Fiction	
1995	Short	Elements of Love	Jonathan V. Post	Space and Time	
1996	Long	Variants of the Obsolete*	Marge Simon	Eonian Variations, The Selected Poetry of Marge Simon, Dark Regions Press	
1996	Long	The Westfarer	James S. Dorr	Dark Destiny: Proprietors of Fate, White Wolf Publishing	
1996	Short	Future Present: A Lesson in Expectation*	Bruce Boston	Asimov's Science Fiction	
1996	Short	Satan is a Mathematician	Keith Allen Daniels	Once Upon a Midnight, Unnameable Press	
1996	Short	Bilateral Symmetry	Denise Dumars	Space and Time	
1997	Long	Spotting UFOs While Canning Tomatoes*	Terry A. Garey	Serve It Forth, Warner Aspect	
1997	Long	Memories of My Mistress^{†}	Blythe Ayne	Mindsparks SF Poetry Anthology	
1997	Long	Canto (Evocare!)^{‡}	James S. Dorr	Dante's Disciples, White Wolf Press	
1997	Short	Day Omega*	W. Gregory Stewart	Asimov's Science Fiction	
1997	Short	Dash^{†}	Mary Turzillo	Tales of the Unanticipated	
1997	Short	Speaking Bones^{‡}	Denise Dumars	Speaking Bones, Dark Regions Press	
1998	Long	why goldfish shouldn't use power tools*	Laurel Winter	Asimov's Science Fiction	
1998	Long	Ghost Ships^{†}	Charlee Jacob	Asylums and Labyrinths	
1998	Long	Medusa's Daughter^{‡}	James S. Dorr	Star*Line	
1998	Short	Explaining Frankenstein to His Mother*	John Grey	Star*Line	
1998	Short	Shaman^{†}	Charlee Jacob	The Catbird Seat	
1998	Short	It's All Time-Machines, She Said^{‡}	Timons Esaias	Star*Line	
1998	Short	On Reading Bradbury^{‡}	Sandra Kasturi	Tesseracts 6, Tesseract Books	
1999	Long	Confessions of a Body Thief*	Bruce Boston	Talisman	
1999	Short	egg horror poem*	Laurel Winter	Asimov's Science Fiction	

=== 2000s ===
Year	Category	Poem	Author(s)	Publication	Ref.
2000	Long	Christmas (after we all get time machines)*	Geoffrey A. Landis	Asimov's Science Fiction	
2000	Long	Handwork^{†}	Rebecca Marjesdatter	Women of Other Wolds, University of Western Australia Press	
2000	Long	Salem Town^{‡}	Corrine De Winter	Gathering Darkness	
2000	Long	Impressions from Giger's "Necronomicons"^{‡}	Charlee Jacob	Dreams & Nightmares	
2000	Short	Grimoire*	Rebecca Marjesdatter	Tales of the Unanticipated	
2000	Short	Clark the Ripper^{†}	David C. Kopaska-Merkel	Dreams & Nightmares	
2000	Short	The Au Pair from Out There^{†}	Ann K. Schwader	Star*Line	
2000	Short	Brigit^{†}	Peggy J. Taylor	Calyx	
2000	Short	Silicon Trade Agreement^{‡}	Ruth Berman	Tales of the Unanticipated	
2000	Short	The Unfinished Map of the Sky^{‡}	G. O. Clark	Fantasque	
2000	Short	A Picture Postcard of the Cerne Abbas Giant^{‡}	David Lunde	Asimov's Science Fiction	
2000	Short	The Language of Rain^{‡}	Wendy Rathbone	Dreams & Nightmares	
2000	Short	song of a last duckbill^{‡}	W. Gregory Stewart	Star*Line	
2001	Long	January Fires*	Joe Haldeman	Asimov's Science Fiction	
2001	Long	Maya^{†}	James S. Dorr	Strange Attraction, Bereshith/Shadowlands Press	
2001	Long	Valley of Years^{†}	David C. Kopaska-Merkel	Results of a Preliminary Investigation of Electrochemical Properties of Some Organic Matrices, Eraserhead Press	
2001	Long	The Lesions of Genetic Sin^{‡}	Bruce Boston	Miniature Sun Press	
2001	Long	Event Horizons^{‡}	Gene van Troyer	Snow Monkey	
2001	Short	My Wife Returns As She Would Have It*	Bruce Boston	Asimov's Science Fiction	
2001	Short	Of Dance Steps and Distances^{†}	G. O. Clark	Icarus Ascending	
2001	Short	Reflections in a Fading "Mir"^{†}	Ann K. Schwader	Mythic Delirium	
2001	Short	Persephone Wakening^{‡}	Tracina Jackson-Adams	The Magazine of Speculative Poetry	
2002	Long	How to Make a Human*	Lawrence Schimel	Half-Human, Scholastic	
2002	Long	Pavane for a Cyber-Princess^{†}	Bruce Boston	Pavane for a Cyber-Princess, Miniature Sun Press	
2002	Long	In Bubastis^{†}	Denise Dumars	Star*Line	
2002	Long	Trouble With Math^{‡}	Roger Dutcher	Star*Line	
2002	Long	A Crash Course in Lemon Physics^{‡}	Robert Frazier	Strange Horizons	
2002	Short	We Die as Angels*	William John Watkins	Asimov's Science Fiction	
2002	Short	Threnody at Sea^{†}	Mark Rudolph	Strange Horizons	
2002	Short	True Love^{‡}	Ian Watson	Weird Tales	
2003	Long	Epochs in Exile: A Fantasy Trilogy*	Charles Sapiak	EOTU Ezine	
2003	Long	Epochs in Exile: A Fantasy Trilogy*	Mike Allen	EOTU Ezine	
2003	Long	Matlacihuatl's Gift*	Sonya Taffe	Dreams & Nightmares	
2003	Long	Medusa's Tale^{†}	David C. Kopaska-Merkel	Mythic Delirium	
2003	Long	Not One of Us^{‡}	Tyree Campbell	Sex and the Single Alien, Writer's Club Press	
2003	Short	Potherb Gardening*	Ruth Berman	Asimov's Science Fiction	
2003	Short	A Ghost Story^{†}	Mike Allen	Weird Tales	
2003	Short	meteor shower^{‡}	David C. Kopaska-Merkel	The Magazine of Speculative Poetry	
2004	Long	Octavia Is Lost in the Hall of Masks*	Theodora Goss	Mythic Delirium	
2004	Long	A Portrait of the Artist^{†}	Vandana Singh	Strange Horizons	
2004	Long	Hugo Schizofrenica^{‡}	Charlee Jacob	Miniature Sun Press	
2004	Short	Just Distance*	Roger Dutcher	Tales of the Unanticipated	
2004	Short	"Observe the Month of Spring"^{†}	Lucy Cohen Schmeidler	The Magazine of Speculative Poetry	
2004	Short	How I Will Outwit the Time Thieves^{‡}	Mike Allen	Strange Horizons	
2004	Short	Nursery Ghosts^{‡}	Sandra Lindow	Raven Electrick	
2005	Long	Soul Searching*	Tim Pratt	Strange Horizons	
2005	Long	Making Monsters^{†}	Tim Pratt	Strange Horizons	
2005	Long	The Night Watchman Dreams His Rounds at the REM Sleep Factory^{‡}	Mike Allen	Dreams & Nightmares	
2005	Short	No Ruined Lunar City*	Greg Beatty	Abyss & Apex	
2005	Short	The Clockmaker's Wife^{†}	Mikal Trimm	Star*Line	
2005	Short	Rich & Strange^{‡}	Ann K. Schwader	Strange Horizons	
2006	Long	The Tin Men*	Kendall Evans	The Magazine of Speculative Poetry	
2006	Long	The Tin Men*	David C. Kopaska-Merkel	The Magazine of Speculative Poetry	
2006	Long	Old Twentieth: a century full of years^{†}	Joe Haldeman	Readercon 16 Souvenir Book	
2006	Long	First Cross of Mars^{‡}	Drew Morse	Illumen	
2006	Short	The Strip Search*	Mike Allen	Strange Horizons	
2006	Short	Tsunami Child^{†}	David C. Kopaska-Merkel	Star*Line	
2006	Short	South^{‡}	Marge Simon	Illumen	
2007	Long	The Journey to Kailash*	Mike Allen	Strange Horizons	
2007	Long	The Eight Legs of Grandmother Spider^{†}	Catherynne M. Valente	Mythic	
2007	Long	Sleepers^{‡}	Samantha Henderson	Dreams & Nightmares	
2007	Short	The Graven Idol's Godheart*	Rich Ristow	The Shantytown Anomaly	
2007	Short	god is dead short live god^{†}	Joe Haldeman	Mythic	
2007	Short	Thirteen Ways of Looking at a Black Hole^{‡}	Lawrence Schimel	Helix	
2008	Long	The Seven Devils of Central California*	Catherynne M. Valente	Farrago's Wainscot	
2008	Long	In Deepspace Shadows^{†}	Kendall Evans	In Deepspace Shadows, Mythic Delirium Books	
2008	Long	The Engineer^{‡}	Bryan D. Dietrich	Isotope	
2008	Short	Eating Light*	F. J. Bergmann	Mythic Delirium	
2008	Short	Ice Palace^{†}	Margaret Atwood	The Door, McClelland & Stewart	
2008	Short	The Oracle on River Street^{‡}	Rachel Swirsky	Goblin Fruit	
2009	Long	Search*	Geoffrey A. Landis	Helix	
2009	Long	Hungry: Some Ghost Stories^{†}	Samantha Henderson	Lone Star Stories	
2009	Long	Damascus Divides the Lovers by Zero; or, The City Is Never Finished^{‡}	Amal El-Mohtar	Lone Star Stories	
2009	Long	Damascus Divides the Lovers by Zero; or, The City Is Never Finished^{‡}	Catherynne M. Valente	Lone Star Stories	
2009	Short	Songs to an Ancient City*	Amal El-Mohtar	Mythic Delirium	
2009	Short	Spell^{†}	Samantha Henderson	Goblin Fruit	
2009	Short	The Future^{‡}	Billy Collins	The New Yorker	

=== 2010s ===
Year	Category	Poem	Author(s)	Publication	Ref.
2010	Long	In the Astronaut Asylum*	Kendall Evans	Mythic Delirium	
2010	Long	In the Astronaut Asylum*	Samantha Henderson	Mythic Delirium	
2010	Long	Rattlebox III^{†}	Mike Allen	Strange Horizons	
2010	Long	Rattlebox III^{†}	Kendall Evans	Strange Horizons	
2010	Long	Rattlebox III^{†}	David C. Kopaska-Merkel	Strange Horizons	
2010	Long	The First Story^{‡}	Lana Hechtman Ayers	Hot Metal Press	
2010	Short	To Theia*	Ann K. Schwader	Strange Horizons	
2010	Short	The Changeling Always Wins^{†}	Nicole Kornher-Stace	Goblin Fruit	
2010	Short	Nine Views of the Oracle^{‡}	Rachel Manija Brown	Abyss & Apex	
2011	Long	The Sea King's Second Bride*	C. S. E. Cooney	Goblin Fruit	
2011	Long	Dark Rains Here and There^{†}	Bruce Boston	Dark Matters, Bad Moon Books	
2011	Long	Wreck-Diving the Spaceship^{‡}	Robert Frazier	Dreams & Nightmares	
2011	Short	Peach-Creamed Honey*	Amal El-Mohtar	The Honey Month, Papaveria Press	
2011	Short	Binary Creation Myth^{†}	Karen A. Romanko	Star*Line	
2011	Short	Dogstar Men^{‡}	C. S. E. Cooney	Apex Magazine	
2012	Long	The Curator Speaks in the Department of Dead Languages*	Megan Arkenberg	Stange Horizons	
2012	Long	The 25-Cent Rocket: One-Quarter of the Way to the Stars^{†}	G. O. Clark	Dreams & Nightmares	
2012	Long	The 25-Cent Rocket: One-Quarter of the Way to the Stars^{†}	Kendall Evans	Dreams & Nightmares	
2012	Long	The Legend of the Emperor's Space Suit (A Tale of Consensus Reality)^{‡}	Mary Turzillo	New Myths	
2012	Short	The Library, After*	Shira Lipkin	Mythic Delirium	
2012	Short	The Lend^{†}	Erik Amundsen	Stone Telling	
2012	Short	In Translation^{‡}	C. A. Gardner	Tales of the Talisman	
2013	Long	Into Flight*	Andrew Robert Sutton	Silver Blade	
2013	Long	String Theory^{†}	John Philip Johnson	Ad Astra	
2013	Long	The Necromantic Wine^{‡}	Wade German	Avatars of Wizardy, P'rea Press	
2013	Long	The Time Travelers Weekend^{‡}	Adele Gardner	Liquid Imagination	
2013	Short	The Cat Star*	Terry Garey	Lady Poetesses from Hell, Bag Person Press	
2013	Short	Futurity's Shoelaces^{†}	Marge Simon	Balticon 2012 Program Book	
2013	Short	Sister Philomena Heard the Voices of Angels^{‡}	Megan Arkenberg	Strange Horizons	
2014	Long	Interregnum*	Mary Soon Lee	Star*Line	
2014	Long	Hungry Constellations^{†}	Mike Allen	Goblin Fruit	
2014	Long	I will show you a single treasure from the treasures of Shah Niyaz^{‡}	Rose Lemberg	Goblin Fruit	
2014	Short	Turning the Leaves*	Amal El-Mohtar	Apex Magazine	
2014	Short	Rivers^{†}	Geoffrey A. Landis	Asimov's Science Fiction	
2014	Short	Music of the Stars^{‡}	Bruce Boston	Balticon 2013 Program Book	
2015	Long	100 Reasons to Have Sex with an Alien*	F. J. Bergmann	2014 SFPA Poetry Contest	
2015	Long	Six Things the Owl Said^{†}	Megan Arkenberg	Goblin Fruit	
2015	Long	The Perfect Library^{‡}	David Clink	If the World Were to Stop, Piquant Press	
2015	Short	Shutdown*	Marge Simon	Qualia Nous, Written Backwards	
2015	Short	Science Fiction (with apologies to Marianne Moore's “Poetry”)^{†}	Ruth Berman	Dreams & Nightmares	
2015	Short	I Imagine My Mother's Death^{‡}	Bryan D. Dietrich	The Pedestal Magazine	
2015	Short	The Peal Divers^{‡}	Francesca Forrest	Strange Horizons	
2015	Short	Extinction^{‡}	Joshua Gage	Star*Line	
2015	Short	After the Changeling Incantation^{‡}	John Philip Johnson	Strange Horizons	
2016	Long	It Begins With A Haunting*	Krysada Panusith Phounsiri	Dance Among Elephants, Sahtu Press	
2016	Long	Keziah*	Ann K. Schwader	Dark Energies, P'rea Press	
2016	Long	Chronopatetic^{†}	F. J. Bergmann	Dreams & Nightmares	
2016	Long	from "Sunspots"^{‡}	Simon Barraclough	Poetry	
2016	Long	The White Planet^{‡}	Albert Goldbarth	Boulevard	
2016	Short	Time Travel Vocabulary Problems*	Ruth Berman	Dreams & Nightmares	
2016	Short	Tech Support for the Apocalypse^{†}	F. J. Bergmann	Dreams & Nightmares	
2016	Short	An Introduction to Alternate Universes: Theory and Practice^{‡}	Sandra J. Lindow	Gyroscope Review	
2017	Long	Rose Child*	Theodora Goss	Uncanny	
2017	Long	The Rime of the Eldritch Mariner^{†}	Adam Bolivar	Spectral Realms	
2017	Long	Not Like This^{‡}	Mary Soon Lee	Apex Magazine	
2017	Short	George Tecumseh Sherman's Ghosts*	Marge Simon	Silver Blade	
2017	Short	Build a Rocketship Contest: Alternative Class A Instructions and Suggestions”)^{†}	Wendy Rathbone	Asimov's Science Fiction	
2017	Short	Godzilla Vs. King Kong^{‡}	James S. Dorr	Dreams & Nightmares	
2017	Short	Richard Feynman's Commute^{‡}	Jon Wesick	The Were-Traveler	
2017	Short	The Box of Dust and Monsters^{‡}	Beth Cato	Devilfish Review	
2018	Long	The Mushroom Hunters*	Neil Gaiman	Brain Pickings	
2018	Long	For Preserves^{†}	Cassandra Rose Clarke	Star*Line	
2018	Long	Alternate Genders^{‡}	Mary Soon Lee	Mithila Review	
2018	Short	Advice to a Six-Year-Old*	Mary Soon Lee	Star*Line	
2018	Short	Rivers^{†}	Sara Cleto	Mythic Delirium	
2018	Short	Gramarye^{‡}	F. J. Bergmann	Polu Texni	
2019	Long	Ursula Le Guin in the Underworld*	Sarah Tolmie	On Spec	
2019	Long	The Fairies in the Crawlspace^{†}	Beth Cato	Uncanny	
2019	Long	3-Minute Future^{‡}	F. J. Bergmann	Unlikely Stories V	
2019	Short	After Her Brother Ripped the Heads from Her Paper Dolls*	Beth Cato	Mythic Delirium	
2019	Short	What Loves You^{†}	Jeff Crandall	The Magazine of Fantasy & Science Fiction	
2019	Short	A City Built on Bones^{‡}	Ann K. Schwader	Abyss & Apex	
2019	Short	3D-Printed Brother^{‡}	Millie Ho	Strange Horizons	

=== 2020s ===
Year	Category	Poem	Author(s)	Publication	Ref.
2020	Long	"Heliobacterium daphnephilum"*	Rebecca Buchanan	Star*Line	
2020	Long	The Cinder Girl Burns Brightly^{†}	Theodora Goss	Uncanny	
2020	Long	The Macabre Modern^{‡}	Kyla Lee Ward	The Macabre Modern and Other Morbidities, P'rea Press	
2020	Long	Ode to the Artistic Temperament^{‡}	Michael H. Payne	Silver Blade	
2020	Short	Taking, Keeping*	Jessica J. Horowitz	Apparition Lit	
2020	Short	when my father reprograms my mother {^{†}	Caroline Mao	Strange Horizons	
2020	Short	Creation: Dark Matter Dating App^{‡}	Sandra J. Lindow	Asimov's Science Fiction	
2020	Short	The Day the Animals Turned to Sand^{‡}	Tyler Hagemann	Amazing Stories	
2021	Long	Eleven Exhibits in a Better Natural History Museum, London*	Jenny Blackford	Strange Horizons	
2021	Long	A Song from Bedlam (with apologies to Christopher Smart)^{†}	Nike Sulway	Liminality	
2021	Long	Devilish Incarnations^{‡}	Bruce Boston	Star*Line	
2021	Short	Summer Time(lessness)*	Linda D. Addison	Star*Line	
2021	Short	Why did white people conquer the world for spices and then never use them?^{†}	R. Thursday	Drunk Monkeys	
2021	Short	Darning^{‡}	Sandra J. Lindow	Asimov's Science Fiction	
2022	Long	The Bookstore*	Beth Cato	New Myths	
2022	Long	Reservation Fairy Tales 101—Final Exam^{†}	Marshella Rockwell	Augur Magazine	
2022	Long	Alexander's Babylon^{‡}	Marge Simon	Victims, Weasel Press	
2022	Long	Alexander's Babylon^{‡}	Mary Turzillo	Victims, Weasel Press	
2022	Long	The Captain Flies	Avi Silver	Uncanny Magazine	
2022	Long	Medusa Gets a Haircut	Theodora Goss	Uncanny Magazine	
2022	Short	Confessions of a Spaceport AI*	Mary Soon Lee	Uncanny Magazine	
2022	Short	Gravity (some things that fly)^{†}	Geoffrey A. Landis	Space and Time	
2022	Short	The Butterfly Affect^{‡}	Linda D. Addison	Were Tales: A Shapeshifter Anthology, Brigids Gate Press	
2022	Short	our translucent bodies	Devin Miller	Mermaids Monthly	
2022	Short	dry land	Maria Zocolla	Strange Horizons	
2022	Short	Exquisite	Lee Murray	Tortured Willows: Bent, Bowed, Unbroken, Yuriko Publishing	
2023	Long	Machine (r)Evolution*	Colleen Anderson	Radon Journal	
2023	Long	The Bone Tree^{†}	Rebecca Buchanan	Not a Princess, but (Yes) There was a Pea, and Other Fairy Tales to Foment Revolution, Jackanapes Press	
2023	Long	Igbo Landing II^{‡}	Akua Lezli Hope	Black Fire—This Time, Aquarius Press	
2023	Long	Herbaceous Citadel	Avra Margariti	The Fairy Tale Magazine	
2023	Long	Living in Rubble	Gerri Leen	Eccentric Orbits 3, Dimensionfold Publishing	
2023	Long	The Thing About Stars	Avra Margariti	Into the Forest: Tales of the Baba Yaga, Black Spot Books	
2023	Short	Harold and the Blood-Red Crayon*	Jennifer Crow	Star*Line	
2023	Short	In Stock Images of the Future, Everything is White*	Terese Mason Piere	Uncanny Magazine	
2023	Short	Bitch Moon^{†}	Sarah Grey	Nightmare Magazine	
2023	Short	First Contact^{‡}	Lisa Timpf	Eye to the Telescope	
2023	Short	The Gargoyle Watches the Rains End^{‡}	Amelia Gorman	The Gargoylicon: Imaginings and Images of the Gargoyle in Literature and Art, Mind's Eye Publications	
2023	Short	Field Notes from the Anthropocene	Priya Chand	Nightmare Magazine	
2023	Short	Near the end, your mother tells you she's been seeing someone	Shannon Connor Winward	SFPA Poetry Contest	
2023	Short	Dinner Plans with Baba Yaga	Stephanie M. Wytovich	Into the Forest: Tales of the Baba Yaga, Black Spot Books	
2024	Long	Little Brown Changeling*	Lauren Scharhag	Aphelion	
2024	Long	The Witch Makes Her To-Do List^{†}	Theodora Goss	Uncanny Magazine	
2024	Long	An Interrogation About A Monster During Sleep Paralysis^{‡}	Angela Liu	Strange Horizons	
2024	Long	Pilot	Akua Lezli Hope	Black Joy Unbound, BLF Press	
2024	Long	Cradling Fish	Laura Ma	Strange Horizons	
2024	Long	Archivist of a Lost World	Gerri Leen	Eccentric Orbits	
2024	Short	No One Now Remembers*	Geoffrey A. Landis	Fantasy and Science Fiction	
2024	Short	Language as a Form of Breath^{†}	Angel Leal	Apparition Lit	
2024	Short	The Day We All Died, A Little^{‡}	Lisa Timpf	Radon Journal	
2024	Short	Let Us Dream	Myna Chang	Small Wonders	
2024	Short	As Does the Crow	Beth Cato	Uncanny Magazine	
2024	Short	Mass-Market Affair	Casey Aimer	Star*Line	
2025	Long	The Blackthorn*	Mary Soon Lee	Dreams & Nightmares	
2025	Long	When it Really is Just the Wind, and Not a Furious Vexation^{†}	Kyle Tran Myrhe	Academy of American Poets Poem-a-Day	
2025	Long	The Museum of Etymology^{‡}	F.J. Bergmann	Star*Line	
2025	Long	The House of Mulberry Leaves	Ryu Ando	Crow & Cross Keys	
2025	Long	The Final Trick	Angela Liu	Strange Horizons	
2025	Long	Medicine For The Ailing Mortal, as Told in Seven Stories	Silvaticus Riddle	The Fairy Tale Magazine	
2025	Short	Lost Ark*	F.J. Bergmann	Space & Time Magazine	
2025	Short	A Black Hole is a Melting Pot That Will Make Us Whole^{†}	Pedro Iniguez	Star*Line	
2025	Short	The Witch Recalls Her Craft^{‡}	Angel Leal	Uncanny	
2025	Short	Things to Remember When Descending Through the Ocean	Sandra Kasturi	Stanza Poetry Competition	
2025	Short	Generation Ship	Akua Lezli Hope	Star*Line	
2025	Short	The Last Valkyrie	Pat Masson	Forgotten Ground Regained	
2026	Long	Hex Supply Customer Support Log*	Elis Montgomery	-	
2026	Long	His New Antlers^{†}	Rick Christiansen	-	
2026	Long	One Hundred Thousand Legends and the Longing Underneath^{‡}	Gwendolyn Hicks	-	
2026	Long	Components	PS Cottier	-	
2026	Long	A Priestess of Bast Reflects on a Past Life	Clarabelle Miray Fields	-	
2026	Long	Stationary	David C. Kopaska-Merkel	-	
2026	Short	How to become a sea witch*	Theodora Goss	-	
2026	Short	The Mourning Robot^{†}	Angela Liu	-	
2026	Short	Final Moments of a Witch: A Poem Told in Reverse ^{‡}	Pedro Iniguez	-	
2026	Short	Reaper	Mary Soon Lee	-	
2026	Short	I Try to Explain the Concept of Teeth to My Alien Roommate	Rachel Linton	-	
2026	Short	I Was Lt. Uhura	January Gill O’Neil	-	
