= Elgin Awards =

Annual science fiction poetry award

Elgin Award
- Awarded for: The best science fiction, fantasy, or horror poetry books published in English in the last two calendar years
- Presented by: Science Fiction & Fantasy Poetry Association
- First award: 2013
- Website: https://sfpoetry.org/wp/elgin-award/

The Elgin Award is an annual award presented by the Science Fiction & Fantasy Poetry Association to the author of the best horror, fantasy, or science fiction poetry Chapbooks (booklets of 10-39 pages) or books (40 pages or more). The award is named for Suzette Haden Elgin, founder of the SFPA. Works are eligible for two years after publication, those that place in the top three in their first year of eligibility are not eligible again in their second. Works must be published in English, though translated works are eligible.

Critic Holly Lyn Walrath has written that "Speculative poetry is a radical field right now ... reading from the Elgin nominee list is a fantastic starting place."

== Winners and nominees ==
In the following table, the years correspond to the date in which the award was given, rather than when the poem was first published. Each year links to the corresponding "year in poetry". Entries with a yellow background and an asterisk (*) next to the writer's name have won the award, while those with a gray background and a plus sign (+) took second place, and those with a white background took third.

* Winners
+ Second place
Third place

=== Books ===
'Books' are works with 40 or more pages of English language poetry.

Year	Author	Title	Publisher	Ref.
2013	Mary Turzillo*	Lovers & Killers	Dark Regions Press	
2013	Bruce Boston+	Notes From the Shadow City	Dark Regions Press	
2013	Gary William Crawford+	Notes From the Shadow City	Dark Regions Press	
2013	Sandra Kasturi	Come Late to the Love of Birds	Tightrope Books	
2014	Bryan Thao Worra*	Demonstra	Innsmouth Free Press	
2014	Jeannine Hall Gailey+	Unexplained Fevers	New Binary Press	
2014	Bruce Boston	Dark Roads	Dark Renaissance Books	
2015	Marge Simon*	Sweet Poison	Dark Renaissance	
2015	Mary Turzillo*	Sweet Poison	Dark Renaissance	
2015	Bruce Boston+	Dark Roads: Selected Long Poems 1971-2012	Dark Renaissance	
2015	Stephanie Wytovich	Mourning Jewelry	Raw Dog Screaming	
2016	Mary Soon Lee*	Crowned: The Sign Of The Dragon Book 1	Dark Renaissance	
2016	Jeannine Hall Gailey+	The Robot Scientist’s Daughter	Mayapple	
2016	Ann K. Schwader	Dark Energies	P’rea	
2017	Jeannine Hall Gailey*	Field Guide to the End of the World	Moon City	
2017	Jenna Le+	A History of the Cetacean American Diaspora	Anchor & Plume	
2017	Marge Simon+	Small Spirits: Dark Dolls	Midnight Town	
2017	Wendy Rathbone	Dead Starships	Eye Scry	
2018	Christina M. Rau*	Liberating the Astronauts	Aqueduct	
2018	Marge Simon+	Satan’s Sweethearts	Weasel	
2018	Mary Turzillo	Satan’s Sweethearts	Weasel	
2018	Margaret Rhee	Love Robot	The Operating System	
2019	Marge Simon*	War	Crystal Lake	
2019	Alessandro Manzetti*	War	Crystal Lake	
2019	Bruce Boston+	Artifacts	Independent Legions	
2019	Kiki Petrosino	Witch Wife	Sarabande	
2020	Franny Choi*	Soft Science	Alice James	
2020	Mary Soon Lee+	Elemental Haiku	Ten Speed	
2020	G.O. Clark	The Comfort of Screams	Alban Lake	
2020	Marge Simon	The Demeter Diaries	Independent Legions	
2020	Bryan D. Dietrich	The Demeter Diaries	Independent Legions	
2021	Mary Soon Lee*	The Sign of the Dragon	JABberwocky	
2021	Christina Sng+	A Collection of Dreamscapes	Raw Dog Screaming	
2021	Octavia Cade	Mary Shelley Makes a Monster	Aqueduct	
2021	LindaAnn Loschiavo	A Route Obscure and Lonely	Wapshott	
2022	Brandon O’Brien*	Can You Sign My Tentacle?	Interstellar Flight	
2022	Geneve Flynn+	Tortured Willows: Bent. Bowed. Unbroken	Yuriko	
2022	Lee Murray+	Tortured Willows: Bent. Bowed. Unbroken	Yuriko	
2022	Christina Sng+	Tortured Willows: Bent. Bowed. Unbroken	Yuriko	
2022	Angela Yuriko Smith+	Tortured Willows: Bent. Bowed. Unbroken	Yuriko	
2022	Ann K. Schwader	Unquiet Stars	Weird House	
2023	David C. Kopaska-Merkel*	Some Disassembly Required	Diminuendo	
2023	Avra Margariti+	The Saint of Witches	Weasel	
2023	Tiffany Morris	Elegies of Rotting Stars	Nictitating Books	
2023	Rebecca Buchanan	Not a Princess, But (Yes) There Was a Pea & Other Tales to Foment Revolution	Jackanapes	
2024	Christina Sng*	The Gravity of Existence	Interstellar Flight	
2024	Deborah L. Davitt+	Bounded By Eternity	self-published	
2024	Deborah L. Davitt	From Voyages Unreturning	Aqueduct	
2024	Jeannine Hall Gailey	Flare	BOA Editions	
2025	Pedro Iniguez*	Mexicans on the Moon	Space Cowboy	
2025	Miguel Mitchell+	Surrealia	Gnashing Teeth	
2025	Jamal Hodge	The Dark Between The Twilight	Aqueduct	
2026	Linda D. Addison*	Everything Endless	-	
2026	Jamal Hodge*	Everything Endless	-	
2026	Lee Murray+	Fox Spirit on a Distant Cloud	-	
2026	Herb Kauderer	Sleepless Nights in the Dreamers Mall	-	

=== Chapbooks ===
'Chapbooks' are works with between 10 and 39 pages of English language poetry.

Year	Author	Title	Publisher	Ref.
2013	F. J. Bergmann*	Out of the Black Forest	Centennial Press	
2013	Samantha Henderson+	The House of Forever: Selected Poems	Raven Electrick Ink	
2013	David C. Kopaska-Merkel	The Edible Zoo	Sam’s Dot Publishing	
2014	Helen Marshall	The Sex Lives of Monsters	Kelp Queen Press	
2014	David C. Kopaska-Merkel+	The Edible Zoo	Sam’s Dot Publishing	
2014	Joshua Gage	Inhuman: Haiku from the Zombie Apocalypse	The Poet’s Haven	
2015	Mary McMyne	Wolf Skin	Dancing Girl	
2015	David C. Kopaska-Merkel	Seti Hits Paydirt	Popcorn	
2015	David Clink	If the World Were to Stop Spinning	Piquant	
2016	Shannon Connor Winward	Undoing Winter	Finishing Line	
2016	John Philip Johnson	Stairs Appear in a Hole Outside of Town	Graphic Poetry	
2016	E. Kristin Anderson	A Guide for the Practical Abductee	Red Bird	
2017	Neil Aitken*	Leviathan	Hyacinth Girl	
2017	Margaret Rhee+	Radio Heart, or; How Robots Fall Out of Love	Finishing Line	
2017	John C. Mannone	Apocalypse	Alban Lake	
2018	F.J. Bergmann*	A Catalogue of the Further Suns	Gold Line	
2018	Christina Sng+	Astropoetry	Alban Lake	
2018	Dan Hoy	The Terraformers	Third Man	
2019	Holly Lyn Walrath*	Glimmerglass Girl	Finishing Line	
2019	G.O. Clark+	Built to Serve	Alban Lake	
2019	Laura Madeline Wiseman	Every Girl Becomes the Wolf	Finishing Line	
2019	Andrea Blythe	Every Girl Becomes the Wolf	Finishing Line	
2020	John Philip Johnson*	The Book of Fly	Graphic Poetry	
2020	Christina Olson+	The Last Mastodon	Rattle	
2020	Herb Kauderer	Fragments from the Book of the After-Dead	The Poet’s Haven	
2021	Akua Lezli Hope*	Otherwheres	ArtFarm	
2021	Andrea Blythe+	Twelve	Interstellar Flight	
2021	Terese Mason Pierre	Manifest	Gap Riot	
2022	Amelia Gorman*	Field Guide to Invasive Species of Minnesota	Interstellar Flight	
2022	Deborah P Kolodji+	Tug of a Black Hole	Title IX	
2022	John W. Sexton	Visions at Templeglantine	Revival	
2023	Jane Yolen*	The Last Robot and Other Science Fiction Poems	Shoreline of Infinity	
2023	Bruce Boston+	Spacers Snarled in the Hair of Comets	Mind’s Eye	
2023	Denise Dumars	Cajuns in Space	self-published	
2024	Amelia Gorman*	Worm Sonnets	Quarter	
2024	F.J. Bergmann+	Shelf Life	Space Cowboy	
2024	Holly Lyn Walrath	Numinous Stones	Aqueduct	
2025	Katherine Quevedo*	The Inca Weaver’s Tales	Sword & Kettle	
2025	Mahaila Smith+	Water-Kin	Metatron	
2025	Brian U. Garrison	Micropoetry for Microplanets	Space Cowboy	
2026	M. Frost*	The Women of Myth	-	
2026	Gerri Leen+	Over It: Goddesses Who’ve Reached Their Limit		
2026	David C. Kopaska-Merkel	Risk Assessment	-	
