= 2020 in poetry =

Major poetry related events taking place worldwide during 2020 are outlined below under different sections. This includes poetry books released during the year in different languages, major literary awards, poetry festivals and events, besides anniversaries and deaths of renowned poets etc. Nationality words link to articles with information on the nation's poetry or literature (for instance, India or France).

== Events ==
- January 27–February 1 – The National Cowboy Poetry Gathering is organised by Western Folklife Center in Nevada with live musical performances.

== Selection of works published in English ==
=== Australia ===
- Clive James, The Fire of Joy
- Ellen van Neerven, Throat

=== Canada ===
- J.R. Carpenter, This is a Picture of Wind

=== India ===
- Antony Theodore, I Am Your Baby, Mother
- Arvind Krishna Mehrotra, Selected Poems
- Ranjit Hoskote, Open Your Eyes
- Tapan Kumar Pradhan, Kalahandi - The Untold Story
- Tishani Doshi, Small Days and Nights

=== Nigeria ===
- Caleb Femi, Poor

=== United Kingdom ===
- Bhanu Kapil, How to Wash a Heart
- Caroline Bird, The Air Year
- Eavan Boland, The Historians
- Sean Hewitt, Tongues of Fire
- Simon Armitage, Magnetic Field: The Marsden Poems

=== United States ===
- Amanda Lovelace, Break Your Glass Slippers
- Claudia Rankine, Just Us
- Eliza Griswold, If Men, Then
- Lili Reinhart, Swimming Lessons
- Natalie Diaz, Postcolonial Love Poem
- Jill Osier, The Solace Is Not the Lullaby

=== United States ===
Alphabetical listing by author name

==== Anthologies in the United States ====
- Natalie Diaz, Postcolonial Love Poem
- Robert Hass, Summer Snow: New Poems

== Awards and honors by country ==
- See also: List of poetry awards

Awards announced this year:

=== International ===
- Struga Poetry Evenings Golden Wreath Laureate : Amir Or

=== Australia awards and honors ===
- Judith Wright Calanthe Award: П. O. for Heide
- Kenneth Slessor Prize for Poetry: Peter Boyle for Enfolded in the Wings of a Great Darkness
- Miles Franklin Award: Tara June Winch for The Yield
- Victorian Premier's Prize for Poetry: Charmaine Papertalk Green for Nganajungu Yagu

=== Canada awards and honors ===
- Archibald Lampman Award: Ben Ladouceur for Mad Long Emotion
- J. M. Abraham Poetry Award:
- Governor General's Awards:
- Griffin Poetry Prize : Kaie Kellough for Magnetic Equator
- Latner Writers' Trust Poetry Prize:
- Gerald Lampert Award:
- Pat Lowther Award:
- Prix Alain-Grandbois:
- Raymond Souster Award:
- Dorothy Livesay Poetry Prize:
- Prix Émile-Nelligan:

=== France awards and honors ===
- Prix Goncourt de la Poésie:

=== India awards and honors ===
- Sahitya Akademi Award : Arundhathi Subramaniam for When God is a Traveler (English) & Anamika for Tokri Mein Digant (Hindi)

=== New Zealand awards and honors ===
- Prime Minister's Awards for Literary Achievement:
  - Fiction: Tessa Duder
  - Nonfiction: Tīmoti Kāretu
  - Poetry: Jenny Bornholdt
- Mary and Peter Biggs Award for Poetry: Helen Rickerby for How to Live

=== United Kingdom awards and honors ===
- Cholmondeley Award: Bhanu Kapil
- Costa Award (formerly "Whitbread Awards") for poetry: Eavan Boland for The Historians
- English Association's Fellows' Poetry Prizes:
- Eric Gregory Award (for a collection of poems by a poet under the age of 30):
- Forward Poetry Prize:
  - Best Collection:
    - Shortlist:
  - Best First Collection:
    - Shortlist:
  - Best Poem:
    - Shortlist:
- Jerwood Aldeburgh First Collection Prize for poetry:
  - Shortlist:
- Manchester Poetry Prize: James Pollock
- National Poet of Wales:
- National Poetry Competition : Marvin Thompson for The Fruit of the Spirit is Love
- Queen's Gold Medal for Poetry:
- T. S. Eliot Prize : Bhanu Kapil for How to Wash a Heart

=== United States awards and honors ===
- Arab American Book Award (The George Ellenbogen Poetry Award):
  - Honorable Mentions:
- Agnes Lynch Starrett Poetry Prize:
- Anisfield-Wolf Book Award:
- Best Translated Book Award (BTBA):
- Beatrice Hawley Award from Alice James Books:
- Bollingen Prize:
- Dwarf Stars Award:John C. Mannone, "Standing Up"
- Elgin Awards:
  - Franny Choi, Soft Science (book)
  - John Philip Johnson, The Book of Fly (chapbook)
- Jackson Poetry Prize:
- Lambda Literary Award:
  - Gay Poetry:
  - Lesbian Poetry:
- Lenore Marshall Poetry Prize:
- Los Angeles Times Book Prize:
  - Finalists:
- National Book Award for Poetry (NBA):
  - NBA Finalists:
  - NBA Longlist:
  - NBA Judges:
- National Book Critics Circle Award for Poetry:
- The New Criterion Poetry Prize:
- Pulitzer Prize for Poetry (United States) : Jericho Brown for The Tradition
- Wallace Stevens Award:
- Whiting Awards:
- PEN Award for Poetry in Translation:
- PEN Center USA 2018 Poetry Award:
- PEN/Voelcker Award for Poetry: (Judges: )
- Raiziss/de Palchi Translation Award:
- Rhysling Award:
  - Rebecca Buchanan for "Heliobacterium daphnephilum" (long form)
  - Jessica J. Horowitz for Taking, Keeping
- Ruth Lilly Poetry Prize:
- Kingsley Tufts Poetry Award: Ariana Reines, A Sand Book
- Kate Tufts Discovery Award: Tiana Clark, I Can't Talk About the Trees Without the Blood
- Walt Whitman Prize – – Judge:
- Yale Younger Series: Desiree C. Bailey, What Noise Against the Cane (Judge: Carl Phillips)

==== From the Poetry Society of America ====
- Frost Medal:
- Shelley Memorial Award:
- Writer Magazine/Emily Dickinson Award:
- Lyric Poetry Award:
- Alice Fay Di Castagnola Award:
- Louise Louis/Emily F. Bourne Student Poetry Award:
- George Bogin Memorial Award:
- Robert H. Winner Memorial Award:
- Cecil Hemley Memorial Award:
- Norma Farber First Book Award:
- Lucille Medwick Memorial Award:
- William Carlos Williams Award:

== Deaths ==
Birth years link to the corresponding "[year] in poetry" article:

- February 4 – Kamau Brathwaite (b. 1930), Caribbean poet
- February 17 – Ror Wolf (b. 1932), German poet and writer
- February 18 – Seda Vermisheva (b. 1932), Armenian-Russian poet, economist and activist
- February 21 – Lisel Mueller (b. 1924), German-American poet and translator
- April 1 – Bruce Dawe (b. 1930), Australian poet
- April 19 - Duane Ackerson (b. 1942), American writer of speculative poetry and fiction.
- April 27 – Eavan Boland (b. 1944), Irish poet and author
- May 4 – Michael McClure (b. 1932), American poet, playwright and songwriter
- June 12 – Anand Mohan Zutshi Gulzar Dehlvi (b. 1926), Indian Urdu poet
- July 31 – ruth weiss (b. 1928), German-born American poet of the Beat Generation
- August 11 – Rahat Indori (b. 1950), Indian Urdu poet and Bollywood lyricist, following COVID-19 infection
- September 14 – Anne Stevenson (b. 1933), American-British poet
- October 1 – Derek Mahon, (b. 1941), Irish poet
- October 25 – Diane Di Prima (b. 1934), American poet of the Beat Generation
- November 10 – Carlo Bordini (b. 1938), Italian poet
- December 14 – Marvin Bell (b. 1937), American poet
- December 23 – Sugathakumari (b. 1934), Indian Malayalam poet and activist

== See also ==
- Poetry
- List of years in poetry
- List of poetry awards
