= Mexicans on the Moon =

2024 book of poetry by Pedro Iniguez

Mexicans on the Moon: Speculative Poetry from a Possible Future
- Cover (first edition, 2024)
- Author: Pedro Iniguez
- Cover artist: Dante Luiz
- Genre: Speculative poetry
- Publisher: Space Cowboy Books
- Publication date: 3 September 2024
- Publication place: Joshua Tree, California
- Pages: 90
- ISBN: 979-8-9896308-0-6
- Website: pedroiniguez.com

Mexicans on the Moon: Speculative Poetry from a Possible Future is a collection of speculative poetry by Mexican-American writer Pedro Iniguez. His debut poetry collection, it was published by Space Cowboy Books in the United States on 3 September 2024.

== Contents ==
The book's poems, narrated through a Mexican-American lens, cover such topics as the exploration of space, time travel, racism, immigration, and public school shootings. According to the author, one of the issues he sought to address through his verse was Latinos and their place amongst humanity in the future and among the stars: "Science-Fiction has not been kind to Latinos. Not in books, not in movies. Growing up, I never saw many of them represented on screen or in the fiction I read. I didn't see them making it to the future. I wanted to correct that."

Iniguez dedicated the book to his father for introducing him to the world of science fiction in spite of his initial failure to encourage his third-grade son's poetic efforts. Horror writer Gabino Iglesias supplied an introduction.

The 50 poems in Mexicans on the Moon are divided into four sections:

- "Earth" deals with life on Earth.
- "Frontiers" explores possibilities in humankind's search for a home in outer space.
- "Futures" offers perspectives on the destruction of Earth and the loss of humanity.
- "Aftermath" contains poems about the victims and survivors of a future apocalypse.

Included among the collected poems are "Perish and Live Forever", which won the 2025 Dwarf Stars Award, and "A Black Hole is a Melting Pot That Will Make Us Whole", which was placed second for the 2025 Rhysling Award.

== Reception ==
Mexicans on the Moon won the Horror Writers Association's Bram Stoker Award for Best Poetry Collection in 2024 and the Science Fiction & Fantasy Poetry Association's Elgin Award (book category) in 2025.

== See also ==
- Latino poetry
- Latino Futurism
