= Eye to the Telescope (magazine) =

Journal of the Science Fiction Poetry Association

Eye to the Telescope is a quarterly online journal of the Science Fiction & Fantasy Poetry Association, which publishes speculative poetry, including science-fiction, fantasy, horror, and poetry. It was established in 2011.

It is a theme-based periodical with rotating editors. The first issue, in May 2011, had the theme "The Long and Short of Speculative Poetry," and featured both short poems, including haiku, tanka, and other short poems, contrasted with long poems. It was edited by Samantha Henderson and Deborah P Kolodji. Since then the journal's editors are selected by the current SFPA president and change with each issue; as a result, editorial policies change with each issue as well.

== Issues and themes ==
Issues, themes, and editors:

1. Long & Short: Samantha Henderson and Deborah P. Kolodji (May 2011)
2. Australia & New Zealand: Tim Jones (August 2011)
3. Persona: Jeannine Hall Gailey (January 2012)
4. Formalism: Lester Smith (April 2012)
5. LGBTQ: Stephen M. Wilson (July 2012)
6. Weird Verse: Wade German (October 2012)
7. Asian American: Bryan Thao Worra (January 2013)
8. Immigrations: Joanne Merriam (April 2013)
9. Bodies: Cathrynne Valente (July 2013)
10. Translations: Lawrence Schimel (October 2013)
11. Juxtapositions: Joshua Gage (January 2014)
12. Mundane: Roger Dutcher (April 2014)
13. Science: Geoffrey A. Landis (July 2014)
14. Ekphrastic: John C. Mannone (October 2014)
15. Women: Anastasia Andersen (January 2015)
16. Music: Diane Severson (April 2015)
17. Isolation: Stephanie M. Wytovich (July 2015)
18. Race: Jason McCall (October 2015)
19. Mythopoesis: Curtis Shumaker (January 2016)
20. Family: Josh Brown (April 2016)
21. Male Perspectives: Marge Simon (July 2016)
22. Ghosts: Shannon Connor Winward (October 2016)
23. Robots: Brian U. Garrison (January 2017)
24. Alternate Stories (alternate realities, histories, futures, etc.): Alan Ira Gordon (April 2017)
25. Garbage: John Reinhart (July 2017)
26. Evolving Gender: Sandra J. Lindow (October 2017)
27. Arthuriana: Adele Gardner (January 2018)
28. Time: Holly Lyn Walrath (April 2018)
29. The Dark: Colleen Anderson (July 2018)
30. Witches: Ashley Dioses (October 2018)
31. Crossroads: Heather Moser (January 2019)
32. Sports & Games: Lisa Timpf (April 2019)
33. Infection: Sara Tantlinger (July 2019)
34. Tricksters: Brittany Hause (October 2019)
35. Hard Science Fiction Tropes: David C. Kopaska-Merkel (January 2020)
36. House & Home: Emma J. Gibbon (April 2020)
37. The Sex Issue: Jake Tringali (July 2020)
38. Cat People: John Philip Johnson (October 2020)
39. Travel: Alicia Cole (January 2021)
40. Weird West: Gary Every (April 2021)
41. Indigenous Futurisms: Tiffany Morris (July 2021)
42. The Sea: Akua Lezli Hope (October 2021)
43. Light: Jordan Hirsch (January 2022)
44. Notional Ekphrasis: F. J. Bergmann (April 2022)
45. Veterans of Future Wars: Deborah L. Davitt (July 2022)
46. Quests: Wendy Van Camp (October 2022)
47. Frankenstein: R. Thursday (January 2023)
48. Fungi: Avra Margariti (April 2023)
49. Trauma: Tony Daly (July 2023)
50. Food & Feasting: Claire McNerney (October 2023)
51. Death: Robin Wyatt Dunn (January 2024)
52. Dragons: SFPA Staff (April 2024)
53. Strange Mixology: Gretchen Tessmer (July 2024)
54. Outlaws: Melissa Ridley Elmes (October 2024)
55. (Non)Binaries: Haley Bossé (January 2025)
56. Plants: Eva Papasoulioti (April 2025)
57. Birds: Maria Schrater (July 2025)
58. Cyberpunk: Casey Aimer (October 2025)
59. Immortality: C. C. Rayne (February 2026)

== Reviews ==
Diane Severson, Amazing Stories Magazine
