= 2018 in poetry =

Major poetry-related events that took place worldwide during 2018 are outlined below, in various different sections. This includes poetry books released during the year in different languages, major literary awards, poetry festivals and events, besides anniversaries and deaths of renowned poets, etc. Nationality words link to articles with information on the nation's poetry or literature (for instance, India or France).

== Events ==
- August 11 – Writer V. S. Naipaul, on his deathbed in London, is read Tennyson's poem "Crossing the Bar" by newspaper editor Geordie Greig.

== Selection of works published in English ==
=== Australia ===
- Jordie Albiston, Warlines
- Judith Beveridge, Sun Music: New and Selected Poems
- Ken Bolton, Starting at Basheer's
- Sarah Day, Towards Light & Other Poems
- Paul Hetherington, Moonlight on Oleander
- John Mateer, João
- Tim Metcalf, The Underwritten Plain
- Tracy Ryan, The Water Bearer

==== Anthologies in Australia ====
- Brook Emery, Naming the Particulars, Parramatta, NSW: Youngstreet Poets. ISBN 978-1-6446-7538-0

=== Canada ===
- Gwen Benaway, Holy Wild
- Leonard Cohen (d. 2016), The Flame

=== Ireland ===
- John Kelly, Notions

=== United Kingdom ===
==== England ====
- Raymond Antrobus, The Perseverance
- Jay Bernard, Surge
- John Cooper Clarke, The Luckiest Guy Alive
- Salena Godden, Pessimism is for Lightweights: 13 pieces of courage and resistance
- Susannah Hart, Out of True
- Zaffar Kunial, Us
- Andrew McMillan, playtime
- J. O. Morgan, Assurances (Scottish poet published in England)
- Robin Robertson, The Long Take (novel partly in verse; Scottish poet published in England)
- Richard Scott, Soho
- Hannah Sullivan, Three Poems

==== Anthologies in the United Kingdom ====
- Fiona Waters, I am the Seed that Grew the Tree: A Nature Poem for Every Day of the Year

=== United States ===
Alphabetical listing by author name

- Elizabeth Acevedo, The Poet X (young adult verse novel)
- Ace Allen, Poems of People
- Jos Charles, feeld (Milkweed Editions)
- Duy Doan, We Play a Game (Yale University Press)
- Jason Reynolds, For Every One

== Works published in other languages ==
=== Italian ===
- AA.VV., Paragrafi. Antologia di poesia in prosa (edited by Pietro Montorfani, Coll. Candide, Pasturana, puntoacapo editrice), poets: Antonella Anedda, Marta Arnaldi, Daniela Attanasio, Alberto Bertoni, Franco Buffoni, Pietro De Marchi, Luigi Fontanella, Marco Furia, Vito Giuliana, Andrea Inglese, Gilberto Isella, Fabio Jermini, Marica Larocchi, Franca Mancinelli, Massimiliano Mandorlo, Matteo Munaretto, Giampiero Neri, Alberto Nessi, Enzo Pelli, Giancarlo Pontiggia, Fabio Pusterla, Jacopo Ramonda, Roberto Rossi Precerutti, Marco Sonzogni, Andrea Temporelli, Marco Vitale
- AA.VV., Non era soltanto passione. Generazione degli anni 80 (edited by Andrea Bianchetti, preface by Debora Giampani, Viganello [Lugano], alla chiara fonte); poets: Noé Albergati, Daniele Bernardi, Yari Bernasconi, Andrea Bianchetti, Margherita Coldesina, Laura Di Corcia, Lia Galli, Andrea Grassi, Fabio Jermini, Jonathan Lupi, Mercure Martini, Marko Miladinovic, Pietro Montorfani, Carlotta Silini
- Linda Baranzini, Solo vorrei ammirare lungamente (Viganello [Lugano], alla chiara fonte)

== Awards and honors by country ==
- See also: List of poetry awards

Awards announced this year:

=== International ===
- Struga Poetry Evenings Golden Wreath Laureate:

=== Australia awards and honors ===
- C. J. Dennis Prize for Poetry:
- Kenneth Slessor Prize for Poetry:

=== Canada awards and honors ===
- Archibald Lampman Award: Christine McNair, Charm
- J. M. Abraham Poetry Award: Julia McCarthy, All the Names Between
- Governor General's Awards: Cecily Nicholson, Wayside Sang (English); Michaël Trahan, La raison des fleurs (French)
- Griffin Poetry Prize:
  - Canada: Billy-Ray Belcourt, This Wound Is a World
  - International: Susan Howe, Debths
  - Lifetime Recognition Award (presented by the Griffin trustees): Ana Blandiana
- Latner Writers' Trust Poetry Prize: Jordan Scott
- Gerald Lampert Award: Emily Nilsen, Otolith
- Pat Lowther Award: Lesley Belleau, Indianland
- Prix Alain-Grandbois: Catherine Lalonde, La dévoration des fées
- Raymond Souster Award: Karen Enns, Cloud Physics
- Dorothy Livesay Poetry Prize: Mercedes Eng, Prison Industrial Complex Explodes
- Prix Émile-Nelligan:

=== France awards and honors ===
- Prix Goncourt de la Poésie:

=== New Zealand awards and honors ===
- Prime Minister's Awards for Literary Achievement:
  - Fiction:
  - Nonfiction:
  - Poetry:
- Mary and Peter Biggs Award for Poetry : Elizabeth Smither, Night Horse

=== United Kingdom awards and honors ===
- Cholmondeley Award: Vahni Capildeo, Kate Clanchy, Linton Kwesi Johnson, Daljit Nagra, Zoë Skoulding
- Costa Award (formerly "Whitbread Awards") for poetry:
  - Shortlist: Zaffar Kunial, Us; J. O. Morgan, Assurances; Richard Scott, Soho; Hannah Sullivan, Three Poems
- English Association's Fellows' Poetry Prizes:
- Eric Gregory Award (for a collection of poems by a poet under the age of 30):
- Forward Poetry Prize:
  - Best Collection:
    - Shortlist:
  - Best First Collection:
    - Shortlist:
  - Best Poem:
    - Shortlist:
- Jerwood Aldeburgh First Collection Prize for poetry:
  - Shortlist:
- Manchester Poetry Prize:
- National Poet of Wales: Ifor ap Glyn
- National Poetry Competition 2018:
- Queen's Gold Medal for Poetry: Simon Armitage
- T. S. Eliot Prize (United Kingdom and Ireland): Hannah Sullivan, Three Poems
  - Shortlist (announced in November 2018): 2018 Short List
- The Times / Stephen Spender Prize for Poetry Translation:

=== United States awards and honors ===
- Arab American Book Award (The George Ellenbogen Poetry Award):
  - Honorable Mentions:
- Agnes Lynch Starrett Poetry Prize:
- Anisfield-Wolf Book Award:
- Best Translated Book Award (BTBA):
- Beatrice Hawley Award from Alice James Books:
- Bollingen Prize:
- Dwarf Stars Award: Kath Abela Wilson for "The Green"
- Elgin Awards:
  - Christina M. Rau for Liberating the Astronauts (Book)
  - F.J. Bergmann for A Catalogue of the Further Suns (Chapbook)
- Jackson Poetry Prize:
- Lambda Literary Award:
  - Gay Poetry:
  - Lesbian Poetry:
- Lenore Marshall Poetry Prize: Craig Morgan Teicher
- Los Angeles Times Book Prize:
  - Finalists:
- National Book Award for Poetry (NBA):
  - NBA Finalists:
  - NBA Longlist:
  - NBA Judges:
- National Book Critics Circle Award for Poetry:
- The New Criterion Poetry Prize:
- Pulitzer Prize for Poetry (United States):
- Rhysling Awards:
  - Neil Gaiman for The Mushroom Hunters (Long)
  - Mary Soon Lee, for Advice to a Six-Year-Old (Short)
- Wallace Stevens Award:
- Whiting Awards:
- PEN Award for Poetry in Translation:
- PEN Center USA 2018 Poetry Award:
- PEN/Voelcker Award for Poetry: (Judges: )
- Raiziss/de Palchi Translation Award:
- Ruth Lilly Poetry Prize:
- Kingsley Tufts Poetry Award: Patricia Smith for Incendiary Art
- Kate Tufts Discovery Award: Donika Kelly for Bestiary
- Walt Whitman Prize – – Judge:
- Yale Younger Series: Yanyi for The Year of Blue Water (Judge: Carl Phillips)

==== From the Poetry Society of America ====
- Frost Medal: Ron Padgett
- Shelley Memorial Award: Ntozake Shange
- Writer Magazine/Emily Dickinson Award:
- Lyric Poetry Award:
- Alice Fay Di Castagnola Award: Victoria Chang
- Louise Louis/Emily F. Bourne Student Poetry Award:
- George Bogin Memorial Award:
- Robert H. Winner Memorial Award:
- Cecil Hemley Memorial Award:
- Norma Farber First Book Award: Eve L. Ewing
- Lucille Medwick Memorial Award:
- William Carlos Williams Award: Jennifer Chang

== Deaths ==
=== January – June ===
Birth years link to the corresponding "[year] in poetry" article:

- January 3 – Keorapetse Kgositsile (b. 1938), South African Poet Laureate
- February 12 – Kamal al-Hadithi (b. 1939), Iraqi poet
- January 18 – Ursula K. Le Guin (b. 1929), American novelist and poet.

=== July – December ===
- August 5 – Matthew Sweeney (b. 1952), Irish poet
- October 22 – Anne Fairbairn, (b. 1928), Australian poet, journalist and expert in Arab culture
- October 27 – Ntozake Shange (b. 1948), American playwright and poet
- November 22 – Judith Rodriguez, (b. 1936), Australian poet and academic

== See also ==
- Poetry
- List of years in poetry
- List of poetry awards
