= Mike Allen (poet) =

American news reporter and columnist (born 1969)

Mike Louis Allen
- Born: February 1, 1969 (age 57); Minneapolis, Minnesota, U.S.
- Occupations: Editor; Author; Poet; Publisher
- Writing career
- Genres: Speculative fiction Speculative poetry
- Website: descentintolight.com

Mike Louis Allen (born February 1, 1969) is an American news reporter and columnist, as well as an editor and writer of speculative fiction and speculative poetry.

== Early life and education ==
Michael Louis Allen was born on February 1, 1969, in Minneapolis, Minnesota, to academic parents. During his childhood the family relocated frequently for teaching positions, living for a time in Guam, Chicago, and Wise, Virginia before settling in Roanoke, Virginia. He earned a liberal arts degree from Virginia Tech and later completed a master's degree in creative writing at Hollins University. After working for four years in retail, Allen joined the Roanoke Times, where he covered a range of topics before being appointed arts columnist in 2009

== Literary career ==
The Philadelphia Inquirer has described Allen as being "[a]mong the better-known practitioners of speculative poetry" and said his poems "work best when his bizarre lyricism is put in the service of a scary and taut narrative."

He served as president of the Science Fiction Poetry Association from 2004 to 2006. He created the small press poetry journal Mythic Delirium in 1998.

Published biannually, the journal has included poems by authors such as Suzette Haden Elgin, Neil Gaiman, Theodora Goss, Joe Haldeman, Ursula K. Le Guin, Darrell Schweitzer, Sonya Taaffe, Catherynne M. Valente, Ian Watson, and Jane Yolen. In 2013, Allen used the crowdfunding website Kickstarter to convert Mythic Delirium into a quarterly digital journal that publishes fiction and poetry. Allen closed the journal in 2018 after publishing 20 digital issues and 50 issues overall. For his work on Mythic Delirium, Allen was nominated for a World Fantasy Award in 2019.

Allen also used Kickstarter to continue publishing Clockwork Phoenix, a fantasy fiction anthology series he began editing in 2008.

Strange Horizons called the first crowdfunded volume, Clockwork Phoenix 4, a look into "the future of publishing, in which a crowd-sourced publication from a very small press can produce, and can present professionally and beautifully, work which is at the height of what is being written in genre."

== Personal life ==
Allen is married to Anita Allen, with whom he runs Mythic Delirium Books. In his day job, he is a news reporter and arts and culture columnist for a daily newspaper in Roanoke, Virginia, where he currently lives.

== Recognition ==
Allen's short story "The Button Bin" was a finalist for the 2008 Nebula Award for Best Short Story. In 2015, his debut short story collection Unseaming was a finalist for the Shirley Jackson Award for best single author collection. In 2017, an anthology he edited, Clockwork Phoenix 5, was a finalist for the World Fantasy Award—Anthology. In 2021, Allen received a second Shirley Jackson Award nomination for his 2020 collection Aftermath of an Industrial Accident: Stories.

Allen has won the Rhysling Award for best speculative poem three times, in 2003, 2006, and 2007.

- "Epochs in Exile: A Fantasy Trilogy" (co-authored with Charles M. Saplak), Rhysling Award, Best Long Poem, 2003 (winner)
- "The Strip Search," Rhysling Award, Best Short Poem, 2006 (winner)
- "The Journey to Kailash," Rhysling Award, Best Long Poem, 2007 (winner)
- "The Button Bin," Nebula Award, Best Short Story, 2008 (nominee)
- Unseaming, Shirley Jackson Award, Best Collection, 2014 (nominee)
- Clockwork Phoenix 5, World Fantasy Award, Best Anthology, 2017 (nominee)
- World Fantasy Award, Special Award—Non-professional, for Mythic Delirium, 2019 (nominee)
- Aftermath of an Industrial Accident: Stories, Shirley Jackson Award, Best Collection, 2020 (nominee)

== Bibliography ==
=== Short story collections ===
- Unseaming (Antimatter Press, 2014)
- The Spider Tapestries: Seven Strange Stories (Mythic Delirium Books, 2016)
- Aftermath of an Industrial Accident: Stories (Mythic Delirium Books, 2020)

=== Poetry collections ===
- Disturbing Muses (Prime Books, 2005)
- Strange Wisdoms of the Dead (Wildside Press, 2006)
- The Journey to Kailash (Norilana Books, 2008)
- Hungry Constellations (Mythic Delirium Books, 2014)

=== As editor ===
- The Alchemy of Stars: Rhysling Award Winners Showcase (with Roger Dutcher, Science Fiction Poetry Association, 2005)
- Mythic (Mythic Delirium Books, 2006)
- Mythic 2 (Mythic Delirium Books, 2006)
- Clockwork Phoenix: Tales of Beauty and Strangeness (Norilana Books, 2008)
- Clockwork Phoenix 2: More Tales of Beauty and Strangeness (Norilana Books, 2009)
- Clockwork Phoenix 3: New Tales of Beauty and Strangeness (Norilana Books, 2010)
- Clockwork Phoenix 4 (Mythic Delirium Books, 2013)
- Mythic Delirium (with Anita Allen, Mythic Delirium Books, 2014)
- Mythic Delirium: Volume Two (with Anita Allen, Mythic Delirium Books, 2015)
- Clockwork Phoenix 5 (Mythic Delirium Books, 2016)
