= 2023 in poetry =

This is a list of poetry events and publications in 2023.

== Events ==
- April 20-22 — The Queensland Poetry Festival occurs at the State Library of Queensland in Brisbane, Australia. Its theme is "Story/Verse".
- May 5-7 — The Massachusetts Poetry Festival occurs in Salem, Massachusetts, U.S., with over 150 poets attending.
- May 16-20 — The Cork International Poetry Festival, organized by the Munster Literature Centre, is held in Cork, Ireland.
- June 9-11 — The Poetry International is held in Rotterdam, the Netherlands.
- August 5 — The Bengaluru Poetry Festival is held in Bengaluru, Karnataka, India.
- September 27-October 1 — The Druskininkai Poetic Fall is held in Lithuania in the cities of Druskininkai and Vilnius and was attended by about 120 people.

== Selection of works published in English ==
=== Ukraine ===
- Zhadan, Serhiy (October 3, 2023). How Fire Descends: New and Selected Poems. Translated by Tkacz, Virlana; Wanda, Phipps. Yale University Press. ISBN 9780300272468. Discusses the Russo-Ukrainian War.

=== United States ===
- Graham, Jorie (April 25, 2023). To 2040. Copper Canyon Press. ISBN 9781556596773.
- Hacker, Marilyn (April 4, 2023). Calligraphies: Poems. Norton. ISBN 9781324036463. Discusses life in Beirut, Paris, and Montpeyroux.
- Lerner, Ben (September 5, 2023). The Lights. Farrar, Straus, and Giroux. ISBN 9780374721206.
- Nicholson, Sara (2023). April. SongCave. ISBN 9781737277590.
- Shimoda, Brandon (June 27, 2023). Hydra Medusa. Nightboat Books. ISBN 9781643621715.
- Schiff, Robyn (August 15, 2023). Information Desk: An Epic. Penguin Publishing Group. ISBN 9780525508311.

== Awards and honors by country ==
=== United States awards and honors ===
- Arab American Book Award (The George Ellenbogen Poetry Award):
  - Honorable Mentions:
- Agnes Lynch Starrett Poetry Prize:
- Anisfield-Wolf Book Award:
- Beatrice Hawley Award from Alice James Books:
- Bollingen Prize
- Dwarf Stars Award
  - Rasha Abdulhadi for "Believe the Graves" (tie)
  - Bruce Boston, "In Perpetuity" (tie)
- Elgin Awards
  - David C. Kopaska-Merkel for Some Disassembly Required (book)
  - Jane Yolen for The Last Robot and Other Science Fiction Poems (chapbook)
- Jackson Poetry Prize:
  - Gay Poetry:
  - Lesbian Poetry:
- Lenore Marshall Poetry Prize:
- Los Angeles Times Book Prize:
- National Book Award for Poetry (NBA):
- National Book Critics Circle Award for Poetry:
- The New Criterion Poetry Prize:
- Pulitzer Prize for Poetry:
- Wallace Stevens Award:
- Whiting Awards:
- PEN Award for Poetry in Translation:
- PEN Center USA 2021 Poetry Award:
- PEN/Voelcker Award for Poetry: (Judges: )
- Raiziss/de Palchi Translation Award:
- Rhysling Award
  - Priya Chand for “Field Notes from the Anthropocene” (Long form)
  - Jennifer Crow for “Harold and the Blood-Red Crayon”
- Ruth Lilly Poetry Prize:
- Kingsley Tufts Poetry Award: Roger Reeves, Best Barbarian
- Kate Tufts Discovery Award: Robert Wood Lynn, Mothman Apologia
- Walt Whitman Prize – – Judge:
- Yale Younger Series: Cindy Juyoung Ok, Ward Toward (Judge: Rae Armantrout)

== Deaths ==
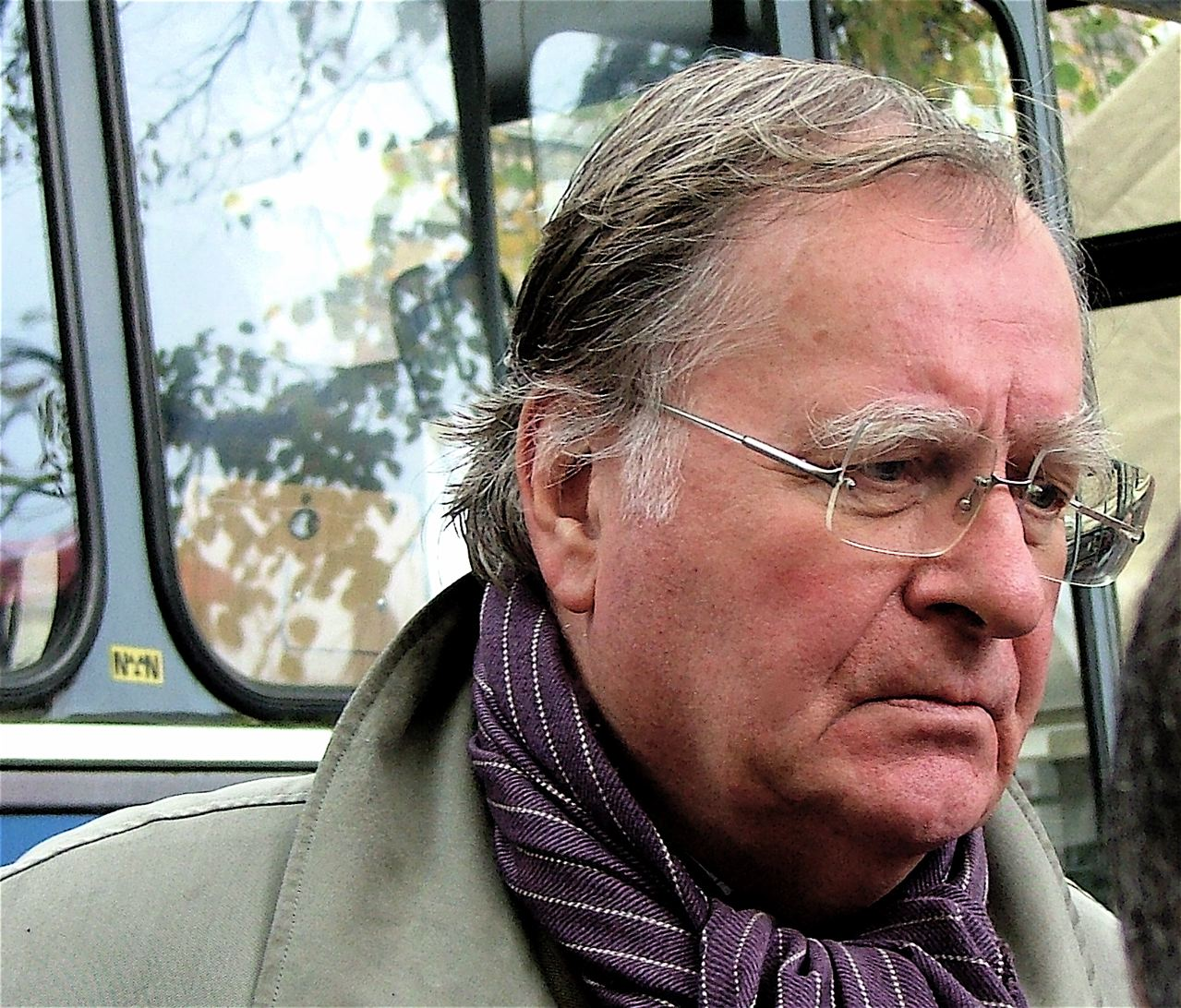
Huub Oosterhuis in 2006

- January 2 — Dumitru Radu Popescu (b. 1935), Romanian poet
- January 7 —Henri Heurtebise (b. 1936), French poet and editor
- ??? — Richard Kell (b. 1927), Irish poet, composer, teacher, and reviewer
- March 10 —David Bottoms (b. 1949), American poet
- April — R. H. W. Dillard (b. 1937), American poet, critic, and writing professor
- April 9 — Huub Oosterhuis (b. 1933), Dutch theologian and poet
- April 21 — John Tranter (b. 1943), Australian poet, publisher and editor
- May 19 — Pete Brown (b. 1940), American poet and songwriter
- May 22 — Andrew Burke (b. 1944), Australian poet
- June 7 —Saskia Hamilton (b. 1967), American poet, professor, and vice provost
- June 30 — Ron Pretty (b. 1940), Australian poet
- July 7 —Ahmed Ilias (b. 1934), Bangladeshi poet
- August 11 — Kenneth White (b. 1936), Scottish poet
- November 13 - Michael Bishop, (b. 1945), American author and poet.
- November 18 — Nan Witcomb (b. 1927/1928, Australian poet and radio broadcaster
- December 28 — Abubakar Siddique (b. 1934), Pakistani poet and professor

== See also ==
- Poetry
- List of years in poetry
- List of poetry awards
