= Dwarf Stars Award =

Annual science fiction poetry award

- Awarded for: The best science fiction, fantasy, or horror poem of ten lines or fewer published in English in the prior calendar year
- Presented by: Science Fiction & Fantasy Poetry Association
- First award: 2006
- Currently held by: Robert Frazier ("Concrete Cuneiform Poem #1")
- Website: www.sfpoetry.com/dwarfstars.html

The Dwarf Stars Award is an annual award presented by the Science Fiction & Fantasy Poetry Association to the author of the best horror, fantasy, or science fiction poem of ten lines or fewer published in the previous year. The award was established in 2006 as a counterpoint to the Rhysling Award, which is given by the same organization to horror, fantasy, or science fiction poems of any length. Poems are submitted to the association by the poets, from which approximately 30 are chosen by an editor to be published in an anthology each fall. Members of the association then vote on the published poems, and first through third-place winners are announced. The 2006 anthology was edited by Deborah P. Kolodji, and subsequent anthologies have been edited by an array of editors, including Kolodji, Stephen M. Wilson, Joshua Gage, Geoffrey A. Landis, Linda D. Addison, Sandra J. Lindow, John Amen, Jeannine Hall Gailey, and Lesley Wheeler.

During the 19 nomination years, 66 poems by 49 poets have been selected as third place or better, of which 22 poets have won outright. This includes two-way ties for first place in 2022 and 2023, a three-way tie for second in 2016, a two-way tie for third place in 2018, and a three-way tie for third in 2023. Jane Yolen has been noted four times, a first and a third place and two second-place results; Kolodji, Julie Bloss Kelsey and LeRoy Gorman have each received a first and a second place; Greg Beatty a first and a third place; Sonya Taaffe has received two second-place results; Sandi Leibowitz and F. J. Bergmann have each received a second and a third-place result; and Ann K. Schwader and Sandra J. Lindow have each received two third-place results.

== Winners and nominees ==
In the following table, the years correspond to the date in which the award was given, rather than when the poem was first published. Each year links to the corresponding "year in poetry". Entries with a blue background and an asterisk (*) next to the writer's name have won the award, while those with a gray background and a plus sign (+) took second place, and those with a white background took third.

* Winners
+ Second place
Third place

Year	Author	Poem	Publication	Ref.
2006	Ruth Berman*	"Knowledge Of"	Kerem	
2006	Peg Duthie+	"The Stepsister"	The Magazine of Speculative Poetry	
2006	Greg Beatty	"Prayer Causes Stars"	Abyss & Apex	
2007	Jane Yolen*	"Last Unicorn"	Asimov's Science Fiction	
2007	Jane Yolen+	"Troll Under Bridge"	Asimov's Science Fiction	
2007	Sandra J. Lindow	"Dwarves"	The Magazine of Speculative Poetry	
2008	Greg Beatty*	"Place Mat by Moebius"	Asimov's Science Fiction	
2008	Sonya Taaffe+	"Muse"	Strange Horizons	
2008	Ann K. Schwader	"Dancing to Van Gogh"	Mythic Delirium	
2009	Geoffrey A. Landis*	"Fireflies"	Asimov's Science Fiction	
2009	Elizabeth Barrette+	"the leaf whisperer"	Doorways Magazine	
2009	Jane Yolen	"Goodbye Billy Goat Gruff"	Asimov's Science Fiction	
2010	Howard V. Hendrix*	"Bumbershoot"	Abyss & Apex	
2010	Deborah P. Kolodji+	"The Selkie's Children"	Goblin Fruit	
2010	Stephen Wilson	"The Men All Pause"	Poet's Espresso	
2011	Julie Bloss Kelsey*	"Comet"	microcosms	
2011	Sonya Taaffe+	"Tapping the Vine"	Goblin Fruit	
2011	Ann K. Schwader	"Returning"	Star*Line	
2012	Marge Simon*	"Blue Rose Buddha"	The Mad Hattery	
2012	Greer Woodward+	"Closure"	Illumen	
2012	G. O. Clark	"Snowflake galaxies"	microcosms	
2013	Deborah P. Kolodji*	"Basho After Cinderella (iii)"	Rattle	
2013	Mary Turzillo+	"The Hidden"	Lovers & Killers	
2013	N. E. Taylor	"Sarcophagus"	inkscrawl	
2014	Mat Joiner*	"And Deeper than Did Ever Plummet Sound"	Strange Horizons	
2014	Mari Ness+	"The Loss"	Strange Horizons	
2014	David Livingstone Clink	"Hourglass"	Prism International	
2015	Greg Schwartz*	"abandoned nursing home"	Tales of the Talisman	
2015	Jane Yolen+	"Princess: A Life"	Mythic Delirium	
2015	Robert Borski	"The Square Root of Doppelgängers"	Star*Line	
2016	Stacy Balkun*	"We Begin This Way"	Gingerbread House	
2016	Julie Bloss Kelsey+	"at the barre"	Rattle	
2016	F. J. Bergmann+	"The Doorman"	Grievous Angel	
2016	Sandi Leibowitz+	"Weathering"	Silver Blade	
2016	John C. Mannone	"Alice was chasing white rabbits out of a black hole"	Abbreviate Journal	
2017	LeRoy Gorman*	"aster than the speed of lightf"	Scifaikuest	
2017	Holly Day+	"Lover"	Homestead Review	
2017	Sandi Leibowitz	"Loss"	Through the Gate	
2018	Kath Abela Wilson*	"The Green"	Carrying the Branch: Poets in Search of Peace	
2018	David C. Kopaska-Merkel+	"If She Knew She Was a Ghost"	Polu Texni	
2018	Deborah L. Davitt	"Lo Shu's Magic Square"	Snakeskin	
2018	Holly Lyn Walrath	"Lace at the Throat"	2017 SFPA poetry contest	
2019	Sofía Rhei* (translated from Spanish by Lawrence Schimel)	"embalsamados" ("embalmed")	Multiverse: An International Anthology of Science Fiction Poetry	
2019	LeRoy Gorman+	"where to hide an alien in plain sight"	Scryptic	
2019	Sandra J. Lindow	"Negative Space"	Sky Island Journal	
2020	John C. Mannone*	"Standing Up"	Nadwah: Poetry in Translation	
2020	Mark A. Fisher+	"[There are fossils]"	Silver Blade	
2020	Denise Dumars	"2015 Zinfandella"	Dismal Oaks Winery Broadside	
2021	Holly Lyn Walrath*	"Yes, Antimatter Is Real"	Analog Science Fiction and Fact	
2021	Robert Borski+	"The Softness of Impossible Fossils"	Asimov's Science Fiction	
2021	Herb Kauderer	"Frozen Hurricanes"	Minimalism: A Handbook of Minimalist Genre Poetic Forms (Hiraeth Press)	
2022	Jen Stewart Fueston*	"Poem with Lines from my Son"	Bracken	
2022	Mary Soon Lee*	"What Trees Read"	Uppagus	
2022	Jamal Hodge+	"Colony"	Penumbric	
2022	Gene Twaronite	"Future Portrait of Dark Matter"	NewMyths.com	
2023	Rasha Abdulhadi*	"Believe the Graves"	The Deadlands	
2023	Bruce Boston*	"In Perpetuity"	Analog Science Fiction and Fact	
2023	Alyssa Lo+	"Excerpt from a Proposal for the New City"	Strange Horizons	
2023	Kim Whysall-Hammond	"As Slow as Starlight"	Frozen Wavelets	
2023	Sumiko Saulson	"Surviving"	The Rat King: A Book of Dark Poetry (Dooky Zines)	
2023	Warsan Shire	"Trichotillomania"	Bless the Daughter Raised by a Voice in Her Head (Random House)	
2024	Xiao Xi* (translated from Chinese by Yilin Wang)	关于树的无数可能 ("the infinite possibilities of trees")	《风不止》 (The Ceaseless Wind) (Prism International)	
2024	Amelia Gorman+	"All-Kinds-of-Fears"	Dreams and Nightmares	
2024	F. J. Bergmann	"Nikola Tesla"	Star*Line	
2025	Pedro Iniguez*	"Perish and Live Forever"	Mexicans on the Moon: Speculative Poetry from a Possible Future (Space Cowboy Books)	
2025	Ngô Bình Anh Khoa+	"[old junkyard]"	Star*Line	
2025	Jean-Paul L. Garnier	"[warp drive folds spacetime]"	Radon Journal	
2026	Robert Frazier *	"Concrete Cuneiform Poem #1"	-	
2026	F. J. Bergmann+	"Second Place — bound with plaited grass"	-	
2026	Mary Soon Lee	"What Black Holes Read"	-	
