= Ann K. Schwader =

American poet

Ann K. Schwader is an American poet and writer of short fiction based in Westminster, Colorado. Schwader is a grand master of the Science Fiction & Fantasy Poetry Association, a multiple winner of the Rhysling Awards, and has been called one of the "top poets" in the speculative poetry genre.

== Biography ==
Schwader holds an M.A. in English from the Graduate School of the University of Wyoming, having completed a thesis in 1986 on science fiction of the early 20th century by American women.

Poems and short stories by Schwader have appeared in a variety of journals and anthologies. She has stated that among inspirations for her poetry and short fiction she includes world mythologies, especially ancient Egyptian, and the works of horror writers of the past such as H. P. Lovecraft, J. Sheridan Le Fanu, and C. L. Moore. She has been particularly noted for poetry in the genres of science fiction, fantasy, and horror that adheres to traditional verse forms such as the sonnet or the villanelle.

== Recognition ==
In 2018, Schwader was created a grand master of the Science Fiction & Fantasy Poetry Association in recognition of more than 20 years of contributions to the field of speculative verse.

Schwader's poem "To Theia" won in the Short category of the annual Rhysling Awards in 2010 and was subsequently collected in Nebula Awards Showcase 2012. In 2016, her poem "Keziah" tied for first place in the Long category of the Rhyslings. Her poems "The Au Pair from Out There" and "Reflections in a Fading Mir" placed second in the Short category of the Rhyslings in 2000 and 2001, respectively, and two more of her poems placed third in the Short category in 2005 and 2019, with Book Riot calling one of these poems "a mastery of haunting."

Schwader's Wild Hunt of the Stars was a 2010 Bram Stoker Award finalist in the Poetry Collection category, and her book Dark Energies was shortlisted in the same category of the Bram Stokers in 2015. Dark Energies also placed third in the full-length book category of the 2016 Elgin Awards for speculative poetry.

Two poems by Schwader, "Dancing to Van Gogh" and "Returning," placed third in 2008 and 2011, respectively, in the annual Dwarf Stars Awards for short-form poetry.

In 2015, Schwader attended NecronomiCon Providence as a Special Guest of Honor, having been named that year's Poet Laureate by the NecronomiCon organization.

== Bibliography ==
=== Poetry collections ===
- Unquiet Stars (Weird House Press, 2021)
- Dark Energies (P'rea Press, 2015)
- Twisted in Dream (Hippocampus Press, 2011)
- Wild Hunt of the Stars (Sam's Dot Publishing, 2010)
- In the Yaddith Time (Mythos Books, 2007)
- Architectures of Night (Dark Regions Press, 2003)
- The Worms Remember (Hive Press, 2001)
- The Weird Sonneteers, with Keith Allen Daniels and Jerry H Jenkins (Anamnesis Press, 2000)
- Flame Thrower / Blood Rights, with Lucy Taylor (Roadkill Press, 1991)
- Werewoman (Nocturnal Publications, 1990)

=== Short story collections ===
- Dark Equinox & Other Tales of Lovecraftian Horror (Hippocampus Press, 2015)
- Strange Stars & Alien Shadows (Lindisfarne Press, 2003)
