= 2019 in poetry =

Major poetry related events which took place worldwide during 2019 are outlined below under different sections. This includes poetry books released during the year in different languages, major literary awards, poetry festivals and events, besides anniversaries and deaths of renowned poets etc. Nationality words link to articles with information on the nation's poetry or literature (for instance, India or France).

== Events ==
- October 25 – The 2019 Princeton poetry Festival is inaugurated at Lewis Center of Arts by Pulitzer prize winning poet Paul Muldoon.

== Selection of works published in English ==
=== Australia ===
- Charmaine Papertalk Green, Nganajungu Yagu
- Gerald Murnane, Green Shadows and Other Poems

=== Canada ===
- Gwen Benaway, Holy Wild

=== India ===
- Antony Theodore, Jesus Christ in Love
- Nikita Gill, Great Goddesses : Life Lessons from Myths and Monsters
- Tapan Kumar Pradhan, I, She and the Sea
- Tishani Doshi, Small Days and Nights

=== Pakistan ===
- Fatimah Asghar, If They Come For Us

=== Palestine ===
- Hala Alyan, The Twenty-ninth Year

=== Portugal ===
- Ana Luisa Amaral, What's in a Name

=== Puerto Rico ===
- Raquel Salas Rivera, While They Sleep (under the bed is another country)

=== United Kingdom ===
==== England ====
- Anthony Anaxagorou, After the Formalities
- Deryn Rees-Jones, Erato

==== Northern Ireland ====
- Rachel Allen, Kingdomland

=== Ukraine ===
- Ilya Kaminsky, Deaf Republic

=== United States ===
- Hanif Aburraqib, A Fortune for Your Disaster
- Sarah Borjas, Heart Like a Window, Mouth Like a Cliff
- Franny Choi, Soft Science
- Andrea Cohen, Nightshade
- Michael Dickman, Days and Days
- Eve Ewing, 1919
- Camoghne Felix, Build Yourself a Boat
- Olivia Gatwood, Life of the Party
- Campbell McGrath, Nouns and Verbs
- Jane Mead, To the Wren
- Fred Moten, All That Beauty
- Jana Prikryl, No Matter
- Yanyi, The Year of Blue Water

== Works published in other languages ==
=== French ===
- Stephane Bouquet, Les Amours Suivants (The Next Loves)

== Awards and honors by country ==
- See also: List of poetry awards

Awards announced this year:

=== International ===
- Struga Poetry Evenings Golden Wreath Laureate : Ana Blandiana for ‘’Romania’’

=== Australia awards and honors ===
- Victorian Premier's Prize for Poetry formerly known as C. J. Dennis Prize for Poetry : Kate Lilley for ‘’Tilt’’
- Kenneth Slessor Prize for Poetry : Judith Bishop for ‘’Interval’’

=== Canada awards and honors ===
- Archibald Lampman Award: '
- J. M. Abraham Poetry Award:
- Governor General's Awards:
- Griffin Poetry Prize : Eve Joseph for ‘’Quarrels’’
- Latner Writers' Trust Poetry Prize:
- Gerald Lampert Award:
- Pat Lowther Award:
- Prix Alain-Grandbois:
- Raymond Souster Award:
- Dorothy Livesay Poetry Prize:
- Prix Émile-Nelligan:

=== France awards and honors ===
- Prix Goncourt de la Poésie:

=== India awards and honors ===
- Sahitya Akademi Award : Nand Kishore Acharya for Chhelate Hue Apne Ko (Hindi)
- Jnanpith Award : Akkitham Achuthan Namboothiri

=== New Zealand awards and honors ===
- Prime Minister's Awards for Literary Achievement:
  - Poetry:
- Mary and Peter Biggs Award for Poetry :

=== United Kingdom awards and honors ===
- Cholmondeley Award : Malika Booker
- Costa Award (formerly "Whitbread Awards") for poetry : Mary Jean Chan for ‘’Fleche’’
- English Association's Fellows' Poetry Prizes:
- Eric Gregory Award (for a collection of poems by a poet under the age of 30):
- Forward Poetry Prize: Fiona Benson for ‘’Vertigo and Ghost’’
  - Best Collection:
  - Best Poem:
- Jerwood Aldeburgh First Collection Prize for poetry:
- Manchester Poetry Prize : Momtaza Mehri for ‘’Amniotica’’
- National Poet of Wales:
- National Poetry Competition : Susannah Hart for ‘’Reading the Safeguarding and Child Protection Policy’’
- Queen's Gold Medal for Poetry:
- T. S. Eliot Prize : Roger Robinson for ‘’A Portable Paradise’’

=== United States awards and honors ===
- Arab American Book Award (The George Ellenbogen Poetry Award):
  - Honorable Mentions:
- Agnes Lynch Starrett Poetry Prize:
- Anisfield-Wolf Book Award:
- Beatrice Hawley Award from Alice James Books:
- Bollingen Prize:
- Dwarf Stars Award:Sofía Rhei (translated from Spanish by Lawrence Schimel) for "embalsamados" ("embalmed")
- Elgin Award:
  - Marge Simon & Alessandro Manzetti for War (book)
  - Holly Lyn Walrath for Glimmerglass Girl
- Jackson Poetry Prize:
- Lenore Marshall Poetry Prize:
- Los Angeles Times Book Prize:
- National Book Award for Poetry (NBA):
- National Book Critics Circle Award for Poetry:
- The New Criterion Poetry Prize:
- Pulitzer Prize for Poetry (United States) : Forrest Gander for ‘’Be With’’
- Wallace Stevens Award:
- Whiting Awards:
- PEN Award for Poetry in Translation:
- PEN Center USA 2019 Poetry Award:
- PEN/Voelcker Award for Poetry: (Judges: )
- Raiziss/de Palchi Translation Award:
- Rhysling Award:
  - Sarah Tolmie for Ursula Le Guin in the Underworld (long)
  - Beth Cato for After Her Brother Ripped the Heads from Her Paper Dolls (short)
- Ruth Lilly Poetry Prize:
- Kingsley Tufts Poetry Award: Dawn Lundy Martin, Good Stock, Strange Blood
- Kate Tufts Discovery Award: Diana Khoi Nguyen for Ghost Of
- Walt Whitman Prize – – Judge:
- Yale Younger Series: Jill Osier for The Solace Is Not the Lullaby (Judge: Carl Phillips)

==== From the Poetry Society of America ====
- Frost Medal:
- Shelley Memorial Award:
- Writer Magazine/Emily Dickinson Award:
- Lyric Poetry Award:
- Alice Fay Di Castagnola Award:
- Louise Louis/Emily F. Bourne Student Poetry Award:
- George Bogin Memorial Award:
- Robert H. Winner Memorial Award:
- Cecil Hemley Memorial Award:
- Norma Farber First Book Award:
- Lucille Medwick Memorial Award:
- William Carlos Williams Award:

== Deaths ==
Birth years link to the corresponding "[year] in poetry" article:

- January 17 – Mary Oliver (b. 1935), American poet, Pulitzer Prize winner
- January 25 – Krishna Sobti (b. 1925), Indian Hindi poet
- March 15 – W. S. Merwin (b. 1927), American poet and translator
- March 20 – Linda Gregg (b. 1942), American poet
- April 14 – Gene Wolfe, American writer (b. 1931)
- April 29 – Les Murray (b. 1938), Australian poet and critic
- July 05 – Marie Ponsot (b. 1921), American poet, critic and essayist
- September 23 – Al Alvarez (b. 1929), British poet
- October 12 – Kate Braverman (b. 1949), American poet and novelist
- October 15 – Akkitham Achuthan Namboothiri (b. 1926), Indian Malayalam poet and essayist, in Thrissur
- November 7 – Nabaneeta Dev Sen (b. 1938), Indian Bengali poet and writer
- November 24 – Clive James (b. 1939), Australian-born poet, critic and journalist

== See also ==
- Poetry
- List of years in poetry
- List of poetry awards
