= 2026 in poetry =

This article covers 2026 in poetry.

== Events ==
- April 25 — The Plunkett Maine Poetry Festival occurred at the University of Maine at Augusta in Augusta, Maine, United States.
- May 15 – June 14 — The Poesiefestival Berlin 2026 is occurring in Berlin, Germany.
- June 4–7 — The 56th Poetry International Festival will occur in Rotterdam, the Netherlands.
- July 4–11 — The Medellín International Poetry Festival will occur in Medellín, Colombia.

== Awards ==
- Dwarf Stars Award: Robert Frazier, for "Concrete Cuneiform Poem #1"
- Elgin Awards
  - Linda D. Addison and Jamal Hodge, for Everything Endless (Book)
  - M. Frost, for The Women of Myth (Chapbook)
- Hugo Award for Best Poem: Elis Montgomery for "Hex Supply Customer Support Log"
- National Book Award for Poetry: Brenda Hillman for Still House in the Desert: An eco-contemplation.
- Rhysling Awards:
  - Elis Montgomery for "Hex Supply Customer Support Log" (long form)
  - Theodora Goss for "How to become a sea witch" (short form)

== Deaths ==
- January 2
  - Sukumar Barua, Bangladeshi poet
  - Nellie Wong, American poet
- January 7 – Renée Good, American poet and writer
- January 13
  - Dabirul Islam Choudhury, Bangladeshi-British community leader and poet
  - Indira Devi Dhanrajgir, Indian poet and socialite
- January 28 – Peter Hargitai, American author, translator, and poet
- January 30 – X. J. Kennedy, American poet
- April 22
  - David Malouf, Australian poet and writer
  - J. H. Prynne, British poet and literary critic
- June 11– Jane Yolen, American writer and poet.
- August 26 – David C. Kopaska-Merkel, American geologist, poet, and editor
- November 4 – Jack Mapanje, Malawian poet and writer
