= Holly Lyn Walrath =

Holly Lyn Walrath (born 1985) is a poet, fiction writer, and editor based in Houston, Texas.

== Biography ==
=== Early life ===
As a child, Walrath greatly enjoyed the fantasy novels of J.R.R. Tolkien, to which she was introduced by her mother. As a teenager, she was a dedicated listener of emo and punk music and cites the genres as formative influences on her poetry. She began writing poetry at a young age.

=== Education and career ===
Walrath holds a B.A. in English from the University of Texas and an M.A. in creative writing from the University of Denver.

Before switching to writing and editing fulltime, Walrath "worked at a jeans store, as a financial advisor, at an ice cream shop, at a print shop, as a receptionist," and held other odd jobs. Her poems and short stories, largely pertaining to the genres of science fiction and fantasy, have appeared in numerous anthologies and literary journals and have been partially reunited in poetry collections.

Walrath has acted as managing editor for Interstellar Flight Press, a speculative fiction and poetry publisher. In 2018, she guest edited an issue of online speculative poetry journal Eye to the Telescope.

== Published works ==
=== Poetry collections ===
Glimmerglass Girl (Finishing Line Press, 2018)

Numinose Lapidi (Kipple Press 2020)

The Smallest of Bones (Clash Books, 2021)

== Recognition ==
In 2019, Walrath's Glimmerglass Girl won first place in the chapbook category of the annual Elgin Awards.

Walrath's poem "Yes, Antimatter Is Real" won the 2021 Dwarf Stars Award for short-form speculative poetry, and her poem "Lace at the Throat" tied for third place in the 2018 Dwarf Stars.
