= Patrick McKinnon =

American poet

Patrick McKinnon's poems, prose, collage and criticism have appeared in more than 700 literary magazines worldwide including Atom Mind, Henry Miller's Stroker, North American Review, Pulpsmith and Minnesota Monthly. In 1992 he received a Nebula Award for the Best Long Poem in Science Fiction. He has been awarded 3 Minnesota State Arts Board Poetry Fellowships and has authored 15 collections of poetry including Cherry Ferris Wheels (Black Hat Press) which was nominated for a Minnesota Book Award. In 1998 he was voted the Minnesota State Poetry Slam Champion. Since 1978, he has performed his poetry more than 2,500 times at hundreds of venues nationwide. Co-founder and director of the Poetry Harbor literary organization, he also edited and published the infamous underground poetry / collage art magazine, Poetry Motel.

== Awards ==
Arrowhead Regional Arts Council Artist-Support Recipient (2009)
Minnesota State Arts Board Poetry Fellowship (2003, 1995, 1990)
Minnesota State Poetry Slam Champion (1998)
Arrowhead Regional Arts Council Career Development Grant (1997)
Allen Ginsberg Award (1994)
McKnight Foundation Individual Artist Fellowship (1993)
Minnesota State Arts Board Leadership Award (1992)
Lake Superior Writer’s Series Award (1992, 1988, 1985, 1984)
The Rhysling Science Fiction Poem of the Year Award (1991)
Nebula Award (1992)

== Books ==
The Save My Life Book (Poetry Harbor, 2010)
Dressed Across Time (Green Bean Press, 2001)
Me & Death (Speakeasy Press, 1998)
Waking Up (Bull Thistle Press, 1996)
Out Past the Chain Links of Time (Poetry Harbor, 1994)
Are You My Father? (Southwest Louisiana State University Press, 1993)
Models (Boog Literature, 1993)
The Belize Poems (Suburban Wilderness Press, 1992)
Cherry Ferris Wheels (Black Hat Press, 1990)
Walking Behind My Breath (No Press in Chicago, 1988)
Straddling the Bony Death (Burnt Orphan Press, 1987)
Crimes Done Long Ago (photoSTATIC, 1986)
Bumper Cars (Suburban Wilderness Press, 1986)
Search for a Silicon Soul (Mockersatz, 1986)
Children Swing the Rockets (Comet Haley Press, 1985)
Prophet of Outrage (Suburban Wilderness Press, 1985)
Searching for Spiders (Vergin Press, 1985)
Your Way to See With (TUYU Press – Paris, France, 1984)
