= Ruth Berman =

American writer

- Occupation: Writer
- Writing career
- Genres: Science fiction; speculative poetry
- Notable awards: Rhysling Award (2003); Dwarf Stars Award (2006)

Ruth Berman is an American writer of weird science fiction and speculative poetry.

Her short fiction has appeared in Analog, New Worlds, Star Trek: The New Voyages, Shadows 2, Tales of the Unanticipated, and Asimov's Science Fiction. Berman was a staff member of the University of Minnesota.

== Recognition ==
Berman won the 2003 Rhysling Award for Best Short Poem, and the 2006 Dwarf Stars Award for her poem Knowledge Of. In 1973, she was a finalist for the first John W. Campbell Award for Best New Writer.

In 2026, the Science_Fiction & Fantasy Poetry Association named her a Grand Master.

== Bibliography ==
=== Poetry ===
==== Anthologies ====
- Bag Person Press Collective, ed. (2012). Lady poetesses from Hell. Bag Person Press.

==== List of poems ====
Title	Year	First published	Reprinted/collected
The Fates rebel	2015	Berman, Ruth (March 2015). "The Fates rebel". Asimov's Science Fiction. 39 (3): 45.	
Gold ring	2014	Berman, Ruth (February 2014). "Gold ring". Asimov's Science Fiction. 38 (2): 79.	
How many	2013	Berman, Ruth (February 2013). "How many". Asimov's Science Fiction. 37 (2): 69.	
Immigrant to Desert-World	1977	Berman, Ruth (Fall 2013). "Immigrant to Desert-World". Asimov's Choice Astronauts & Androids. 1 (1): 43.	
Knowledge of	2005	Berman, Ruth (Autumn 2005). "Knowledge of" (PDF). Kerem. 10: 104.	

=== Fiction ===
- Berman, Ruth (2011). Bradamant's quest. FTL Publications.
