= Speculative art =

Speculative art can refer to:

- Gambling
- Investment
  - Investing in fine art
- Fantasy art
- Science fiction art
- Alchemy

== See also ==
- Futurology
- Futurism
- Surrealism
- Absurdism
- Dada
- Speculative poetry
- Speculative fiction
