= Samantha Henderson =

American writer

Samantha Henderson is an American science fiction and fantasy writer and poet.

== Personal life ==
Samantha Henderson lives in Covina, southern California with her family, and works as a church secretary.

== Writing career ==
Henderson is best known for her numerous short stories, including "Bottles" (first published in Realms of Fantasy) which was made into a short film in 2010. She has also been published in Strange Horizons, Star*Line, Lone Star Stories and Weird Tales. Her novel, Heaven's Bones (a Ravenloft tie-in) was published in September 2008. Henderson's work has also appeard in the original anthology of werewolf stories, Running With the Pack.

She has served as the treasurer of the Science Fiction Poetry Association and a member of the Science Fiction and Fantasy Writers of America.

== Awards and recognition ==
Her short story "Five Ways Jane Austen Never Died" was included in Prime Books' Fantasy: the Best of the Year for 2006. In 2009, she won second place in the Rhysling Awards in the long and short poem categories with "Spell" and "Hungry: Some Ghost Stories". Her Ravenloft novel "Heaven's Bones" was one of the genre-related nominees for "Best Speculative Fiction Novel: Original" at the 2009 Scribe Awards. The poem "In the Astronaut Asylum", written with Kendall Evans, won first place in the "Long Poem" category at the 2010 Rhysling Awards, and was a 2010 Nebula Award finalist. Her poetry collection "The House of Forever" won second place in the "Best Chapbook" category at the 2013 Elgin Awards.

== Short fiction ==
- "Dead Letter," Strange Horizons, March 2003
- "Five Ways Jane Austen Never Died," The Fortean Bureau, March 2005
- "Manuscript Found Written in the Paw Prints of a Stoat," Lone Star Stories, 2005
- "The Tailor and the Fairy," Lone Star Stories, 2005
- "Scales," Lone Star Stories, 2005
- "Route Nine," Shimmer, 2006
- "Girl with the Lute," Chizine 2006
- "Cinderella Suicide," Strange Horizons, May 2006, reprinted in The Mammoth Book of Steampunk
- "Wild Copper," Steampunk II: Steampunk Reloaded, 2006
- "Honey Mouth," Heliotrope, 2006
- "Such a Lovely Shade of Green," Fantasy Magazine, December 2006
- "Histories," Lone Star Stories, 2006
- "Starry Night," Helix, 2007
- "Bottles," Realms of Fantasy, April 2007
- "Shallot," Fantasy Magazine, 2007
- The Black Hole in Auntie Sutra's Handbag," Lone Star Stories, 2007
- "Curse," Clarkesworld Magazine, December 2007
- "The Mermaid's Tea Party," The Helix Literary Magazine
- "Pretty Mary"
- "Garkain," Fantasy Magazine, April 2009
- "East of Chula Vista," 2009, Abyss and Apex, Issue 29
- "The Red Bride," Strange Horizons, 2010
- "Escaping Salvation," Realms of Fantasy, 2011
- "Beside Calais," 2012
- "Everything You Were Looking For," 2012
- "Your Fairy Is Serenity Elfsong," 2013
- "My Generations Shall Praise," Interzone, 2016
