= Science (1979–1986 magazine) =

American general science magazine

Science 80 to 86
- Publisher: American Association for the Advancement of Science (AAAS)
- First issue: 1979
- Final issue: 1986
- Country: United States

Science 80 to Science 86 were a series of general popular science magazines published by the American Association for the Advancement of Science (AAAS) from November 1979 to July 1986. The name of the magazine changed in November every year, with the number being the two-digit abbreviation of the upcoming year. The AAAS also publishes Science, a scientific journal; the similar names caused some confusion.

The magazine was originally published bi-monthly; from November 1980 it was published ten times per year and had 400,000 subscribers. It was intended to "bridge the distance between science and citizen", aimed at an audience that was technically literate but might not be professional scientists. Each issue contained feature articles and often a photo essay. A guest essay by a well-known scientist was also common, with early contributors including Carl Sagan and Lewis Thomas. Each magazine had a "resources" section containing references for the articles, and recommended further reading. Each issue was about 100 pages, all full color, of which about 20 pages were advertising.

The publication won three National Magazine Awards, in the 'general excellence' category for 1982 and 1983, and the 'public interest' category in 1986. Individual articles won a Science Writing Award and three Rhysling Awards.

Science 80-86 was aimed at readers looking for something more readable than Scientific American, which at that time was a much more technical magazine than it became in the 1990s, while being more in-depth and artfully written than magazines like Popular Science, which tended to cover technology more than the science behind it. This was part of a wider trend in American publishing during the early 1980s: in October 1980 Time Inc. launched Discover, while Science News and Science Digest (among others) adopted a similar format around the same time. By 1984 there were at least 15 national magazines devoted to general popular science, plus others that covered specific sciences. The market proved to be too small to support so many competing magazines, particularly by spreading advertisers too thinly, leading to consolidation in the mid-1980s. By Science 86, the magazine's subscriber numbers had risen to 720,000 (more than double pre-launch estimates), but advertising revenue had halved in two years. The AAAS magazine was purchased by Time in 1986, for a reported $6 million (equivalent to $18 million in 2025), who merged it into Discover after the final issue in July 1986. A few subsequent issues of Discover featured a stamp noting "Now including Science 86", but this quickly disappeared.

== See also ==
- New Scientist
- OMNI
- Popular Mechanics
- Popular science
- Popular Science
