= David C. Kopaska-Merkel =

American geologist, poet, and editor

David C. Kopaska-Merkel (1957 - 2026) was an American geologist, poet, and editor.

== Education and career ==
Kopaska-Merkel held a doctorate in geology. He has worked for the Geological Survey of Alabama in Tuscaloosa and has co-authored numerous articles on topics in paleontology and geology published in peer-reviewed journals such as Computers & Geosciences, The AAPG Bulletin, and the International Journal of Coal Geology. He has also co-authored books addressing topics in the same subject areas. Kopaska-Merkel was a member of the National Center for Science Education.

As an author of fiction, Kopaska-Merkel started out writing short stories. He switched to writing poetry while his partner was pregnant with their first child, a daughter, and since that time has concentrated more on poetry than on prose fiction. Strange Horizons editor Romie Stott has described Kopaska-Merkel's writing style as reminiscent of "a Beat poet who turned down an odd alley in Haight-Ashbury and wound up in outer space." As a poet, his work in the genres of dark fantasy and horror has been especially noted by reviewers.

In 1986, Kopaska-Merkel founded Dreams & Nightmares, "one of the oldest speculative poetry magazines" on record, recognized by reviewers in the field as "a good bet for literate, enjoyable horror and dark fantasy poetry," a venue readers can reliably turn to for "weird and often dark poetry." Since the magazine's inception, Kopaska-Merkel has acted as sole editor of more than 100 issues. In 2020, Dreams & Nightmares had a subscriber base of 88 and a print run of 140 copies.

Kopaska-Merkel also acted as editor of the speculative poetry journal Star*Line from 1996 to 2002. In 2020, he guest-edited an issue of online poetry magazine Eye to the Telescope.

From 2011 to 2014, Kopaska-Merkel held the post of president of the Science Fiction & Fantasy Poetry Association.

David Kopaska-Merkel died on August 26, 2026 at the age of 69.

== Recognition ==
In 2017, Kopaska-Merkel was created a Grand Master of the Science Fiction & Fantasy Poetry Association in recognition of more than twenty years of contributions to the field of speculative poetry. In 2025 the SFPA honoured him with the Lifetime Service Award, for services to the organisation.

Kopaska-Merkel's poem "The Tin Men," written in collaboration with Kendall Evans, won in the Long category of the Rhysling Awards in 2006. His poems "Medusa's Tale" and "Rattlebox III" took second place in the same category of the Rhyslings in 2003 and 2010, respectively, and his poems "Clark the Ripper" and "Tsunami Child" placed second in the Short category of the Rhyslings in 2000 and 2006. Another piece by Kopaska-Merkel took third place in the Short category of the Rhyslings in 2003. Several other poems by Kopaska-Merkel have been longlisted in both categories of the Rhysling Award over the years.

Kopaska-Merkel's The Edible Zoo took second place in the Chapbook category of the Elgin Awards in 2014. The following year, his book SETI Hits Paydirt took second place in the same category of the Elgins. In 2023 his full length collection Some Disassembly Required won the Book award in the Elgins.

Kopaska-Merkel's "If She Knew She Was a Ghost" took second place in the 2018 Dwarf Stars Awards. Several other pieces by Kopaska-Merkel have been nominated for the same award and anthologized in Dwarf Stars 2019, 2020, and 2021.

== Published works ==
=== Non-fiction ===
- Principles of Sedimentary Deposits Stratigraphy and Sedimentology, with Gerald M. Friedman and John E. Sanders (1992, Prentice Hall)
- Footprints in Stone: Fossil Traces of Coal-Age Tetrapods, with Ronald J. Buta (2016, University of Alabama Press)

=== Poetry collections ===
- underfoot (1991, Runaway Spoon Press)
- a round white hole (1993, dbqp press)
- The Conspiracy Unmasked (1994, Dark Regions Press)
- hunger (1996, Preternatural Press)
- Y2K Survival Kit (1999, Smoldering Banyan Press)
- Results of a Preliminary Investigation of Electrochemical Properties of Some Organic Matrices (2000, Eraserhead Press)
- The Ruined City (2003, Gnarled Totem Press)
- Shoggoths (2003, Sam's Dot Publishing)
- I don't know what you're having (2005, Sam's Dot Publishing)
- Separate Destinations, with Kendall Evans (2005, ByrenLee Press)
- The Egg Show (2005, Speakeasy Press)
- The Memory of Persistence (2007, Naked Snake Press)
- Night Ship to Never, with Kendall Evans (2009, Diminuendo Press)
- Brushfires (2010, Sam's Dot Publishing)
- The Tin Men, with Kendall Evans (2011, Sam's Dot Publishing)
- The Edible Zoo (2012, Sam's Dot Publishing)
- Inverted Folk (2012)
- Luminous Worlds (2013, Dark Regions Press)
- SETI Hits Paydirt (2014, Popcorn Press)
- Metastable Systems (2017, Diminuendo Press)
- Entanglement, with Kendall Evans (2018, Diminuendo Press)
- The Ambassador Takes One for the Team: Poems of Loss, Alienation, and Hope (2019, Diminuendo Press)

=== Short story collections ===
- The Deadbolt Casebook (2004, Sam's Dot Publishing)
- Hasp Deadbolt, Private Eye (2007, Sam's Dot Publishing)
- Drowning Atlantis (2007, Spec House of Poetry)
- Nursery Rhyme Noir (2008, Sam's Dot Publishing)
- The Simian Transcript (2010, Banana Oil Books)
- Gods and Monsters (2015, Popcorn Press)
