= F. J. Bergmann =

American editor and writer

F. J. Bergmann (born 1954) is the pen name of Jeannie Bergmann, an American editor and writer of speculative poetry and prose fiction.

== Biography ==
=== Early life ===
F. J. Bergmann was born in Madison, Wisconsin. Her father was a German immigrant who moved to the United States as a young man and earned a master's degree from Harvard. His job demanded a great deal of travel; as a result, Bergmann spent part of her childhood in Janesville, Wisconsin and another part in Paris, France. She is bilingual in English and French.

Bergmann took an interest in speculative fiction early on in life and began writing poetry in high school, seeing some of her work published as a teenager before taking a break from writing poems for a couple of decades.

=== Career ===
Bergmann's poems, short stories, and essays, many of which pertain to the genres of science fiction and fantasy, have appeared in numerous literary journals and anthologies. Her poetry has been partially collected in chapbooks published by Gold Line Press and others.

Bergmann freelances as an editor and book designer and has served as editor for several literary presses and journals. She is currently the poetry and art editor for Mobius: The Journal of Social Change, poetry editor for Weird House Press, and managing editor for MadHat Press. She was twice editor of the Science Fiction & Fantasy Poetry Association (SFPA)'s speculative poetry journal Star*Line, first from 2012 to 2017 and then again from 2020 to 2021. She has also guest-edited an issue of the SFPA's online speculative poetry journal Eye to the Telescope, a publication for which she serves as webmaster.

=== Marriage and children ===
Bergmann lives in Wisconsin with her husband. She has daughters, a horse, and two cats.

== Published works ==
=== Poetry collections ===
- A Catalogue of the Further Suns (Gold Line Press, 2017)
- Out of the Black Forest (Centennial Press, 2012)
- Constellation of the Dragonfly (Plan B Press, 2008)
- Aqua Regia (Parallel Press, 2007)
- Sauce Robert (Pavement Saw Press, 2003)

== Recognition ==
Bergmann's poem "Eating Light" won the 2008 Rhysling Award for speculative poetry in the Short category and was collected in the Nebula Awards Showcase 2010. Her poem “100 Reasons to Have Sex with an Alien” won the 2015 Rhysling in the Long category. She doubly personally honoured by the SFPA in 2024, as Grand Master, for her lifetime achievement, and the Lifetime Service Award, for her services to the organisation.

Bergmann's Out of the Black Forest won the 2013 Elgin Award in the Chapbook category. Her collection A Catalogue of the Further Suns won the 2018 Elgin in the same category and also placed first in the 2016 Gold Line Press manuscript competition.

In 2020, Bergmann's story “A Prize in Every Box” won a Writers of the Future award.

Bergmann's poetry has been the recipient of several other awards and honors, including Heartland Review's 2011 Joy Bale Boone Prize, the 2010 Wis. Fellowship of Poets Triad Prize, the 2010 Atlanta Review International Publication Prize, the 2004 Pauline Ellis Prose Poetry Prize, and the 2003 Mary Roberts Rinehart National Poetry Award.
