= Tiffany Morris =

Mi'kmaw writer

Tiffany Morris is a Mi'kmaw writer from Mi'kma'ki (Nova Scotia, Canada). She writes fiction and poetry in the speculative and horror genres. Her work deals with themes of apocalypse, climate change, decolonization and Indigenous survivance. Morris grew up speaking English and began learning the Mi'kmaw language later in life, considering it a reclamation of the language. She often incorporates the language into her writing.

== Publications ==
Morris's horror poetry collection, Elegies for Rotting Stars was published in 2022 by Nictitating Books. It features poems in English that incorporate Mi'kmaw language words and phrases.

In 2023, she published the horror novella Green Fuse Burning with Stelliform Press, which received a starred review in Publishers Weekly. The book, set in Nova Scotia, is about a Mi'kmaw artist named Rita who spends a week at a cabin in the woods as an artist residency. It explores themes of grief, colonization, apocalypse, art, and language.

In 2026, she published the cannibal-themed horror novella Carnalis with Nictitating Books, about a ballet dancer and her rich girlfriend.

She has a short story in the Indigenous horror collection, Never Whistle at Night: An Indigenous Dark Fiction Anthology called "Night in the Chrysalis".

== Awards and nominations ==
Awards and honors for Tiffany Morris
Year	Award/Honor	Work	Result	Ref.
2023	Elgin Award for poetry	Elegies of Rotting Stars	Third place	
2023	Shirley Jackson Award for Best Novella	Green Fuse Burning	Finalist	
2024	Ignyte Award for Outstanding Novella	Green Fuse Burning	Finalist	
2024	Aurora Award for Best Novelette/Novella	Green Fuse Burning	Finalist	
