= Laurel Winter =

American poet

Laurel Winter (born Laurel Anne Hjelvik in Columbus, Montana; April 22, 1959) is an author of fantasy, science fiction, and poetry. In childhood, she attended a one-room schoolhouse.

Her first published fantasy story was "Mail Order Eyes" in 1988. She has since won two Rhysling Awards, for the poems "Egg Horror Poem" and "why goldfish shouldn't use power tools". Both poems also won the Asimov's Reader Poll. Her novella "Sky Eyes", published in the March 1999 F&SF, won the World Fantasy Award in 2000. She has written young adult fiction. Her novel Growing Wings was first published in 2000 by Houghton Mifflin.

== Bibliography ==
=== Novels ===
- Winter, Laurel (2000). Growing wings. Houghton Mifflin.

=== Short fiction ===
Stories

| Title | Year | First published | Reprinted/collected | Notes |
|---|---|---|---|---|
| ~~Going back~~ in ~~time~~ | 2008 | Winter, Laurel (October–November 2008). "~~Going back~~ in ~~time~~". F&SF. 115 (4&5): 155–157. | | |
| Mail order eyes | 1988 | | | |
| The Moon Garden Cookbook | 1994 | Winter, Laurel (February 1994). "The Moon Garden Cookbook". F&SF. 86 (2). | | |
