= Scott E. Green =

American politician

Scott E. Green (June 2, 1951 - September 27, 2016) was an American politician, poet, and non-fiction writer. He was a four-term member of the New Hampshire House of Representatives for Manchester.

He was a Vice-President of the National Writers Union and a trustee for its At-Large chapter; and president of the Science Fiction Poetry Association.

== Life ==
He was a graduate of Bates College (B.A. Asian History) and Rhode Island College (M.A., American History).

== Bibliography ==
=== Non-fiction ===
- Contemporary Science Fiction, Fantasy and Horror Poetry: A Resource Guide and Biographical Directory (Greenwood Press, 1989) ISBN 0-313-26324-8 ISBN 9780313263248;
- Directory of Repositories of Family History in New Hampshire (Clearfield Co., 1993) OCLC 29535603;
- Isaac Asimov: An Annotated Bibliography of the Asimov Collection at Boston University (Greenwood, 1995) ISBN 0-313-28896-8 ISBN 9780313288968;

=== Poetry ===
Collections

- Baby Sale at the 7-Eleven, Bloom Books, 1984, ISBN 9780935000023
- Private Worlds (1985)
  - Private Worlds: A Revised Atlas. Abbott ePublishing. 2009. ISBN 9781612320403.; Speaking Volumes, 2011, ISBN 9781612320403
- Pulp: Poems in the Pulp Tradition, W.P. Ganley, Publisher, 2004, ISBN 9780932445704
