= Robert Frazier (writer) =

American poet (born 1951)

- Born: Robert Alexander Frazier; 1951 (age 74–75); Ayer, Massachusetts, USA
- Occupation: Writer
- Spouse: Karol Marie Lindquist
- Children: Timalyne

Robert Alexander Frazier (born 1951 in Ayer, Massachusetts) is an American writer of speculative poetry and fiction, as well as an impressionist painter on Nantucket Island.

== Background ==
His mother, Barbara Brown Frazier, was an oil painter, educated by Emil Gruppe (1896–1978) and Dimitri Romanovsky (Russian/American, 1887–1971) for portraiture. His father, Stuart Wilson Frazier, was a civilian teacher of cryptoanalysis (code breaking) for U.S. Army security at Fort Devens, a post he obtained after serving in the Army with a small contingent of Americans during World War II at Bletchley Park, the famous codebreaking center in England.

Frazier was educated at the University of Iowa, where as an undergraduate, after being misplaced in a first course, he was allowed to take graduate courses in poetry at the Iowa Writers' Workshop.

== Move to Nantucket Island ==
In the mid-1970s, he moved to Nantucket Island (his distant relatives were among the early settlers there), where an artists colony existed. He married Karol Marie Lindquist, a maker of the Nantucket Lightship Basket, in 1978. In 1980, he attended the Clarion Workshop in Ann Arbor, Michigan and returned there as tan assistant in 1981.

He also began a career in oil painting then, which after a hiatus to try working as a fiction writer from 1988 to 1998 (he sold 60 or so stories and was a regular attendee at the Sycamore Hill Writer's Workshop), he resumed in 1998.

Frazier freelances as a graphic designer, for a time designing books for SF publisher Mark V. Ziesing and was art director for Nantucket Magazine from 1995 to 2005.

He was president of the Artists Association of Nantucket from 1999 to 2004, and now works as their Curator of Exhibitions.

In 2016, he had his 15th consecutive solo exhibition of oil paintings at the Old Spouter Gallery on Nantucket Island. In 2007, his article on painter Frank Swift Chase was published in Historic Nantucket, a publication of the Nantucket Historical Association.

== Science fiction ==
His first science fiction story, Across Those Endless Skies, appeared in In the Field of Fire (1987). He has won the Rhysling Award three times: for Best Long Poem in 1994, and for Best Short Poem in 1980 and 1989. In 1984, Frazier edited the landmark anthology of SF poetry Burning With A Vision: Poetry of Science and the Fantastic (Owlswick Press).

He is a founding member of the Science Fiction Poetry Association, and a past editor of their newsletter, Star*Line. He also edited and published one of the early magazines of SF poetry, The Speculative Poetry Review (later titled TASP). As a historian, Frazier has written several articles on the evolution of the SF poetry movement...the most recent being a 2005 primer on the Rhysling Awards for the poetry anthology, The Alchemy of Stars, the Rhysling Award Winners Showcase. The Science Fiction Poetry Association named Frazier a Grand Master in 2005.

His Robot Origami, from the Magazine of Fantasy and Science Fiction March 2005, was nominated for the 2006 Rhysling Award. His When Will Time Unfold, from the Magazine of Speculative Poetry, Spring 2006, was nominated for the 2007 Rhysling Award.

His collaborative poem with Bruce Boston, Chronicles of the Mutant Rain Forest, received first place in the 2006 Locus Online Poetry Poll for "Best All-Time Science Fiction, Fantasy, or Horror Poem".

In 2016, 25 years after first winning the award, he won the Asimov's Science Fiction Magazine Reader's Choice Award for poetry.

Frazier's work is taught to students as the major American SF poet; this is done (academic year 2005–2006) at the Faculty of Philology and Arts in the city of Kragujevac, Serbia.

== Family ==
He and his wife have one daughter, born in 1973, Timalyne (also a graduate of Clarion and an SF writer), and two granddaughters, Phoebe and Chloe.

== Bibliography ==
- Phantom Navigation, cover by Margaret Fox, Dark Regions Press, 2012.
- Visions of the Mutant Rain Forest, in collaboration with Bruce Boston, Crystal Lake Publishing, 2017.

=== Poetry ===
Collections and chapbooks

- Frazier, Robert (1978). Peregrine. Dennis, Mass.: Salt-Works Press.
- — (1987). Perception Barriers. Cover by David Macaulay. Berkeley Poets Workshop & Press.
- — (1987). Co-orbital moons. Cover by Gregorio Montejo. Ocean View Books.
- Frazier, Robert & Bruce Boston (1992). Chronicles of the mutant rain forest. Introduction by Lucius Shepard; cover by Robert Frazier. Horror's Head Press.
- Frazier, Robert (1993). Family secrets. Nantucket, Mass.: Eel Grass Press Press. (Note: Actual genre unknown; further bibliographic research needed.)
- Joron, Andrew & Robert Frazier (1993). Invisible Machines. Illustrated by Thomas Wiloch. Jazz Police Books.
- Frazier, Robert (2000). The Daily Chernobyl and other poems. Cover by Katie Trinkle Legge. Anamnesis Press. (Note: Winner of the Anamnesis Press Poetry Chapbook Competition of 1999.)

Anthologies

- Frazier, Robert, ed. (1984). Burning with a Vision: Poetry of Science and the Fantastic. Philadelphia: Owlswick Press.

=== Short fiction ===
Collections

- Shepard, Lucius & Robert Frazier (1989). Nantucket slayrides. Eel Grass Press.

=== Non-fiction ===
- The Art Colony on Nantucket: Sixty Years of Contemporary Art. with George Thomas, The AAN Press, 2005.
- Exiled on Main Street, The AAN Press, 2011.
- The Waterfront Artists, Painters Who Changed Nantucket, The AAN Press, 2012.

———————

Bibliography notes
