= William John Watkins =

American poet

William John Watkins (born 1942) is a science fiction writer and poet.

In the 1970s and 1980s he was known for novels, but in the last decade he has primarily been a short story writer and poet. In 2002 he won the Rhysling Award for short poem for We Die as Angels.

Watkins was a professor of humanities and one of the founding faculty members of Brookdale Community College in New Jersey, from which he retired in 2008. His middle-name is commonly written as "Jon."

== Bibliography ==
=== Books ===
- Watkins, William Jon & E. V. Snyder (1972). Ecodeath. New York: Doubleday.
- Watkins, William Jon (1973). The God machine.
- Clickwhistle (1973)
- The Litany of Sh'reev (1976) (with Gene Snyder)
- What Rough Beast (1980)
- The Centrifugal Rickshaw Dancer (1985) (Legrange League)
- Going to See the End of the Sky (1986) (Legrange League)
- The Last Deathship off Antares (1989)
- Cosmic Thunder (1996)

=== Poems ===
Title	Year	First published	Reprinted/collected
Indefensible disclosures	2013	Watkins, William John (Apr–May 2013). "Indefensible disclosures". Asimov's Science Fiction. 37 (4&5): 73.	
The old time traveler's song	2014	Watkins, William John (Jan 2014). "The old time traveler's song". Asimov's Science Fiction. 38 (1): 51.	
