= Duane Ackerson =

American writer (1942–2020)

- Born: October 17, 1942; New York City, New York, U.S.
- Died: April 19, 2020 (aged 77); Salem, Oregon, U.S.
- Occupations: Poet, writer

Duane Ackerson (October 17, 1942 – April 19, 2020) was an American writer of speculative poetry and fiction.

Не taught at the University of Oregon, then headed the creative program at Idaho State University. He lived in Salem, Oregon, where he died on April 19, 2020.

Duane Ackerson's work has appeared in anthologies that include The Year's Best SF 1974, 100 Great Science Fiction Short Short Stories, Future Pastimes, and the textbook Writing Poetry. He has won the Rhysling Award for Best Short Poem twice, in 1978 and 1979.

Ackerson's poems are translated into Russian by Dmitry Kuzmin.

== Bibliography ==
- The Bird at the End of the Universe
- The Eggplant & Other Absurdities
- Weathering
- UA Flight to Chicago. Lincoln, Nebraska: The Best Cellar Press, 1971.
