= W. Gregory Stewart =

Poet

W. Gregory Stewart (born in Toronto) is a poet most associated with speculative fiction. He has won the Rhysling Award four times.

He was born in 1950 in Canada, has lived in Australia, and currently resides in Los Angeles. Aside from poetry he also writes short fiction and was a past nominee for the Nebula Award for Best Short Story. Stewart conducts a writer's workshop for youth, works for a public utility, and grows heirloom tomatoes from seed. He is married to illustrator Helen Shoenfeld and has a son, Jesse.
