= Krysada Panusith Phounsiri =

American poet

- Born: Krysada Panusith Phounsiri; March 20, 1988 (age 38); Houayxai, Bokeo, Laos
- Citizenship: United States of America
- Education: Double B.A. in Physics & Astrophysics, University of California, Berkeley, 2010

Krysada Panusith Phounsiri (born March 20, 1988) is a Lao-American artist and engineer based in San Diego, California.

== Family life ==
He emigrated to America with his family in 1989 from Hoyaxai, Bokeo, Laos. He is nicknamed "Binly" in many circles. He grew up in San Diego, California. He obtained his United States citizenship in November, 2009.

== Education ==
Krysada Panusith Phounsiri attended Eastlake High School in Chula Vista, California. He graduated from University of California, Berkeley in 2010 with a Physics & Astrophysics Double Major with a Minor in Poetry.

== Writing and dance ==
His work has been featured in the Journal of Southeast Asian American Education and Advancement, Little Laos on the Prairie, the Twin Cities Daily Planet, Asian American Press, and the Smithsonian Asian Pacific American Center’s “A Day In The Life Of Asian America” digital exhibit.

Krysada Panusith Phounsiri's debut collection of poetry “Dance Among Elephants,” was published by Sahtu Press in 2015. It is a collection of poetry and photography that explored the challenge of identity politics, ideology, and the music of relationships between families and communities rebuilding their lives. It was released during the 40th anniversary of the Lao Diaspora that began with the end of the Laotian Secret War in 1975.

He pushes his passion for dancing, mainly the Hip Hop Street Dance known as Breaking, by traveling to various regions of the world to compete in competitions and teach workshops. He is also involved in developing the Snap Pilots Photography Project; a venture he and a friend created.

== Professional life and community service ==
Krysada Panusith Phounsiri volunteers regularly with the Laotian American community, particularly in Southern California and for national organizations such as Laotian American National Alliance.

== Awards and recognition ==
- Solo Boy Champion in Sweet Addiction 2007 in San Luis Potosí
- Footwork Champion at Mighty 4 San Francisco 2007
- Two-on-Two Champion at Headhunters Eight Year Anniversary in San Jose 2008
- 1st Place at UC Davis Battle at the Buzz 2009
- 1st Place at Skills to Pay the Bills 2010 in Vallejo, CA
- All Styles Champion at Town to the Boogie Down 2010 in Hayward, CA
- Redbull BC One Semi-Finalist 2012 in San Diego, CA
- Illest 2014 Crew Battle Champions | Pro Breaking Tour in Orange County, CA
- Style Elements 2014 Crew Battle Champions | Pro Breaking Tour in San Jose, CA
- Cell-E-Brate All Styles Champion and Breaking Battle Finalist in San Francisco, CA
- All the Way Live 2014 Crew Battle Champions in Fremont, CA
- Breaks Kru 2014 Anniversary Finalist in New York, NY
- R16 North American Solo Bboy Champion 2014 in Las Vegas, NV
- Circa 2015 Crew Battle Champions | Pro Breaking Tour in Las Vegas, NV
- Warsaw Challenge 2015 Crew Battle Champions in Warsaw, Poland
- West Coast Rockers Anniversary Finalist in Fullerton, CA
- 2015 San Diego Delegate to the 2nd National Lao American Writers Summit.
- 2016 Rhysling Award for Best Poem of the Year, Long Form, Science Fiction Poetry Association (Tie)
