= Eternal Haunted Summer =

Online Pagan literature magazine

Eternal Haunted Summer is an ezine dedicated to Pagan poetry and short fiction. It also features reviews of Pagan works and interviews with Pagan authors, as well as reviews and interviews with authors of works that might interest a Pagan audience. Currently, Eternal Haunted Summer (EHS) is the only ezine to accept poetry, short fiction, reviews and interviews from any Pagan tradition. EHS also seeks to connect creators and publishers by posting submission calls for other collections and journals.

EHS was created and is edited by Rebecca Buchanan. While attempting to publish her own poems and stories, Buchanan discovered that options for Pagan authors to sell their literary works were limited, and thus she created EHS to fill the niche. EHS publishes new issues quarterly at the solstices and equinoxes. The inaugural issue was published for the 2009 Winter Solstice. The ezine has published works by authors such as Kayleigh Ayn Bohémier, Penelope Friday, Galina Krasskova, Terece Kuch, P. Sufenas Virius Lupus, C.S. MacCath, and Shirl Sazynski.

EHS has been featured on the blog GeekMom. Buchanan has been interviewed by Duotrope Digest, Collective Review and Sequential Tart.
