= Science Fiction & Fantasy Poetry Association =

American society

- Formation: 1978
- Region served: International
- President: Brian U. Garrison
- Vice President: Diane Severson Mori
- Secretary: John Philip Johnson
- Treasurer: Jordan Hirsch
- Website: sfpoetry.org

The Science Fiction & Fantasy Poetry Association (SFPA) is a society based in the United States with the aim of fostering an international community of writers and readers interested in poetry pertaining to the genres of science fiction, fantasy, and/or horror. The SFPA oversees the quarterly production of literary journals dedicated to speculative poetry and the annual publication of anthologies associated with awards administered by the organization, i.e. the Rhysling Awards for year's best speculative poems in two length categories and the Dwarf Stars Award for year's best very short speculative poem. Every year since 2013, the SFPA has additionally administered the Elgin Awards for best full-length speculative poetry collection and best speculative chapbook.

== History ==
The SFPA was established as the Science Fiction Poetry Association in 1978 by author and linguist Suzette Haden Elgin.

Elizabeth Chater served as the first president of the SFPA, followed by Gene Wolf. Other SFPA presidents have included Deborah P Kolodji, David C. Kopaska-Merkel, Bryan D. Dietrich, and, most recently, Bryan Thao Worra.

In 2017, members of the SFPA voted to rename the organization the "Science Fiction & Fantasy Poetry Association," while maintaining the acronym "SFPA."

Since 1978, the organization has overseen the production of the speculative poetry journal Star*Line, currently edited by John Reinhart. In addition to publishing poetry and reviews of books released in the relevant genres, Star*Line provides SFPA members and other subscribers with market listings and industry news bulletins. Past editors include Jean-Paul Garnier, Vince Gotera, F. J. Bergmann, Marge Simon, and founder Suzette Haden Elgin.

Since 2011, the SFPA has additionally published the online poetry magazine Eye to the Telescope. In order to broaden the scope of the organization's literary footprint, Eye to the Telescope has a rotating editorship, with a different editor responsible for selecting the theme and contents of each issue of the journal.

== Publications ==
=== Journals ===
- Star*Line (1978- )
- Eye to the Telescope (2011- )

=== Annual anthologies ===
- Rhysling Anthology (1981- )
- Dwarf Stars (2006- )

=== Books ===
- The Science Fiction Poetry Handbook by Suzette Haden Elgin (2005, Sam's Dot Publishing)
- The Alchemy of Stars, ed. Roger Dutcher and Mike Allen (2005, Prime Books)
- The Alchemy of Stars II, ed. Sandra J. Lindow (2019, SFPA)

== Awards ==
=== Awards for works ===
Since its inception in 1978, the organization has administered the Rhysling Award for best science fiction poetry of the year. The award is given in two categories: "Best Long Poem" for works of 50 or more lines and "Best Short Poem" for works of 49 or fewer lines. The SFPA also bestows the Dwarf Stars Award for short poem (up to ten lines). Since the 1980s the Rhysling-winning poems are included in the Nebula Awards anthology published by the Science Fiction and Fantasy Writers of America, along with (since 2008) the Dwarf Stars winning poems. The two awards involve the publication of annual anthologies of nominated works.

Since 2006 (with a hiatus in 2009 and 2011), the SFPA has sponsored an annual contest for best poem in the dwarf (up to 10 lines), short (11 to 49 lines), and long category (50 lines and above).

In 2013, SFPA inaugurated the Elgin Awards for poetry collections, named after SFPA founder Suzette Haden Elgin. Two awards are given annually, for best speculative chapbook and best full-length speculative poetry collection.

=== Personal Awards ===
Since 1999, the SFPA has intermittently conferred Grand Master status on select poets who "for a period of no fewer than 20 years" have been actively publishing speculative poetry deemed "exceptional in merit, scope, vision and innovation." Poets must be living to be considered for the honor.

- 1999 - Bruce Boston
- 2005 - Robert Frazier
- 2008 - Ray Bradbury
- 2010 - Jane Yolen
- 2015 - Marge Simon
- 2015 - Steve Sneyd
- 2017 - David C. Kopaska-Merkel
- 2018 - Ann K. Schwader
- 2020 - Linda D. Addison
- 2022 - Mary Soon Lee
- 2022 - Akua Lezli Hope
- 2024 - F.J. Bergmann
- 2026 - Ruth Berman

In addition to the Grand Master status, since 2023 the SPFA has awarded the President's Lifetime Service Award for "exemplary attitude and dedication to the SFPA and the speculative genre".

- 2023 - Deborah P Kolodji
- 2024 - F.J. Bergmann
- 2025 - David C. Kopaska-Merkel
