= Mary Soon Lee =

American writer and poet

- Born: 1965 (age 60–61); London, England
- Education: Trinity Hall, Cambridge University
- Occupations: Writer, poet
- Spouse: Andrew Moore
- Writing career
- Genre: speculative fiction
- Website: marysoonlee.com

Mary Soon Lee (born 1965) is an American speculative fiction writer and poet.

== Biography ==
=== Early life ===
Mary Soon Lee was born in London, England, to a Malaysian Chinese father and an Irish mother. As a child, she enjoyed reading science fiction and fantasy, especially the works of Ursula K. Le Guin and Robert A. Heinlein. She cites J.R.R. Tolkien's Lord of the Rings and the fantasy poetry of Alfred, Lord Tennyson, among others, as works that influenced her relationship to literature from an early age.

As a child, Lee wanted to be a scientist. Her focus narrowed to mathematics in her teenage years.

=== Education and career ===
Lee earned a Master of Arts in mathematics and a diploma in computer science from Trinity Hall, Cambridge. She also holds a Master of Science in Astronautics and Space Engineering from Cranfield University.

In 1990, Lee moved to the United States. She began writing television scripts and short stories shortly thereafter, making her first professional sale in 1993. Since that time, her poems and short stories, mostly pertaining to the genres of science fiction or fantasy, have appeared in numerous journals and anthologies, and she has published collections of her work.

=== Marriage and children ===
Lee currently resides in Pittsburgh, Pennsylvania with her husband, son, and daughter.

== Recognition ==
Poems by Mary Soon Lee placed first in the Rhysling Awards for speculative poetry in the Long category in 2014 and in the Short category in 2018. Poems of hers placed third in the Long category of the Rhyslings in 2017 and 2018, and her work was nominated for both categories of the award on several other occasions. She was honoured as a SPFA Grand Master in 2022.

Lee's poetry collections Crowned: The Sign Of The Dragon Book 1 and Elemental Haiku placed first in 2016 and second in 2020, respectively, in the annual Elgin Awards for best SFF poetry book.

Her fiction has been widely anthologized, including appearances in volumes 4 and 5 of Year's Best SF and honorable mentions in volumes 16 and 18 of The Year's Best Science Fiction.

== Bibliography ==
=== Short fiction ===
Collections

- Winter Shadows and Other Tales (2001)
- Ebb Tides and Other Tales (2002)

=== Poetry ===
Collections

- Crowned (2015)
- Elemental Haiku (2019)
- The Sign of the Dragon (2020)
