= Suzette Haden Elgin =

American linguist and writer

- Haden at Norwescon in 2005
- Born: Patricia Anne Suzette Wilkins; November 18, 1936; Jefferson City, Missouri, U.S.
- Died: January 27, 2015 (aged 78)
- Education: University of California, San Diego; California State University, Chico; University of Chicago
- Occupations: conlanger; linguist; poet; teacher; writer
- Spouse(s): Peter Haden (married 1955; he predeceased her); George Elgin (married 1964)
- Children: 4
- Relatives: Josepha Haden (granddaughter)
- Writing career
- Years active: 1960s–2010s
- Period: Contemporary
- Genres: Fantasy; science fiction; social science fiction; speculative poetry
- Subject: Sociology of language
- Movement: Feminist science fiction
- Website: sfwa.org/members/elgin

Suzette Haden Elgin (born Patricia Anne Suzette Wilkins; November 18, 1936 – January 27, 2015) was an American researcher in experimental linguistics, construction and evolution of languages and poetry and science fiction writer. She founded the Science Fiction Poetry Association and is considered an important figure in the field of science-fiction constructed languages. Her best-known non-fiction includes her Verbal Self-Defense series.

== Early life ==
Patricia Anne Suzette Wilkins was born in 1936 in Jefferson City, Missouri.

== Linguistics, teaching and writing ==
She attended the University of California, San Diego (UCSD) in the 1960s, and began writing science fiction in order to pay tuition. She gained a PhD in linguistics, and was the first UCSD student ever to write two dissertations (on English and Navajo).

She created the engineered language Láadan for her Native Tongue science fiction series. A grammar and dictionary was published in 1985. She supported feminist science fiction, saying "women need to realize that SF is the only genre of literature in which it's possible for a writer to explore the question of what this world would be like if you could get rid of [Y], where [Y] is filled in with any of the multitude of real world facts that constrain and oppress women. Women need to treasure and support science fiction."

In addition, she published works of shorter fiction. Overlying themes in her work include feminism, linguistics and the impact of proper language, and peaceful coexistence with nature. Many of her works also draw from her Ozark background and heritage.

== Later years and death ==
Elgin became a professor at San Diego State University (SDSU). She retired in 1980 and lived in Arkansas with her second husband, George Elgin. She died at age 78 in 2015 from undisclosed causes. She was survived by her husband until his own death in 2020. Her son Michael pre-deceased her.

== Works ==
=== Bibliography ===
Elgin wrote thirteen novels, seventeen short stories, dozens of poems and songs and three dozen non-fiction works.

=== Filmography ===
Elgin wrote the screenplay for Tales from the Darkside season 3, episode 10 "Deliver Us From Goodness".
