= Speculative poetry =

Genre of poetry focussing on fantastic, science fictional and mythological themes

Speculative poetry is a genre of poetry that focuses on fantastic, science fictional and mythological themes. It is also known as science fiction poetry or fantastic poetry. It is distinguished from other poetic genres by being categorized by its subject matter, rather than by the poetry's form. Suzette Haden Elgin defined the genre as "about a reality that is in some way different from the existing reality."

Due to the similarity of subject matter, it is often published by the same markets that publish short stories and novellas of science fiction, fantasy and horror, and many authors write both in speculative fiction and speculative poetry. The Rhysling Award was the first major award for an individual speculative poem, first given in 1978 with the founding of the US-based Science Fiction & Fantasy Poetry Association. Since then, awards and recognition for poems, collections, and poets, has increased. In 2023, the Science Fiction and Fantasy Writers Association voted to allow poets entry into its organization, for the first time since its 1965 inception.

== History ==
Much of the Romantic poetry of the 19th century used techniques that are seen in modern fantasy literature such as retellings of classical mythology and European folklore, both to show alternative angles in the stories and to explore social issues. Many distinguished poets were women and many of them used folktales as an acceptable social camouflage with which to explore feminist concerns. One of the most celebrated of these poems, Christina Rossetti's 1862 "Goblin Market", still remains a relatively popular source of critical debate.

Andrew Joron wrote in 1981 that over the past decade in the United States, "it was possible to create a tradition, that established and defined the genre" of science fiction poetry.

In common with the gradual recognition of science fiction and fantasy as distinct literary genres in the 1930s, science-fictional poetry began publication as a distinct genre in the pulp magazines of the United States. Fantasy-specific Weird Tales (1923–1954) and its brief compatriot Unknown (1939–43) were the only major publishers. They were succeeded by more serious venues including the US-based The Magazine of Fantasy & Science Fiction (F&SF) (1949–), the UK-based flagship of the New Wave movement New Worlds while it was under the editorship of Michael Moorcock between 1964 and 1970, and the annual reprint anthologies of F&SF and The Year's Best Science Fiction edited by Judith Merril. These anthologies drew much of their content from mainstream or literary sources.

In the 1960s, anthologies of original speculative material began to be published. F&SF ceased accepting poetry in 1977, a gap in the market taken up by the newly established Asimov's. The Science Fiction Poetry Association (SFPA) was founded by Suzette Haden Elgin the following year. In the 1970s, Elgin's colleague Frederick J. Mayer for some time awarded an annual Clark Ashton Smith Award for best fantastic poetry.

By 1990, Asimov's remained the major news-stand market, but a diverse array of predominantly US-based small press markets had developed, many lasting several decades, and many choosing purely electronic publication post-2000. This is in common with mainstream written poetry in the US over this time.

SFPA (now called the Science Fiction and Fantasy Poetry Association) awards the Rhysling for short- and long-form SF and fantasy poetry awards annually; most winners have been either science fiction or science-themed rather than fantasy or horror. Most Rhysling nominees have been from the small-press poetry journals Dreams & Nightmares, The Magazine of Speculative Poetry, and the SFPA's own journal, Star*Line. Winners have occasionally been reprinted in the Nebula Awards anthology. The first one to include poems was Nebula Award Stories Seventeen, edited by Joe Haldeman.

Other major genre awards have included poetry. The Horror Writers Association has a separate recognition for single-author collections of horror poetry, the Bram Stoker Award, though there is no facility in the Bram Stoker Award to honor anthologies of horror and weird poetry. The 2025 Hugo Awards included Best Poem as a one-time, special category, and there is a movement to add the category permanently. Starting in 2026 SFWA will include Best Poem as part of the Nebula Awards.

== Subgenres and themes ==
=== Science fiction ===
Science fiction poetry's main sources are the sciences and the literary movement of science fiction prose.

Scientifically informed verse, sometimes termed poetry of science, is a branch that has either scientists and their work or scientific phenomena as its primary focus; it may also use scientific jargon as metaphor. Important collections in this area include the 1985 anthology of predominantly Science-published poems Songs from Distant Worlds. This area often sees work by mainstream poets, and works on these themes dominated the early years of the Rhysling awards.

=== Mythic ===
Mythic poetry deals with myth and folklore, with a particular focus on reinterpreting and retelling traditional stories. Some of the content in this genre sparks a lot of conversation and thinking. They rose to popularity for their styles revolving around folktales and storytelling aspects.

=== Horror ===
Horror poetry is a subset which, in the same way as horror fiction, concentrates on ghostly, macabre, spectral, supernatural themes. Modern horror poetry may also introduce themes of sadism, violence, gore, and the like. One of the most memorable poets that specializes in this genre is Edgar Allan Poe, with works focusing heavily on the macabre and death aspects. His works have made their mark on the future of horror.

=== Weird ===
Weird poetry is a subset. It differs in several important ways from straightforward modern horror poetry. It originally arises from the early 20th century literary tradition of 'the weird' also known as weird fiction, in which certain groups of authors collectively attempted to move beyond tired old stories of haunted castles, graveyard ghosts, and suave vampires. It tends to be concerned with the subtly uncanny, and is expressed in macabre and serious tones. The atmospheres of a certain place may be evoked, and the narrator may discover certain weird details of that place which arouse a sense of unexplainable dread. Some weird poetry will describe timeless geological forces or the night sky, trying to harness the feeling of dread to a wider and sublime 'cosmic awe' about mankind's insignificance in the universe. Yet the narrators of such poetry tend to be unreliable, and may perhaps be on the edge of madness. They may describe or hint at unreal nature-defying events which occur in otherwise normal places - although without the overt technical explanation found in science fiction, and without the violence and sadism common to modern post-1970 horror. S. T. Joshi's short book of essays Emperors of Dreams: Some Notes on Weird Poetry (2008) examines a number of key weird poets and highlights them while doing so. While weird poetry has appeared in a vast array of anthologies and journals (both professional and small-press), perhaps the first journal devoted exclusively to this form is Spectral Realms. It was founded in 2013 by the editor S.T. Joshi and published by Hippocampus Press.

== See also ==
- New Weird
- Scifaiku
- Slipstream (genre)
- Speculative art
- Speculative fiction
