= James O'Sullivan (academic) =

Irish academic and author

- Born: James Christopher O'Sullivan; 1986 (age 39–40); Cork, Ireland
- Occupations: Writer, publisher, editor, academic
- Website: jamesosullivan.org

James Christopher O'Sullivan is an Irish writer, publisher, editor, and academic from Cork city. He is a university lecturer, the founding editor of Blackwater Publishing and the now-defunct New Binary Press, and the writer of several academics and creative books.

== Career ==
=== Academia ===
O'Sullivan works in the Digital Humanities, with specific research interests in computer-assisted text analysis and cultural analytics, digital fiction, and digital publishing. He has held faculty positions at institutions such as Pennsylvania State University and the University of Sheffield. As of 2017, he was a lecturer at University College Cork.

In 2019 he published Towards a Digital Poetics: Electronic Literature & Literary Games (Palgrave Macmillan 2019). He has edited several academic volumes, including Technology in Irish Literature & Culture (Cambridge University Press 2023), The Bloomsbury Handbook to the Digital Humanities (Bloomsbury 2023) and Reading Modernism with Machines (Palgrave Macmillan 2016).

O'Sullivan has published scholarly papers and essays in a number of peer-reviewed academic journals and books, including Poetics, Digital Scholarship in the Humanities (Oxford University Press), Leonardo (The MIT Press), Digital Humanities Quarterly, the International Journal of Humanities and Arts Computing (Edinburgh University Press), Digital Studies/Le Champ Numérique, and Literary Studies in the Digital Age (Modern Language Association).

O'Sullivan has been the lead researcher or principal investigator on academic projects such as C21 Editions. Funded under a joint initiative of the Irish Research Council (IRC) and the United Kingdom's Arts and Humanities Research Council (AHRC), C21 Editions: Editing & Publishing in the Digital Age received grants worth approximately €650,000.

His various uses of stylometry to analyse the work of James Patterson have garnered media attention, including being cited by Anthony Lane in The New Yorker.

He is former associate director of the Digital Humanities Summer Institute at the University of Victoria, British Columbia.

O'Sullivan sometimes writes on the subject of Irish higher education in venues such as The Irish Times. In 2018, he publicly criticised Irish universities for focusing too much on commercially oriented "skills" to the detriment of critical thinking. O'Sullivan has also claimed that many Irish academics are working class, that the humanities have a reproducibility problem, and he has also publicly criticised students for anti-social behaviour.

He has written several features and opinion pieces on more general social and political matters for periodicals in Ireland and internationally, including The Guardian, the LA Review of Books, and The Irish Times.

=== Publishing ===
O'Sullivan founded New Binary Press in 2012, a publishing house dedicated to the publication of both print and electronic literature. Works published by the press include Graham Allen's The One That Got Away, which was shortlisted for the Shine/Strong Award 2015, while Unexplained Fevers by Jeannine Hall Gailey came second in the 2014 Science Fiction Poetry Association's Elgin Award.

O'Sullivan has been vocal on the economic realities facing independent publishing houses, as well as an advocate of the role they play in the development of literary communities. He sees Irish writing as belonging to many different perspectives, and is simply "literature that is embedded in the very soul of our island". Despite his profile as a digital publisher and scholar, O'Sullivan believes that print books have far greater "material and cultural importance" than digital formats, describing Kindle and iTunes as a "dangerous axis of power". O'Sullivan has been critical of major literary competitions, particularly those which he deems to be under the influence of their commercial sponsors. He has called for "improved transparency" and "the removal of commercial influences" from literary competitions, arguing that "small publishers can't take risks on large entry fees if there is any doubt in their mind over how decisions are being made". Despite his profile as a publisher of digital poetry and fiction, O'Sullivan has questioned the role that publishers can play in this field.

=== Creative writing ===
O'Sullivan's first collection of poetry, Kneeling on the Redwood Floor, was released by Lapwing Publications in 2011, a work which the author himself did not rate very highly. In 2014, Alba Publishing released his second collection, Groundwork, followed in 2017 by Courting Katie, published by Salmon Poetry. Reviewing Courting Katie, Dedalus poet Matthew Geden describes O'Sullivan as a "vibrant voice" that offers "timely reminders to look closer at the world around us". Writing in Poetry Ireland Review, Jessica Traynor likens O'Sullivan to a "latter-day Kavanagh" who "breathes life into deserted streets and grey city corners". O'Sullivan's poetry has been published in a number of Irish literary journals and periodicals, including The Stinging Fly, The SHOp, and Cyphers. In 2016, O'Sullivan was placed third in the Gregory O'Donoghue International Poetry Prize. He has twice been shortlisted for the Fish Poetry Prize, as well as the Fish Short Story Prize. He received a High Commendation in Munster Literature Centre Fool for Poetry 2014 International Chapbook Competition and 2013 Charles Macklin Poetry Prize.

== Personal ==
O'Sullivan was born and raised in Cork city, Ireland, a place for which he has often expressed great affection and featured in his work. He is the grandson of the performer Billa O'Connell who died in 2021. O'Sullivan attended Coláiste an Spioraid Naoimh, though did not enjoy his time at school. He is a graduate of Cork Institute of Technology, University College Cork, and University College Dublin. While raised Catholic, O'Sullivan has been highly critical of the Catholic Church.

== Bibliography ==
Title	Publisher	Year	ISBN-13
Books
Towards a Digital Poetics: Electronic Literature & Literary Games	Palgrave Macmillan	2019	978-3-030-11310-0
Edited Books
Technology in Irish Literature & Culture	Cambridge University Press	2023	978-1-009-18288-1
The Bloomsbury Handbook to the Digital Humanities	Bloomsbury	2023	978-1-350-23211-2
Digital Art in Ireland: New Media and Irish Artistic Practice	Anthem Press	2021	978-1-78527-478-7
Electronic Literature as Digital Humanities: Contexts, Forms, and Practices	Bloomsbury	2021	978-1-5013-6350-4
Reading Modernism with Machines	Palgrave Macmillan	2016	978-1-137-59568-3
Poetry Collections
Courting Katie	Salmon Poetry	2017	978-1-910669-85-3
Groundwork	Alba Publishing	2014	978-1-910185-03-2
Kneeling on the Redwood Floor	Lapwing Publications	2011	978-1-907276-84-2
