= New Binary Press =

Irish publishing house

New Binary Press was an independent publishing house founded in 2012 in Cork city, Ireland. In a Tweet dated 19 January 2021, the New Binary Press announced that it had ceased operations. It published print books and electronic literature, specialising in more experimental works, as well as a number of periodicals. It was established and run by its editor, James O'Sullivan.

In 2017, the literary scholar Dr Kenneth Keating described New Binary Press as being one of the first publishing houses to "explicitly [cross] the division between online and print publishing in Irish poetry in a more progressive fashion". Irish poet Matthew Geden also noted the role which New Binary Press played within Irish publishing, stating that "the press has published books by a number of new and interesting writers [and] The emergence of new voices owes much to small publishers like New Binary and others".

== History ==
New Binary Press was founded in 2012 by James O'Sullivan, who stated that he founded the press because other Irish publishers were ignoring the creative potential of digital technology, and that he wanted to make "a real tangible contribution" to the literary world. The press was officially launched by Irish poet Leanne O'Sullivan at the City Library, Cork, on 5 April 2013. A similar event was held at The Teachers' Club, Parnell Square, Dublin, several days later.

New Binary Press announced that it was ceasing operations in a Tweet posted on 19 January 2021. In 2017, New Binary Press' editor, James O'Sullivan, had been vocal on the difficulties faced by independent publishers in Ireland, and also questioned the need for publishers in the digital fiction marketplace.

== Publication history ==
The press had a number of critical successes: Graham Allen's The One That Got Away (2014) was shortlisted for the Shine/Strong Award 2015, while Unexplained Fevers (2013) by Jeannine Hall Gailey came second in the 2014 Science Fiction Poetry Association's Elgin Award. In 2016, the press published its first novel, Karl Parkinson's The Blocks, which would go on to earn considerable critical acclaim. novelling, a work of recombinant fiction by Will Luers, Hazel Smith, and Roger Dean, won the ELO's 2018 Robert Coover Award for a Work of Electronic Literature.

New Binary Press published a number of works of electronic literature, most notably by artists like Nick Montfort, Stephanie Strickland, Jason Nelson, and John Barber. The first work that New Binary Press published was digital poetry by Graham Allen, entitled Holes. The one-line-a-day semi-autobiographical narrative was praised and analysed by several scholars and critics. In 2017, two born-digital works published by New Binary Press, The Bafflement Fires by Jason Nelson and novelling, were shortlisted for the Turn on Literature Prize, co-funded by the European Union's Creative Europe Programme.

A number of New Binary Press publications represent marked political leanings. In 2017, the press published The Elysian: Creative Responses, an anthology of poetry, short fiction and critical essays. Edited by Graham Allen and Billy Ramsell, the collection includes contributions by a number of notable writers and critics, including Cónal Creedon, Doireann Ní Ghríofa, and Frank McDonald. The collection uses the symbol of The Elysian building in Cork city to reflect on the excesses of Celtic Tiger Ireland.

Earlier in 2017, New Binary Press released John Barber's Remembering the Dead: Northern Ireland, a web-based commemoration of the victims of The Troubles which builds on earlier iterations intended as a response to gun violence in the US.

In 2018, New Binary Press published Autonomy, edited by Kathy D'Arcy, a project which sought to raise funds in support of the campaign to repeal the Eighth Amendment of the Constitution of Ireland, as well as contribute to the campaign for "safe, legal abortion" in Ireland. Kit de Waal associated New Binary Press with the publication of working class writers.
