= Damian Walford Davies =

Welsh author & academic (born 1971)

Damian Walford Davies FLSW
- Born: 16 January 1971 (age 55)
- Occupations: Lecturer; university administrator; poet
- Spouse: Francesca Rhydderch
- Parent: Hazel Walford Davies (mother)
- Relatives: Jason Walford Davies (brother)

Academic background
- Education: Ysgol Gyfun Gymunedol Penweddig
- Alma mater: University of Oxford
- Doctoral advisor: Jonathan Wordsworth

Academic work
- Discipline: English literature
- Sub-discipline: Creative writing
- Institutions: Aberystwyth University; Cardiff University
- Main interests: Welsh literature in English, Romanticism
- Writing career
- Language: English; Welsh
- Genres: Poetry; libretto; short stories; literary criticism
- Notable works: Docklands: A Ghost Story (2015); Roald Dahl: Wales of the unexpected (2016)

Professor Damian Walford Davies (born 16 January 1971 in Aberystwyth) is a Welsh writer and English literature academic. He has been the Provost and Deputy Vice-Chancellor of Cardiff University since 2021. His specialist areas are Romanticism and English language works by Welsh writers.

== Early life and education ==
Davies was born on 16 January 1971 in Aberystwyth. His mother was the academic and author Hazel Walford Davies (1940–2025). He has a twin brother Jason, who is also an academic and writer. The brothers moved with their family to Oxford before returning to Wales in 1976.

Davies completed his undergraduate studies at St John's College, Oxford, graduating with First Class Honours. He undertook his doctoral studies at Balliol College under the supervision Jonathan Wordsworth, a great-great-great-nephew of William Wordsworth.

== Career ==
=== Academia ===
==== 1997–2013: Early career at Aberystwyth University ====
Davies lectured at the Department of English and Creative Writing at Aberystwyth University from 1997 to 2013. He later became head of department and Rendel Chair of English at Aberystwyth.

During his time at Aberystwyth, Davies had many collaborations with his colleague Richard Marggraf Turley, notably resulting in the poetry collections Whiteout and the critical studies volume entitled, The Monstrous Debt: Modalities of Romantic Influence in Twentieth-Century Literature (both published in 2006).

==== 2013–present: Move to Cardiff University and administration ====
Davies joined the School of English, Communication & Philosophy at Cardiff University in 2013, becoming head of school a year later. He was appointed as Pro-Vice-Chancellor for the College of Arts, Humanities and Social Sciences in 2018. In 2021, he succeeded Karen Holford as Cardiff's Provost and Deputy Vice-Chancellor.

In 2025, Cardiff University's senior management was criticised for its controversial proposal to slash 400 jobs and close down several of its departments. Opposing the proposal, the University and College Union, which represent university staff, called for the Learned Society of Wales to suspend Davies's fellowship status, as well as that of Professor Wendy Larner, the university's vice-chancellor. Davies was reportedly chairman of the redundancy committee during this time.

=== Literary career ===
Davies is a fluent Welsh speaker and writes in Welsh as well as in English. He has published 6 poetry collections between 2009 and 2023. He has also had a short story and a libretto published.

Davies has cited R. S. Thomas, H.D., Thomas De Quincey, M. R. James, Sherwood Anderson, and Edgar Lee Masters as authors whose works have influenced him.

Davies served as the chair of Literature Wales between 2012 and 2018. During his tenure, in 2017, the organisation was criticised in a Welsh Government's report for poor governance and for "lacking the skills and experience" to handle public funds. Davies refuted "in the strongest term" the accuracy of the report as well as its lack of objectivity.

In 2018, Davies acted as an adjudicator for the Crown competition at the National Eisteddfod, alongside Christine James and Ifor ap Glyn. In 2024, he was announced as a mentor on "Representing Wales", a writer development programme organised by Literature Wales.

=== Media appearances ===
In 2011, Davies co-presented the programme Llwybr yr Arfordir (English: The Coast Path) on S4C with Jon Gower and Elinor Gwynn, which explored the archaeology, nature, and history of the Pembrokeshire coast. In 2014, he appeared alongside his twin brother Jason on S4C's arts programme Pethe in a special episode about poets Dylan Thomas and R. S. Thomas.

== Awards, honours and recognition ==
Davies won the Chair at the Urdd National Eisteddfod in 1993 for a poem about faces. He was the first man to have won one of the main prizes at the Urdd Eisteddfod. In 2009, he won the translation challenge at the National Eisteddfod for his translation of Gillian Clarke's poem Slate, Oak, Glass. Of his poetry collections, Docklands: A Ghost Story was named Poetry Book of the Month in February 2019 by The Telegraph.

Davies was elected as a Fellow of the Learned Society of Wales in 2017.

== Personal life ==
Davies was married to the novelist and academic Francesca Rhydderch. A recreational runner, he took part in the 2022 Cardiff Half Marathon to fundraise for Cardiff University. Since writing Viva Bartali! (published in 2023), a biography-in-verse of the cyclist Gino Bartali, he has picked up cycling and become a "mad fan of the sport".

Davies was baptised into the Church in Wales in his early 20s.

== Selected bibliography ==
Key
^{†}	Denotes that the publication is in Welsh.
^{‡}	Denotes that the publication is bilingual (in English and Welsh).

=== Poetry ===
- With Richard Marggraf Turley - Whiteout (Parthian, 2006) ISBN 978-1905762156
- Published by Seren Books:
  - Suit of Lights (2009) ISBN 9781854114938
  - Witch (2012) ISBN 9781854115799
  - Judas (2015) ISBN 9781781722220
  - Docklands: A Ghost Story (2019) ISBN 9781781724934
  - Viva Bartali! (2023) ISBN 9781781727089
- Published by Rack Press Poetry:
  - Alabaster Girls (2017) ISBN 9780992765484

=== Edited anthologies ===
- William Wordsworth: Selected poems (J. M. Dent's Everyman Classics, 1994) ISBN 978 1 85715 245 6
- Waldo Williams: Rhyddiaith [English: Prose] (University of Wales Press, 2001) ISBN 9780708317310 ^{†}
- Co-edited with Kevin Mills - Free Verse: Poems for Richard Price (Seren, 2023) ISBN 9781781727461

=== Critical studies ===
==== As sole author ====
- Presences that Disturb: Models of Romantic Identity in the Literature and Culture of the 1790s (University of Wales Press, 2002) ISBN 9780708317389
- Cartographies of Culture: New Geographies of Welsh Writing in English (University of Wales Press, 2011) ISBN 9780708324769

==== As editor ====
- Megalith: Eleven Journeys in Search of Stones (Gomer Press, 2006) ISBN 9781843236658
- With Jason Walford Davies - Cof ac Arwydd: Ysgrifau Newydd ar Waldo Williams [English: Memory and Sign - Essays on Waldo Williams] (Cyhoeddiadau Barddas, 2006) ^{†}
- With Richard Marggraf Turley - The Monstrous Debt: Modalities of Romantic Influence in Twentieth-Century Literature (Wayne State University Press, 2006) ISBN 978-0-8143-3058-6
- With Lynda Pratt - Wales and the Romantic Imagination (University of Wales Press, 2007) ISBN 9780708320662
- Romanticism, history, historicism: Essays on an orthodoxy (Routledge, 2009) ISBN 9780203877982
- Echoes to the Amen: Essays after R.S. Thomas (University of Wales Press, 2003) ISBN 9780708321911
- Roald Dahl: Wales of the unexpected (University of Wales Press, 2016) ISBN 978-1-78316-940-5, 978-1-78316-941-2
- Counterfactual Romanticism (Manchester University Press, 2019) ISBN 9781784991418
- With Sally Bushell and Julia S. Carlson - Romantic cartographies: Mapping, literature, culture, 1789–183 (Cambridge University Press, 2020) ISBN 9781108635936

=== Other works ===
- Y Ffisegwyr - a Welsh translation of The Physicists by Friedrich Dürrenmatt (Canolfan Astudiaethau Addysg Aberystwyth, 1991) ISBN 1 85644 060 5^{†}
- With Anne Eastham - Saints and Stones: Guide to the Pilgrim Ways of Pembrokeshire (Gomer Press, 2002) ISBN 1-84323-1247
- Y Tro Olaf [English: The Last Time], in 20 Stori Fer - Cyfrol 2 [English: 20 Short Stories - Volume 2] (Y Lolfa, 2009) ISBN 978 1 84771 119 9^{†}
- With Siân Melangell Dafydd and Paul White (photographer) - Ancestral House: The Lost Mansions of Wales / Tai Mawr a Mieri: Plastai Coll Cymru (Gomer Press, 2012) ISBN 9781848513891^{‡}
- With Mererid Hopwood and Paul White (photographer) - Poets Graves / Beddau'r Beirdd (Gomer Press, 2014) ISBN 9781848517394^{‡}
- The mare's tale: A libretto - set to music by Mark Bowden (Grey Mare Press, 2019) ISBN 9781999647438
