= Dublin Review =

Dublin Review may refer to:

- Dublin Review (Catholic periodical), published in London 1836–1969
- The Dublin Review, a literary magazine published in Dublin since 2000

== See also ==
- Dublin Review of Books
