= Eimear Ryan =

Irish writer and publisher

Eimear Ryan (born 1986 or 1987) is an Irish writer, editor, publisher and one of the founding editors of Banshee Press. Her debut novel, Holding Her Breath, was published by Penguin Books in 2021. She was 'writer-in-residence' at University College Cork in 2021. She has also written a book for children, and had her work adapted into the award-winning short film, The Grass Ceiling.

== Career ==
=== Writing ===
Ryan's writing has appeared in several publications, such as The Stinging Fly, Granta, The Dublin Review, and Winter Papers. In 2009, she received a Hennessy Award for her writing.

Her debut novel, Holding Her Breath, was published by Sandycove, an imprint of Penguin Books. The novel was shortlisted for the John McGahern Prize.

She is a columnist at the Irish Examiner. In 2019, Ryan's book on Cora Staunton was published by The O'Brien Press.

=== Film ===
Her essay "The Fear of Winning" was adapted into a short film, The Grass Ceiling, directed by Iseult Howlett. The Grass Ceiling received the Special Jury Award at the Catalyst International Film Festival 2020, won first prize in the WFTi Showcase Awards 2020, and was nominated for Best Short Film at the IFTA Film & Drama Awards.

The film screened at several of Ireland's film festivals, including the Cork International Film Festival 2019, where the film premiered, the Dublin International Film Festival 2020, the Fastnet Film Festival 2020, and the IFI Documentary Festival 2020. It was also shown at the Newport Beach Film Festival 2020.

=== Publishing ===
With Laura Cassidy and Claire Hennessy, Ryan founded Banshee Press. The press publishes the literary journal Banshee twice a year. Banshee Press also publishes books, including a collection of short stories, Paris Syndrome by Lucy Sweeney Byrne (2019), and a poetry book, Gold Light Shining by Bebe Ashley (2020). Banshee Press was included in The Bookseller's "Rising Stars" list in 2021.

=== Sports ===
Ryan was born in County Tipperary. She represented her county in the All-Ireland Senior Camogie Championship. She now plays club camogie for St Finbarr's in Cork.

== Publications ==
=== Novels ===
- Holding Her Breath. Dublin: Penguin Sandycove. 2021. ISBN 9781844885466

=== Short fiction ===
- 'Keep the Wolf from the Door'. The Stinging Fly. 2011.
- ‘The Recital’. Town and Country: New Irish Short Stories. London: Faber. 2013.
- 'Wearing the Pinks'. The Dublin Review. Spring 2014.
- 'Lane In Stay'. The Long Gaze Back. Dublin: New Island. 2015. ISBN 9781848404205
- 'Idioglossia'. Granta (online). 2016.
- 'The Arborist'. The Dublin Review. Summer 2016.

=== Essay/memoir ===
- 'The Fear of Winning'. Winter Papers. 2016.

=== For children ===
- Cora Staunton. Dublin: The O'Brien Press. 2019. ISBN 9781788491051
