= Banshee Press =

Irish publisher and literary journal

Banshee Press is an independent publisher in Ireland, founded in 2014. Banshee releases a journal twice a year and since 2019 has published books by writers who previously featured in the journal.

The publisher was listed in The Bookseller's list of rising stars for 2021.

== Banshee Journal ==
The Banshee Journal was founded in 2014 by Claire Hennessy, Eimear Ryan, and Laura Cassidy. After a Kickstarter campaign, where a subscription list was filled in three days, the first edition of the journal was published in Autumn/Winter. The first edition included works by Sinéad Gleeson, Jessica Traynor and Deirdre Sullivan and featured an interview with Nuala Ní Chonchúir.

As a journal founded by three women, Banshee receives more submissions and publishes more work from female writers than some other literary magazines. In an interview for the Bath Flash Fiction Award in 2017, the editors said "we've published more women, on average, than a typical journal. This isn't intentional on our part – we're interested in good writing, first and foremost – but it is, of course, telling that 'more men' is viewed as the norm while 'more women' is clearly a scary feminist agenda. We still occasionally get people asking if men are 'allowed' to submit – though less of it the longer we've been around".

== Banshee Press ==
The Banshee Press list launched in 2019 and went on to publish seven titles. Its first title was Paris Syndrome by Lucy Sweeney Byrne, collection of autofiction short stories. Reviewing the collection for The Irish Times, Sarah Gilmartin said that "it is easy to see why Banshee – an up-and-coming literary magazine with a strong feminist bent – has chosen Paris Syndrome as its first book for publication. It is a commendable debut with plenty of hallucinations, anxious sweating and little in the way of extreme ennui".

== List of published books ==
- Harbour Doubts by Bebe Ashley (2025)
- Tenterhooks by Claire-Lise Kieffer (2025)
- Let's Dance by Lucy Sweeney Byrne (2024)
- High Jump as Icarus Story by Gustav Parker Hibbett (2024)
- Penelope Unbound by Mary Morrissy (2023)
- Let the Dead by Dylan Brennan (2023)
- Pacemaker by David Toms (2022)
- In Her Jaws by Rosamund Taylor (2022)
- I Want to Know That I Will Be Okay by Deirdre Sullivan (2021)
- Gold Light Shining by Bebe Ashley (2020)
- Paris Syndrome by Lucy Sweeney Byrne (2019)
