= Isabella Lickbarrow =

English poet (1784–1847)

Isabella Lickbarrow (5 November 1784 – 10 February 1847) was an English poet from Kendal who is sometimes associated with the Lake Poets. She published two collections: Poetical Effusions (1814) and A Lament upon the Death of Her Royal Highness the Princess Charlotte and Alfred, a Vision (1818). Her work covers various subjects, but scholars have noted her topographical and political poetry about the Napoleonic Wars.

== Life ==
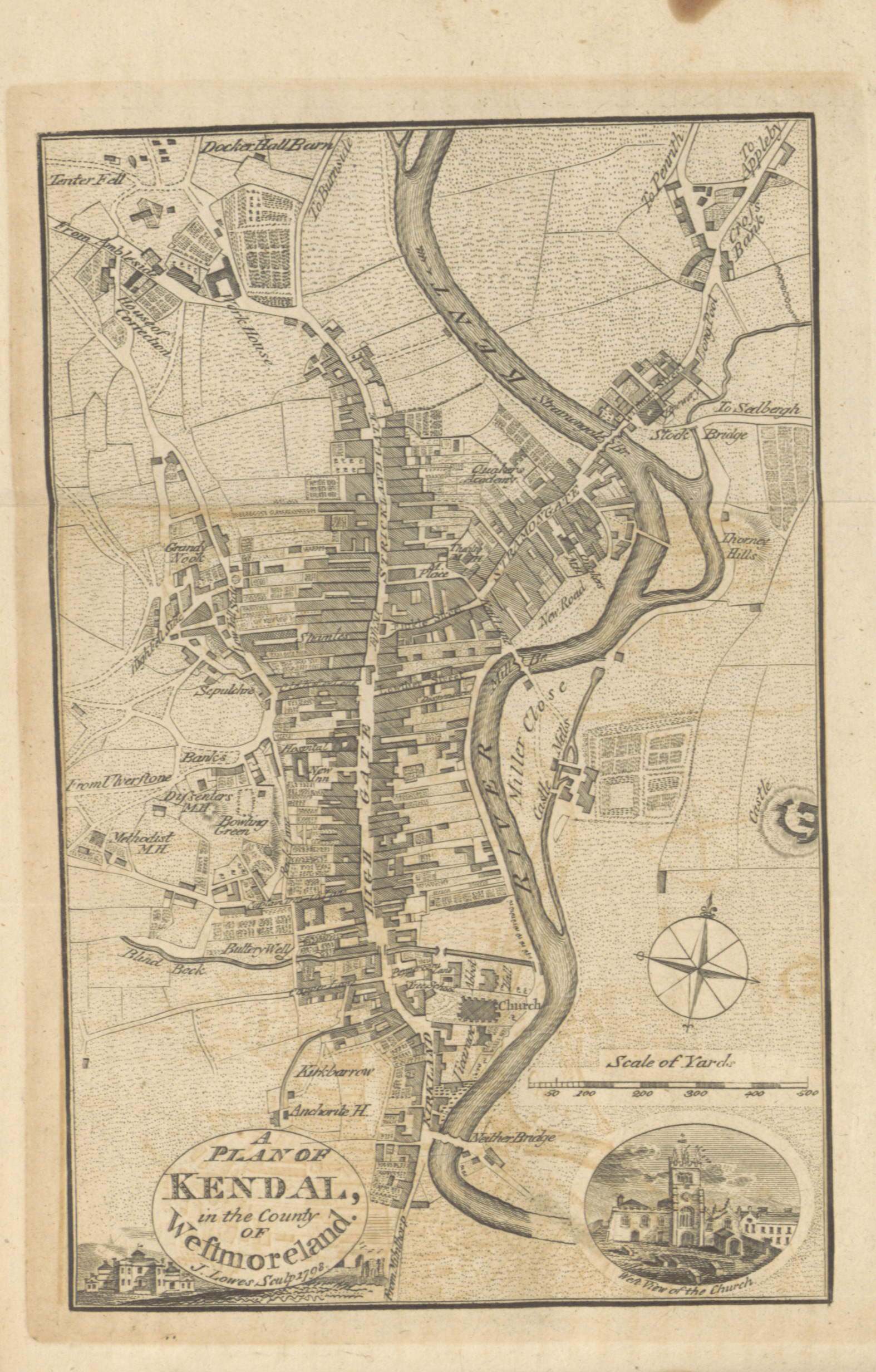
Map of Kendal, 1814. Lickbarrow was a native of the town and published her first book there.

Lickbarrow lived in Kendal for most, if not all, of her life. Her mother died when she was five years old, and her father died when she was 20, after which she turned to publishing poetry as a way to earn a living for herself and her two sisters. This is apparent from the preface to Poetical Effusions (1814), which describes the work as a way to "assist the humble labours of herself and her orphan sisters."

Lickbarrow came from a Nonconformist family. Her father, originally a Quaker, became a Unitarian. She was a relative of John Dalton, who subscribed to Poetical Effusions, her first collection.

A near-contemporary article in Notes and Queries claims Lickbarrow was "more than once an inmate of the Asylum for Lunatics, at Lancaster," but present-day scholars have not verified this claim.

Isabella Lickbarrow died of tuberculosis in Kendal in 1847.

== Poetry ==
Lickbarrow began publishing in the Westmorland Advertiser, a local newspaper, in November 1811 and quickly gained a following, which led to the release of Poetical Effusions by the newspaper's publisher in 1814.

Effusions was funded by subscription, as were many literary works at the time. Her subscribers included Sara Hutchinson, who was William Wordsworth's sister-in-law and a friend and muse of Coleridge, Wordsworth himself, Thomas De Quincey, and Robert Southey. (Note: On subscriptions, see Griffin, Dustin (6 June 1996). Literary Patronage in England, 1650–1800. Cambridge: Cambridge University Press. p. 267. doi:10.1017/cbo9780511519024. ISBN 978-0-521-56085-6. "Subscription has rightly been described as a kind of democratized patronage, whereby a large number of patrons may, for a relatively small outlay, find their names listed among the subscribers.") William Axon, writing in Notes and Queries in 1908, recalled Effusions in elegiac tones: "[L]et us hope that the result of the publication was to make life easier for Isabella Lickbarrow, although it has not secured her the immortality of Sappho."

Lickbarrow's poetry was versatile and evinced an interest in matters at home and abroad. Jonathan Wordsworth, describing Lickbarrow as a "poet of genuine individuality," notes that her poems show a preoccupation with the Napoleonic Wars, among other subjects. Behrendt observes that her poems on war attend to the troubles that soldiers, often poor and ill-served by the government, faced when returning home from the campaign. (Note: On the poor treatment of soldiers in the Napoleonic Wars, see Myerly, Scott Hughes (1996). British Military Spectacle: From the Napoleonic Wars Through the Crimea. Cambridge, Massachusetts: Harvard University Press. pp. 53–54. ISBN 978-0-674-08249-6. "The enlistment bounty never covered the cost of clothing and necessaries, except during the French and Crimean wars, so a recruit might enter the army in debt and not receive any pay for six months or more after enlistment.")

Lickbarrow "bid the nation rejoice" upon Napoleon's abdication.

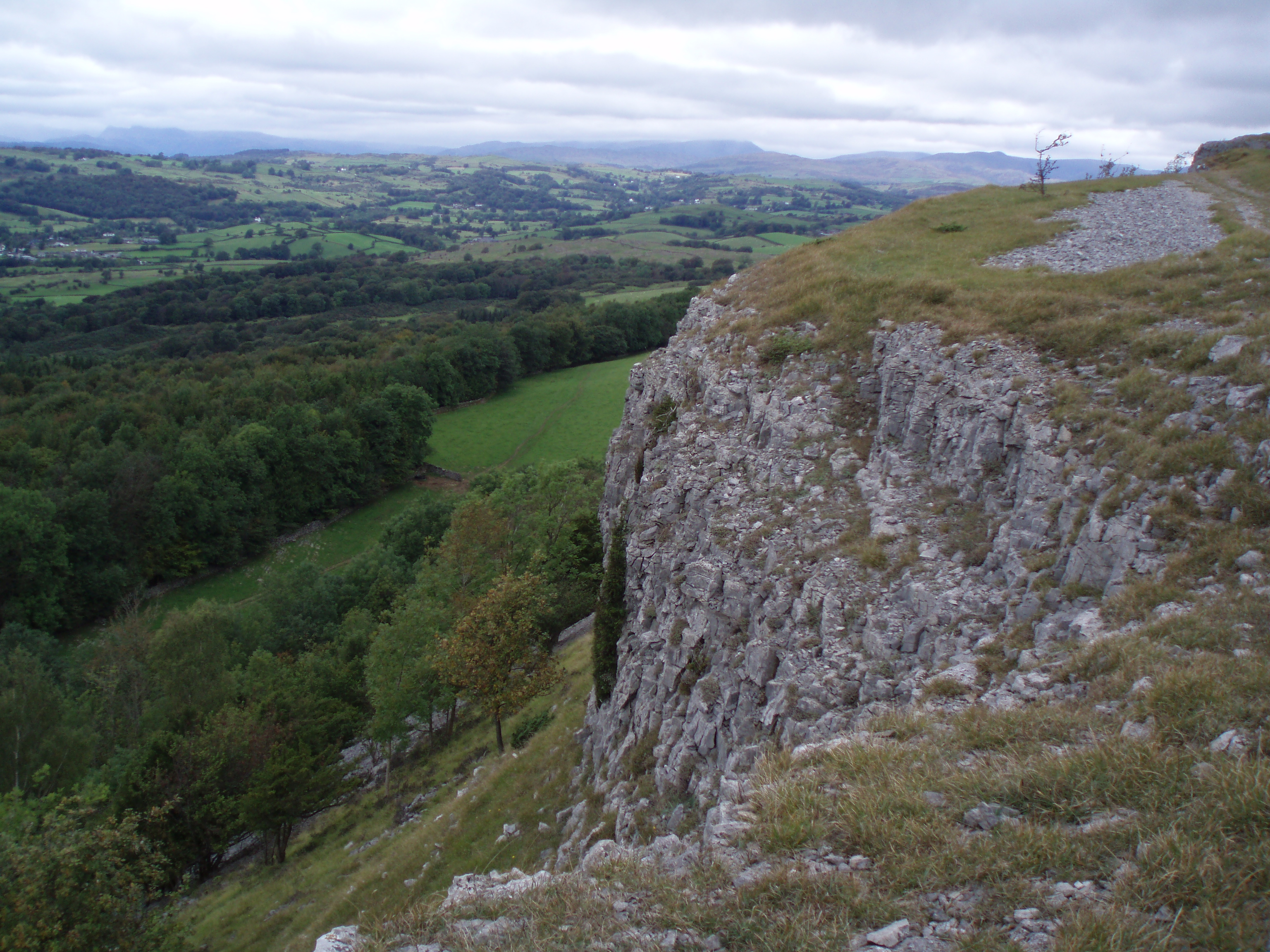
Scout Scar or Underbarrow Scar, near Kendal. Lickbarrow's 'On Underbarrow Scar' (composed about 1814) calls it a "lofty barrier of the waste".

Knowles argues that "Lickbarrow's pre-Waterloo poetry voices a strong objection to Britain's role in the war in Europe," observing that this could be expected given her Quaker background. Knowles also suggests that Lickbarrow's Lament upon the Death of Her Royal Highness the Princess Charlotte and Alfred, a Vision (1818), about the death of Princess Charlotte of Wales in 1817, reflects unease about Britain's future — given that George IV, subject to widespread popular disdain, was about to succeed his father — and views Britain's ancient history, exemplified in the person of Alfred the Great, as a potential source of wisdom for the country in the early 19th century. Knowles observes that Lickbarrow was "one of the only female poets to continue to write overtly political poetry in the post-Waterloo period."

Although her subjects included politics and foreign affairs, Lickbarrow also wrote frequent topographical poetry about locations in the Lake District and elsewhere, including Underbarrow Scar, Esthwaite Water, and South Stack Lighthouse (in Wales).

Poetical Effusions went out of print after its first publication until 2004, when it was released in an edited collection by the Wordsworth Trust. An anonymous contemporary reviewer of the Effusions wrote in the Monthly Review: "[t]he introduction to these verses is written with a simplicity and humility which are sufficient to mollify the severest critic; and the compositions, though not brilliant, display much-chastened feeling, and a poetical perception of the beauties of nature." Feldman observes that the work "contains unusual variety for a first book," noting that it features poems on several different subjects and in various styles.

== Works ==
Lickbarrow published two collections and numerous poems in local newspapers.

- Lickbarrow, Isabella (1814). Poetical Effusions. Kendal/London: M. Branthwaite & Co./J. Richardson. Printed twice in 1814, once locally in Kendal and once in London.
- Lickbarrow, Isabella (1818). A Lament upon the Death of Her Royal Highness the Princess Charlotte; and Alfred, a Vision. Liverpool: G. F. Harris & Bros.
- Lickbarrow, Isabella (7 August 2004) [1814]. "On the Fate of Newspapers". The Guardian. A much-noted composition on the publication of poems in newspapers that concerns neither war nor topography. (Note: Newspaper poetry was common in the 18th and 19th centuries. On Romantic newspaper poetry, see Thomson, Heidi (2016). Coleridge and the Romantic Newspaper: The 'Morning Post' and the Road to 'Dejection'. Palgrave Macmillan. p. 33. ISBN 9783319319780.)

== Sources ==
- Behrendt, Stephen C. (2000). "'A Few Harmless Numbers': British Women Poets and the Climate of War, 1793–1815". In Shaw, Philip (ed.). Romantic Wars: Studies in Culture and Conflict, 1793–1822. London: Routledge. doi:10.4324/9781315243900. ISBN 978-1-315-24390-0.
- Curran, Stuart (March 1996). "Isabella Lickbarrow and Mary Bryan: Wordsworthian Poets". The Wordsworth Circle. 27 (2): 113–118. doi:10.1086/TWC24042633. ISSN 0043-8006. JSTOR 24042633. S2CID 165291195.
- Knowles, Claire (24 March 2020). "Female Romantic Poetry, 1798–1819: The Climate of Fear and the Loss of a Radical Generation". Women's Writing. 28 (3): 305–319. doi:10.1080/09699082.2020.1746050. ISSN 0969-9082. S2CID 216352534.
- Parrish, Constance (1 March 2008). "Isabella Lickbarrow and Thomas Rodick". Notes and Queries. 55 (1): 43–45. doi:10.1093/notesj/gjm275. ISSN 0029-3970.
- Wordsworth, Jonathan (1997). The Bright Work Grows: Women Writers of the Romantic Age. Poole, Dorset: Woodstock Books. ISBN 1-85477-212-0. OCLC 35292994.

== See also ==
- List of 18th-century British working-class writers
