= Graham Allen (writer) =

Writer and academic from Ireland

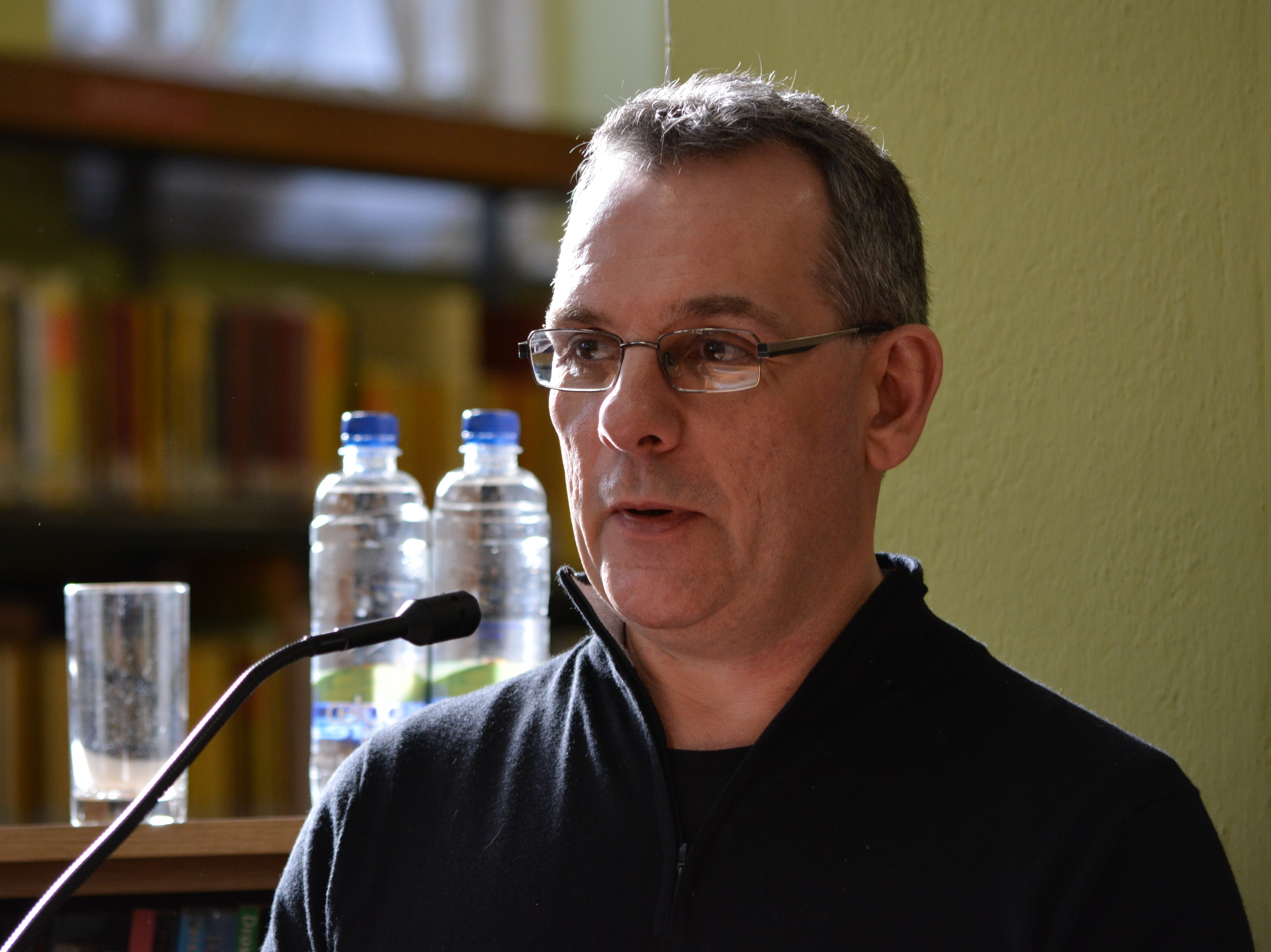
Graham Allen at launch of his first collection of poetry, The One That Got Away (New Binary Press 2014).

Graham Allen (born 23 December 1963) is a writer and academic from Cork city, Ireland. He is the author of two collections of poetry, The Madhouse System (2016) and The One That Got Away (2014). He is a former recipient of the Listowel Single Poem Prize, awarded each year at Listowel Writers' Week. As a literary critic, he has published numerous books, including Harold Bloom: Towards a Poetics of Conflict (1994), Intertextuality (2000), and Roland Barthes (2003).

== Scholarship ==
Allen is Professor of Literature at University College Cork. His book for Routledge's New Critical Idiom series, Intertextuality (2000), had a second edition in 2011 and eight re-prints since first publication. In 2008, he published a book on Frankenstein and a monograph on Mary Shelley. He published a monograph on Harold Bloom, Harold Bloom: Towards a Poetics of Conflict (1994), and later co-edited the Salt Companion to Harold Bloom (2007). Two of his books, Intertextuality (2000) and Roland Barthes (2003), have been translated into Indonesian Japanese, Korean, and Persian.

== Creative writing ==
Allen has had two collections of poetry published by New Binary Press, The Madhouse System (2016) and The One That Got Away (2014). His poetry tends to deal with social and political injustices. Both of his collections have been positively reviewed. Reviewing Allen's work in Southword journal, Roisin Kelly writes: "These are the words we need to hear in times like these. I am glad that Allen has seen fit to tell us what we are in danger of forgetting." His elegy to David Bowie, included in The Madhouse System, was selected by RTÉ, Ireland's national broadcaster, as their poem of the week in December 2016.

Allen's first collection of poetry, The One That Got Away, was shortlisted for the 2015 Shine/Strong Award, while the manuscript was nominated for Salt Publishing's Crashaw Prize and the Munster Literature Centre's Fool For Poetry Prize.

His poetry has appeared in literary journals like Southword, The Stinging Fly, Poetry Ireland Review, and The Rialto. He was the winner of the Listowel Single Poem Prize in 2010.

In 2016, Allen was included in a special issue of the Poetry Ireland Review entitled, The Rising Generation. Edited by Vona Groarke, the issue consisted of a selection of poets considered to be the new voices of literary Ireland. His ‘’Bright Star: Elegy for David Bowie’’ was RTE Poem of the Week in December 2016.

Allen is the author of Holes, a work of digital poetry. Holes is a ten syllable one line per day poem which began on 23 December 2006. Also published by New Binary Press, the work has drawn the attention and elicited a positive response from scholars and critics. In 2017, Holes released a limited edition print edition of the poem's first decade of lines.

In 2017, Allen co-edited The Elysian: Creative Responses (New Binary Press) with fellow Irish author Billy Ramsell, an anthology of works inspired by The Elysian building in Cork city. The anthology features a number of prominent figures, including Cónal Creedon, Doireann Ní Ghríofa, Frank McDonald, Madeleine D'Arcy, E. R. Murray, and Patrick Cotter.

== Personal life ==
Allen went to Barking Abbey School and then studied at St David's College, Lampeter, the University of Wales, receiving his degree in English in 1985. He obtained his MA and PhD at the University of Sheffield. He tutored at Sheffield and at the University of Cambridge and later was a lecturer in the Department of English at the University of Dundee (1990 to 1995). He has been at the University College Cork since 1995, where he is now Professor of Literature.
