= Gustav Parker Hibbett =

American poet

- Born: February 3, 1996 (age 30); California, U.S.
- Education: Stanford University (BA); Corpus Christi College, Oxford; Trinity College, Dublin (PhD)
- Occupations: Poet, essayist
- Notable work: High Jump as Icarus Story (2024)
- Awards: John Pollard Prize; T. S. Eliot Prize (shortlist)
- Website: gustavparkerhibbett.com

Gustav Parker Hibbett is an American poet and essayist. Their debut poetry collection, High Jump as Icarus Story was published by Banshee Press in 2024. The collection was shortlisted for the 2024 T. S. Eliot Prize, and won the 2025 John Pollard Prize as well as co-winning the Munster Literature Centre's Southword Debut Poetry Collection Award. Their poem “Quickly and Quietly” was highly commended for the 2024 Forward Prize.

== Early life and education ==
Hibbett was born in California and raised in Albuquerque, New Mexico. They attended Albuquerque Academy where they excelled in high jump. Hibbett earned a BA in English from Stanford University. During their undergraduate studies they spent two terms at the University of Oxford.

Hibbett subsequently attended the University of Alabama, in pursuit of an MFA in Creative Writing. Feeling dissatisfied with the program, they left after two years without taking their degree. They are currently a PhD candidate in Literary Practice at Trinity College Dublin.

== Writing ==
Hibbett’s writing has appeared in The London Magazine, Guernica, and Poetry Ireland Review, as well as in anthologies, including Romance Options: Love Poems for Today (Dedalus Press, 2022) and fourteen poems: queer poetry anthology (fourteen poems, 2023). They were a 2023 “Featured Emerging Poet” in 32 Poems and a 2024 finalist for The Adroit Journal’s Gregory Djanikian Scholarship in Poetry. As of 2025 they are a writer-in-residence at Temple Bar Gallery and Studios.

=== High Jump as Icarus Story ===
Hibbett’s debut collection High Jump as Icarus Story was published by Banshee Press in 2024, edited by Irish poet Jessica Traynor. In a review for The Poetry Society, Orla Davey observed

Hibbett’s debut collection charts the heights and depths of identity formation in contemporary America through a poetic diaspora of the mythic and modern. Our athletic speaker also embodies the mythological Icarus, who plunged into the sea after daring to fly too close to the sun. Yet in the face of failure and oppression, our high-jumper continually rises again, forging a blazing existence that redefines masculinity, race, and sexuality. Ambitious in form and triumphant in execution, this collection reminds us that failing and falling are also opportunities for resurrection and redemption.

American poet Richie Hofmann praised the collection, noting “High Jump as Icarus Story is a radiant book of flight and triumph, equally at home in myth and in our dilapidated world. Coming of age, coming into desire, forging a self in life and on the page – these are the poem’s transformations. ‘If paradigms don’t fit,’ Gustav Parker Hibbett writes, ‘it’s okay to customize them.’ Their debut collection is persuasive, original, and glorious.”

English poet Seán Hewitt offered similar praise, writing "Stylish, tender, playful and rigorous all at once, in this collection Gustav Parker Hibbett proves themselves to be one of our most compelling new voices.”

== Personal life ==
Hibbett is nonbinary and uses they/them pronouns. They currently live in Dublin, Ireland with their partner, Abbie.

== Awards and recognition ==
Year	Work	Award	Result	Ref
2021	"Endurance"	Terry Tempest Williams Creative Nonfiction Prize	Runner-up	
2024	"Quickly and Quietly"	Forward Prizes for Poetry	Longlisted	
2024	High Jump as Icarus Story	T. S. Eliot Prize	Shortlisted	
2025	High Jump as Icarus Story	John Pollard Foundation International Poetry Prize	Won	
2025	High Jump as Icarus Story	Farmgate Café National Poetry Award	Shortlisted	
2025	High Jump as Icarus Story	Southword Debut Poetry Collection Award	Won	
2025	High Jump as Icarus Story	Seamus Heaney First Collection Poetry Prize	Shortlisted	
