= Leo Boix =

Argentine-British poet, translator and journalist

Leo Boix FRSL
- Born: Argentina
- Occupations: Poet, translator and journalist
- Awards: Bart Wolffe Poetry Prize Award; Keats-Shelley Prize for Poetry

Leo Boix is an Argentine-British poet, translator and journalist based in the UK. He is the author of two English collections: Ballad of a Happy Immigrant (Chatto & Windus, 2021), a Poetry Book Society Wild Card Choice, and Southernmost: Sonnets (Chatto & Windus, 2025), shortlisted for the Forward Prizes for Poetry 2026 in the Best Collection Category, and selected Poetry Book of the Year by The Guardian, The Daily Telegraph and The Week. He is the author of two Spanish-language collections, Un lugar propio (2015) and Mar de noche (2017). Boix is the editor and lead translator of Hemisferio Cuir: An Anthology of Young Queer Latina American Poetry (Fourteen Publishing, 2025), the first comprehensive bilingual anthology of queer poetry from Latin America. Boix has won the Bart Wolffe Poetry Prize Award, the Keats-Shelley Prize for Poetry and a PEN Award.

Boix was elected a Fellow of the Royal Society of Literature in 2026.

== Biography ==
Boix was born in Argentina and moved to the UK at the age of 20.

== Writing ==
In 2021, Boix's debut English collection, Ballad of a Happy Immigrant (Chatto & Windus, 2021), was selected by the Poetry Book Society as Wild Card Choice for Summer. Boix's poetry has been included in several anthologies, including Ten: Poets of the New Generation (Bloodaxe, 2017), Why Poetry? (Verve Poetry Press, 2018), Un Nuevo Sol: British Latinx Writers (Flipped Eye, 2019), 100 Poems To Save The Earth (Seren, 2021) and The Best New British and Irish Poets Anthology 2019–2020 (The Black Group Press, 2021). His poetry was also published in magazines and journals such as Poetry, The Poetry Review, Modern Poetry in Translation, PNReview, The Rialto, Litro, Magma, Brittle Star, Letras Libres, South Bank Poetry, Morning Star and The Laurel Review.

He co-directs Invisible Presence, a scheme to nurture young Latinx poets in the UK. Boix received the Bart Wolffe Poetry Prize Award in 2018 and the Keats-Shelly Prize in 2019. Since 2021, he has been a mentor on the Ledbury Poetry Critics scheme as part of the Centre for New and International Writing, University of Liverpool.

Boix was mentored on The Complete Works poets of colour mentoring scheme initiated by Bernardine Evaristo to redress representational invisibility. The scheme (2007–2017) was directed by Dr Nathalie Teitler, during which time 30 poets were mentored.

== Awards and honours ==
- 2018: Bart Wolffe Poetry Prize Award
- 2019: Keats-Shelley Prize
- 2021: The Charles Causley International Poetry Competition (Second Prize)
- 2021: Selected for Wild Card Choice for Summer by the Poetry Book Society
- 2026: Fellow of the Royal Society of Literature
