= Cate Parish =

American poet

Cate Parish is an American poet.

== Life ==
Her work has appeared in Stand, Orbis, Other Poetry, PN Review The Rialto The North The London Magazine Poetry London Gairfish The Observer The Times Literary Supplement The Boston Phoenix Poetry Review, and in The Independent.

Parish lives in Kent, England and works as a teacher.

== Awards ==
- 1997 Tabla Poetry Competition
- 1999 Keats-Shelley Prize for Poetry
- 1998 Stand Magazine 2nd International Poetry Competition

== Works ==
- "Everything is Possible", The Oscars Press Website Anthology
- "Without Them", Thumbscrew, No 16 - Summer 2000
- Blue wolves & other poems. Flarestack. 1998. ISBN 978-1-900397-19-3.

=== Anthologies ===
- Rosemary Palmeira, ed. (1990). In the gold of flesh: poems of birth and motherhood. Women's Press. ISBN 978-0-7043-4234-7.
- Christina Dunhill, ed. (1994). As Girls Could Boast: Poetry by women. Oscars Press. ISBN 1-872668-03-8.
- 'Riding Pillion' Poetry Business Anthology 1994 ISBN 1 869961 46 3
- Virago New Poets, Melanie Silgardo, Janet Beck Eds, Virago, 1993, ISBN 978-1-85381-585-0
- New Writing 4, A. S. Byatt and Alan Hollinghurst Ed, Vintage, 1995
- 'How Words See' 1998 Occasional Works, Menlo Park, CA 94026 USA
