= Patrick Errington =

Scottish poet, translator, and researcher

Patrick James Errington (born 1989) is a Canadian-Scottish poet, translator, and researcher. He is currently a Lecturer and UKRI Future Leaders Fellow at the University of Edinburgh.

== Education ==
Errington received his BA in English Literature from the University of Alberta, where he studied with Nobel laureate Derek Walcott. He completed his MFA in Creative Writing (Poetry) and Literary Translation from Columbia University in 2015 and his PhD in Literary Theory from the University of St Andrews.

== Writing and translation ==
Errington is the author of the poetry collection, the swailing, published by McGill-Queens University Press in 2023, which won the John Pollard Foundation International Poetry Prize from Trinity College Dublin and was shortlisted for Poetry Book of the Year in the Scottish National Book Awards. His poems have received awards including the RBC Bronwen Wallace Award from the Writers' Trust of Canada, the Callan Gordon Award from the Scottish Book Trust, among others. His French co-translation of English musician PJ Harvey's first poetry book The Hollow of the Hand (French, Au creux de la main) was published in 2017.

== Research ==
Errington's research is described as 'transdisciplinary', spanning fields such as literary theory, creative writing, cognitive psychology, education, and neuroaesthetics. In 2025, he was awarded a Future Leaders Fellowship from UK Research and Innovation.

== Bibliography ==
=== Poetry ===
- the swailing. McGill-Queens University Press, 2023. ISBN 978-0-2280-1675-5
- Glean. Oxford Brookes University Press, 2018. ISBN 978-1-9997412-2-8

=== Translations ===
- Au creux de la main. L'Age d'Homme, 2017. ISBN 978-2-8251-4651-4
