= Siân Melangell Dafydd =

Welsh novelist, poet and translator

- Born: April 28, 1977 (age 49)
- Occupations: Novelist, Poet, Translator

Siân Melangell Dafydd (born 28 April 1977) is a Welsh novelist, poet and translator. In 2009 she won the National Eisteddfod Literature Medal for her first novel, Y Trydydd Peth (The Third Thing, Gomer, 2009). For six years she worked as the co-editor of literary review Taliesin and Y Neuadd. Since 2001, she practices yoga in order to access greater creativity, directing workshops about yoga and writing across Europe. She teaches Creative Writing at the American University of Paris, and is a course leader for a Master of Research degree in Transnational Creative Writing for Bath Spa University. She's known for working with foreign-language writers (namely those who write in Indian languages and minority UK and international languages), such as Malayalam poet Anita Thampi, with whom she wrote a three-language poetry compilation, Dŵr Arall (Different Water). She often works together with other artists' works, such as Aomori (a project by Sioned Huws) and Ancestral Houses: The Lost Mansions of Wales (co-written with the photographer Paul White and the poet Damian Walford Davies).
