= Jason Walford Davies =

Welsh poet & literary critic (born 1971)

- Born: 1971 (age 54–55); Aberystwyth
- Occupations: Lecturer; writer
- Parent: Hazel Walford Davies (mother)

Academic background
- Education: University of Oxford; University of Wales, Bangor

Academic work
- Discipline: English literary studies
- Sub-discipline: Welsh literature in English
- Institutions: Bangor University
- Main interests: The works of R. S. Thomas
- Writing career
- Language: English; Welsh
- Genres: Poetry; literary criticism
- Notable works: Gororau'r Iaith (2003); Egni (2004)
- Notable awards: National Eisteddfod Crown (2004)

Professor Jason Walford Davies (born 1971 in Aberystwyth) is a Welsh literary scholar and poet. He is an expert on the works of R. S. Thomas. As a poet, he is known for winning the Crown at the National Eisteddfod in 2004.

== Academic career ==
Davies was educated at the University of Oxford and the University of Wales, Bangor (now Bangor University). He has lectured at Bangor since graduating with his degree in Welsh in 1993. He is co-director of the university's R. S. Thomas Research centre.

== Literary career ==
Davies won the Crown at the 2004 National Eisteddfod for his poem Egni. In the same year, his critical study, Gororau'r Iaith: R. S. Thomas a'r Traddodiad Llenyddol Cymraeg [English: The Borders of Language: R. S. Thomas and the Welsh literary tradition], was shortlisted for Wales Book of the Year.

In 2012, he was one of the recipients of Literature Wales's New Writer Bursary.

== Personal life ==
Davies's mother was the academic and author Hazel Walford Davies (1940–2025). He has a twin brother, Damian Walford Davies.

== Publications ==
=== Poetry ===
- Egni [English: Energy]. In "Cyfansoddiadau a Beirniadaethau: Eisteddfod Genedlaetho Cymru Casnewydd a'r Cylch 2004" [English: Compositions and Critiques: National Eisteddfod of Wales, Newport and District 2004], pp. 22–27. (National Eisteddfod of Wales, 2004)

=== Critical studies ===
- Gororau'r Iaith: R. S. Thomas a'r Traddodiad Cymraeg [English: The Borders of Language: R. S. Thomas and the Welsh literary tradition] (University of Wales Press, 2003)
- Co-edited with Damian Walford Davies - Cof ac Arwydd: Ysgrifau ar Waldo Williams [English: Memory and Sign - Essays on Waldo Williams] (Cyhoeddiadau Barddas, 2006)
- As editor - Gweledigaethau: Cyfrol Deyrnged yr Athro Gwyn Thomas [English: Visions: Professor Gwyn Thomas' Tribute Volume] (Cyhoeddiadau Barddas, 2007)

=== Edited anthologies ===
- As translator and editor - R. S. Thomas: Autobiographies (J. M. Dent, 1997).
- With Anthony Brown - R.S. Thomas: Uncollected Poems (Bloodaxe Books, 2013)
- With Anthony Brown - Too Brave to Dream: Encounters with Modern Art (Bloodaxe Books, 2016)

== Media appearances ==
| Year | Programme/Series | Channel/Network | Role | Note/Refs |
|---|---|---|---|---|
| 1999 | Croma | S4C | Interviewer | An extended interview with R. S. Thomas; re-broadcast in 2013. |
| 2006 | Cymru a’r Chwyldro Diwydiannol [English: Wales and the Industrial Revolution] | S4C | Presenter | |
| 2013 | Pethe | S4C | Guest/Contributor | Special episode on R. S. Thomas |
| 2014 | Pethe | S4C | Co-presenter with Damian Walford Davies | 2014 series - Episode: "RS Thomas v Dylan Thomas" |
| 2015 | Radio Wales Arts Show | BBC Radio Wales | Guest | Episode: "The poetry of R.S. Thomas" |
| 2021 | Dei Tomos | BBC Radio Cymru 2 | Guest | Originally broadcast on 23 May 2021 |
| 2025 | Bwrw Golwg | BBC Radio Cymru | Guest | Broadcast on 11 May 2025 |
