= The Robot Scientist's Daughter =

Book by Jeannine Hall Gailey

- The Robot Scientist's Daughter cover art
- Author: Jeannine Hall Gailey
- Cover artist: Masaaki Sasamoto
- Language: English
- Genre: Poetry
- Publisher: Mayapple Press
- Publication date: March 1, 2015
- Publication place: United States
- Media type: Print (Paperback)
- Pages: 82 pp
- ISBN: 978-1-936419-42-5

The Robot Scientist's Daughter is a book of poetry by Jeannine Hall Gailey, published by Mayapple Press in 2015. This collection, Gailey's fourth, deals with ecological issues, with a specific focus on the potential dangers of the nuclear industry, set against the backdrop of growing up in Oak Ridge, Tennessee, in the 1970s. "The poems that make up this collection move in a controlled way between fact and fiction, autobiography and fantasy, giving readers glimpses into the secret world surrounding ORNL in which Gailey grew up, at the same time as they tell the story of a fictional Robot Scientist's Daughter who was transformed by that world into something other, something monstrous."

== Awards ==
- Won second place in the 2016 Elgin Awards for full-length poetry books published in 2014 and 2015; presented by the Science Fiction Poetry Association (SFPA).
- Semifinalist in the 2015 Goodreads Choice Awards in the Poetry category.

== Reviews ==
Critical reviews of The Robot Scientist's Daughter have appeared in the following literary publications:

- Escape Into Life
- Poetry International
- The Rumpus
- San Francisco Book Review
- Savvy Verse & Wit
- The Seattle Times
- Strange Horizons
- Tweetspeak
