= John Barber (artist, scholar) =

Vancouver-based sound artist and scholar

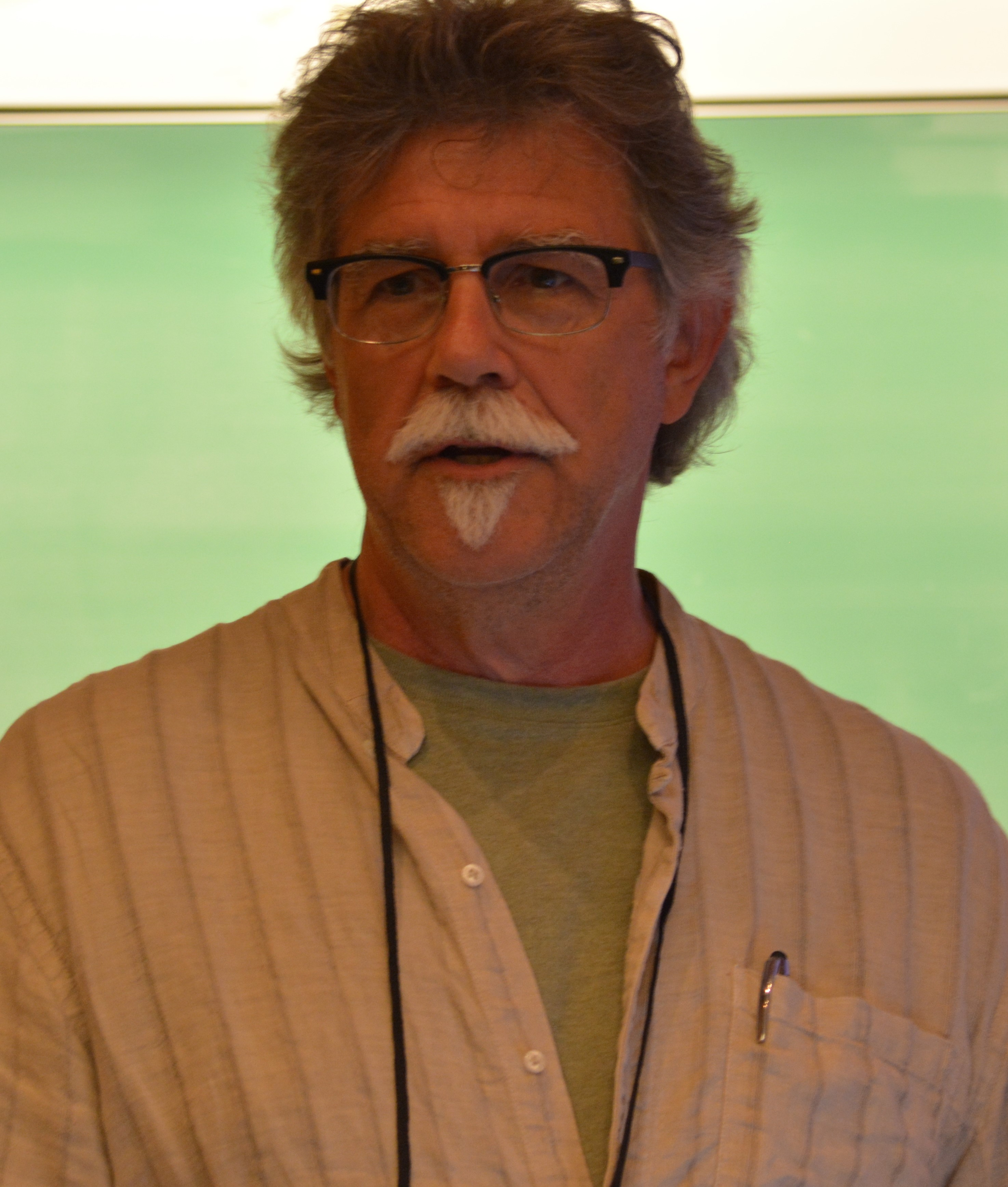
John Barber in June 2014.

John Barber is a digital artist and scholar based in Vancouver, Washington. He is predominantly focused on sound art.

== Artistic career ==
Barber's sound art has been featured in a number of international festivals and exhibitions.

In 2010, Sounds of My Life featured at Lisbon's annual RadiaLx International Festival of Radio Art, and event to which Barber's work returned in 2012 with Tell Me A Story. In 2013, Between Sleep and Dreams was included in events across Canada, Estonia, and Portugal. In 2017, Barber's work was included in the Audiograft International Festival of Experimental Music and Sound hosted by Oxford Brookes University and Brazil's Festival Internacional de Linguagem Eletronica.

In 2017, New Binary Press published Remembering the Dead: Northern Ireland, which pays tribute to those killed during "the Troubles".

== Scholarship ==
As a scholar of media art and digital storytelling, Barber has been published in a range of journals and academic volumes, including Digital Humanities Quarterly, The Mobile Story, and Transdisciplinary Digital Art.

In 2001, he co-edited New worlds, new words: Exploring Pathways for Writing about and in Electronic Environments with Dene Grigar, while he has also edited a book and completed an annotated bibliography on Richard Brautigan.

== Personal life ==
Barber is married to Dene Grigar.
