= Becoming the Villainess =

2006 poetry book by Jeannine Hall Gailey

- Author: Jeannine Hall Gailey
- Cover artist: Michaela Eaves
- Language: English
- Genre: Poetry
- Publisher: Steel Toe Books
- Publication date: 5 March 2006
- Publication place: United States
- Media type: Print (Paperback)
- Pages: 96 pp
- ISBN: 978-0-9743264-3-6

Becoming the Villainess is a book of poetry that was written by Jeannine Hall Gailey and published by Steel Toe Books in 2006. This collection, Gailey's first, deals primarily with issues of women and power. Subjects of individual poems in the collection range from superheroes and spy girls to characters from Greek mythology, such as Philomela and Persephone, and fairy tales, such as The Snow Queen.

Poems from the book were featured on National Public Radio's The Writer's Almanac with Garrison Keillor and in Verse Daily and The Year's Best Fantasy and Horror 2007.

Becoming the Villainess has been taught in creative writing and mythology courses at several universities, including University of Akron, State University of New York at Fredonia, and The University of Alabama.

A performance art piece based on Becoming the Villainess was created by Alley Cat Players, a performance troupe from Florida. The piece was performed at both the St. Petersburg Main Library and at the Selby Public Library in Sarasota, FL.

Poems from Becoming the Villainess were referenced in the article Poems about Superheroes written by Harvard University professor and poetry critic Stephen Burt.

== Reviews ==
Critical reviews of Becoming the Villainess have appeared in the following literary publications:

- Diner
- Fickle Muses
- LitList
- The Midwest Book Review
- The Pedestal Magazine
- Rattle
- Review Revue
- Rhino
