= Isabel Galleymore =

British poet and academic (born 1988)

- Born: Isabel Galleymore; 1988 (age 37–38); London, England
- Education: University of Reading; University of St Andrews; University of Exeter
- Occupations: Poet, critic and scholar
- Parent: Nigel Tattersfield
- Writing career
- Language: English
- Notable works: Significant Other; Baby Schema
- Notable awards: Eric Gregory Award (2017); John Pollard Foundation International Poetry Prize (2020)
- Website: www.isabelgalleymore.com

Isabel Galleymore (born 1988) is a British poet and academic. In 2017, she was co-winner of the Eric Gregory Award. Galleymore's first collection, Significant Other, won the John Pollard Foundation International Poetry Prize in 2020. In 2024, her second collection, Baby Schema, was longlisted for the Laurel Prize for Poetry, and was a Poetry Book Society Spring Recommendation. The same year, Baby Schema was also chosen as a Times Best Poetry Collection of 2024. Galleymore is a senior lecturer in creative writing at the University of Birmingham, UK.

== Early life ==
Galleymore is the daughter of the writer Nigel Tattersfield, who has published several books about the Tyne Valley-born engraver Thomas Bewick. Originally from Portsmouth, and born in South London in 1988, she spent much of her childhood between London and Portsmouth, and has since lived in Cornwall, Birmingham, Massachusetts, and elsewhere.

== Education ==
After studying English literature at University of Reading and creative writing at the University of St Andrews, she completed a PhD at the University of Exeter.

== Career ==
Galleymore is a senior lecturer in creative writing at the University of Birmingham, UK. She has co-edited The Clearing, an online magazine of nature and place-based writing, published poetry on the London Review of Books blog, in Poetry, Ambit, The London Magazine, Poetry Birmingham Literary Journal, and elsewhere, and published articles in Green Letters, Wild Court, Prac Crit, and PN Review, among others.

In 2012, she received a Hawthornden Fellowship to continue her work in environmental poetry and to write further versions after Francis Ponge. Other writers awarded the fellowship the same year were Vanessa Gebbie and David Morley. In 2022–23, she became the Walter Jackson Bate Fellow at the Radcliffe Institute for Advanced Study at Harvard University, undertaking a project that explored the role of cuteness in environmental culture. In 2023 she was awarded an AHRC Research, Development and Engagement Fellowship for her project 'Cuteness in Contemporary Environmental Culture: Developing Ecopoetic Practice'.

As someone feeding her "concern [about the environment] into much of her poetry", her work is frequently understood to be part of contemporary ecopoetics and nature writing. Writing on the topic of beauty, prettiness and wonder, Galleymore has asked "rather than cast them out of ecopoetic practice, could it be more productive to look deeply into them?". Several of her poems have been featured as "Poem of the week" in The Guardian, The Telegraph and Yorkshire Times. She has led workshops, including a poetry workshop on Diglis Island in 2019, been a guest reader at events, including the Sheaf (Digital) Poetry Festival 2020 and the Cheltenham Poetry Festival in 2024, and has appeared on BBC Radio 3 and Radio 4. In late 2023, she set and judged an ecopoetry challenge "about all things adorable" on The Poetry Society's Young Poets Network.

Galleymore has published two pamphlets of poetry: Dazzle Ship (Worple, 2014) and Cyanic Pollens (Guillemot, 2020). The poet Michael Laskey called Dazzle Ship a "first pamphlet by Isabel Galleymore that I wish I'd published." Cyanic Pollens was written in response to her time as poet-in-residence in the Peruvian Amazon. Writing about it for The Telegraph, Tristram Fane Saunders noted that few "young poets examine flora and fauna with a sharper eye than Isabel Galleymore."

Her first collection of poems, Significant Other, was published by Carcanet in 2019. The book won the John Pollard Foundation International Poetry Prize in 2020. Significant Other, which was The Telegraph's Poetry Book of the Month March 2019 and a Telegraph Book of the Year 2019, was shortlisted for the 2019 Forward (Felix Dennis) Prize for Best First Collection, the 2020 Seamus Heaney First Collection Prize, and the Michael Murphy Memorial Poetry Prize 2021. Poems in the collection, called "grounded in nature, earth, science and familiar human experience" and considered "love songs to a much wider range of companion species", including such organisms as the slipper limpet, the drill-tongued whelk, and others, have been praised for "imagistic lyrics", and for moving between "the brutal tedium of reality" and "an evocative dreamscape full of magic and metamorphosis". Saunders suggests "Galleymore might be the first to probe the sex life of the slipper limpet", calling "a sequence of irregular sonnets about spineless sea-creatures" the "highlight" of Significant Other. In Yorkshire Times, Galleymore is noted as a poet of "immense skill at harnessing metaphor to startling effect". The poems 'Difficult Cup' and 'Limpet & Drill-Tongued Whelk', from Significant Other, respectively won The London Magazine Poetry Prize in 2015 and The Basil Bunting Prize in 2016. Several other poems from the collection also received Jane Martin Prize in 2016.

Her second collection, Baby Schema, which focusses on "the cute, the oh-so-precious, the vulnerably itty-bitty", was published by Carcanet in 2024. The book was longlisted for the Laurel Prize for Poetry 2024, judged by the poets Mona Arshi, Caroline Bird and Kwame Dawes. Poet Billie Manning said that "Galleymore zooms right in on the [minute] details (a slug, a doll, a certain cartoon mouse)" in the book to move towards exploring "the big[ger] stuff: environmental care, late capitalism, the decision to have children." Baby Schema, which the poet Jo Clement praised for "attend[ing] to the subjects of extinction, overpopulation and capitalism", calling it "a triumph", was also a Poetry Book Society Spring Recommendation 2024, and was chosen as a Times Best Poetry Collection of 2024 for its "pin-sharp poetry of artificial things — teddy bears, sponges, dolls — that pricks any bubble of complacency or eco-smugness." Generally lauded for its exploration of cuteness and approach to ecopoetry, and noted as "a poetry highlight of the year", a review suggests that the topics in the book "could be made more 'universal' and relatable". Writing about Baby Schema for LitHub after its US publication, the poet and critic Christopher Spaide called Galleymore "a whiz at changing scales".

Galleymore edited an anthology of children’s poems with Fran Long, titled The Bee Is Not Afraid Of Me: A Book of Insect Poems, which was published by The Emma Press in March 2021. In May 2021, AWW-STRUCK, containing a set of visual and page-based poems and critical essays themed around cuteness, was published by Poem Atlas (London), which she edited with Caroline Harris and Astra Papachristodoulou. Its publication was supported by Royal Holloway's Humanities and Arts Research Institute and the Animal Studies reading group at the University of Birmingham.

== Works ==
=== Poetry ===
- Dazzle Ship (Worple, 2014) ISBN 9781905208289
- Significant Other (Carcanet, 2019) ISBN 9781784107116
- Cyanic Pollens (Guillemot Press, 2020) ISBN 9781916060531
- Baby Schema (Carcanet, 2024) ISBN 9781800173880

=== Scholarship ===
- Teaching Environmental Writing: Ecocritical Pedagogy and Poetics (Bloomsbury Academic, 2020) ISBN 9781350068414

=== As editor ===
- Frances Galleymore: Travelling Light (with Fred Beake, 2019) ISBN 9783901993725
- The Bee Is Not Afraid Of Me: A Book of Insect Poems (with Fran Long) (The Emma Press, 2021) ISBN 9781912915118
- AWW-STRUCK (with Caroline Harris and Astra Papachristodoulou) (Poem Atlas, 2021) ISBN 9781838320614

== Awards ==
- 2015: Winner (First Prize), The London Magazine Poetry Prize
- 2016: Winner (First Prize), The Basil Bunting Prize, Newcastle Poetry Festival
- 2016: Winner (First Prize), Jane Martin Poetry Prize, Girton College
- 2017: Co-winner, Eric Gregory Award
- 2019: Shortlisted, Forward (Felix Dennis) Prize for Best First Collection, for Significant Other
- 2020: Winner, John Pollard Foundation International Poetry Prize, for Significant Other
- 2020: Shortlisted, Seamus Heaney First Collection Prize, for Significant Other
- 2021: Shortlisted, Michael Murphy Memorial Poetry Prize, for Significant Other
- 2024: Poetry Book Society Spring Recommendation for Baby Schema
- 2024: Longlisted, Laurel Prize for Poetry, for Baby Schema

== Fellowships & Residencies ==
- Hawthornden Fellowship, 2012
- Charles Causley Poet in Residence, 2017
- Tambopata Nature Reserve Residency, 2017
- Gladstone's Library Writer in Residence, 2021
- Walter Jackson Bate Fellow, 2022-23
- AHRC Research, Development and Engagement Fellowship, 2023
