= Victoria Adukwei Bulley =

Ghanaian-British poet

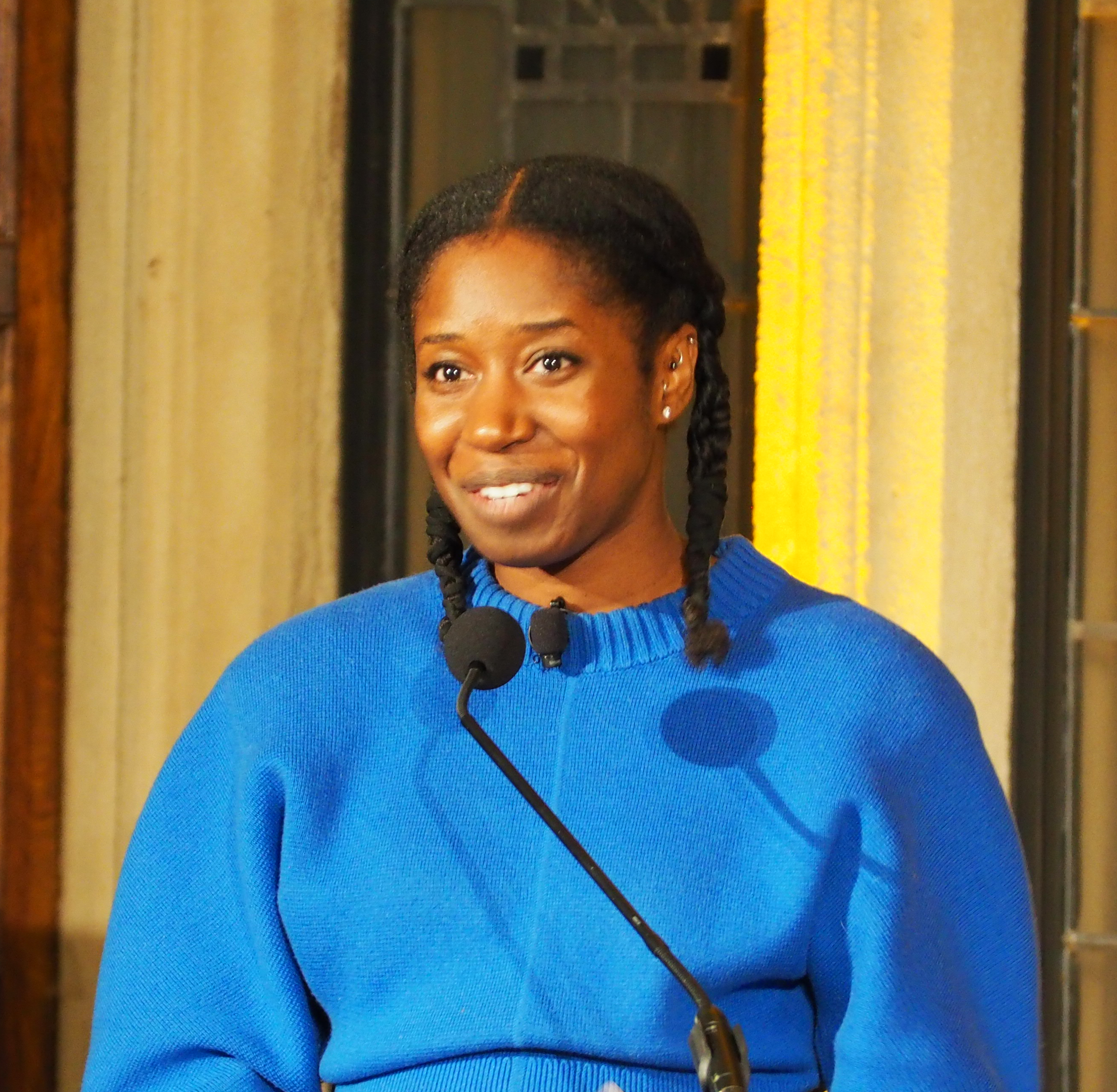
- Born: Essex, England
- Education: Royal Holloway, University of London
- Occupation: Poet
- Notable work: Quiet (2022)
- Awards: Folio Prize; John Pollard Foundation International Poetry Prize

Victoria Adukwei Bulley is a British-born Ghanaian poet. Her debut poetry book Quiet (2022) won the Rathbones Folio Prize for Poetry and the John Pollard Foundation International Poetry Prize in 2023.

== Early life and education ==
Bulley is of Ghanaian heritage, born and brought up in Essex, England. In 2019, she was awarded a Techne scholarship for doctoral work at Royal Holloway, University of London.

An alumna of The Complete Works poetry mentoring programme initiated by Bernardine Evaristo, Bulley has held residencies internationally in the US, Brazil, and at the V&A.

== Writing ==
Bulley's writing has been published in Granta, The Guardian, and The White Review, as well as in anthologies, including Rising Stars: New Young Voices in Poetry (Otter-Barry Books, 2017) and Ten: Poets of the New Generation, edited by Karen McCarthy Woolf (Bloodaxe Books, 2017).

She produced the Mother Tongues intergenerational project, in which poets worked with their mothers to translate their poetry into their mother-tongues.

Bulley's 2017 debut pamphlet Girl B was published by Akashic Books and included in the collection New-Generation African Poets: A Chapbook Box Set, edited by Chris Abani and Kwame Dawes. Karen McCarthy Woolf called it "a probing, thoughtful, and quietly exhilarating debut".

Bulley's first book collection, Quiet (2022), was praised in The Times Literary Supplement for containing "clever and capacious poems" and described in The Guardian as "mark[ing] the arrival of a major poetic talent". Quiet was shortlisted for the T. S. Eliot Prize and won the 2023 Rathbones Folio Prize for Poetry and the John Pollard Foundation International Poetry Prize.

== Awards and recognition ==
Year	Book	Award	Category	Result	Ref
2018	—	Eric Gregory Award	—	Won	
2022	Quiet	T. S. Eliot Prize	—	Shortlisted	
2023	Quiet	Rathbones Folio Prize	Poetry	Won	
2023	Quiet	John Pollard Foundation International Poetry Prize	—	Won	

== Selected publications ==
- —— (2017). Girl B (paperback ed.). Akashic Books. ISBN 9781617755675.
- —— (2022). Quiet (paperback ed.). Faber & Faber . ISBN 9780571370337.
