= Field Guide to the End of the World =

Book by Jeannine Hall Gailey

- Cover of Field Guide to the End of the World by Jeannine Hall Gailey
- Author: Jeannine Hall Gailey
- Cover artist: Charli Barnes
- Language: English
- Genre: Poetry
- Publisher: Moon City Press
- Publication date: September 1, 2016
- Publication place: United States
- Media type: Print (Paperback)
- Pages: 72 pp
- ISBN: 978-0913785768

Field Guide to the End of the World is a book of poetry that was written by Jeannine Hall Gailey, won the 2015 Moon City Poetry Award, and was published in 2016 by Moon City Press. This collection, Gailey's fifth, "delivers a whimsical look at our culture’s obsession with apocalypse as well as a thoughtful reflection on our resources in the face of disasters both large and small, personal and public."

== Awards ==
- Won the 2017 Elgin Award from the Science Fiction & Fantasy Poetry Association.
- Finalist for the Horror Writers Association 2016 Bram Stoker Awards.
- Won the 2015 Moon City Poetry Award.

== Reviews ==
Critical reviews of Field Guide to the End of the World have appeared in the following literary publications:

- Entropy
- Escape Into Life
- New Orleans Review
- Pedestal Magazine
- Rain Taxi
- The Rumpus
- The Seattle Review of Books
- Star*Line
