= Edmund Cusick =

Edmund Cusick (1962–2007) was a writer and academic.

== Life ==
He began his career as a lexicographer for the Oxford English Dictionary, but established it at Liverpool John Moores University as professor of Imaginative Writing.

One of Cusick's early courses at Liverpool John Moores was mentioned on national radio at its inception, due to its focus on fantasy and science fiction writing, which at the time was rare in universities. Due to the subject matter of some of his courses, Cusick was called upon to comment in the press about Tolkien's works, when they were given renewed popularity by the release of the film The Lord of the Rings.

Cusick wrote three books of poetry, and his poems were also published in the New Welsh Review and Poetry Wales. He was a regular visitor, often bringing his students, to Tŷ Newydd. He first attended as a student but later was scheduled to teach some courses there.

Cusick was an associate member of the Welsh Academy and member of the International Association for Jungian Studies, who, reviewing his poems, considered them an application of Jungian ideas to Celtic and other myths. Cusick won a prize in the Housman Poetry Competition in 1998, a Jerwood writing fellowship, and the Keats-Shelley Prize for Poetry in 2005 for his poem Speaking in Tongues.

He has co-edited and contributed to a handbook for writers, and edited anthologies.

== Works ==
Gronw's Stone: Voices from the Mabinogion (1997) Headland Publications (ISBN 0903074974) by Ann Gray and Edmund Cusick
Blodeuwedd: an Anthology of Women Poets (2001) Headland Publications (ISBN 1902096711)
Ice Maidens (2006) Headland Publications (ISBN 1902096940)
The Writer's Workbook (Hodder Arnold, 2000). (ISBN 034076001X) edited by Jenny Newman, Edmund Cusick and Aileen La Tourette)
Poetry Pool (ISBN 1902096983) Edited by Gladys Mary Coles, Aileen La Tourette and Edmund Cusick.
