= John Gohorry =

British poet (1943–2021)

- Born: 1943; Coventry, England
- Died: 17 October 2021 (aged 77–78)
- Education: University of London; University College London
- Occupation: Poet
- Writing career
- Genre: Poetry

John Gohorry (born Donald Smith 1943 – 17 October 2021) was a British poet.

== Life ==
He graduated from University College, London with a BA in English, and University of London with a M.Phil in 1970. He was a lecturer Education in North Hertfordshire 1971 - 2006. He was married with seven adult children and stepchildren, nine grandchildren and step-grandchildren.

His work appeared in The Times Literary Supplement, Oxford Poetry, The Spectator, London Magazine, Critical Survey, Poetry Review, Poetry Durham, Encounter, The Antigonish Review.

Gohorry died on 17 October 2021, at the age of 77–78.

== Awards ==
- 2008 Keats-Shelley Prize for Poetry
- 2007 Times Literary Supplement Poetry Competition Prize for poem "At a provincial zoo"
- 2002 Library of Avalon Poetry Competition 1st prize for poem "Land Measures"
- 1996 Stand International Poetry Competition Prize for poem "Imagining Magdeburg"
- 1991 Arvon International Poetry Competition Prize for poem "Amber"
- 1981 Ver Poets Michael Johnson Memorial Poetry Competition 1st prize for poem "Anaglypta and Corydon"

== Works ==
- Forty-Eight Gates (Dark Age Press, Autumn 2009)
- Imagining Magdeburg (Shoestring Press, 2007)
- Talk into the Late Evening (Peterloo, 1992), Poetry Book Society Recommendation 1992/3
- A Voyage Round the Moon (Peterloo, 1985)
