= Karl Parkinson =

Irish author

Karl Parkinson is an Irish author based in Dublin. He has published four collections of poetry, a novel, and a short story collection.

== Writing career and bibliography ==
Karl Parkinson bibliography
- Novels↙: The Blocks (New Binary Press, 2016)
- Stories↙: Word Portrait of the Poet Dan Jordan (Non Grata, Summer 2026)
- Collections↙: Litany of the City (poetry); Butterflies of a Bad Summer (poetry); Sacred Symphony (poetry); Song of the Fallen (poetry); Back to Normal (poetry); The Grind (short stories)
- Pamphlets↙: A Sacrament of Song (Wumpress, 2011)
- Poems↙: Visions of Natasha (Non Grata, Spring 2026, pp.91-92)

Parkinson's first publication was a chapbook from Wurmpress in 2011, entitled A Sacrament of Song.

Parkinson has published four collections of poetry:

- Litany of the City (Wurmpress, 2013)
- Butterflies of a Bad Summer (Salmon Poetry, 2016)
- Sacred Symphony (Culture Matters, 2020)
- Song Of The Fallen (Blue Lotus Books, 2026)

In March 2022 Parkinson published a jointly authored collection of poetry with Dave Lordan, titled, Back To Normal (Front Line Press, 2022). In July 2022 Front Line Press published Parkinson's first collection of short stories, The Grind.

Parkinson's poem "Visions of Natasha" was featured in Non Grata magazine, Spring 2026. His short story, Word Portrait of the Poet Dan Jordan was published in Non Grata's Summer 2026 issue.

== Reception ==
In 2016, New Binary Press published Parkinson's debut novel, The Blocks, inspired by the author's childhood in a troubled part of inner-city Dublin. The novel was serialized in The Irish Times. Conor O'Donovan writes in HeadStuff that Parkinson uses a "unique narrative" using "episodic flashes of memory, divided into three ‘blocks’ of reminiscence" that correlate to the literal blocks of Dublin's inner-city. Cormac O'Keeffe, writing for The Irish Examiner calls the work an "absorbing ride" that reveals Dublin "warts and all." Aiden O'Reilly writes in The Irish Times that "Parkinson has set himself up unashamedly and without irony as a singer of the human soul in its contrary states of degradation and exaltation."

== Personal ==
Parkinson grew up in O'Devaney Gardens, described as "one of Dublin’s most troubled and dilapidated complexes". The social housing flats in the area have since been vacated and demolished.
