= Keats-Shelley Prize for Poetry =

The Keats-Shelley Prize was inaugurated in 1998 (28 years ago) by the Keats-Shelley Memorial Association. Its purpose is to encourage people of all ages to respond personally to the emotions aroused in them by the work of the Romantics, through rising to the challenge of writing their own poem or essay. Distinguished judges of the Prize have included Andrew Motion, Claire Tomalin, Tom Paulin, Grevel Lindop, Miranda Seymour, the late Lord Gilmour, James Fenton, Stephen Fry, Jonathan Keates, A.N.Wilson, Ann Wroe, Janet Todd, Jack Mapanje, Dame Penelope Lively, Colin Thubron and Salley Vickers.

== Winners ==
Year	Winner	Poem	Winner	Essay
1998	Rukmini Maria Callimachi	"The Anatomy of Wildflowers"	Sarah Wootton	"Keats in Early Pre-Raphaelite Art"
1999	Cate Parish	"Ode to Someone in the Pool"	James Burton	"Keats and Coldness"
2000	Antony Nichols	"Graveyard Shift"	Helena Nelson	"Wherefore all this Wormy Circumstance"
2001	Robert Saxton	"The Nightingale Broadcasts"	Toby Venables	"The Lost Traveller"
2002	Jane Draycott	"The Night Tree"	Joe Francis	"Doubting the Mountain: an Approach to Mont Blanc"
2003	Leonie Rushforth	"Bearings"	Stephen Burley	"Shelley, the United Irishman and the Illuminati"
2004	Isobel Lusted	"Soul with White Wings"	Porscha Fermanis	"Stadial Theory, Robertson’s History of America, and Hyperion"
2005	Edmund Cusick	"Speaking in Tongues"	David Taylor	"Prometheus Unbound"
2006	Martin McRitchie	"The Experiment"	Alison Pearce	"Magnificent Mutilations"
2007	Richard Marggraf Turley	"Elisions"	Adam Gyngell	"Ye Elemental Genii"
2008	John Gohorry	"Lost"	Susan Miller	"Hellenic and Scientific Influences in P.B. Shelley’s Medusa"
2009	Maitreyabandhu	"The Small Boy and the Mouse"	Jillian Hess	“This Living Hand: Commonplacing Keats"
2010	Simon Armitage	"The Present"	Andrew Lacey	"Wings of Poesy: Keats's Birds"
2011	Pat Borthwick	"Lord Leighton brings Arabia to Holland Park"	Priyanka Soni	"Natura Naturata: Shelley's Philosophy of the Mind in Creation"
2012	Nick MacKinnon	"Terrier in rape"	Ruth Scobie	"Mary Shelley’s Monstrous Explorers"
2013	Patrick Cotter	"Madra"	Eleanor Fitzsimons	"The Shelleys in Ireland: passion masquerading as insight."
2016	Will Kemp	"Driving to Work at 5am Listening to Toccata and Fugue in D Minor"	Michael Allen	"A Distant Idea of Proximity"
2017	Cahal Dallat	"Giant"	Hester Styles Vickery	"Keats and Consumption "
2018	Laurinda Lind	"Conscientious Objector "	Tara Lee	"Philosophic numbers smooth "
2019	Leo Boix	"Unholy Family"	Joseph Begley	"The Mind is its Own Place: Torquato Tasso and Romantic Heroism"
2020	Pascale Petit	"Indian Paradise Flycatcher"	Rosie Whitcombe	"Connection, Consolation, and the Power of Distance in the Letters of John Keats "
