= Richard Marggraf Turley =

Poet and Literary Critic

- Born: 2 August 1970 (age 56)
- Occupations: Poet, literary critic

Richard Marggraf Turley (born 2 August 1970) is a British literary critic, poet and novelist. He specialises in Romanticism and the poetry of John Keats, surveillance studies and ecocriticism. He is a professor of English Literature at Aberystwyth University, and between 2013 and 2018 was that institution's Professor of Engagement with the Public Imagination.

== Life ==
Marggraf Turley was born in the Forest of Dean. He moved to Wales at the age of seven, was educated at King Henry VIII School, Abergavenny, and read English at Leeds University.

== Writer ==
He is author of three poetry collections: The Fossil Box (2007), concerned with the urgency of place and origins; Whiteout (2006), co-authored with Damian Walford Davies; and Wan-Hu's Flying Chair (2009), which won the 2010 Wales Book of the Year 'People's Choice' prize.

In 2007, he won first prize in the tenth-anniversary Keats-Shelley Prize for Poetry. His poem, 'Elisions', was written on the competition theme of slavery.

In 2010, together with Professor Reyer Zwiggelaar and Dr Bashar Rajoub of the Computer Science department at Aberystwyth University, Marggraf Turley conducted a 'Valentine's Day experiment' using thermal imaging cameras to determine whether reading love poetry produced distinct thermal signatures on the faces of volunteers.

In March 2012, new research on Keats's ode 'To Autumn', co-authored with Dr Jayne Archer and Professor Howard Thomas, both also at Aberystwyth University at that time, was widely reported. Archival discoveries suggested that the 'stubble-plains' of Keats's ode 'To Autumn' were located on St Giles's Hill, to the east of the City of Winchester, with implications for a new political reading of the poem. The part of St Giles's Hill in question now lies under a multi-storey car park. The editor of the Daily Telegraph newspaper devoted 22 March 2012's editorial to an 'Ode to a Car Park'.

In 2013, research by Marggraf Turley, Archer and Thomas on the importance of Shakespeare's business dealings as a grain merchant for such plays as King Lear and Coriolanus was widely reported. Their work also threw light on the significance of crop weeds such as darnel in King Lear.

Marggraf Turley has written a number of books on the Romantic poets, including The Politics of Language in Romantic Literature (2002), Keats's Boyish Imagination (2004), Bright Stars: John Keats, Barry Cornwall and Romantic Literary Culture (2009), and Food and the Literary Imagination, co-authored with Archer and Thomas (2014), and he is editor of Keats's Places (2018).

He is also author of a historical crime novel set in Romantic London of 1810, The Cunning House (2015).

In 2013, he was one of the three English-panel judges for the Wales Book of the Year.

== Selected bibliography ==
=== Poetry collections ===
- 2009: Wan-Hu's Flying Chair, Salt Press, ISBN 978-1844714438*
- 2007: The Fossil-Box, Cinnamon Press, ISBN 978-1-905614-35-6 *
- 2006: Whiteout, co-authored with Damian Walford Davies, Parthian, ISBN 978-1-905762-15-6

=== Novel ===
- 2015: The Cunning House, Sandstone, ISBN 9781910124109

=== Critical studies ===
- 2018: (ed.) Keats's Places, Palgrave, ISBN 978-3319922423
- 2015: (co-authored, Jayne Archer and Howard Thomas) Food and the Literary Imagination, Palgrave, ISBN 978-1-137-40637-8
- 2015: Writing Essays: A Guide for Students in English and the Humanities, 2nd edn, Routledge, ISBN 978-1138916692
- 2011: (ed.) The Writer in the Academy: Creative Interfrictions, Boydell and Brewer, ISBN 978-1-84384-278-1
- 2009: Bright Stars: Keats, Barry Cornwall and Romantic Literary Culture, Liverpool University Press, ISBN 978-1-84631-211-3
- 2006: (co-ed., Damian Walford Davies) The Monstrous Debt: Modalities of Romantic Influence in Twentieth-Century Literature, Wayne State University Press, ISBN 978-0-8143-3058-6
- 2004: Keats's Boyish Imagination, Routledge, ISBN 978-0-415-28882-8
- 2002: The Politics of Language in Romantic Literature, Palgrave Macmillan, ISBN 978-0-333-96898-7

== Awards and recognition ==
- 2007: Keats-Shelley Prize for Poetry
- 2010: Wales Book of the Year "People's Choice" award (sponsored by Media Wales)
- 2015: ASLE/Inspire-UKI Prize Essay (with Jayne Archer and Howard Thomas)
