= She Returns to the Floating World =

Book by Jeannine Hall Gailey

- Author: Jeannine Hall Gailey
- Cover artist: Rene Lynch
- Language: English
- Genre: Poetry
- Publisher: Kitsune Books
- Publication date: July 1, 2011
- Publication place: United States
- Media type: Print (Paperback)
- Pages: 132 pp
- ISBN: 978-0-9827409-2-7

She Returns to the Floating World is a book of poetry that was written by Jeannine Hall Gailey and published by Kitsune Books in 2011. This collection, Gailey's second, deals with feminine transformations in the personae of characters from Japanese folk tales, anime, and manga.

Poems from the book were featured in Verse Daily, and the haiku "august sky..." won an Honorable Mention in the 12th Mainichi Haiku Contest (2008).

== Reviews ==
Critical reviews of She Returns to the Floating World have appeared in the following literary publications:

- Barn Owl Review
- The California Journal of Poetics
- Mid-American Review
- Midwest Book Review
- New Madrid Journal
- The Rumpus
- Southern Humanities Review
- The US Review of Books
- Web Del Sol Review of Books
