= John Pollard Foundation International Poetry Prize =

Prize for debut English-language poetry book

The John Pollard Foundation International Poetry Prize is an annual award for "an outstanding debut poetry book collection by a poet, in the English language".

The monetary reward is €10,000 and is restricted to single-authored books of at least 48 pages. It is sponsored by the John Pollard Foundation and administered by the Trinity Oscar Wilde Centre of Trinity College Dublin.

== Winners ==
Year	Author	Work	References
2019	Hannah Sullivan	Three Poems	
2020	Isabel Galleymore	Significant Other	
2021	Diane Louie	Fractal Shores	
2022	Gail McConnell	The Sun Is Open	
2023	Victoria Adukwei Bulley	Quiet	
2024	Patrick James Errington	the swailing	
2025	Gustav Parker Hibbett	High Jump as Icarus Story	
