= Hazel Walford Davies =

Welsh academic and writer (1940–2025)

Hazel Walford Davies (1940 – 21 November 2025) was a Welsh academic and writer. She was a lecturer at Aberystwyth University, where she became a professor, and was chair of the management board of the Centre for Higher Education from 2006 to 2011, which led to the creation of the Coleg Cymraeg Cenedlaethol. She was visiting professor of Literary, Cultural and Theatre Studies, University of South Wales.

== Life and career ==
Hazel Walford Davies was born in the area of Bancffosfelen, Carmarthenshire, and attended Ysgol y Gwendraeth before going on to study at Aberystwyth and Oxford. In 2014, she was elected a Fellow of the Learned Society of Wales.

She was an expert on Welsh drama. In 2021 she won the Sir Ellis Griffith Memorial Prize 2020, awarded by the University of Wales, for her Welsh-language book O.M.: Cofiant Syr Owen Morgan Edwards.

Her twin sons Jason and Damian Walford Davies are also academics.

Davies died on 21 November 2025, at the age of 85.

== Publications ==
- Bro a Bywyd: Syr O. M. Edwards 1858-1920 (Cyhoeddiadau Barddas, 1988)
- Saunders Lewis a Theatr Garthewin (Gwasg Gomer, 1995)
- State of Play - Four Playwrights of Wales (Gwasg Gomer, 1998)
- Llwyfannau Lleol (Gwasg Gomer, 2000)
- Now You're Talking: Drama in Conversation (Parthian Books, 2005)
- One Woman, One Voice (Parthian Books, 2005)
- Y Theatr Genedlaethol yng Nghymru (Gwasg Prifysgol Cymru, 2007)
- O.M.: Cofiant Syr Owen Morgan Edwards (Gwasg Gomer, 2020)
