= Flare, Corona =

- Cover of Flare, Corona by Jeannine Hall Gailey
- Author: Jeannine Hall Gailey
- Cover artist: Sandy Knight
- Language: English
- Genre: Poetry
- Publisher: BOA Editions, Ltd.
- Publication date: May 9, 2023
- Publication place: United States
- Media type: Print (Paperback)
- Pages: 104 pp
- ISBN: 978-1950774920

Flare, Corona is a book of poetry by Jeannine Hall Gailey, which has been nominated as a finalist for the 2024 Washington State Book Award in poetry. This collection, Gailey's sixth and her first from BOA Editions, Ltd., "paints a self-portrait of the ways that we prevail and persevere through health adversities while facing an uncertain future."

== Awards ==
- Finalist for the 2024 Washington State Book Award in Poetry.
- Finished third in the 2024 Elgin Awards from the Science Fiction & Fantasy Poetry Association.

== Reviews ==
Critical reviews of Flare, Corona have appeared in the following literary publications:

- Colorado Review
- F(r)iction
- Foreword Reviews
