= Y Trydydd Peth =

Y Trydydd Peth (The Third Thing) is a 2009 Welsh-language novel written by Siân Melangell Dafydd. It concerns 90-year old George Owens, a natural swimmer with a deep love of water stemming from childhood, and a wish to understand the third ingredient that binds hydrogen and oxygen to create water. Learning from an ancient law-book that the river Dee is his by right of birth, he decides to assert his claims by swimming all the way down the river to its estuary at Cheshire.
