= Jane Draycott =

British poet

Jane Draycott FRSL is a British poet, artistic collaborator (sound montages, etc) and poetry translator specialising in Dutch. She was born in London in 1954 and studied at King's College London and the University of Bristol. Draycott's fifth collection, The Kingdom, was published in 2023 by Carcanet Press.

== Teaching ==
Draycott teaches as Senior Associate Tutor on Oxford University's MSt in Creative Writing, and until 2022 was Senior Lecturer in the Department of English and Creative Writing at Lancaster University as well as a mentor on the Crossing Borders creative writing initiative, set up by the British Council and Lancaster University. In addition to her work at Oxford and Lancaster, she was Royal Literary Fund Fellow at Oxford Brookes University 2004-06, as well as at Aston University in 2010-12 and Royal Holloway University of London 2021-22. In 2014-16 she was a Royal Literary Fund [RLF] Lector, becoming an Advisory Fellow in 2018 and appointed as an RLF Associate Fellow in 2022.

== Translation, work in Dutch ==
Draycott's translation work includes a poetic version of the 14th century elegy ''Pearl'' - a Stephen Spender Prize-winner in 2008 - and a collection of new translations of the 20th century artist and poet Henri Michaux ''Storms Under the Skin'' (a Poetry Book Society Recommended Translation) published in 2017 by Two Rivers Press. In 2013, Draycott was Writer-in-Residence hosted by the Dutch Foundation for Literature in Amsterdam, researching poet Martinus Nijhoff's modernist Dutch narrative Awater.

== Audio, music ==
Draycott was previously poet in residence at Henley's River and Rowing Museum, creating a millennium archive of audio interviews with the men and women working on the London Thames. She has recorded a number of her poems for The Poetry Archive and is one of the poets featured in the national Poetry By Heart anthology.

Settings to music of Draycott's poems have included a setting for the award-winning choir Tenebrae by composer Joanna Marsh of 'In Winter's House' (originally commissioned as part of laureate Carol Ann Duffy's 'Carols for Christmas' for The Guardian December 2010), premiered at the Wigmore Hall in December 2019.

== Literary collaborations, film ==
Her collaborative work includes two collections from Two Rivers Press: Christina the Astonishing (1992), co-written with poet Lesley Saunders and illustrated by artist Peter Hay; and Tideway (2002), a sequence of poems written as part of a project with photographer Jaap Oepkes, documenting the lives of London's Company of Thames Watermen and women, with artworks by artist Peter Hay (both collections republished in 2022 in the Two Rivers Classics series). Her poem from this collection, 'No. 3 from Uses for the Thames', was shortlisted for the 2002 Forward Prize for Best Single Poem and features in the Poems on the Underground 2016 series 'London is Open'.

Other collaborative work includes several award-winning sound-compositions with poet Elizabeth James (Sea Green I and II - winner of BBC Radio 3 Poem for Radio 1998; A Glass Case for BBC R3 Between the Ears (1999), produced by Susan Roberts; and Rock Music for LBC radio, winner of a London Sound Art Award 2000, produced by Richard Shannon).

In 2010, Draycott was part of Simon Barraclough's Psycho Poetica, a collaborative multi-media event launched at the British Film Institute for the 50th anniversary of Alfred Hitchcock's seminal thriller, and in 2013 was one of ten poets commissioned by Barraclough for his BFI collaborative project Poets on Pasolini: A New Decameron. Her poem 'Who keeps observance in the fever room?' from Julia Bird's 2015 Beginning to See the Light event at London's South Bank has been made into a film by filmmaker Corinne Silva.

== Poetry prizes, honours, adjudication ==
Draycott's debut poetry pamphlet No Theatre (Smith/Doorstop, 1997) was shortlisted for the Forward Prize for Best First Collection, and her first full collection Prince Rupert's Drop (OUP and Carcanet Press, 1999) was shortlisted two years later for the Forward Prize for Best Collection.

In 2002 she was the winner of the Keats-Shelley Prize for Poetry with the title poem of her second collection, The Night Tree, and in 2004 she was nominated as one of the Poetry Book Society's 'Next Generation' poets. In 2009, her collection ''Over'' was nominated for the T S Eliot Prize, and in 2016 her next collection The Occupant was selected as a Poetry Book Society Recommendation.

Draycott has served on judging panels for a number of literary prizes, including the T S Eliot Prize, the Society of Authors' Vondel Prize for translation, the Edward Thomas Prize, The Troubadour International Poetry Prize, the Tower Poetry Competition (Christ Church Oxford), along with the UK Poetry Society's National Poetry Competition, Foyles Young Poets Awards, and Geoffrey Dearmer Prize.

In 2020 Draycott was elected a Fellow of the Royal Society of Literature and in 2023 was awarded a Society of Authors Cholmondeley Award.

== Awards and fellowships ==
- 1997 Forward Poetry Prize for Best First Collection - Shortlist (No Theatre)
- 1998 BBC Radio 3 Poem For Radio - winner, with Elizabeth James, music by Geoff Pollitt (Sea Green I)
- 1999 Forward Poetry Prize for Best Collection - Shortlist (Prince Rupert's Drop)
- 2000 London Sound Art Award (LBC) - with Elizabeth James, prod. Richard Shannon (Rock Music)
- 2002 Forward Poetry Prize for Best Single Poem - Shortlist (No. 3 from Uses for the Thames)
- 2002 Keats Shelley Prize (The Night Tree)
- 2004 Next Generation poet (Poetry Book Society)
- 2004-2006 Royal Literary Fund Fellow at Oxford Brookes University
- 2009 Hawthornden International Fellowship
- 2009 T S Eliot Prize - Shortlist (Over)
- 2020-2012 Royal Literary Fund Fellow at Aston University
- 2011 Stephen Spender Prize for Pearl
- 2012 National Poetry Competition - Second Prizewinner (Italy to Lord)
- 2014 International Hippocrates Prize for Poetry and Medicine (The Return)
- 2019 "TLS Mick Imlah Poetry Prize". - Second Prizewinner (In the bones of the disused gasometer)
- 2021 Royal Literary Fund Fellow at Royal Holloway University of London
- 2020 Elected a Fellow of the Royal Society of Literature
- 2023 Society of Authors Cholmondeley Award

== Works ==
- No Theatre. Smith/Doorstop Books. 1997. ISBN 978-1-869961-88-6.
- Jane Draycott & Lesley Saunders (1998). Christina the Astonishing. Illustrator Peter Hay. Two Rivers Press. ISBN 978-1-901677-07-2.
- Prince Rupert's Drop (Carcanet Press, 1999)
- Tideway. Illustrator Peter Hay. Two Rivers Press. 2002. ISBN 978-1-901677-33-1.
- The Night Tree (Carcanet Press, 2004)
- Over (Carcanet Press, 2009)
- Pearl (Carcanet Press, 2011)
- The Occupant (Carcanet Press, 2016)
- Storms Under the Skin: Selected Poems 1927-1954 Henri Michaux - translations (Two Rivers Press, 2017)
- The Kingdom (Carcanet Press, 2022)
