= Howard Thomas (scientist) =

British academic plant scientist

Howard Sidney Thomas FWIP FLSW
- Born: 1948
- Died: 2022 (aged 73–74)
- Known for: plant senescence; jazz; science communication
- Spouse: Helen Ougham
- Scientific career
- Institutions: Welsh Plant Breeding Station; University of Aberystwyth, Wales
- Website: sidthomas.net

Howard Sidney (Sid) Thomas, FWIF, FLSW (1948 - 2022) was a plant scientist at the Welsh Plant Breeding Station and later the University of Aberystwyth, and also a jazz musician and composer. He became emeritus Professor of Biological, Environmental and Rural Sciences, University of Aberystwyth.

== Career ==
Thomas studied at University of Aberystwyth and was later awarded the DSc degree by the same university. He started his career in the 1960s at the Welsh Plant Breeding Station in Aberystwyth, Wales. He worked on breeding improved varieties of forage grasses and grains, including oats and barley. He made use of cytogenetic methods. He also investigated how grass leaves yellowed and died, since prolonging active green leaves would improve their value as forage. He collaborated with other researchers to bring new technologies into the studies. His work moved into research on photosynthesis, effects of temperature on grasses and also developing an understanding of the differences in biochemistry and lipid metabolism as leaves died. This work made a substantial contribution to the understanding of the catabolism of chloroplasts and chlorophylls. He began to apply computing to his data from the 1980s as small microcomputers became available.

His work led to the identification of non-yellowing mutants of grasses, subsequently termed a 'stay-green' phenotype, and then more detailed genetic study to characterise their differences from typical grasses. Initially using classical genetics methods but later molecular genetics, Thomas and his collaborators identified a gene, Sid (senescence-induced degradation), the protein product of which stabilised the pigment-protein-lipid complexes of chloroplasts so that dying leaves remained green. A mutation in the phaeophorbide a dioxygenase gene was later identified as the reason for the phenotype. Later, collaborating with researchers in Switzerland and the USA using molecular genetics, functional analysis and cell biology in pea, Arabidopsis, rice and Festuca pratensis, the researchers showed that this gene was one that Gregor Mendel recorded in 1866 that resulted in green or yellow cotyledons.

Thomas held visiting professorships at the Universities of California, Bern and Zurich. Later in his career he was the head of cell and molecular biology research and a member of the management board at the Institute of Grassland and Environmental Research.

He was also involved in public communication around plants, including investigating the concept of plant blindness. as well as promoting links between science and the arts. He participated in the Hay Literary Festival in 2013 in a panel discussion about Shakespeare and sustainability with English scholars. Thomas collaborated with Jayne Archer and Richard Marggraf Turley. This work also threw light on the significance of crop weeds such as darnel in King Lear.

== Publications ==
Thomas was the author or co-author of over 200 scientific publications and books. Among the most significant were:

- Jayne Archer, Richard Marggraf Turley and Howard Thomas. 2014. Food and the Literary Imagination Palgrave Macmillan pp238 ISBN 978-1137406361
- Howard Thomas and Helen Ougham. 2014. The stay-green trait. Journal of Experimental Botany 65 4889–3900
- Ian Armstead, Iain Donnison, Sulvain Aubry, John Harper, Stefan Hörtensteiner, Caron James, Jan Mani, Matt Moffet, Helen Ougham, Luned Roberts, Ann Thomas, Norman Weeden, Howard Thomas, and Ian King. 2007. Cross-Species Identification of Mendel's I Locus. Science 172 592–597
- Howard Thomas, Helen J. Ougham, Carol Wagstaff and Anthony D. Stead. 2003. Defining senescence and death. Journal of Experimental Botany 54 1127–1132
- H. Thomas and C J Howarth. 2000. Five ways to stay green. Journal of Experimental Botany 51 329–337
- P. Matile, S. Hörtensteiner and H. Thomas. 1999. Chlorophyll degradation Annual Review of Plant Physiology and Plant Molecular Biology. 50 67–95
- Fabrizio Vicentini, Stefan Hörtensteiner, Maya Schellenberg, Howard Thomas and Philippe Matile. 1995. Chlorophyll breakdown in senescent leaves identification of the biochemical lesion in a stay-green genotype of Festuca pratensis Huds. New Phytologist 129 247–252
- A Bachmann, J Fernández-López, S Ginsburg, H Thomas, J C Bouwkamp, T Solomos, P Matile. 1994. Stay-green genotypes of Phaseolus vulgaris. Chloroplast proteins and chlorophyll catabolites during foliar senescence. New Phytologist 126 593–600
- P Matile, S Ginsburg, M Schellenberg and H Thomas. 1988. Catabolites of chlorophyll in senescing barley leaves are localized in the vacuoles of mesophyll cells. Proceedings of the National Academy of Sciences, USA 85 9529–9532
- H. Thomas. 1987. Sid: a Mendelian locus controlling thylakoid membrane disassembly in senescing leaves of Festuca pratensis. Theoretical and Applied Genetics 73 551–555

== Honours and awards ==
Thomas was a Fellow of the Learned Society of Wales (elected 2014) and of the Linnean Society.

== Personal life ==
Thomas was married to Helen Ougham and had a son. He died 12 July 2022.
