= Billa O'Connell =

Irish entertainer (1929–2021)

- Born: 25 December 1929
- Died: 23 September 2021 (aged 91)
- Occupation: Entertainer

William "Billa" O'Connell (25 December 1929 – 23 September 2021) was an Irish entertainer from Cork City, Ireland. His career earned him Freedom of the City and an honorary degree from University College Cork.

== Career ==
The youngest of six children born to William and Julia O’Connell, Billa was best known as a performer in pantomime, having made his debut in the Cork pantomime back in 1947. He went on to become a regular cast member of the pantomimes produced at the Cork Opera House, as well as Summer Revels, an annual variety show which ran for over two decades. Speaking in The Irish Times, he recalled a time when there were "seven or eight" pantomimes operating in Cork, and it was one of the city's most popular forms of entertainment. Also regarded as an accomplished singer, he recorded a number of songs for local charitable organisations.

He frequently appeared on The Late Late Show, produced by RTÉ, Ireland's national broadcaster, as a guest of Gay Byrne.

In 2000, Mercier Press published O'Connell's biography, Just Billa, written by Michael O'Connor. His monologues were archived by the Cork City Library in 2012.

O'Connell was also an entertainment manager for figures like Eamon Kelly and Dermot O'Brien.

== Personal life ==
Beyond the stage, he spent 30 years working as a sales rep for Beamish and Crawford.

He was married to Nell Cotter, a dancer. They had six children. One of their grandchildren is writer and academic James O'Sullivan, who works at University College Cork.

He was a close friend of Jack Lynch, twice elected Taoiseach, and Paddy Comerford, a locally famed performer.

He died on 23 September 2021, aged 91.
