= Patrick Cotter (poet) =

Irish poet based in Cork city

Patrick Cotter is an Irish poet based in Cork city. Born in 1963, he has published several collections of poetry. He is currently the artistic director of the Munster Literature Centre.

Cotter studied at University College Cork. In 1984 he was shortlisted for a Hennessy New Irish Writing prize, and four years later, was runner-up in the Patrick Kavanagh Poetry Award. In 2013, he received the Keats-Shelley Prize for Poetry for the poem, "Madra".

== Publications ==
- The Misogynist’s Blue Nightmare (Raven Arts Press)
- A Socialist’s Dozen (Three Spires Press)
- The True Story of Aoife and Lir’s Children & other poems (Three Spires Press).
- Perplexed Skin (Arlen Press, 2008)
- Making Music (Three Spires Press, 2009)
- Moosebeetle Swallow, translations of the Estonian poet Andres Ehin (Southword Editions 2005).
- Sonic White Poise (Dedalus Press, Dublin 2021)
- ‘’Quality Control at the Miracle Factory (Dedalus Press, Dublin 2025)
