= Francesca Rhydderch =

Welsh novelist and academic

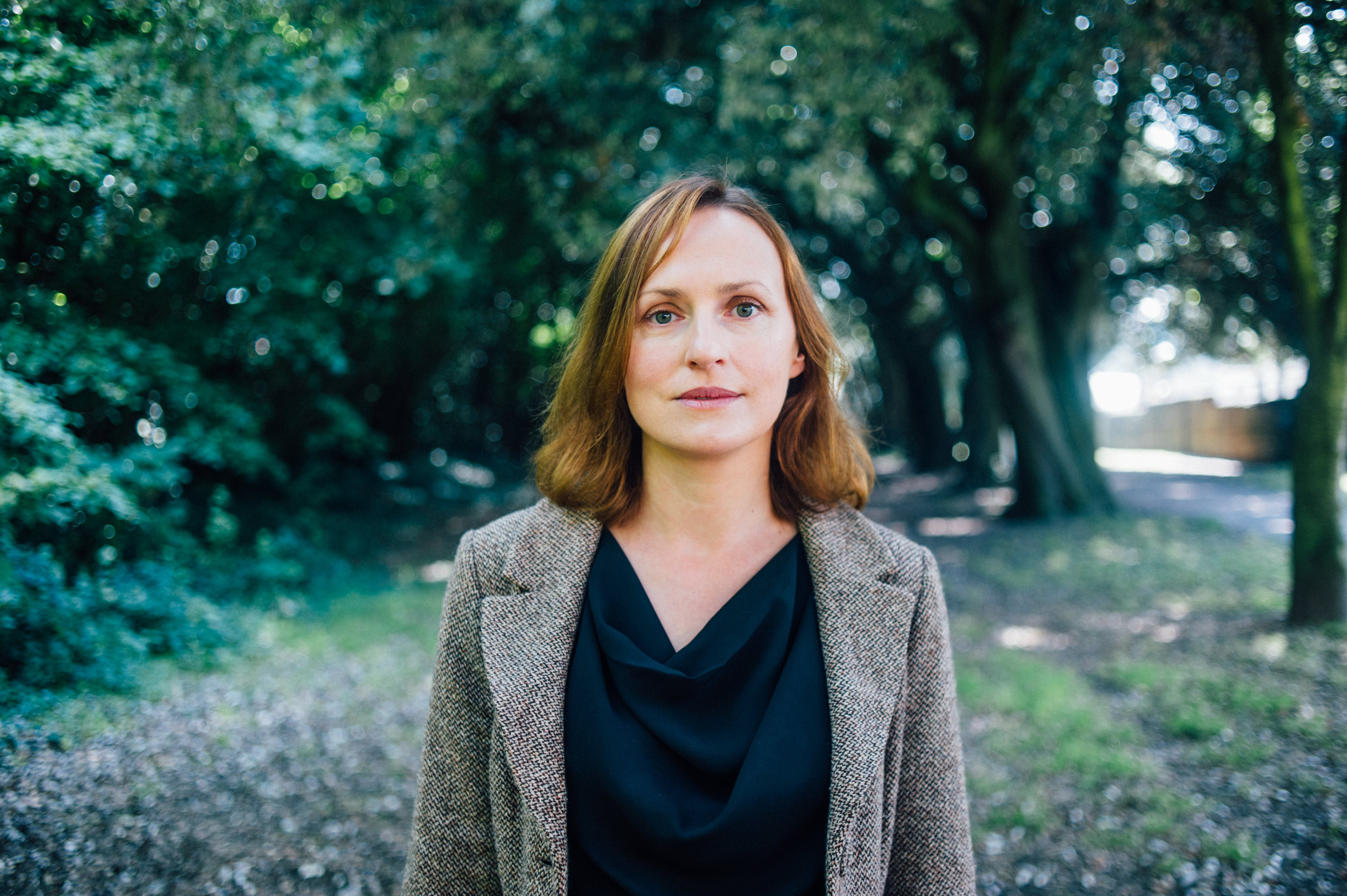
- Francesca Rhydderch in 2014
- Born: 10 February 1969 (age 57); Aberystwyth, Wales
- Occupations: Novelist, academic
- Writing career
- Years active: 2013–
- Notable work: The Rice Paper Diaries (2013)

Academic background
- Education: Newnham College, Cambridge; Aberystwyth University
- Thesis: Cultural Translations: A comparative critical study of Kate Roberts and Virginia Woolf (2000)
- Doctoral advisor: Jane Aaron

Academic work
- Discipline: English literary studies
- Sub-discipline: Creative writing
- Institutions: Swansea University

Francesca Rhydderch (born 10 February 1969) is a Welsh novelist and academic. In 2013, her debut novel, The Rice Paper Diaries, was longlisted for the Authors’ Club Best First Novel Award and won the Wales Book of the Year Award 2014 for Fiction. Her short stories have been published in anthologies and magazines and broadcast on BBC Radio 4 and Radio Wales.

== Biography ==
Rhydderch was born in Aberystwyth. She obtained a BA in Modern Languages from Newnham College, Cambridge, and a PhD in English from Aberystwyth University.

Rhydderch worked as the Editorial Assistant at Planet: The Welsh Internationalist, and became Associate Editor of the magazine in 1999. As the recipient of a BBC/Tŷ Newydd bursary in 2010, she attended the creative writing course led by BBC Executive Producer Kate McAll and novelist Patricia Duncker. She was appointed Editor of New Welsh Review in 2002. In 2015, she and Penny Thomas edited the New Welsh Short Stories.

Rhydderch has been a Creative Writing Associate Professor at Swansea University since 2015.

== Awards ==
- The Rice Paper Diaries was longlisted for the Authors’ Club Best First Novel Award and won the Wales Book of the Year Award 2014 for Fiction.
- The Taxidermist’s Daughter was shortlisted for the BBC National Short Story Award in 2014.
- The Welsh play, Cyfaill, was shortlisted for the Theatre Critics Wales Best Playwright Award 2014.
- In July 2015, Professor Matthew Francis from the Department of English and Creative Writing at Aberystwyth University presented Dr Rhydderch as Fellow.
