= Dublin Review of Books =

Irish literature, history, arts, and culture magazine

- Editor: Maurice Earls, Enda O'Doherty
- Categories: Literature, history, arts, culture
- Frequency: 24 per year
- Format: Online
- First issue: Spring 2007
- Country: Ireland
- Based in: Dublin
- Language: English
- Website: www.drb.ie

The Dublin Review of Books (drb) is an Irish review of literature, history, the arts, and culture.

The magazine publishes long-form essays exploring themes related to newly published books; shorter, more conventional book reviews; blog entries on a wider variety of topics; and short extracts from books that highlight their broader arguments.

== History ==
Established in 2006, the drb launched its first full issue as an online quarterly review in Spring 2007. Founded and jointly edited by Enda O'Doherty, an Irish Times journalist, and Maurice Earls, the proprietor of Books Upstairs bookshop in Dublin, it is consciously modelled on its near-namesakes, The New York Review of Books and the London Review of Books. The magazine aims to provide writers with a forum to develop their arguments and share knowledge in longer review-essays than those found in conventional newspapers and magazines. Along with The Dublin Review, The Honest Ulsterman, The Stinging Fly, Poetry Ireland Review and various other titles, it is one of a number of periodicals to have contributed to a boom in Irish literary journals over the past decade.

Since autumn 2012, the drb has been published fortnightly online, with additional material published between each issue in the form of shorter blog posts.

== Contributors ==
Since the magazine's inception, many notable writers, poets, academics, diplomats, and politicians from Ireland and further afield have contributed to it. Previous contributors have included:

- John Banville, novelist
- Paul Bew, historian and life peer
- Angela Bourke, historian and novelist
- John Bruton, former Taoiseach of Ireland and EU Ambassador to the United States
- Mary E. Daly, economic historian
- Seamus Deane, poet, novelist, critic, and intellectual historian
- Terry Eagleton, British critic and literary theorist
- Marianne Elliott, historian
- Ronan Fanning, historian and commentator
- Joschka Fischer, former Foreign Minister and Vice Chancellor of Germany
- Roy Foster, historian
- Tom Garvin, political scientist and historian
- Nicola Gordon Bowe, British art historian
- David Goodall, British diplomat and former High Commissioner to India
- Adrian Hardiman, member of the Supreme Court of Ireland
- Eckhard Jesse, German political scientist
- Ryszard Kapuściński, Polish journalist, photographer, poet, and author
- Philip MacCann, British author
- Lara Marlowe, American journalist
- Frank McGuinness, writer
- Eiléan Ní Chuilleanáin, poet
- Conor O'Clery, journalist and writer
- Joseph O'Connor, novelist
- Cormac Ó Gráda, economic historian
- Eunan O'Halpin, historian
- Brendan O'Leary, political scientist
- Kevin O'Rourke, Chichele Professor of Economic History at Oxford University and Fellow of All Souls College, Oxford
- Siobhán Parkinson, writer
- Pat Rabbitte, former Labour Party politician and minister
- Ivor Roberts, former British diplomat
