= Munster Literature Centre =

Non-profit arts organisation

The Munster Literature Centre is a non-profit arts organisation based in Cork city, Ireland. It was founded in 1993 to support the promotion and development of literature in the Munster region. Amongst its activities, the Munster Literature Centre organises writing workshops and festivals, including the Cork International Short Story Festival and Cork Spring Poetry Festival. The organisation, based in Frank O'Connor House, also maintains a publishing house, Southword Editions, which publishes, amongst other titles, the literary journal Southword. As of 2025, the Irish poet Patrick Cotter was the director of the Munster Literature Centre.

== History ==
The Munster Literature Centre was founded in 1993 and initially based on Sullivan's Quay in Cork city. In 2003, the centre was relocated to the house where Irish author Frank O'Connor was born.

== Publications ==
The organisation's publishing house, Southword Editions, publishes poetry collections and chapbooks, as well as the literary journal, Southword, which was first issued in 2001. Between 2006 and 2010, Southword Editions published an annual Best of Irish Poetry anthology.

== Festivals ==
Two literary festivals are organised by the Munster Literature Centre, the Cork International Short Story Festival and Cork Spring Poetry Festival. The Cork International Short Story Festival was established in 2000 as the Frank O'Connor Short Story Festival. The origins of the Cork Spring Poetry Festival can be traced back to the Éigse festival, which first ran alongside the centre's foundation in 1993.

== Literary prizes ==
The Munster Literature Centre awards a number of literary prizes in poetry and short fiction, including the Seán Ó Faoláin Short Story Prize and the Gregory O’Donoghue International Poetry Prize, presented since 2002 and 2010 respectively.

Inaugural prizes for the Farmgate Café National Poetry Award and the Southword Debut Poetry Collection Award were issued in 2019 and 2023. The latter is offered to the highest-scoring debut collection of poetry shortlisted for, but which does not win, the Farmgate Café Poetry Award. The winning poet is awarded €1,000. It was first won by Molly Twomey (in 2023). Other winners have included Kevin Graham (2024), and Michael Dooley and Gustav Parker Hibbett (co-winners in 2025).
