= Madeleine D'Arcy =

Irish fiction writer

Madeleine D’Arcy is an Irish fiction writer and editor. She won the 2009 Hennessy Literary Award for New Writer of the Year for her short story Is This Like Scotland? She has published two short story collections: Waiting for the Bullet (2014) and Liberty Terrace (2021).

== Early life and education ==
D'Arcy grew up in Macroom, County Cork. She graduated from University College Cork with a degree in law and subsequently worked as a solicitor in London, focusing on criminal legal aid and then conveyancing, before switching to legal publishing. She returned to Ireland in 1999. She later earned a Master of Arts degree in creative writing from University College Cork.

In 2016, she was one of the census enumerators for that year's census in Ireland, an experience that inspired her second collection of short stories, Liberty Terrace. Between 2017 and 2023, D'Arcy and fellow writer Danielle McLaughlin curated Fiction at the Friary, a free monthly fiction event in Cork.

== Writing career ==
In 2005, D'Arcy attended a creative writing course given by Claire Keegan at University College Cork, which inspired her to pursue a career as a writer.

D’Arcy's first short story collection, Waiting for the Bullet, was published in 2014 and won the 2015 Edge Hill Readers' Prize. In a review in The Stinging Fly, Danielle McLaughlin wrote that the collection was a "juxtaposing of light and dark, of sweet and bitter".

Her second collection of short stories, Liberty Terrace, was published in 2021. It won a President's Award from the Florida Authors and Publishers Association (USA) in 2022 and was Cork's "One City, One Book" choice in 2023. In The Irish Times, Tanvi Roberts wrote that the stories in Liberty Terrace are "darkly funny". John Walshe wrote in the Business Post that "The topics may be stark, from paedophilia to euthanasia, but D’Arcy deals with them in a way that's at once subtle and humane, even when she’s delivering narrative bombs."

Together with Laura McKenna, she edited Cork Stories (2024), a collection of short fiction set throughout the neighbourhoods of Cork city and county by writers who live in or have lived in Cork. She also wrote Dog Pound, a 2014 short film featuring Frank Kelly.

== Published works ==
=== Short story collections ===
==== As writer ====
- Waiting for the Bullet (2014) ISBN 978-1-907682-34-6
  - Translated into Serbian in 2019: Cekajuci metak ISBN 978-86-7034-122-7
- Liberty Terrace (2021) ISBN 978-1-907682-86-5
  - Translated into Turkish in 2023: Özgürlük Terasi ISBN 978-625-8328-26-4

==== As editor ====
Cork Stories (2024) (co-edited with Laura McKenna) ISBN 978-1-907682-99-5

=== Anthology inclusions ===
- Sharp Sticks, Driven Nails (2009) ISBN 978-1-906539-15-3
- Unbraiding the Short Story (2014) ISBN 978-1-4975-9399-2
- Surge: New Writing from Ireland (2014) ISBN 978-1-84717-693-6
- Looking at the Stars–An Anthology of Irish Writing (2016) ISBN 978-1-905002-46-7
- Head Land — Ten Years of the Edge Hill Short Story Prize (2016) ISBN 978-1-910449-38-7
- Counterparts – A Synergy of Law and Literature (2018) ISBN 978-1-906539-76-4
- The Purple House Anthology of New Irish Writing – The Music of What Happens (2020) ISBN 978-1-84840-776-3
- Food, Migration and Diversity – The Many Flavours of the Short Story (2021) ISBN 9798735668923
- The Lonely Crowd (2022) ISBN 978-1-9164987-2-3
- Diversity of Voices – A Global Storytelling History (2023) ISBN 979-8-3936-7825-8
- Urlaubs-Lesebuch (2023) ISBN 978-3-423-21858-0
- Urlaubs-Lesebuch (2024) ISBN 978-3-423-22054-5
- Alles wird gut — Geschichten, die aufheitern und trösten (2026) ISBN 978-3-423-22126-9

=== Short films ===
Dog Pound (2014), a short film featuring Frank Kelly.

== Awards and honours ==
- 2009 Hennessy Literary Awards - New Writer of the Year
- 2015 Edge Hill Readers' Prize, for Waiting for the Bullet
- 2022 President's Award from the Florida Authors and Publishers Association (USA), for Liberty Terrace
- 2023 Cork One City, One Book Choice: Liberty Terrace
- 2024 First prize in the Wild Atlantic Words Short Story Competition
