= Claire Hennessy =

Irish writer

Claire Hennessy is the Irish author of several young adult novels. She was born in Dublin in 1986 and attended Trinity College Dublin, where she was elected a scholar and completed a BA in History and English Literature and master's degrees in Popular Literature and Creative Writing.

She teaches creative writing workshops and co-founded a creative writing school in Dublin. She also works as an editor and co-founded a literary journal in 2015.

== Books ==
- Dear Diary... (2000)
- Being Her Sister (2001)
- Memories (2002)
- Stereotype (2003)
- Good Girls Don't (2004)
- Afterwards (2005)
- Girls on the Verge: the Claire Hennessy collection (2005)
- That Girl (2007)
- Big Picture (2008)
- Every Summer (2009)
- Seeds of Liberty (2014)
- Nothing Tastes as Good (2016)
- Like Other Girls (2017)
