= The Dublin Review =

- Editor: Brendan Barrington
- Categories: Culture, Literature
- Frequency: quarterly
- Founder: Brendan Barrington
- Founded: 2000
- Country: Ireland
- Based in: Dublin
- Language: English
- Website: www.thedublinreview.com
- ISSN: 1393-998X

The Dublin Review is a quarterly magazine that publishes essays, reportage, autobiography, travel writing, criticism, and fiction. It was launched in December 2000 by Brendan Barrington, who remains the editor and publisher. An anthology of non-fiction pieces from the magazine, The Dublin Review Reader, appeared in 2007. The magazine has been noted for the range of its contributors, which includes new writers from Ireland and elsewhere. In his introduction to the Reader, Brendan Barrington wrote:

"If forced to articulate a governing idea behind the magazine, I might offer this: that the essay in its various guises is every bit as much an art form as the short story or poem, and ought to be treated as such."

The magazine is presented "in book form, with minimal design, the writing presented without adornment, without any introduction, explanation of setting, background or even the usual obvious pointers to whether the piece is fiction or non-fiction". Along with The Dublin Review of Books, The Honest Ulsterman, The Stinging Fly, and various other titles, it is one of a number of periodicals to have contributed to a boom in Irish literary journals over the past decade.

Editor Brendan Barrington is also Senior Editor at Sandycove, a division of the Penguin Group.

== Notable contributors ==
- Benedict Anderson
- John Banville
- Sebastian Barry
- Ciarán Carson
- Amit Chaudhuri
- Geoff Dyer
- Anne Enright
- Diarmaid Ferriter
- Roy Foster
- Seamus Heaney
- Michael Hofmann
- Kathleen Jamie
- Claire Keegan
- Derek Mahon
- Patrick McGrath
- Paul Muldoon
- Dervla Murphy
- Cees Nooteboom
- Andrew O’Hagan
- Glenn Patterson
- Tim Robinson
- Sally Rooney
- Colm Tóibín
