= Jonathan Wordsworth =

Jonathan Fletcher Wordsworth (28 November 1932 – 21 June 2006) was an English academic, literary critic and expert on the Romantic era in literature.

== Life ==
He was a great-great-great nephew of William Wordsworth and the great-great-grandson of Christopher Wordsworth, the younger brother of the poet and Master of Trinity College, Cambridge. He was an authority on the work of William Wordsworth on whom he concentrated the bulk of his academic writings. He was educated at Westminster School and Brasenose College, Oxford, in 1957 he became a Fellow of Exeter College, Oxford, where there is now a postgraduate scholarship in his name. He was later Professor of English Literature at St Catherine's College, Oxford. He gave the 1969 Chatterton Lecture on Poetry

His students at Oxford included Martin Amis, Christopher Reid, Craig Raine, Nicholas Roe, N. W. O. Royle, and Robert J.C. Young. He was the Chairman of the Wordsworth Trust (1976–2002) and its President thereafter. He left behind three wives − the literary theorist Ann (Sherratt) Wordsworth, Lucy Newlyn, Professor of English at St Edmund Hall, Oxford, and Jessica Prince; and seven children − four with Ann and three with Jessica including Helen, Giles and Teddy.

His work appeared in the London Review of Books.

== Works ==
His many critical pieces, innovative editions and books on his famous relative include:

- The Music of Humanity (first published in 1969);
- William Wordsworth: The Borders of Vision Clarendon Press, 1982, ISBN 9780198120971;
- William Wordsworth: The Pedlar, Tintern Abbey, the Two-Part Prelude. Cambridge University Press. 31 January 1985. pp. 1–. ISBN 978-0-521-31937-9.;
- William Wordsworth and the Age of English Romanticism Rutgers University Press, 1987, ISBN 9780813512730
