= Unexplained Fevers =

Book by Jeannine Hall Gailey

- Author: Jeannine Hall Gailey
- Cover artist: Michaela Eaves
- Language: English
- Genre: Poetry
- Publisher: New Binary Press
- Publication date: March 30, 2013
- Publication place: United States
- Media type: Print (Paperback)
- Pages: 76 pp
- ISBN: 978-0957466128

Unexplained Fevers is a book of poetry that was written by Jeannine Hall Gailey and published by New Binary Press in 2013. This collection, Gailey's third, deals again with issues that affect contemporary women, such as body image, illness, and how to deal with the limiting social norms and expectations of women. Familiar Grimms fairy tale characters make repeated appearances in this collection, including The Snow Queen, Rapunzel, Red Riding Hood, Snow White and Rose Red. Although the characters are classic, the point of view and tone of this book is both modern and universal. The poem "She Had Unexplained Fevers" from the collection was featured on Verse Daily.

== Awards ==
- Won second place in the 2014 Elgin Awards for full-length poetry books published in 2013; presented by the Science Fiction Poetry Association (SFPA).

== Reviews ==
Critical reviews of Unexplained Fevers have appeared in the following literary publications:

- Amazing Stories
- Escape Into Life
- The Huffington Post UK Edition
- Library Journal
- The Pedestal Magazine
- The Rumpus
- Savvy Verse & Wit
- Wild Goose Poetry Review
