= Jeannine Hall Gailey =

American poet

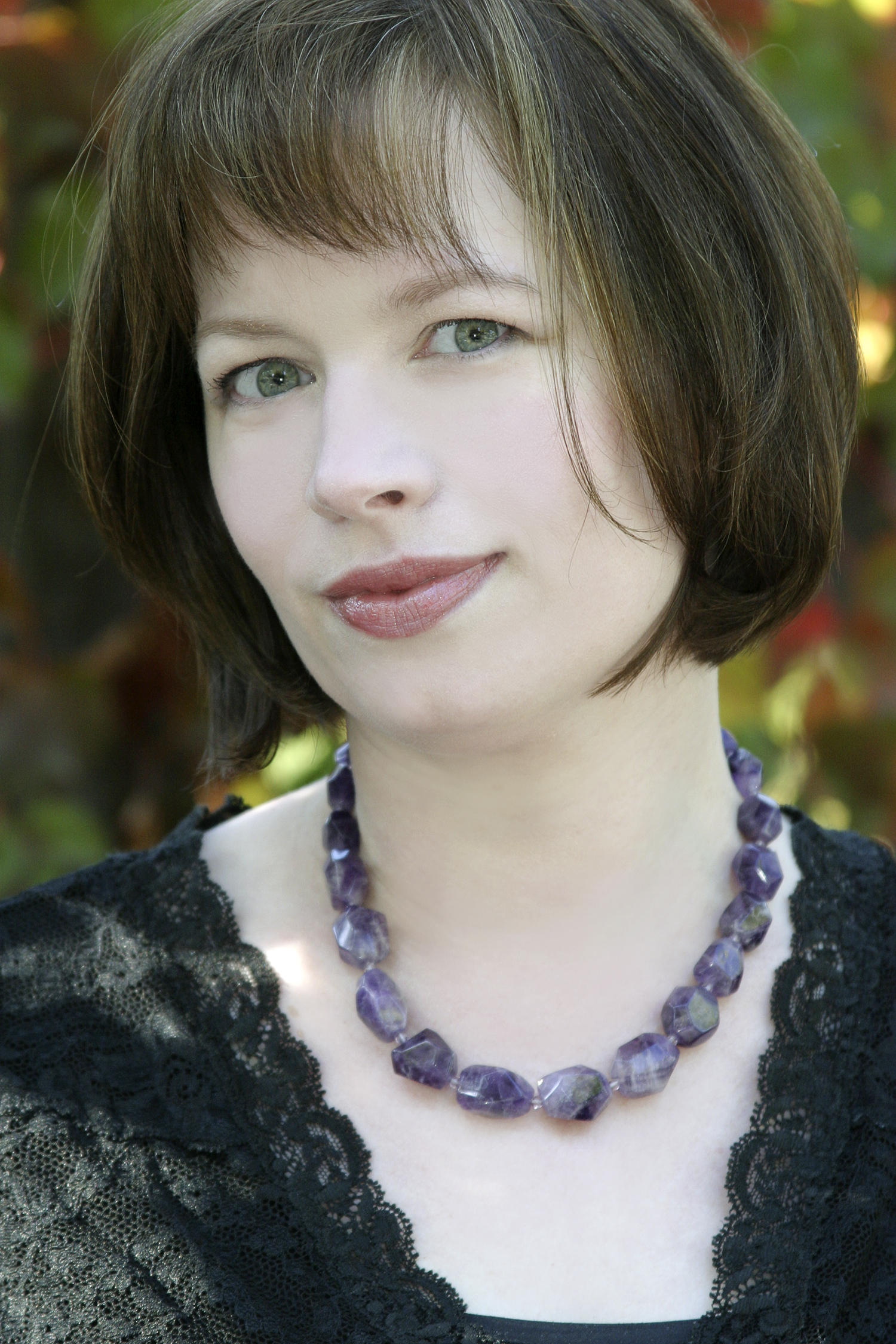
- Born: April 30, 1973 (age 53); New Haven, Connecticut, U.S.
- Education: University of Cincinnati (BA, MA); Pacific University (MFA)

Jeannine Hall Gailey (born April 30, 1973) is an American poet. She has published six books of poetry and two books of non-fiction. Her work focuses on pop culture, science and science fiction, fairy tales, and mythology.

== Early life and education ==
Gailey was born in New Haven, Connecticut, and raised in Oak Ridge, Tennessee. She earned her Bachelor of Science degree in biology from the University of Cincinnati, Master of Arts in English from the University of Cincinnati, and MFA from Pacific University.

== Career ==
In 2012, Gailey was appointed to the position of poet laureate of Redmond, Washington. She was also selected as a member of the 2013 Jack Straw Writers Program. She previously taught at National University and was on the faculty of the Centrum Young Artists Project in Port Townsend, Washington.

Gailey has published six books of poetry, Flare, Corona, Field Guide to the End of the World, The Robot Scientist's Daughter, Unexplained Fevers, She Returns to the Floating World, and Becoming the Villainess.

== Honors ==
- Flare, Corona was a finalist for the 2024 Washington State Book Award in Poetry.
- Flare, Corona finished third in the 2024 Elgin Awards from the Science Fiction & Fantasy Poetry Association.
- Field Guide to the End of the World won the 2017 Elgin Award from the Science Fiction & Fantasy Poetry Association.
- Field Guide to the End of the World was a finalist for the Horror Writers Association 2016 Bram Stoker Awards.
- The Robot Scientist's Daughter won second place in the 2016 Elgin Awards for full-length poetry books published in 2014 and 2015; presented by the Science Fiction Poetry Association.
- Field Guide to the End of the World won the 2015 Moon City Poetry Award.
- Unexplained Fevers won second place in the 2014 Elgin Awards for full-length poetry books published in 2013; presented by the Science Fiction Poetry Association.
- "Introduction to the Body in Fairy Tales" was featured in The Best Horror of the Year: Volume Six anthology.
- Selected by Ellen Bass as a runner-up in the first biennial Phyllis L. Ennes Poetry Contest with an appearance at the Skagit River Poetry Festival.
- Selected as a member of the 2013 Jack Straw Writers Program.
- Appointed as the second Poet Laureate for the city of Redmond, Washington in 2012.
- Awarded a top prize from the Dorothy Sargent Rosenberg Poetry Memorial Fund (2011) for "A Morning of Sunflowers (for Fukushima)"
- She Returns to the Floating World won a silver medal in the Florida Publisher's Association 2011 President's Book Award for Poetry
- Awarded the top prize from the Dorothy Sargent Rosenberg Poetry Memorial Fund (2007)
- Awarded a State Artist Trust GAP Grant (2007)
- Two poems from her first full-length book, Becoming the Villainess, appeared in Year's Best Fantasy and Horror (2007).

== Books ==
- Gailey, Jeannine Hall (2023). Flare, Corona. Rochester, NY: BOA Editions Ltd. ISBN 978-1950774920.
- Gailey, Jeannine Hall (2018). PR for Poets. Kingston, WA: Two Sylvias Press. ISBN 978-1948767002.
- Gailey, Jeannine Hall (2016). Field Guide to the End of the World. Springfield, MO: Moon City Press. ISBN 978-0913785768.
- Gailey, Jeannine Hall (2015). The Robot Scientist's Daughter. Woodstock, NY: Mayapple Press. ISBN 978-1936419425.
- Gailey, Jeannine Hall (2013). Unexplained Fevers. Cork, Ireland: New Binary Press. ISBN 978-0957466128.
- Gailey, Jeannine Hall (2011). She Returns to the Floating World. Tallahassee, FL: Kitsune Books. ISBN 978-0-9827409-2-7.
- Gailey, Jeannine Hall (2006). Becoming the Villainess. Bowling Green, KY: Steel Toe Books. ISBN 978-0-9743264-3-6.
- Gailey, Jeannine Hall (2005). Female Comic Book Superheroes. Columbus, OH: Pudding House Press. ISBN 1-59889-319-X.
- Gailey, Jeannine Hall (2003). Understanding Web Services Specifications and the WSE. Seattle: Microsoft Press. ISBN 978-0-7356-1913-5.
