= Jessica Traynor =

Irish poet and creative writing teacher

- Born: 1984 (age 41–42); Dublin, Ireland
- Education: MA
- Alma mater: University College Dublin
- Website: www.jessicatraynor.com

Jessica Traynor (born 1984), is an Irish poet and creative writing teacher.

== Biography ==
Jessica Traynor (07/09/1984) was born in Dublin, Ireland. She attended University College Dublin where she completed an MA in creative writing in 2008.

Traynor worked for the Abbey Theatre in Dublin as the literary manager. She has also been the deputy director for the emigration museum, Epic.

Traynor is a poet and creative writing teacher. Her first book of poetry was shortlisted for the Strong/Shine Award. Her second was an Irish Times poetry choice of 2019. Her work has been translated into Portuguese. Traynor edited a best selling anthology with Stephen Rea in 2019. The anthology was to raise funds for Movement of Asylum Seekers in Ireland, MASI, to call for an end to direct provision.

Traynor has had works on the RTÉ’s Poetry Programme, BBC Radio 4, Sunday Miscellany and The Salvage Press. She has done a number of residencies including Writer in Residence in Carlow College and Poet in Residence at the Yeats Society Sligo. Traynor became the inaugural Creative Fellow of UCD.

== Awards ==
Traynor has been awarded the Ireland Chair of Poetry Bursary and the Dublin City Council Literature Bursary. She has won the Hennessy New Irish Writer of the Year and the Listowel Poetry Prize.

== Works ==
- Liffey Swim, Dedalus Press, 2014
- The Quick, Dedalus Press, 2018
- Correspondences: an anthology to call for an end to direct provision
- Pit Lullabies, Bloodaxe Books, 2022
