= Raditori =

Vietnamese indie rock band

Raditori is a Vietnamese indie rock band formed in 2018 in Ho Chi Minh City. Originally performing under the name "Radio Story," the band plays alternative rock music that incorporates elements from various genres including tango, Vietnamese folk, math rock, and blues.

The band has released two studio albums: Những Con Người (2021) and Vũ Trụ Nhỏ (2024), along with one extended play, Khung Cửa Khét (2020).

== Formation and early history ==
Raditori was founded by Trần Đức Nguyên from Đồng Tháp province. The band originated during a 2018 Van Lang University "Kiến Xây" (Architecture-Construction faculty) event, where Nguyên and seven friends performed together.

The band emerged from the "Kiến Xây" music community at Van Lang University's Architecture-Construction faculty. Initially performing as "Radio Story," the band experienced lineup changes in its early years. The current lineup stabilized in 2019 when Nguyễn Vũ Hoàng Chương joined as drummer and Huỳnh Quốc Thiên as bassist. Võ Văn Đức, who had been serving as their producer, joined as guitarist. The band changed their name to "Raditori" around this time.

== Band members ==
=== Current lineup ===
- Trần Đức Nguyên – lead vocals, songwriter (2018–present)
- Võ Văn Đức – guitar, producer (2019–present)
- Nguyễn Vũ Hoàng Chương – drums (2019–present)
- Trần Quang Minh – bass (2024–present)

=== Former members ===
- Huỳnh Quốc Thiên – bass (2019–2024)
- Various unnamed drummers and keyboardists (2018–2019)
- Unnamed lead guitarist (2018–2019)

== Musical style and influences ==
Raditori plays alternative rock music that incorporates elements from multiple genres. According to the band, their approach combines "old and new, elements of 60s rock and modern rock sounds."

Their first album Những Con Người was described by the band as emotion-based, with each track representing different human feelings. Their second album Vũ Trụ Nhỏ incorporates genres including tango ("Thú hoang"), ballad ("Làm sao"), Vietnamese folk influences ("Ngắm trăng"), math rock, funk, Nu metal, blues, hip-hop drums, and chamber music elements.

The 2024 album Vũ Trụ Nhỏ draws inspiration from the Vietnamese fairy tale "Thần Trụ Trời" (Sky Pillar God).

== Discography ==
=== Studio albums ===
- Những Con Người (The People) – November 28, 2021
- Vũ Trụ Nhỏ (Small Universe) – 2024

=== Extended plays ===
- Khung Cửa Khét (Burnt Door Frame) – May 18, 2020

=== Singles ===
- Già (Old) – 2018
- Rơi (Falling) – 2020
- Balo (Backpack) – 2020
- Xin thời gian (Please, time) – 2020

== Critical reception ==
Raditori has received coverage from Vietnamese music publications. Their debut album Những Con Người was described as "quite special" and "a bold decision during the pandemic when the music scene had to freeze many activities" by critics. The album was characterized as "a diverse picture of emotional nuances, expressed through a transforming musical world."

Their follow-up album Vũ Trụ Nhỏ received a Rate Your Music rating of 3.52/5. Critics noted the album's "more seamless and sequential nature" compared to their debut.

Saigoneer featured the band in their "Quãng 8" series, describing them as "one of the freshest rock groups hailing from Saigon" and noted their "whimsy and unpredictability." The publication included them in their "30 Picks for Best Vietnamese Music of 2021."

Raditori has been featured in profiles by Vietnamese publications including Saigoneer and Vietcetera. They have been listed among Vietnamese rock artists alongside acts like Chillies, Monocycle, The Flob, and 7Uppercuts.

== Record labels and distribution ==
Raditori's releases since 2020 have been distributed through "12 trái lê", a Vietnamese independent label. Their music is available on streaming platforms including Spotify, Apple Music, Amazon Music, and Deezer. Physical CD releases are available for their major albums.
