= Duy Doan =

American poet

Duy Doan is an American poet. In 2017, his manuscript, We Play a Game, was selected by Carl Phillips for the Yale Younger Poets Prize; the book was subsequently published by Yale University Press in March of 2018.

== Early life ==
Doan was born to two Vietnamese parents who had fled from Vietnam in 1975 and resettled in Texas. In his youth, Duy Doan attended Cistercian Preparatory School. He graduated with an English degree from the University of Texas at Austin and later an MFA in poetry from Boston University.

== Career ==
Doan's poems have appeared in Poets.org, Poetry Northwest, The Common, The Margins, Poetry Daily.

Doan is a Kundiman fellow and the director of the Favorite Poem Project. His work has been supported by the Massachusetts Cultural Council and the St. Botolph Club Foundation. He has taught at Lesley University, Boston University, and the Boston Conservatory at Berklee.

In 2018, Doan's debut poetry collection, We Play a Game, was released by Yale University Press; it had been selected by Phillips for the Yale Series of Younger Poets the year before. In 2019, it won the Lambda Literary Award for Bisexual Poetry. Doan's second poetry collection, Zombie Vomit Mad Libs, is scheduled to release in November of 2024, published by Alice James Books.
