= Howard Buck =

Howard Buck may refer to:

- Cub Buck (Howard Pierce Buck, 1892–1966), American football player
- Howard Buck (poet) (1894–1947), American poet and critic

== See also ==
- Frank Buck (animal collector) (Frank Howard Buck, 1884–1950), hunter and "collector of wild animals", also an actor and director
- Buck (surname)
