= Natasha Al-Maani =

Jordanian artist (1959–2023)

- Born: 1959; Amman, Jordan
- Died: 2 June 2023 (aged 64); Amman, Jordan
- Spouse: Ghassan Zaqtan (separated)
- Children: 2

Natasha Al-Maani (Arabic: ناتاشا المعاني; 1959 – 2 June 2023) was a Jordanian artist. She was active in the Palestinian nationalist movement, producing media in support of Palestinian independence and militant groups. She held exhibitions in several cities throughout the MENA region, and her works were featured by the Institut du Monde Arabe in Paris. She was the wife of Palestinian poet Ghassan Zaqtan until their separation.

== Biography ==
Natasha Al-Maani was born in Amman in 1959. Her mother was Circassian writer Zahra Omar. Her father was a communist from Ma'an who died while she was young. She first developed an interest in painting while she was a child. Al-Maani dropped out of school and moved to Beirut in 1979 so she could support the Democratic Front for the Liberation of Palestine during the Lebanese Civil War. She worked in journalism while in Beirut, and she produced pamphlets during the 1982 Lebanon War. Afterward, she moved to Damascus and then to Tunisia, where she made propaganda posters in support of Palestine during the First Intifada. In 1991, she held a joint art exhibit with artist Latifa Youssef.

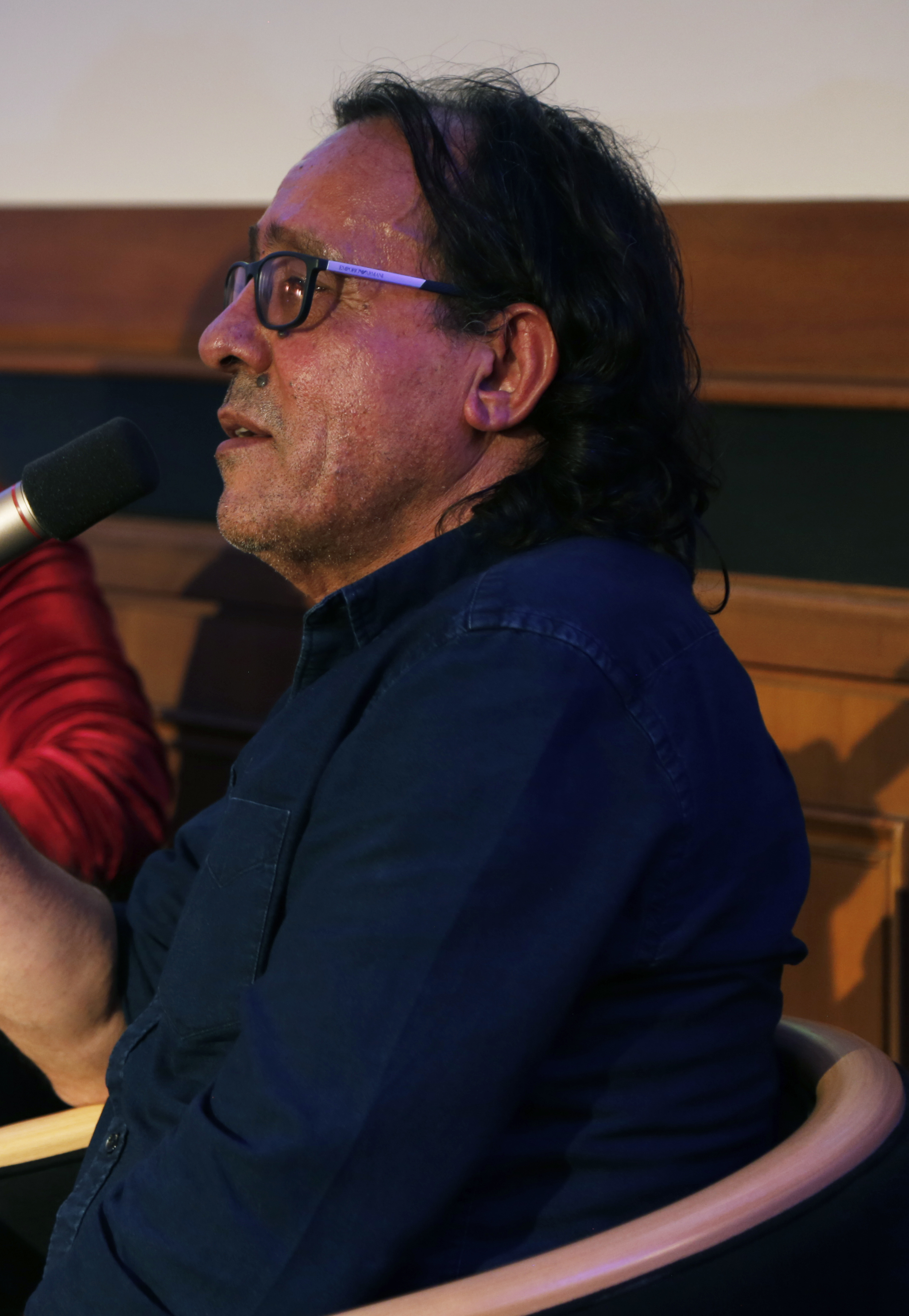
Her husband Ghassan Zaqtan in 2019, whom she separated from.

Al-Maani returned to Amman in 1997 and then moved to Ramallah shortly thereafter. She was one of many Palestinians in Tunisia to go to the city after the signing of the Oslo Accords. While in Ramallah, Al-Maani oversaw the creation of the Mahmoud Darwish Museum until its inauguration in 2012, and she held an exhibition with the WATR Foundation in 2014. Her works were also featured when the Institut du Monde Arabe held its Poetry Festival. Her final exhibition, Al-Mudathirat (transl. The Veiled Ones) was held in the Art and Tea in Jabal al-Luweibdeh. Al-Maani married Palestinian poet Ghassan Zaqtan, with whom she had two sons: an artist and a musician. The couple eventually separated. Al-Maani died in Amman on 2 June 2023, at the age of 64.

== Style and subject matter ==
Al-Maani produced extensive political art to support Palestine in the Israeli–Palestinian conflict. She also produced art about femininity and the role of women in society. Other subject matter that she depicted include sadness, plants, and diaspora. Besides traditional paintings, Al-Maani also created posters, and she created cover art for other works such as books.
