= Michael Casey (poet) =

American poet of Armenian descent

- Born: 1947 (age 78–79)
- Education: Lowell Technological Institute (B.S., 1968)
- Occupation: Poet

Michael Casey (born 1947) is an American poet of Armenian descent.

His first collection, Obscenities, was chosen by Stanley Kunitz for the Yale Series of Younger Poets. Other collections include Millrat (Adastra Press), The Million Dollar Hole (Orchises Press), Check Points (Adastra), Raiding a Whorehouse (Adastra), Permanent Party (March Street Press), Cindi's Fur Coat (The Chuckwagon), and The Bopper (Kendra Steiner Editions).

== Early life and education ==
Michael Casey was born in 1947 in Lowell, Massachusetts. He received a B.S. in Physics from Lowell Technological Institute in 1968 where he took a class with the poet and critic William Aiken.

Casey served as a military policeman in the United States Army from 1968 to 1970. He served in Fort Leonard Wood, Missouri, and in Vietnam before beginning a MS in physics at SUNY Buffalo. With the publication of Obscenities, however, he changed course and pursued creative writing, studying under poets John Logan and Irving Feldman. His master's thesis was an early version of Millrat; his advisor for the project was the poet William Sylvester.

== War poet ==
After graduating college in 1968, Casey was drafted into the U.S. Army. His stay at Fort Leonard Wood, Missouri provided the material and setting for the later book, The Million Dollar Hole; his work as military police officer in Vietnam's Quảng Ngãi Province is rendered in his debut collection, Obscenities.

Casey kept a few books with him while in the military: Alan Dugan's Poems, J.D. Salinger's Nine Stories, and a text on thermodynamics. While in South Vietnam, Casey studied Vietnamese language. He discovered, in a book package delivered for the troops, Donald Allen's The New American Poetry 1945–1960 anthology, and was drawn to the early work of poet Edward Field.

His writing has appeared in the Los Angeles Times, The New York Times, and Rolling Stone, as well as in many literary journals and anthologies.

== Works ==
=== Books ===
- Obscenities. Yale University Press. 1972. ISBN 978-0-300-01548-5.
- Millrat. Adastra Press. 1999. ISBN 978-0-938566-81-6.
- The Million Dollar Hole. Orchises Press. 2001. ISBN 978-0-914061-86-1.

=== Anthologies ===
- Magill, Frank Northern, ed. (1977). Survey of Contemporary Literature. Salem Press. ISBN 978-0-89356-050-8.
- Ehrart, William Daniel, ed. (1989). Unaccustomed Mercy: Soldier-poets of the Vietnam War. Texas Tech University Press. pp. 45–48. ISBN 978-0-89672-189-0.
- Tobin, Daniel, ed. (2007). The Book of Irish American Poetry: From the Eighteenth Century to the Present. University of Notre Dame Press. pp. 582–583. ISBN 978-0-268-04230-1.
- Liebler, M. L., ed. (2010). Working Words: Punching the Clock and Kicking Out the Jams. Coffee House Press. pp. 31–32. ISBN 978-1-56689-248-3.

=== Poetry online ===
- "The Company Pool". Frigate: The Transverse Review of Books. 2001.
- "Bagley's Sign" (PDF). The Minnesota Review. 2006. p. 29.
- "subscribe subscribe" (PDF). The Minnesota Review. 2006. p. 30.
