= Ansel Elkins =

American writer

- Education: Sarah Lawrence College, University of North Carolina at Greensboro
- Writing career
- Genre: Poetry

Ansel Elkins is an American poet and director of the Creative Writing program at Berea College. Her collection Blue Yodelwas the 2014 winner of the Yale Series of Younger Poets Competition. Yale University Press.

== Biography ==
Elkins was born and raised in northern Alabama, where her parents worked as journalists at The Anniston Star. She received her BA from Sarah Lawrence College and an MFA from UNC Greensboro.

Elkins has also been a winner of a Discovery/Boston Review Poetry Prize and the recipient of a 2013 NEA Creative Writing fellowship. She was a 2015 James Merrill House Fellow. In 2025-26 she was the recipient of the Amy Lowell Traveling Poetry Scholarship . Her poems have appeared in The American Scholar, The Atlantic, The Believer, LA Review of Books, The New York Review of Books, Oxford American, Ploughshares, The Southern Review, and others.

== Works ==
- Blue Yodel, New Haven; London : Yale University Press, 2015. ISBN 9780300210026, OCLC 889576934
