= Fady Joudah =

Palestinian American poet and physician (born 1971)

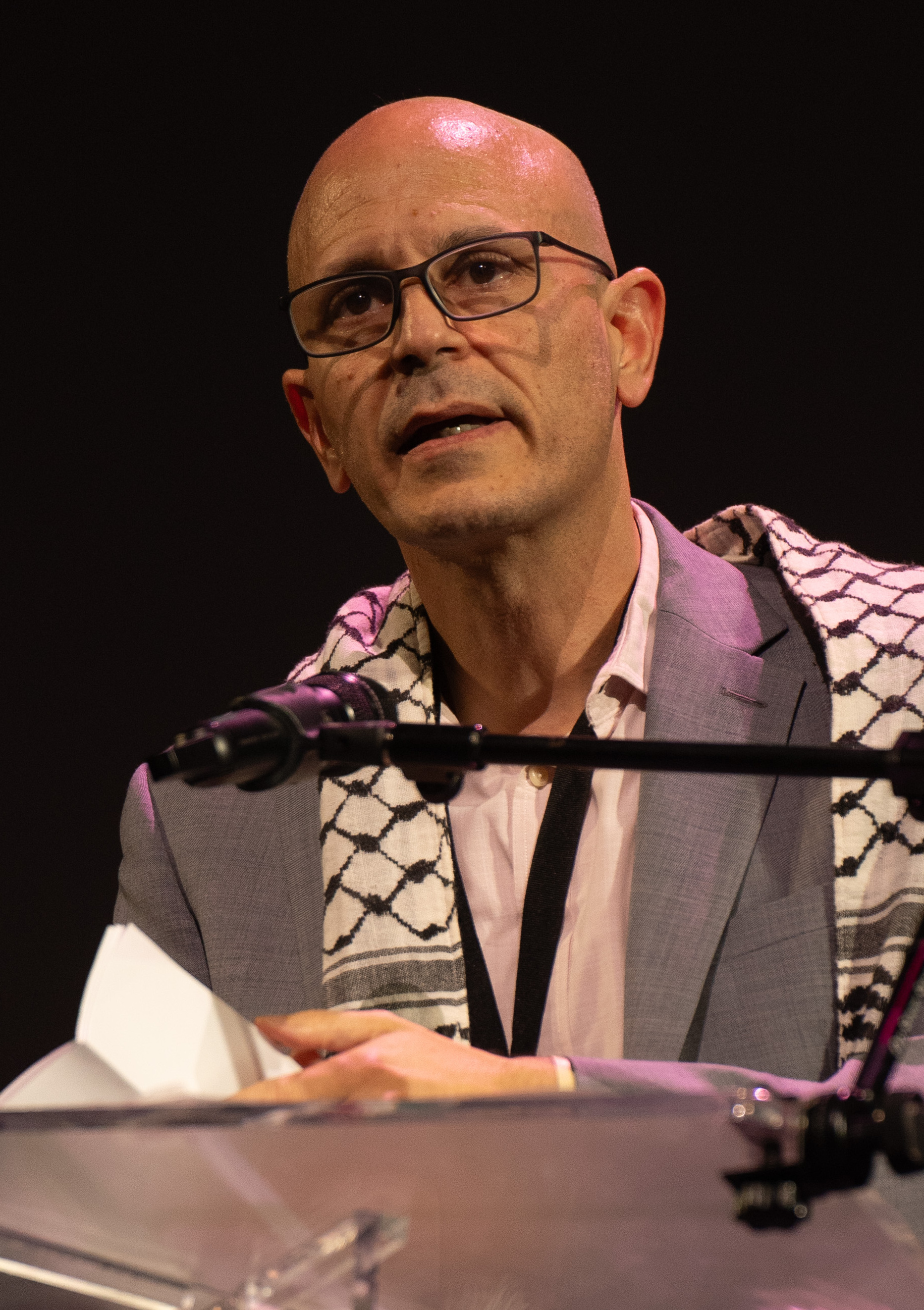
- Joudah at the 2024 National Book Awards
- Born: 1971 (age 54–55); Austin, Texas, U.S.
- Education: University of Georgia; Medical College of Georgia; University of Texas Health Science Center at Houston
- Occupations: Physician; poet; translator
- Writing career
- Notable works: The Earth in the Attic; [...]
- Notable awards: Griffin Poetry Prize; Jackson Poetry Prize; Lenore Marshall Poetry Prize

Fady Joudah (born 1971) is a Palestinian American poet, translator, and physician. His debut collection, The Earth in the Attic, won the 2007 Yale Series of Younger Poets series. He has translated poetry by Mahmoud Darwish and Ghassan Zaqtan; his translation of Zaqtan's Like a Straw Bird It Follows Me won the 2013 International Griffin Poetry Prize. Joudah's collection [...] was a finalist for the 2024 National Book Award for Poetry and won the 2025 Lenore Marshall Poetry Prize.

== Life ==
Joudah was born in Austin, Texas, in 1971 to Palestinian refugee parents, and grew up in Libya and Saudi Arabia. He returned to the U.S. for college, attended the University of Georgia and the Medical College of Georgia, and completed medical training at the University of Texas Health Science Center at Houston. He is based in Houston, where he practices internal medicine. He has also worked with Doctors Without Borders.

Joudah translated The Butterfly's Burden, a collection of recent poems by Palestinian poet Mahmoud Darwish. The book won the Saif Ghobash Banipal Prize for Arabic Literary Translation and was a finalist for the PEN Award for Poetry in Translation. His translation of Darwish's If I Were Another was published in 2009 and won a PEN USA award in 2010.

In 2012, Joudah published Like a Straw Bird It Follows Me: And Other Poems, a collection of poems by Ghassan Zaqtan translated from Arabic, which won the 2013 International Griffin Poetry Prize. In 2017, Joudah translated Zaqtan's The Silence That Remains. His poetry collections include Alight (2013), Textu (2014), Footnotes in the Order of Disappearance (2018), and Tethered to Stars (2021). Cleveland Review of Books reviewed Tethered to Stars in 2021, writing that the collection "does not teach us how to answer any question it poses"; instead, "the poems model a lyrical thinking which prompts the question itself."

Joudah won the 2024 Jackson Poetry Prize which carries an award of $100,000 from Poets & Writers. His collection [...] was shortlisted for the 2024 Forward Prize for Best Collection, was a finalist for the 2024 National Book Award for Poetry, and won the 2025 Lenore Marshall Poetry Prize. In the Lenore Marshall judges' citation, the collection was described as bearing "witness to genocide and expansive humanity".

== Public appearances and writing on Gaza ==
Joudah appeared on Democracy Now! in 2008 after the death of Mahmoud Darwish. In 2021, PBS NewsHour profiled him in a segment on poetry and medicine.

During the Gaza war, Joudah published poems and essays about Gaza and Palestinian writing. In November 2023, Democracy Now! interviewed him in a segment about the deaths of more than 50 members of his family in Gaza and his criticism of U.S. media coverage of the war. In a 2024 interview for The Yale Review, Aria Aber wrote that Joudah had been publishing new poems and essays while appearing on television and radio to discuss the war, and described [...] as a book that historicizes the fate of the Palestinian people and reckons with colonial violence. Joudah said most of the poems in the book were written between October and December 2023. NPR's Code Switch later included Joudah in an episode on Palestinian American writers.

== Works ==
=== Poetry collections ===
- Joudah, Fady (2008). The Earth in the Attic. Yale University Press. ISBN 978-0-300-13431-5.
- Joudah, Fady (2013). Alight. Copper Canyon Press. ISBN 978-1-55659-422-9.
- Joudah, Fady (2014). Textu. Copper Canyon Press. ISBN 978-1-55659-476-2.
- Joudah, Fady (2018). Footnotes in the Order of Disappearance. Milkweed Editions. ISBN 978-1-57131-501-4.
- Joudah, Fady (2021). Tethered to Stars. Milkweed Editions. ISBN 978-1-57131-534-2.
- Joudah, Fady (2024). [...]. Milkweed Editions. ISBN 978-1-63955-128-6.

=== Translations ===
- Darwish, Mahmoud (2007). The Butterfly's Burden. Translated by Fady Joudah. Copper Canyon Press. ISBN 978-1-55659-241-6.
- Darwish, Mahmoud (2009). If I Were Another. Translated by Fady Joudah. Farrar, Straus and Giroux. ISBN 978-0-374-17429-3.
- Zaqtan, Ghassan (2012). Like a Straw Bird It Follows Me: And Other Poems. Translated by Fady Joudah. Yale University Press. ISBN 978-0-300-17316-1.
- Zaqtan, Ghassan (2017). The Silence That Remains: Selected Poems. Translated by Fady Joudah. Copper Canyon Press. ISBN 978-1-55659-514-1.

=== Other contributions ===
- Contributor to A New Divan: A Lyrical Dialogue between East and West (Gingko Library, 2019) ISBN 9781909942288
