= Isabel Neal (poet) =

American poet and professor

- Born: Isabel Ries Neal; Boston, Massachusetts
- Occupations: Poet and educator
- Awards: 120th Yale Younger Poets award recipient

Academic background
- Education: Pitzer College (BA); University of Michigan (MFA)
- Alma mater: University of Michigan

Isabel Ries Neal is an American writer, poet, and educator. She won the Yale Series of Younger Poets Prize in 2025 for her debut poetry collection, Thrown Voice.

== Biography ==
Neal is from Boston. She graduated from Pitzer College in 2012 and earned her MFA from the University of Michigan's Helen Zell Writers’ Program, where formerly taught. During her time at the University of Michigan, she served as a steward for GEO, the graduate labor union.

In 2025, Neal was named winner of the 2025 Yale Younger Poets award, which marked Rae Armantrout's fifth and final selection as judge.

Her writing has appeared in Best New Poets, Michigan Quarterly Review, and the Academy of American Poets's Poem-a-Day. She has been awarded fellowships from the Provincetown Fine Arts Work Center, Vermont Studio Center, and Lighthouse Works. She currently lives in southern Maine.

== Honors and awards ==
- 2025: Yale Series of Younger Poets Prize

== Published works ==
Poetry collections

- Neal, I. (2026). Thrown Voice. New Haven, CT: Yale University Press.
