= Juvenilia (Chen poetry collection) =

2010 debut poetry collection by Ken Chen

- Author: Ken Chen
- Publisher: Yale University Press
- Publication date: April 20, 2010
- Pages: 104
- Award: Yale Younger Poets Prize
- ISBN: 978-0300160079

Juvenilia is a 2010 debut poetry collection by Ken Chen, published by Yale University Press. It was selected for the Yale Series of Younger Poets by Louise Glück in 2009.

== Contents and background ==
Louise Glück selected Chen's manuscript for the Yale Younger Poets Prize in 2009. In her foreword, she stated:

"The miracle of this book is the degree to which Ken Chen manages to be both exhilaratingly modern (anti-catharsis, anti-epiphany) while at the same time never losing his attachment to voice, and the implicit claims of voice: these are poems of intense feeling."

The book is divided into three sections: "the first focusing on my family, the second on break-ups, and the third a murkier, more illegible account of my family’s history," Chen stated in AGNI. Of the third section, which critics saw as experimental, Chen called it "incomprehensible and rips off Wikipedia and Herbert Giles’s footnotes" and his attempt at "chucking New Criticism out the back of the train. I was reading sketchy, deterritorializing books like Michael Ondaatje’s Coming Through Slaughter, Cha’s Dictee, Myung Mi Kim’s Dura, and Bhanu Kapil’s A Vertical Interrogation of Strangers and really admired how they forced you to read invisibly."

Chen stated he and his peers were surprised that the book was considered "Asian American literature"; Chen was "just ... trying to write honestly about my life" and instead considered a wide range of influences beyond, "say, Maxine Hong Kingston's Woman Warrior": "Alain Resnais movies, Louis Aragon, Love and Rockets comics, Hamdi v. Rumsfeld, Ingeborg Bachmann, Chekhov, the romantic voice of Raymond Chandler, and Dennis Potter’s The Singing Detective." Chen then subsequently stated that ethnic identity, as a poet, was complicated: he found that it was generally "understood by the dominant, largely white literary center" but also didn't want to cast off or consider himself "an exception to race."

== Critical reception ==
Publishers Weekly lauded Chen's experimentation with his poetic form and his approach to Chinese American identity, stating he "deserves attention for his daring invention, for the heretofore unknown hybrids throughout his work."

Critics found novelty in the way Chen's poetics expressed intimate topics of love and family. Poets.org said the book "features poems that are varied and anything but formally conventional, conveying a kaleidoscopic intelligence. Poems explore communication, family, and heartbreak in a range of frameworks: dream, argument, novella, letter, monologue." Hyphen saw the book as "fresh and intelligent" in its skirting of tropes typically exhibited in "writings by the descendants of immigrants." Boston Review called the book "a memorable, beautiful-yet-sly, powerful debut" and appreciated how Chen "walks the high wire between deeply felt trauma and poetic artifact." On the Seawall stated observed Chen's writing on relationships, both of his parents and his own: "I cannot think of another young poet who writes so palpably, ingenuously about love."

== Cover ==
The book's cover is a tessellated still from Days of Being Wild by Wong Kar-wai.
