= Jill Osier =

American poet

- Occupation: poet
- Education: Luther College (BA), University of Alaska Fairbanks (MFA)
- Notable works: The Solace Is Not the Lullaby (2020)
- Notable awards: Yale Younger Poets Prize (2019)

Jill Osier is an American poet and 2019 winner of the Yale Series of Younger Poets Competition.

== Biography and career ==
Osier was born in Iowa. Osier received a BA from Luther College and an MFA from the University of Alaska Fairbanks. In 2018, series judge Carl Phillips selected Osier as the winner of the Yale Series of Younger Poets Competition; her collection The Solace Is Not the Lullaby was published in 2020.

Osier was invited to be a James Merrill House Fellow in 2020. She received the Poetry Society of America’s Alice Fay Di Castagnola Award in 2017. She received a National Endowment for the Arts Literature Fellowship in 2007.

== Works ==
=== Full-length poetry collections ===
- The Solace Is Not the Lullaby, New Haven, Connecticut; London: Yale University Press, 2020. ISBN 9780300250343, OCLC 1114283711.

=== Chapbook-length poetry collections ===
- Bedful of Nebraskas (sunnyoutside, 2012)
- Should Our Undoing Come Down Upon Us White (Bull City Press, 2013)
- from (Bull City Press, 2018)
