= John Liles (writer) =

American poet and professor

- Occupation: Science writer
- Awards: 119th Yale Younger Poets award recipient

Academic background
- Education: New York University (MFA)
- Alma mater: New York University
- Website: https://john-liles.com/

John Liles is an American poet, science writer, and educator. He won the Yale Series of Younger Poets Prize in 2024 for his debut poetry collection, Bees, and After.

== Biography ==
Liles graduated from the MFA program at New York University. He was the artist-in-residence at the Oak Spring Garden Foundation in 2019 and 2020. His debut chapbook, Following the dog down, won the Omnidawn Chapbook Prize in 2017.

In 2024, Liles was named winner of the Yale Younger Poets award, selected by Rae Armantrout. Armantrout described his winning manuscript, Bees, and After, as "dense, sonically gorgeous studies of various natural things and creatures, including light, bees, minerals, shellfish and crabs, insects, and the workings (and failures) of the heart."

Liles' poems have appeared in Scientific American and Sonora Review. He currently lives in Fort Bragg, California.

== Honors and awards ==
- 2024: Yale Series of Younger Poets Prize

== Published works ==
Poetry collections

- Liles, J. (2025). Bees, and After. New Haven, CT: Yale University Press.

Chapbooks

- Liles, J. (2017). Following the dog down. Richmond, CA: Omnidawn Publishing.
