= Katherine Larson =

American writer

- Education: University of Arizona, University of Virginia
- Occupations: Molecular biologist, field ecologist
- Writing career
- Genre: Poetry

Katherine Larson is an American poet, molecular biologist and field ecologist. She is the 2010 winner of the Yale Series of Younger Poets Competition and her first collection of poetry, Radial Symmetry, was published by Yale University Press in 2011.

== Early life and education ==
Larson's father worked as a professor of forestry and environmental science; her mother was a fourth-grade teacher with a passion for science. She graduated from Flagstaff High School, Flagstaff, Arizona, in 1996, and went on to the University of Arizona, where she took a Bachelor of Science degree in ecology and evolutionary biology, and a Bachelor of Arts degree in creative writing and English. She also holds a Master of Fine Arts degree in creative writing from the University of Virginia, where she was a Henry Hoyns fellow in creative writing.

== Career ==
Larson's work has appeared in anthologies such as Prentice Hall’s Literature: An Introduction to Reading and Writing, as well as in the journals AGNI, Poetry, Boulevard, The Kenyon Review, The Massachusetts Review, Notre Dame Review, and Poetry Northwest. She has cited Marianne Moore, Elizabeth Bishop, Pablo Neruda and Tomas Tranströmer among her formative influences, as well as Medbh McGuckian, Ciaran Carson and Seamus Heaney from a semester spent studying in Ireland when she was in college. In 2003, Larson won a Ruth Lilly Poetry Fellowship and she is a recipient of The Union League Civic and Arts Foundation Poetry Prize.

In 2009 Larson collaborated with artist Heather Green on The Ghost Net Project at the University of Arizona's Poetry Center. 25 shadow boxes, each paired with a poem by Larson, were constructed from salvaged shrimp-boat wood and filled with flotsam and jetsam as a way of examining cultural and ecological relationships in the Gulf of California, where Larson had lived and worked for six months.

Her first collection of poetry, Radial Symmetry, was published by Yale University Press in 2011. The book was praised in The Independent for "an extraordinary wakefulness, an immersion in nuance that enriches experience", while The Paris Review said: "The natural world has never felt more physical, more alive with tiny movements and infinite textures". Bookforum enjoyed its "measured sensuousness".

In 2012, Radial Symmetry won the Kate Tufts Discovery Award, the $10,000 award given annually to poets of promise by Claremont Graduate University. The collection was also awarded the Levis Reading Prize from Virginia Commonwealth University and the ForeWord Magazine Gold Medal Prize in the Poetry Category.

In an interview with The Kenyon Review, Larson said: "I live more authentically when I write. I pay more attention. I’m more curious. More imaginative. I ask more interesting questions. Writing allows me to approach my life with a greater passion", adding: "When I’m able to spend at least part of my life fully traversing the landscape of my mind, I’m paradoxically able to be more present to the people and the world around me."

Larson works as a research scientist in the field of molecular biology.

She lives in Tucson, Arizona with her husband and daughter.

== Awards and honours ==
In 2010, Larson was selected by Louise Glück as winner of the Yale Series of Younger Poets Competition.

== Works ==
- Radial symmetry, New Haven : Yale University Press, 2011. ISBN 9780300169195, OCLC 765960354
