= Robert Horan =

American poet (1922–1981)

- Born: August 9, 1922
- Died: September 19, 1981 (aged 59)
- Occupation: Poet

Robert Horan (August 9, 1922 – September 19, 1981) was an American poet.

== Life ==
He lived with Pauline Kael in Berkeley, California. He was part of the "Activist" group. He was lovers with Gian Carlo Menotti, and he stayed with Menotti and Menotti's long-term lover, Samuel Barber, at "The Capricorn", at Mount Kisco, New York.

His work appeared in Harper's, Poetry, and Kenyon Review.

== Awards ==
- 1948 Yale Series of Younger Poets Competition

== Works ==
- A Beginning (New Haven, Conn., 1948 )

=== Criticism ===
- "In Defense of Dylan Thomas", Kenyon Review, 1945
