= Yale Series of Younger Poets =

Annual poetry prize at Yale University

- Centennial logo
- Country: United States
- Language: English
- Discipline: Poetry
- Publisher: Yale University Press
- Published: Annually since 1919
- No. of books: 119
- OCLC: 1605127
- Website: https://yalebooks.yale.edu/search-results/?series=yle18-yale-series-of-younger-poets

The Yale Series of Younger Poets is an annual event of Yale University Press aiming to publish the debut collection of a promising American poet. Established in 1918, the Younger Poets Prize is the longest-running annual literary award in the United States.

Each year, the Younger Poets Competition accepts submissions from American poets who have not previously published a book of poetry. Once the judge has chosen a winner, the Press publishes a book-length manuscript of the winner's poetry as the next volume in the series. All poems must be original, and only one manuscript may be entered at a time.

== Rules and eligibility ==
Contest requirements were first articulated in the summer of 1920. The series had already published four books, all written by Yale students, and the judges sought to attract a nationwide pool of applicants. A promotional statement gave the following, somewhat vague eligibility requirements: "Anyone is eligible provided he (or she) is young and comparatively unknown. The age limit is understood to be about thirty." A formal set of rules was adopted in 1924. In addition to specifying page limits and other manuscript requirements, these new rules limited the contest to American citizens younger than 30. However, current rules allow poets of any age who have not published a book of poetry to be considered. Although the contest was briefly opened to any writer of English-language poetry under Auden's judgeship, it has remained limited to American citizens ever since.

== History ==
=== 20th century ===
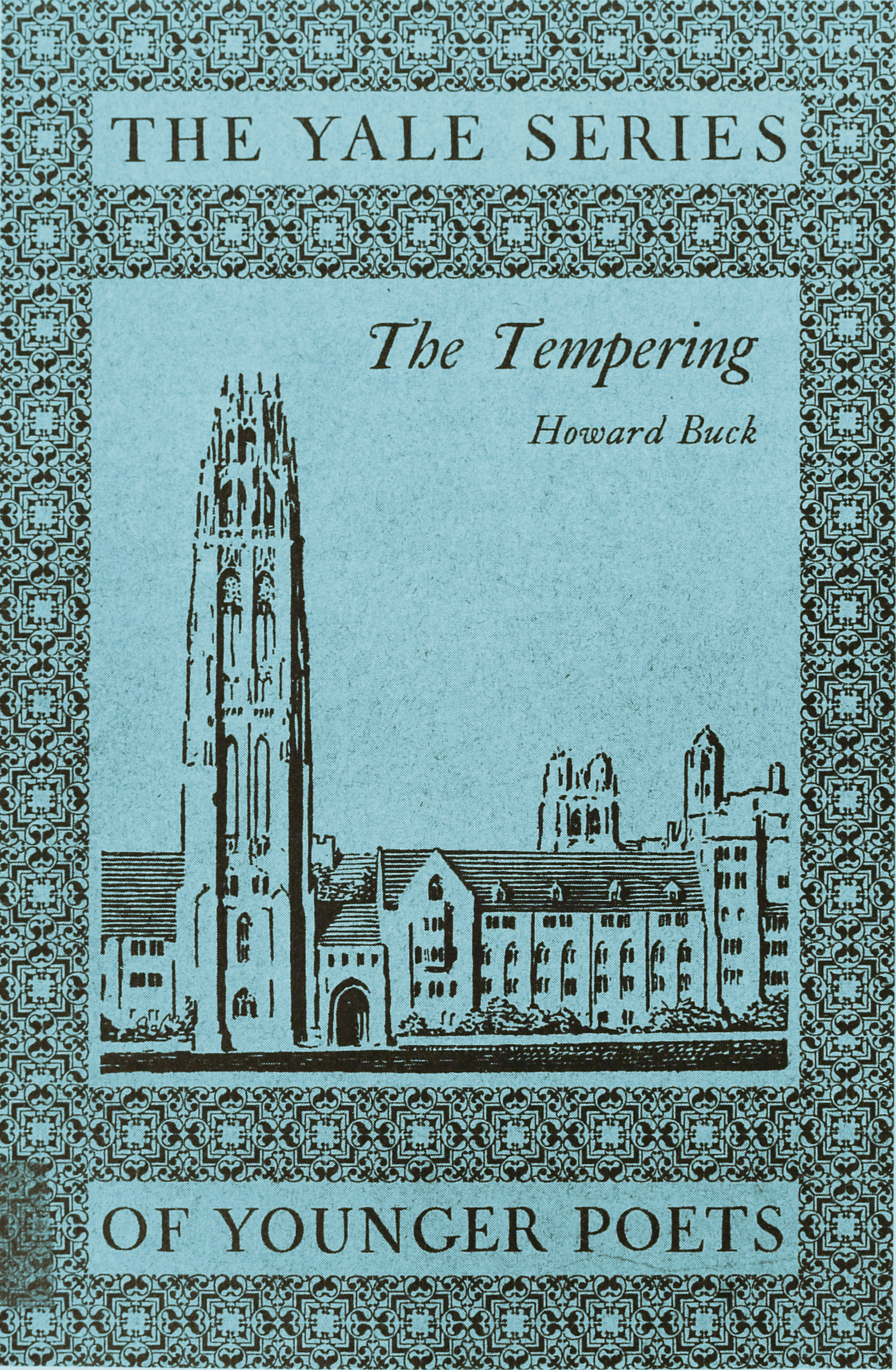
The Tempering, published by Howard Buck in 1919, is the first volume in the series.

The Younger Poets Series was established in 1919 by Clarence Day, whose brother George Parmly Day founded Yale University Press with his wife Wilhelmine in 1908. The competition's first judge, Charlton Miner Lewis, was a prominent professor in Yale's English department. The inaugural competition took place after the end of World War I, just as an influx of young veterans returned from fighting in Europe and entered college. Modernist poetry emerged in this period, but early entries in the series reflected the neoclassical tastes of the older generation adjudicating the competition, all men who had received degrees from Yale in the late-19th century. The anglophilic publishers were heavily influenced by English poetry, especially the contemporary Georgian poetry, and the competition itself was directly influenced by the similar "Adventures All" poetry series of Oxford University Press.

The contest solidified its importance in American literature under the judgeship of Stephen Vincent Benét. Benet was judge from 1933 to 1942, followed by Archibald MacLeish from 1944 to 1946. Margaret Walker's For My People was the last volume selected by Benet. Auden assumed the judgeship after MacLeish.

The contest is regarded by some to have been at its height from 1947 to 1959, when W. H. Auden was its judge. His then-young poets included Adrienne Rich, James Wright, W. S. Merwin, John Ashbery, and John Hollander. The period was also notable for the two-time refusal of Sylvia Plath's manuscript Two Lovers, and Colossus, which was subsequently published in England.

Between 1969 and 1977, overseen by Stanley Kunitz, included volumes by Carolyn Forché and Robert Hass; Hass later became the Poet Laureate of the United States.

=== 21st century ===
The judgeship of W. S. Merwin, from 1998 to 2003, was fraught with controversy, as he refused to select a winner the first year that he was judge. Louise Glück, who is widely considered to have revived the prize's stature, judged the award from 2003 to 2010. Rae Armantrout judged the prize from 2021 to 2025. Monica Youn is the current judge.

== Judges ==
Judges of the Yale Series of Younger Poets Competition

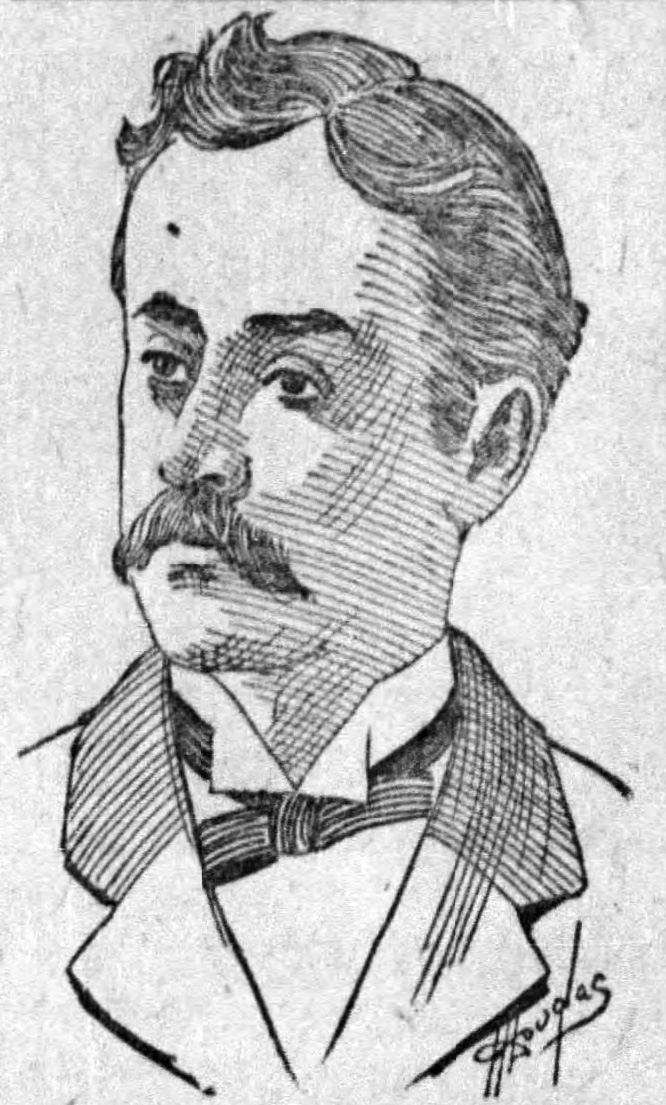
Charlton M. Lewis
(1919–1923)

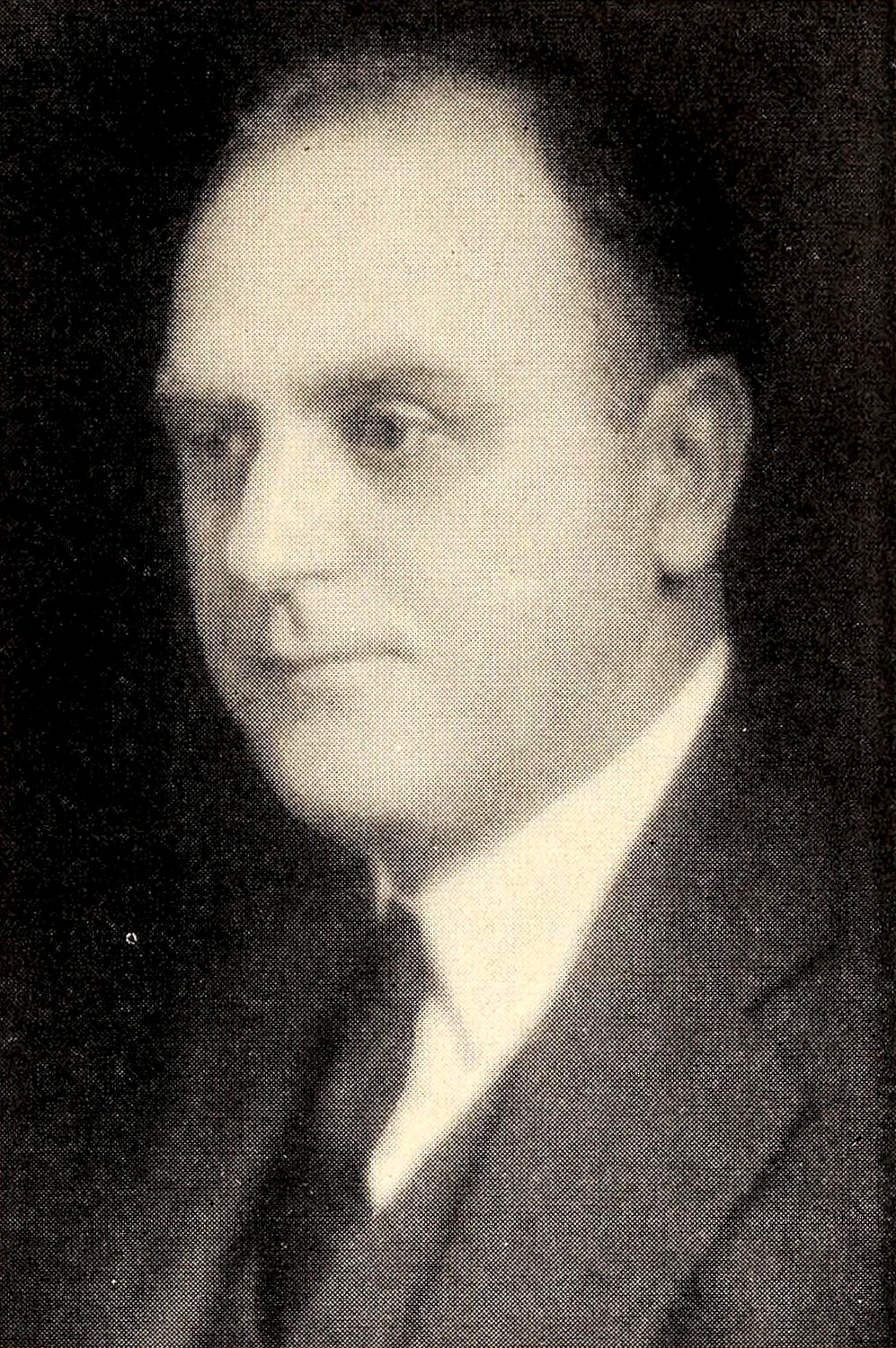
Frederick E. Pierce
(1923)

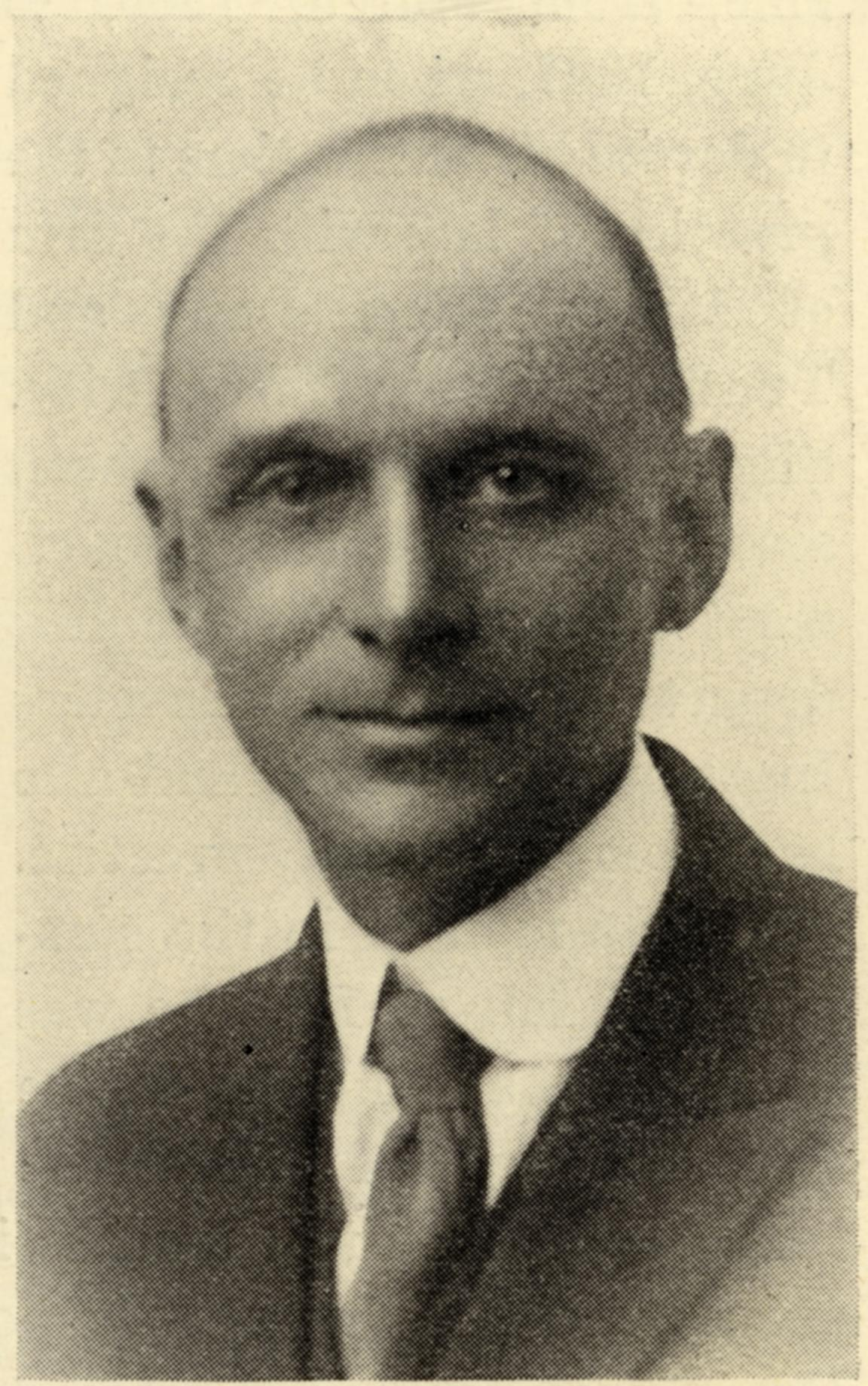
Edward Bliss Reed
(1923–24)

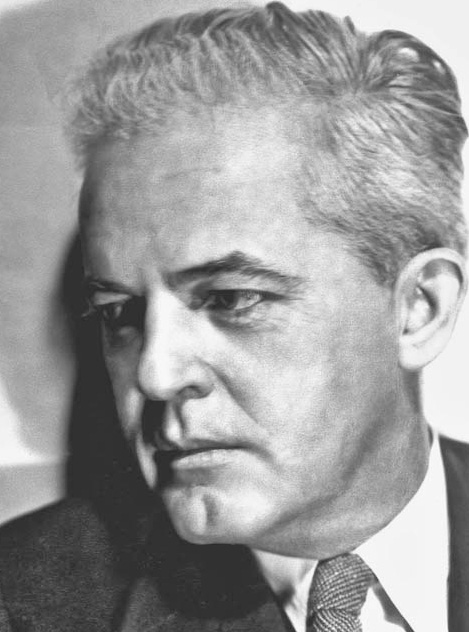
William Alexander Percy
(1925–1932)

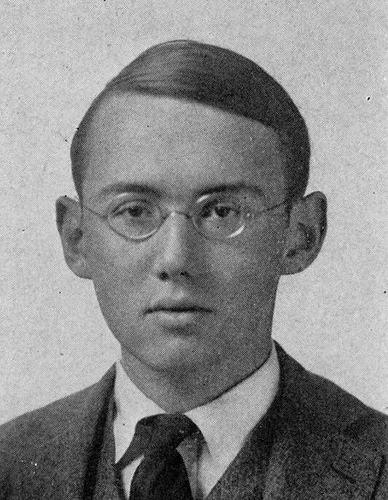
Stephen Vincent Benét
(1933–1942)

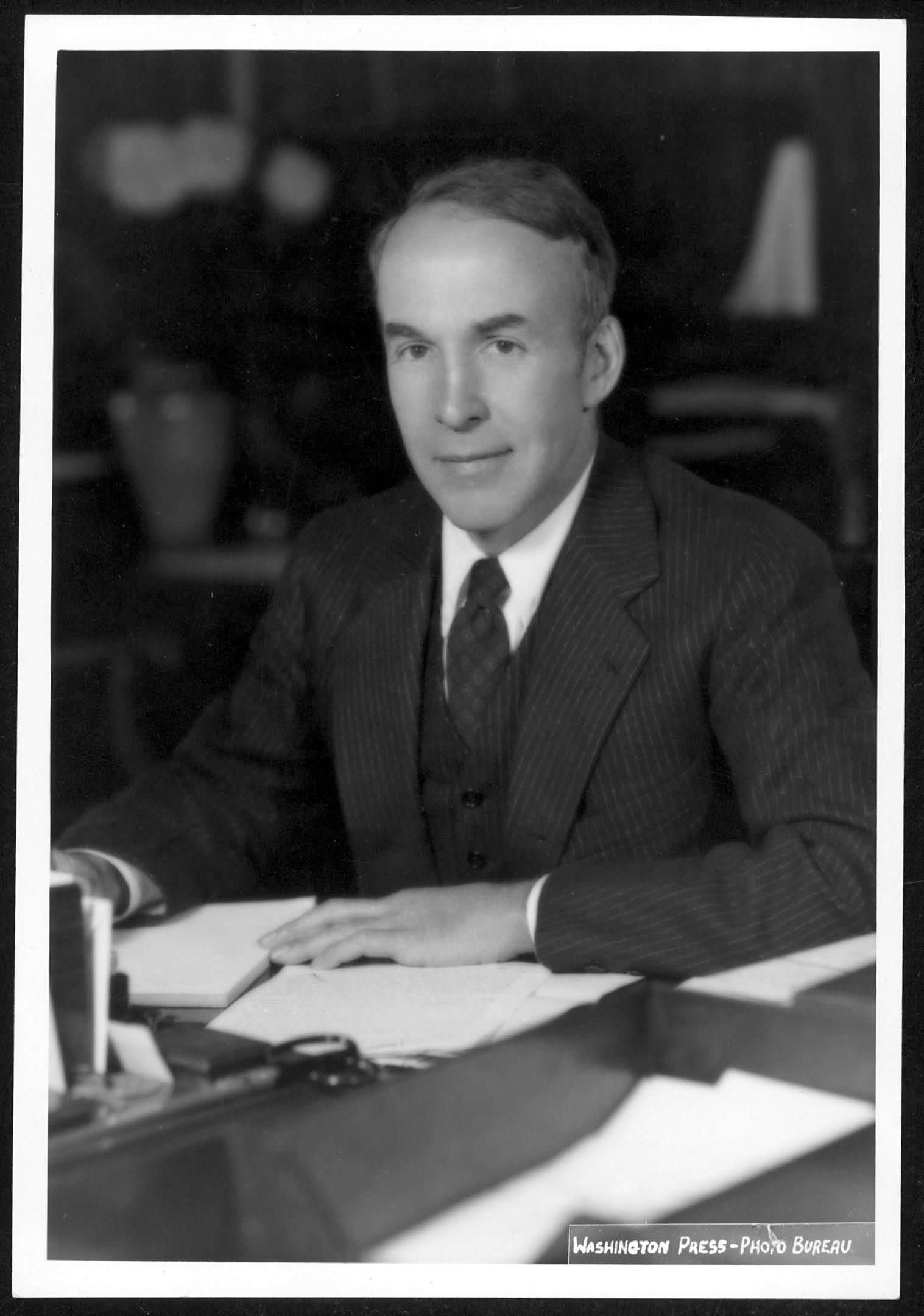
Archibald MacLeish
(1942–1945)

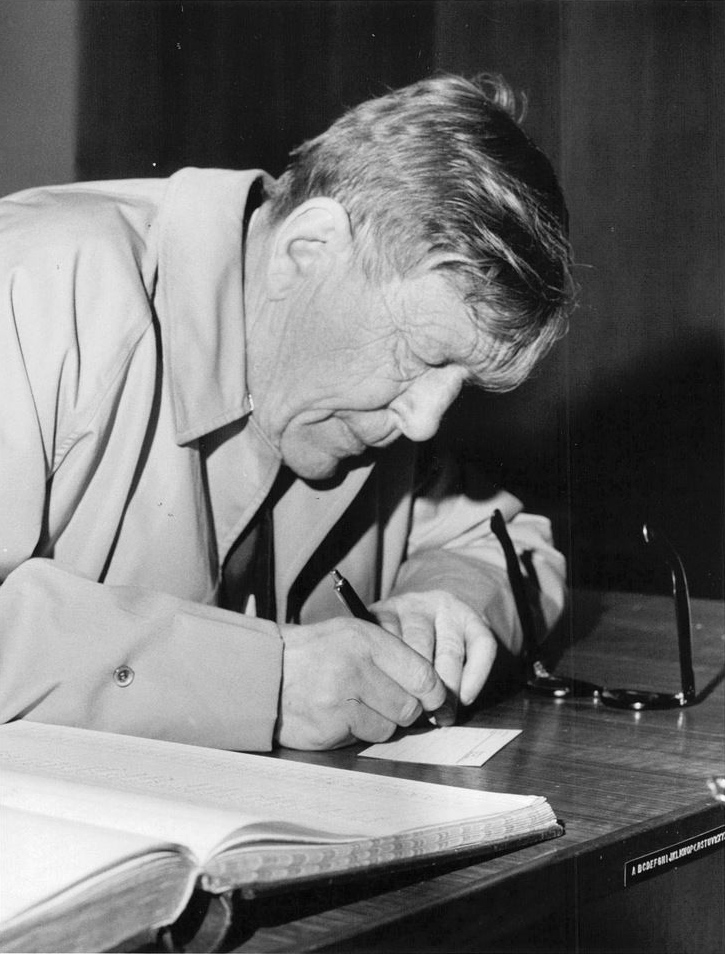
W. H. Auden
(1946–1958)

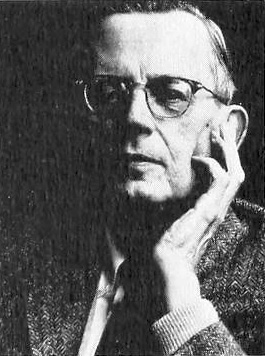
Dudley Fitts
(1958–1968)

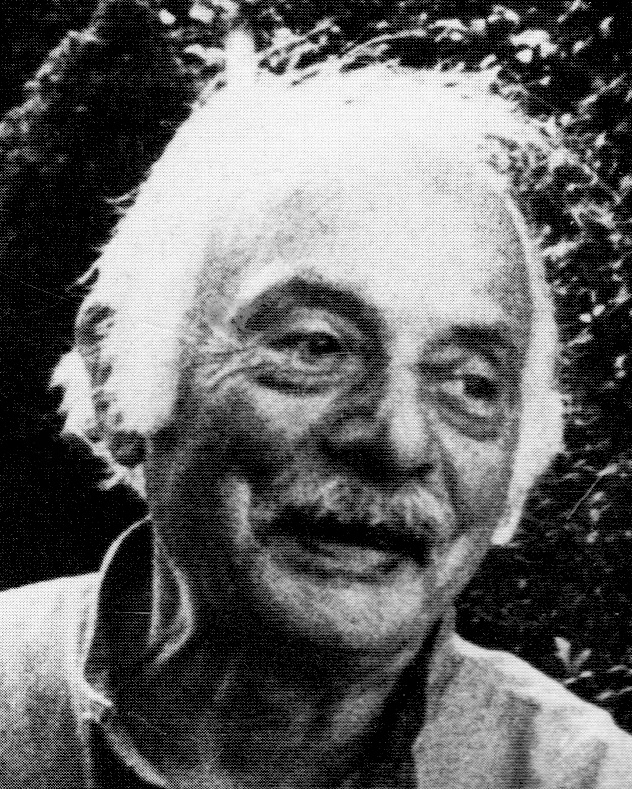
Stanley Kunitz
(1969–1976)

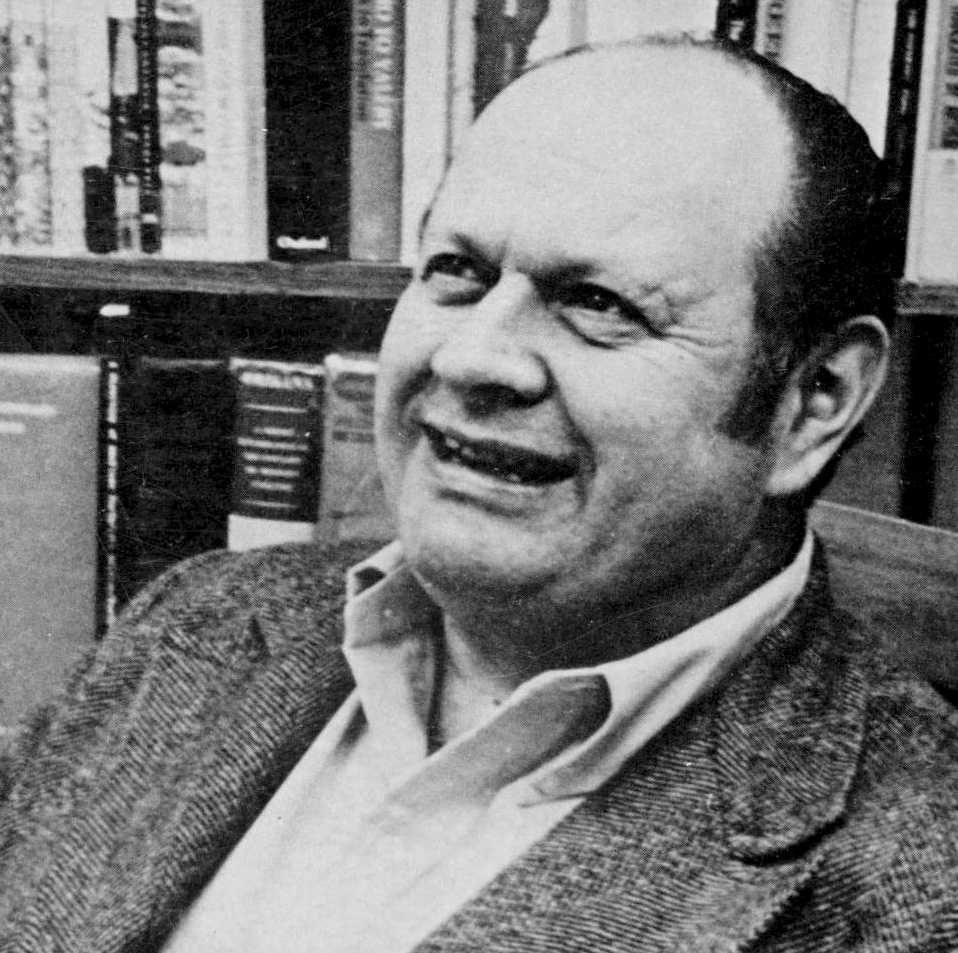
Richard Hugo
(1977–1982)

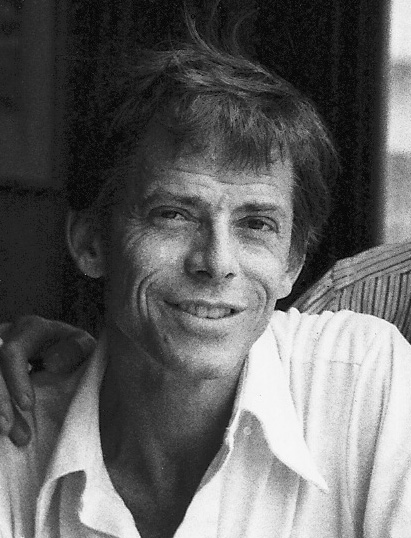
James Merrill
(1983–1989)

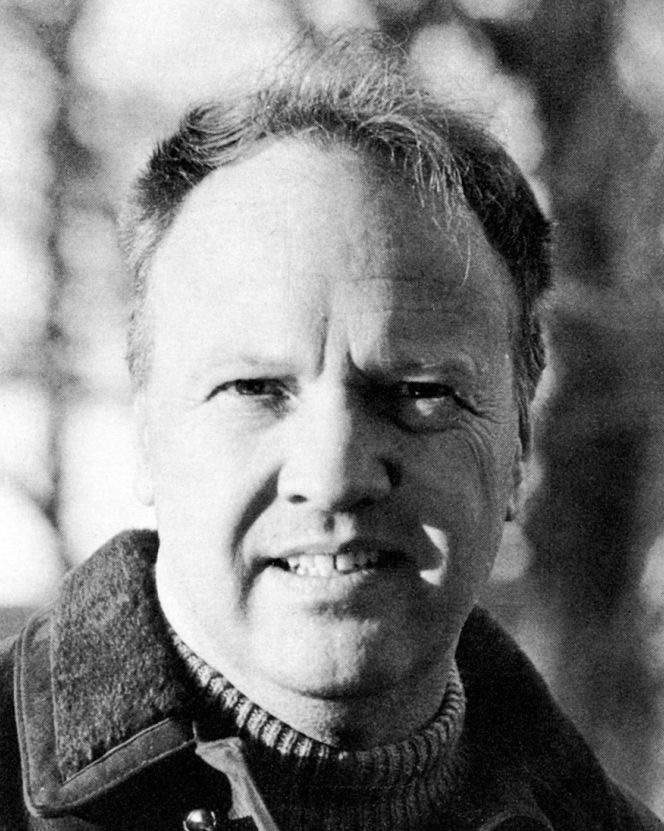
James Dickey
(1990–1996)

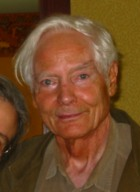
W. S. Merwin
(1997–2003)

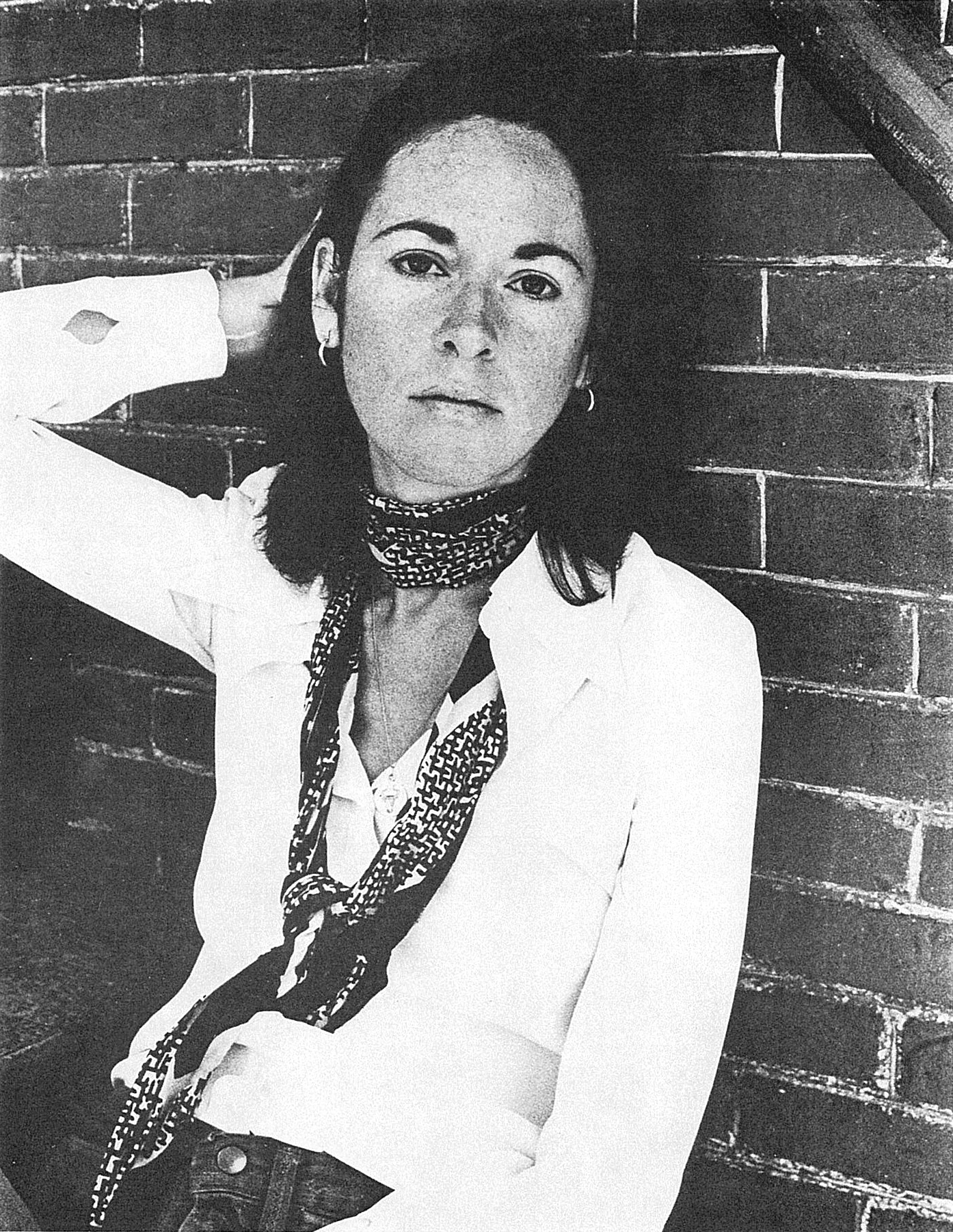
Louise Glück
(2003–2010)

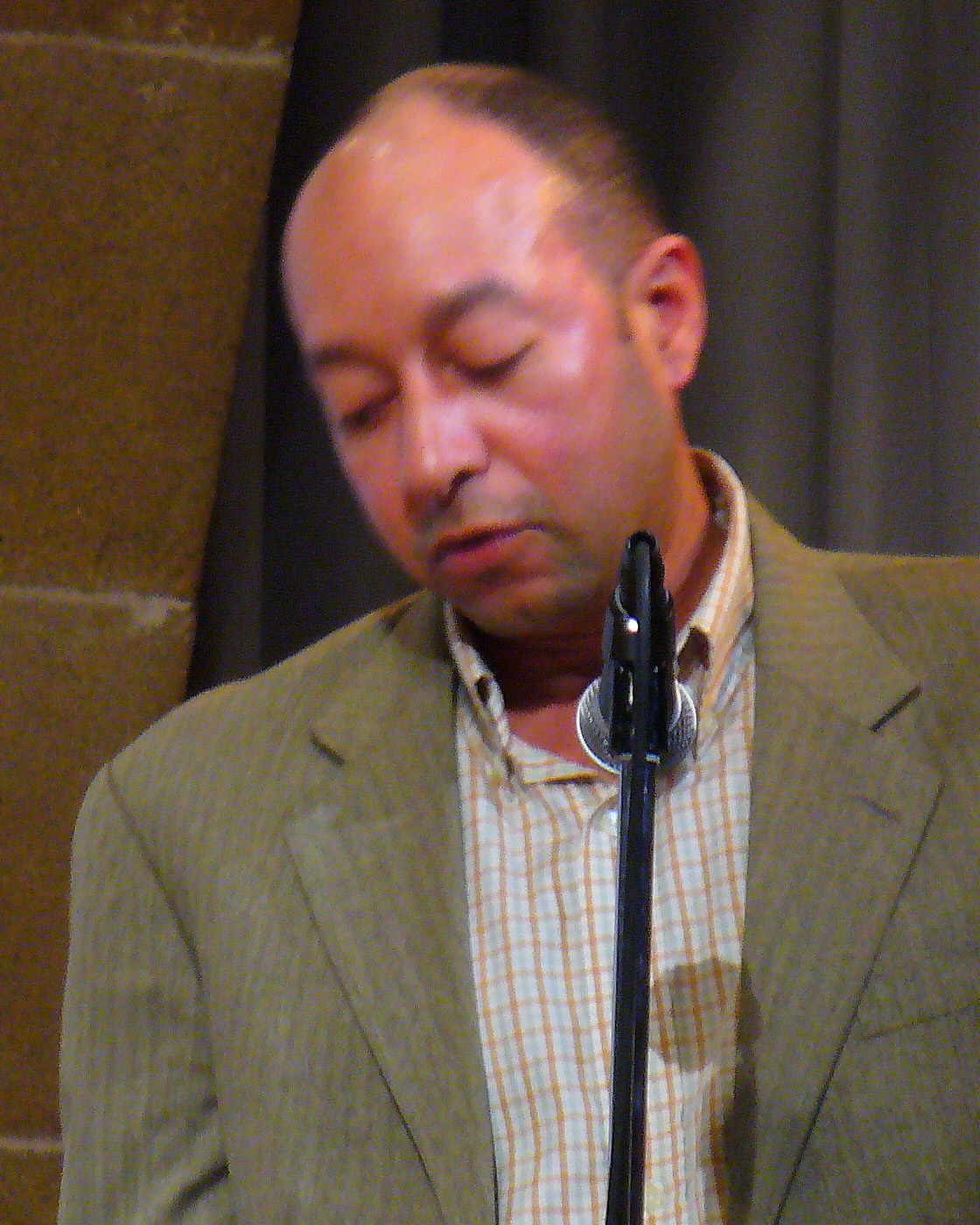
Carl Phillips
(2011–2020)

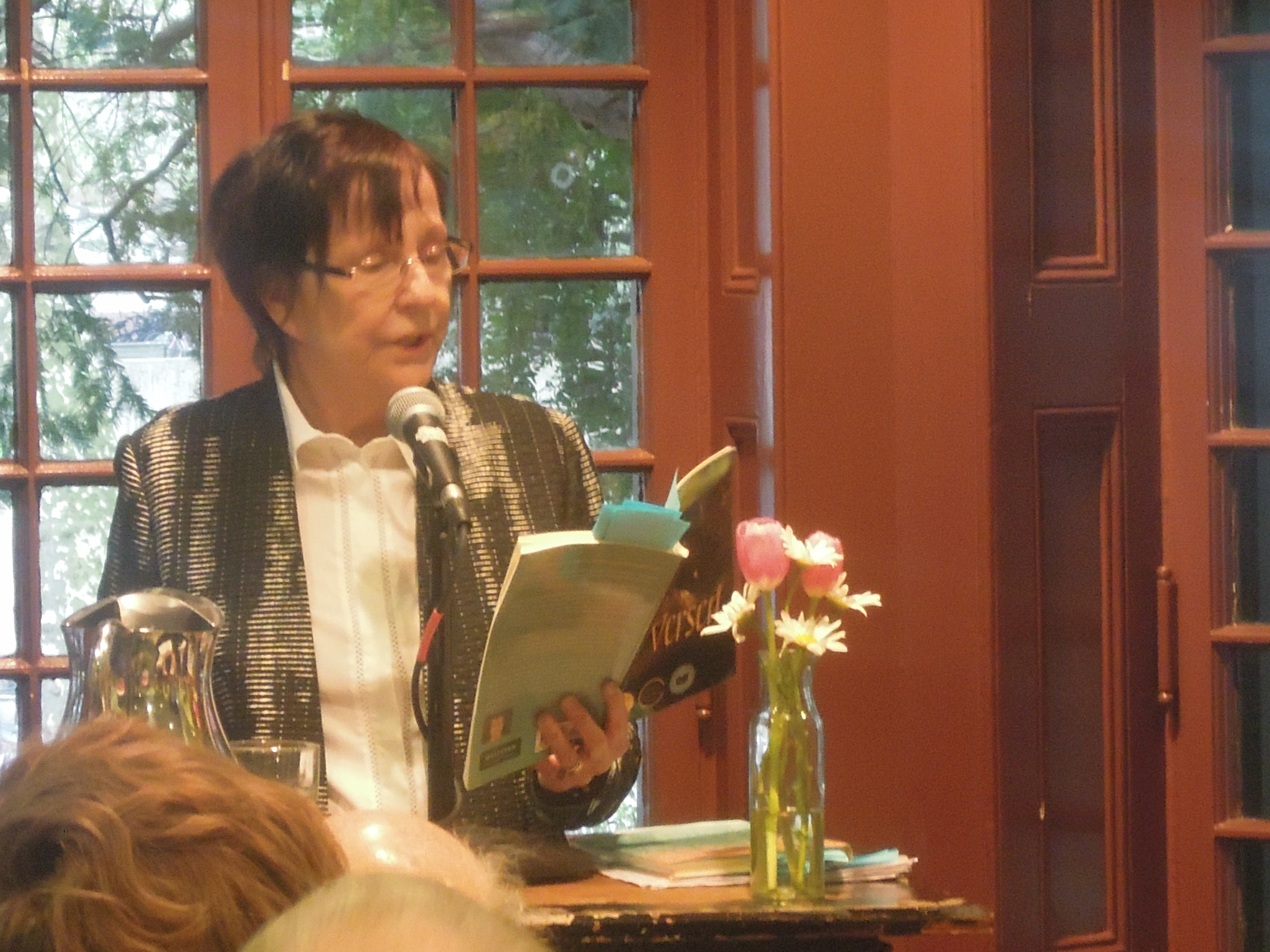
Rae Armantrout (2021–2025)

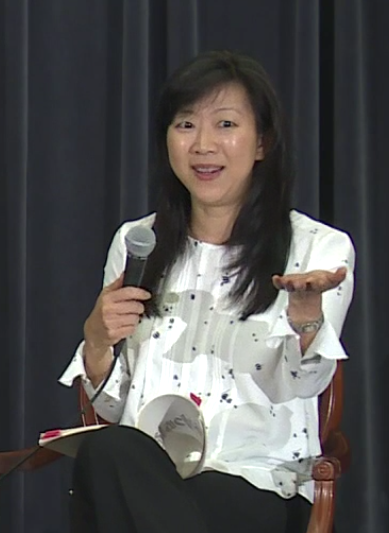
Monica Youn (2026–present)

== Past winners ==
The year column provides the date of the competition. The winning poetry collections are published the following year.

Year	Vol.	Poet	Title	Judge	Ref.
1918	1	Howard Buck	The Tempering	Charlton M. Lewis	
1918	2	John C. Farrar	Forgotten Shrines	Charlton M. Lewis	
1919	3	David Osborne Hamilton	Four Gardens	Charlton M. Lewis	
1919	4	Alfred Raymond Bellinger	Spires and Poplars	Charlton M. Lewis	
1919	5	Thomas Caldecot Chubb	The White God and Other Poems	Charlton M. Lewis	
1919	6	Darl MacLeod Boyle	Where Lilith Dances	Charlton M. Lewis	
1920	7	Theodore H. Jr. Banks	Wild Geese	Charlton M. Lewis	
1920	8	Viola C. White	Horizons	Charlton M. Lewis	
1920	9	Hervey Allen	Wampum and Old Gold	Charlton M. Lewis	
1920	10	Oscar Williams	Golden Darkness	Charlton M. Lewis	
1921	11	Harold Vinal	White April	Charlton M. Lewis	
1921	12	Medora C. Addison	Dreams and a Sword	Charlton M. Lewis	
1921	13	Bernard Raymund	Hidden Waters	Charlton M. Lewis	
1921	14	Paul Tanaquil	Attitudes	Charlton M. Lewis	
1922	15	Dean B. Jr. Lyman	The Last Lutanist	Charlton M. Lewis	
1922	16	Amos Niven Wilder	Battle-Retrospect	Charlton M. Lewis	
1922	17	Marion M. Boyd	Silver Wands	Frederick E. Pierce	
1922	18	Beatrice E. Harmon	Mosaics	Frederick E. Pierce	
1923	19	Elizabeth Jessup Blake	Up and Down	Edward Bliss Reed	
1924	20	Dorothy E. Reid	Coach into Pumpkin	William Alexander Percy	
1925	21	Eleanor Slater	Quest	William Alexander Percy	
1925	22	Thomas Hornsby Ferril	High Passage	William Alexander Percy	
1926	23	Lindley Williams Hubbell	Dark Pavilion	William Alexander Percy	
1927	24	Mildred Bowers	Twist o' Smoke	William Alexander Percy	
1927	25	Ted Olson	A Stranger and Afraid	William Alexander Percy	
1927	26	Francis Claiborne Mason	This Unchanging Mask	William Alexander Percy	
1928	27	Frances M. Frost	Hemlock Wall	William Alexander Percy	
1928	28	Henri Faust	Half-Light and Overture	William Alexander Percy	
1929	29	Louise Owen	Virtuosa	William Alexander Percy	
1930	30	Dorothy Belle Flanagan (aka Dorothy B. Hughes)	Dark Certainty	William Alexander Percy	
1931	31	Paul Engle	Worn Earth	William Alexander Percy	
1932	32	Shirley Barker	The Dark Hills Under	Stephen Vincent Benét	
1933	33	James Agee	Permit Me Voyage	Stephen Vincent Benét	
1934	34	Muriel Rukeyser	Theory of Flight	Stephen Vincent Benét	
1935	35	Edward Weismiller	The Deer Come Down	Stephen Vincent Benét	
1936	36	Margaret Haley	The Gardener Mind	Stephen Vincent Benét	
1937	37	Joy Davidman	Letter to a Comrade	Stephen Vincent Benét	
1938	38	Reuel Denney	The Connecticut River and Other Poems	Stephen Vincent Benét	
1939	39	Norman Rosten	Return Again, Traveler	Stephen Vincent Benét	
1940	40	Jeremy Ingalls	The Metaphysical Sword	Stephen Vincent Benét	
1941	41	Margaret Walker	For My People	Stephen Vincent Benét	
1942	No winner selected			Archibald MacLeish	
1943	42	William Morris Jr. Meredith	Love Letters from an Impossible Land	Archibald MacLeish	
1944	43	Charles E. Butler	Cut Is the Branch	Archibald MacLeish	
1945	44	Eve Merriam	Family Circle	Archibald MacLeish	
1946	45	Joan Murray	Poems	W. H. Auden	
1947	46	Robert Horan	A Beginning	W. H. Auden	
1948	47	Rosalie Moore	The Grasshopper's Man and Other Poems	W. H. Auden	
1949	No winner selected			W. H. Auden	
1950	48	Adrienne Rich	A Change of World	W. H. Auden	
1951	49	W. S. Merwin	A Mask for Janus	W. H. Auden	
1952	50	Edgar Bogardus	Various Jangling Keys	W. H. Auden	
1953	51	Daniel Hoffman	An Armada of Thirty Whales	W. H. Auden	
1954	No winner selected			W. H. Auden	
1955	52	John Ashbery	Some Trees	W. H. Auden	
1956	53	James Wright	The Green Wall	W. H. Auden	
1957	54	John Hollander	A Crackling of Thorns	W. H. Auden	
1958	55	William Dickey	Of the Festivity	W. H. Auden	
1959	56	George Starbuck	Bone Thoughts	Dudley Fitts	
1960	57	Alan Dugan	Poems	Dudley Fitts	
1961	58	Jack Gilbert	Views of Jeopardy	Dudley Fitts	
1962	59	Sandra Hochman	Manhattan Pastures	Dudley Fitts	
1963	60	Peter Davison	The Breaking of the Day	Dudley Fitts	
1964	61	Jean Valentine	Dream Barker	Dudley Fitts	
1965	No winner selected			Dudley Fitts	
1966	62	James Tate	The Lost Pilot	Dudley Fitts	
1967	63	Helen Chasin	Coming Close and Other Poems	Dudley Fitts	
1968	64	Judith Johnson Sherwin	Uranium Poems	Dudley Fitts	
1969	65	Hugh Seidman	Collecting Evidence	Stanley Kunitz	
1970	66	Peter Klappert	Lugging Vegetables to Nantucket	Stanley Kunitz	
1971	67	Michael Casey	Obscenities	Stanley Kunitz	
1972	68	Robert Hass	Field Guide	Stanley Kunitz	
1973	69	Michael Ryan	Threats Instead of Trees	Stanley Kunitz	
1974	70	Maura Stanton	Snow on Snow	Stanley Kunitz	
1975	71	Carolyn Forché	Gathering the Tribes	Stanley Kunitz	
1976	72	Olga Broumas	Beginning with O	Stanley Kunitz	
1977	73	Bin Ramke	The Difference Between Night and Day	Richard Hugo	
1978	74	Leslie Ullman	Natural Histories	Richard Hugo	
1979	75	William Virgil Davis	One Way to Reconstruct the Scene	Richard Hugo	
1980	76	John Bensko	Green Soldiers	Richard Hugo	
1981	77	David Wojahn	Icehouse Lights	Richard Hugo	
1982	78	Cathy Song	Picture Bride	Richard Hugo	
1983	79	Richard Kenney	The Evolution of the Flightless Bird	James Merrill	
1984	80	Pamela Alexander	Navigable Waterways	James Merrill	
1985	81	George Bradley	Terms to Be Met	James Merrill	
1986	82	Julie Agoos	Above the Land	James Merrill	
1987	83	Brigit Pegeen Kelly	To the Place of Trumpets	James Merrill	
1988	84	Thomas Bolt	Out of the Woods	James Merrill	
1989	85	Daniel Hall	Hermit with Landscape	James Merrill	
1990	86	Christiane Jacox Kyle	Bears Dancing in the Northern Air	James Dickey	
1991	87	Nicholas Samaras	Hands of the Saddlemaker	James Dickey	
1992	88	Jody Gladding	Stone Crop	James Dickey	
1993	89	Valerie Wohlfeld	Thinking the World Visible	James Dickey	
1994	90	Tony Crunk	Living in the Resurrection	James Dickey	
1995	91	Ellen Hinsey	Cities of Memory	James Dickey	
1996	92	Talvikki Ansel	My Shining Archipelago	James Dickey	
1997	No winner selected			W. S. Merwin	
1998	93	Craig Arnold	Shells	W. S. Merwin	
1999	94	Davis McCombs	Ultima Thule	W. S. Merwin	
2000	95	Maurice Manning	Lawrence Booth's Book of Visions	W. S. Merwin	
2001	96	Sean Singer	Discography	W. S. Merwin	
2002	97	Loren Goodman	Famous Americans	W. S. Merwin	
2003	98	Peter Streckfus	The Cuckoo	W. S. Merwin	
2004	99	Richard Siken	Crush	Louise Glück	
2005	100	Jay Hopler	Green Squall	Louise Glück	
2006	101	Jessica Fisher	Frail-Craft	Louise Glück	
2007	102	Fady Joudah	The Earth in the Attic	Louise Glück	
2008	103	Arda Collins	It Is Daylight	Louise Glück	
2009	104	Ken Chen	Juvenilia	Louise Glück	
2010	105	Katherine Larson	Radial Symmetry	Louise Glück	
2011	106	Eduardo C. Corral	Slow Lightning	Carl Phillips	
2012	107	Will Schutt	Westerly	Carl Phillips	
2013	108	Eryn Green	Eruv	Carl Phillips	
2014	109	Ansel Elkins	Blue Yodel	Carl Phillips	
2015	110	Noah Warren	The Destroyer in the Glass	Carl Phillips	
2016	111	Airea D. Matthews	simulacra	Carl Phillips	
2017	112	Duy Doan	We Play a Game	Carl Phillips	
2018	113	Yanyi	The Year of Blue Water	Carl Phillips	
2019	114	Jill Osier	The Solace Is Not the Lullaby	Carl Phillips	
2020	115	Desiree C. Bailey	What Noise Against The Cane	Carl Phillips	
2021	116	Robert Wood Lynn	Mothman Apologia	Rae Armantrout	
2022	117	Mary-Alice Daniel	Mass for Shut-Ins	Rae Armantrout	
2023	118	Cindy Juyoung Ok	Ward Toward	Rae Armantrout	
2024	119	John Liles	Bees, and After	Rae Armantrout	
2025	120	Isabel Neal	Thrown Voice	Rae Armantrout	
2026	121	JC Andrews	Of an Ilk	Monica Youn	

== See also ==
- American poetry
- List of poetry awards
- List of literary awards
- List of years in poetry
- List of years in literature
