= David Osborne Hamilton =

American poet

David Osborne Hamilton (June 19, 1893 – January 30, 1953) was an American poet.

He edited the Yale Literary Magazine. His work appeared in Measure, and The Century Magazine.

== Awards ==
- 1920 Yale Series of Younger Poets Competition

== Works ==
- "Our Time", Poetry, 1921
- Four gardens. Yale University Press. 1920.
- Picaresque, C. Scribner's sons, 1930

=== Anthologies ===
- William Stanley Braithwaite, ed. (2009). "The Idiot". Anthology of Magazine Verse for 1922, and Year Book of American Poetry. BiblioBazaar, LLC. ISBN 978-1-110-31728-8.
- Leonard A Strong, ed. (1977). "Once More the Moon". The Best Poems of 1923. Ayer Publishing. ISBN 978-0-8369-6354-0.
- ”Elizabeth” “May” “November” “A Portrait” & “To Men Unborn”, Michigan Poets: 1936
