= Tony Crunk =

American poet

Tony Crunk is an American poet whose first volume of poetry, Living in the Resurrection, won the Yale Series of Younger Poets Competition.

== Biography ==
Crunk was born in Hopkinsville, Kentucky. He received his B.A. at Centre College, an M.A. in philosophy at University of Kentucky, and an M.A. in literature and M.F.A. in creative writing from the University of Virginia.

Crunk has taught at the University of Virginia, James Madison University, Murray State University (Kentucky), the University of Montana, Samford University, and University of Alabama Birmingham, where he administers the Alabama Writers' Forum. In 1997, he was awarded one of eight Writer's Community Residence Awards. In 2008, Crunk was chosen to represent Kentucky at the Library of Congress Poetry at Noon series.

== Work ==
In 1994, his first collection of poetry, Living in the Resurrection, published in 1995, won that year's Yale Series of Younger Poets Competition. In the foreword, James Dickey noted that these poems spoke of a "quest" for a spiritual home, which Dickey located in the American South, the art being that of "Southern gospel music and homiletics." The theme of an odyssey is echoed by critic Steve Harris. In a lengthy review of Crunk's work, critic Vincent King states that Dickey's conception of Crunk's art is a misreading (perhaps caused by Dickey's failing health in 1994), and that rather the tension between Crunk's Christian heritage and his rejection of his Southern Baptism is the key to the interpretation of the poems.

Crunk's 2010 New Covenant Bound is a collection of poems inspired by the displacement between 1935 and 1969 of some 20,000 inhabitants in order to create the Land Between the Lakes (then known as Land Between the Rivers) between the Cumberland and Tennessee rivers in western Kentucky and Tennessee. The collection centers around how the US federal government's seizure of this land affected the narrator's family.

== Works ==
=== Poetry ===
- Living in the Resurrection. Yale University Press. 1994. ISBN 978-0-300-06526-8.
- Parables and Revelations. Finishing Line Press. 2005. ISBN 1-59924-022-X.
- Cumberland. 2007.
- New Covenant Bound. University Press of Kentucky. 2010. ISBN 978-0-8131-2599-2.
- Biblia Pauperum. Accents Publishing. 2013. ISBN 978-1-936628-21-6.

=== Children's books ===
- Big Mama. Farrar, Straus & Giroux. 1999. ISBN 978-0-374-30688-5.
- Grandpa's Overalls. Orchard Books. 2000. ISBN 978-0-531-30321-4.
- Railroad John and the Red Rock Run. Peachtree. 2006. ISBN 978-1-56145-363-4.

== Criticism ==
- Reuben; The Legend of Caty Sage, Alabama Writers' Forum

== External references ==
- Celebrating Kentucky Poets, Library of Congress webcasts, 18 November 2008
