= Arda Collins =

American poet

- Born: New York, U.S.
- Education: Iowa Writers' Workshop, University of Denver
- Writing career
- Genre: Poetry

Arda Collins is an American poet and winner of the Yale Series of Younger Poets Competition.

== Life ==
Collins was born in New York. She is a graduate of the Iowa Writers' Workshop, where she was a Glenn Schaeffer Fellow, and the University of Denver, where she received a Ph.D. in poetry.

Her book It Is Daylight was selected by Louise Glück for the Yale Series of Younger Poets.

She has taught at the University of Massachusetts Amherst, New York University, and at Victoria University in Wellington, New Zealand. She is currently the Grace Hazard Conkling Writer in Residence at Smith College. She lives in Amherst, Massachusetts.

Her poems have been published in journals and magazines including The New Yorker, jubilat, The American Poetry Review, A Public Space and Gutcult.

== Awards ==
- 2008 winner of the Yale Series of Younger Poets competition.
- 2008 American Academy of Arts and Sciences' (AAAS) Poetry Prize
- 2008 May Sarton Prize

== Works ==
- Star Lake, New York : The Song Cave, 2022. ISBN 9781737277545
- It is daylight, New Haven : Yale University Press, 2009. ISBN 9780300148879, OCLC 637375983
