= Lindley Williams Hubbell =

American poet and translator (1901–1994)

- Born: June 3, 1901; Hartford, Connecticut, U.S.
- Died: October 2, 1994 (aged 93); Kyoto, Japan
- Education: Hartford Public High School
- Occupations: Poet; translator

Lindley Williams Hubbell (June 3, 1901 – October 2, 1994) was an American poet and translator.

== Biography ==
Hubbell was born in Hartford, Connecticut, to an old Puritan family, and showed interest in literature from an early age. He attended Hartford High School for two years and received lessons from private tutors, but didn't receive any collegiate education. In 1926 he began working as a reference librarian at the New York Public Library, and one year later was awarded the Yale Younger Poets award. Yale University Press published his first book of poetry, Dark Pavilion, and his work began to appear in magazines such as Poetry. He was an early champion of Gertrude Stein, and the two of them maintained a lengthy friendship, the correspondence of which is held at Yale University. In 1946 he left his position at the NYPL to head the literature department at the Randall School in Hartford, a position he held until 1953, when he took a job cataloging books at Daitoku-ji, which in turn led to a teaching position at Doshisha University in Kyoto, Japan. He became a naturalized Japanese citizen that year and changed his name to Hayashi Shuseki. He retired from teaching in 1970 and remained in Japan for the rest of his life. He died in Kyoto in 1994.

== Works ==
=== Poetry ===
- Dark Pavilion. Yale University Press, 1927. (Yale Series of Younger Poets)
- The Tracing of a Portal. Yale University Press, 1931.
- Winter-Burning. Alfred A. Knopf, 1938.
- The Ninth Continent. Alan Swallow, 1947. (pamphlet)
- Long Island Triptych & Other Poems. Alan Swallow, 1947.
- The Birth of the Diatom: A Christmas Play. Banyan Press, 1949. (pamphlet)
- Seventy Poems. Alan Swallow, 1965.
- Atlantic Press. The Ikuta Press, 1971.
- Autobiography. The Ikuta Press, 1971.
- Double Triptych. The Ikuta Press, 1974.
- Pasiphae. The Ikuta Press, 1976.
- Trilogy. The Ikuta Press, 1977.
- Climbing to Monfumo. The Ikuta Press, 1977.
- Walking through Numba. The Ikuta Press, 1978.
- Air Poem. The Yamashina Press, 1979.
- Czerny. The Ikuta Press, 1982.
- The First Architect. The Ikuta Press, 1982.

=== Prose ===
- Lectures on Shakespeare. Nan'un-do, 1958.
- Shakespeare and Classic Drama. Nan'un-do, 1962.
- A Note on the Shakespeare Apocrypha. The Yamashina Press, 1966.
- Miscellany. Nan'un-do, 1972.
- A Second Miscellany. The Ikuta Press, 1972.
- The Ten Avatars of Vishnu. The Ikuta Press, 1978.
- The English Lyric in the 17th Century. The Ikuta Press, 1981.
- Studies in English Literature. Yamaguchi Shoten, 1982.

=== Translations ===
- Aki nop Hi. Nan'un-do, 1962.
- Translations. The Ikuta Press, 1983.
- Oedipus at Colonus, from Sophocles. The Ikuta Press, 1983.
- The Suppliants, from Aeschylus. The Ikuta Press, 1986.
