= Peter Streckfus =

American poet (born 1969)

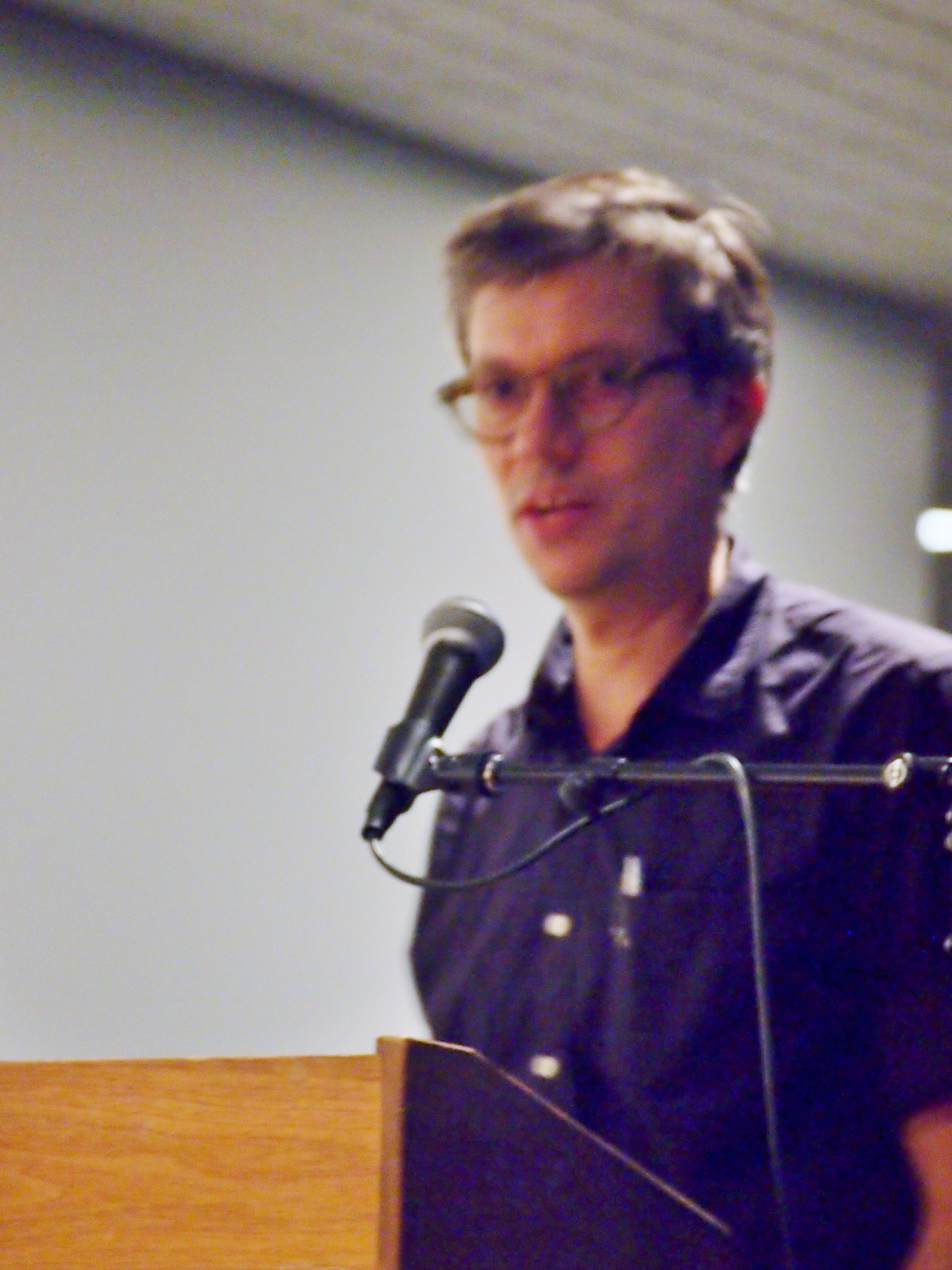
- at Fall for the Book, 2014
- Born: 1969 (age 56–57); San Antonio, Texas
- Occupation: professor
- Writing career
- Genre: Poetry

Peter Streckfus (born 1969 in San Antonio, Texas) is an American poet.

His first book, The Cuckoo, won the 2003 Yale Series of Younger Poets competition, chosen by Louise Glück. His second book, Errings, won Fordham University Press's 2013 POL Editor's Prize.

His honors include the 2013–14 Brodsky Rome Prize Fellowship in Literature at the American Academy in Rome. He is a professor of English at George Mason University. Streckfus has taught at Western Connecticut State University and the University of Alabama. He is on faculty in the Creative Writing Program at George Mason University as well as the low-residency MFA at Cedar College. He lives in the Washington D.C. area with his wife, the poet and translator Heather Green.

== Bibliography ==
- Peter Streckfus (March 6, 2014). Errings. Fordham University Press. ISBN 978-0-823-25776-8.
- Peter Streckfus (March 11, 2004). The Cuckoo. Yale University Press. ISBN 978-0-300-10271-0.
