= The Year of Blue Water =

2019 debut poetry book by Yanyi

- Author: Yanyi
- Publisher: Yale University Press
- Publication date: March 26, 2019
- Pages: 92
- Award: Yale Series of Younger Poets
- ISBN: 978-0300242645
- Followed by: Dream of the Divided Field

The Year of Blue Water is a 2019 debut poetry collection by American poet Yanyi, published by Yale University Press. It was the winner of the 2018 Yale Series of Younger Poets and a finalist for the Lambda Literary Award for Transgender Poetry. It features a foreword written by American poet Carl Phillips.

== Content ==
The Year of Blue Water's poems range in form from lyric to prose poetry, addressing subject matter such as transgender Chinese American identity, trauma, gender, and art. With regard to art, the book converses with traditions and legacies by artists like Maggie Nelson, Robin Coste Lewis, Frank O'Hara, and Louise Glück. It features an epigraph quoting Susan Sontag.

Carl Phillips, who selected the book for the Yale Series of Younger Poets, noted in the book's foreword:

Queerness, familial expectations, mental health issues —so much for what this writer, then, is up against. Again, though, the appeal of this book lies in how it refuses a predictable engagement with trauma and the catalysts behind it, and instead works as the living musculature of what I suppose could be called recovery, but I prefer stabilization, for its suggestion of recovery-for-now, of the ongoing work of maintaining balance, as opposed to defeating imbalance.

Yale University Press reprinted excerpts of the book online during Pride Month in 2024.

== Background ==
The Year of Blue Water originated out of a notebook where Yanyi wrote "literally anything", at first not intending to write and publish a poetry collection from it. Eventually, Yanyi organized a manuscript structure and revised selected poems from his notebook until the book materialized.

A former Margins Fellow at Asian American Writers' Workshop, Yanyi published three poems from the book in the organization's literary magazine, The Margins, in 2017.

== Critical reception ==
The Year of Blue Water was recommended on several lists. BuzzFeed News placed it on a listicle titled "15 Books By Queer Authors You Should Read". The Washington Post named it in a list about poets whose works tackled race, gender, and violence. Kyle Lucia Wu recommended it for LitHub in 2021.

BOMB Magazine said, "The book is a stunning archive of Yanyi’s mental universe as he examines the construction of selfhood from a trans masculine perspective, the cultural boundaries of nation states as both a Chinese and American citizen, and intergenerational dialogue between friends and literati". The New York Journal of Books wrote that "The experiences that Yanyi captures in his poetry sensitizes the readers’ understanding of the trans community still striving to claim respect and dignity."

The Year of Blue Water won the 2018 Yale Series of Younger Poets and was a finalist for the Lambda Literary Award for Transgender Poetry.
