= We Play a Game =

2018 debut poetry collection by Duy Doan

- Author: Duy Doan
- Publisher: Yale University Press
- Publication date: March 20, 2018
- Pages: 104
- Awards: Yale Younger Poets Prize
- ISBN: 978-0300230871

We Play a Game is a 2018 debut poetry collection by Duy Doan. It was published by Yale University Press after Carl Phillips selected it for the 112th Yale Younger Poets Prize in 2017. The book went on to win a Lambda Literary Award for Bisexual Poetry in 2019.

== Contents ==
Doan's parents, both Vietnamese, fled Vietnam in 1975 and subsequently met in Texas following their respective resettlements. Growing up, Doan had a limited grasp of Vietnamese, stating, "my fluency in Vietnamese isn’t where I want it to be … I cherish the Vietnamese I do know." Accordingly, the book's poems concern Doan's identity as a Vietnamese American, the recent history of Vietnam and its city of Saigon, and the sport of soccer. Some use Vietnamese words and phrases, and a glossary is included in the back of the book to translate them. In Saigoneer, Doan stated, "it’s important to me that people understand that I and other Vietnamese-Americans are trying to honor or remember our heritage. And we’re sometimes sad about it."

In 2017, Doan's manuscript was selected by Phillips for the Yale Series of Younger Poets, after which it was published in March 2018. Phillips had helped Doan strengthen the thematic connections between his poems and consider the broader movement and cohesion of the poetry collection as a whole. In his foreword, Phillips wrote:

"A quieter, not at all unrelated, and no less important question of the poem, thanks to its juxtaposing of Vietnamese and English, is: What does it mean to live in two languages or, maybe more exactly, in that emptier space (the white space of the page) between? Wisely, Doan never answers this question directly, but the poems themselves suggest that to work with and within language, if a game, is a game as complicated and delicate as soccer".

== Critical reception ==
Publishers Weekly observed the book's articulations of love, pain, and diaspora, stating "Refreshingly unshowy, Doan’s collection is not an obvious choice for a big prize, but it reveals itself to be a deserving one." In a starred review, Library Journal said Doan both embodied and defied Vietnamese American identity, calling his book "Bold, bright, yet decidedly unsettled and unsettling".

Critics paid attention to the book's bilingualism. The Georgia Review particularly observed Doan's expansive and capacious use of the Vietnamese language. Hyphen said "Doan deftly weaves together personal narrative, myth and history—and weds freeform lyricism to a skillful use of received forms such as the pantoum."
