= ... (poetry collection) =

2024 poetry collection by Fady Joudah

[...]
- Author: Fady Joudah
- Publisher: Milkweed Editions
- Publication date: March 5, 2024
- Pages: 100
- Award: Jackson Poetry Prize
- ISBN: 978-1639551286
- Preceded by: Tethered to Stars: Poems

[...] is a poetry collection by Palestinian American poet Fady Joudah, published by Milkweed Editions in the US and by Out-Spoken Press in the UK. Natalie Diaz, Gregory Pardlo, and Diane Seuss selected the collection for the 2024 Jackson Poetry Prize. It was a finalist for the 2024 National Book Award for Poetry and was shortlisted for the 2024 Forward Prize for Best Collection.

== Contents and background ==
The book's poems involve the experiences of Palestinians amid the Israeli–Palestinian conflict, both those on the ground as well as those in the broader Palestinian diaspora. Many of the poems are titled "[...]" after the book's title. Joudah said the title "functions as a pictogram: a pictorial symbol that transports meaning by representing a physical object. It also evokes silence and erasure".

In an interview with Aria Aber, Joudah stated that he wrote most of the poems in a span of ten weeks between October and December 2023. Joudah told Boston Review that "It wasn't a conscious decision to write this book" but rather a survival response to "the first three months of carnage of Gaza."

After the 2021 Israel-Palestine conflict in May of that year, Joudah submitted poetry to The New Yorker to publish as a means of providing a Palestinian perspective to the current events at hand. The poem wasn't taken, after which Joudah, in June, published an essay entitled "My Palestinian Poem that 'The New Yorker' Wouldn't Publish" in Los Angeles Review of Books that included the aforementioned poem, "Remove", alongside reflections on May's events and Palestine's history writ large. A revised version of "Remove" is included in [...] as one of the many poems sharing the book's name.

== Critical reception ==
Diaz, Pardlo, And Seuss, in awarding him the 2024 Jackson Poetry Prize for the book, lauded Joudah's "lyrical gift" and "his courage to speak in the face of the unspeakable, in poems of lyric concision and intensity". The book was shortlisted for the 2024 Forward Prize for Best Collection.

Some critics observed the relevance of Joudah's poems to the ongoing Israeli–Palestinian conflict but were careful not to pigeonhole them to any one historical moment. The Chicago Review of Books called the book a "new, exceptionally present, and unforgettable collection" and stated it was "indicative of Joudah's poetic prowess that these poems are as immediate as the destruction still facing Palestinians as I write this, and also have a timeless nature." The Los Angeles Review of Books wrote that "One of the most striking aspects of the book is the oracularity of the voice, which speaks from and into the unseeable and unspeakable". The Cleveland Review of Books argued that "Joudah's poetry partially rejects significance grafted onto its language simply for responding to an event as it presently unfolds."

Many critics analyzed the title's use of punctuation. The Michigan Quarterly Review opined that "Joudah's chosen title and its unspeakability capture the lacuna of the present moment, both mirroring and indicting the unwillingness of American discourse, at least, to make declarations about an ongoing genocide." AGNI said the title "sets the tone: this is a text designed to disarm and unsettle. To embody the erased, the unsayable." The Green Linden Review argued it as "ellipsis and suspension points, omission and uncertainty, a fitting gesture for a book published during an active genocide by the Israeli government against the Palestinian people." The Markaz Review saw it as a metaphor for silence and censorship.

The Guardian selected one of Joudah's "[...]" poems for its poem of the week column in September 2024.
