= Judith Emlyn Johnson =

American poet

Judith Emlyn Johnson (formerly Judith Johnson Sherwin) (born 1936) is an American poet.

== Life ==
She graduated from Barnard College cum laude. She studied at Columbia University, Radcliffe College, and the Juilliard School of Music.

She teaches at State University of New York at Albany. She was President of the Board of Association of Writers & Writing Programs, and President of the Poetry Society of America. She edited 13th Moon, and published The Little Magazine.

Her work appeared in Atlantic Monthly, Chelsea, Harper's, Ms., New York Times, Nimrod, Playboy. Her intermedia installation / performance piece, "Friedrich Liebermann, American Artist," has been widely exhibited, and is now being developed as a multi-media cd-rom novel. Her play manuscript "Belisa's Love" is in the Princeton University archives.

She lives in New York City.

== Awards ==
- 1969 Yale Series of Younger Poets Competition
- Playboy fiction award
- National Endowment for the Arts Poetry Fellowship
- Poetry Society of America Di Castagnola Prize.

== Works ==
- "The Prospector's Complaint: Happy Jack's Rock" Beloit Poetry Journal, Winter 1967–68, p. 34-35
- "Sorry, Sweetheart, Here's" Beloit Poetry Journal, Spring 1972
- "The House Guest"; "Time for Ripeness", Mother Jones, July 1977
- "Before the Recovery", Virginia Quarterly Review, Summer 1979
- "Under the Lights", Ploughshares, Winter 1989
- Cities of Mathematics and Desire: Poems (Sheep Meadow Press, 2005)
- The Ice Lizard: Poems (Sheep Meadow Press, 1992) ISBN 978-1-878818-17-1
- Dead 's Good Company (Waste Trilogy III) (Countryman Press, 1979)
- How the Dead Count: Poems (Norton, 1978) ISBN 978-0-393-04491-1
- Transparencies: Poems (Waste Trilogy II) (Countryman Press, 1978)
- The Town Scold: Poems (Waste Trilogy I) (Countryman Press, 1977)
- Impossible Buildings: Poems (Doubleday, 1972)
- The Life of Riot: Short Stories (Atheneum, 1970)
- Uranium Poems (Yale University Press, 1969)

=== Editor ===
- Brenda S. Webster; Judith Emlyn Johnson, eds. (1993). Hungry for light: the journal of Ethel Schwabacher. Indiana University Press. ISBN 978-0-253-36367-1.
