= Joan Vincent Murray =

American poet

Joan Murray
- Born: February 12, 1917; London, England
- Died: January 4, 1942 (aged 24); Saranac Lake, New York, U.S.
- Education: The New School
- Writing career
- Genre: poetry
- Notable awards: Yale Series of Younger Poets Competition

Joan Vincent Murray (February 12, 1917 – January 4, 1942) was a Canadian American poet.

She studied at The New School, with W. H. Auden.

Her papers are at Smith College.

== Awards ==
- 1947 Yale Series of Younger Poets Competition, selected by W. H. Auden

== Works ==
- Poems (PDF). Yale University Press. 1947. Archived from the original on 2006-08-21.
- Poems : 1917 - 1942 / Joan Murray. Ed. by Grant Code; with a foreword by W.H. Auden, New York : AMS Pr., 1971, ISBN 978-0-404-53845-3
- Drafts, fragments, and poems : the complete poetry, Farnoosh Fathi (Ed.), John Ashbery (Foreword) New York : New York Review Books 2017, ISBN 978-1-68137-182-5
