= Nick Samaras =

American poet

- Born: 1952 (age 73–74); Foxton, Cambridgeshire
- Education: Columbia University; University of Denver
- Writing career
- Genre: Poetry

Nick Samaras (Greek: Νικ Σαμαράς; born 1952) is a poet and essayist. His first book of poetry, Hands of the Saddlemaker received the Yale Series of Younger Poets Award.

== Biography ==
Samaras is the son of Bishop Kallistos Samaras, a prominent Greek Orthodox Clergyman and theologian. He was born in Foxton, Cambridgeshire, England, living there and on the island of Patmos, Greece. At the time of the political Greek junta military dictatorship, he was brought in exile to be raised further in America, via previous living in Turkey, Wales, Brussels, Switzerland, Italy, Austria, Germany, Yugoslavia, and Jerusalem. He later settled in Woburn, Massachusetts, his father's home town.

He earned his MFA from Columbia University, and his doctorate from the University of Denver. His individual poems have been featured in The New Yorker, The New York Times, The Paris Review, Poetry, The New Republic, Kenyon Review, and many other publications. Currently, he lives in West Nyack, New York.

== Works ==
- Hands of the Saddlemaker New Haven : Yale University Press, 1992. ISBN 9780300054576, OCLC 24376065
- American Psalm, World Psalm Ashland Poetry Press, 2014. ISBN 978-0-912592-76-3
