= Pamela Alexander =

American poet

- Born: 1948 (age 77–78); Natick, Massachusetts, USA
- Education: Iowa Writers Workshop
- Occupations: Poet, writer, editor

Pamela Alexander (born 1948) is an American poet and editor.

== Life ==
She graduated from Bates College in 1970 and from the Iowa Writers' Workshop with a Master of Fine Arts in 1973. She has taught at MIT and Oberlin College.

== Career ==
Alexander is the author of four books of poetry. Her first book, Navigable Waterways, won the 1984 Yale Younger Poets Series.

Her work has appeared in journals including The New Yorker, Atlantic Monthly, Boston Book Review, Orion, TriQuarterly, Poetry, The Journal, New Republic, American Scholar.

Her papers are held at Bates College.

She was an associate editor of FIELD: Contemporary Poetry and Poetics.

== Awards ==
- 1996 Iowa Poetry Prize
- 1984 Yale Younger Poet award, Selected by James Merrill
- Fine Arts Work Center Fellowship
- Bunting Institute of Radcliffe College Fellowship
- Ohio Arts Council grant

== Books ==
=== Poetry ===
- Slow Fire. Ausable Press. 2007. ISBN 978-1-931337-34-2.
- Inland. University of Iowa Press. 1997. ISBN 978-0-87745-582-0.
- Commonwealth of Wings. Wesleyan University Press. 1991. ISBN 978-0-8195-1193-5.
- Navigable Waterways. Yale University Press. 1985. ISBN 978-0-300-03331-1.

=== Anthologies ===
- David Walker, ed. (2006). American Alphabets: 25 Contemporary Poets. Oberlin College Press. ISBN 978-0-932440-28-0.
- Dove, Rita; Lehman, David, eds. (2000). "Semiotics". Best American Poetry 2000. Simon and Schuster. ISBN 978-0-7432-0033-2.
- The Extraordinary Tide
- American Voices
- Poetry for a Small Planet
- Cape Discovery
- Melissa Tuckey, ed. (2018). Ghost Fishing: An Eco-Justice Poetry Anthology. University of Georgia Press. ISBN 978-0820353159.
