= Leslie Ullman =

American poet and professor (born 1947)

Leslie Ullman (born 1947) is an American poet and professor. She is the author of four poetry collections, most recently, Progress on the Subject of Immensity (University of New Mexico Press, 2013). Her third book, Slow Work Through Sand (University of Iowa Press, 1997), was co-winner of the 1997 Iowa Poetry Prize. Other honors include winning the 1978 Yale Series of Younger Poets Competition for her first book, Natural Histories, and two NEA fellowships. Her poems have been published in literary journals and magazines including The New Yorker, Poetry, The Kenyon Review, Puerto Del Sol, Blue Mesa Review, and in anthologies including Five Missouri Poets (Chariton Review Press, 1979).

== Biography ==
Ullman was born in Illinois and graduated from Skidmore College. She earned her MFA from University of Iowa Writers' Workshop. She established, taught at, and for many years directed the bilingual MFA in Creative Writing Program at the University of Texas at El Paso, where she remains a professor emerita. She is currently on the faculty of the Vermont College of Fine Arts MFA in the Creative Writing Program, and lives in northern New Mexico, with her husband, Erik Ranger.

== Bibliography ==
- Unruly Tree ( University of New Mexico Press, 2024)
- Little Soul and the Selves (3:ATaos Press, 2023)
- The You That All Along Has Housed You 9Nine Mile Press, 2019)
- Library of Small Happiness (3:A Taos Press, 2017)
- Progress on the Subject of Immensity (University of New Mexico Press, 2013)
- Slow Work Through Sand (University of Iowa Press, 1997)
- Dreams by No One's Daughter (University of Pittsburgh Press, 1987)
- Natural Histories (Yale University Press, 1979)

== Honors and awards ==
- 1997 Iowa Poetry Prize
- 1989 National Endowment for the Arts Fellowship
- 1976 National Endowment for the Arts Fellowship
- 1978 Yale Series of Younger Poets Competition
