= Helen Chasin =

American poet (1938–2015)

- Born: July 23, 1938; New York City, U.S.
- Died: June 10, 2015 (aged 76); New York City, U.S.
- Education: Midwood High School; Radcliffe College
- Occupation: Poet

Helen S. Chasin (July 23, 1938 – June 10, 2015) was an American poet.

== Life ==
Chasin grew up in Brooklyn, New York.

She attended Radcliffe College and studied with Robert Fitzgerald, Robert Lowell, and John Nims. She taught at Emerson College, where Thomas Lux was her student.

In 1973, she edited Iowa Review.

Her work appeared in The Missouri Review. New York Quarterly, Paris Review,

She lived in Rockport, Massachusetts. She died June 10, 2015, in New York City.

== Awards ==
- 1968 Yale Series of Younger Poets Competition
- 1968 Bread Loaf Fellow
- 1968 to 1970 Bunting Institute fellow

== Works ==
- "Joy Sonnet in a Random Universe", Blue Ridge Journal
- Casting Stones. Little, Brown. 1975. ISBN 978-0-316-13822-2.
- Coming Close (Yale University Press, 1968) reprint. AMS Press. 1976. ISBN 978-0-404-53863-7.
- "The Word Plum"

=== Anthologies ===
- Bradley, George, ed. (March 30, 1998). The Yale Younger Poets Anthology. Yale University Press. ISBN 978-0-300-07472-7.
- Booth, Alison; Hunter, J. Paul; Mays, Kelly J., eds. (October 5, 2006). The Norton Introduction to Poetry. W. W. Norton & Company. ISBN 978-0-393-92857-0.
- Mieder, Wolfgang, ed. (February 1, 1988). Disenchantments: An Anthology of Modern Fairy Tale Poetry. Vermont. ISBN 978-0-87451-440-7.
