= Ken Chen =

American poet and lawyer (born 1979)

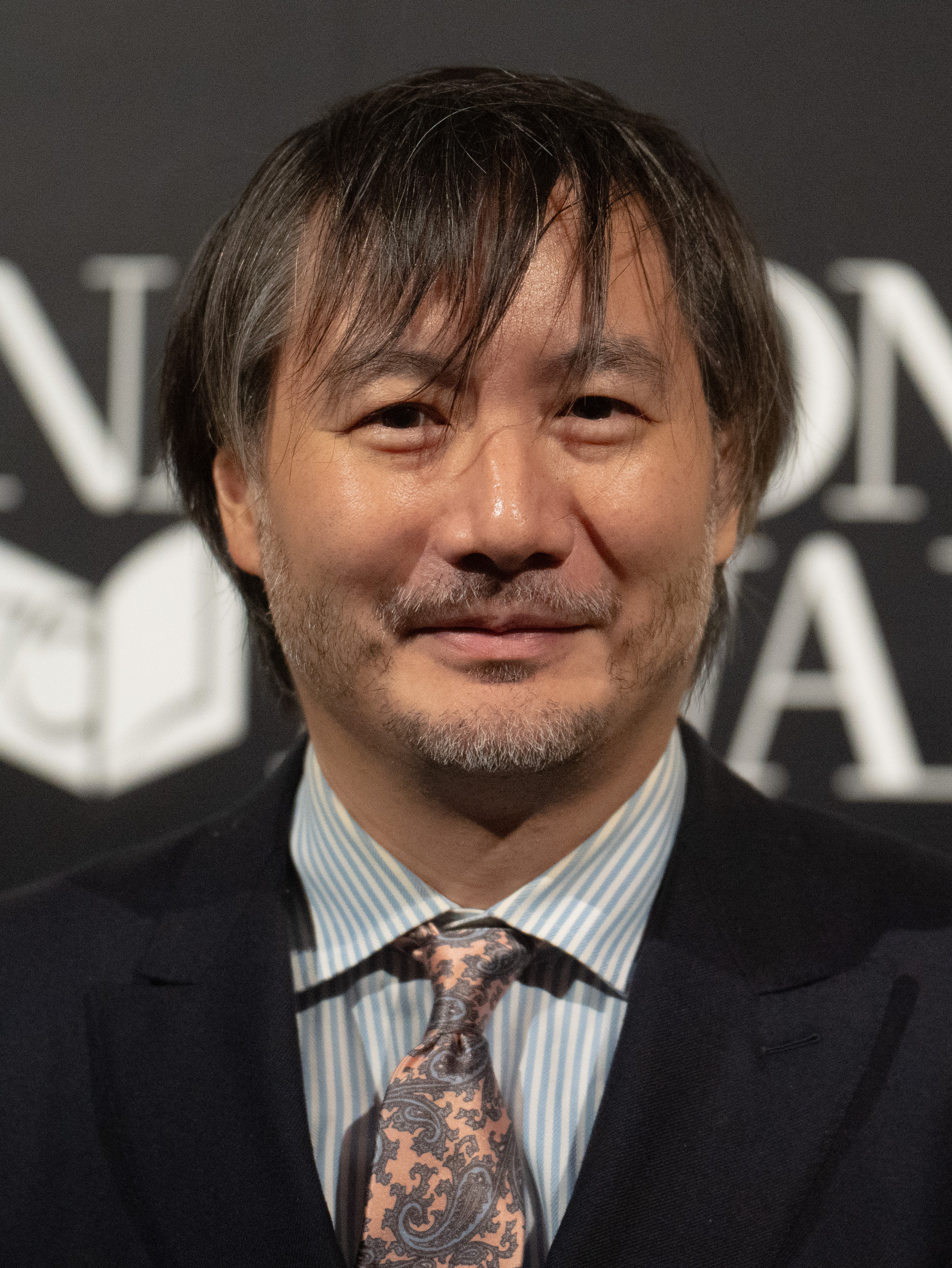
- Chen in 2024
- Born: 1979 (age 46–47); San Diego, California, U.S.
- Education: University of California, Berkeley (BA); Yale University (JD)
- Occupations: Poet; lawyer

Ken Chen (born 1979) is an American poet and lawyer.

== Early life and education ==
Chen was born in 1979 in San Diego, California, to a Taiwanese American family. Chen's parents are immigrants from Taiwan. Chen grew up in the San Francisco Bay Area.

In 2001, Chen graduated from the University of California, Berkeley, with his Bachelor of Arts degree in English literature. As an undergraduate, he earned the university's Kenneth Priestley Award, given for highest distinction in leadership. Chen then attended Yale Law School and earned his Juris Doctor (J.D.) from Yale in 2005.

== Career ==
Chen was an editor of Arts & Letters Daily while at Berkeley and worked at Hughes Hubbard & Reed LLP in New York City after law school. He was the Executive Director of the Asian American Writers' Workshop. from 2008 to 2019. He is currently an Assistant Professor and the Associate Director of Creative Writing at Barnard College.

His writing has been published in Art Asia Pacific, Boston Review of Books, Manoa, Field, Pleiades, and Barrow Street, Bridge, Radical Society, 5 Fingers Review, and Palimpsest.

His poetry collection Juvenilia was selected as the winner of the 2010 Yale Series of Younger Poets competition by Louise Glück, who wrote, "The miracle of this book is the degree to which Ken Chen manages to be both exhilaratingly modern (anti-catharsis, anti-epiphany) while at the same time never losing his attachment to voice, and the implicit claims of voice: these are poems of intense feeling. . . . Like only the best poets, Ken Chen makes with his voice a new category."

== Personal life ==
Chen lives in Brooklyn, New York.

== Awards ==
- 2010 Yale Series of Younger Poets Competition

== Works ==
- Juvenilia. Yale University Press. April 2010. ISBN 978-0-300-16007-9.
- Best American Essays 2006. Houghton Mifflin. 2006. ISBN 978-0-618-70529-0.
