= Thomas Hornsby Ferril =

American poet

Thomas Hornsby Ferril (February 25, 1896 – October 27, 1988) was a poet in the U.S. state of Colorado. A journalist who specialized in corporate public relations, he studied and wrote poetry as an avocation. In his later years of life (1979–1988) he was named poet laureate of Colorado. Colorado Creative Industries has called him "Colorado's most celebrated poet." Carl Sandburg called him "The Poet of the Rockies".

== Biography ==
Born in 1896, Ferril was educated at Colorado College, married journalist Helen Ferril, and made his life in Denver, Colorado. Supporting his household as the director of public relations at the Great Western Sugar Company, he also wrote poetry and essays. His first collection of verses, High Passage (1926), was honored by the Yale Series of Younger Poets Competition. It was followed by Westering (1934), Trial by Time (1944), New and Selected Poems (1952), Words for Denver: and Other Poems (1966), and Anvil of Roses (1983).

Ferril wrote extensively for his wife Helen's weekly, The Rocky Mountain Herald. They published I Hate Thursday (1946), and The Rocky Mountain Herald Reader (1966).

== Legacy ==
Ferril was selected as the author of the cycle of verse that captions the murals by Allen Tupper True that decorate the first- floor rotunda of the Colorado State Capitol in Denver (painted 1934–1940). Ferril was awarded the Oscar Blumenthal Poetry Prize, the Academy of American Poets Award, the Robert Frost Poetry Award, and the Ridgely Torrence Memorial Award. A selection of his works was republished as Thomas Hornsby Ferril and the American West (1996). His papers have been archived in the Denver Public Library.

== External Sources ==
Articles in Western American Literature on Thomas Hornsby Ferril
