= Yanyi =

American poet and critic

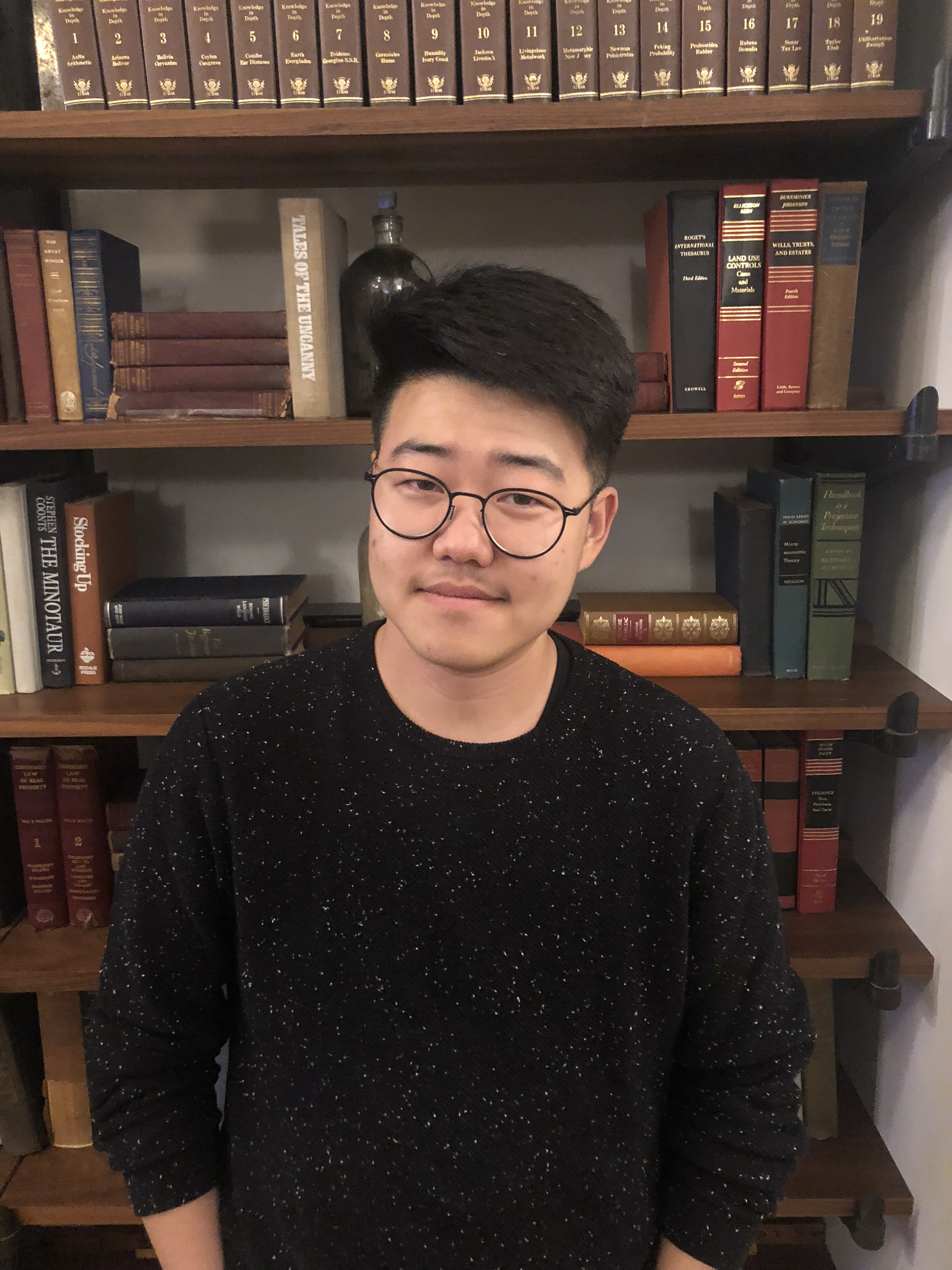
- Yanyi at the Kundiman & Wikimedia NYC Edit-a-Thon for Asian American Literature, The Ace Hotel New York, May 2019
- Education: Columbia University (BA); New York University (MFA)
- Writing career
- Notable awards: Yale Series of Younger Poets (2018)

Yanyi is an American poet and critic. He won the Yale Series of Younger Poets Prize in 2018 for his first book, The Year of Blue Water.

== Life ==
Yanyi graduated from Columbia University in 2013. He is an associate editor at Foundry and an MFA candidate at New York University. He was an Asian American Writers' Workshop Margins Fellow in 2017–2018. He was a 2015 Poets House Emerging Poets Fellow. He was a 2019 James Merrill House Fellow.

== The Year of Blue Water ==
In 2018, Yanyi's manuscript was selected as the winner of the Yale Series of Younger Poets Prize. Carl Phillips, the judge for the competition, said of his manuscript: “As its title implies, ‘The Year of Blue Water’ reads as a record of time, a kind of daybook of observations in sentences so crystalline, spare, direct, and yet offhand, that it can be easy to miss, at first, the book's complexity...The poems...[invite] us into the life they invoke, a life that both argues for and is an example of how identity is multifaceted: the poems’ speaker is an artist, of an apparent immigrant background, is trans, is deeply invested in friendship as a rescuing form of community. Identity, then, as not any one of these things but all of them, each marker of identity at once incidental and essential.”

Identity features prominently in Yanyi's work, who said of this collection, "What I was writing had to be free from the idea of it being a product—free of the idea that it would educate people about what it's like to be a queer and trans Chinese-American person in the world."

== Later works ==
In 2022, Dream of the Divided Field was published. Yanyi said, "The book asks the larger question of how one retains or has a self between two moments in time. It asks if it is possible for that same person to exist."

== Works ==
- The Year of Blue Water, Yale University Press 2019. ISBN 9780300242645, OCLC 1107128416
- Dream of the Divided Field Penguin Random House (One World) 2022. ISBN 978-0-593-23099-2
