= The Earth in the Attic =

2008 debut poetry collection by Fady Joudah

- Author: Fady Joudah
- Publisher: Yale University Press
- Publication date: April 15, 2008
- Pages: 96
- Awards: Yale Younger Poets Prize
- ISBN: 978-0300134315
- Followed by: Alight

The Earth in the Attic is a 2008 debut poetry collection by Palestinian American poet Fady Joudah; at the time, Joudah was a medical doctor and had worked with Doctors Without Borders since 2001. The book was published by Yale University Press after Louise Glück had selected it for the Yale Younger Poets Prize in 2007.

== Contents ==
Joudah was born in Austin, Texas to Palestinian parents. Later practicing medicine, he worked in hospitals in Houston, Zambia, Darfur, and other places, with much involvement in Doctors Without Borders. Accordingly, Joudah's poems concern Joudah's experiences regarding identity and history, as well as broader themes of war and religion. In her foreword, Glück called the book "varied, coherent, fierce, tender; impossible to put down, impossible to forget."

== Critical reception ==
The Guardian called the book "an original and moving first collection" with "urgency and clarity" regarding Joudah's experiences as both a Palestinian American and also someone working in medicine. The reviewer noted Joudah's writing as one with "carefully balanced lyric" and observed the movement of his poems. Fogged Clarity called the Joudah's debut "a book that will long continue to warrant reading" and compared his work to Thomas Wolfe, Yusef Komunyakaa, Betty Adcock, James Dickey, and others who have "written about their home as a far away psychological country."
