= Ghassan Zaqtan =

Palestinian poet

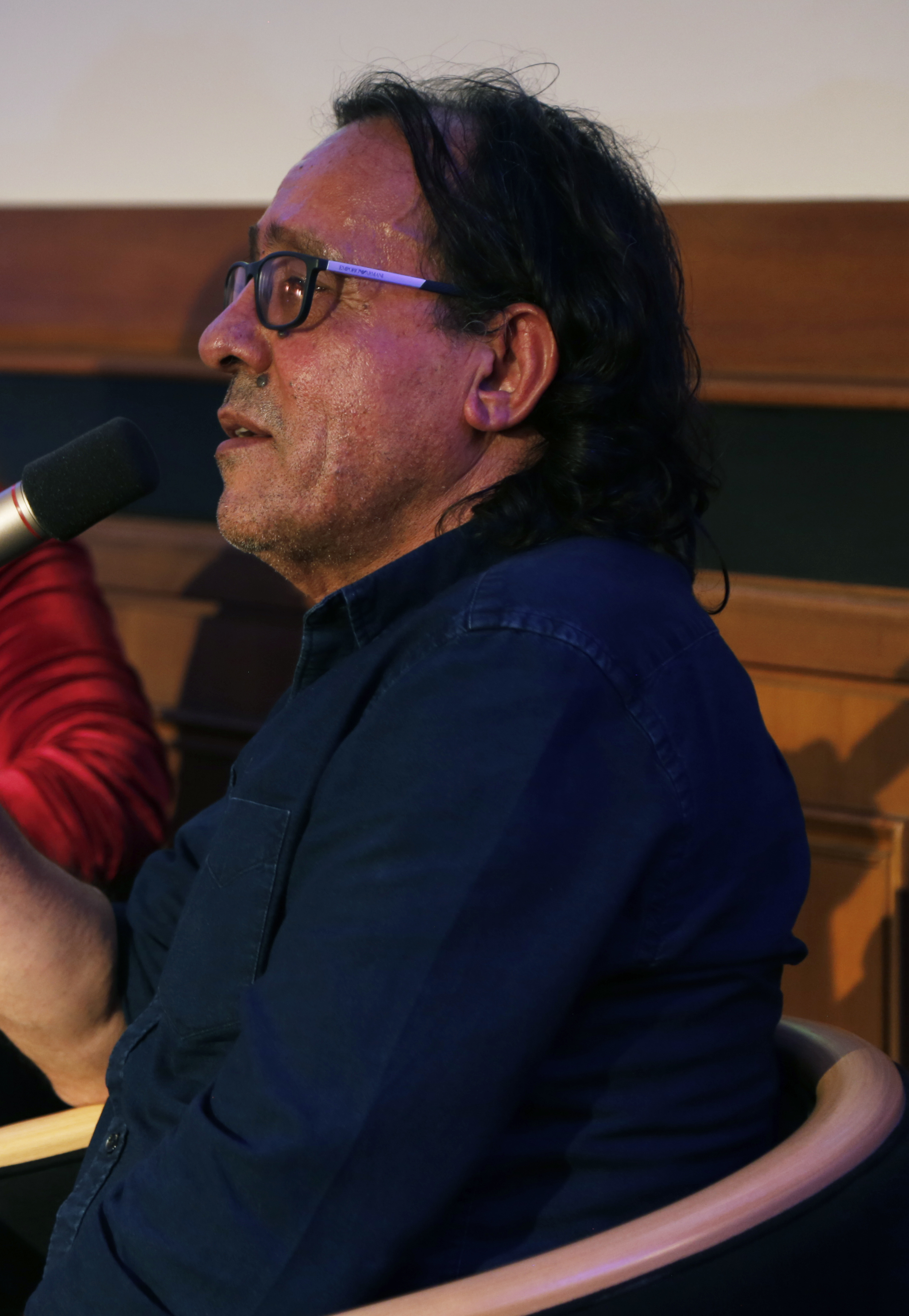
- Born: 1954 (age 71–72); Beit Jala, West Bank
- Education: Teachers Training College, Nu'ur, Jordan
- Occupations: Poet, novelist, editor, cultural administrator
- Writing career
- Language: Arabic

Ghassan Zaqtan (Arabic: غسان زقطان; born 1954) is a Palestinian poet, author of ten collections of poetry. He is also a novelist, editor. He was born in Beit Jala, near Bethlehem, and has lived in Jordan, Beirut, Damascus, and Tunis. His book “Like a Straw Bird it Follows me” translated by Fady Joudah was awarded the 2013 International Griffin Poetry Prize. His most recent book of poetry, The Silence That Remains, also translated by Fady Joudah, was published in 2017 by Copper Canyon Press.

His name appeared twice among the short-listed award winners of the Neustadt International Prize for Literature in the years of 2014, 2016 by the University of Oklahoma, perceived as the American Nobel Prize.

In recognition of his achievement and contribution to Arabic and Palestinian literature, Ghassan Zaqtan was awarded the National Medal of Honor by the Palestinian president.

Zaqtan, who is also the winner of the Mahmoud Darwish Excellence Award in 2016 (along with Lebanese Elias Khoury and American Alice Walker) was awarded Lebanese poet Anwar Salman's poetry award in 2019 at a ceremony held at the American University of Beirut, Lebanon.

In June 2013, his name appeared for the first time among the speculation list for the Nobel Prize Literature for the fall of 2013. Ghassan Zaqtan's work has been translated to English, French, Italian, Norwegian, Turkish, German, and other languages.

== Early life ==
He was born in 1954 in Beit Jala, West Bank. His father, Khalil Zaqtan, was a poet. From 1960 to 1967, he lived at Karameh. He graduated from Teachers Training College, Nu'ur, Jordan. From 1973 to 1979, he was a physical education teacher. He was editor of El-Bayader. He was director general of Literature and Publishing Department, of the Palestinian Ministry of Culture. He was the editor of Al-Shu’ara from 2000 to 2004 and director of the House of Poetry. He is a consultant for cultural policies in the Welfare Association and is a member of the executive board of the Mahmoud Darwish Foundation. Zaqtan writes a weekly column in Al-Ayyam newspaper. His work appeared in Triquarterly. He lives in Ramallah.

== Visa Controversy ==
In 2012, a reading at the New York State Writers Institute was canceled after visa delays.

In 2013, he was denied an entry visa to Canada. After a protest by prominent writers, his visa was granted.

== Works ==
Poetry

• Early Morning (1980) • Old Reasons (1982) • Flags (1984) • The Heroism of Things (1988) • Ordering Descriptions: Selected Poems (1998) • Not for my Sake (1990) • Luring the Mountain (1999) • A Biography by Coal (2003) • Like a Straw Bird it Follows Me (2008) • The Silence That Remains (Copper Canyon Press, 2017)

Novels

• Light Sky (1992) • Describing the Past (1995) • Old Carriage with Curtains (2011)

Plays

- Light Sky (2005)

Poetry Anthology

Le poeme palestinien contemporain (French Edition)

=== Works in English ===
- Ghassan Zaqtan (24 April 2012). Like a Straw Bird It Follows Me: And Other Poems. Yale University Press. ISBN 978-0-300-17316-1.
