= Alan Dugan =

American poet (1923–2003)

- Born: February 12, 1923; Brooklyn, New York
- Died: September 3, 2003 (aged 80); Hyannis, Massachusetts
- Occupation: Poet

Alan Dugan (February 12, 1923 – September 3, 2003) was an American poet.

His first volume Poems published in 1961 was a chosen by the Yale Series of Younger Poets and went on to win the National Book Award for Poetry and the Pulitzer Prize for Poetry. His last volume, entitled Poems Seven: New and Complete Poetry, was published in 2001 by Seven Stories Press in New York City and won Dugan a second National Book Award.

== Life ==
Dugan grew up in Jamaica, Queens, and served in World War II, experiences which entered his poetry, though he was not a confessional poet. After attending Queens College for two years, he was drafted into the army. In 1951, he earned a BA from Mexico City College. Dugan taught at Sarah Lawrence College, Connecticut College, and the University of Colorado.

Dugan's work was published in successive numbered collections under the simple title Poems.

Alan Dugan was married to the artist Judith Shahn, to whom he dedicated each of his books. He died on September 3, 2003, of pneumonia at age 80. He lived in Truro, Massachusetts on Cape Cod, where he was a member of the Writing Committee of the Fine Arts Work Center.

== Awards ==
Dugan received many awards and fellowships for his poetry.

- Poems (1961): Yale Series of Younger Poets, National Book Award for Poetry, Pulitzer Prize for Poetry.
- Poems Seven: New and Complete Poetry (2001): National Book Award.
- Two Guggenheim Fellowships (1963), (1972)
- A Rockefeller Fellowship (1966)
- Awarded the Prix De Rome by the National Institute of Arts and Letters (1962)
- The Shelley Memorial Award: Poetry Society of America (1982)
- The Award in Literature: American Academy and Institute of Arts and Letters (1985)
- Awarded the Lannan Literary Award for Poetry in 2002.

== Works ==
- Poems (1961)
- Poems 2 (1963)
- Poems 3 (1967)
- Poems 4 (1974)
- Poems Five: New and Collected Poems (1983)
- Poems Six (1989)
- Poems Seven: New and Complete Poetry (2001)

== See also ==
- American poetry
- List of poets from the United States
