= Howard Buck (poet) =

American poet and critic

- Born: Howard Swazey Buck; October 23, 1894; Chicago, Illinois, U.S.
- Died: August 15, 1947 (aged 52); Elgin, Illinois, U.S.
- Education: Yale University; Phillips Andover; University High School
- Occupations: Poet; critic; professor; painter
- Employers: American Expeditionary Forces; Yale University; The University of Chicago
- Known for: The Tempering: Leaves from a Notebook (1919); A Study in Smollett (1925); Smollett as Poet (1927)
- Parent(s): Carl Darling Buck; Clarinda Darling (Swazey) Buck
- Awards: 1919 Yale Series of Younger Poets Competition
- Honors: Croix de Guerre

Howard Swazey Buck (October 23, 1894 – August 15, 1947) was an American poet and critic.

== Life ==
He graduated from Yale University in 1916, where he contributed light verse to campus humor magazine The Yale Record.

During World War I, he was in the American Expeditionary Forces.

== Awards ==
- 1919 Yale Series of Younger Poets Competition

== Works ==
- The Tempering: Leaves from a Notebook. Yale University Press. 1919. "Howard Buck (poet)." reprint. BiblioBazaar, LLC. 2009. ISBN 978-1-110-96074-3.
- A Study in Smollett: chiefly "Peregrine Pickle", Howard Swazey Buck, Philip Hamilton, Yale university press, 1925
- Smollett as poet, Yale University Press, 1927
