= Saigoneer =

Digital news site

- Type: Digital
- Owner(s): Urbanist Network
- Editor-in-chief: Khôi Phạm
- Founded: 2012; 13 years ago
- Language: English, Vietnamese, Korean
- Headquarters: Ho Chi Minh City, Vietnam
- Website: saigoneer.com

Saigoneer is a digital news site based in Ho Chi Minh City, Vietnam. Founded in 2012 by Brian Letwin and Alberto Prieto, Saigoneer hosts daily news reporting, original, and branded content in English, Vietnamese, and Korean. In January 2018, Saigoneer launched the Saigoneer Podcast, one of the first English podcasts produced in Vietnam.

Saigoneer profiles street food culture in Saigon (Hẻm Gems) and Hanoi (Ngõ Nooks).
