= Kolkata Poetry Confluence =

International multilingual literary festival

- Genre: Poetry, Translation, Literature
- Frequency: Annual (presumably)
- Locations: Kolkata, West Bengal, India

Kolkata Poetry Confluence is an international multilingual literary fest bringing together poets, translators, poetry publishers and poetry lovers at Kolkata. The event is organised by Antonym Magazine and Bhasha Samsad also includes a poetry book fair.

== Organisers ==
The main organisers of the Confluence are Antonym Magazine and Bhasha Samsad publishers.

== Participants ==
The Confluence is attended by poets and translators in different languages from all over the world. Participants also included leading film and media persons like Sudeshna Roy, Anindya Chatterjee, Abhijit Guha, and Srijato.

== The 2022 Event ==
The Kolkata Poetry Confluence 2022 was organised from June 11-13, 2022 on the theme of "inclusivity". Professor Chaiti Mitra was Director of the Confluence. :-

== Award winners ==
Kolkata Poetry Confluence gave away Jibanananda Das Award and Sonali Ghoshal Award for outstanding works of poetry translation from Indian languages into English. The following are the Jibanananda Das award winners :-

- Assamese :- Harshita Hiya for translating Sameer Tanti
- Bengali :- Indrani Bhattacharya for translating Mohammad Nurul Huda
- Hindi :- Pallavi Singh for translating Anamika
- Kashmiri :- Mohammad Zahid for Naseem Shafaie
- Marathi :- Santosh Rathod for translating Santosh Pawar
- Odia :- Snehaprava Das for translating Saroj Bal
- Tamil :- Deepalakshmi Joseph for translating Sukirtharani
- Urdu :- Tapan Kumar Pradhan for translating Munawwar Rana
