= 2022 in poetry =

Major poetry related events taking place worldwide during 2022 are outlined below under different sections. These include poetry books released during the year in different languages, major poetry awards, poetry festivals and events, besides anniversaries and deaths of renowned poets etc. Nationality words link to articles with information on the nation's poetry or literature (for instance, India or France).

== Events ==
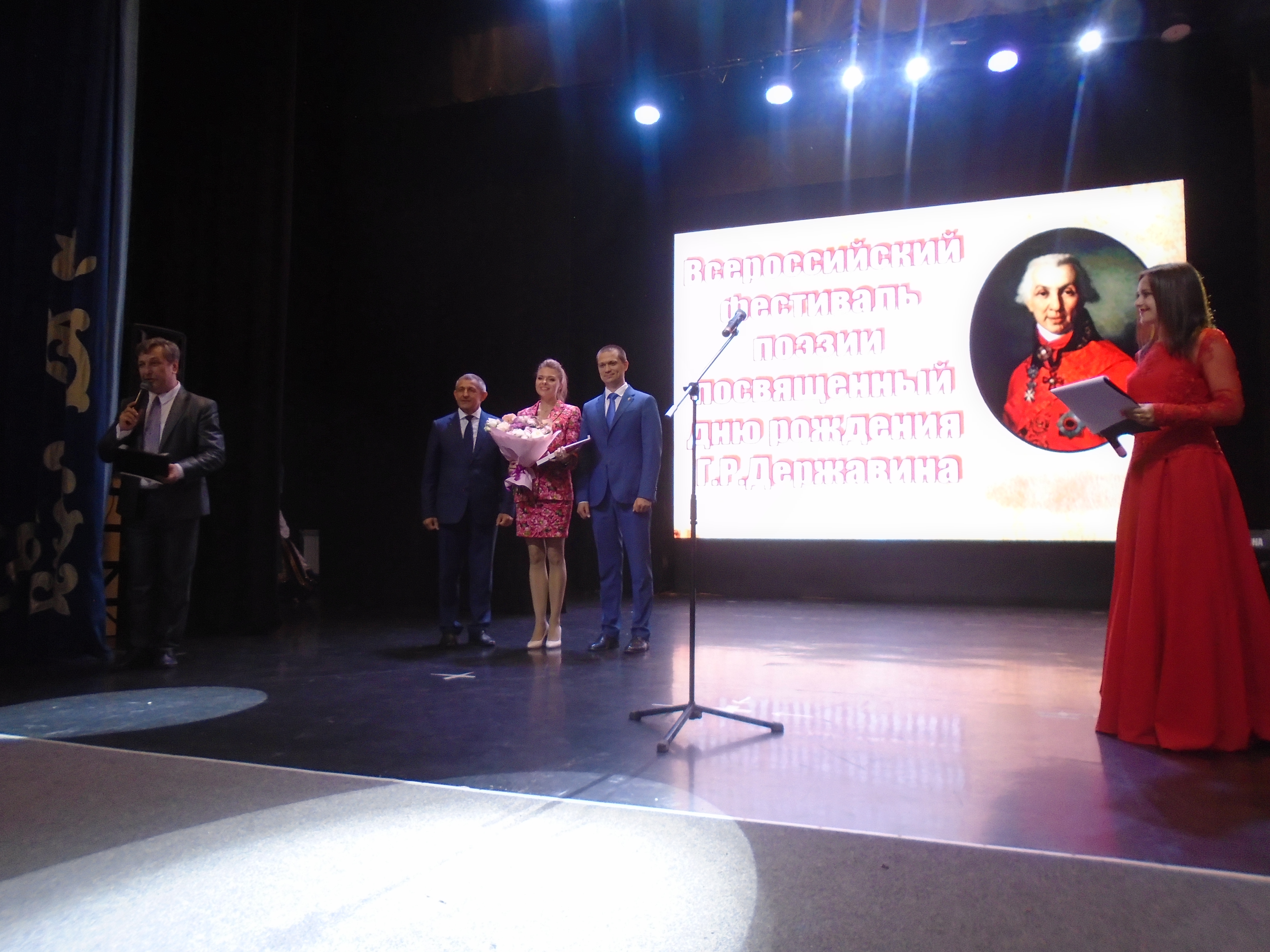
The Derzhavin poetry festival, held in July 2022 in Laishevo, Russia

- April 30 – Sierra Poetry festival is organised in Nevada City, California. The theme for this year is "On the Wings of Words".
- June 10 – A three-day international get together of poets and poetry translators titled Kolkata Poetry Confluence is organised in Kolkata, India by Antonym and Bhasha Sansad publishers.
- June 12 – Queensland Poetry Festival kicks off with this year's theme "Emerge" with live performances by Lorna Munro and Ethan Enoch-Barlow. The program also has special sessions on the LGBTQ community.
- September 25 – The Mayakovsky Square poetry readings are revived in Triumfalnaya Square, Moscow, in protest against the Russian invasion of Ukraine. The following year, Russian poets Artyom Kamardin, Yegor Shtovba and Nikolai Dayneko are given severe prison sentences for participating or attending.
- December 7 – The End Poem is released into the public domain using a CC0 license dedication by its author, Julian Gough.

== Selection of works published in English ==
=== Australia ===
- Brook Emery, Sea Scale: New & Selected Poems, Puncher and Wattmann. ISBN 978-1-9225-7109-0
- Les Murray, Continuous Creation

=== Canada ===
- Sarah de Leeuw, Lot

=== India ===
- Gopi Kottoor, Ramanan : The Pastoral

=== Lebanon ===
- Zeina Hashem Beck, 0

=== New Zealand ===
- Lang Leav, Lullabies

=== Nigeria ===
- Akwaeke Emezi, Content Warning : Everything

=== Puerto Rico ===
- Raquel Salas Rivera, Before Island is Volcano

=== United Kingdom ===
- Warsan Shire, Bless the Daughter Raised by a Voice in Her Head

==== England ====
- Eavan Boland, The Historians
- Victoria Adukwei Bulley, Quiet
- Amanda Gorman, The Hill We Climb
- Ella Risbridger, Set Me on Fire

==== Criticism, scholarship and biography in the United Kingdom ====
- Katherine Rundell, Super-Infinite: The Transformations of John Donne

=== United States ===
Alphabetical listing by author name

- Victoria Chang, Trees Witness Everything
- Jos Charles, A Year and Other Poems
- Amanda Gorman, The Hill We Climb
- Ada Limon, The Hurting Kind
- Robert Wood Lynn, Mothman Apologia
- Roger Reeves, Best Barbarians
- Solmaz Sharif, Customs

==== Anthologies in the United States ====
- Kimiko Hahn & Harold Schechter (eds), Buzz Words: Poems About Insects

=== Viet Nam ===
Ocean Vuong, Time is a Mother

== Works published in other languages ==
=== French ===
- Abdellatif Laâbi, Le Castor astral
- Markus Hediger, Dans le cendrier du temps, Publisher: Éditions de l'Aire; ISBN 2889562220

== Awards and honors by country ==
- See also: List of poetry awards

Awards announced this year:

=== International ===
- Struga Poetry Evenings Golden Wreath Laureate: Shuntaro Tanikawa
- Struga Poetry Evenings Bridges of Struga for the best debut: Gerardo Masuccio for "Fin Qui Visse Un Uomo"

=== Australia awards and honors ===
- Victorian Premier's Prize for Poetry: Maria Takolander for Trigger Warning
- Kenneth Slessor Prize for Poetry:

=== Canada awards and honors ===
- Archibald Lampman Award: '
- J. M. Abraham Poetry Award:
- Governor General's Awards:
- Griffin Poetry Prize: Douglas Kearney for "Sho"
- Latner Writers' Trust Poetry Prize:
- Gerald Lampert Award:
- Pat Lowther Award:
- Prix Alain-Grandbois:
- Raymond Souster Award:
- Dorothy Livesay Poetry Prize:
- Prix Émile-Nelligan:

=== France awards and honors ===
- Prix Goncourt de la Poésie:
- Prix Guillaume Apollinaire: Denise Desautels for Disparaître (Editions du Noroît / L'herbe qui tremble)

=== India awards and honors ===
- Sahitya Akademi Award :- Youth Award (English) for "Tales of Hazaribagh" by Mihir Vatsa
- Jnanpith Award :- Damodar Mauzo for Konkani novels
- Moortidevi Award :-
- Saraswati Samman :- Ram Darash Mishra
- Jibanananda Das Award :- Pallavi Singh & Anamika for Hindi; Snehaprava Das & Saroj Bal for Odia; Tapan Kumar Pradhan & Munawwar Rana for Urdu

=== New Zealand awards and honors ===
- Prime Minister's Awards for Literary Achievement:
  - Poetry:
- Mary and Peter Biggs Award for Poetry :

=== United Kingdom awards and honors ===
- Cholmondeley Award: Menna Elfyn
- Costa Book Award for poetry:
- English Association's Fellows' Poetry Prizes:
- Eric Gregory Award (for a collection of poems by a poet under the age of 30):
- Forward Poetry Prize:
  - Short List:
  - Best Collection:
  - Best Poem:
- Jerwood Aldeburgh First Collection Prize for poetry:
- Manchester Poetry Prize:
- National Poet of Wales:
- National Poetry Competition:
- Queen's Gold Medal for Poetry:
- Seamus Heaney Poetry Prize:
- T. S. Eliot Prize:

=== United States awards and honors ===
- Arab American Book Award (The George Ellenbogen Poetry Award):
  - Honorable Mentions:
- Agnes Lynch Starrett Poetry Prize:
- Anisfield-Wolf Book Award:
- Beatrice Hawley Award from Alice James Books:
- Bollingen Prize:
- Dwarf Stars Award
  - Jen Stewart Fueston, for "Poem with Lines from My Son" (tie)
  - Mary Soon Lee for "What Trees Read" (tie)
- Elgin Awards
  - Brandon O’Brien for Can You Sign My Tentacle?
  - Amelia Gorman for Field Guide to Invasive Species of Minnesota
- Jackson Poetry Prize:
  - Gay Poetry:
  - Lesbian Poetry:
- Lenore Marshall Poetry Prize:
- Los Angeles Times Book Prize:
- National Book Award for Poetry (NBA):
- National Book Critics Circle Award for Poetry:
- The New Criterion Poetry Prize:
- Pulitzer Prize for Poetry: Diane Seuss, Frank Sonnets
- Wallace Stevens Award:
- Whiting Awards:
- PEN Award for Poetry in Translation:
- PEN Center USA 2021 Poetry Award:
- PEN/Voelcker Award for Poetry: (Judges: )
- Raiziss/de Palchi Translation Award:
- Rhysling Award
  - Beth Cato for "The Bookstore"
  - Mary Soon Lee for “Confessions of a Spaceport AI” (short form)
- Ruth Lilly Poetry Prize:
- Kingsley Tufts Poetry Award: Divya Victor, Curb
- Kate Tufts Discovery Award: torrin a. greathouse, Wound from the Mouth of a Wound
- Walt Whitman Prize – – Judge:
- Yale Younger Series: Mary-Alice Daniel, Mass for Shut-Ins (Judge: Rae Armantrout)

==== From the Poetry Society of America ====
- Frost Medal:
- Shelley Memorial Award:
- Writer Magazine/Emily Dickinson Award:
- Lyric Poetry Award:
- Alice Fay Di Castagnola Award:
- Louise Louis/Emily F. Bourne Student Poetry Award:
- George Bogin Memorial Award:
- Robert H. Winner Memorial Award:
- Cecil Hemley Memorial Award:
- Norma Farber First Book Award:
- Lucille Medwick Memorial Award:
- William Carlos Williams Award:

== Deaths ==
Birth years link to the corresponding "[year] in poetry" article:

- January 3 – Zheng Min (b. 1920), Chinese poet
- January 12 – S. Ramesan (b. 1953), Indian Malayalam-language poet
- February 15 – Taina Tudegesheva (b. 1958), Russian poet and translator
- February 16 – Michel Deguy (b. 1931), French Malayalam-language poet
- March 1 – Jordie Albiston (b. 1961), Australian poet
- March 31 – Richard Howard (b. 1930), American poet and 1970 Pulitzer prize winner
- April 7 – Maya R. Govind (b. 1940), Hindi poet, lyricist and singer
- June 4 – George Lamming (b. 1927), Barbadian poet
- June 12 – Peter Scupham (b. 1933), British English-language poet
- June 14 – Simon Perchik (b. 1924), American poet
- June 15 – Kazue Morisaki (b. 1927), Japanese Japanese-language poet
- June 20 – Alphonse Allain (b. 1925), French French-language poet
- June 21 – Patrizia Cavalli (b. 1947), Italian poet
- June 21 – Ancelin Roseti (b. 1967), Romanian-language poet
- August 18 – Hadrawi (Mohamed Ibrahim Warsame) (b. 1943), Somalian poet
- August 29 – Craig Powell (b. 1940), Australian poet and psychoanalyst
- December 16 – Robert Adamson (b. 1943), Australian poet
- December – Wendy Jenkins (b. 1952), Australian poet, editor and YA novelist

== See also ==
- Poetry
- List of years in poetry
- List of poetry awards
