= Jibanananda Das Award =

Indian literary award

- Type: Literary Translation (Poetry)
- Awarded for: Outstanding works of poetry translated from Indian languages into English.
- Country: India
- Presented by: Kolkata Poetry Confluence; Antonym Magazine; Bhasha Samsad

Jibanananda Das Award is a literary award for outstanding works of poetry in translation from Indian languages into English. The award has been instituted in the memory of the Bengali poet Jibanananda Das. It is conferred by Kolkata Poetry Confluence in collaboration with Antonym Magazine and Bhasha Samsad.

== Award winners ==
The following are Jibanananda Das Award winners for poetry translated from Indian languages into English. Original author names precede translator names :-

- Assamese :- Sameer Tanti by Harshita Hiya
- Bengali :-Mohammad Nurul Huda by Indrani Bhattacharya
- Gujarati :- Kamal Vora by Pratishtha Pandya
- Hindi :- Anamika by Pallavi Singh
- Kashmiri :- Naseem Shafaie by Mohammad Zahid
- Malayalam :- K. Satchidanandan by Ajir Kutty
- Marathi :- Santosh Pawar by Santosh Rathod
- Odia :- Saroj Bal by Snehaprava Das
- Tamil :- Sukirtharani by Deepalakshmi Joseph
- Urdu :- Munawwar Rana by Tapan Kumar Pradhan
