= 1924 in poetry =

Nationality words link to articles with information on the nation's poetry or literature (for instance, Irish or France).

== Events ==
- October 10 – Ezra Pound leaves Paris permanently and moves to Rapallo, Italy. He stays there briefly, moving on to Sicily (he will return to settle in Rapallo in January 1925).
- McGill Daily Literary Supplement started at McGill University in Montreal, Canada (ceases publication in 1925; followed by the McGill Fortnightly Review, 1925–1927) by A. J. M. Smith, F. R. Scott, Leon Edel, and later joined by A. M. Klein and Leo Kennedy. The periodical, which publishes poems and articles on contemporary trends, is the first in Canada to offer consistent commentary on modernist principles in poetry and literature.
- Daniel Corkery publishes the study of 18th century Irish poetry, The Hidden Ireland.

== Works published ==
=== Australia ===
- Arthur Henry Adams, Fifty Nursery Rhymes with Music, Australian
- Edwin James Brady, The Land of the Sun
- C. J. Dennis, Rose of Spadgers
- Kenneth Slessor, Thief of the Moon, Sydney: Hand press of J. T. Kirtley, Australia

=== India in English ===
- Sri Aurobindo, Love and Death, Madras: Shama's Publishing House

=== United Kingdom ===
- Kenneth H. Ashley, Up Hill and Down Dale
- Roy Campbell, The Flaming Terrapin
- T. S. Eliot, Homage to John Dryden (criticism)
- From Overseas, verse from the British colonies; the first published anthology to include Caribbean poetry, with works by nine Jamaican poets included
- Aldous Huxley, Little Mexican, and Other Stories
- John Masefield, Sard Harker
- Susan Miles, The Hares
- A. A. Milne, When We Were Very Young, for children
- Edith Sitwell, The Sleeping Beauty
- A. H. Stockwell, editor, Eastern Dreams: a Selection of Verse, London; anthology; Indian poetry in English, published in the United Kingdom
- Humbert Wolfe, Kensington Gardens
- W. B. Yeats, The Cat and the Moon, and Certain Poems, drama and verse, Irish poet published in the United Kingdom

=== United States ===
- H.D. (Hilda Doolittle), Heliodora and Other Poems
- Hilda Conkling, Silverhorn
- William Faulkner, The Marble Faun
- Robinson Jeffers, Tamar and Other Poems
- William Ellery Leonard, Tutankhamen and After
- Archibald MacLeish, The Happy Marriage and Other Poems
- Edgar Lee Masters, The New Spoon River
- Marianne Moore, Observations
- James Oppenheim, The Sea
- John Crowe Ransom, Chills and Fever
- Mark Van Doren, Spring Thunder

=== Other in English ===
- A. H. Stockwell, editor, Eastern Dreams: a Selection of Verse, London; anthology; Indian poetry in English, published in the United Kingdom
- W. B. Yeats, The Cat and the Moon, and Certain Poems, drama and verse, Irish poet published in the United Kingdom

== Works published in other languages ==
=== France ===
- Anthologie des écrivains morts à la guerre
- Robert Desnos, Deuil pour deuil
- Francis Jammes, Livres des quatrains, published each year from 1922 to 1925
- Jean-Joseph Rabearivelo, La coupe de cendres ("The Cup of Ashes"), Malagasy poet writing in French
- Pierre Reverdy, Les Épaves du ciel
- Saint-John Perse, pen name of Marie-René Alexis Saint-Léger:
  - Amitié du prince, Paris: Ronald Davis
  - Anabase, Paris: Gallimard (revised edition 1948)

=== Other languages ===
- Delmira Agustini, Obras completas ("Complete Works"): Volume 1, El rosario de Eros; Volume 2: Los astros del abismo, posthumously published (died 1914), Montevideo, Uruguay: Máximo García
- Hugo Ball, 7 schizophrene Sonette, German poet in Switzerland
- Villem Grünthal-Ridala, Toomas ja Mai, Estonia
- Sir Muhammad Iqbal, Bang-i-Dara (The Call Of The Marching Bell), the first philosophical poetry book the author writes and publishes in Urdu rather than Persian (translated into English by M.A.K. Khalil in 1996)
- Vladimir Mayakovsky, Vladimir Ilyich Lenin, Soviet Russia
- Gabriela Mistral, Ternura: canciones de niños, Madrid: Saturnino Calleja
- Pablo Neruda, Veinte poemas de amor y una canción desesperada (Twenty Love Poems and a Song of Despair), Chile
- Sergei Yesenin, Land of Scoundrels, Soviet Russia

== Awards and honors ==
- Pulitzer Prize for Poetry: Robert Frost, New Hampshire: A Poem with Notes and Grace Notes

== Births ==
Death years link to the corresponding "[year] in poetry" article:

- February 8 – Lisel Mueller (died 2020), American poet
- March 2 – Edgar Bowers (died 2000) American poet
- March 5 – David Ferry (died 2023), American poet and translator
- March 22 – Michael Hamburger (died 2007), British translator, poet, critic, memoirist and academic
- April 2 – Lauris Edmond (died 2000), New Zealand poet
- April 21 – P. Bhaskaran (died 2007), Indian, Malayalam-language poet and film songwriter
- May 3 – Yehuda Amichai יהודה עמיחי (died 2000), Israeli poet and one of the first to write in colloquial Hebrew
- May 7 – Marjorie Boulton (died 2017), English poet and literary critic writing also in Esperanto
- May 12 – Claribel Alegría (died 2018), Nicaraguan novelist, poet and writer in Nicaragua and El Salvador
- June 7 – Edward Field (died 2026), American poet and author
- June 29
  - Cid Corman (died 2004), American poet, translator and editor
  - John Haines (died 2011), American poet
- July 19 – Vassar Miller (died 1998), American poet
- August 22 – Ada Jafri (died 2015), Urdu poet
- August 28 – Janet Frame (died 2004) New Zealand poet, writer and novelist
- September 28 – James Berry (died 2017), Jamaican-born poet
- October 9 – Jane Cooper (died 2007), American poet
- October 20 – Robert Peters (died 2014), American poet, critic, scholar, playwright and editor
- October 29 – Zbigniew Herbert (died 1998), Polish poet, essayist, moralist and member of the Polish resistance during World War II; perhaps the most famous and most translated of Polish writers
- November 25 – Takaaki Yoshimoto 吉本隆明, also known as "Ryūmei Yoshimoto" (died 2012), Japanese poet, literary critic and philosopher; father of the writer Banana Yoshimoto and cartoonist Haruno Yoiko (surname: Yoshimoto)
- November 28 – Dennis Brutus (died 2009), South African poet and anti-Apartheid activist, imprisoned in the cell next to Nelson Mandela's on Robben Island from 1963 to 1965; earns the Lifetime Honorary Award by the South African Department of Arts and Culture for lifelong dedication to African and world poetry and literary arts
- December 20 – Friederike Mayröcker (died 2021), Austrian poet
- December 21 – Alphonse Allain (died 2022), French Norman language poet
- December 24 – Nissim Ezekiel (died 2004), Indian poet, playwright and art critic writing in English.
- Also:
  - Elizabeth Bartlett (died 2008), English poet
  - Matthew Mead (died 2009), English poet and editor

== Deaths ==
Death years link to the corresponding "[year] in poetry" article:

- January 16 – Kumaran Asan, 50 (born 1873), Indian, Malayalam-language poet
- May 4 – Edith Nesbit, 65 (born 1858), English author and poet whose children's works were published under the name "E. Nesbit"
- July 19 – Kingsley Fairbridge, 39 (born 1885), South African editor of a poetry anthology and humanitarian
- August 25 – Velma Caldwell Melville, 66 (born 1858), American editor and writer
- December 8 – Bochō Yamamura 山村 暮鳥, 40 (born 1884), Japanese vagabond Christian preacher who gained attention as a writer of tales and songs for children and as a poet (surname: Bochō)
- December 15 – William Herbert Carruth, 65 (born 1859), American poet
- December 23 – Thomas William Hodgson Crosland, 59? (born 1865?), English poet

== See also ==
- Poetry
- List of poetry awards
- List of years in poetry
- New Objectivity in German literature and art
