= TISS =

TISS or Tiss may refer to:

- Tanzania Intelligence and Security Service
- Tata Institute of Social Sciences
  - TISS Mumbai
  - Tata Institute of Social Sciences, Hyderabad
- OTs-12 Tiss, a Russian assault rifle
- Jawhara Tiss (born 1985), a Tunisian politician
