= Salma (writer) =

Indian writer

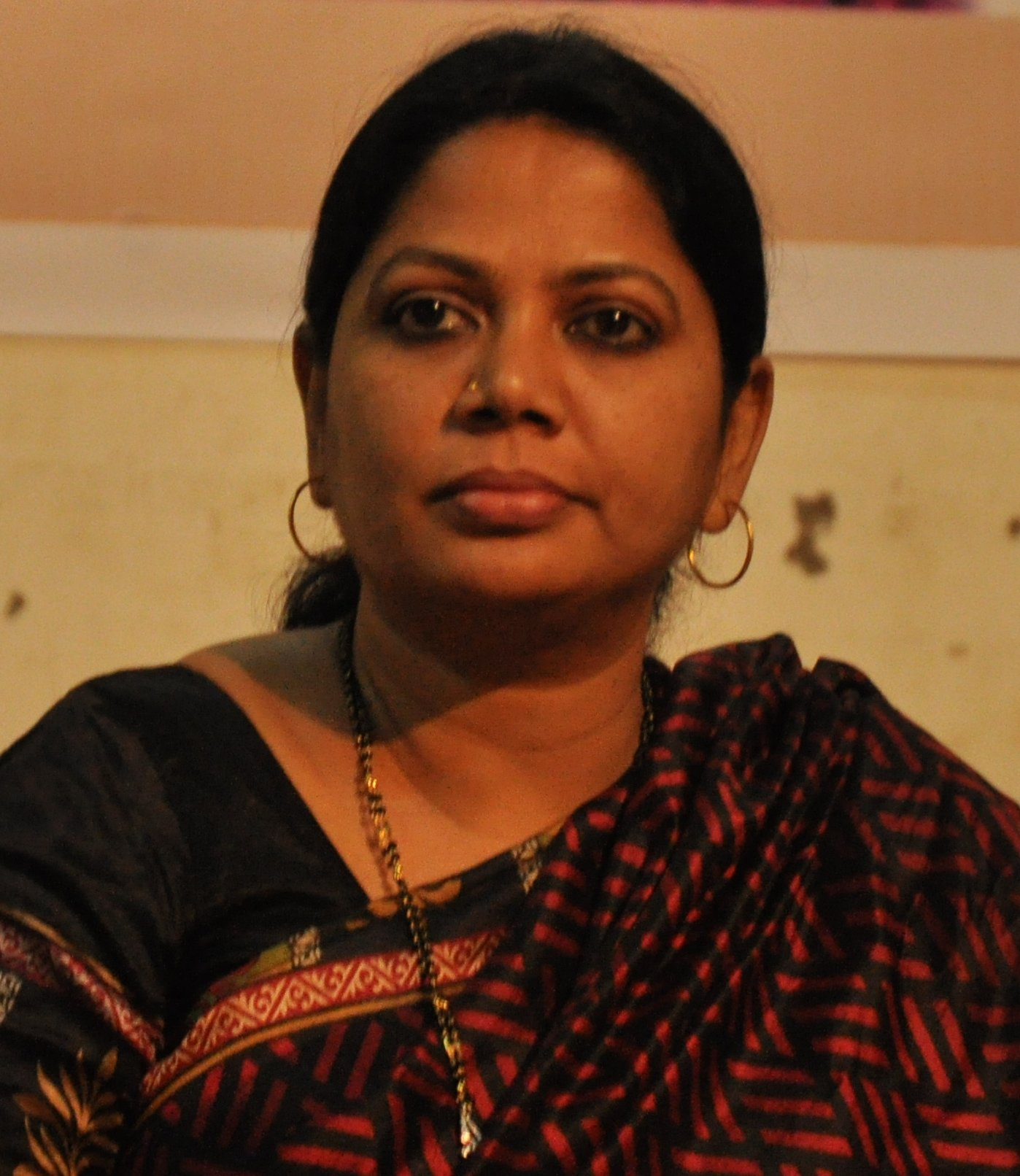

Member of Parliament, Rajya Sabha from List of Rajya Sabha members from Tamil Nadu
- Incumbent
- Assumed office 25 July 2025
- Preceded by: M. M. Abdulla, DMK

Chairperson of Tamil Nadu Social Welfare Board
- In office 2006–2011

President of Ponnampatti Town Council
- In office 2001–2006

Personal details
- Born: Rajathi Samsudeen; 1968 (age 57–58) Thuvarankurichi, Tiruchirappalli district, Madras State (now Tamil Nadu), India
- Citizenship: India
- Party: Dravida Munnetra Kazhagam
- Spouse: Malik (before 1988)
- Children: 2
- Occupation: Writer and Political activist
- Awards: Mahakavi Kanhaiyalal Sethia Award (2019)

Rakkiaiah (alternatively Rokkiah, born Rajathi Samsudeen in 1968) is an Indian Tamil writer, activist, and politician known by the pen name Salma and the nickname Rajathi, and often referred to as Rajathi Salma. Her works have received international acclaim and she is renowned as a sensation in contemporary Tamil literature.

She is a Rajya Sabha member of the Dravida Munnetra Kazhagam and involved in women's and transgender rights activism. Between 2007 and 2011, she served as the chairperson of the State Social Welfare Board of Tamil Nadu. Salma is also the founder of a non-government women's rights organisation named "Your Hope is Remaining".

== Biography ==
=== 1968–1994: Early life ===
Salma was born in the Thuvarankurichi near Tiruchirappalli, Tamil Nadu to a conservative Rowther Muslim family. At a very early age, she became interested in reading. She was unable to pursue her interest in literature due to oppressive rules in her house which restricted her movement. On one occasion she was able to sneak out with a cousin and a male friend to watch a Malayalam language film, Avalude Ravukal, in the theater; the film depicted the life of a teenage prostitute although Salma was oblivious of the topic at the time. Upon finding out about the adventure, her parents were infuriated. They pulled her out of school before she turned 15 and secluded her at home. Her cousin and her friend did not face heavy consequences and eventually her friend began sneaking books to her from the village library. As a result, during her teen years Salma became an avid reader and writer. She was enamored with Russian literature, having read the translated works of Fyodor Dostoevsky and Leo Tolstoy, and her icons became figures like Nelson Mandela and Che Guevara instead of film stars.

At the age of 13, Salma was betrothed to a cousin named Malik but was able to postpone the marriage until she was 19, when her mother persuaded her to marry by feigning a heart attack. Following marriage, Salma was granted the name of Rokkiah Begum and had two children. Her interest in literature continued in her married life and was seen as akin to insanity by her family. At the age of 22, Salma wrote her first poem, Oppandham, as an outlet for her frustration and anger with her situation. Forced to hide her passion from her family, she would write while sitting on the toilet, on pieces of paper ripped from calendars and notebooks. She was subjected to abuse by her husband because of her desire to write and he would often destroy her work if he found it. Her mother eventually helped her by smuggling out poems from her home and getting them published in a Tamil weekly.

=== 1994–2006: Literary career and political debut ===
Around 1994–98, Salma had become a well-known figure in Tamil literary circles. She was signed with the Kalachuvadu publishing house and was invited to a number of literary conventions around Tamil Nadu which she visited under the guise of medical visits. Since a woman travelling alone was frowned upon in her social setting, her mother accompanied her on her first event in the city of Chennai.

Her family, however, continued to be apprehensive of her activities and regarded them as subversive. Her poems were described as unconventional as they covered social issues and did not refrain from mentioning women's sexuality, which eventually invoked the wrath of the social orthodoxy in her conservative neighbourhood as well as of her family, especially as she wrote poetry under her birth name and nickname of Rajathi. Their reaction caused her to adopt the pen name of Salma, appropriated from a character in a Kahlil Gibran novel. She published her first anthology of poems, Oru Malaiyum, Innoru Malaiyum under this name in 2000. In the same year, she was invited to a major three-day literary event called the World Tamil Conference set in Chennai. She attended, but refused to go on stage fearing that if a picture were to be published in the press it would raise controversy in her village and family. She also began writing a novel, which she completed by 2001 but was hesitant about publishing.

In 2001, Salma contested the panchayat (local body) elections in Ponnampatti and was subsequently elected as the panchayat leader. In her testimony she states that her family was not opposed to her contesting as it was a constituency reserved for women and they intended to control it through her; but instead she carved out an opportunity for herself. She was able to eventually leverage her position and become independent as she began serving as an elected official, chairing meetings and educating women in her community. In 2002, she was invited to an international women's rights conference held in Sri Lanka. She published her second anthology of poems, Devathai, in 2003, and acceded to publishing her novel, Irandaam Jaamangalin Kadhai in 2004. The novel was described as a semi-autobiographical work, and depicted the life and hardships faced by a young girl called Rabia born in an orthodox Muslim minority community who staunchly clung to their traditions and ritual observance.

Salma states that she was impressed by the chief minister Karunanidhi, whom she calls the "poet of progress" for having instituted the 50% reservation quota for women in local body elections and for paying attention to women's issues, which ultimately led her to join the Dravida Munnetra Kazhagam in 2004. After joining the party, she was appointed as the deputy secretary of the party's women's wing. In the 2006 Tamil Nadu Legislative Assembly election, the party nominated her to contest as the candidate from the Marungapuri constituency. She lost the election by 1,200 votes, polling at 55,378 votes cast in her favor against 57,910 votes cast in favor of the winning candidate. During the campaigning, her opponent had circulated sexually explicit material from her writings in an attempt to swing some voters in his favor. Some of her male party workers had also reportedly hindered the campaigning efforts, to which she had later exclaimed that "some things never change for women".

=== 2006–Present: Later career ===
Despite the loss, she was appointed as the chairperson of the State Social Welfare Trust, as the Dravida Munnetra Kazhagam was able to attain a majority in the Tamil Nadu Legislative Assembly and form a government. During her tenure as chairperson, Salma was noted for her advocacy for the establishment of a number of welfare schemes and for launching several initiatives which were considered landmark schemes for transgender rights. She was also instrumental in launching an awareness campaign for the Domestic Violence Act and holding training programmes among police personnel, counselors, judges and women. In 2010, Salma founded the Chennai-based non-government organisation "Your Hope is Remaining", and began working as a social worker among rural women in an effort to promote gender equality. In 2011, she lost her position as the chairperson of the State Social Welfare Trust when the Dravida Munnetra Kazhagam was voted out of power.

In the meantime, her anthology of short stories Saabam was published in 2009, which was translated by N Kalyan Raman into English as The Curse: Stories. In 2016, she published her second novel Manaamiyangal, which narrated the parallel lives of two women named Mehar and Parveen. In a review by the Hindustan Times, the novel was described as having captured Hélène Cixous's "feminine practice of writing". It was translated from Tamil to English by Meena Kandasamy under the title of Women, Dreaming.

== Social and political beliefs ==
=== On women's issues and feminism ===
Salma holds the position that writing itself is a political act as one draws from society which in turn becomes a means of conveying political thought. Her writings themselves have been described on multiple occasions as one capturing a feminine perspective in them. According to her, the popular notion of a "well-defined morality" for a woman leads to the suppression of her body and mind, and that from her perspective, morality is about love, about whether one prioritises making people happy and not hurting them. She states that women are expected to get married and become homemakers, whereas looking after the family should be the joint responsibility of both partners, and adds that women need the freedom to choose and act without fear, and that they do not need a man's permission to do so. Regarding face covering for women, she has taken the position that dressing is a personal choice of women and that no one has the right to dictate what one can or can not wear.

On asked whether she considers herself a feminist, Salma states that she does not identify herself as a feminist but is not opposed to being called one. According to her, while women have many more opportunities compared to the past, they still are not seen at equals of men by society at large. She has also come out in support of the MeToo movement in India, stating that it was long overdue and has given women the courage to speak up against workplace harassment. Since 2015, Salma has come out in explicit support for the LGBT movement in India as well.

=== On religious conservatism ===
Salma has been severely critical of Muslim religious orthodoxy in both her writing and advocacy. In particular, she has condemned the All India Muslim Personal Law Board for enabling misogynistic attitudes and the tradition of triple talaq to persist among the Muslim community in India. According to her, religious fundamentalist leaders have attempted to appropriate culture as a whole and in the process resorted to intimidation of writers such as Taslima Nasrin, M. F. Husain and Salman Rushdie.

She also holds that democracy in India is faltering as dissidents are being characterised as Urban Naxals and targeted with violence and state repression. Salma has attributed the rise of the Bharatiya Janata Party as the reason for increase in caste based violence in Tamil Nadu, accused the party of attempting to ferment hatred against every Muslims and of attempting to control culture by resorting to the same tactics by targeting artists like Perumal Murugan, Puliyoor Murugesan, Gunasekaran Sundarraj and Khushbu.

== Reception, recognition, and awards ==
Salma's life has been extensively documented by Kim Longinotto in her documentary Salma, which is described as a journey of an under-educated housewife who was subjected to an effective form of house arrest and became an acclaimed Tamil literary figure. Longinotto herself described Salma as an "extraordinary beacon of hope". The documentary, which was screened in 2013, received several awards and was seen in eleven countries.

The Indian magazine The Week accorded Salma the title of "Symbol of Perseverance" in one of its feature articles. Her works have been translated by the acclaimed Lakshmi Holmström and featured along with the likes of Sukirtharani, Malathi Maitri, and Kutti Revathi. Salma received the fourth edition of the Mahakavi Kanhaiyalal Sethia Award at the Jaipur Literature Festival in 2019.

== Bibliography ==
=== Anthology of poems ===
- Oru Maalaiyum Innoru Maalaiyum, (An Evening and Another Evening, 2000)
- Pachchai Devathai, (Green Angel, 2003)

=== Novels ===
- Irandaam Jaamangalin Kathai, (The Hours Past Midnight, 2004)
- Manaamiyangal (Dreams, 2016)

=== Collections ===
- Sabaam (Curses, 2009 & 2012)
