= Tudegesheva =

Tudegesheva is a surname. Notable people with the surname include:

- Taina Tudegesheva (1957–2022), Russian poet
- Yekaterina Tudegesheva (born 1987), Russian snowboarder
