= ACJ =

ACJ may refer to:

== Businesses and organizations ==
- ACJ O Shopping Corporation, owner of Philippines channel O Shopping
- Airbus Corporate Jets
- American Council for Judaism
- Asian College of Journalism, Bangalore, India
- Asian College of Journalism, Chennai, India
- Jazz Aviation, formerly known as Air Canada Jazz

== Other uses ==
- Acromioclavicular joint
- Acting Chief Justice (abbreviation "ACJ")
- Anuradhapura Airport in North Central Province, Sri Lanka (IATA airport code ACJ)
