= Paramita Satpathy =

Odia writer

- ପାରମିତା ଶତପଥୀ
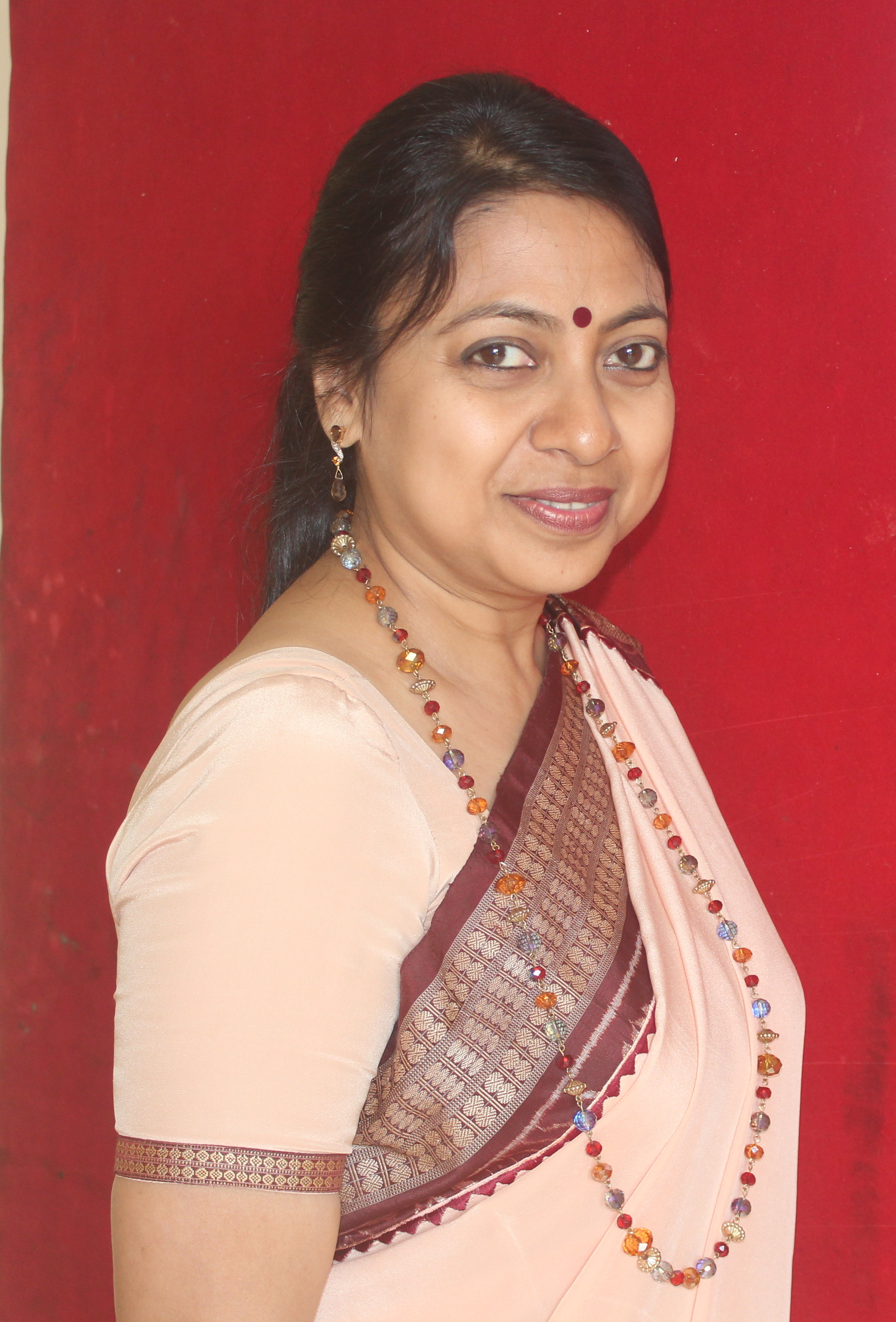
- Paramita Satpathy
- Born: 30 August 1965 (age 61)
- Occupations: Commissioner, Income-taxIncome-tax, Writer
- Relatives: Nityanand Satpathy; Pratibha Satpathy
- Writing career
- Language: Odia
- Notable awards: Sahitya Akademi Award, 2016
- Website: paramitasatpathy.com

Paramita Satpathy (born 30 August 1965) is an Indian writer. Paramita is the daughter of Sahitya Akademi Award winner poet Pratibha Satpathy and Nityananda Satpathy.

Her first short-story was published in 1985 in 'Jhankar' magazine. Paramita, who has authored seven short-story collections, has been selected for the Sahitya Akademi Award 2016 for Odia. She has won the award for ‘Prapti’, a short-story collection she wrote in 2012. Prapti was released in a compact disc (CD) in August 2015. Many of her novels have also been translated into Hindi, English, Bengali, Telugu and Marathi languages.

Paramita who had joined Indian Revenue Service in 1989, is posted as the commissioner of the Income Tax department.

== Writings ==
Paramita, has seven short-story collections and a novel to her credit like-

- Chandan ke Phool, 2015
- Narikabi O Anyamane, 2015
- Prapti, 2012
- Intimate Pretence, 2010
- Kurei Fula, 2009
- Dur ke Pahad, 2007
- Antaranga Chhala, 2006
- Apathacharini, 2005
- Birala Rupaka, 2003
- Bhashakshara, 2000
- Bibidha Aswapna, 1997

== Awards ==
- Kalinga Karubaki Award 2017, Kalinga Literary Festival
- Sahitya Akademi Award, 2016
- Kadambini Galpa Samman, 2010
- Seashore srujan Samman, 2010
- Amrutayan Galpa Puraskar
- Odisha Sahitya Akademi Award, 2006
- Bharatiya Bhasa Parishad Yuva Puraskar, 2003
- Gangadhar Rath Foundation Award, 2002
- Bhubaneswar Book Fair Award, 2001
