= Malathi Maithri =

Indian writer, activist and feminist

Malathi Maithri (born 1968) is an Indian writer, activist and feminist, who is recognised as a distinguished poet in contemporary Tamil literature. Maithri has been the recipient of the Tirupur Tamizh Sangam Award and the State Award for Poetry by the Government of Puducherry. She is also the founder of first feminist magazine anangu and first feminist publishing house called Anangu (transl. Woman) which has translated works of Nigerian writer Chimamanda Ngozi Adichie such as Purple Red Poppy and We Should All Be Feminists.

== Biography ==
Maithri was born in the Indian union territory of Puducherry in 1968, to a family of fishers. According to The Hindu, being from a Tamil fisher family granted her some degree of independence as a woman and has been influential in her style of poetry. Her first publication, a short story titled Prayanam, was featured in the premier Tamil literature magazine Kaniayazhi in 1988. She rose to prominence in the early 2000s along withf other Tamil women writers such as Salma and Sukirtharani. Her poems have been described as alluding to gender issues as a recurrent theme, and as transgressive in style. Maitri states that Periyar E. V. Ramasamy has been one of her biggest influences in her work, that in his time, he had called for "uterine politics" as the need of the hour which did not take off, because of which she has decided to employ aggressive rhetoric in her publications and activism, described as "vaginal politics" by her. She has also been critical of the current state of feminism, which, according to her, has become controlled and marketed by corporate interests and as a result compromising in search of acceptability.
