= Antony Theodore =

German bilingual poet, writer and scholar of religions

Antony Theodore (born 1954) is a bilingual German poet, pastor and educator who writes in both English and German. He writes mostly on spiritual teachings of Jesus Christ and underlying unity of all world religions. His spiritual poems are read as sermons at United Church of Christ. He has also written spiritual biography of the American mystic Thomas Merton. More than 5000 of his poems have been posted on various poetry websites like Poem Hunter, where he is consistently ranked among top world poets.

== Life and works ==
Antony Theodore was born on November 9, 1954, as John Antony Theodore Vazhakuttathil in Alleppey district of Kerala, India. After early demise of his foster mother Genova Maa, Antony migrated to Germany. He studied at Fordham University in New York City and LMU Munich in Munich. He obtained two bachelor's degrees and also two doctorate degrees in English literature and philosophy of world religions. In 1986 when Antony was travelling from Mumbai to Frankfurt the Pan Am 73 flight carrying him got hijacked at Karachi airport. In the 16 hour siege 22 of the 400 passengers were killed. Antony miraculously escaped with four gunshot wounds. After this traumatic experience Antony devoted his life to education and social service. He was ordained a pastor and worked as a chaplain in St Martin, Munich. He has lived and worked most of his life in Dortmund in Germany although he has retained his association with Diocese of Alleppey. He often conducts charitable fundraising activities for health and social work.

== Poetry and spiritual literature ==
More than 5000 of Antony's poems have been published on poetry websites like Poet Freak, Poem Hunter, Starlite Cafe, Micropoet and Poet's Garden etc. Besides the teachings of Christ, he has also written extensively on the universal truths expressed in the holy books of other world religions like Hinduism, Buddhism, Islam, Judaism, Confucianism and Zoroastrianism etc. His poem anti-abortion poem "I am Your Baby, Mother" has been translated into more than twenty languages including French, Italian, Russian, Greek, Arabic and Hindi. His poetic works on comparative world religions titled Psalms of Love and Jesus Christ in Love have been edited and commented by the Indian poet Dr Tapan Kumar Pradhan.

== Bibliography ==
=== Books in English ===
- Theodore, Antony; Pradhan, Tapan Kumar (2021). Psalms of Love. New Delhi: Kohinoor Books. ISBN 978-81-952546-1-3.
- Theodore, Antony (2020). I Am Your Baby, Mother. New Delhi: Kohinoor Books. ISBN 978-81-945797-2-4.
- Theodore, Antony; Nayak, Bharati (2020). In the Realms of Love and Divinity. New Delhi: Authorspress. ISBN 978-81-952546-1-3.
- Theodore, Antony (2019). Jesus Christ in Love. New Delhi: Kohinoor Books. ISBN 978-81-942835-3-9.
- Theodore, J. Antony (2015). In the Shadow of Your Wings. Mumbai: Pauline Publications. ISBN 978-81-717679-9-1.
- Theodore, John Antony (2009). Song of My Dance and Dance of My Dreams. Milton Keynes: Author Press. ISBN 978-14-389511-8-8.
- Theodore, John Antony (2008). Divine Moments. Milton Keynes: Author Press. ISBN 978-14-343562-3-9.
- Theodore, John Antony (1993). Thomas Merton's Mystical Quest for Union with God. Verne: Eos Verlag. ISBN 978-38-809676-3-2.

=== Books in German ===
- Theodore, Antony (2016). Du bist die Seele meines Seins. Verne: Ventura Verlaghaus. ISBN 978-39-408533-9-4.
- Theodore, Antony (2014). Gottliche Augenblicke - Eine Reise durch das Jahr. Verne: Ventura Verlaghaus. ISBN 978-39-408532-5-7.
- Theodore, Antony (2013). Im Schatten deiner Schwingen. Verne: Ventura Verlaghaus. ISBN 978-39-408532-0-2.

=== Chapters in books ===
- Theodore, Antony (2018), "Relevance of Thomas Merton's Spirituality", in Jose, Fabian (ed.), Contemplative Prophetic Spirituality of Thomas Merton, vol. 1 (1st ed.), Berkeley: Santa Clara University.
- Theodore, Antony (2016), "Humans Are Unique", in Mangattu, Manu (ed.), Pain, Pleasure and Paradox in Poetry – A Verse Compendium, vol. 1 (1st ed.), Los Gatos: Smashwords.
- Theodore, Vazhakuttathil (2002), "Thomas Merton's Spiritual Quest", in Ackermans, Gian; Nissen, Peter (eds.), De verleiding van het vreemde, vol. 1 (1st ed.), Hilversum: Verloren.

=== Journal articles ===
- Theodore, Antony (2016). "Five Poems of Antony Theodore". Creation and Criticism. 2. ISSN 2455-9687.

== See also ==
- Fordham University
- Tapan Kumar Pradhan
