= M. M. Abdulla =

Indian politician

Member of Parliament, Rajya Sabha from Tamil Nadu
- In office 6 September 2021 – 24 July 2025
- Preceded by: A. Mohammedjan
- Succeeded by: Salma, DMK

M. M. Abdulla is an Indian politician from Dravida Munnetra Kazhagam who served as Members of Rajya Sabha.

== Early life and education ==
M.M. Abdulla was born on 30 July 1975 in Pudukkottai, Tamil Nadu. His father was K. Mohamed Ismail and his mother was M. Nabeesa. He completed his undergraduate studies with a Bachelor of Business Administration (B.B.A.) degree from M.I.E.T. College of Arts and Science, Tiruchirappalli. He later pursued higher education in management and earned a Master’s degree in Business Management from St. Joseph’s College, Chennai.

== Personal life ==
He married A. Jannathul Firthose on 14 July 2002 and has two daughters.
