= Asian College of Journalism, Chennai =

Journalism school in Chennai, Tamil Nadu, India

Coordinates: 12.995967°N 80.246249°E

Asian College of Journalism
- Other name: ACJ
- Dean: Nalini Rajan
- Location: Taramani 600113, Chennai, Tamil Nadu, India
- Website: www.asianmedia.org

The Asian College of Journalism (ACJ) is a journalism school in Chennai, India, which offers postgraduate diploma courses in journalism.

== History ==
Asian College of Journalism, Chennai was founded in Bangalore as the Asian School of Journalism, Bangalore. It was founded in 1994 by the Indian Express group, offering only a print course. In 2000, it was taken over by a not-for-profit trust founded by journalist, Sashi Kumar. It was renamed and shifted to Chennai, in the same location as the old Hindu office on Wallajah Road. Since then, the institution has relocated to an 80,000 sq. ft location in Taramani that includes the college and residential blocks, both four storeys high. It now comes under the aegis of the Media Development Foundation, a subsidiary of The Hindu Group, headed by chairman Sashi Kumar. For the first two years in Chennai it was headed by K. Thomas Oommen.

== Infrastructure ==
=== Auditorium ===
One of the iconic addition to the institution's infrastructure is the M. S. Subbulakshmi Auditorium. Unique among the city's concert venues, the 342-seater auditorium is an acoustically designed mic-free venue. The design allows no echo and delayed reflection of sound. The reflectors in the ceiling and a bandshell help performers listen to themselves, even when the sound is pushed to the back of the space. In addition, concrete panels on the side and the back walls diffuse the sound in every direction, making the microphone-less natural sound heard throughout the auditorium without any artificial amplification.

== Academics ==
ACJ offers a postgraduate diploma with specialisation in four streams under its 10-month programme – Television, Print, New Media and Radio.

In the first trimester, all students, irrespective of their chosen medium, are taught the basics of Broadcast, Web and Print. From the second trimester onwards, students learn reporting in their choice of medium. The highlight of the stream specialisations are the in-house publications that students work on throughout the term. Print students publish their newspaper ‘The Word’ twice a week. Similarly New Media students report for their news e-zine, ACJ Newsline on a daily basis. Television and radio students produce news shows every day.

Over the second and third terms, students take three electives out of the 16 offered by the college. Some of the electives are Photo Journalism, Cinema, Sports, Politics, Arts and Culture, Identities, International Issues, Business, Gender studies, Ecology, Citizenship, Health, Science, Urban studies and Economics.

The Cardiff University, Wales, United Kingdom has audited and recognised the ACJ postgraduate diploma programme as on par with its own. An exclusive arrangement between the two is in place whereby students of the ACJ who clear a set benchmark can transfer their diploma credits to Cardiff University and, on successful completion of an additional dissertation, be awarded the University’s M.A Degree in Journalism.

== Admission ==
Admission to the program is through a three-stage process :

- Application – applications are screened and successful candidates are invited to take a test
- Test – of English, General Knowledge and an Essay
- Interview – successful candidates are invited for an interview in Chennai

== Scholarship ==
The SAF-Madanjeet Singh scholarship for the one year postgraduate course at the Asian College of Journalism covers eight countries, viz: Afghanistan, Bangladesh, Bhutan, India, Maldives, Nepal, Pakistan and Sri Lanka. Candidates are required to have cleared an undergraduate course in any discipline. Equivalent course in different SAARC countries are also considered on a case by case basis. The scholarship covers: (a) tuition fees, (b) economy air travel from the scholar's place of residence within SAARC to Chennai and back, (c) accommodation costs, on a room sharing basis, for the duration of the course in Chennai, (d) food expenses covering breakfast, lunch and dinner at the ACJ canteen, (e) a nominal amount towards pocket expenses.

== Controversies ==
In 2018, Sadanand Menon, a well-known art critic and faculty member at the Asian College of Journalism was embroiled in a sexual allegation charge raised by a former student of his at the ACJ. Eventually, several of his students and associates opened up about the repeatedly predatory ways in which he had behaved with women. Students of the 2018 batch at the ACJ decried the college's deep-seated apathy towards sexual harassment cases, with the chairman of the college claiming that they were targeted because they were liberal. Menon eventually stepped down from teaching at the ACJ for that academic year.

== Notable alumni ==
- Shaili Chopra
- Pallavi Singh
- Shiv Aroor
- Dhanya Rajendran
- Rohan Joshi
- Leslie Tripathy
- Manju Latha Kalanidhi
