= Jawhara Tiss =

Tunisian politician

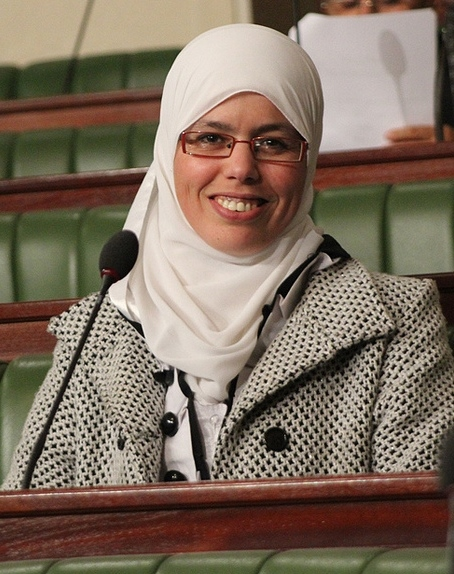
A portrait of Jawhara Tiss

Jawhara Tiss (born 8 July 1985) is a Tunisian politician who was a member of the Constituent Assembly from 2011 until 2020.

== Early life and education ==
Tiss was born in Ghomrassen in Tataouine on 8 July 1985. She obtained a degree in literary studies from the University of Tunis in 2007 and a master's degree in English from the Ecole Normale Supérieure in 2010.

== Career ==
Tiss worked as a teacher at the Higher Institute of Languages in Tunis until 2011. After joining the Ennahda Movement, she was elected on 23 October 2011 as a Member of the Constituent Assembly. She was one of the youngest members of the Assembly, and in debates over the proposed constitution notably commented that it is impossible to fully define "Islam". When the constitution was passed she said it "institutionalized revolution in Tunisia" and when asked if it would improve her baby daughter's life, she said "Of course, and if it doesn't, she can change it."

Tiss announced her departure from parliament in 2020. She publicly resifed from the Ennahdha Movement on 9 November 2020, saying that it had been reduced to a project serving the will of its Islamist leader, Rached Ghannouchi, without scope for substantive work.

== Personal life ==
Tiss married in 2012 and gave birth to a daughter in 2013, whom she sometimes brought into the assembly.
