= Ponnampatti =

- Panchayat town
- Location in Tamil Nadu, India Ponnampatti (India)
- Coordinates: 10°33′00″N 78°22′28″E
- Country: India
- State: Tamil Nadu
- District: Tiruchirappalli

Population (2001)
  - Total: 10,659

Languages
  - Official: Tamil
- Time zone: UTC+5:30 (IST)

Ponnampatti is a panchayat town in Tiruchirappalli district in the Indian state of Tamil Nadu.

== Demographics ==
At the 2001 India census, Ponnampatti had a population of 10,659. Males constituted 49% of the population, while females accounted for 51%. The average literacy rate in Ponnampatti was 65%, which was higher than the national average of 59.5%. The male literacy rate was 75%, and the female literacy rate was 55%. Additionally, 14% of the population in Ponnampatti was under the age of 6.
