= Mohammad Zahid (poet) =

Indian poet

- Born: 1977 (age 48–49); Anantnag, Kashmir Valley, India
- Occupations: Poet; translator; editor
- Parent(s): Bashir Ahmad Makhdoomi; Badshah Gowher
- Writing career
- Notable awards: Jibanananda Das Award

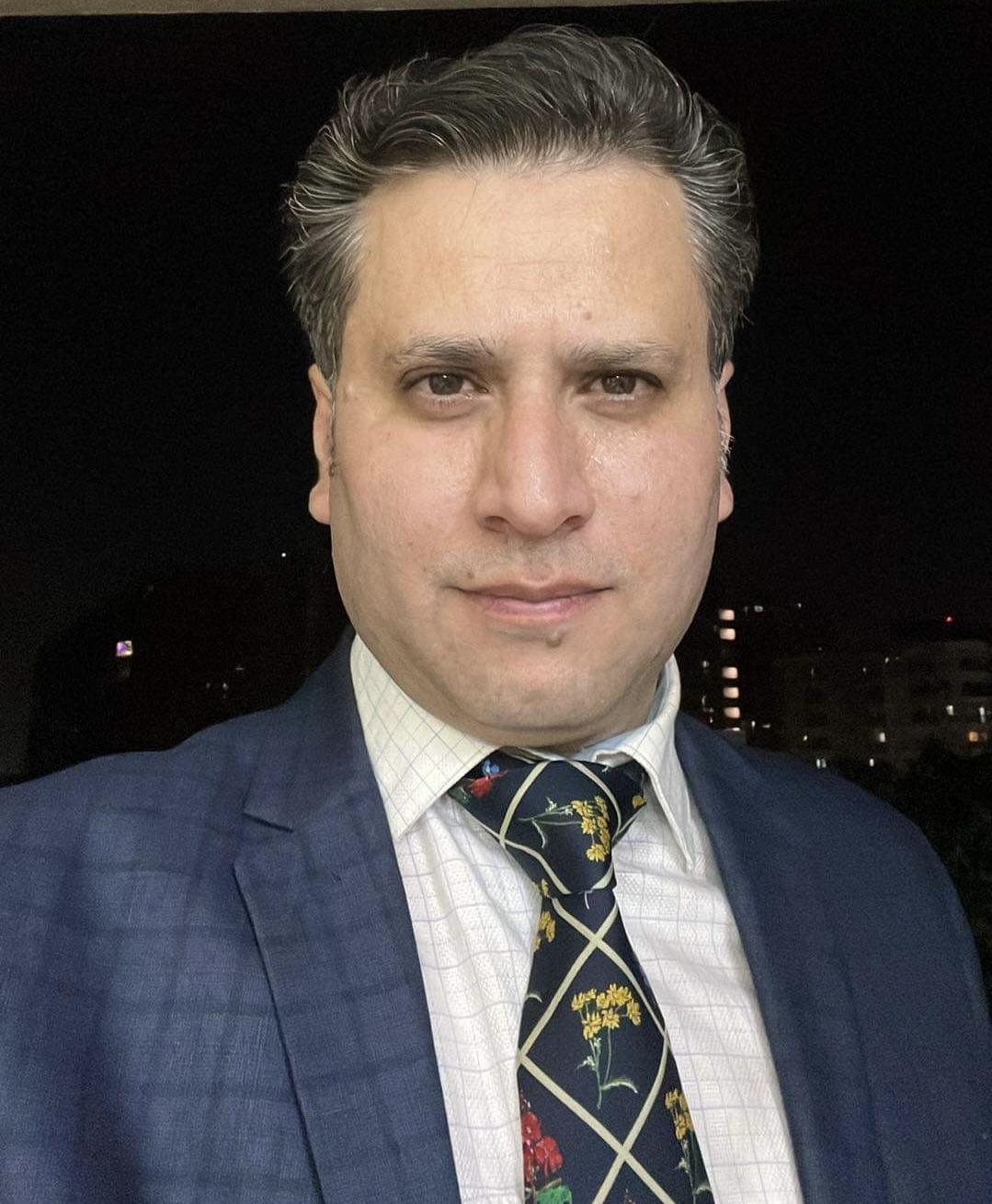

Mohammad Zahid (born 1977) is an Indian poet, translator and editor from Anantnag, Kashmir. He is a recipient of Best Book Award from Academy of Art Culture & Languages, J&K for his maiden poetry collection, The Pheromone Trail. He is also a recipient of Jibanananda Das Award for his translation of Kashmiri poetry into English.

== Early life and education ==
Mohammad Zahid was born in 1977 at Anantnag in Kashmir Valley. His father Bashir Ahmad Makhdoomi and mother Badshah Gowher were scholars of English literature and Persian literature, respectively. Zahid had his early education in Anantnag. Having his Bachelor's degree in Science, he studied English Literature at Aligarh Muslim University. Later he joined Jammu & Kashmir Bank as a Probationary Officer.

== Professional and literary career ==
Despite being a banker by profession, Zahid has devoted his spare time to literature. His poetry has featured at International Library of Poetry, Florida and International Poetry Festival. He has served as Editor of Muse India. He has also served as a feature photographer for various journals like Lake View International Journal for Literature and Arts and translator editor for several other journals. His poetry has been translated into French, Spanish and other world languages. His maiden poetry book “The Pheromone Trail” won the best book award from the Jammu and Kashmir Academy of Art, Culture and Language. His poetry essentially captures the “illusion of fantasies that has enamoured Kashmiri people”. He has also translated Kashmiri poetry into English including Sahitya Akademi award winning works of Naseem Shafaie.

== Awards and recognitions ==
- Best Book Award from Academy of Art Culture & Languages, J&K
- Jibanananda Das Award
- Reliance Time-Out Poetry Award
- Sacred Heart Poetry Prize

== Bibliography ==
- The Pheromone Trail (2013)
- Graffiti Of Dreams (2023)
- Kashmiri Language & Poetry Volume I (English Translation of Kashmiri Zuban aur Shayiri by Abdul Ahad Azad Published by Jammu & Kashmir Academy of Art Culture & Languages
- Abdul Rahim Aama English Translation (Makers of Indian Literature) Sahitya Akademi New Delhi India
- The Hall of Mirrors English Translation of Aaena Khana Sahitya Akademi award winning essay collection of Aziz Hajini, Published by Sahitya Akademi
- Kashmiri Language & Poetry Volume III (English Translation of Kashmiri Zuban aur Shayiri by Abdul Ahad Azad Published by Jammu & Kashmir Academy of Art Culture & Languages

== See also ==
- Naseem Shafaie

https://www.exoticindiaart.com/book/details/abdul-rahim-aama-makers-of-indian-literature-uam220/
