= Snehaprava Das =

Indian writer and translator (born 1955)

Snehaprava Das (born 10 October 1955) is an Indian writer and translator in the Odia language. She is a pioneer translator of several classic works from the Odia language into English. She has also translated several world classics into the Odia language. Her English translations rank among the top translated works from the Odia language.

== Biography ==
Snehaprava obtained her master's degree in English literature and doctorate in translation studies and comparative literature from Utkal University. As an associate professor she has taught English literature at several institutions of higher learning. She also served as principal of Binayak Acharya College, Berhampur.

== Works ==
Snehaprava has translated “Padmamali” by Umesh Chandra Sarkar, the first novel in Odiya, into English, besides several novels by Fakir Mohan Senapati. Her other works include ‘The World Within’, an English translation of Odia novel “Mane Mane “ by Baishnaba Charan Das and “Bibasini, A Historical Romance” by Ramsankar Ray. She also translated world classics from English to Oriya, including poems of Elizabeth Jennings and P.B. Shelley, besides short stories by Saki and Oscar Wilde. She has translated several poetry and story collections and biographies, including the celebrated autobiography "Bandira Atmakatha" by Gopabandhu Das..

She is also a poet herself. Her works in Odia have been published in Prativeshi, Kahani, Anupam Bharat and other magazines, whereas her English translations have been published in Indian Literature, The Orissa Review, The Little Magazine, Rock Pebbles etc.

Her translation of "Colours of Loneliness" by Paramita Satpathy is critically acclaimed. Her most discussed work of translation is "One Thousand Years in a Refrigerator". According to her, translation is a strategy to subvert hierarchies and check all forms of dominations, and also a tool for liberating human consciousness.

== Awards and recognition ==
- 2022 :- Jibanananda Das Award

== Bibliography ==
=== Translation from Odia into English ===
- The Penance (Original Odia Prayaschitta by Fakir Mohan Senapati)
- The World Within (Original Odia Mane Mane by Baishnab Charan Das)
- Colours of Loneliness (original Odia by Paramita Satpathy)
- One Thousand Days in a Refrigerator (from Manoj Kumar Panda)
- A Boundless Moment (original by Paramita Satpathy)
- Gopabandhu Das : The Prisoner's Autobiography

=== Poetry by Snehaprava Das ===
- Songs of Solitude
- Dusk Diary
- Alone
- Moods and Moments
- Never Say No to a Rose
- Colours of Loneliness and Other Stories (from poems of Paramita Satpathy)
