= Kenneth H. Ashley =

English poet and novelist

Kenneth Herbert Ashley (1885–1969) was an English poet and novelist. He was born to Herbert and Mary Ashley in Mansfield Woodhouse in 1885, the third of three sons, and married Bertha Raithby (1888–1981) in 1917 in Mansfield. His publications include a book of poetry entitled Up Hill and Down Dale (1924), and the novels Creighton the Admirable (1926) and Death of a Curate (1932). In addition his poems were published in The London Mercury, The Spectator, The Athenaeum and various anthologies. His poem "Rudkin" was selected by Leonard Strong as one of the best poems of 1923.
