= Saroj Bal =

Indian poet

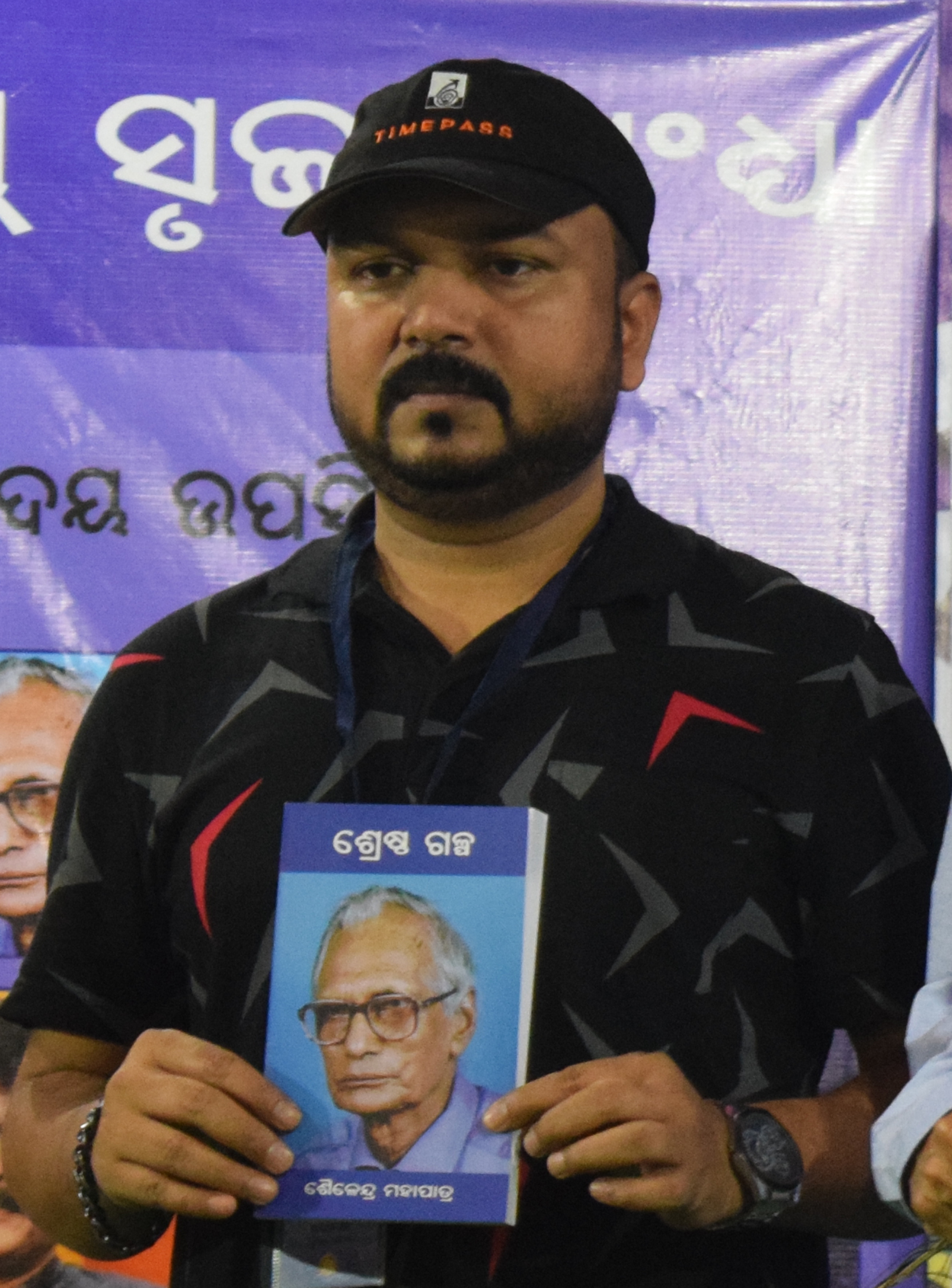
- Saroj Bal at Salandi Book Fair, Bhadrak.
- Born: 2 February 1976 (age 50); Bhadrak, Odisha, India
- Education: MA in Odia Literature
- Alma mater: Utkal University
- Occupations: poet, editor, publisher
- Writing career
- Language: Odia
- Period: 21st century
- Genres: Poetry
- Notable work: Samay Saha Selfie

Saroj Bal (born 2 February 1976) is a Odia language poet from India. He is also a translator and editor of several literary journals.

== Biography ==
Saroj Bal was born on 2 February 1976 at village Arjunbindha in Bhadrak district of Odisha, India. He completed his post graduate education in Odia literature from Utkal University. He has pursued creative writing as his career, besides working as a digital designer, musician, journalist and literary activist. He is also a publisher with his own publication house "Time Pass". He has designed several books as a graphic illustrator.

== Works ==
Saroj Bal has written fourteen poetry books, four collections of short stories and one novel. he has edited several literary journals including "Saamanaa", "Sindoor" and "Rebati". His poems have been widely translated into English language. He regularly performs his poetry at national literary festivals. In 2022 Saroj Bal's Odia poems translated by Snehaprava Das won Jibanananda Das Award for poetry. His poems on inclusivity and togetherness graced the Kolkata Poetry Confluence.

== Awards ==
- Katha Naba Pratibha Award
- Basanta Muduli Kabita Award
- State Youth Award
- Kadambini Feature Award
- Rabi Patnaik Memorial Award

== Bibliography ==
=== Novels ===
- 2012 - Bahare Barasa

=== Poetry ===
- 2022 - Raatira Bati
- 2022 - Prema Pahandi
- 2018 - Samay Saha Selfie
- 2018 - Udaya Raag
- 2014 - Saata Dinare Goraapana
- 2012 - Tu Marichikaa ku Mun Marubhoomi
- 2010 - Power Cut

=== Translation into other languages ===
- Sunshine in Janpath (Translated by Harmendra Singh)
- जन पथ में धूप (Translated by Shankar Lal Purohit)

=== Magazines edited by Saroj Bal ===
- Saamanaa
- Sindoor
- Rebati
- Maata
- Pustak Melaa haalchaal
