= Pratibha Satpathy =

Indian poet (born 1945)

- Born: 27 November 1945 (age 80); Odisha, India
- Occupations: Poet, essayist, editor, translator
- Writing career
- Language: Odia
- Period: 1962–present
- Genres: Poetry, literary criticism, translation
- Notable works: Tanmaya Dhuli, Adha Adha Nakshyatra, Sabari
- Notable awards: Padma Shri (2025); Sahitya Akademi Award (2001); Odisha Sahitya Akademi Award (1986); Sarala Award (1992)

Pratibha Satpathy (born 27 November 1945) is a poet of Odia literature. She has been recognised as one of the leading poets of the country and has been honoured with the Sahitya Akademi Award.

In January 2025, she was honored with the Padma Shri, India's fourth-highest civilian award, by the Government of India.

== Biography ==
She has been writing poetry in Odia for more than forty years. She is editor of poetry magazine Udbhasa which is published quarterly. Previously she was the editor of the Odia magazine Istahaar for 25 years. Satpathy has also translated a number of famous English literary works by writers such as Pearl S. Buck into Odia language. Many of her books in Odia have been translated into Hindi by herself. She has won several awards.

== Major works ==
Poetry collections

- Ama Kavita (1962)
- Asta Janhara Elegy (1969)
- Grasta Samaya (1974)
- Sahada Sundari (1978)
- Niyata Vasudha ( 1980, II edition 1987)
- Nimishe Akshara (1985)
- Mahamegha (1988)
- Sabari (1991, II edition 2005)
- Tanmaya Dhuli (1996, II edition 2003)
- Adha Adha Nakshyatra (2001)
- Kahi Na Hele (2006)

Poetry collections in Hindi/English (translated from Odia) and their publishers

- Samaya Nahin Hai (1994); Radhakrishna Prakashan, New Delhi.
- Sabari (1996); Vani Prakashan, Daryaganj, New Delhi.
- Adha Adha Nakshyatra (2001); Medha Book, Sahadara, New Delhi.
- Tanmaya Dhuli (2004); Kendriya Sahitya Akademi, New Delhi.
- A Time of Rising (2003); Harananda Publications, New Delhi.
- For you Once, Everytime (2011); Vidya Puri, Cuttack

Literary criticisms/essays

- Kalpanara Abhisekha (1982, II edition 1997).
- Spandanara Bhumi (1994).
- Pratiphalana (1995).
- Post Modern Oriya Poetry & other Essays (1999, II edition 2006).
- Bharata Matara Looha (2002).
- Barnila Bhogapura (2004).
- Biography of Smt. Sarala Devi, by NBT.
- Ever Flows the River (2011) – A CD containing poetry recitations and appreciation of recognised poets and writers with soft sweet melody

Translations

- Arana Swapnara Rati ('The Hidden Flower' a novel by Pearl S. Buck), three editions.
- Kritadas ('The Slave' a novel by Isaac B. Singer), two editions
- Kalhana Charita (Central Sahitya Academy Translation Scheme)
- Nagara Manthan (Central Sahitya Academy Translation Scheme)
- Subramanium Bharati (NBT, New Delhi Translation Scheme)
- Sahasara Shikha ('The Crane Fly Early', a novel by Chinghiz Aitmatov)
- Bhinna Deshira Muhan (Latvian poetry by Maris Caklais & Raison)
- Memoirs (Shaishaba ru Samsara, 2008)
- Pratibha: from dust to star (with commentary from friends and critics in Odia, English, and Hindi; 2011)

== Awards and recognition ==
National

- 2025 - Padma Shri
- 2014 – Sahitya Bharati Samman-2013
- 2007 – Poetess Subhadra Kumari Chauhan Sahitya Samman by Rashtriya Hindi Akademi & Rupambara, Kolkata, 2007
- 2003 – R.G National Sadbhabana Award
- 2001 – Kendra Sahitya Akademi Award for Poetry Collection ‘Tanmaya Dhuli’
- 1999 – N.N. Thirumalamba Award of Karnataka for Poetry Collection ‘Adha Adha Nakshyatra’
- 1996 – Critic Circle India Award

Regional

- 2011 – Sahitya Prithivi
- 2008 – Utkal Surya Samman
- 2007 – Bhubaneswar Book Fair Award
- 2005 – S.B.I. Poetry Honor
- 2005 – SAIL Poetry Honor
- 2005 – J.K. Paper Mills Poetry Honor, Rayagada
- 1992 – Sarala Award of IMFA Charitable Trust
- 1986 – State (Orissa) Sahitya Akademi Award for Poetry Collection ‘Nimishe Akshara’
- 1985 – Dharitri-Samajbadi Society Poetry Award
- 1981 – Vishuba Award, Prajatantra Prachar Samiti, Orissa
- 1962 – Prajatantra Young Poet's Award

== See also ==
- List of Indian poets
- Odia literature
- Odia language
- List of Indian writers
