= Naseem Shafaie =

Poet

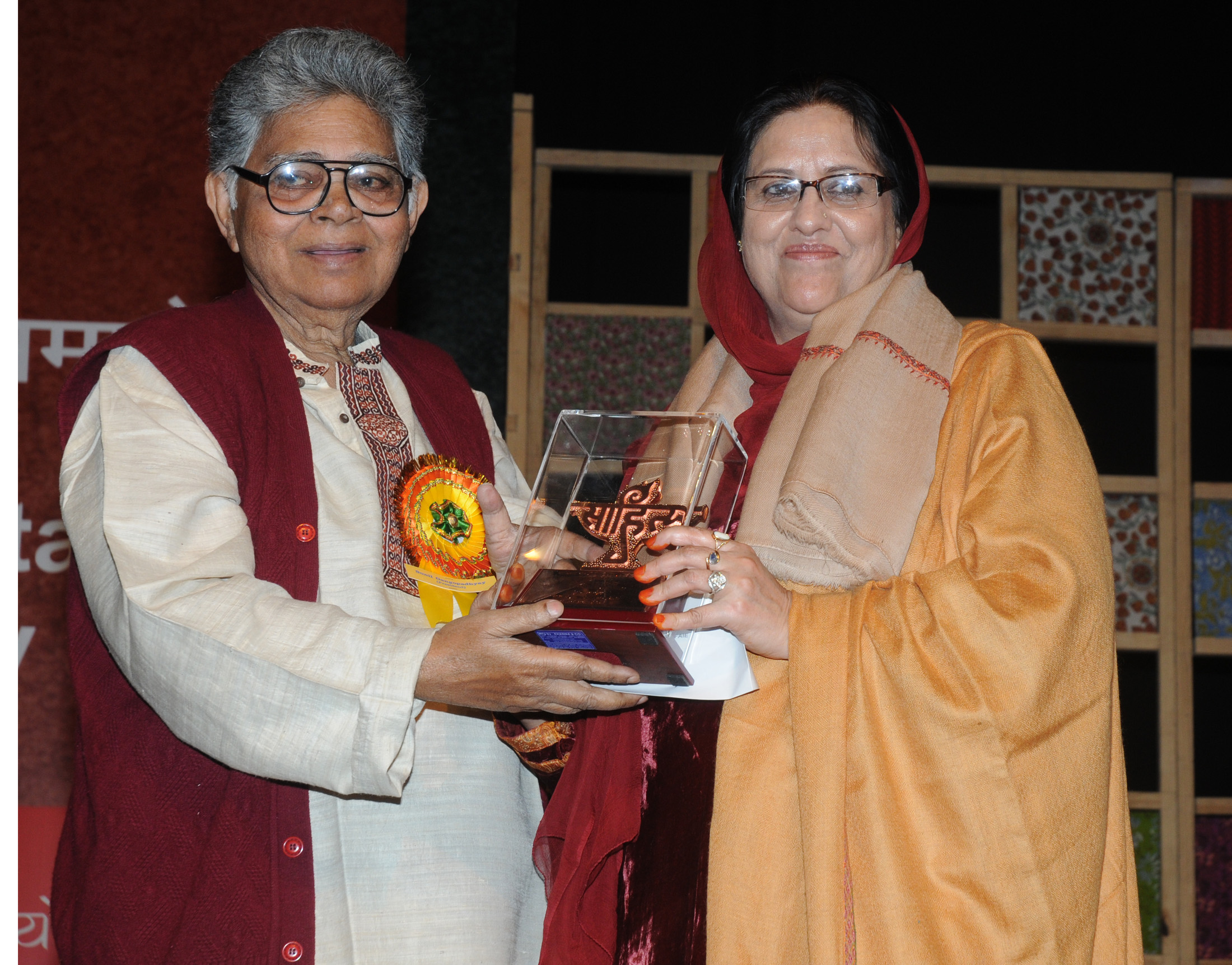
The President of Sahitya Akademi, Shri Sunil Gangopadhyay presented the Sahitya Akademi Awards, 2011, at a function, in New Delhi on February 14, 2012

Naseem Shafaie (born 1952) is a Kashmiri language poet who writes about a variety of topics including the turbulent atmosphere of Kashmir from a woman's perspective.

== Early life and education ==
Shafaie was born in a middle-class family in Srinagar. She has a post-graduate degree in Kashmiri language and literature from the University of Kashmir and is a teacher of Kashmiri language at a graduate level.

== Literary career ==
Shafaie has published two poetry collections. Derche Machrith (Open Windows) was published in 1999. Her second collection Na Thsay Na Aks (Neither Shadow Nor Reflection, 2009) won the 2011 Sahitya Akademi Award for Kashmiri making Shafaie the first Kashmiri woman to win the prize. Na Thsay Na Aks was also among the eight winners of the inaugural Tagore Literature Award in 2009. Her poetry has been translated into English, Urdu, Kannada, Tamil, Marathi and Telugu.

== Awards and recognitions ==
- Sahitya Akademi Award
- Tagore Award

== Bibliography ==
- 2009 :- Na Tschai Na Aks (Neither Shadow Nor Reflections)
- 1999 :- Derche Machrith (Open Windows)

== See also ==
- Kashmiri poetry
- Sahitya Akademi Award
- Mohammad Zahid
