= Taina Tudegesheva =

Russian poet (1957–2022)

- Тайана Тудегешева
- Born: Tudegesheva Taina Vasilyevna; 19 November 1957; Ust-Anzas, Tashtagolsky District, Kemerovo Oblast, RSFSR, USSR
- Died: 15 February 2022 (aged 64); Saint Petersburg, Russia
- Other names: Tayana Tudegesheva, Tatyana Tudegesheva
- Occupation: Poet

Taina Vasilyevna Tudegesheva (Russian: Тайана Васильевна Тудегешева; 19 November 1957 – 15 February 2022) was a Russian poet who composed in Russian and Shorian languages.

== Life and career ==
Born in Ust-Anzas, a village in the Kemerovo Oblast region, after her degree at the Irkutsk textile manufacturing school Tudegesheva graduated from the Maxim Gorky Literature Institute in Moscow. She started composing poetry as an adolescent, and mainly composed her works in Shorian language.

Tudegesheva made her literary debut in 1998, with the collection Шория моя ("My Shorya"). Poems by her have been published in several literary magazines and anthologies. She was part of the Union of Russian Writers from 1999.

Beyond her literary activity, Tudegesheva was the founder of the museum of Shorian culture history and served as deputy director of the Novokuznetsk City Palace of Culture. She died on 15 February 2022, at the age of 64.
