= Sukirtharani =

Indian poet

Sukirtharani is an Indian feminist poet who is widely acclaimed for her contribution to contemporary Dalit and Tamil literature.

Sukirtharani is also a Tamil teacher at the Government Girls High School in Ranipet District, and has a master's degree in economics and Tamil literature. Her works include six published collection of poems. The works themselves have been described as celebratory towards the female body and a chastisement of the oppressive caste system which encapsulate a dual experience of being born both a female and a dalit. Her works have also been noted to have an eco-feminist approach to them. She has featured alongside the poets Kutti Revathi, Malathi Maithri and Salma in Lakshmi Holmström's translated compilation Wild Girls Wicked Words. Holmström in her anthology describes Sukirtharani as one who seeks "an infant language with all the rough and physical reality of new birth, sticky with blood".

== Awards ==
She has received a number of awards such as the Thevamagal Kavithoovi Award, the Pengal Munnani Achiever Award and the Puthumaipitthan Memorial Award.

== Selected works ==
=== Collections ===
- Kaipattri Yen Kanavu Kel
- Iravu Mirugam
- Kaamatthipoo
- Theendapadaatha Muttham
- Avalai Mozhipeyarthal
- Ippadikku Yeval
