= TISS Mumbai =

Private business school in India

- Former names: Sir Dorabji Tata Graduate School of Social Work (until 1944)
- Type: University campus
- Established: 1936
- Parent institution: Tata Institute of Social Sciences
- Location: Mumbai, Maharashtra, 400088, India; 19.044257°N 72.912494°E
- Campus: Urban
- Website: tiss.edu
- Location in Maharashtra TISS Mumbai (India)

TISS was established in 1936 as Sir Dorabji Tata Graduate School of Social Work in Mumbai. It was renamed to its current name Tata Institute of Social Sciences in 1944. TISS Mumbai is the main campus of the TISS. In the year 1964, it was deemed to be a university under Section 3 of the University Grants Commission Act (UGC), 1956. TISS Mumbai provides various M.A., M.Phil & Ph.D programs. Over the years, TISS Mumbai is well known for its contribution through research in social work, social sciences, human resources management & health systems.

== Schools ==
TISS Mumbai hosts the following Schools

- School of Education - Master's level courses in Elementary Education
- School of Development Studies - Master's level courses in Development Studies and Women's Studies
- School of Habitat Studies - Master's level courses in Climate Change and Sustainability Studies, Urban Policy, Regulatory Governance, and Water Policy and Governance
- School of Health Systems Studies - Master's level courses in Health Administration, Hospital Administration, Social Epidemiology and Health Policy
- School of Human Ecology - Master's level courses in Applied Psychology, Clinical Psychology and Counselling Psychology.
- School of Law, Rights and Constitutional Governance - L.L.M. in Access to Justice
- School of Management and Labour Studies - Master's level courses in Human Resource Management, Labour Relations, Social Entrepreneurship, Globalisation and Labour, 14 month Executive Post Graduate Diploma in Organisation Development and Change (EPGDODC) from Mumbai, Delhi and Bangalore.
- School of Media and Cultural Studies - Master's level courses in Media and Cultural Studies
- School of Social Work - Master's level courses in Social Work with Children & Families, Criminology & Justice, Community Organisation & Development Practice, Dalit & Tribal Studies and Action, Disability Studies & Action, Livelihoods and Social Entrepreneurship, Mental Health, Public Health, Women-Centred Practice
- Jamsetji Tata School of Disaster Studies - Master's programme in Disaster Management

== Independent Centres ==
- Centre for Education Innovation and Action Research
- Centre for Excellence on Adolescents and Youth
- Centre for Lifelong Learning
- Centre for Studies in Sociology of Education
- Centre for Study of Social Exclusion and Inclusive Policies
- Centre for Library and Information Management Studies & SDTM Library
- Jamsetji Tata Centre for Disaster Management

== Resource Centres ==
- Computer Centre
- Publications Unit

== Sir Dorabji Tata Memorial Library ==
The library established in 1936, is one of the leading social science libraries in the country. The library was named as "Sir Dorabji Tata Memorial Library" on 3 May 2002 in the memory of late Sir Dorabjii Tata. Indian Library Association conferred the library with L. M. Padhya Best University Library Award in 2008.

Currently, the library houses about 123,000 books and 10,298 journals in principle domains of social sciences. The library also operates a centre with assistive technologies "M K Tata Centre for the Visually Challenged".

== Major Ongoing Field Action Projects ==
- M-Ward transformation programme
- I-Access
- Koshish
- Prayaas
- Towards Advocacy Networking and Developmental Action (TANDA)
- RCI-VAW: The Resource Centre for Interventions on Violence against Women
- Tarasha: A community-based project for rehabilitation of women recovering from mental illness
- iCALL: Initiating Concern for All
- Urban India Research Facility'
- Resource Cell for Juvenile Justice (RCJJ)

== See also ==
- TISS Hyderabad
