= Tapan Kumar Pradhan =

Indian writer

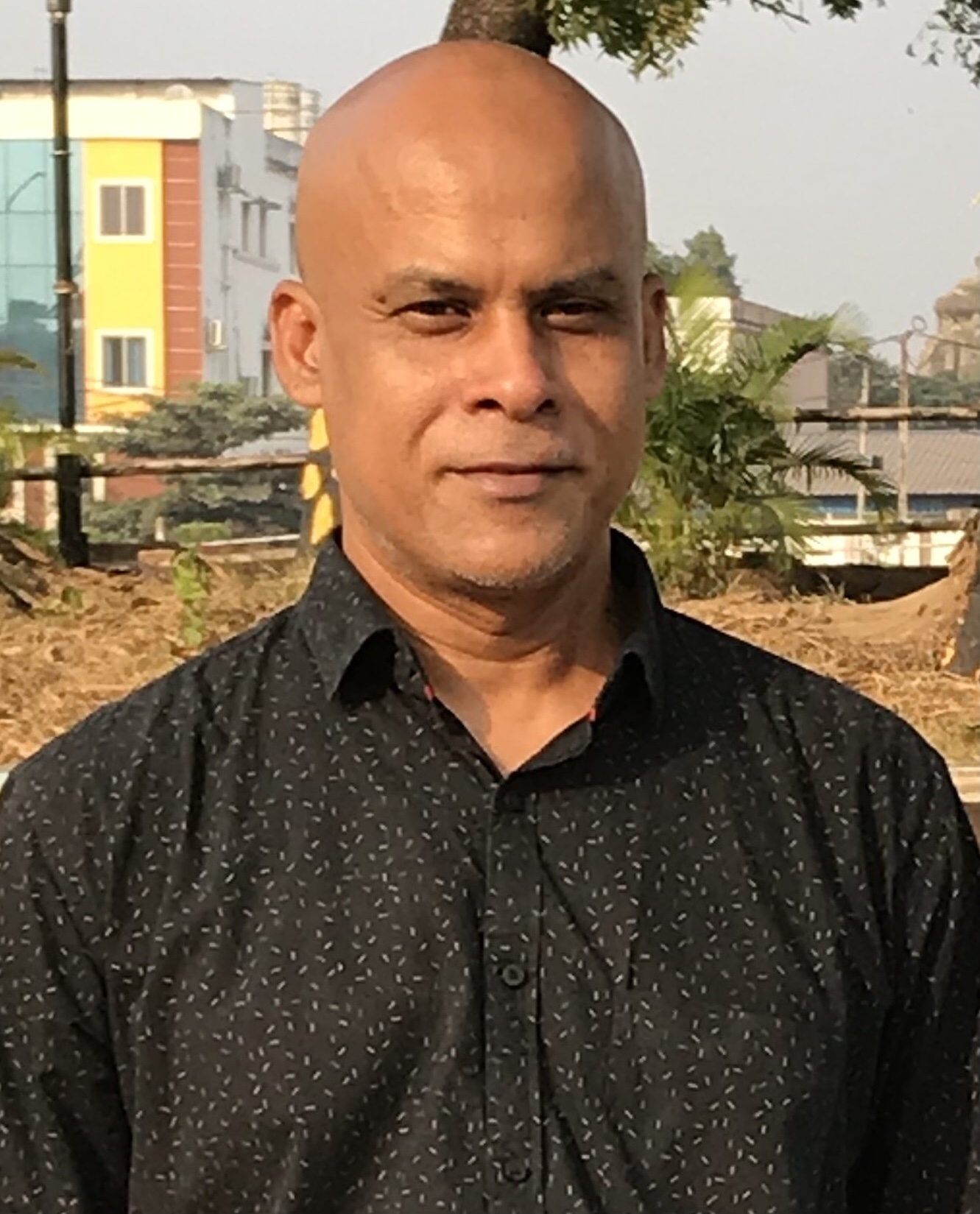
- Pradhan in 2021
- Education: Doctorate
- Alma mater: Utkal University, BJB College
- Occupations: Poet, activist, researcher
- Spouse: Suvashree H
- Children: 2
- Writing career
- Language: Odia, English, Hindi
- Period: 21st century
- Genres: Poetry, essays
- Subject: Human rights
- Notable work: Kalahandi
- Notable awards: Sahitya Akademi

Tapan Kumar Pradhan (born 22 October 1972) is an Indian poet, writer and translator from Odisha. He is best known for his poem collection "Kalahandi" which was awarded second place in Sahitya Akademi's Golden Jubilee Indian Literature Translation Prize for Poetry in 2007. His other works include "Equation", "I, She and the Sea", "Wind in the Afternoon" and "Dance of Shiva".

== Early life and education ==
Pradhan studied at Laxmisagar Highschool, BJB College and Utkal University. He also studied briefly at University of Hyderabad, TISS and IIT Kanpur where he discontinued. His father Arakshit Pradhan was an engineer under Government of Odisha but left job in protest against rampant corruption in Government projects. After Arakshit Pradhan left for Himalayas, the family was brought up by his wife Kumudini Pradhan.

== Award-winning works ==
In 2007, Pradhan received the Indian Express Citizen for Peace prize from Shyam Benegal for his essays on communal harmony. He has also won First Prize in All-India Inter-bank Hindi Essay Competition for 2007–08, a prize he also won in 2006–07 for his essays on micro-finance and financial inclusion. He also won First Prize in the RBIA Silver Jubilee essay competition on Future of Central Banking conducted by Reserve Bank of India in 2007–08. He was the First Prize winner in RBI Brand Building Competition, 2007 for his bold satirical essay "Dreaming the RBI Brand", which created shock waves in the Reserve Bank fraternity. During his student days he had won many literary prizes including Upasika Kamaladevi Award for essays on Buddhism, Shatadru prize for short story and Ankur prize for poetry etc. He was Utkal University literary champion during 1993–94. Pradhan's poem "The Buddha Smiled" won commendation first prize in All India Poetry Competition 2013 conducted by Poetry Society (India).

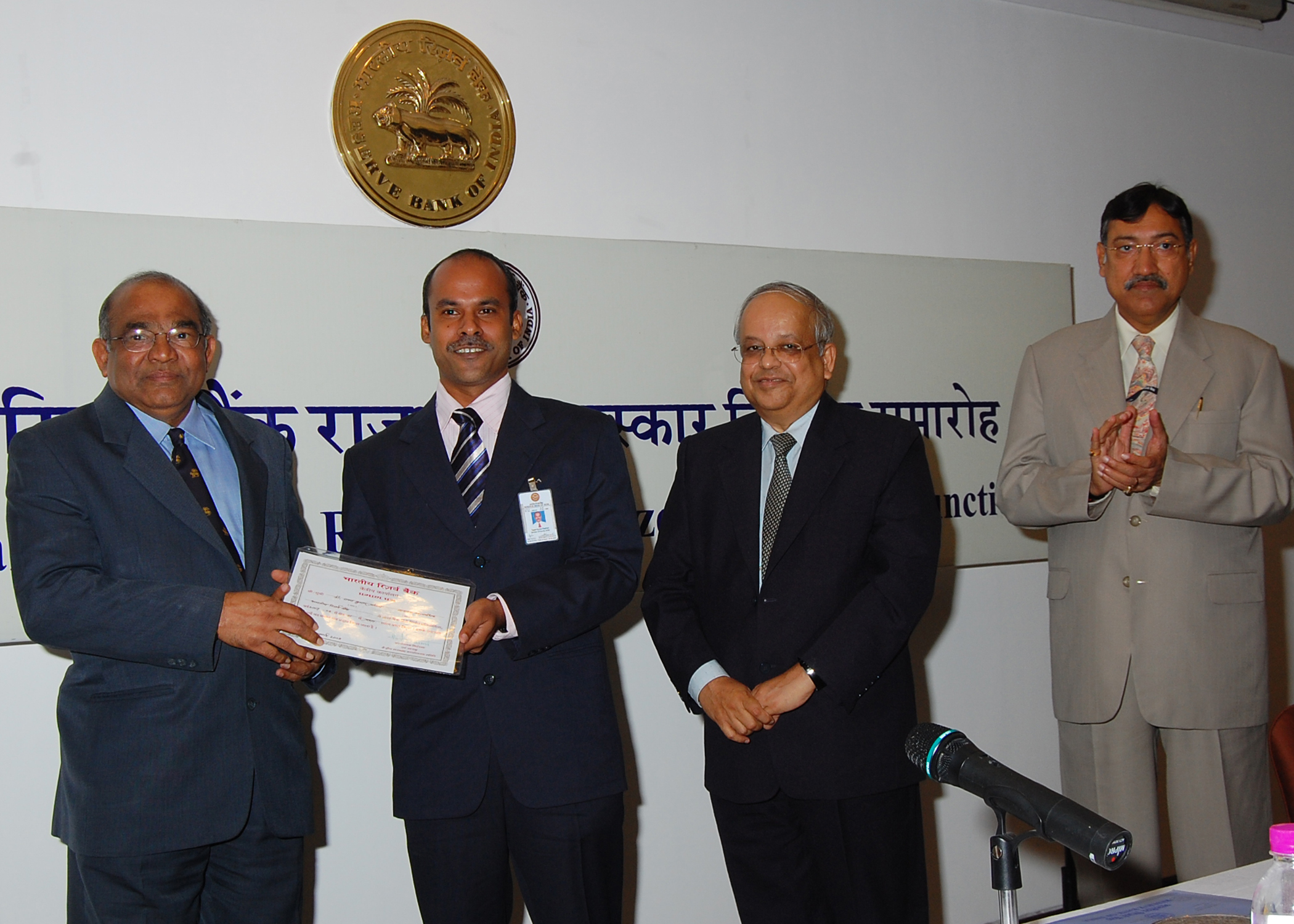
Pradhan receiving Inter-Bank Essay First Prize from RBI Governor

== Other literary works ==
Pradhan's works encompass both secular and spiritual literature. His poems, essays, sketches and short stories have been published in the journals Indian Literature, Journal of Poetry Society, The Statesman, Times of India and The Samaja. His book “Kalahandi” has been included in literature syllabus of several colleges and universities. He has also co-authored, edited and commented on the spiritual works of German Christian poet Antony Theodore and mystic Kashmiri poet Lalitha Iyer showing the underlying unity of all world religions. His skillful translation of Urdu poetry helped Munawwar Rana's ghazals reach global audience.

== Human rights and crusade against corruption ==
In 2009, Pradhan petitioned the Central Information Commission of India to increase transparency in the Performance Appraisal System in RBI. Pradhan was first person in RBI and public sector employee to obtain his PAR report through RTI Act. As against CIC's view that PAR was "confidential personal information", Pradhan contended that PAR is the appraisal committee's impersonal evaluation of the public service rendered by public servants in their impersonal capacity in a public organisation; and hence there was nothing "personal" about PAR. Following his petition, RBI began disclosing PAR reports to all employees before moving over to a more objective method of appraisal called Performance Management System. In the words of Smt Usha Thorat, the ex-Deputy Governor of RBI, Pradhan makes "ingenious use of the RTI Act" to redress individual grievances.

== Professional career ==
Under UGC Fellowship, Pradhan was awarded the degree of Doctor of Philosophy in 2001 for his dissertation on Structural and Economic Dimensions of Communal Conflict. He has researched the Kandh-Pana conflict in Kandhamal district, Hindu-Muslim relations in Bhadrak and Harijan-Savarna caste dynamics at Brahmabarada in Jajpur district of Odisha. He taught Sociology at Fakir Mohan University, Balasore, before joining Reserve Bank of India in 1999 as a Grade-B officer. In 2014, Pradhan left RBI to join Government of Odisha as Director and Additional Secretary in Finance Department. He established transparent score-based ranking of banks on Financial Inclusion parameters for awarding of Government business.

== Personal life ==
In 2001 Pradhan married Suvashree, a trained Odishi dancer. The couple have a son and a daughter.

== Bibliography ==
- Kalahandi - The Untold Story (2020)
- I, She and the Sea (2019)
- Wind in the Afternoon (2017)
- Kandhamal Riots - Origin & the Aftermath (2015)
- भारत में कृषि पर्यटन व कृषि वाणिज्य - चुनौतियाँ तथा संभावनाएं (2009)
- Structural & Economic Dimensions of Communal Conflict in India (2002)

=== Edited works ===
- Psalms of Love (2021)
- I Am Your Baby, Mother (2020)
- Songs of Lust and Love (2020)
- Jesus Christ in Love (2019)
- Songs of Sadness (2019)

=== Translations ===
- Kalahandi (2007) :- from Odia କଳାହାଣ୍ଡି by author
- Ghazals (2022) :- from Urdu غزلیں by Munawwar Rana

=== Journal articles ===
- Tayade, Dr S. A. (2021). "Gender Subaltern in Tapan Kumar Pradhan's "Kalahandi" & "Khap's Diktat"". Lang Lit. 3: 119–125. ISSN 2349-5189.
- Pradhan, Tapan Kumar (2007). "Kalahandi". Indian Literature. 51 (6): 47–48. JSTOR 23347624.
- Pradhan, Tapan Kumar (2022). "Munawwar Rana in English translation". Antonym. 2 (1): 9–12.
- Pradhan, Tapan Kumar (2007). "Hour of Coming". Indian Literature. 51 (6): 49–51. JSTOR 23347625.
- Pradhan, Tapan Kumar (2022). "Remembering Father". Creative Flights. 3 (1): 74–75. ISSN 2582-6158.
- Pradhan, Tapan Kumar (2013). ""Dance of Shiva" and Other Poems". Journal of the Poetry Society India. 15 (1): 9-13.
- Pradhan, Dr Tapan Kumar (2023). "A Framework for Measuring Financial Inclusion in India - Bridging Gaps Between Theory & Practice". Journal of Financial Counselling & Planning. 34 (2): 169–183. ISSN 1052-3073.
- प्रधान, तपन कुमार (2008). "वित्तीय समावेशन में बैंकों की भूमिका". बैंकिंग चिंतन. 20 (8).

=== Book articles ===
- Pradhan, Tapan Kumar (2025), "Equation", in Moin, Bilal (ed.), The Penguin Book of Poems, London: Penguin - Hamish Hamilton, pp. 670–672, ISBN 978-0143470687
- Pradhan, Tapan Kumar (2007), "Bhadrak : Four Pillars of Harmony", in Indian, Express (ed.), Living With Differences, Mumbai: Citizens For Peace, pp. 28–43

=== Books on the author ===
- Surhone, Lambert M.; Tennoe, Mariam T. (2011). Tapan Kumar Pradhan. Beau Basin: International Books. ISBN 978-61-360172-4-2.

== See also ==
- Sahitya Akademi Golden Jubilee Awards
- Sahitya Akademi Award to Odisha Writers
- Antony Theodore
- Rana Nayar

== Notes ==
- see references
