= Alphonse Allain =

French poet (1924–2022)

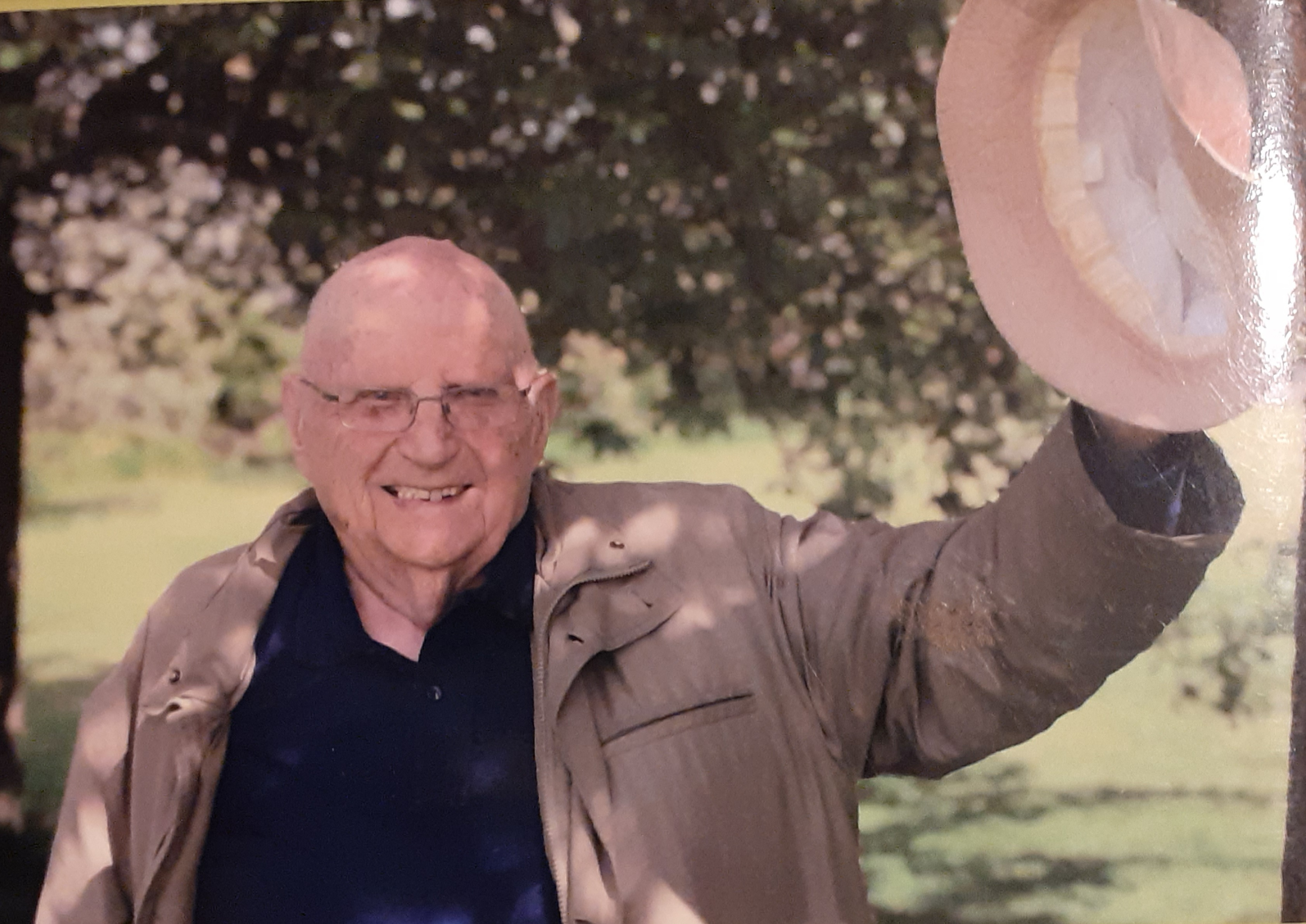
- Born: 21 December 1924
- Died: 20 June 2022 (aged 97)
- Occupation: Poet

Alphonse Allain (21 December 1924 – 20 June 2022) was a French poet who wrote in the Norman language.

== Biography ==
Allain wrote several collections of poems, such as Histouères et poésies normaundes, Dauns nout' prêchi, and Les gens d'ichin. He also wrote fables and was the author of the libretto Ouées de Pirou, a musical comedy written in Norman and produced by Magène and presented at the Château de Flamanville in 2006. Eleven of his poems were converted into songs performed by Daniel Bourdelès on the CD Grans de sablle, produced in 2008. He remained active in poetry into old age, supported by local media on the Cotentin Peninsula.

Alphonse Allain died on 20 June 2022 at the age of 97.
