= Pallavi Singh =

UK-based Indian writer and business historian

Pallavi Padma-Uday is a UK-based Indian writer and business historian. She is the author of the poetry collections Orisons in the Dark (2023) and Lola in Belfast (2024).

== Early life and education ==
Padma-Uday studied economic history at the London School of Economics and Political Science as an LSE-India scholar. She trained as a journalist at the Asian College of Journalism, Chennai.

== Career ==
As a business historian, Padma-Uday's research examines the evolution of business groups in modern India.

She previously worked as a journalist in India, reporting on political economy and business for publications including Hindustan Times, The Indian Express, and Mint. She also led audience engagement and marketing for News Corp companies in New Delhi.

== Literary work ==
Her debut poetry collection, Orisons in the Dark, was published by Writers Workshop in April 2023. The collection was reviewed in outlets including ABP Live and TV9.

Her second collection, Lola in Belfast, was published in May 2024. The book was featured at the Belfast Book Festival in 2024.. An excerpt from the collection was also published by Scroll.in.

Her writing has appeared in literary journals across the UK, Ireland and South Asia including The Honest Ulsterman, Unapologetic, Abridged, The Galway Review, Muse India, and The Aleph Review. She also contributed a short story to Trumpet 14, published by Poetry Ireland.

Her books are held in the collections of the National Library of Ireland.

== Reception ==
Padma-Uday's poetry has received scholarly attention in studies of Indian writing in English. Narayan and Nagpal (2024, 2025), in selective surveys of the field, include readings of her poems, quoting and analyzing their thematic and stylistic features within contemporary literary developments.

The collection Lola in Belfast was also reviewed by Scroll.in, which highlighted its engagement with themes of identity, migration, and the negotiation between personal and cultural belonging.

== Honours and recognition ==
In September 2025, Padma-Uday was selected for the Irish Writers Centre's Evolution Programme 2025–2026, a six-month development programme for 12 published writers.

== Bibliography ==
- Orisons in the Dark. Kolkata: Writers Workshop, 2023. ISBN 978-81-961291-1-8
- Lola in Belfast. Kolkata: Writers Workshop, 2024. ISBN 978-81-968192-1-7
