= Munawwar Rana =

Indian poet (1952–2024)

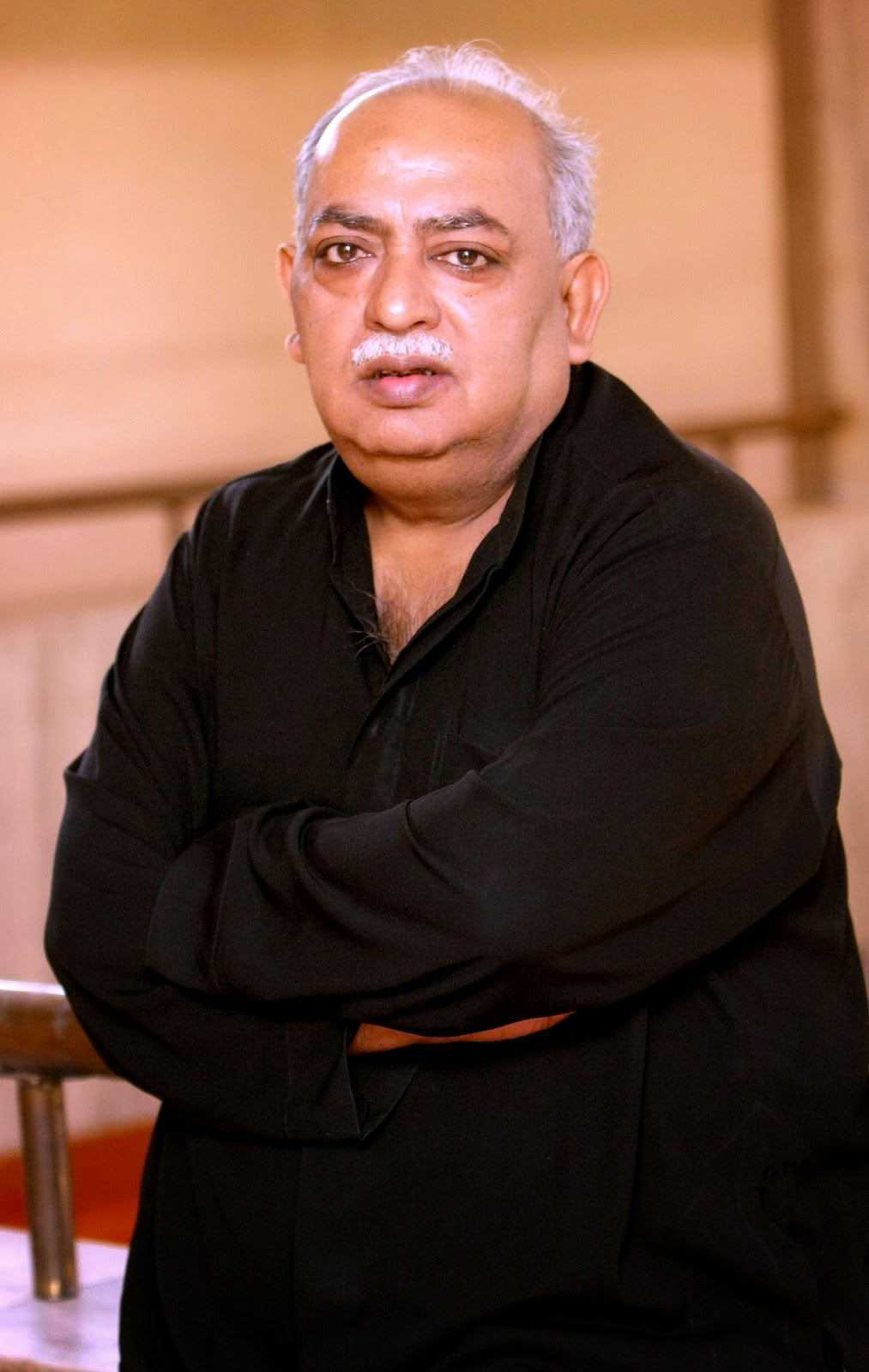
- Born: 26 November 1952; Raebareli, Uttar Pradesh, India
- Died: 14 January 2024 (aged 71); Lucknow, Uttar Pradesh, India
- Occupations: Urdu poet, writer
- Spouse: Raina Rana
- Children: 5
- Writing career
- Period: 20th century
- Genres: Poetry, Ghazal
- Notable awards: Sahitya Akademi Award for Urdu Literature (2014; returned in 2015)
- Website: munawwarrana.in

Munawwar Rana (26 November 1952 – 14 January 2024) was an Indian Urdu poet and political influencer. He was honoured with the Sahitya Akademi Award in 2014 for his poem Shahdaba.

== Early life ==
Munawwar Rana was born on 26 November 1952 in Raebareli in Uttar Pradesh, India. He spent most of his life in Kolkata, West Bengal.

== Poetic style ==
Rana wrote in Urdu and Awadhi, but avoided the Persian and Arabic vocabulary which distinguish Urdu from Hindi. This makes his poetry accessible to Indian audiences and explains his popularity in the poetic meets held in non-Urdu areas. His poetry exuding love for mother and motherland reached global audience through skillful translation by fellow Indian poet Dr Tapan Kumar Pradhan.

== Ghazals ==
Munawwar published several nazms and ghazals with a distinct style of writing. Most of his shers (couplets) have "mother" as the centre point of his love. His Urdu ghazals have been translated into English by Tapan Kumar Pradhan.

== Controversies ==
=== Ram Mandir verdict ===
In August 2020, Munawwar Rana accused former Chief Justice of India Ranjan Gogoi of "selling himself" to deliver the Ayodhya verdict. He further said that it was not justice, it was an order. His comment could not be published due to its highly derogatory nature.

=== Murder of Samuel Paty ===
In October 2020, Rana spoke in support of the murder of Samuel Paty, a French school teacher who used two caricatures of Muhammad from the pages of Charlie Hebdo in a class on freedom of expression. Speaking to the media, Munawwar said that the caricatures were made to defame Muhammad and Islam and that such acts force people to take extreme steps as in the case of France. He further said that he too would have done the same had he been in his place. When asked during the interview, if he endorsed the killings, Mr. Rana repeated, "I will kill [that person]."

The Uttar Pradesh Police charged him under Indian Penal Code (IPC) 153A (Promoting enmity between different groups on the ground of religion), 295A (Deliberate and malicious acts, intended to outrage religious feelings of any class by insulting its religion), 298 (Uttering, words, etc., with deliberate intent to wound the religious feelings of any person), 505(1)(b) (Punishes those with intent to cause, or which is likely to cause, fear or alarm among the public, or any section of the public whereby any person may be induced to commit an offence against the state or against the public tranquility), 505(2) (Whoever makes, publishes or circulates any statement, rumour or report, with intent to incite, or which is likely to incite, any class or community of persons to commit any offence against any other class or community) and IT Act 67 and 66.

Talking to a news agency, Rana said:

I stand by my statement. "Na dal badlu hoon, na byan badlu hoon." [Neither do I change sides, nor do I change my statements].

=== Statement in favour of Taliban ===
Rana refused to recognize the Taliban as a terrorist organization, amid an ongoing controversy over the statements made in the organisation's favour.

=== Comparing Maharishi Valmiki To Taliban ===
In August 2020 while talking to a channel, Rana said:

Valmiki became a God after he wrote the Ramayana, before that he was a dacoit. A person's character can change. Similarly, the Taliban, for now, are terrorists, but people and characters change. When you talk about Valmiki, you will have to talk about his past. In your religion, you make anyone God. But he was a writer, and he wrote the Ramayana, but we are not in competition here.

In response, Madhya Pradesh Police registered the case under IPC Section 505(2) (statements conducing to public mischief) and it was forwarded to Hazratganj police station at Lucknow in UP. Another FIR registered against him mentioned IPC Sections 505 (2) (public mischief) and the Scheduled Caste and Scheduled Tribe (Prevention of Atrocities) Act.

The Allahabad High Court refused to quash an FIR filed against him for allegedly comparing Ramayana author Valmiki, with the Taliban. The division bench of Justice Ramesh Sinha and Justice Saroj Yadav asked Rana's lawyer, "Why do you (Rana) make such kind of remarks. Why don't you (Rana) do what your work is?"

== Personal life ==
Munawwar Rana was married and lived in Lucknow.

His son Tabrez Rana was arrested by Rae Bareli police in August 2021 for allegedly having staged a shootout against himself in June in order to frame his uncle and cousin in a property dispute.

Rana died on 14 January 2024 at the age of 71 from throat cancer at Sanjay Gandhi Post Graduate Institute of Medical Sciences. He is buried in the Aishbagh Qabristan cemetery, and the funeral prayer was held at Nadvatul Ulama Lucknow. Akhilesh Yadav and Javed Akhtar joined the funeral.

Akhtar said

Today, there has been a big loss to Urdu, poetry and culture of India. This breed is slowly disappearing. First Rahat Saheb and now Munawwar. They cannot be compensated and I pray that their family and relatives get courage in this difficult time.

Narendra Modi, the prime minister of India, condoled the death of Rana and said

Pained by the passing away of Shri Munawwar Rana Ji. He made rich contributions to Urdu literature and poetry. Condolences to his family and admirers. May his soul rest in peace.

Nitish Kumar, chief minister of Bihar, condoled his death and said

Late Munawwar Rana was a famous poet. Apart from Urdu, he used to write in Hindi and Awadhi languages. He was awarded the 2014 Sahitya Akademi Award for Urdu literature. The demise of Munawwar Rana has caused an irreparable loss to the literary world, especially the Urdu literary. I prayed to God to give him an important place in heaven and give strength to his family to bear this irreparable loss.

== Awards ==
- Sahitya Akademi Award for Urdu Literature (2014). He returned the award about one year later, vowing to never again accept a government award due to rising intolerance in the country, leading to state-sponsored communalism.
- In 2012 he was awarded Maati Ratan Samman by Shaheed Shodha Sansthan for his services to Urdu literature.

== See also ==
- List of Sahitya Akademi Award winners for Urdu
- Ranjan Gogoi
- Tapan Kumar Pradhan
- Murder of Samuel Paty
