= Anamika (poet) =

Indian writer, poet and literary critic (born 1961)

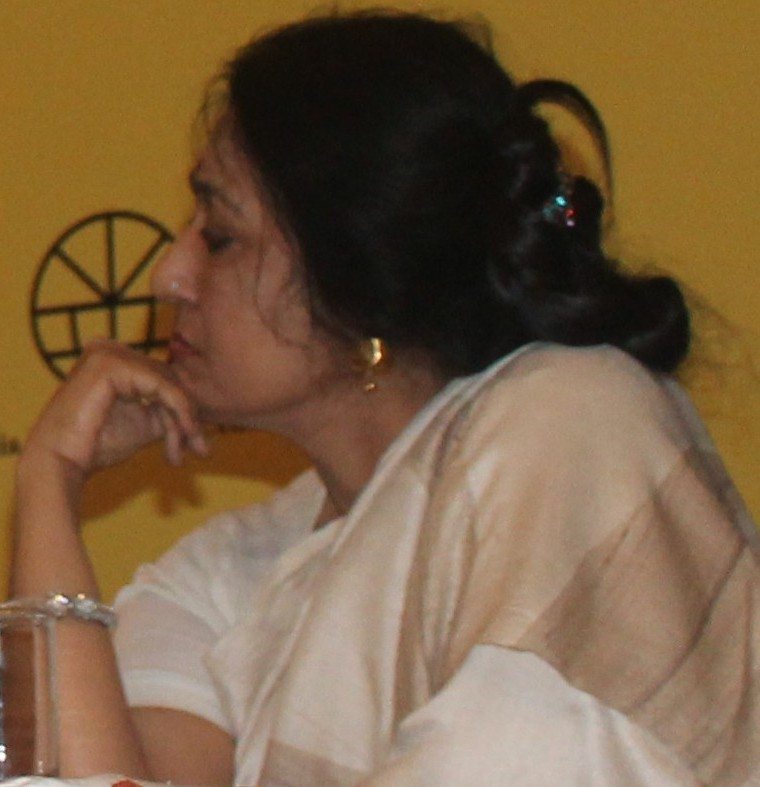
- Anamika at SAARC Festival of Literature 2017 in New Delhi
- Born: 17 August 1961 (age 65); Muzaffarpur, Bihar, India
- Education: University of Lucknow, MA in English literature, PhD, DLit
- Occupations: Poet, Writer
- Writing career
- Notable awards: Sahitya Academy Award in 2020.

Anamika (born 17 August 1961) is a contemporary Indian poet, social worker and novelist writing in Hindi, and a critic writing in English. My Typewriter Is My Piano is her collection of poems translated into English. She is known for her feminist poetry.

== Early life and education ==
Anamika was born on 17 August 1961 in Muzaffarpur, Bihar. She pursued a Master of Arts degree in English literature from the University of Lucknow in 1985. Her current topic of research as a fellow at Teen Murti Bhawan, Delhi is "A Comparative Study of Women in Contemporary British and Hindi poetry". She is currently teaching English Literature at a college affiliated to the University of Delhi.

== Works ==
=== Poetry collections ===
- Tokri mein Digant
- Anushtup
- Doob-dhaan
- Khurdari Hatheliyaan
- Paani ko Sab Yaad thaa

== Awards ==
- 2020 – Sahitya Akademi Award for her poetry Tokri Mein Digant 'Their Gatha': 2014 She is the first and only female poet to have won the prize in the award's 65-year history.
