= New Stories from the South =

Short story anthology series (1986–2010; 2026–)

New Stories from the South is an annual compilation of short stories published by Algonquin Books of Chapel Hill between 1986 and 2010 and billed as the year's best stories written by Southern writers or about the Southern United States. The series has been revived for publication by Blair of Durham, North Carolina, and will resume in fall 2026. The stories are collected from more than 100 literary magazines, including The Atlantic, Harper's Magazine, The New Yorker, the Oxford American, The Paris Review, Ploughshares, and The Southern Review.

Shannon Ravenel, then the editor of the annual Best American Short Stories anthology, launched the New Stories from the South series in 1986 and compiled and edited every volume until 2006. To mark the third decade of the series, Algonquin invited author and Guggenheim Fellow Allan Gurganus to be guest editor.

New Stories from the South has collected the work of many prominent modern American writers, including Steve Almond, Russell Banks, John Barth, Madison Smartt Bell, Wendell Berry, Roy Blount Jr., Larry Brown, James Lee Burke, Robert Olen Butler, Andre Dubus, William Faulkner (a newly discovered story), Barry Hannah, Nanci Kincaid, Aaron Gwyn, Barbara Kingsolver, Bobbie Ann Mason, Reynolds Price, Keith Lee Morris, John Sayles, Lucy Corin, Lee Smith, and Peter Taylor.

== List of Compilations and Stories ==
New Stories from the South: The Year's Best, 1986. Edited by Shannon Ravenel. ISBN 9780912697406.

- Bridging by Max Apple
- Triptych by Madison Smartt Bell
- Tongues of Flame by Mary Ward Brown
- Communion by Suzanne Brown
- The Convict by James Lee Burke
- Air by Ron Carlson
- Says Velma by Doug Crowell
- Martha Jean by Leon V. Driskell
- The World Record Holder by Elizabeth Harris
- Something Good for Ginnie by Mary Hood
- Summer of the Magic Show by David Huddle
- Holding on by Gloria Norris
- Umpire by Kurt Rheinheimer
- Delivery by W.A. Smith
- Something to Lose by Wallace Whatley
- Wallwork by Luke Whisnant
- Chicken Simon by Sylvia Wilkinson

New Stories from the South: The Year's Best, 1987. Edited by Shannon Ravenel. ISBN 9780912697666.

- Across from the Motoheads by Luke Whisnant
- Lady of Spain by Robert Taylor
- Heart by Marly Swick
- Life on the moon by Lee Smith
- Where Pelham fell by Bob Shacochis
- The Pure in heart by Peggy Payne
- Sugar, the eunuchs / and Big G.B. by Lewis Nordan
- Vincristine by Trudy Lewis
- After Moore by Mary Hood
- Dressed like Summer Leaves by Andre Dubus
- Magnolia by Vickie Covington
- Heroic Measures / Vital Signs by John William Corrington
- Peter the Rock by Rosanne Coggeshall
- Edward and Jill by Robert Boswell
- Dependents by James Gordon Bennett

New Stories from the South: The Year's Best, 1988. Edited by Shannon Ravenel. ISBN 9780912697901.

- Happiness of the Garden Variety by Mark Richard
- Game Farm by John Rolfe Gardiner
- Half Measures by Trudy Lewis
- The Man who Knew Belle Starr by Richard Bausch
- First Union Blues by Jill McCorkle
- Voice by Eve Shelnutt
- Limited Access by Annette Sanford
- The Watch by Rick Bass
- George Bailey Fishing by Ellen Akins
- Rose-Johnny by Barbara Kingsolver
- Gas by Jim Hall
- Facing the Music by Larry Brown
- The Crumb by Sunny Rogers
- Belonging by Pam Durban
- Like the Old Wolf in all those Wolf Stories by Nanci Kincaid
- Metropolitan by Charlotte Holmes

New Stories from the South: The Year's Best, 1989. Edited by Shannon Ravenel. ISBN 9780945575276.

- Preface by Shannon Ravenel
- A Hank of Hair, a Piece of Bone by Lewis Nordan
- Six White Horses by Annette Sanford
- Samaritans by Larry Brown
- Wish by Bobbie Ann Mason
- Customs of the Country by Madison Smartt Bell
- Playing by David Huddle
- Coupon for Blood by Sandy Huss
- Hot Springs by Paula Sharp
- Wild Horses by Rick Bass
- Where She Was by Kelly Cherry
- Strays by Mark Richard
- Pacific Theater by James Gordon Bennett
- The Rain of Terror by Frank Manley
- Homes by Kurt Rheinheimer
- It Wasn't All Dancing by Mary Ward Brown

New Stories from the South: The Year's Best, 1990. Edited by Shannon Ravenel. ISBN 9780945575528.

- Spittin' Image of a Baptist boy by Nanci Kincaid
- The Cellar of Runt Conroy by Lewis Nordan
- Family by Lance Olsen
- Feast of the Earth, Ransom of the Clay by Mark Richard
- Just Outside the B.T. by Moira Crone
- The Kind of Light that shines on Texas by Reginald McKnight
- Letter to the lady of the house by Richard Bausch
- The Boarder by Greg Johnson
- Crow Man by Tom Bailey
- Changing Names by Clyde Edgerton
- Les Femme Creoles by Bob Shacochis
- Zoe by Molly Best Tinsley
- Where we land by Ron Robinson
- Sleep by Larry Brown
- Fishbone by Donna Trussell
- The History of Rodney by Rick Bass

New Stories from the South: The Year's Best, 1991. Edited by Shannon Ravenel. ISBN 9780945575825.

- Cousin Aubrey by Peter Taylor
- The Arabesque by Barbara Hudson
- Intensive Care by Lee Smith
- The Screened Porch by Susan Starr Richards
- Relic by Robert Olen Butler
- With Jazz by Bobbie Ann Mason
- A Life or Death Matter by Elizabeth Hunnewell
- Big Bad Love by Larry Brown
- South of Kittatinny by Hilding Johnson
- The Birds for Christmas by Mark Richard
- Poinsett's Bridge by Robert Morgan
- Waiting for Hard Times to End by Jill McCorkle
- Black Cat Bone by Thomas Phillips Brewer
- In the Loyal Mountains by Rick Bass
- This is not the Picture Show by Nanci Kincaid
- His Final Mother by Reynolds Price

New Stories from the South: The Year's Best, 1992. Edited by Shannon Ravenel. ISBN 9781565120112.

- The Bubba Stories by Lee Smith
- Lilacs by Abraham Verghese
- A New Life by Mary Ward Brown
- A Sturdy Pair of Shoes that Fit Good by Nanci Kincaid
- Death Crown by Robert Morgan
- Clearwater and Latissimus by Alison Baker
- The Winnowing of Mrs. Schuping by Padgett Powell
- Texas City, 1947 by James Lee Burke
- Quitting Smoking by Reginald McKnight
- Explaining Death to the Dog by Susan Perabo
- A Good Scent from a Strange Mountain by Robert Olen Butler
- The Witch of Owl Mountain Springs: An Account of Her Remarkable Powers by Peter Taylor
- Economics by Elizabeth Seydel Morgan
- Like Hands on a Cave Wall by Karen Minton
- A Roadside Resurrection by Larry Brown
- You have Chosen Cake by Dan Leone
- After Memphis by Patricia Lear

New Stories from the South: The Year's Best, 1993. Edited by Shannon Ravenel. ISBN 9781565120532.

- Marie by Edward Jones
- Charlotte by Tony Earley
- Selling Whiskers by Barbara Hudson
- Spinach by Dan Leone
- Evening by Richard Bausch
- Man Watcher by Jill McCorkle
- Trouble at the Home Office by David Huddle
- Family Planning by Elizabeth Hunnewell
- Helens and Roses by Annette Sanford
- The Waiting Room by Peter Taylor
- Rescuing Ed by Dennis Loy Johnson
- A Jonquil for Mary Penn by Wendell Berry
- Bounty by Pinckney Benedict
- Name Me this River by Kevin Calder
- White Boys and River Girls by Paula K. Gover
- Prisoners by Wayne Karlin
- Preparation by Robert Olen Butler
- Major Six Pockets by Lee Merrill Byrd

New Stories from the South: The Year's Best, 1994. Edited by Shannon Ravenel. ISBN 9781565120884.

- Nicodemus Bluff by Barry Hannah
- My Other Life by Melanie Sumner
- My Mother's Shoes by Robert Love Taylor
- Outlaw Head & Tail by George Singleton
- Pretending the Bed was a Raft by Nanci Kincaid
- Retreat by Frederick Barthelme
- Dark Corner by Robert Morgan
- Landscape and Dream by Nancy Krusoe
- The Palace Thief by Ethan Canin
- The Heart Must from its Breaking by Leon Rooke
- Deeds of Light by Reynolds Price
- Luxury by Kathleen Cushman
- Peeling by John Sayles
- Aren't You Happy for Me? by Richard Bausch
- Sweet Tooth by Pamela Erbe
- The Prophet from Jupiter by Tony Earley

New Stories from the South: The Year's Best, 1995. Edited by Shannon Ravenel. ISBN 9781565121232.

- Water people by James Lee Burke
- Gravity by Susan Perabo
- Bases by Scott Gould
- In the distance by Caroline A. Langston
- Teams by Lynn Marie
- The runaways by Elizabeth Spencer
- The bug man by Tim Gautreaux
- Fixing Lu by M.M.M. Hayes
- The Stucco house by Ellen Gilchrist
- Ladies of the marble hearth by Hillary Hebert
- Riding with the doctor by R. Sebastian Bennett
- Boy born with tattoo of Elvis by Robert Olen Butler
- Everything quiet like church by Dale Ray Phillips
- Paying attention by Ken Craven
- I am the bear by Wendy Brenner
- Drummer down by Barry Hannah
- Gravity by Jesse Lee Kercheval

New Stories from the South: The Year's Best, 1996. Edited by Shannon Ravenel. ISBN 9781565121553.

- Rose of Lebanon by William Faulkner
- Gauguin by Moira Crone
- Paradise by Jill McCorkle
- The host by Marcia Guthridge
- Jealous husband returns in form of parrot by Robert Olen Butler
- Some say the world by Susan Perabo
- Goose girl by Annette Sanford
- The happy memories club by Lee Smith
- A happy, safe thing by Kathy Flann
- The Balm of Gilead tree by Robert Morgan
- Died and gone to Vegas by Tim Gautreaux
- Cool moss by David Gilbert
- General Markman's last stand by Tom Paine
- Mood music by J.D. Dolan
- Grant by Ellen Douglas

Best of the South: From Ten Years of New Stories from the South. 1997. Selected and introduced by Anne Tyler. ISBN 9781565121287.

- Martha Jean by Leon V. Driskell
- After moore by Mary Hood
- Where pelham fell by Bob Shacochis
- Heart by Marly Swick
- Watch by Rick Bass
- Customs of the country by Madison Smartt Bell
- Rain of terror by Frank Manley
- Hank of hair, a piece of bone by Lewis Nordan
- Letter to the lady of the house by Richard Bausch
- Kind of light that shines on Texas by Reginald McKnight
- This is not the picture show by Nanci Kincaid
- Birds for Christmas by Mark Richard
- Intensive care by Lee Smith
- After Memphis by Patricia Lear
- Winnowing of Mrs. Schuping by Padgett Powell
- Charlotte by Tony Earley
- Marie by Edward P. Jones
- Nicodemus bluff by Barry Hannah
- My other life by Melanie Sumner
- Water people by James Lee Burke

New Stories from the South: The Year's Best, 1997. Edited by Shannon Ravenel with a preface by Robert Olen Butler. ISBN 9781565121751.

- Corporal Love by Dale Ray Phillips
- Ramone by Judy Troy
- Help me fine my spaceman lover by Robert Olen Butler
- The taxi ride by Patricia Elam Ruff
- Little frogs in a ditch by Tim Gautreaux
- After the opera by Marc Vassallo
- The Green Suit by Dwight Allen
- Gravity by Pam Durban
- Native daughter by Lee Smith
- Along a wider river by Janice Daugharty
- Ashes north by Edward Allen
- Julia and Nellie by Ellen Douglas
- The finest wife by Elizabeth Gilbert
- Simpler components by Lucy Hochman
- Marrying Aunt Sadie by Gene Able
- Mojo farmer by Brad Vice
- The half-pint by Beauvais McCaddon
- Every building wants to fall by Rhian Margaret Ellis
- Pavane for a dead princess by Charles East

New Stories from the South: The Year's Best, 1998. Edited by Shannon Ravenel with a preface by Padgett Powell. ISBN 9781565122192.

- Yellow Jack by John Russell
- Rita's mystery by John Holman
- Memorial Day by Mark Richard
- The baker's wife by Sara Powers
- The lesson by Frederick Barthelme
- Aliens of affection by Padgett Powell
- Where words go by Michael Gills
- In the Little Hunky River by Annette Sanford
- Girls like you by Jennifer Moses
- The poet by Stephen Dixon
- Nipple by Wendy Brenner
- Sorry blood by Tim Gautreaux
- The other mother by Enid Shomer
- The only way to ride by Molly Best Tinsley
- Bridge by Tony Earley
- The order of things by Nancy Richard
- These people are us by George Singleton
- Naked as Tanya by Stephen Marion
- Talk radio by Scott Ely

New Stories from the South: The Year's Best, 1999. Edited by Shannon Ravenel with a preface by Tony Earley. ISBN 9781565122475.

- Birdland by Michael Knight
- Fla. boys by Heather Sellers
- Lunch at the Piccadilly by Clyde Edgerton
- Those deep elm Brown's ferry blues by William Gay
- Missy by Richard Bausch
- Caulk by George Singleton
- Borrowed hearts by Rick DeMarinis
- The human side of instrumental transcommunication by Wendy Brenner
- Pagan babies by Ingrid Hill
- Leaving Venice, Florida by Richard Schmitt
- Storytelling by Mary Gordon
- Krista had a treble clef rose by Mary Clyde
- Booker T's coming home by Laura Payne Butler
- Beyond the point by Michael Erard
- Miracle boy by Pinckney Benedict
- Neighborhood by Kurt Rheinheimer
- Little bitty pretty one by Andrew Alexander
- Name of love by Janice Daugharty
- Quill by Tony Earley
- Poachers by Tom Franklin

New Stories from the South: The Year's Best, 2000. Edited by Shannon Ravenel with a preface by Ellen Douglas. ISBN 9781565122956.

- A Note to Biographers Regarding Famous Author Flannery O'Connor by Mary Helen Stefaniak
- Sheep by Thomas H. McNeely
- In the Doorway of Rhee's Jazz Joint by D. Winston Brown
- Dancing with the One-Armed Gal by Tim Gautreaux
- Box by A. Manette Ansay
- The Best Friend by Chris Offutt
- Heavy Metal by Robert Olen Butler
- My Hand is Just Fine Where it is by William Gay
- Mr. Puniverse by Wendy Brenner
- The Thing with Willie by Karen Sagstetter
- Good-hearted Woman by Melanie Sumner
- The Widow by Romulus Linney
- He's at the Office by Allan Gurganus
- Wave by John Holman
- Debra's Flap and Snap by Clyde Edgerton
- The Circus House by Cathy Day
- Just Married by Tony Earley
- Rhonda and her Children by Christopher Miner
- Forgetting the End of the World by R.H.W. Dillard
- How to Tell a Story by Margo Rabb

New Stories from the South: The Year's Best, 2001. Edited by Shannon Ravenel with a preface by Lee Smith. ISBN 9781565123113.

- Where what gets into people comes from by Moira Crone
- The Saturday morning car wash club by James Ellis Thomas
- The hero of loneliness by Christie Hodgen
- Make a wish by Elizabeth Tippens
- Jolie-Gray by Ingrid Hill
- Inappropriate babies by Linda Wendling
- I am not like Nuñez by Jane R. Shippen
- Public relations by George Singleton
- The paperhanger by William Gay
- Pink miracle in East Tennessee by Robert Love Taylor
- Jesus is sending you this message by Jim Grimsley
- In between things by Marshall Boswell
- The whimsied world by Nicola Mason
- Two lives by Madison Smartt Bell
- Father judge run by Carrie Brown
- Skin deep by Edith Pearlman
- Shoes by Kurt Rheinheimer
- Hunting country by Stephen Coyne
- The rest of your life by John Barth

New Stories from the South: The Year's Best, 2002. Edited by Shannon Ravenel with a preface by Larry Brown. ISBN 9781565123755.

- Tennessee by Romulus Linney
- End of the steam age by Dwight Allen
- Charting the territories of the red by William Gay
- The unripe heart by Max Steele
- Of falling by Aaron Gwyn
- The rat spoon by Dulane Upshaw Ponder
- Anthropology by Andrea Lee
- Aboveground by Doris Betts
- I have lost my right by R. T. Smith
- Beneath the deep, slow motion by Brad Barkley
- The more they stay the same by Ingrid Hill
- Maximum sunlight by Kate Small
- Show-and-tell by George Singleton
- Pilgrims by Julie Orringer
- Big bend by Bill Roorback
- The Outer Banks by Russell Banks
- The growth and death of Buddy Gardner by Corey Mesler
- The bone divers by David Koon
- Faith healer by Lucia Nevai

New Stories from the South: The Year's Best, 2003. Edited by Shannon Ravenel with a preface by Roy Blount, Jr. ISBN 9781565123953.

- For those of us who need such things by Brock Clarke
- Nirvana by Patricia Lear
- Cool wedding by Latha Viswanathan
- Dying light by Donald Hays
- Inside out by Chris Offutt
- Johnny too bad by John Dufresne
- Rich people by Lucy Corin
- Report from Junction by Brad Vice
- The ballad of Rappy Valcour by Ingrid Hill
- The soul molecule by Steve Almond
- The faithful by Paul Prather
- Ellen's book by Michael Knight
- Every tongue shall confess by ZZ Packer
- Corpus by Brett Anthony Johnston
- Keegan's load by Mark Winegardner
- Off Island by Michael Parker
- Compassion by Dorothy Allison
- Unheard music by Peter Meinke

New Stories from the South: The Year's Best, 2004. Edited by Shannon Ravenel with a preface by Tim Gautreaux. ISBN 9781565124325.

- A rich man by Edward P. Jones
- A family of breast feeders by Starkey Flythe, Jr.
- Second hand by Chris Offutt
- Valor by Ingrid Hill
- Best cousin by Tayari Jones
- Raise children here by George Singleton
- Pagans by Rick Bass
- The judgement of Paris by K.A. Longstreet
- The Lolita School by Brock Clarke
- Coal smoke by Silas House
- Dog song by Ann Pancake
- Love is gnats today by Drew Perry
- Feeling lucky by Michael Knight
- Saturday afternoon in the Holocaust Museum by Elizabeth Seydel Morgan
- One summer by Annette Sanford
- Intervention by Jill McCorkle
- The widow by Bret Anthony Johnston
- Docent by R.T. Smith

New Stories from the South: The Year's Best, 2005. Edited by Shannon Ravenel with a preface by Jill McCorkle. ISBN 9781565124691.

- Hidden meanings : treatment of time, supreme irony, and life experiences in the song "Ain't gonna bump no more no big fat woman" by Michael Parker
- The boucherie by Stephanie Soileau
- Until Gwen by Dennis Lehane
- The kindest cut by Judy Budnitz
- The burning of the flag by James Lee Burke
- Mr. Sender by Moira Crone
- Severance by Robert Olen Butler
- Jane's hat by Cary Holladay
- The dream lover by Lucinda Harrison Coffman
- Nap time by Tom Franklin
- Anything that floats by Bret Anthony Johnston
- Clairvoyant by Ada Long
- The charm of the highway median by Ethan Hauser
- The pantyhose man by Rebecca Soppe
- My heart is a snake farm by Allan Gurganus
- Good witch, bad witch by Gregory Sanders
- The choir director affair (the baby's teeth) by Kevin Wilson
- The boy in the tree by Elizabeth Spencer
- Dumdum by Janice Daugharty

Best of the South: From the Second Decade of New Stories from the South. 2005. Edited by Shannon Ravenel; selected and introduced by Anne Tyler. ISBN 9781565124707.

- The host by Marcia Guthridge
- The Happy Memories Club by Lee Smith
- Ramone by Judy Troy
- Gravity by Pam Durban
- Memorial Day by Mark Richard
- Talk radio by Scott Ely
- Birdland by Michael Knight
- Fla. boys by Heather Sellers
- Those Deep Elm Brown's Ferry blues by William Gay
- Sheep by Thomas H. McNeely
- Debra's flap and snap by Clyde Edgerton
- Jesus is sending you this message by Jim Grimsley
- Hunting country by Stephen Coyne
- The unripe heart by Max Steele
- Faith healer by Lucia Nevai
- The faithful by Paul Prather
- Second hand by Chris Offutt
- Intervention by Jill McCorkle
- Good witch, bad witch by Gregory Sanders
- The boucherie by Stephanie Soileau
- Appendix: New Stories from the South, 1986-2005.

New Stories from the South: The Year's Best, 2006. Edited by Allan Gurganus and Kathy Pories with a preface by Allan Gurganus. ISBN 9781565125315.

- Yard art by Tony Earley
- The burning by Cary Holladay
- Mike by Wendell Berry
- Tunneling to the center of the earth by Kevin Wilson
- Amanuensis by J.D. Chapman
- Money whipped by William Harrison
- Grove by Erin Brooks Worley
- Director's cut by George Singleton
- Kids make their own houses by Geoff Wyss
- Tired Heart by Keith Lee Morris
- The music you never hear by Quinn Dalton
- Blue knights bounced from CVD tourney by Chris Bachelder
- You love that dog by Mary Helen Stefaniak
- Justice by Daniel Wallace
- Fill in the blank by Enid Shomer
- How to build a house by Luke Whisnant
- The currency of love by Nanci Kincaid
- Tastes like chicken by R.T. Smith
- Brief encounters with Che Guevara by Ben Fountain
- Jubilation, Florida by N.M. Kelby

New Stories from the South: The Year's Best, 2007. Edited by Edward P. Jones. ISBN 9781565125568.

- Goats by Rick Bass
- A season of regret by James Lee Burke
- The ice garden by Moira Crone
- Ghost town choir by Joshua Ferris
- The safe by Tim Gautreaux
- Fourteen feet of water in my house by Allan Gurganus
- Hollyhocks by Cary Holladay
- At the Powwow Hotel by Toni Jensen
- Life expectancy by Holly Goddard Jones
- Beauty and virtue by Agustin Maes
- Dogs with human faces by Stephen Marion
- One day this will all be yours by Philipp Meyer
- Jakob Loomis by Jason Ockert
- Which rocks we choose by George Singleton
- Story by R.T. Smith
- Bela Lugosi's dead by Angela Threatt
- A terrible thing by Daniel Wallace
- Unassigned territory by Stephanie Powell Watts

New Stories from the South 2008: The Year's Best. Edited by ZZ Packer and Kathy Pories with an introduction by ZZ Packer. ISBN 9781565126121.

- Theory of realty by Holly Goddard Jones
- Bridge of Sighs by Pinckney Benedict
- The ease of living by Amina Gautier
- First marriage by Kevin Moffett
- The unnecessary man by Robert Drummond
- So this is permanence by Stephanie Soileau
- The great speckled bird by Clyde Edgerton
- Back of beyond by Ron Rash
- Suck it by Merritt Tierce
- Wretch like me by R.T. Smith
- Candidate by Karen E. Bender
- Lizard man by David James Poissant
- The girls by Daniel Wallace
- First husband, first wife by Jim Tomlinson
- Republican by Bret Anthony Johnston
- Leak by Mary Miller
- Albemarle by Charlie Smith
- Child of God by Jennifer Moses
- Lucky seven & Dalloway by Stephanie Dickinson
- Andrea is changing her name by Kevin Brockmeier

New Stories from the South 2009: The Year's Best. Edited by Madison Smartt Bell and Kathy Pories with an introduction by with an introduction by Madison Smartt Bell. ISBN 9781565126749.

- Muscle memory by Katherine Karlin
- Banger finds out by Kelly Cherry
- Touch touch me by Stephen Marion
- Family museum of the ancient postcards by Stephanie Powell Watts
- Child of God by Geoff Wyss
- Coast by Charlotte Holmes
- No joke, this is going to be painful by Kevin Wilson
- The camera obscura by Stephanie Soileau
- Magic words by Jill McCorkle
- Some thing blue by Tayari Jones
- Love city by Stephanie Dickinson
- Grand old party by Michael Knight
- Quarantine by Rahul Mehta
- Sightings by Elizabeth Spencer
- Between wrecks by George Singleton
- The world, the flesh, and the devil by Pinckney Benedict
- Night glow by Holly Wilson
- Bird dog by Clinton J. Stewart
- Horse people by Cary Holladay
- Fly away, breath by Wendell Berry
- The elderberries by Juyanne James

New Stories from the South: The Year's Best, 2010. Edited by Amy Hempel and Kathy Pories with an introduction by Amy Hempel. ISBN 9781565129863.

- New Year's Weekend on the Hand Surgery Ward, Old Pilgrims' Hospital, Naples, Italy by Adam Atlas
- Fish story by Rick Bass
- Noon by Brad Watson
- Someone ought to tell her there's nowhere to go by Danielle Evans
- The ascent by Ron Rash
- Small and heavy world by Ashleigh Pedersen
- A burden by Wendell Berry
- The cow that milked herself by Megan Mayhew Bergman
- Columbarium by George Singleton
- Caiman by Bret Anthony Johnston
- Eraser by Ben Stroud
- Housewarming by Kevin Wilson
- Jason who will be famous by Dorothy Allison
- Arsonists by Ann Pancake
- Drive by Aaron Gwyn
- The green belt by Emily Quinlan
- The coldest night of the twentieth century by Stephen Marion
- Cry for help from France by Padgett Powell
- Nightblooming by Kenneth Calhoun
- Discovered America by Marjorie Kemper
- Return trip by Elizabeth Spencer
- Idols by Tim Gautreaux
- This trembling earth by Laura Lee Smith
- Visitation by Brad Watson
- Retreat by Wells Tower

== Resource ==
- Shannon Ravenel (editor), New Stories from the South, (Chapel Hill: Algonquin Books of Chapel Hill, 2005).
