= Greensboro Review =

American literary magazine

- Discipline: Literary journal
- Language: English
- Edited by: Jim Clark

Publication details
- History: 1969-present
- Publisher: University of North Carolina at Greensboro (United States)
- Frequency: Biannual

Standard abbreviations
- ISO 4: Greensb. Rev.

Indexing
- ISSN: 0017-4084

Links
- Journal homepage

The Greensboro Review, founded in 1966, is one of the nation's oldest literary magazines, based at the University of North Carolina at Greensboro in Greensboro, North Carolina. It publishes fiction and poetry on a semi-annual basis. Work from the journal is featured in such anthologies as New Stories from the South, the O. Henry Prize Stories, and the Best American Short Stories. Founded by poet Robert Watson, the journal was edited for many years by Jim Clark during his tenure as director of the MFA program; it is currently edited by MFA director Terry L. Kennedy. The original design of the magazine was updated in 1989 by then-MFA in Poetry candidate S. P. Donohue, who served as the poetry editor and production manager from 1989–90.

The Review awards the Robert Watson Literary Prizes.

== Notable contributors ==
- Natasha Trethewey
- Claudia Emerson
- George Singleton
- Bret Anthony Johnston
- Viet Dinh
- Jacob M. Appel
- Kelly Cherry
- Kelly Link

== See also ==
- List of literary magazines
