= Fugue (magazine) =

American literary magazine

- Discipline: Literary journal
- Language: English
- Edited by: Keene Short and Ryan Downum

Publication details
- History: 1990-present
- Publisher: University of Idaho (United States)
- Frequency: Biannually

Standard abbreviations
- ISO 4: Fugue

Indexing
- ISSN: 1054-6014

Links
- Journal homepage

Fugue (/fjuːɡ/ fewg) is an American literary magazine based out of the University of Idaho, located in Moscow, Idaho. The journal was founded in 1990 under the editorship of J. C. Hendee.

Publishing biannually, it curates works of fiction, essays, poetry, plays, interviews, and visual-text hybrids. This includes a physical copy (summer-fall) and a digital issue (winter-spring).

In addition to publishing works by established authors, Fugue also accepts work from up-and-coming writers. The journal hosts the Palouse Literary Festival and hosts an annual competition in both poetry and prose.

Notably, in 2018, Fugue published four rediscovered poems and an essay by Anne Sexton, written between 1958 and 1959, originally published in The Christian Science Monitor.

== Notable contributors ==
- Kathy Acker
- Jacob M. Appel
- Samuel R. Delany
- Stephen Dobyns
- Stephen Dunn
- Raymond Federman
- Brenda Hillman
- W.S. Merwin
- Sharon Olds
- James Reiss
- Pattiann Rogers
- Virgil Suarez
- Robert Wrigley
- Charles Baxter

== Honors and awards ==
- Fred Bahnson's essay "Climbing the Sphinx" (issue #30) was reprinted in Best American Spiritual Writing 2007.
- Cary Holladay's story "The Burning" (issue #28) was reprinted in New Stories from the South.
- Floyd Skloot's essay "A Stable State" (issue #29) was selected as a "Notable Essay" in Best American Essays 2005.
- Becky Hagenston's story "Vines" (issue #26) received Special Mention in Pushcart Prize: Best of the Small Presses XXIX.

== See also ==
- List of literary magazines
