= Melanie Sumner =

American novelist

- Born: December 30, 1963 (age 61); Middletown, Ohio, U.S.
- Occupation: writer, college professor
- Education: Darlington School; University of North Carolina at Chapel Hill (BA); Boston University (MFA)
- Notable awards: Whiting Award

Website
- melaniesumner.com

Melanie Sumner (born December 30, 1963) is an American writer and college professor. She was acclaimed as one of "America's Best Young Novelists" in 1995. Writer Jill McCorkle says, "She comes to her characters with this wealth of knowledge. She's so well-versed in those wonderful little details that make up Southern towns. She has such a rich expanse of her fictional turf wildly varied and yet always occupied with this kind of social manners and morals and taboos."

Sumner is an associate professor of English at Kennesaw State University.

== Early life ==
Sumner was born in Middletown, Ohio. When she was seven years old, her family moved to Rome, Georgia where she grew up.

She graduated from Darlington School in 1982. She received a BA in religious studies at the University of North Carolina in 1986. There, she was a member of the literary fraternity St. Anthony Hall. She received an MFA in creative writing at Boston University in 1987.

== Career ==
From 1988 to 1990, Sumner taught English in Senegal with the Peace Corps. She has taught at various colleges, including Cape Fear Community College (1990–1993), the University of North Carolina at Chapel Hill (1995–1996), the University of New Mexico (1998–2001), and Shorter College (2002–2008). Currently, she is an associate professor of English at Kennesaw State University. While at the University of North Carolina at Chapel Hill in 1995 and 1996, she was a writer in residence.

She has published many short stories and several novels. Her short stories have appeared in Atlanta, Harper's Magazine, Ladies Home Journal, The New York Times, The New Yorker, and StoryQuarterly. In 1994, her short story "My Other Life" was selected for inclusion in the anthology New Stories from the South: The Year's Best 1994, published by Algonquin Books. Published in 1995 by Houghton Mifflin, her first book was Polite Society, a novel told through a series of short stories is about a young woman from Tennessee who serves as a Peace Corps volunteer in Senegal.

In her second novel, The School of Beauty and Charm, Sumner portrays an adolescent girl raised in an affluent, Christian-oriented Southern family who struggles under the pressure from her parents to become a “proper young lady," getting involved in alcohol and drugs. It was published in 2002 of Algonquin Books of Chapel Hill, now Simon & Schuster.

Her third novel, The Ghost of Milagro Creek, was published in July 2010 by Algonquin. The ghost of a medicine woman called Abuela narrates this story of star–crossed lovers set in a mixed community of Native Americans, Hispanics, and whites of Taos, New Mexico.

Her fourth novel, How To Write a Novel was published in August 2015 by Vintage, a Random House imprint. Its plot pulls from aspects of Sumner's own life, telling the story of a 12-year-old girl who moves to a small town in Georgia after her father dies with her mother who is an English professor.

== Awards ==
- Polite Society was included in the Library of Congress Peace Corps Collection in 2011
- She received a National Endowment for the Arts Literary Fellowship for prose in 2010.
- In 1995, she received the Whiting Award for fiction for Polite Society.
- She received the Maria Thomas Award for Polite Society, selected as the best book by a returned Peace Corps volunteer.
- She was awarded a fellowship/residency to The Fine Arts Work Center
- She received a fellowship/Residency to Yaddo.
- In 2001, the Rome Area Arts Council in Georgia selected Sumner as the Artist of the Year.
- The Ghost of Milagro Creek was selected as New Mexico's Best Novel

== Publications ==
=== Books ===
==== Short stories ====
- Polite Society. Houghton Mifflin. 1995. ISBN 978-0-395-68998-1.

==== Novels ====
- The School of Beauty and Charm. Algonquin Books of Chapel Hill/Simon & Schuester. 2001. ISBN 978-1-56512-286-4.
- The Ghost of Milagro Creek. Algonquin Books of Chapel Hill. 2010. ISBN 978-1-56512-917-7.
- How to Write a Novel (a novel). Vintage/Random House. 2015. ISBN 978-1101873472.

=== Anthologies ===
- "The Monster," Voices of the Xiled: A Generation Speaks for Itself. Doubleday, 1994. ISBN 978-1-4177-1088-1
- "My Other Life." New Stories from the South: The Year's Best 1994. Algonquin Books, 1994. ISBN 978-1-56512-088-4
- "My Other Life." Best of the South: From Ten Years of New Stories from the South (1997) Algonquin Books. ISBN 978-1-56512-128-7
- "The Guide." Living on the Edge: Fiction by Peace Corps Writers (1999) Curbstone Press. ISBN 978-1-880684-57-3
- "Marriage." Long Story Short: Flash Fiction from 64 of North Carolina's Finest Writers (2009) University of North Carolina Press. ISBN 978-0-8078-5977-3
- "Good-Hearted Woman." New Stories from the South: The Year's Best 2000 (2000) Algonquin Books, p. 37. ISBN 978-1-56512-295-6
- "The Guide." After O'Connor: Stories from Contemporary Georgia (2003) University of Georgia ISBN 978-0-8203-2556-9
- "Marriage." Convergences: Message, Method, Medium. 2nd edition (2004). Bedford / St. Martins. ISBN 978-0-312-25074-4
- "The Monster." The Best of Boulevard Fiction. Volume 1 (2015) Opojaz, Inc.

=== As editor ===
- The Treasure in the Heart: Stories and Yoga for Peaceful Children. with Sydney Soils. (2007) Mythic Yoga Studio. ISBN 978-0-9777063-1-0

=== Journals. ===
- "Yesterday." StoryQuarterly (1987)
- "The Night Watchman." The Kennesaw Review (1988)
- "Naar," Story (1991)
- "Monster" Boulevard (1992)
- "My Other Life." StoryQuarterly (1993)
- "The Edge of the Sky." The New Yorker, (February 1, 1993) p. 74.
- "The Guide." The New Yorker (April 26, 1993) p. 84.
- "The Bad Connection." Seventeen (1994)
- "Up in Smoke." Conde Nast Sports for Women (1998)
- "The School of Beauty and Charm." Story (1998)
- "Good Hearted Woman." Doublelake (1999)
- "Out of Alaska." The New York Times (1999)
- "Slipping Away." Ladies Home Journal (2002)
- "Marriage." Harper's Magazine (2003)
- "The Willing Suspension of Disbelief." Atlanta (2004)
- "Killing the Cat." Tri-Quarterly (2004)
- "Old Money, New Money, and No Money," Atlanta (2006)
- "Wildwood," Atlanta (2007)
- "Emergence." Five Points Magazine (2008)

== Personal life ==
Sumner spent some twenty years as "a Southern expatriate downplaying her accent and poking fun at her roots." She has lived in Senegal, New Mexico, Alaska, and Provincetown. Around 2001, she moved back to Rome, Georgia due to an illness in her family. Her husband David died from Lou Gehrig's Disease in 2002. She has two children, Zoë and Rider.
