= Polite society =

Polite society may refer to:

- The upper class (a euphemism)
- Polite society, the etiquette and manners of the upper class
- Polite Society, a 1995 novel by Melanie Sumner, winner of that year's Whiting Writers' Award
- Polite Society (film), a British 2023 action comedy film
