= Pinckney Benedict =

American short-story writer and novelist

- Born: 1964 (age 61–62); Greenbrier County, West Virginia, U.S.
- Education: Princeton University, University of Iowa (Iowa Writers' Workshop)
- Occupations: Writer, professor
- Spouse: Laura Benedict
- Writing career
- Genres: Fiction, short stories

Pinckney Benedict (born 1964) is an American short-story writer and novelist whose work often reflects his Appalachian background.

== Biography ==
Benedict was raised in Greenbrier County, West Virginia, where his family had a dairy farm. He attended The Hill School in Pottstown, Pennsylvania, and graduated from Princeton University, where he studied primarily with Joyce Carol Oates, in 1986, and from the Iowa Writers’ Workshop at the University of Iowa in 1988.

He has published three collections of short fiction (Town Smokes, The Wrecking Yard, and Miracle Boy) and a novel (Dogs of God).

His stories have appeared in publications including Esquire, Zoetrope: All-Story, StoryQuarterly, Ontario Review, Appalachian Heritage, the O. Henry Award series, the New Stories from the South series and the Pushcart Prize series.

Along with his wife, the novelist Laura Benedict (Isabella Moon, and Calling Mr. Lonelyhearts), he edits the biennial Surreal South fiction anthology series (Press 53). The third volume of the series, Surreal South '11, was published in October 2011.

He wrote the screenplay for the feature film Four Days, which starred Kevin Zegers, Colm Meaney, Lolita Davidovich, and William Forsythe.

He serves on the core faculty of the low-residency MFA program at Queens University of Charlotte in North Carolina. He has served on the writing faculties of Oberlin College, Princeton University, and Hollins University, as a McGhee Writing Fellow at Davidson College in Davidson, North Carolina, and as a Thurber House Fellow at the Ohio State University.

He is currently full professor in the English Department at Southern Illinois University Carbondale.

== Published works ==
- Town Smokes (short stories), 1987
- The Wrecking Yard (short stories), 1992
- Dogs of God (novel), 1995
- Surreal South (edited anthology, with Laura Benedict), 2007
- Surreal South '09 (edited anthology, with Laura Benedict), 2009
- Surreal South '11 (edited anthology, with Laura Benedict), 2011
- Miracle Boy and Other Stories, Press 53, 2010

== Awards ==
He is the recipient, among other prizes, of a Literature Fellowship from the National Endowment for the Arts, a fiction grant from the Illinois Arts Council, a Literary Fellowship from the West Virginia Commission on the Arts, a Michener Fellowship from the Iowa Writers' Workshop, the Chicago Tribune's Nelson Algren Award, and Britain's Steinbeck Award.
