= Appalachian Review =

American literary magazine

- Fall 2021 cover
- Editor: Jason Kyle Howard
- Former editors: Albert Stewart, Sidney Saylor Farr, Jim Gage, George Brosi
- Categories: Literary magazine
- Frequency: Quarterly
- Founder: Albert Stewart
- Founded: 1973
- Company: University of North Carolina Press for Berea College
- Country: United States
- Based in: Chapel Hill, North Carolina
- Website: www.appalachianreview.net
- ISSN: 0363-2318

Appalachian Review, formerly known as Appalachian Heritage, is a literary quarterly that "showcases the work of emerging and established writers throughout Appalachia and beyond."

Notable writers who have contributed to Appalachian Review include Harriette Simpson Arnow, Pinckney Benedict, Wendell Berry, Wiley Cash, Nikki Giovanni, bell hooks, Silas House, Fenton Johnson, Barbara Kingsolver, Maurice Manning, Jim Wayne Miller, Robert Morgan, Ann Pancake, Jayne Anne Phillips, Ron Rash, Lee Smith, James Still, Lyrae Van Clief-Stefanon, Neela Vaswani, Frank X Walker and Crystal Wilkinson.

== History and publication ==
Appalachian Review was founded in 1973 as Appalachian Heritage by mountain poet Albert Stewart at Alice Lloyd College. The magazine moved to the Hindman Settlement School in 1982. Berea College began sponsoring the magazine in 1985. It publishes fiction, creative nonfiction, poetry, craft essays, interviews, book reviews, and visual art. Material from the magazine has been widely anthologized in collections including New Stories from the South. Journal contributors include multiple Pushcart Prize nominees; recipients of the T. S. Eliot Prize, the E. B. White Award, and an O. Henry Prize; a National Book Award finalist; and a Pulitzer Prize finalist.

From 2002 to 2012, each issue of the magazine focused on one author from the region, along with original work from other writers. Featured authors included Cormac McCarthy, Silas House, Crystal Wilkinson, Emma Bell Miles, Harriette Simpson Arnow, Ron Rash, Wilma Dykeman, Thomas Wolfe and Karen Salyer McElmurray, among others, as well as special issues dedicated to African-American Appalachian writers and Eastern Band of the Cherokee members.

Creative nonfiction writer and editor Jason Kyle Howard assumed editorship of Appalachian Review in November 2013. Since then, the magazine has focused on showcasing the original work of both emerging and established writers throughout Appalachia and beyond. In an interview upon being named editor, Howard said, "I'm looking forward to preserving the legacy of the magazine's past editors, while also taking it to new places."
