= Karen Salyer McElmurray =

American writer

- Born: September 12, 1956 (age 69); Topeka, Kansas, United States
- Occupation: Writer
- Writing career
- Genres: Creative nonfiction, Literary Fiction, Memoir
- Notable work: Surrendered Child: A Birth Mother's Journey
- Website: www.karenmcelmurray.com

Karen Salyer McElmurray (born September 12, 1956) is an American writer of creative nonfiction and literary fiction. Her works include Wanting Radiance (University Press of Kentucky, 2020), The Motel of the Stars: A Novel (Sarabande Books, 2008), Surrendered Child: A Birth Mother’s Journey (University of Georgia Press, 2006), and Strange Birds in the Tree of Heaven (University of Georgia Press, 2004), as well as numerous essays and short stories. McElmurray was Editor’s Pick by Oxford American in November 2009. She was the recipient of the AWP Award for Creative Nonfiction (2003), and the Lillie Chaffin Award for Appalachian Writing (2001).

== Personal life ==
Karen Salyer McElmurray was born September 12, 1956, in Topeka, Kansas, and grew up in eastern Kentucky with a difficult childhood. Her mother suffered depression, and McElmurray moved around between a few new towns as her father tried to settle into a new job with the state education department. During her summers, she spent time with her paternal grandmother, and shared a love of words with her childhood best friend. They wrote poems together, igniting McElmurray's love of writing. At fourteen, her parents separated and McElmurray stayed with her father. Two years later, she became pregnant and gained all the life experience necessary for her to later pen her book Surrendered Child: A Birth Mother’s Journey, her award-winning memoir about the birth and closed-adoption of her son.

== Education ==
- Ph.D. in American Literature from the University of Georgia in 1997
- M.A. in English/Writing from Hollins University in 1989
- MFA in Fiction from the University of Virginia in 1986
- B.A. in Philosophy and Literature from Berea College in 1980

== Professional and teaching experience ==
McElmurray has served at numerous colleges and universities as an instructor, professor, and writer-in-residence. She has won faculty awards from Lynchburg College, and was named a Distinguished Alumni from Berea College. McElmurray has also worked as editor of multiple literary magazines like Arts & Letters and Prisim. She most recently served as writer-in-residence for Hollins University.

== Works ==
=== Books ===
- Walk till the Dogs Get Mean: Appalachian Writers Break the Silence: Essays, co-edited with Adrian Blevins. Forthcoming, Ohio University Press, Fall 2015
- The Motel of the Stars: A Novel. Sarabande Books, 2008
- Surrendered Child: A Birth Mother’s Journey. University of Georgia Press, 2006
- Strange Birds in the Tree of Heaven. University of Georgia Press, 2004
- Wanting Inez: A Novel. Manuscript under revision.

=== Additional publications ===
- “Elixir,” The South Dakota Review, Fall 2015
- “Driven,” Women and Their Machines, Forthcoming, University of Michigan Press
- “Looking Inside,” Appalachian Heritage, Spring 2014
- “The Land Between,” Revolution House, Spring 2014
- “Strange Tongues,” winner of Annie Dillard Award, The Bellingham Review, Spring 2014
- “Saved,” essay chosen for Best of the Net, 2014
- “Outside the Outside,” Drafthorse, Winter 2013
- “Between,” Family Trouble, October 2013
- “That Night,” Red Holler, October 2013
- “Hurricane,” Riverteeth, Fall, 2012
- “The Red Sari,” Shaking, December 2011
- “At the Rock House Church,” Iron Horse, (Special State of Fiction Issue) Spring 2011
- “Hands,” The Superstition Review, Spring 2011
- “Coming Clean,” The Louisville Review, Spring 2010
- “Once,” in Chances, Motes Books, March 2010
- “Teaching Rapture,” Still: Writing from the Mountain South, October 2009
- “What We Remember, What We Forget,” in To Tell the Truth: Practice and Craft in Narrative Nonfiction, Addison-Wesley, September 2008
- “Trip Around the World,” in An Angle of Vision, University of Michigan Press, December 2009
- “Clutter,” in Dirt, Seal Press, April 2009
- “Gazing: Writing from the Womb,” in Fearless Confessions, University of Georgia Press, May 2009
- “My Mother, Breathing,” in We All Live Downstream, Motes Press
- “Reliquaries, Blue Mesa, Spring 2003
- “June 21, 1973,” Turnings: Transformations in Women’s Lives, Spring 2000
- “Minimalism and Maximalism in the Creative Writing Classroom,” Creating Fiction, Story Press, March 1999
- “Running Away,” The Sun, Winter 1994
- “The Logic of Angels,” The Alaska Quarterly Review, Spring/Summer 1992
- “The Lost Art of Tap Dancing,” The Kenyon Review, Spring/Summer 1992
- “A Royal House,” West Branch, Spring 1990
- “City of Spires, City of Dreams,” The Key West Review, Fall 1989
- “Jeanette: Refractions of Water and Light,” Cargoes, Spring 1989
- “The Tattoo,” Timbuktu, Fall 1988
- “Waiting for the Animals,” The Pikeville Review, Spring 1987
- “Other Fires: A Book Review,” Iris, Fall 1987
- “Fetching Water,” Iris, Spring 1987

== Awards ==
- Emory and Henry College, Fall Conference Honoree, 2014
- Annie Dillard Award for the Essay, The Bellingham Review, Fall 2013
- Distinguished Alumni Award, Berea College, 2013
- Lit Life. Novel of the Year, for The Motel of the Stars. January 2009
- Nominee, Weatherford Award for Fiction, for The Motel of the Stars, January 2009
- Editor’s Pick, Oxford American, November 2009.
- Linda Bruckheimer Series in Fiction, Sarabande Books, 2007
- Georgia Author of the Year Award (Memoir), for Surrendered Child: A Birth Mother's Journey, 2005
- Appalachian Book of the Year, for Surrendered Child: A Birth Mother's Journey, Appalachian Writers Association, 2005
- Finalist, Shenandoah Glasgow Prize for Emerging Writers, 2005
- National Book Critics Circle, Notable Book, for Surrendered Child: A Birth Mother's Journey, Winter 2005
- Kentucky Educational Television Book Club Selection, for Strange Birds in the Tree of Heaven, June 2005
- Association of Writers and Writing Programs, Award in Creative Nonfiction, 2003
- Lillie Chaffin Award for Appalachian Literature, Morehead State University, 2001
- Nominee, Shirley Rosser Excellence in Teaching Award, Lynchburg College, Spring 2001
- Nominee, Pushcart Prize, for “June 23, 1973,” May 2001
- Nominee, Lillian Anne Smith Award for Best Novel, 2001
- Nominee, Virginia Prize for Fiction, Summer 2000
- James A. Huston Excellence in Scholarship Award, Lynchburg College, 2000
- Nominee, Appalachian Book of the Year, Appalachian Writers Association, 1999
- Finalist, AWP Award Series, Association of Writers and Writing Programs, 1998
- Finalist, Writing Fellowship, Provincetown Fine Arts Work Center, 1995, 1993
- Nominee, Pushcart Prize, for “The Logic of Angels,” 1994
- Literature Fellowship, National Endowment for the Arts, 1993
- Nominee, Sherwood Anderson Award for Short Fiction, 1989
- James Purdy Prize for Fiction, 1989
