= John Bensko =

American poet

- Born: Birmingham, Alabama
- Education: Florida State University
- Occupations: American poet, professor
- Spouse: Cary Holladay
- Writing career
- Language: English
- Notable awards: Yale Series of Younger Poets (1981)
- Literary movement: 20th century poetry

John Bensko is an American poet who won the Yale Series of Younger Poets in 1981; he taught in the MFA program at the University of Memphis, along with his wife, the fiction writer Cary Holladay.

== Career ==
Bensko has an MFA in creative writing from The University of Alabama (1979) and a Ph.D. in 20th-century poetry and narrative technique from Florida State University (1985). He was a student of Thomas Rabbitt in poetry and Barry Hannah in fiction, and classmate of Clark Powell:

Our weekly workshops were simple - take the latest purple mimeographed worksheet of student's poems, and have everyone critique the poems. I once wrote a four-line poem that had an epigraph from Moby Dick that was almost an entire paragraph. I read the poem. Silence. Then everybody started laughing. It was that bad. Another student named John Bensko made a comment that broke everybody up: "This poem is a bit top-heavy."

Before coming to the University of Memphis, he taught at The University of Alabama, Old Dominion University, Rhodes College, and, as a Fulbright Professor in American Literature, at the University of Alicante, Spain. He has been the Coordinator of the MFA program at the University of Memphis and was Director of the River City Writers Series for the 2005–2006 season. Through the U of M Study Abroad Office, he launched a summer creative writing program at the University of Alicante, Spain.

His work has appeared in Georgia Review, Iowa Review, New England Review, New Letters, Poetry, Poetry Northwest, AGNI, Critical Quarterly, The Southern Review, The Southern Poetry Review, Shenandoah, Chelsea, OnEarth, Epoch, The Gettysburg Review, TriQuarterly, Poet Lore, The Journal, Prairie Schooner, and many other periodicals.

== Personal life and family ==
A former resident of Memphis along with his Virginia-born wife Cary Holladay, John Bensko was born in Birmingham, Alabama. He is the son of John Bensko Jr., in turn the son of John (longtime mayor of Brookside, Alabama) and Julia Bensko; other relatives include uncle Robert Ray Bensko Sr. (1936–2012) and cousins Robert Ray Bensko Jr., Kristy Bensko, and Jennifer Bensko Ha.

== Awards ==
- Yale Series of Younger Poetry Award for 1981 (selected by Richard Hugo)
- McLeod-Grobe Poetry Prize for 2000
- Anita Claire Scharf Prize for 2013

== Selected works ==
- The Wild Horses of Asseateague Island, Poetry, May 1983
- The Lost Watch, The Kenyon Review, Winter 2004, Volume XXVI Number 1
- Union Sniper, Poetry Southeast, Spring 2006
- Persimmon, Chelsea, Verse Daily 2006
- Blind Sight, AGNI online, August 2007
- Revenge of the Weeds: Talking with Poet John Bensko, OnEarth podcast, June 25, 2008
- Bensko, John (2008). "Wooden Floor, and: Our Side of the Tracks". Prairie Schooner. 82 (1): 41–43. doi:10.1353/psg.0.0014. S2CID 72346913. Project MUSE 237432.
- Dawn, Ploughshares, Winter 2006-7

=== Books ===
- Visitations. University of Tampa Press. 2014. ISBN 978-159732-116-7.
- Sea Dog Stories. Graywolf Press. May 1, 2004. ISBN 978-1-55597-399-5.
- The Iron City. University of Illinois Press. May 19, 2000. ISBN 978-0-252-06871-3.
- The Waterman's Children. University of Massachusetts Press. 1994. ISBN 978-0-87023-902-1.
- Green Soldiers. Yale University Press. March 1981. ISBN 978-0-300-02644-3.

=== Anthologies ===
- Leon Stokesbury (1999). The made thing: an anthology of contemporary Southern poetry. University of Arkansas Press. p. 28. ISBN 978-1-55728-579-9.
- Cary Nelson (2002). The Wound and the Dream. University of Illinois Press. ISBN 978-0-252-07070-9.

== See also ==
- American poetry
