= Kate Small =

American writer

Kate Small is an American writer. Her work has appeared in The Boston Review, Nimrod, The Madison Review and elsewhere.

Stories by Small have been reprinted in Best New American Voices and New Stories From the South.

She earned her MFA in creative writing from San Francisco State University and lives in Friday Harbor, Washington, where she teaches humanities at the Spring Street International School.

== Books ==
The Gap in the Letter C: Stories (Fourteen Hills Press, 1999)
