= Lucy Corin =

American writer

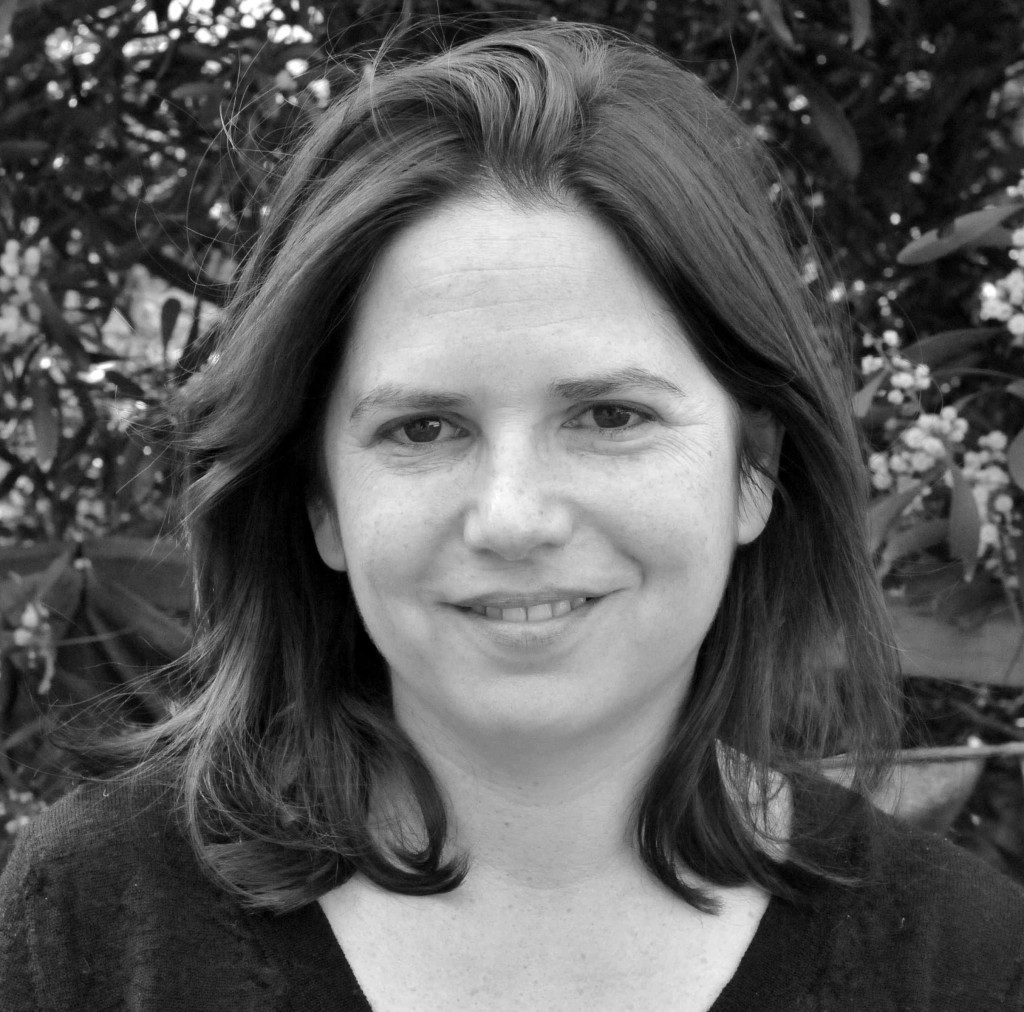
- Born: Chicago, Illinois, U.S.
- Education: Duke University; Brown University
- Occupation: Novelist
- Writing career
- Period: 1988–present
- Genres: Literary fiction, Avant-garde fiction
- Notable awards: Guggenheim (2023); Creative Writing Fellowship, National Endowment for the Arts (2015); Rome Prize, (2012)
- Website: www.lucycorin.com

Lucy Corin is an American novelist and short story writer. The winner of the 2012 American Academy of Arts and Letters John Guare Writer's Fund Rome Prize, Corin was awarded a Guggenheim Fellowship in 2023 and a National Endowment for the Arts creative writing fellowship in 2015.

== Writing ==
Her collection of short stories, One Hundred Apocalypses and Other Apocalypses, was published by McSweeney's in 2013. Bustle wrote: "Corin caters to our fascination with neuroses and habits, and by exaggerating aspects of our thought processes and societal quirks, she leaves us thinking deeply about parts of humanity we don't often examine under a magnifying glass." A review by Jonathan Deuel in the Los Angeles Review of Books read: "The dreamy, fairy-tale qualities and allegorical ambitions of these stories are tempered with sophistication and terror, making One Hundred Apocalypses and Other Apocalypses ageless...I'm frightened by Corin. I'm dazzled by her writing."

Corin's second novel, The Swank Hotel, (2021) explores madness, generational trauma, and cultural breakdown. An early review in Publishers Weekly noted her "limber voice" and stated that The Swank Hotel "brims with genuine depth and humor."

Corin's stories have appeared in The Mid-American Review, Conjunctions, Tin House, Ploughshares, PEN America, and the Iowa Review. She is anthologized in the 1994 Iowa Anthology of Innovative Fiction and both the 1997 and 2003 editions of New Stories From the South and "Madmen," originally published in One Hundred Apocalypses, was included in the 2015 anthology, New American Stories, edited by Ben Marcus. Her novel, Everyday Psychokillers: A History for Girls was published in 2004 by FC2. Her short story collection, The Entire Predicament was published in 2007 by Tin House Books.

She is the program director for the University of California, Davis Creative Writing Program.

== Selected awards and recognition ==
- Guggenheim Fellowship, 2023
- National Endowment for the Arts, Creative writing fellowship, 2015
- American Academy of Arts and Letters John Guare Writer's Fund Rome Prize, 2012
- Yaddo Residency, 2010
- Margaret Bridgman Fellow in Fiction, Bread Loaf Writers’ Conference, 2008
- Walter E. Dakin Fellow, Sewanee Writers’ Conference, 2006

== Bibliography ==
- The Swank Hotel, Graywolf, 2021 ISBN 978-1-64445-066-6
- 100 Apocalypses and Other Apocalypses (short story collection) McSweeney's, September 2013 ISBN 9781938073335
- The Entire Predicament (short story collection) Portland, OR: Tin House Books. 2007 ISBN 978-0-9776989-8-1
- Everyday Psychokillers: A History for Girls Tallahassee: FC2. 2004 ISBN 1-57366-112-0
