= Maria Thomas =

American writer (1941–1989)

- Born: Roberta Thomas; July 6, 1941; Camden, New Jersey
- Died: August 7, 1989 (aged 48); 16 miles southeast of Dembidolo, Ethiopia
- Education: Mount Holyoke College (BA); Pennsylvania State University (MA)
- Occupation: Writer
- Spouse: Tom Worrick
- Children: Raphael Worrick
- Writing career
- Pen name: Maria Thomas
- Years active: 1975-1989
- Notable works: Antonia Saw the Oryx First (1987); Come to Africa and Save Your Marriage (1987); African Visas (1991)

Roberta Worrick (born Roberta Thomas; July 6, 1941 – August 7, 1989), better known by her pen name Maria Thomas, was an American writer who published a novel, short stories, and essays. Much of her writing was set in, or was about, various countries in Africa, where she lived and worked for most of her professional life. Her writing earned numerous awards and widespread critical praise. Her death at age 48, (Note: The birth date in the author bio in African Visas confirms those sources that say she was 48 years old at the time of her death, although other sources say she was 47.) in a plane crash in Ethiopia, cut short a successful and promising literary career.

== Life and career ==
=== Early years, 1941-1971 ===
Born in Camden, New Jersey, a daughter of Robert R. and Aida Thomas, she later wrote that her "family moved quite a bit in the early years of my life." Roberta Thomas grew up in Ohio and in Massachusetts, where she met her future husband in elementary school. She earned a B.A. from Mount Holyoke College, graduating in 1963.

After college, Roberta Thomas studied painting in Florence, Italy, for a year, and then married Tom Worrick, an agricultural economist, taking his last name. They lived in Vermont for two years, where she taught English (she said that she also taught math and art) at the Mountain School in Vershire and gave birth to their son, Raphael Worrick. From Vermont their family moved to Las Cruces, New Mexico, where she taught English at New Mexico State University, and then to Pennsylvania, where Roberta and Tom Worrick enrolled in graduate school at Pennsylvania State University. Roberta earned an M.A. in English there. Her Penn State classes included a 1971 Comparative Literature seminar taught by the novelist Paul West, who became a lifelong mentor and correspondent, and later published a eulogy for her.

=== Life and work in African countries (mostly), 1971-1989 ===
Worrick and her husband applied to the Peace Corps because jobs in the United States were unavailable in his field at that time. They hoped to be assigned to Latin America since they spoke Spanish, having learned it while living in New Mexico and traveling to Mexico. Instead they were sent to Africa, which became their home and professional focus for most of the rest of their lives. They served as Peace Corps Volunteers in Ethiopia from 1971 to 1973, moving there with their four-year-old son. (They served as a family with a child, something not possible before or since then, under a short-lived Peace Corps program that recruited married couples with children.) Roberta Worrick's Peace Corps job was, she said, to be "a technical writer for the dairy development agency in Addis Ababa," seeking to modernize Ethiopia's dairy industry. She worked on a textbook for agricultural extension agents and farmers. (Her son says that she taught English; she could have done both.)

After Peace Corps, Tom Worrick began work with USAID as an agricultural economist. Between then and 1989, he was posted to, and the family lived in, Nigeria, Tanzania, Pakistan (from which the family was evacuated to Washington after the November 1979 attack on the U.S. Embassy in Islamabad), Kenya, Liberia, and Ethiopia, as well as Washington, D.C. between some overseas postings. (She also was awarded a 1986-87 Stegner Fellowship, which requires recipients to live near the Stanford campus for its two-year duration.) In their last posting, in Ethiopia, Roberta worked in relief and development, including as a "contract Emergency Food Program monitor for USAID Ethiopia," traveling through the country "supervising emergency relief and refugee assistance," and utilizing her fluency in Amharic, one of several African languages that she spoke.

=== Writing ===
In addition to her relief and development work, Roberta Worrick wrote fiction under her chosen pen name, Maria Thomas. It took about fifteen years of having stories published in prestigious but small journals, with multiple stories in each of The North American Review, StoryQuarterly, The Antioch Review, and Chicago Review, for example, and in more popular outlets including Redbook, before she found a publisher. Although Maria Thomas was not widely known outside of literary circles before 1987, she won several awards during that time for her fiction—from Chicago Review and StoryQuarterly, and the 1981 National Magazine Award for fiction to The North American Review for three stories, one of them hers.

Eventually, her book manuscripts were accepted by Soho Press, described by Lee Lescaze in The Wall Street Journal as "the small publisher that published Ms. Thomas when others wouldn't." Describing this turning point of her career, he wrote, "In 1987, she published (after years of publishers' rejections) two brilliant books."

Richard Lipez aptly described Maria Thomas' literary career as "late-blooming," since she did not publish a book until she was about 45 years old. Marianne Wiggins wrote in The New York Times Book Review that Thomas' "initial" work showed "sureness and polish, . . . as if waiting all those years to write, until her middle age, had given this author a special advantage." This perception that Thomas became a writer only relatively late in life seems contrary to the fact that Thomas spent years writing fiction before her books were published in 1987. Wiggins' view contrasts, for example, with her son's statement that, "She actually wrote for many, many years with very little recognition. . . . I think it was around 15 years from when she started submitting material until she secured a publisher." The Wall Street Journal's above-quoted description of "years" of rejections makes the same point, as does an author description in Chicago Review that said, "Maria Thomas, painter and writer, is working on a collection of short stories and a novel set in Africa"—and was written in 1978, nine years before those two books saw print.

==== Antonia Saw the Oryx First ====
In 1987, Maria Thomas published a novel set in Tanzania, Antonia Saw the Oryx First, (she disliked that title, and wanted the book to be called African Visas) which received widespread critical acclaim. Margaret Atwood called it "a complex, deeply written and finely wrought double portrait of two women, one black, one white, picking their way through the debris of a shattered colonialism, discovering unexpected treasures buried in the rubble." USA Today called it "the year's best novel." Richard Eder, in the L.A. Times, described it as "a beautiful, sometimes difficult first novel about the deepening affinity between a white woman doctor and a black woman 'healer' in East Africa" and "a work of astonishing energy and vision." Michael Gorra, reviewing it for The New York Times Book Review, wrote, "Ms. Thomas's story of the relationship between the women provides a complex account of the one between Africa and the West. She is a fine painter of scenes." Kirkus Reviews called it an "unfailingly intelligent first novel about the enigma that is modern Africa." It also received highly positive reviews in other newspapers including the Fort Worth Star-Telegram, the Philadelphia Inquirer, and the Cleveland Plain Dealer.

==== Come to Africa and Save Your Marriage ====
Later in 1987, Maria Thomas published a book of short stories, Come to Africa and Save Your Marriage, and Other Stories. Describing her reason for writing these stories, many of them about Americans in Africa who experience cross-cultural misunderstandings, she told a New York Times interviewer, "I realized that there were a lot of stories about Americans living in Africa that were not being told," and that her stories convey how "there really are a bunch of us out here, doing of all kinds of different things. There's still a Peace Corps, there are technocrats, there are embassy employees, there are teachers." Publishers Weekly called it "a collection of enormous emotional impact." Barbara Thompson, in The New York Times Book Review, wrote that the book "in its best stories is not about a failure of communication between cultures or about crises in the modern African state, but about the loss of contact with our own souls." Susan Heeger wrote in the Los Angeles Times that Thomas "believes in the power of narrative to reconcile contradictions and make mysteries comprehensible. Her 14 stories make a luminous case for her position." Alix Madrigal wrote in The San Francisco Chronicle, "Thomas' writing is so dazzling that it all but obscures the flaws." Come to Africa and Save Your Marriage received positive reviews in other outlets including the Hartford Courant, the Baltimore Sun, Newsday, and the (Raleigh) News and Observer.

Those two books would be the only ones published during her lifetime.

=== Death ===
Roberta Worrick was one of 16 (Note: Some sources give the number killed in the crash as 10 or 14, but those saying 16 seem more authoritative. Some of the difference is explained by a New York Times story that says there were nine Americans onboard, and the plane's manifest listed five Ethiopians but later reports indicated that seven Ethiopians were onboard.) people, including her husband and Congressman Mickey Leland, killed in a plane crash in Ethiopia on August 7, 1989. The De Havilland Twin Otter in which they were flying crashed into a mountain, 300 feet below its peak, in dense fog. The wreckage, at a site 16 miles southeast of Dembidolo, was not found (despite extensive search efforts) until a week later, on August 14. There were no survivors. The group was traveling to inspect the Fugnido refugee camp, near Ethiopia's border with Sudan. Tom Worrick was accompanying Representative Leland as Deputy Director of USAID's mission in Ethiopia, and Roberta was working as a translator.

== Posthumous assessments, commemoration, and publication ==
After her death, many commentators recognized her exceptional talent and the loss to literature. For example, Patricia Holt wrote in the San Francisco Chronicle, "Maria Thomas was a rare and extraordinary talent whose art will continue to inform and open up the world. . . . One great tragedy of Thomas' death is the loss of her promise. Her most accomplished and mature writing was still to come." Janet Lee wrote of "a profound sense of loss, the loss of what could have been." Paul West simply wrote, "We were robbed."

=== Maria Thomas Fiction Award ===
An award for fiction was established in her honor by the organization Peace Corps Worldwide (formerly Peace Corps Writers), which has awarded it annually since 1990. Its winners include Paul Theroux, Norman Rush, Bob Shacochis, and Richard Wiley.

=== African Visas ===
In 1991, Soho Press published a posthumous collection of Maria Thomas' work under the title that she wanted to use for her previous novel: African Visas. It contained a novella, "The Jiru Road," which she had sent to her agent in 1981 but her agent had been unable to publish, and six stories, mostly from manuscripts found in her papers. The thumbnail sketch of African Visas in the New York Times Book Review's list of notable books of 1991 described it as "Funny, poignant, incisive, sexy, polished and enlightening fiction that makes wise use of its author's life in Africa." Reviewing it in the New York Times Book Review, Marianne Wiggins ranked Thomas "in many ways as brilliant as" Isak Dinesen, Rebecca West, Gertrude Stein, Edith Wharton, and Ernest Hemingway. African Visas also received positive reviews, many also expressing sadness for the abrupt end to her life and career, from the St. Louis Post-Dispatch, the San Francisco Chronicle, the Richmond Times-Dispatch, the Arizona Daily Star, the Hartford Courant, the St. Petersburg Times, the Wall Street Journal, the Christian Science Monitor, the Orlando Sentinel, the Antioch Review, the Albuquerque Journal, the Tampa Bay Times, the Miami Herald, and the Anderson Independent-Mail. Richard Lipez in the Washington Post, by contrast, while offering high praise for her literary talent, criticized the collection of stories as not up to that level of talent, calling it "an odd mixed bag" and saying "It's hard to know if Thomas ever meant for the unpublished work here to see the light of day, and her publisher offers no clue." Lipez later added, reacting to the publisher's letter responding to his review, "less than half the material in this ill-conceived memorial is anywhere near the standard readers had come to expect from this extraordinarily gifted writer."

Discussing African Visas with Liane Hansen on NPR in 1991, Roberta Worrick's son agreed that she took a cynical view of Western foreign aid to African countries. But, he added, "One thing I find odd about a lot of the reviews of my mother's work is that people seem to think that she has a negative view of Africa. And of course, nothing could be further from the truth. All of us loved Africa and loved the people and felt very close to the people and the culture. But I think what gives people that misconception is the fact that, unlike some of the earlier romantic writers about Africa, my mother understood that we were appreciating something that we couldn't—really never—be part of."

== Future publication ==
Paul West wrote in December 1989 that he would like to see her letters posthumously published, quoting several of her letters to him: "The best eulogy in the world, enmeshing her in the future even more firmly, would be to have her sparkling letters collected up, together with any unpublished fiction." Lee Lescaze wrote that her publisher promised to publish additional work of hers after African Visas: "Soho Press promises there will be even more." To date, no letters or additional stories from Maria Thomas have been published.

== Awards and honors ==
- StoryQuarterly Fiction Prize
- Chicago Review annual Fiction award ($100, for best work of fiction it published in the previous year), Spring 1976, for "Carolyn's House"
- National Magazine Award for Fiction, 1981, to the North American Review for three stories by three writers, including "Summer Opportunity"
- Stegner Fellowship at Stanford, 1986-87
- Overseas Press Awards for 1987, Class 10, The Hallie and Whit Burnett Award for Best Magazine Article on Foreign Affairs, Citation [like runner-up], for "A State of Permanent Revolution: Ethiopia Bleeds Red," in Harper's

== Publications ==
=== Books ===
- Antonia Saw the Oryx First (novel, Soho Press, 1987, reprinted 2007 with introduction by George Packer)
- Come to Africa and Save Your Marriage, and Other Stories (stories, Soho Press, 1987, reprinted 2003)
- African Visas (novella and stories, Soho Press, 1991, reprinted 2007)

=== Stories and articles (partial list) ===
- "Carolyn's House," Chicago Review, vol. 27, no. 1 (Summer 1975).
- "Slipping Out of Her Body," Chicago Review, vol. 30, no. 2 (Autumn 1978).
- "Trying to Hide," Antioch Review, vol. 37, no. 4 (Autumn 1979).
- "The Girl Who Is Living with Carl," Chelsea 38 (November 1979)
- "Missing Dates: Islamabad Remembered," The North American Review, Vol. 265, No. 1 (Spring 1980).
- "Summer Opportunity," The North American Review, Vol. 265, No. 4 (Dec. 1980).
- "Creatures of the Deep," Redbook (February 1982).
- "Silver Sugar from Bombay," The North American Review, Vol. 268, No. 1 (March 1983).
- "Charlie Speed," Antioch Review, vol. 44, no. 1 (Winter 1986).
- "On-Foot," The North American Review, Vol. 271, No. 4 (December 1986).
- “A State of Permanent Revolution: Ethiopia Bleeds Red,” Harper's Magazine (January 1987).
- "How They Play the Game in Jubba" (book review), The New York Times Book Review (July 3, 1988).
- "It Brought Out the Worst in Everyone" (book review), The New York Times Book Review (Dec. 25, 1988).
- "Back Bay to the Bundu," The New Yorker (April 22, 1991).
- "Makonde Carvers," Story Magazine (Autumn 1991).
- "Why Is the Sky So Far Away," StoryQuarterly
- "A Thief in My House," StoryQuarterly
- "The Texan," StoryQuarterly
- "She Hears, Falling, the Seed," Arrival
