= Darlington School =

Private prep school in Rome, Georgia, US

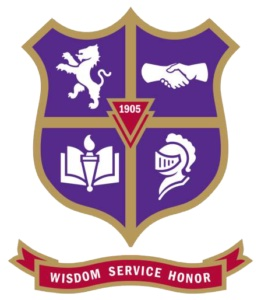

Location
- 1014 Cave Spring Road SW; Rome, Georgia 30161-4700; United States; 34.226°N 85.183°W

Information
- School type: Private, Pre-K to 12
- Motto: Wisdom More Than Knowledge Service Beyond Self Honor Above Everything
- Religious affiliation: Nondenominational
- Established: 1905
- Founder: John Paul Cooper
- Chairperson: Scott Dozier ('73)
- Head of School: L. Brent Bell
- Grades: Pre-K to 12
- Enrollment: 850
- Student to teacher ratio: 8:1
- Campus size: 500 acres
- Houses: Summerbell, Cooper, Moser, Regester, Neville, Thornwood
- Colors: Purple, White
- Athletics conference: GHSA
- Mascot: Tiger
- Team name: Tigers
- Accreditation: AdvancED, MSA, SAIS
- Newspaper: Darlingtonian
- Yearbook: Jabberwokk
- Website: darlingtonschool.org

Darlington School is a private, coeducational, college-preparatory day and boarding school in Rome, Georgia. It was founded in 1905.

It serves students from pre-kindergarten to grade 12, and is divided into a Pre-K to 8 division and an Upper School division. The student body represents more than 20 countries each year. The Head of School is Brent Bell, the Upper School Director is Chad Woods, and the Pre-K to 8 Director is Hope Jones.

== History ==
Founded in 1905 by John Paul and Alice Allgood Cooper, Darlington School was named in honor of a teacher by his former students at the J. M. Proctor School for Boys in Rome.

The school opened Sept. 11, 1905, with Founding Headmaster Dr. James Ross McCain teaching 24 boys in eight classes in the upstairs room above the Rome Fire Department station in East Rome. The school moved to East Ninth Street in 1906.

In December 1916, the current site of Darlington School, the 500-acre DeSoto Park was purchased by John Paul Cooper. The school was moved to its current location in 1923, and enrolled 30 boarding students in addition to continuing with day school.

In April 1973, Darlington consolidated with Thornwood School for Girls. The Lower School was situated at the Thornwood campus on Shorter Avenue in downtown Rome, the Middle School continued in the former Junior School building, and the Upper Schools combined at the main campus.

In 1980 and 1988, kindergarten and pre-kindergarten were added, respectively. In 2013, Darlington sold the Thornwood campus to Shorter University and moved the Lower School to the main campus. Annual total enrollment is approximately 750 students from 25 countries in grades PK-12.

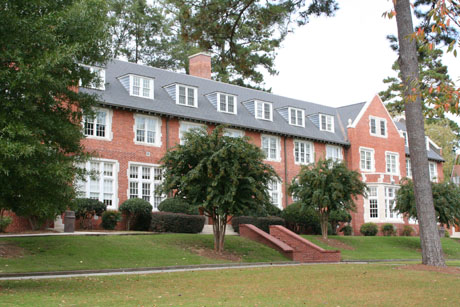
Wilcox Hall (formerly Old Main) is the main administrative building for Darlington School. It houses the Head of School's office, other Administrators, and Moser and Neville Boys' Houses.

Darlington's campus is the location of Alhambra-Home on the Hill, the oldest residence in Floyd County, and now the residence of every Head of School.

Darlington School uses an English public school-style house system in the Upper School. Each house is led by a Head of House faculty member and resident and day student prefects. Boys' houses include Summerbell, Moser, and Neville. Girls' houses include Cooper, Regester, and Thornwood.

The school participates in Greater Opportunities for Access to Learning (GOAL), a Georgia program which offers a state income tax credit to donors of scholarships to private schools.

== Sexual abuse allegations ==
In June 2017, in the wake of teacher-student sexual abuse allegations at Choate Rosemary Hall, Darlington announced an investigation into sexual abuse between its faculty and students. A student had reported sexually inappropriate behavior by a teacher who served as a dorm master in the 1980s. The student claims the inappropriate behavior was reported to the school administration and nothing was done at the time. Darlington hired a law firm to investigate the claims in 2016, and in 2017 sent a letter to former and current students informing them of the investigation. Twenty male students settled a lawsuit with the teacher in 2021, clearing the way to seek a settlement with the school's insurance company. In 2022 the school unveiled a monument dedicated to the victims of sexual abuse at the school.

== Notable alumni and staff ==
- Jane Campbell – professional soccer player
- Ron DeSantis – 46th governor of Florida, former faculty member
- James Dickey – poet, novelist, author of Deliverance. Post-graduate year from 1941 to 1942. Dickey denounced Darlington in a 1981 letter to the principal and asked to be expunged from the rolls saying "a more disgusting combination of cant, hypocrisy, cruelty, class privilege and inanity I have never since encountered at any human institution."
- Elson Floyd – 10th president of Washington State University
- Walter Gilbert – inductee of the College Football Hall of Fame
- William M. "Sonny" Landham – actor, politician
- Bruce Levingston – concert pianist
- Adam Marcus – mathematician
- Will Muschamp – co-defensive coordinator for the University of Georgia’s football team and former head football coach at the University of South Carolina
- Shawn Powell – NFL punter
- Tate Ratledge – NFL offensive guard for the Detroit Lions
- Melanie Sumner – novelist and writer
- Cy Twombly – artist
- Ernest Vandiver – 73rd governor of Georgia
- Calder Willingham – novelist and screenwriter (The Graduate)
