= Mary Helen Stefaniak =

American writer (born 2001)

Mary Helen Stefaniak is an American writer. She comes from the family of Croats from Hungary, that originates from Novo Selo (Tótújfalu) in Hungary, being thus a part of the indigenous Croatian minority in that country. She is the author of the books Self Storage and Other Stories, The Turk and My Mother, and The Cailiffs of Baghdad, Georgia. Her collection of short stories Self Storage and Other Stories, received the Banta Award from the Wisconsin Library Association for the best book (fiction or non-fiction) published by a Wisconsin author in 1997. She is also the winner of the Binghamton University John Gardner Fiction Book Award for her first novel, The Turk and My Mother, which has been translated into several languages. Stefaniak has been featured twice in the anthology New Stories from the South: The Year's Best, (2000 and 2006). In September 2010, independent publishers rated her novel The Cailiffs of Baghdad, Georgia as an Indie-Next "Great Read".

She teaches creative writing at Creighton University in Omaha, Nebraska and is a faculty mentor at Pacific University in Forest Grove, Oregon. She and her husband live in Iowa City. They have a son, Jeff, and two daughters, Liz and Lauren.

In 2011, she won the Anisfield-Wolf Book Award for The Cailiffs of Baghdad, Georgia. Anisfield-Wolf awards "recognize books that have made important contributions to our understanding of racism and our appreciation for the rich diversity of human cultures."
