= Peggy Payne =

American writer

- Born: 1949 (age 76–77); Wilmington, North Carolina
- Occupation: Author
- Spouse: Bob Dick (psychologist)
- Website: PeggyPayne.com

Peggy Payne (born 1949) is a writer, journalist and consultant to writers. She has written four books and her articles, reviews and essays have appeared in The New York Times, Cosmopolitan, The Washington Post, the Los Angeles Times, and Chicago Tribune, among others. Her work deals primarily with religion and spirituality.

== Biography ==
Peggy Payne writes novels that focus on the intersection of sex and spirituality. Her most recent, Cobalt Blue (2013) has been published in 5 countries and won a 2014 IPPY for Visionary Fiction. It is probably the only novel to be a book of the month on a Playboy Radio Network program and in the top 100 spiritual books for Kindle.

Payne was born in 1949 in Wilmington, North Carolina. She graduated from Duke University in 1970 and worked for The Raleigh Times for two years before beginning her freelance career, which lasted over three decades.

She was awarded the Sherwood Anderson Award for 2003, given in memory of Sherwood Anderson, author of Winesburg, Ohio. She has received an NEH grant to study fiction at Berkeley, an Indo-American Fellowship to research Sister India (one of her books) in Varanasi, and a North Carolina Arts Council Fellowship.

Her work has been cited in The Best American Short Stories and published in anthologies including God: Stories, edited by Atlantic Monthly fiction editor C. Michael Curtis; New Stories from the South; and Remarkable Reads. An interview with her, "Writing and Revelation," is included in Dale Brown's Of Fiction and Faith: Twelve American Writers Talk about Their Vision and Work.

== Books ==
=== Cobalt Blue ===
An artist is overwhelmed by a spiritual and physical experience that initially turns her life upside down, plunging her into compulsions, obsessions, and unmentionable attractions. She has to find out what has overcome her and learn how to deal with the power she'd never imagined. The story is set in the resort towns of Pinehurst, NC, and New Orleans.

=== Sister India ===
Her novel, Sister India, was published in 2002. It tells the story of a morbidly obese American woman living in India hiding from the life she tried to escape in North Carolina. The book is the story of her courageous emergence.

Sister India was on The New York Times list of notable books of 2001.

=== Revelation ===
Published in 1988, Revelation is the story of a calm and collected minister, Swain Hammond, in Chapel Hill, North Carolina. One day, while grilling food in his backyard, he hears God speaking to him. However, neither he nor most of his congregation believe in a god who does such a thing. Hammond, therefore, faces the difficult decision of whether to risk his livelihood by going public about the ordeal or keep secret the very thing his career is supposedly devoted to teaching.

=== The Healing Power of Doing Good ===
The Healing Power of Doing Good: The Health and Spiritual Benefits of Helping Others was Payne's second book, written with Allan Luks and published in 1991. In it, she argues, based on scientific evidence, that helping others mitigates both the intensity and the awareness of physical pain, reduces chronic hostility, and decreases the constriction within the lungs, leading to asthma attacks. She and Luks also make famous the term "helper's high," which describes a feeling of exhilaration and a burst of energy similar to that experienced after intense exercise, followed by calmness and serenity.

This can be corroborated by the Mother Teresa effect, in which researchers showed 132 Harvard students a film about Mother Teresa's work among Calcutta's poor people. The scientists then measured the level of immunoglobin A, the body's first defense against the common cold, in their saliva. The test revealed markedly increased levels of immunoglobin A, all after simply witnessing somebody else involved in charity work.

=== Doncaster ===
Doncaster: A Legacy of Personal Style was Payne's third book published in 1997. It depicts a women's clothing company that is built on helping every person, be it an employee or customer, develop their individual style and meet their personal goals.

Payne said of her own philosophy while writing for the company:

I found as I began work on this project, sponsored by the clothing company, that what might have been for me a routine copy-writing job instead became an important piece of my life's work. As an outsider to the company, I realized early in the process of the research that this organization was serious—and enthusiastic—about encouraging the development of individual potential. This was a philosophy close to my own heart, an idea that I too want to promote. So writing for Doncaster helped me get out a piece of my message. Thus, I became an example of the company's hiring philosophy: to find people who can meet the company's needs through fulfilling their own individual dreams.
