= Bruce Levingston =

American concert pianist

Bruce Levingston is an American concert pianist known for his interpretations of contemporary music.

Levingston was born and grew up in the Mississippi Delta. He was educated at Darlington School in Rome, Georgia, graduating in 1979.

Levingston has performed many times at Carnegie Hall and Lincoln Center. He has been hailed for his adventurousness by The New York Times. In a 2011 review, critic Steve Smith wrote that "Mr. Levingston, in particular, values illuminating connections among the pieces he programs."

In 2001, he started the Premiere Commission, a foundation underwriting new and contemporary works. Levingston is the Chancellor's Honors College Artist in Residence and holds the Lester Glenn Fant Chair at the University of Mississippi.

He lives in New York City and Oxford, Mississippi.

== Recordings ==
- Still Sound
- Heart Shadow
- Heavy Sleep
