= Keith Lee Morris =

American author

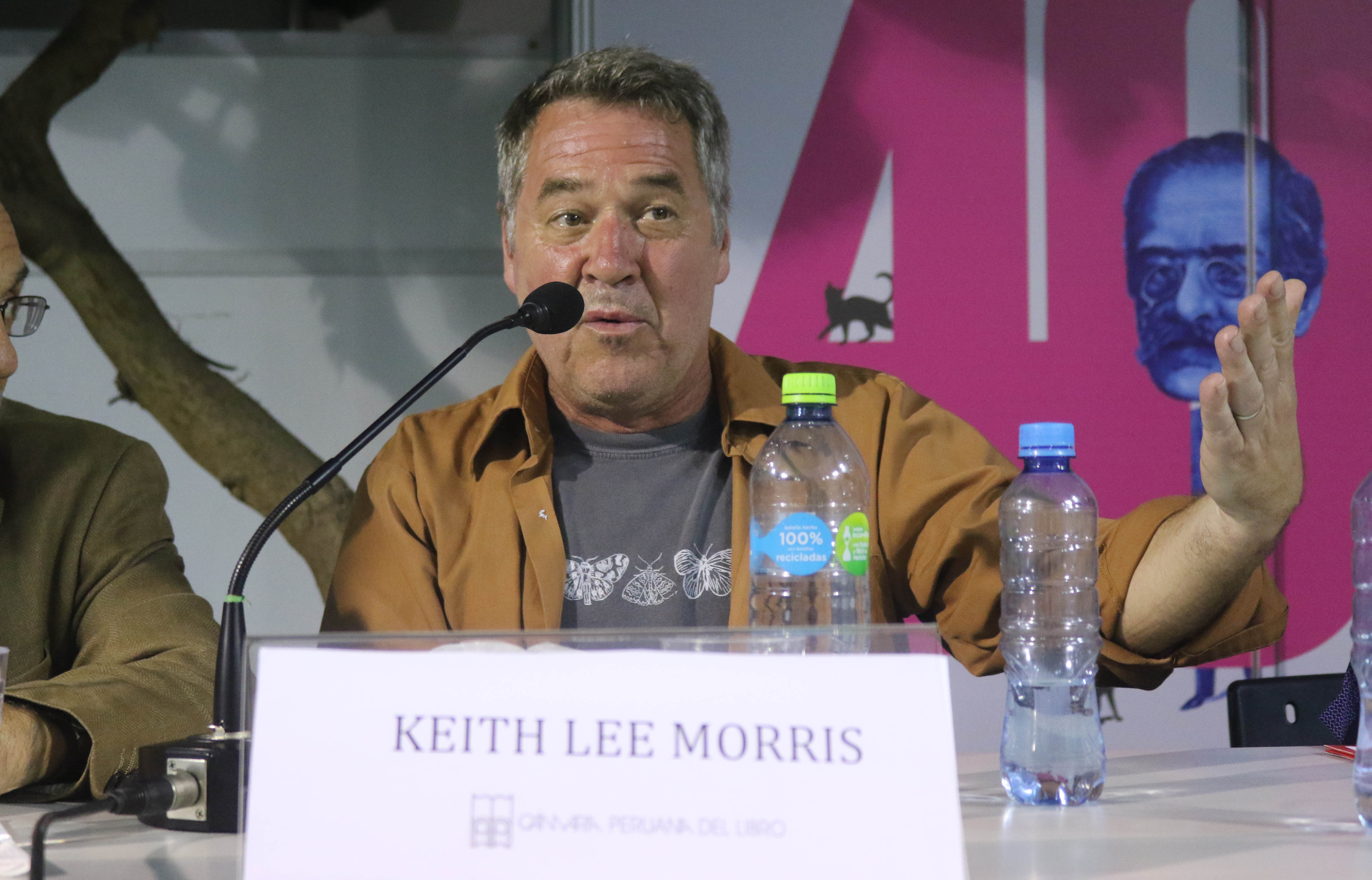
- Morris in 2019
- Education: University of North Carolina at Greensboro (MFA)
- Occupation: Author

Keith Lee Morris is an American author who has published three novels, The Greyhound God (University of Nevada Press, 2003), The Dart League King (Tin House Books, 2008) and Traveler's Rest (Little, Brown and Company, 2016) as well as two collections of short stories, The Best Seats in the House and Other Stories (University of Nevada Press, 2004) and Call It What You Want (Tin House Books, 2010). His work has been published in A Public Space, Tin House, The Southern Review, Ninth Letter, Story Quarterly, The New England Review, The Cincinnati Review, and The Georgia Review.

Morris received his MFA in Writing from the University of North Carolina at Greensboro. He is currently an Associate Professor in creative writing in the Clemson University English Department.

== Accolades ==
Morris's novel, The Dart League King, garnered a starred review and "Pick of the Week" in Publishers Weekly and a starred review from Booklist.

His story "Tired Heart" was included in the collection New Stories from the South: The Year's Best, 2006.

His story "The Culvert" won the 2005 Eudora Welty Prize.
