= Pam Durban =

American novelist and short story writer

- Born: Rosa Pam Durban; March 4, 1947 (age 78); Aiken, South Carolina, U.S.
- Occupation: Novelist; short story writer
- Education: University of North Carolina at Greensboro; University of Iowa (MFA)
- Notable awards: Lillian Smith Book Award 2001 So Far Back; Townsend Prize for Fiction 1994 The Laughing Place; Whiting Award 1987 Fiction

Rosa Pam Durban (born March 4, 1947, in Aiken, South Carolina) is an American novelist and short story writer.

== Life ==
Durban graduated from the University of North Carolina at Greensboro and from the University of Iowa with an M.F.A. in 1979. She wrote for the Atlanta Gazette from 1974 to 1975.

She taught at the State University of New York at Geneseo, Murray State University, and Ohio University. She was also founding co-editor, along with David Bottoms of Five Points. She taught at Georgia State University from 1986 to 2001 and at the University of North Carolina at Chapel Hill from 2001.

Her work has appeared in Blackbird Review, Tri-Quarterly, Crazyhorse, the Georgia Review, The Southern Review, Epoch, The New Virginia Review, and The Ohio Review.

== Awards ==
- 2001 Lillian Smith Book Award for So Far Back
- 1994 Townsend Prize for The Laughing Place
- 1987 Whiting Award in Fiction
- 1984 Rinehart Award for Fiction

== Works ==
- All Set About with Fever Trees and Other Stories. David R. Godine. 1985. ISBN 978-0-879-23569-7.
- The Laughing Place. Scribner's. 1993. ISBN 978-0-684-19258-1.
- So Far Back. Macmillan. 2001. ISBN 978-0-312-28347-6.
- The Tree of Forgetfulness: A Novel. Louisiana State University Press. 2012. ISBN 978-0-807-14972-0.
- Soon: Stories. University of South Carolina Press. 2015. ISBN 978-1-61117-533-2.

=== Anthologies ===
- John Updike; Katrina Kenison, eds. (2000). "Soon". The Best American Short Stories of the Century. Houghton Mifflin Harcourt. ISBN 978-0-395-84367-3.
- Anne Tyler; Shannon Ravenel, eds. (2005). "Gravity". Best of the South: From the Second Decade of New Stories from the South. Algonquin Books. ISBN 978-1-56512-470-7.

=== Stories and essays ===
- "The Old King". Blackbird. Virginia Commonwealth University. Spring 2004.
