= Wendy Brenner =

American writer

- Education: University of Florida; Oberlin College

Wendy Brenner is an American writer of fiction and nonfiction, born and raised in Chicago, Illinois. She taught writing as an associate professor at University of North Carolina Wilmington from 1997-2023, where she won the university's Graduate Mentor Award for her work with MFA students. Brenner is the author of two books, the first of which won the Flannery O'Connor Award for Short Fiction. Her short stories and essays have appeared in such magazines as Allure, Seventeen, Travel & Leisure, The Oxford American, The Sun (magazine), Ploughshares, and Mississippi Review, and have been anthologized in The Best American Essays, Best American Magazine Writing, and New Stories From the South, as well as other anthologies. She is the recipient of a National Endowment for the Arts Fellowship for her fiction, and is a Contributing Editor for The Oxford American. In 2016, she was named one of the "Queens of Nonfiction: 56 Women Journalists Everyone Should Read" on New York magazine's "The Cut" blog. Brenner now lives in Chicago, where she works in art-framing, as she describes in an essay in The Oxford American 2024 Art Issue.

== Bibliography ==
=== Books ===
- Phone Calls From the Dead (2001)
- Large Animals in Everyday Life: Stories (1997)

== Education ==
- Master of Fine Arts from the University of Florida, 1991.
- Bachelor of Arts from Oberlin College, 1987.

== Awards ==
- Flannery O'Connor Award for Short Fiction (for Large Animals In Everyday Life)
- National Magazine Award Finalist, 2006
- National Endowment for the Arts Fellowship
- Associated Writing Programs Intro Award
- Transatlantic Review/Henfield Foundation Award.
