= David Huddle =

American writer and professor (1942–2025)

David Ross Huddle
- Born: July 11, 1942; Ivanhoe, Virginia, U.S.
- Died: October 7, 2025 (aged 83); Burlington, Vermont, U.S.
- Occupations: Essayist; poet
- Partner: Lindsey Huddle
- Children: 2

Academic work
- Discipline: Creative writing
- Institutions: University of Vermont; Middlebury College

David Ross Huddle (July 11, 1942 – October 7, 2025) was an American writer and professor. His poems, essays, and short stories have appeared in The New Yorker, Esquire, Harper's Magazine, The New York Times Magazine, Story, The Autumn House Anthology of Poetry, and The Best American Short Stories. His work has also been included in anthologies of writing about the Vietnam War. He was the recipient of two National Endowment for the Arts fellowships and taught creative fiction, poetry, and autobiography at the University of Vermont and at the Bread Loaf School of English at Middlebury College. Huddle was born in Ivanhoe, Wythe County, Virginia, and he was sometimes considered an Appalachian writer. He served as an enlisted man in the U.S. Army from 1964 to 1967, in Germany as a paratrooper and then in Vietnam as a military intelligence specialist.

Huddle died on October 7, 2025, at the age of 83.

== Bibliography ==
Poetry collections

- Paper Boy (University of Pittsburgh Press, 1979)
- Stopping by Home (Peregrine Smith Books, 1988)
- The Nature of Yearning: Poems (Peregrine Smith Books, 1992)
- Summer Lake: New and Selected Poems (Louisiana State University Press, 1999)
- Grayscale: Poems' (Louisiana State University Press, 2004)
- Glory River: Poems (Louisiana State University Press, 2008)
- Roanoke Pastorale, A Villanelle in Simplicity (Palindrome Press, 2011)
- Blacksnake at the Family Reunion (Louisiana State University Press, 2012)
- Dream Sender (Louisiana State University Press, 2015)
- My Surly Heart (Louisiana State University Press, 2019)

Fiction

- Dream with No Stump Roots in It: Stories (University of Missouri Press, 1975)
- Only the Little Bone: Stories (David R. Godine, 1986)
- The High Spirits: Stories of Men and Women (David R. Godine, 1989)
- Intimates: A Book of Stories (David R. Godine, 1993)
- A David Huddle Reader: Selected Prose and Poetry (University Press of New England, 1994)
- Tenorman: A Novella (Chronicle Books, 1995)
- The Story of a Million Years (Houghton Mifflin, 1999)
- Not: A Trio: Two Stories and a Novella (University of Notre Dame Press, 2000)
- La Tour Dreams of the Wolf Girl (Houghton Mifflin, 2002)
- Nothing Can Make Me Do This (Tupelo Press, 2012)
- The Faulkes Chronicle (Tupelo Press, 2014)
- My Immaculate Assassin (Tupelo Press, 2016)
- Hazel (Tupelo Press, 2019)

Essay collections

- The Writing Habit: Essays (University of Vermont/University Press of New England, 1994)

Anthologies edited

- About These Stories: Fiction for Fiction Writers and Readers (Edited with Ghita Orth, Allen Shepherd; McGraw Hill, 1995)
