= Writers' League of Texas =

Professional organization

The Writers' League of Texas was established in 1981 as the Austin Writers' League in Austin, Texas. It is a nonprofit professional organization whose primary purpose is to provide a forum for information, support, and sharing among writers, to help members improve and market their writing skills, and to promote the interests of writers and the writing community.

== Organization ==
The League is composed of published and unpublished writers. In 1996, the League had 1,600 members around the world, making it the second largest regional writers' group, after the Washington Independent Writers, which served as inspiration.

The current name, Writers' League of Texas, reflects its current membership base, over 50% of which resides outside the Central Texas area, and represents the numerous programs offered to the entire community of Texas writers.

The WLT is partially funded by the City of Austin, Texas Commission on the Arts, and National Endowment for the Arts.
