= R. T. Smith =

American poet (1947–2024)

Rodney Theodore Smith (April 13, 1947 – December 24, 2024) was an American poet, fiction writer, and editor who published as R.T. Smith. The author of twelve poetry collections and a collection of short fiction, Smith served as editor of Shenandoah, a prestigious literary journal published by Washington and Lee University. His poetry and stories are identified with Southern literature and have been published in magazines and literary journals such as The Atlantic Monthly, Poetry, Southern Humanities Review, and The Kenyon Review. His work has also been reprinted in Best American Poetry, Best American Short Stories, and other anthologies.

== Life ==
Smith was born on April 13, 1947 in Washington D.C. to Mary Helen Thaxton and Roland McCall Smith, an FBI agent and later an arson investigator. He was of Scotch-Irish and Tuscarora ancestry. Smith spent his summers with his extended family is rural Georgia and, in 1953 moved to Charlotte, North Carolina with his parents.

Smith studied at three different universities without graduating, then joined the U.S. Marine Corps. He served in the Vietnam War until being sent home after receiving an infection from field surgery. He then graduated from the University of North Carolina at Charlotte in 1969 with a degree in philosophy, followed by a masters degree at Appalachian State University.

== Death ==
Rodney T. Smith died on December 24, 2024. He died peacefully at his home in Lexington Virginia.

== Academic and editing career ==
While at Appalachian State University, Smith founded Cold Mountain Review. He also taught for nineteen years as an English professor at Auburn University, where he was named an Alumni Writer-In-Residence.

At Auburn Smith co-edited Southern Humanities Review. He served as editor of Shenandoah, a prestigious literary journal published by Washington and Lee University, where he also taught creative writing and literature courses in the English Department.

He taught poetry and fiction in the Low-Residency MFA program in Creative Writing at Converse College.

== Themes and critical response ==
The Literature of the American South: A Norton Anthology noted that Smith's writings frequently focused on the rituals and histories connected with both the Native American and Celtic aspects of his ancestry, adding that Smith's poetry "carefully scans landscape, ritual, and history for what they can bring to the modern age."

A. R. Ammons praised Smith's 1986 book of poetry Birch-Light, saying "There is sizable multiplicity and profound searching, the searching and the finding equally convincing." Kirkus Reviews described his 2006 short fiction collection Uke Rivers Delivers: Stories as being "firmly in the tradition of great Southern storytelling."

== Awards ==
Smith's writings have won the Pushcart Prize and been collected in Best American Poetry, Best American Short Stories, and New Stories From the South. He received fellowships from the National Endowment for the Arts, the North Carolina Arts Council, and the Alabama Council on the Arts (he also received the Alabama Governor's Award for Achievement by an Artist). Two of his poetry collections have been nominated for the Pulitzer Prize for Poetry. Other awards include the Library of Virginia Poetry Prize and the Maurice English Poetry Award.

== Bibliography ==
=== Selected poetry collections ===
- Outlaw Style: Poems (Arkansas Poetry Series, 2007)
- The Hollow Log Lounge (University of Illinois Press, 2003). Winner of the 2004 Maurice English Poetry Award.
- Brightwood (Louisiana State University Press, 2003)
- Messenger (Louisiana State University Press, 2001). Winner of the Library of Virginia Poetry Prize.
- Split the Lark: Selected Poems (1999)
- Trespasser (1996). Nominated for the Pulitzer Prize for Poetry.
- Hunter-Gatherer (Livingston University Press, 1996)
- The Cardinal Heart (1991). Nominated for the Pulitzer Prize for Poetry.
- From the High Dive (1983)

=== Fiction ===
- Faith: Stories (Black Belt Press, 1995)
- Uke Rivers Delivers: Stories (Yellow Shoe Press, 2006)
- The Calaboose Epistles (Iris Press, 2009)

=== As editor ===
- Common Wealth: Contemporary Poets of Virginia (2003, with Sarah Kennedy).
