= Cary Holladay =

American writer and professor

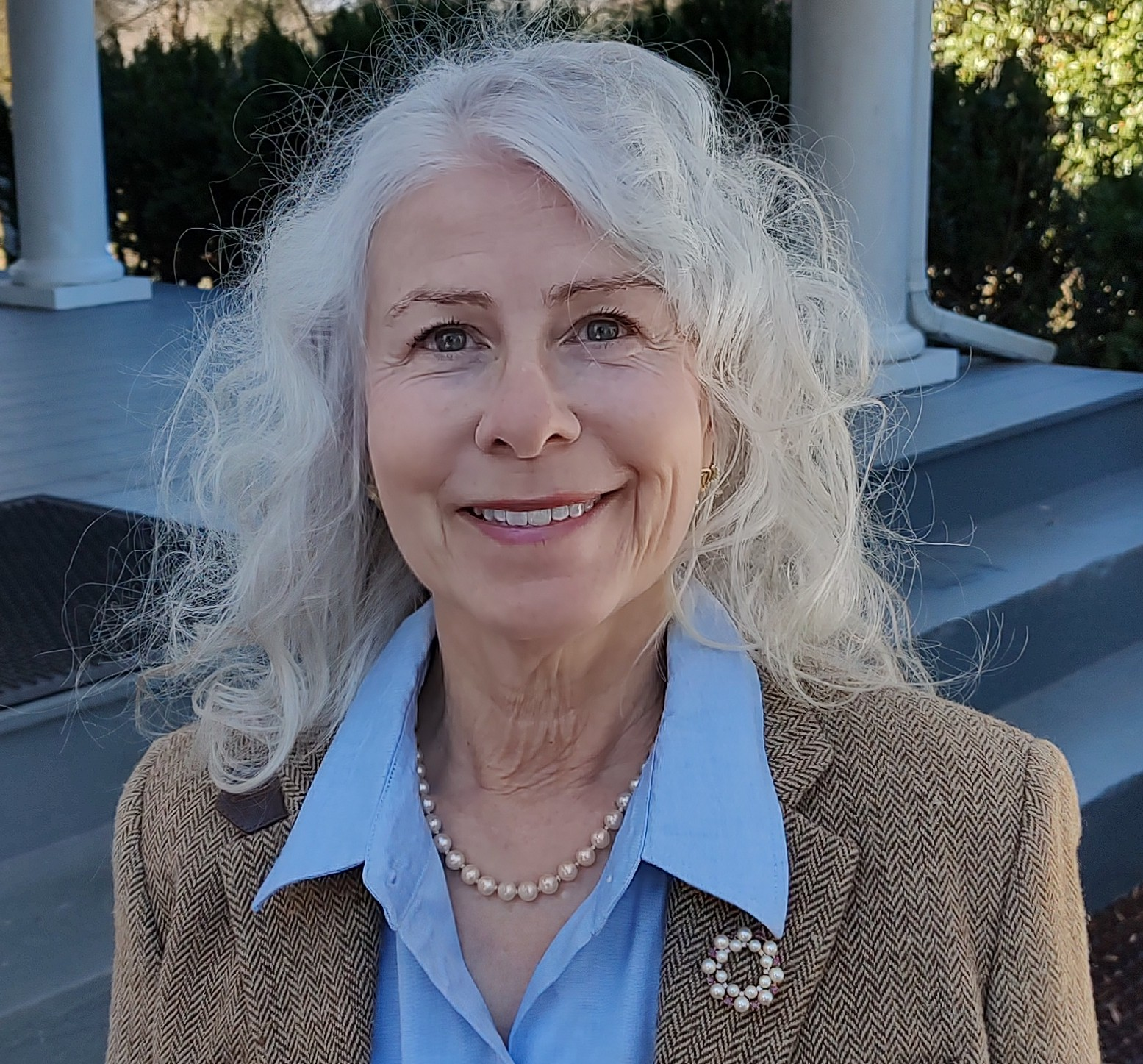
- Born: Richmond, Virginia
- Education: College of William and Mary (BA), Pennsylvania State University (MA)
- Occupations: Author, teacher
- Spouse: John Bensko
- Writing career
- Years active: 1989–present
- Website: www.caryholladay.net/index.htm

Cary Holladay is an American writer and professor, best known for her historical short fiction. In 1999, her story "Merry-Go-Sorry" about the West Memphis Three murder case was selected by Stephen King for an O. Henry Award.

== Biography ==
Originally from Virginia, Holladay graduated from the College of William and Mary with a B.A. and then went on to earn an M.A. from Pennsylvania State University.

She is the author of a novel, Mercury; a novella, A Fight in the Doctor's Office; and six collections of short fiction. She taught in the MFA program at the University of Memphis, with her husband, the poet John Bensko, and retired from there in 2020. In addition to awards for writing and teaching, Holladay has received fellowships from the Pennsylvania Council on the Arts, the Tennessee Arts Commission, and the National Endowment for the Arts. She currently serves as a core faculty member of the low-residency MFA program at Converse University.

Over 100 of Holladay's stories and essays have appeared in literary journals and anthologies, including The Kenyon Review, New Stories From The South, and The Oxford American among others.

== Works ==
- Glen Allen (Images of America), Arcadia Publishing, 2022
- Brides in the Sky: Stories and a Novella, Swallow Press/Ohio UP, 2019
- The Deer in the Mirror, Ohio State UP, 2013 (Winner of the 2012 Ohio State University Prize in Short Fiction)
- Horse People: Stories, Louisiana State UP, 2013
- A Fight in the Doctor’s Office, Miami UP, 2008 (Winner of the 2007 Miami University Press Novella Contest)
- The Quick-Change Artist: Stories, Swallow Press/Ohio UP, 2006
- Mercury, a novel, Shaye Areheart Books/Random House, 2002
- The Palace of Wasted Footsteps, U. of Missouri Press, 1998
- The People Down South, U. of Illinois Press, 1989
