= Lucia Nevai =

American novelist

- Born: September 11, 1945 (age 79); Des Moines, Iowa, U.S.
- Occupation: Novelist; short story writer

Lucia Nevai (born September 11, 1945) is an American novelist and short story writer, native to Des Moines, Iowa. She currently resides in upstate New York. Her novel Salvation was published in 2008 by Tin House Books. Nevai's debut novel, "Seriously," was published in 2004 by Little, Brown. Her short stories have appeared in Tin House, Iowa Review, Zoetrope All-Story, the New Yorker, Glimmer Train, and other literary magazines. Her first collection, Star Game, won the Iowa Short Fiction Award. Her second collection, Normal, was published by Algonquin Books of Chapel Hill.

== Bibliography ==
- 2008 Salvation (novel) Portland, OR: Tin House Books. ISBN 978-0-9794198-3-6
