= Reginald McKnight =

American writer

- Born: February 26, 1956 (age 70); Fürstenfeldbruck, Bavaria, Germany
- Education: Pikes Peak Community College (AA); Colorado College (BA); University of Denver (MA)
- Occupations: Short story writer; novelist
- Writing career
- Notable awards: Drue Heinz Literature Prize (1988); Whiting Award (1995)

Reginald McKnight (born February 26, 1956) is an American short story writer and novelist.

== Life ==
McKnight was born February 26, 1956, in Fürstenfeldbruck, Germany, to an Air Force family; therefore, he moved around a lot in childhood, although he calls Colorado home. He earned degrees from Pikes Peak Community College (A.A.), Colorado College (B.A.) and University of Denver (M.A.); he is also Phi Beta Kappa and received an honorary doctorate from Colorado College.

As a teacher, McKnight has been a professor of English at the University of Maryland, College Park, Carnegie Mellon University, and the University of Michigan, Ann Arbor. He also taught at the University of Pittsburgh, but left when he learned that other faculty told racist jokes about black people when he wasn't in their presence. As of 2002, he is the Hamilton Holmes Professor of English at the University of Georgia in Athens; he was also the first person to hold that position.

McKnight has had two extended stays in Africa, teaching English in Dakar, Senegal, from 1981 to 1982, and another in 1985 as part of a Thomas J. Watson Fellowship. He says that "he didn't truly consider himself a writer until he went to Africa", partly because that he was writing intensely for several hours a day while he was there, and also because, as he states, "when I left that place I had done something to myself in a really profound way--imprinted myself with the written word in ways that I hadn't prior to that". He also states that after a few weeks there, he became more aware of what he calls his "Africanness" by recognizing the same cadences in the voices of Senegalese women that he knew listening to his mother and his aunts growing up.

== Awards ==
- O. Henry Award
- 1988 Drue Heinz Literature Prize
- 1995 Whiting Award

== Works ==
- He Sleeps. Macmillan. 2002. ISBN 978-0-312-42104-5. (reprint)
- Moustapha's Eclipse. University of Pittsburgh Press. 1988. ISBN 978-0-8229-3589-6.
- I Get on the Bus. Little, Brown. 1990. ISBN 978-0-316-56055-9.
- The Kind of Light that Shines on Texas. Little, Brown. 1992. ISBN 978-0-316-56056-6.
- White Boys. Henry Holt and Co. 1999. ISBN 978-0-8050-6171-0.

=== Editor ===
- African American Wisdom. New World Library. 1994. ISBN 978-1-880032-34-3.
- Wisdom of the African World. New World Library. 1996. ISBN 978-1-880032-56-5.

=== Anthologies ===
- Shannon Ravenel, ed. (1992). "Quitting Smoking". New Stories from the South: The Year's Best, 1992, Volume 2002. Algonquin Books. ISBN 978-1-56512-011-2.
