= Bret Anthony Johnston =

American author

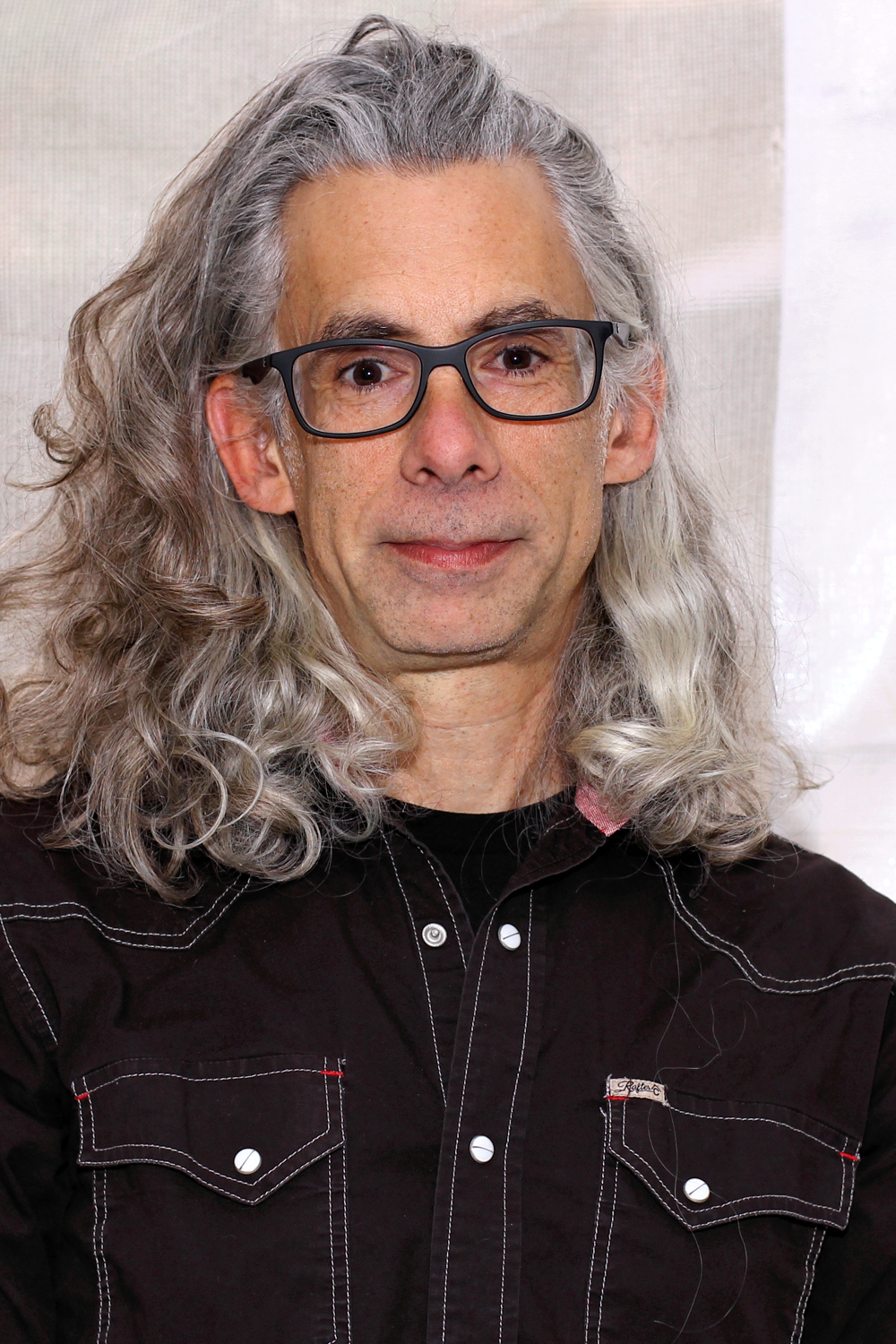
- Johnston at the 2023 Texas Book Festival.
- Born: Corpus Christi, Texas, U.S.
- Education: Miami University (BA); Iowa Writers’ Workshop (MFA)
- Occupations: Short story writer, novelist, essayist, college lecturer
- Writing career
- Genre: Fiction
- Notable works: Corpus Christi: Stories (2004); Naming the World and Other Exercises for the Creative Writer (2008); Waiting for Lightning (2012)
- Notable awards: 5 Under 35 Honoree (2006); NEA Fellowship (2006); Guggenheim Fellow (2026)
- Website: www.bret-anthony-johnston.com

Bret Anthony Johnston is an American author, novelist and essayist. He is the author of the novels Remember Me Like This and We Burn Daylight, as well as the short story collection Corpus Christi: Stories. He is the editor of the non-fiction work Naming the World and Other Exercises for the Creative Writer. He won the 2017 Sunday Times Short Story Award. In 2026, Johnston was awarded a Guggenheim Fellowship.

== Early life and education ==
Johnston was born and raised in Texas. He is a graduate of Miami University and the Iowa Writers’ Workshop, where he received his Master of Fine Arts in 2002.

== Career ==
Johnston was the recipient of a 2006 National Endowment for the Arts Literature Fellowship. His work has appeared in The New Yorker, The Atlantic, Esquire, The Paris Review, Virginia Quarterly Review, Oxford American, Tin House, The New York Times Magazine, The New York Times, Slate.com, All Things Considered, and in short story anthologies.

His debut short story collection, Corpus Christi: Stories, received the 2005 Steven Turner Award for Best First Fiction from the Texas Institute of Letters. It was shortlisted for Ireland’s Frank O'Connor International Short Story Award.

His debut novel, Remember Me Like This, was a New York Times Notable Book of the year and winner of the McLaughlin-Esstman-Stearns First Novel Prize.

Johnston's second novel, We Burn Daylight, was published in July 2024. It received a starred review from Kirkus Reviews which stated, "Johnston adeptly shifts between mundane moments and episodes of vivid drama...an evocative reimagining of the Romeo and Juliet story set amid the catastrophic collapse of a religious cult." We Burn Daylight was awarded the 2025 Jesse H. Jones Award for Best Book of Fiction from the Texas Institute of Letters and the 2024 Writers' League of Texas Book Award in Fiction.

In 2012, the documentary film Waiting for Lightning premiered at the SXSW Film Festival and was released by Samuel Goldwyn Films. The film was written by Johnston and directed by Jacob Rosenberg.

Johnston is the Director of the Michener Center for Writers at The University of Texas at Austin, where he teaches fiction writing. He was previously the Director of the Creative Writing program at Harvard University.

Johnston is also a former professional skateboarder. He briefly toured the U.S. with a sponsor and professional skateboarding crew before enrolling in graduate school. His passion for skateboarding comes up frequently in his writing and interviews.

In February 2026, Johnston released his second short story collection, Encounters with Unexpected Animals: Stories.

== Awards and honors ==
- 2005 Steven Turner Award for Best First Fiction
- 2006 National Book Foundation named a 5 under 35
- 2006 National Endowment for the Arts Fellowship
- 2015 McLaughlin-Esstman-Stearns First Novel Prize
- 2017 Sunday Times EFG Private Bank Short Story Award for "Half of What Atlee Rouse Knows About Horses"
- 2024 Writers' League of Texas Book Award in Fiction
- 2025 Jessie H. Jones Award for Best Book of Fiction
- 2026 Guggenheim Fellowship in Fiction

== Works ==
=== Fiction ===
Collections

- Corpus Christi: Stories. Random House. 2004. ISBN 9780812971873.
- Encounters with Unexpected Animals: Stories. Random House. 2026. ISBN 978-0399590153.

Novels

- Remember Me Like This. Random House. 2014. ISBN 978-1400062126.
- We Burn Daylight: A Novel. Random House. 2024. ISBN 978-0399590122.

=== Non-fiction ===
- Bret Anthony Johnston, ed. (2008). Naming the World and Other Exercises for the Creative Writer. Random House. ISBN 978-0812975482.

=== Film ===
- Waiting for Lightning (screenwriter) (2012)
