= Lewis Nordan =

American novelist

- Born: August 23, 1939; Forest, Mississippi
- Died: April 13, 2012 (aged 72); Cleveland, Ohio
- Occupations: Writer, professor
- Writing career
- Genre: Literature

Lewis Nordan (August 23, 1939 – April 13, 2012) was an American writer.

Nordan was born to Lemuel and Sara Bayles in Forest, Mississippi and grew up in Itta Bena, Mississippi. He received his B.A. at Millsaps College in Jackson, Mississippi, his M.A. in 1966 from Mississippi State University, and his PhD in 1973 from Auburn University in Alabama. After holding faculty positions at the University of Georgia and the University of Arkansas, he became in 1983 an assistant professor at the University of Pittsburgh. In 1983, at age forty-five, Nordan published his first collection of stories, Welcome to the Arrow-Catcher Fair. The collection established him as a writer in the Southern tradition of William Faulkner, Erskine Caldwell, and Flannery O'Connor. It also established a place for Nordan's fiction, the fictional Arrow Catcher, Mississippi, a small town in the Mississippi Delta based loosely on Nordan's hometown of Itta Bena.

After the short-story collection The All-Girl Football Team (1986) followed Music of the Swamp (1991), a novel/short-story cycle featuring Nordan's spiritual alter ego, the young Sugar Mecklin, as the protagonist. The book features aspects of magic realism that would become one of Nordan's trademarks, along with a peculiar mix of the tragic and the hilarious.

Wolf Whistle (1993), Nordan's second novel, was both a critical and public success. It won the Southern Book Award and gained him a wider audience. The book deals with one of the most notorious racial incidents in recent Southern history: the murder of Emmett Till.

The novel The Sharpshooter Blues (1995) is a lyrical meditation on America's gun culture, as well a depiction of grotesque lives in Itta Bena. With the coming-of-age novel Lightning Song (1997), Nordan moved from Itta Bena to the hill country of Mississippi. The novel still features Nordan's magic Mississippi realism, complete with singing llamas and poetic lightning strikes.

In 2000, Nordan published a "fictional memoir," Boy With Loaded Gun.

Before retiring in 2005, Lewis Nordan lived in Pittsburgh, Pennsylvania, where he taught Creative Writing at the University of Pittsburgh.

He lived in Hudson, Ohio until his death.

== Works ==
- Welcome to the Arrow-Catcher Fair (1983) – short stories
- The All-Girl Football Team (1986) – short stories
- Music of the Swamp (1991) – novel/short story cycle
- Wolf Whistle (1993) – novel
- The Sharpshooter Blues (1995) – novel
- Sugar Among the Freaks: Selected Stories (1996) – short stories (nothing new all reprints from first two books)
- Lightning Song (1997) – novel
- Boy With Loaded Gun (2000) – memoir
- Would You Shut Up, Please (2014) - posthumous single short story e-book

== Other media ==
Boston-based alternative rock band Twinemen wrote and recorded a song entitled Harper & the Midget. This song contains a significant portion of a story, albeit slightly modified, from Music of the Swamp , as well as religious music from a church supposedly located in Cambridge, MA. In the song, Harper cuts off the Midget's hand with a chainsaw. In the book, Harper cuts off his own hand with the chainsaw.
