= John Holman (writer) =

American short story writer, novelist, and academic

John William Holman (born 1951) is an American short story writer, novelist, and academic.

== Life ==
Holman was born in Durham, North Carolina. He graduated from the University of North Carolina in 1973, from North Carolina Central University with an MA in 1977, and from the University of Southern Mississippi with a PhD in 1983. He teaches at Georgia State University.

His work appeared in The New Yorker, Crescent Review, and Mississippi Review, Appalachee Quarterly, Carolina Quarterly, Oxford American, and Alabama Literary Review,

== Awards ==
- 1991 Whiting Award

== Works ==
=== Books ===
- Squabble and Other Stories. Ticknor & Fields. 1990. ISBN 978-0-89919-935-1.
  - "Squabble," Reprinted from The New Yorker, 28 December 1987
  - "On Earth," Reprinted from The New Yorker, 5 December 1988
  - "Monroe's Wedding," Reprinted from The New Yorker, 6 February 1989
- Luminous Mysteries. Harcourt Brace & Co. 1998. ISBN 978-0-15-100349-5.
- Triangle Ray. Dzanc Books. 2016. ISBN 9781938103377.

=== Anthologies ===
- Shannon Ravenel; Ellen Douglas, eds. (2000). "Wave". New stories from the South: the year's best, 2000. Algonquin Books. ISBN 978-1-56512-295-6.

=== Stories ===
- "Scuff," Alabama Literary Quarterly 6.1 (Fall/Winter 1992): 41–48.
- "Immaterial," Forum 27.2 (Fall/Winter 1993): 22–27
- "Credentials," Fictionaut (originally published in Mississippi Review)
