= Nanci Kincaid =

American novelist (born 1950)

- Born: Nanci Pierce; September 5, 1950 (age 75); Tallahassee, Florida, U.S.
- Education: Huguenot High School; Virginia Tech; University of Wyoming; Athens State College (BA); University of Alabama (MFA)
- Occupation: Author
- Spouse(s): Al Kincaid (divorced) Dick Tomey (m. 1997; died 2019)
- Children: 4

Nanci Pierce Kincaid (born September 5, 1950) is an American novelist who wrote a short story collection titled Pretending the Bed Is a Raft (1997), as well as novels Crossing Blood (1991), Balls (1999), Verbena (2002), and As Hot As It Was You Ought to Thank Me (2005). The film My Life Without Me was based on the title story in Pretending the Bed Is a Raft. Her most recent novel is "Eat, Drink, and be from Mississippi" (Little, Brown, 2009).

== Early life and education ==
Born Nanci Pierce in Tallahassee, Florida, Kincaid grew up in Richmond, Virginia and graduated from Huguenot High School in 1968. After attending Virginia Tech and the University of Wyoming, Kincaid completed her B.A. at Athens State College (now Athens State University) in 1987. In 1991, Kincaid completed a Master of Fine Arts degree at the University of Alabama.

== Personal life ==
She was previously married to former University of Wyoming and Arkansas State University football coach Al Kincaid. In 1997, Kincaid married college football coach Dick Tomey; their marriage lasted until Tomey's death in 2019. They had four children and five grandchildren. With Tomey, Kincaid lived in Honolulu, Hawaii; Tucson, Arizona; and San Jose, California.
