= Tim Gautreaux =

American novelist

- Born: Timothy Martin Gautreaux; 1947 (age 78–79); Morgan City, Louisiana, U.S.
- Occupations: Novelist; short story writer
- Spouse: Winborne Howell Gautreaux
- Children: 2

Timothy Martin Gautreaux (born 1947 in Morgan City, Louisiana) is an American novelist and short story writer.

His writing has appeared in The New Yorker, Best American Short Stories, The Atlantic, Harper's, and GQ. His novel The Next Step in the Dance won the 1999 SEBA Book Award. His novel The Clearing won the 1999 Southern Independent Booksellers Alliance SIBA Book Award and the 2003 Mid-South Independent Booksellers Association Award. He also won the 2005 John Dos Passos Prize.

Gautreaux also authored Same Place, Same Things and Welding with Children – collections of short stories. His 2009 novel The Missing was described as his "best yet" by New Orleans Times-Picayune book editor Susan Larson in a featured article.

Gautreaux notes that his family's blue-collar background has been a significant influence on his writing. His father was a tugboat captain, and his grandfather was a steamboat engineer. Given those influences, he says, "I pride myself in writing a 'broad-spectrum' fiction, fiction that appeals to both intellectuals and blue-collar types. Many times I've heard stories of people who don't read short stories, or people who have technical jobs, who like my fiction."

Gautreaux also tends to write from experience or what he knows. He argues an author should have a good understanding or background history over what he intends to write about, "just learned along the way that writing comes from living. Living doesn't come from writing. The best way to learn how to write about children is to have a couple of your own. You have to go through the struggle of raising them."

In addition, Gautreaux has made clear that he is not interested in being classified as a "Southern writer," preferring instead to say that he is a "writer who happens to live in the South." He is much more comfortable embracing his Roman Catholicism, saying, "I've always been a Roman Catholic, since baptism, since birth."

Gautreaux is married to Winborne Howell Gautreaux; the couple has two grown sons – Robert Timothy Gautreaux and Thomas Martin Gautreaux. They live in Chattanooga, Tennessee.

== Suggested reading ==
- Margaret D. Bauer, "An Interview with Tim Gautreaux: 'Cartographer of Louisiana Back Roads'", Southern Spaces, 28 May 2009. http://southernspaces.org/2009/interview-tim-gautreaux-cartographer-louisiana-back-roads
- Margaret D. Bauer, "Understanding Tim Gautreaux", The University of South Carolina Press, 31 January 2010. http://www.sc.edu/uscpress/books/2009/3859.html
- L. Lamar Nisly, ed, Conversations with Tim Gautreaux, Jackson: University Press of Mississippi, 2012.
- L. Lamar Nisly, Wingless Chickens, Bayou Catholics, & Pilgrim Wayfarers: Constructions of Audience and Tone in O'Connor, Gautreaux, and Percy, Macon, GA: Mercer University Press, 2011.
