= Padgett Powell =

American novelist

- Born: April 25, 1952 (age 74); Gainesville, Florida, U.S.
- Occupations: Novelist, short story writer
- Writing career
- Period: 1983–present
- Notable work: Edisto (1984)

Padgett Powell (born April 25, 1952, in Gainesville, Florida) is an American novelist in the Southern literary tradition. His debut novel, Edisto (1984), was nominated for the National Book Award and was excerpted in The New Yorker.

Powell has written five more novels — including A Woman Named Drown (1987); Edisto Revisited (1996), a sequel to his debut; Mrs. Hollingsworth's Men (2000); The Interrogative Mood: A Novel? (2009); and You & Me (2012), his most recent — and three collections of short stories. In addition to The New Yorker, Powell's work has appeared in The Paris Review, Harper's, Grand Street, Oxford American, The New York Times Book Review, and other publications.

Powell is an emeritus professor at the University of Florida, where he began teaching writing in 1976.

== Awards and honors ==
- 1984 National Book Award, nomination, Edisto
- 1986 Whiting Award
- 1987 Rome Fellowship in Literature from The American Academy of Arts and Letters.
- 2011 James Tait Black Memorial Prize, You & Me

== Works ==
Novels

- Edisto (1984)
- A Woman Named Drown (1987)
- Edisto Revisited (1996)
- Mrs. Hollingsworth's Men (2000; reissued in 2014 as Hologram)
- The Interrogative Mood: A Novel? (2009)
- You & Me (2012)

Novella

- The New Book (2024; from the anthology Blasphemy and Other Ancestors)

Story collections

- Typical (1991)
- Aliens of Affection (1998)
- Cries for Help, Various (2015)

Essay collection

- Indigo (2021)

Essays

- "Tangled Up in Indigo," Garden & Gun, April/May 2015
- "Tin House" (blog), October 15, 2015
