= Michael Parker (novelist) =

American novelist

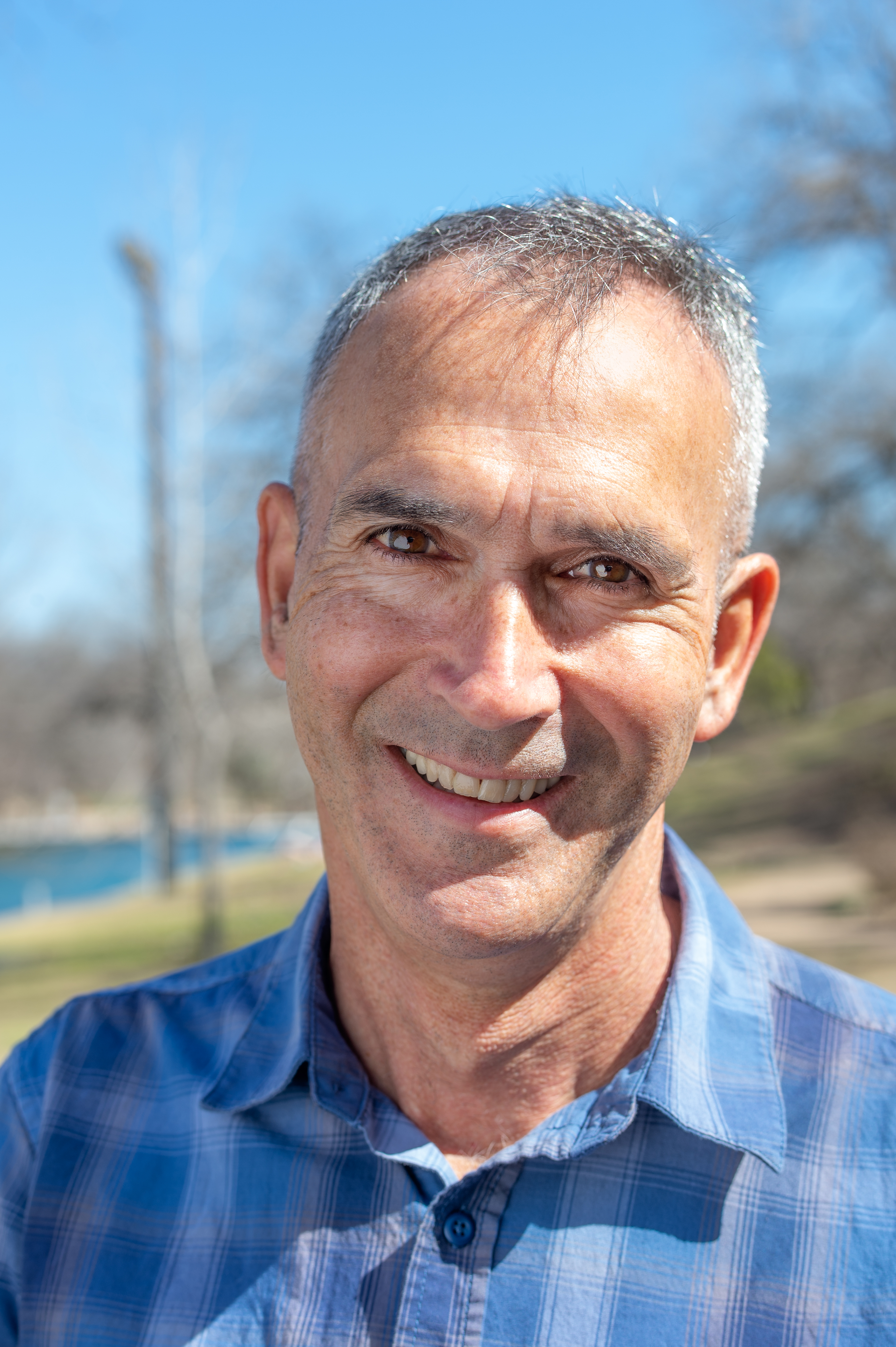
- Born: February 6, 1959 (age 67); Silver City, North Carolina, U.S.
- Education: Appalachian State University; University of North Carolina at Chapel Hill; University of Virginia (MFA)
- Occupations: Short story writer; novelist; journalist
- Website: www.michaelfparker.com

Michael Parker (born February 6, 1959) is an American short story writer, novelist and journalist.

== Life ==
Michael Parker was born in Siler City, North Carolina and grew up in Clinton, North Carolina. He attended Appalachian State University and graduated from UNC-Chapel Hill with honors in Creative Writing. Parker received his MFA from the University of Virginia in 1988.

Parker's short fiction has appeared in "New England Review," "The Oxford American," Five Points, Shenandoah, Carolina Quarterly, Epoch and The Georgia Review and has been anthologized in the Pushcart Prize Stories and New Stories from the South. His stories have received three O. Henry Awards (2005, 2014, 2018).

Parker's nonfiction has appeared in The New York Times Magazine, Runner's World, Trail Runner, Men's Journal, Gulf Coast, Our State, The Oxford American and other magazines.

Parker taught for nearly 30 years at the MFA Creative Writing Program at UNC Greensboro, and now lives in Durham, North Carolina. He is on the faculty of the MFA program for writers at Warren Wilson College.

== Awards ==
- 2026 North Carolina Literary Hall of Fame inductee
- 2023 Texas Institute of Letters inductee
- 2020 Thomas Wolfe Prize and Lecture
- 2019 long-listed for the Andrew Carnegie Medal for Excellence in Fiction for Prairie Fever
- 2018 O. Henry Prize Story
- 2014 O. Henry Prize Story
- 2010 R. Hunt Parker Award for Literature
- 2006 North Carolina Award for Literature
- 2005 O. Henry Prize Story
- 2005 Hobson Award in Arts and Letters
- 2004 Fellowship from the North Carolina Arts Council
- 2004 Fellowship from the National Endowment for the Arts
- 1994 Sir Walter Raleigh Award for Fiction, for The Geographical Cure
- 1993 finalist for the PEN/Hemingway Prize, for Hello Down There

== Works ==
- Hello Down There. Scribner. 1993. ISBN 978-0-684-19424-0.
- Towns Without Rivers. William Morrow. 2001. ISBN 978-0-380-97860-1.
- Virginia Lovers. Delphinium Books. 2004. ISBN 978-1-883285-24-1.
- If You Want Me To Stay. Algonquin Books. 2005. ISBN 978-1-56512-484-4. "Michael Parker (novelist)."
- The Watery Part of the World. Algonquin Books. 2011. ISBN 978-1-56512-682-4. "the watery part of the world."
- All I Have In This World. Algonquin Books. 2014. ISBN 978-1-61620-162-3.
- Prairie Fever, May 2019, Algonquin Books, ISBN 9781616208530
- I Am The Light of This World, November 2022, Algonquin Books. (ISBN 9781643751795)

=== Short stories ===
- The Geographical Cure. C. Scribner's Sons. 1994. ISBN 978-0-684-19682-4.
- Don't Make Me Stop Now. Algonquin Books. 2007. ISBN 978-1-56512-485-1. "Michael Parker don't make me."
- Everything, Then and Since, Bull City Press, 2017, ISBN 978-1- 4951-5767-7
