= Michael Knight (writer) =

American novelist

- Education: Hampden–Sydney College (BA); University of Southern Mississippi (MA); University of Virginia (MFA)
- Occupation: Author

Michael Knight is the author of the novels The Typist and Divining Rod, the short story collections Dogfight and Other Stories, Goodnight, Nobody and Eveningland and the book of novellas The Holiday Season. His most recent novel, The Typist, was selected as a Best Book of the Year by The Huffington Post and The Kansas City Star and appeared on Oprah's Summer Reading List in 2011. His most recent collection, Eveningland, was awarded the Truman Capote Prize for Short Fiction. It was also selected as an Editor's Choice Pick by The New York Times and as a Southern Book of the Year by Southern Living magazine. His short stories have appeared in magazines and journals like The New Yorker, Oxford American, Paris Review, Ploughshares, The Southern Review and The Saturday Evening Post, among other places.

Knight teaches creative writing at the University of Tennessee and lives in Knoxville with his family.

== Education ==
Knight received his MFA from the University of Virginia, his MA from the University of Southern Mississippi, and his BA from Hampden-Sydney College.

== Selected publications ==
Novels and short story collections

- Divining Rod (Dutton, 1998)
- Dogfight & Other Stories (Plume, 1998)
- Goodnight, Nobody (Atlantic Monthly, 2003)
- The Holiday Season (Grove, 2007)
- The Typist (Atlantic Monthly, 2010)
- Eveningland (Atlantic Monthly, 2017)
- At Briarwood School for Girls (Atlantic Monthly, 2019)

Fiction in periodicals

- "The King of Dauphin Island," Sewanee Review (winter 2017)
- "Our Lady of the Roses," The Southern Review (vol. 51, no. 1, winter 2015)
- "Water and Oil," The Southern Review (vol. 29, no. 4, autumn, 2013)
- "Jubilee," Ploughshares (vol. 39, nos. 2 & 3, fall 2013)
- "Bonny Oaks—May, 2004," The Saturday Evening Post (July, 2012)
- "The Atom Bowl," Narrative (fall 2010)
- "Grand Old Party," Oxford American (April 2008)
- "Love at the End of the Year," Cincinnati Review (vol 4, number 2, winter 2007)
- "Thanksgiving," The Southern Review (vol.41, n.4, autumn 2005)
- "Feeling Lucky," Virginia Quarterly Review (vol. 79, no. 1, winter 2003)
- "Ellen's Book," Five Points (vol 6, no.1, winter 2001)
- "Keeper of Secrets, Teller of Lies," Virginia Quarterly Review (autumn 2001)
- "The Last War Story," Mid-American Review (vol.19, no.2, spring 2000)
- "The End of Everything," GQ (December, 1999)
- "The Mesmerist," Esquire (March, 1999)
- "Birdland," The New Yorker (November 3, 1998)
- "Killing Stonewall Jackson," Story (vol. 46, no. 3 summer, 1998)
- "Tenant," Paris Review (no. 147, summer 1998)
- "Amelia Earhart's Coat," Virginia Quarterly Review (vol. 73, no. 1, winter, 1997)
- "Now You See Her," Paris Review (no. 141, winter 1996)
- "Gerald's Monkey" Playboy (October 1996)
- "Sleeping with My Dog," The Crescent Review (vol. 14, no. 3, 1996)
- "Sundays," Shenandoah (vol. 46, no. 4, winter 1996)
