= George Singleton =

American author (born 1958)

- Born: George W. Singleton III; May 13, 1958 (age 68); Anaheim, California, United States
- Occupations: Writer, writing teacher, professor
- Writing career
- Genres: Fiction, Southern Fiction
- Movements: Grit Lit, Rough South

George Singleton is an American author who has written eleven collections of short stories, two novels, a collection of essays, and an instructional book on writing fiction. He was born in Anaheim, California, and raised in Greenwood, South Carolina. Singleton graduated from Furman University in 1980 with a degree in philosophy and was an inductee into Phi Beta Kappa. He also holds an MFA degree from the University of North Carolina at Greensboro.

Singleton was the longstanding teacher of fiction writing and editing at the South Carolina Governor's School for the Arts & Humanities in Greenville, South Carolina. In 2009, Singleton was a Guggenheim fellow, and in 2011 he was awarded the Hillsdale Award for Fiction by the Fellowship of Southern Writers. In 2013, Singleton accepted the John C. Cobb Endowed Chair in the Humanities at Wofford College, where he taught until 2020. Singleton was inducted into the Fellowship of Southern Writers in April 2015, and was awarded the John William Corrington Award for Literary Excellence in 2016. In 2024, Singleton appeared on the SEC Network television program TrueSouth Presented by YellaWood.

== Works ==
=== Fiction ===
==== Short story collections ====
- These People Are Us: Stories (2001)
- The Half-Mammals of Dixie (2002)
- Why Dogs Chase Cars: Tales of a Beleaguered Boyhood (2004)
- Drowning in Gruel (2006)
- Stray Decorum (2012)
- Between Wrecks (2014)
- Calloustown (2015)
- Staff Picks (2019)
- You Want More (2020)
- The Curious Lives of Nonprofit Martyrs (2023)

==== Novels ====
- Novel (2005)
- Work Shirts for Madmen (2007)

=== Nonfiction ===
- Pep Talks, Warnings, and Screeds: Indispensable Wisdom and Cautionary Advice for Writers (2008)
- Asides: Occasional Essays on Dogs, Food, Restaurants, Bars, Hangovers, Jobs, Music, Family Trees, Robbery, Relationships, Being Brought Up Questionably, Et Cetera (2023)
