= Jill McCorkle =

American novelist

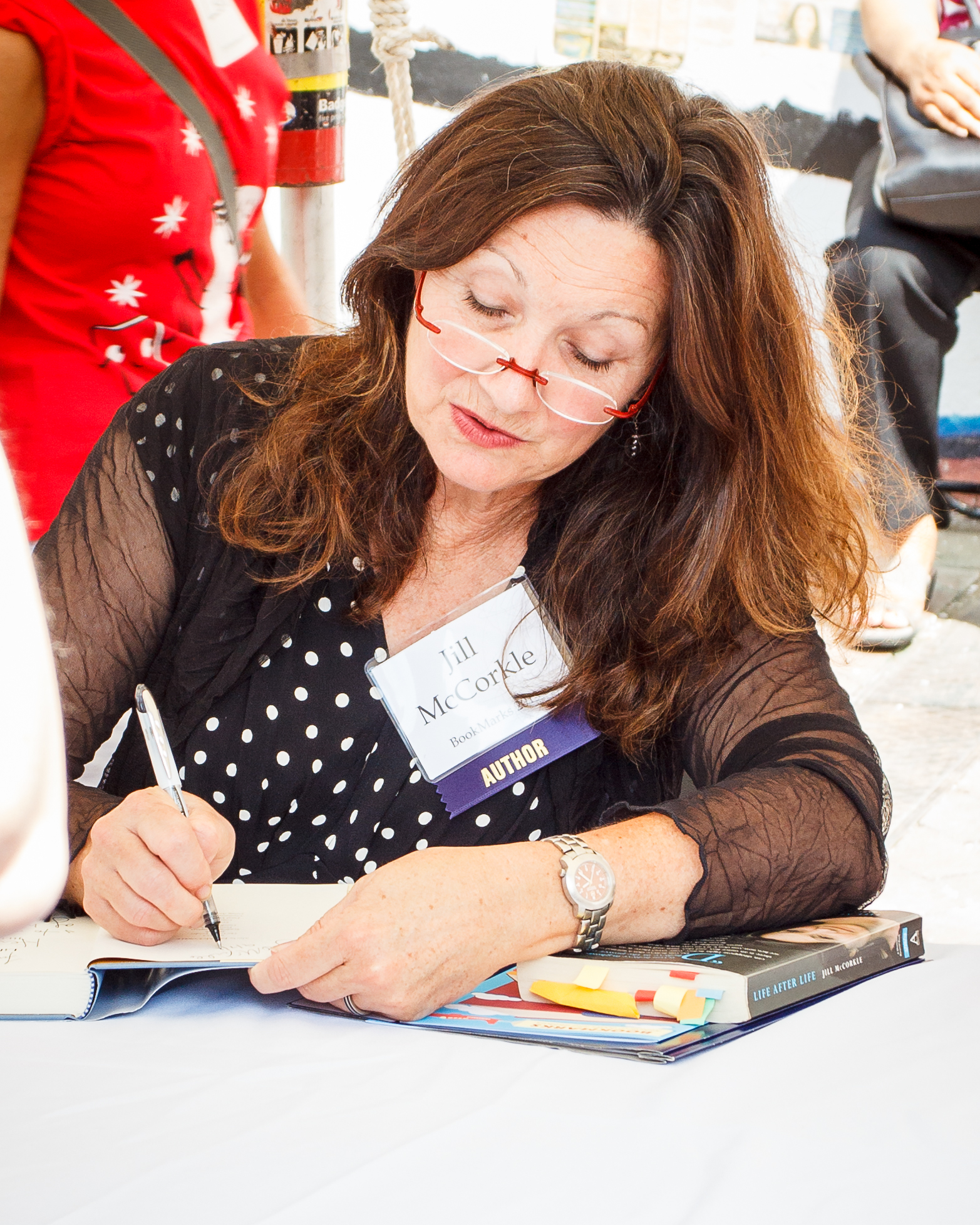
- Jill McCorkle, September 7, 2013
- Born: July 7, 1958 (age 68); Lumberton, North Carolina, U.S.
- Occupation: Writer
- Writing career
- Language: English
- Genre: Short story
- Notable awards: Dos Passos Prize
- Website: jillmccorkle.com

Jill Collins McCorkle (born July 7, 1958) is an American short story writer and novelist.

McCorkle was born in Lumberton, North Carolina. She graduated from University of North Carolina, in 1980, where she studied with Max Steele, Lee Smith, and Louis D. Rubin. She also attended Hollins College now Hollins University with Lee Smith where she received her MA. She taught at Tufts University, University of North Carolina, Duke University, Harvard University and Bennington College. She teaches at North Carolina State University.

== Awards ==
- 1993 New England Booksellers Award
- 2000 Dos Passos Prize
- 2016 Thomas Wolfe Award
- 2018 Featured speaker at the Monroe Scholars Book and Authors luncheon.

== Works ==
- The Cheer Leader. Algonquin Books. 1984. ISBN 0912697113.
- July 7th. Algonquin Books. 1984. ISBN 1565120027.
- Tending to Virginia. Shannon Ravenel Books. 1987. ISBN 0912697652.
- Ferris Beach. Algonquin Books. 1990. ISBN 1565129318.
- Crash Diet; Stories. Algonquin Books. 1992. ISBN 0945575750.
- Carolina Moon. Algonquin Books. 1996. ISBN 1565121368.
- Final Vinyl Days and Other Stories. Algonquin Books. 1998. ISBN 1565122046.
- Creatures of Habit; Stories. Shannon Ravenel Books. 2003. ISBN 1565123972.
- Going Away Shoes; Stories. Algonquin Books. 2009. ISBN 978-1565126329.
- Life After Life. Shannon Ravenel Books. 2013. ISBN 978-1616203221.
- Hieroglyphics. Algonquin Books of Chapel Hall. 2020. ISBN 978-1616209728.

=== Stories available online ===
- "Going Away Shoes", Blackbird, Fall, 2007
- "Magic Words", Narrative, Fall 2008

== Sources ==
- Barbara, Bennett (2000). Understanding Jill McCorkle. University of South Carolina Press. ISBN 1570033501.
