= StoryQuarterly =

American literary journal

- Discipline: Literary journal
- Language: English
- Edited by: Paul Lisicky

Publication details
- History: 1975-present
- Publisher: Rutgers University–Camden (United States)
- Frequency: Quarterly

Standard abbreviations
- ISO 4: StoryQuarterly

Indexing
- ISSN: 1041-0708

Links
- Journal homepage

StoryQuarterly is an American literary journal based at Rutgers University–Camden in Camden, New Jersey. It was founded in 1975 by Tom Bracken, F.R. Katz, Pamela Painter and Thalia Selz. Works originally published in StoryQuarterly have been subsequently selected for inclusion in The Prize Stories: The O. Henry Awards, The Pushcart Prize: The Best of the Small Presses, and The Best American Non-Required Reading, New Stories from the South, Best American Mysteries, and Best American Essays.

Notable writers who have contributed to this journal include Russell Banks, Richard Ford, Denis Johnson, Jacob M. Appel, Keith Lee Morris, Dan O'Brien, T. C. Boyle, Margaret Atwood, and Jhumpa Lahiri.

In 2008 StoryQuarterly was acquired by Rutgers. Paul Lisicky is now the editor.

== See also ==
- List of literary magazines
