= Virginia literature =

Literature from or about Virginia, US

The literature of Virginia, United States, is literature produced by, written within or pertaining to the American state of Virginia which is situated on the eastern coast of the US. Including fiction, non-fiction, poetry, prose, letters, travel diaries, logs, drama, belles-lettres and journalistic writing, Virginian literature has evolved and developed from pre-colonial settlement to the modern day. Virginian literature was influenced in its early years by the English establishment of the Jamestown Colony in 1607 in the Chesapeake Bay area. Literature of the region was later characterised by the Antebellum period, civil war, reconstruction, and slavery. Representative authors include James Branch Cabell, Ellen Glasgow, William Hoffman, Edgar Allan Poe, Lee Smith, Carolyn Kreiter-Foronda and William Styron. Literary journals include The Virginia Quarterly Review and The Red Brick Review of Virginia State University.

== History ==
=== Pre-colonial settlement and native indigenous literature ===
Prior to English settlement and the formation of Jamestown on the east Virginian coast in 1607, the region was home to the native Algonquian peoples, also known as the peoples of Tsenacommacah. Literature made by the early Tsenacommacans was multi-textual, not based on the English written word and took many artistic and cultural forms. Indigenous literature of early Virginia consisted of oral stories and tales, markings made on rock and the land itself, physical memorials that were used as a way of storytelling, and, other kinds of texts including "earthworks (architectonic forms of public rhetoric that embody and express civic and sacred power) and other smaller expressive forms such as effigies, pipes, and pottery".

There is some evidence to suggest that the Algonquin people used a form of hieroglyphic writing in order to communicate and record information. Written observations made by European settlers recorded that indigenous people were writing these hieroglyphic inscriptions on birch bark and in screen-fold books on a number of matters including public life, private affairs, culture, social systems and spiritual beliefs. This is known as a form of indigenous literacy or literature that employs a non-alphabetic writing system and makes use of signs and symbols in order to communicate.

=== Early literature (1600s–1700s) ===
Literature produced during the early period was predominantly written in the style of prose and focused almost exclusively on topics of exploration and settlement. Texts mostly consisted of diaries, letters, logs, political writings, promotion literature, prose, travel notes/practical manuals, religious sermons and poetry. Early writings were predominantly observational logs made by the first colonisers in service of the crown describing the landscape, indigenous peoples and conditions of settlement. Explorer and colony governor (from 1606 – 1609) George Percy, wrote the Observations, a highly detailed eye-witness account of the incidents of the first voyage to Virginia and the party's many expeditions onto land, however it was not published until 1625.

An excerpt of 'A True Relation of Virginia' by John Smith.

John Smith, explorer and captain of the newly established Virginian colony wrote frequently and in 1608 Smith's first book A True Relation of Virginia also known under the title A True Relation of such occurrences and accidents of noate as hath hapned in Virginia since the first planting of that collony, which is now resident in the South part thereof, till the last returne from thence was published at Stationers Hall in London. Attributed as a natural-born writer, Smith's account of Jamestown was a straightforward, matter-of-fact record of his journey to, settlement of, and what he witnessed and experienced within, the colony. The text itself was forthright, vivid and used direct and strong natural prose. It followed a tradition of British geographical style writing prominent at the time that documented, categorised and expounded the nature of adventure and colonisation. It describes in detail the Indigenous Powhatan peoples Smith encountered and presented Virginia as a 'Wonder of Nature' and as a 'Mirror of our Clime' in which he reflects "a vision of a heroic imperial England". As it was the first published English-language literary text of the region it helped to establish Smith's reputation as an authority on Virginia. It is cited by historians as the first piece of literature produced within and about Virginia, marking the beginning of Virginian (and also American) literary history.

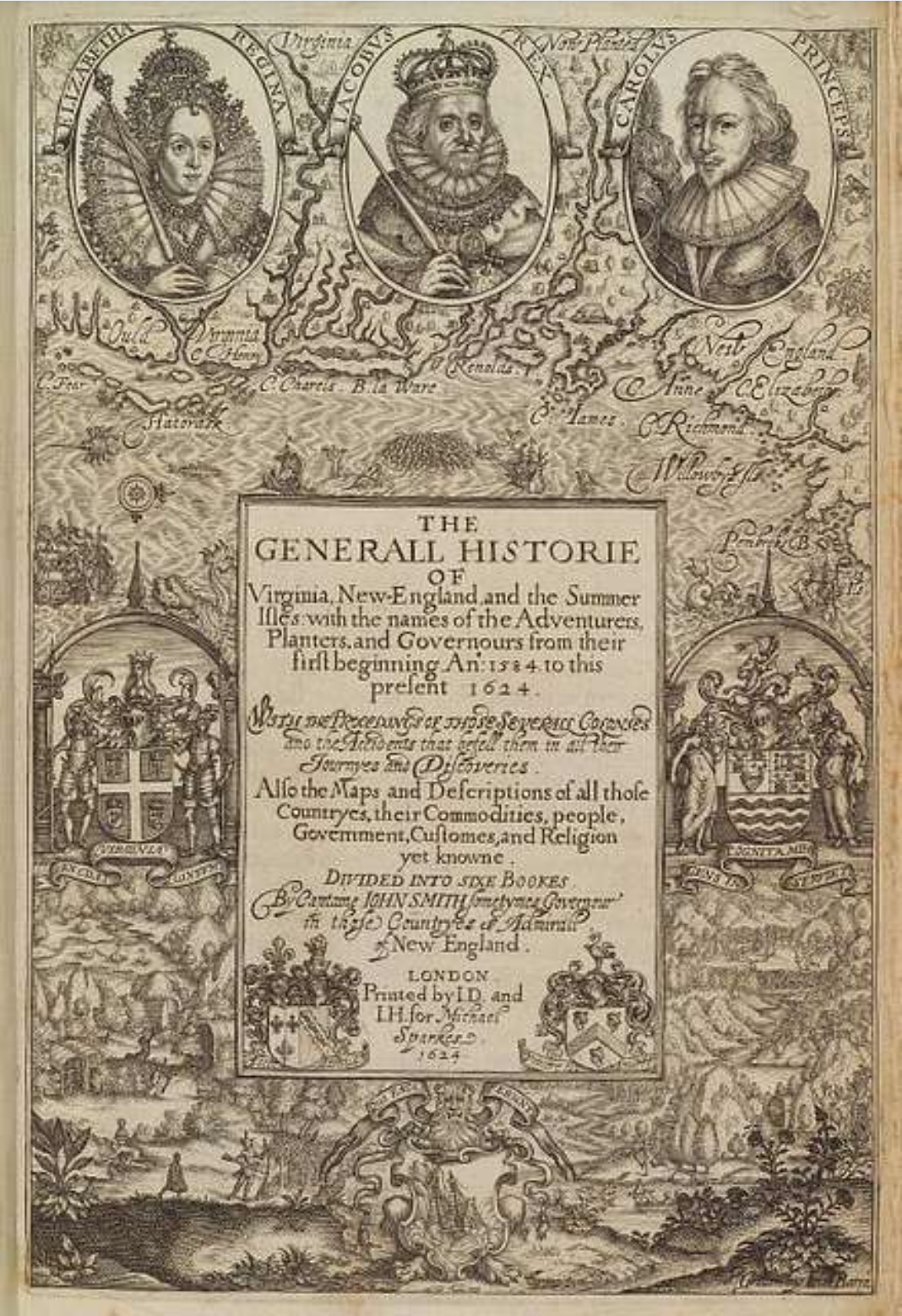
Title page of 'Generall Historie of Virginia, New-England, and the Summer Isles' by John Smith.

John Smith later published The Generall Historie of Virginia, New-England, and the Summer Isles in 1624 which was divided into six sections spread across two volumes of work. The work further described British colonial efforts in Virginia, documenting the topography & geography of the region, recording observations of the spiritual practices, systems of law, and family life of the indigenous peoples, and categorising the native flora & fauna of the land. Smith also included a short and limited dictionary of the Algonquian language. Literary scholars note that Smith's themes and the writing itself influenced later Virginian literary texts and styles, as well as other Southern writers "from Twain and Melville to Barth and Pynchon".

Throughout the settlement of Jamestown, Virginia's leaders often sought to emulate a style of poetry established during the period of the English Renaissance, a tradition of writing which was primarily concerned with topics of civic and social life. This style was widely used by their English compatriots back home. These literary traditions would stretch into the 18th Century with common types of verse included the elegy, the narrative poem, and the historical poem. William Strachey the colonial secretary of the Virginia Colony wrote several works including The Historie of Travaile Into Virginia Britannia which included the opening poem Aecclesiae et Reipub (Church and State) in which he "emphasises the inextricable link between planting a colony and planting the Christian faith, indicating that the English colonists had a religious responsibility to convert the Virginia Indians.”

A printing press began operating in Jamestown, Virginia, in 1682. Colonial- and Federal-era writers included Robert Beverley, Jr. (History and Present State of Virginia, 1705); Arthur Blackamore (Religious Triumvirate, 1720); Thomas Jefferson (Notes on the State of Virginia, 1785).

Later during the eighteenth century, letters became one of the most popular forms of literary text, the period being dubbed the golden age of letter writing due to "expanding social mobility, higher literacy rates, less expensive stationery supplies, and faster postal delivery". It is noted that the earliest descriptions of Virginia (its terrain, layout and original indigenous inhabitants) were recorded and proliferated in the literary form of the letter. A Briefe and True Report of the New Found Land of Virginia by Thomas Harriot is one such example of descriptive letters published to English audiences describing the newly colonised Virginia.

=== Literature of the 19th century ===
Virginian Literature of the 19th Century covers literature produced from 1800 to the turn of the century in 1899. This period of writing was marked by the Antebellum (meaning 'before the war') period between 1812 – 1861 and the American civil war from 1861 – 1865. The early years of the nineteenth century saw several important literary texts published including The History of the expedition under the command of Captains Lewis and Clark, to the sources of the Missouri thence across the Rocky mountains and down the river Columbia to the Pacific Ocean (1814) which recorded the expedition of Lewis and Clark (two Virginian-born explorers) and A Tour through Part of Virginia in the Summer of 1808 (1809) by John Edwards Caldwell. These texts centered on the themes of travel, history, and biography.

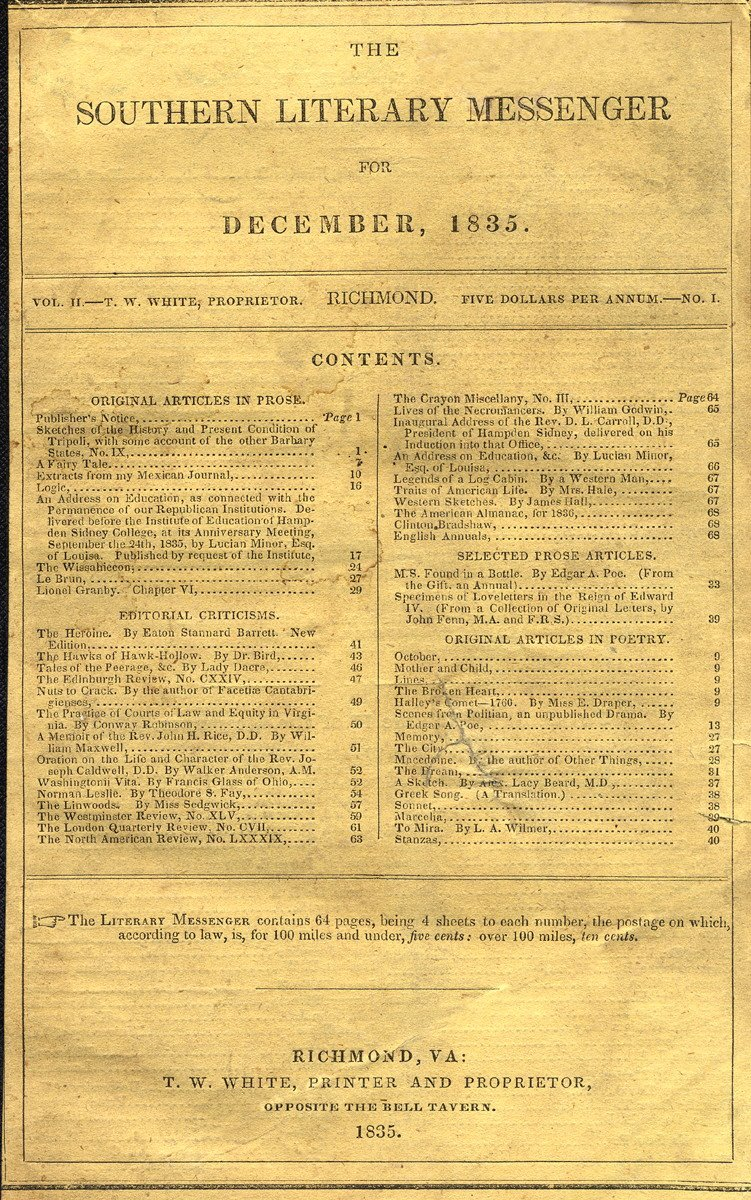
The cover of the December 1835 issue of The Southern Literary Messenger magazine, published in Richmond, Virginia (VA), by T.W. White. Included in this issue is 'M.S. Found in a Bottle' by Edgar Allan Poe.

The early Antebellum period of Virginia's literary history was marked by genres of "elegies, poems, metrical romances, narrative, satire, sentimental humour, and vers de société." Poetry on the topic of nature and the natural surrounds of the Virginia area was common and followed a tradition established in England by romantic poets such as William Wordsworth. Such writing, like previous literature written during the Jeffersonian era, was typically "written by men of the professional class – clergymen, lawyers, legislators, physicians, teachers" however in 1813 Judith Lomax became the first woman from Virginia to publish a book consisting only of her own written verse. Other women poets of the time included Anna Byrd, Martha Ann Davis and Judith Wormeley.

The Southern Literary Messenger launched in Richmond in 1834. Edgar Allan Poe a prominent literary figure of the antebellum period served as the paper's editor in chief between 1835 and 1837. Other literary figures of the period include Virginia-born writers William Alexander Caruthers (1802–1846), John Esten Cooke (1830–1886), Philip Pendleton Cooke (1816–1850), Nathaniel Beverley Tucker (1784–1851). During the Antebellum period The Novel also became a popular form of literary text often highlighting "historic Virginia settings and historic figures" where action and narrative was "set either on a Virginia antebellum plantation or in a crucial moment from Virginia history."

The period of the American Civil War provided an opportunity for literary development for women writers not only from Virginia but within the larger American South. Women "in response to the war that rocked their patriarchal society...wrote diaries, memoirs, poetry, and novels". The themes explored at this time were predominantly concerned with women's personal experiences of the War in the form of both fiction and non-fictional account. Other female Virginian writers include Mary Tucker Magill (Woman, or a Chronicle of the Late War, 1867), Myrta Lockett Avary (A Virginia Girl in the Civil War, 1903), Maie Dove Day (The Blended Flags), Susan Archer Tally and Marion Harland.

Marion Fontaine Cabell Tyree's Housekeeping in Old Virginia, a cookbook, was published in Richmond in 1878. In 1855 Sketches of Slave Life: Or, Illustrations of the Peculiar Institution was written by Peter Randolph an ex-Virginian Slave and noted abolitionist. He also wrote From Slave Cabin to the Pulpit in 1893. His narratives recorded the day-to-day hardships of slave life in Virginia, "relating how the lives of slaves were controlled by their masters and the laws of the land." Randolph's writing was part of a larger change of literary voices in Virginia's history as African American writers began to write to "assert themselves not only as human beings worthy of freedom and opportunity, but also as equals to whites, with the act of writing their stories being the first step in asserting that equality."

== Organizations and programs ==
The Virginia Writers Club was formed in November 1918 and currently has ten chapters. Its mission is to "support and stimulate the art, craft, and business of writing, as well as advocate the literary arts in the broader Virginia community". It has a diverse range of members of both published and unpublished writers, poets, journalists and essayists. They offer courses, contests and hold an annual writing symposium in Virginia.

The Poetry Society of Virginia formed in May 1923. According to their mission statement they "seek to promote the writing and enjoyment of poetry through a wide range of programs and monthly events, offered in seven regions across Virginia". Dr. Charles N. Feidelson, a professor of literature at Yale was appointed as the first president of the society. The current president is Terry Cox-Joseph. The Poetry Society of Virginia holds a festival in the third weekend in May each year and an annual poetry competition.

The Virginia Centre for the Book is a program developed through Virginia Humanities and seeks to "unite communities of readers, writers, artists, and book lovers through year-round programs and partnership initiatives...promoting books, reading, literacy, and the literary life of Virginia" The center is affiliated with University of Virginia and National Endowment for the Humanities, and holds public education initiatives, programs and workshops in an effort to encourage "all Virginians to develop a love of books and reading". The centre is also an affiliate of the Centre for the Book in the Library of Congress.

== Awards and events ==
The Virginia General Assembly created the position of Poet Laureate of Virginia in 1936. The position is currently held by Luisa Igloria, a professor of English and Creative Writing at Old Dominion University.

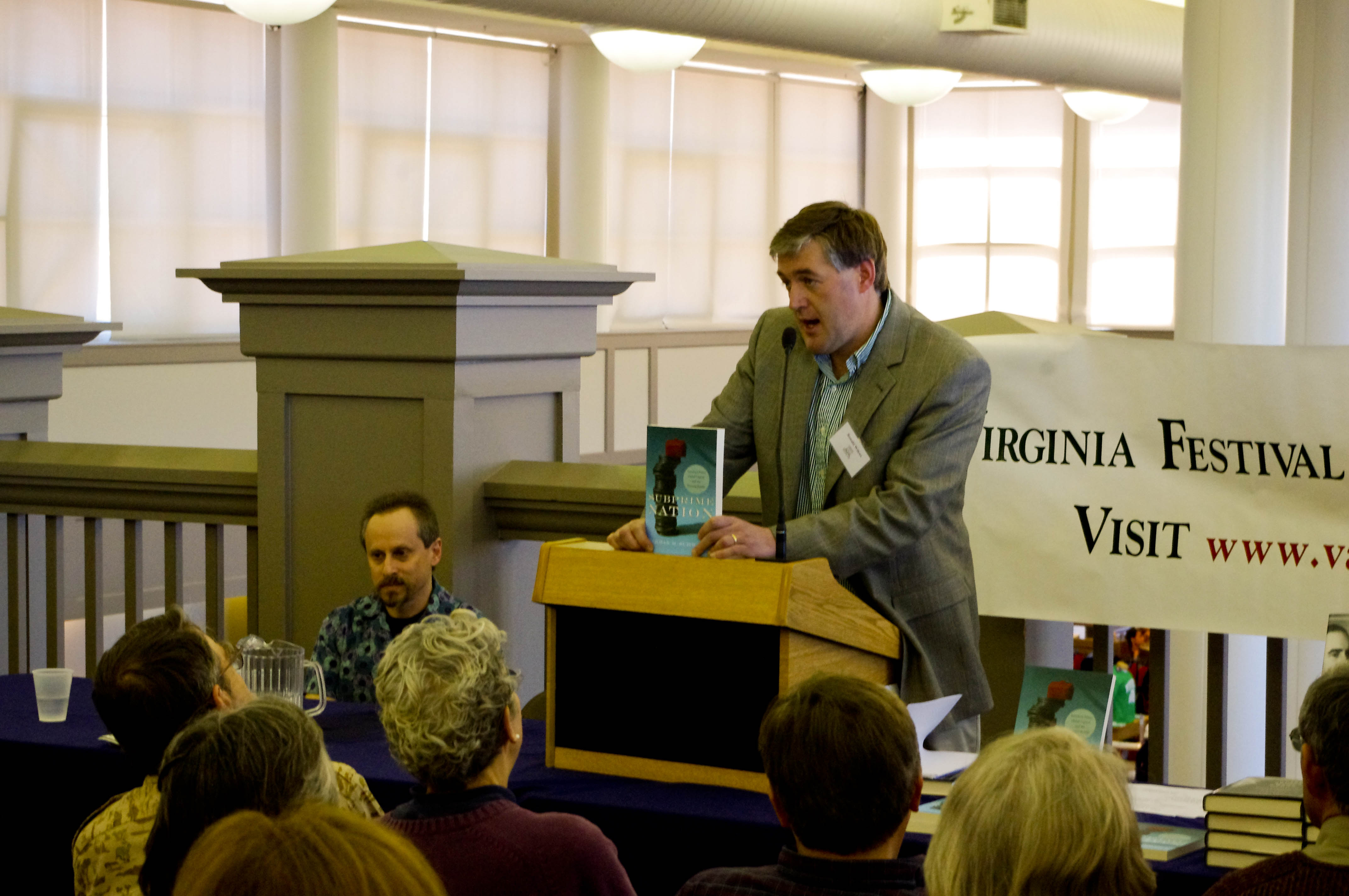
Herman M. Schwartz, Professor of Politics at The University of Virginia, speaks at The Virginia Festival of the Book in 2010.

The Library of Virginia established an annual literary awards program in 1997. Awards are given to Virginian writers in multiple categories including fiction, non-fiction and poetry and aims to honour and celebrate authors and their contributions to the field of Virginia literature. There are People's Choice Awards for Fiction and Nonfiction works. The library also awards a Literary Lifetime Achievement Award, acknowledging the outstanding achievement of one long-standing individual each year. Past winners of this award include Earl Hamner, Lee Smith, Tom Robbins, Charles Wright, Barbara Kingsolver, Rita Dove, John Grisham, Tom Wolfe, and David Baldacci.

Virginia currently holds an annual festival titled the 'Virginia Festival of the Book' which aims to support emerging and established writers by "bringing together writers and readers to promote and celebrate books, reading, literacy and literary culture". This initiative is organised by The Virginia Centre for the Book and is sponsored by The Joseph and Robert Cornell Memorial Foundation and supported by the University of Virginia. Other major partners include Dominion Energy, Bank of America, CFA Institute and Macmillan Publisher Services. Over twenty thousand people attend each year.

== Literary journals in Virginia ==
Name of journal	Place/institute of publication	Years active	Editor(s)	Notes
Artemis Journal	Roanoke Taubman Museum of Art, Roanoke VA	1977–present	Editorial staff: Founder and editor-in-chief: Jeri Rogers Associate editor: Julia Fallon Literary editors: Donnie Secreast, Adam Gnuse Distinguished poet, page turner, art editor: Nikki Giovanni Layout editor: Zephren Turner Poet liaison Va. Poetry Society: Angela Dribben Treasurer and legal advisor: Jonathan Rogers	Artemis journal seeks to showcase women's voices through the publishing of both poetry and prose and regularly includes both established and previously unpublished authors. It is a "charitable, non-profit organisation" sponsored by the Roanoke Arts Commission and The Taubman Museum of Art.
Blue Collar Review - Journal of Progressive Working Class Literature	Partisan Press Norfolk, VA	Unknown	Unknown	
Clinch Mountain Review	Southwest Virginia Community College, Richlands VA	Unknown	Editor: Russ Wood	
Hampden-Sydney Poetry Review	Hampden-Sydney College, Hampden-Sydney VA	1975–present	Editor: Nathaniel D. Perry (Elliott Professor of English and Editor of The Poetry Review)	
Meridian	University of Virginia, Charlottesville VA	1998–present	Editor in chief: Jeddie Sophronius Fiction editor: Nana Nyarko Boateng Nonfiction editor: Henrietta Hadley Associate poetry editor: Kaitlyn Airy	Meridian is published annually and is created in conjunction with the university's MFA in Creative Writing Program students who serve as the magazine's editors.
Sow's Ear Poetry Review	The Word Process, Winchester VA	1989–present	Managing editor: Sarah Kohrs	
The Hollins Critic	Hollins University, Roanoke VA	1963–present	Editor: Billy Faires	
Blackbird (formerly known as The New Virginia Review)	Virginia Commonwealth University Department of English Norfolk Va	1978–present Change of name 2002	Managing editor: Rebecca Poynor	Main contributors to the journal include graduate and undergraduate student interns, as well as MA and MFA Graduate Assistants from the VCU Department of English
The Northern Virginia Review	Northern Virginia Community College, Annandale VA	2013–present	Editor in chief: Ruth Stewart Associate editor: Jonathan Harvey	
The Red Brick Review (formerly known as The Virginia Normal)	Virginia State University Literary Journal, Petersburg VA	2013 (established) 2015 (first issue published) – present	Faculty editors: Michael McClure Claire Boswell Latorial Faison James Capozzi	Founded by members of Virginia State University's Department of Languages & Literature (home of the former historical literary journal TAPESTRY)
The Virginia Quarterly Review (VQR)	Centre for Media and Citizenship, University of Virginia, Charlottesville VA	1925–present	Director: Siva Vaidhyanathan Editor: Paul Reyes; Publisher and executive editor: Allison Wright; Art director: Jenn Boggs	

== See also ==
- Category:Writers from Virginia
- List of newspapers in Virginia
- Category:Virginia in fiction
- Category:Libraries in Virginia
- Southern United States literature
- American literary regionalism

== Bibliography ==
- Carl Holliday (1909). "Literature of Colonial Virginia". American Historical Magazine. 4. New York: National Americana Society. OCLC 4265190.
- Lucian Lamar Knight, ed. (1913). "Fifty Reading Courses: Virginia". Library of Southern Literature. Vol. 16. Atlanta: Martin and Hoyt Company. pp. 217–225. hdl:2027/uc1.31175034925258 – via HathiTrust.
- Elsie Dershem (1921). "Virginia". Outline of American State Literature. Lawrence, Kansas: World Company – via Internet Archive.
- Federal Writers' Project (1941), "Literature", Virginia: a Guide to the Old Dominion, American Guide Series, Oxford University Press, pp. 156–166, ISBN 9780403021956 – via Google Books
- Howard Mumford Jones (1946). "Literature of Virginia in the Seventeenth Century". Memoirs of the American Academy of Arts and Sciences. New series. 19 (2): 1–47. Bibcode:1946MAAAS..19....1J. doi:10.2307/25058511. hdl:2027/uva.x001249441. JSTOR 25058511.
- Leslie Bjorncrantz. A Checklist of Virginia Writers, Past and Present. Charlottesville, Va.: University of Virginia Library, 1970
- G. Thomas Tanselle (1971). Guide to the Study of United States Imprints. Harvard University Press. ISBN 978-0-674-36761-6. (Includes information about Virginia literature)
- Welford Dunaway Taylor. Virginia Authors, Past and Present. Richmond, Va.: Virginia Association of Teachers of English, 1972
- Richard Beale Davis. Literature and Society in Early Virginia 1608–1840. Baton Rouge, La.: Louisiana State University Press, 1973
- Della Anderson. 101 Virginia Women Writers: A Select Bibliography. Richmond, Va.: Virginia Women's Cultural History Project, 1984
- George C. Longest (2001). "Literature of Virginia". In Joseph M. Flora; Lucinda Hardwick MacKethan (eds.). Companion to Southern Literature: Themes, Genres, Places, People, Movements, and Motifs. Louisiana State University Press. p. 940+. ISBN 978-0-8071-2692-9.
- Sarah Huggins (2003), Researching Virginia Authors (PDF), Research Guides, Richmond, VA: Library of Virginia. (Subject guide)
- Kevin J. Hayes, ed. (2015). History of Virginia Literature. Cambridge University Press. ISBN 978-1-107-05777-7.
