= Ron Smith (American poet) =

American poet (born 1949)

- Born: 1949 (age 76–77); Savannah, Georgia, U.S.
- Education: University of Richmond; Virginia Commonwealth University
- Occupation: Poet

Ron Smith (born 1949) is an American poet and the first writer-in-residence at St. Christopher's School in Richmond, Virginia.

He is the author of Running Again in Hollywood Cemetery, Moon Road, Its Ghostly Workshop, and The Humility of the Brutes. In 2005, he was selected, along with Elizabeth Seydel Morgan, as an inaugural winner of the Carole Weinstein Poetry Prize, "which is awarded each year to a poet with strong connections to the Commonwealth of Virginia." He serves as a curator for the prize along with Morgan, David Wojahn, and Don Selby.

Smith's poems have appeared in periodicals, including The Nation, The Kenyon Review, New England Review, and in anthologies from Wesleyan University Press, Time-Life Books, University of Virginia Press, University of Georgia Press, and University of Illinois Press.

His essay-reviews have appeared in The Kenyon Review and other magazines and reference works, most recently in The Georgia Review, Blackbird: An Online Journal of Literature and the Arts, and H-Arete. He is a regular poetry reviewer for the Richmond Times-Dispatch.

Smith is a former president of the Poetry Society of Virginia, and is a trustee for the Edgar Allan Poe Museum. He sits on the board of directors for James River Writers.

From 2014 to 2016, he was Poet Laureate of Virginia.

== Life ==
Born in Savannah, Georgia, Smith moved to Richmond, Virginia, to play college football. He holds degrees (B.A., M.A., M.H., M.F.A.) from the University of Richmond and Virginia Commonwealth University in philosophy, English, general humanities, and creative writing. He studied creative writing at Bennington College in Vermont, British drama at Worcester College, Oxford, and Renaissance and modern culture and literature at the Ezra Pound Center for Literature in Meran, Italy.

He teaches creative writing (poetry, fiction, drama), twentieth-century American poetry, and has taught the life and works of Edgar Allan Poe at Mary Washington College, Virginia Commonwealth University, and the University of Richmond.

Ron Smith was the Writer in Residence at St. Christopher's School

== Works ==
=== Poetry books ===
- 1988: Running Again in Hollywood Cemetery, called "a close second" by Margaret Atwood, judge for the National Poetry Series Open Competition; also a runner-up for the Samuel French Morse Prize; title poem awarded Southern Poetry Review's Guy Owen Award by judge Linda Pastanlater; published by University Presses of Florida; ISBN 978-0-8130-0881-3
- 2007: Moon Road: Poems 1986-2005, Louisiana State University Press, 72 pp, ISBN 978-0-8071-3271-5
- 2013: Its Ghostly Workshop, Louisiana State University Press, ISBN 978-0-8071-5033-7
- 2017: The Humility of the Brutes, Louisiana State University Press, ISBN 978-0-8071-6656-7
- 2020: Running Again in Hollywood Cemetery (2nd edition), MadHat Press, ISBN 978-1-941196-90-8
- 2023: That Beauty in the Trees, Louisiana State University Press, ISBN 978-0-8071-7798-3

=== Other poetry ===
His 18-poem sequence "To Ithaca" appeared in the Summer 2002 issue of The Georgia Review.

== Awards and recognitions ==
His awards and honors include:

- Poet Laureate of Virginia, 2014–16
- Theodore Roethke Poetry Prize from Poetry Northwest
- Guy Owen Poetry Prize
- Virginia Center for the Creative Arts Fellowship
