= Kelly Cherry =

American writer and poet laureate (1940–2022)

- Born: Kelly Cherry; December 21, 1940; Baton Rouge, Louisiana, U.S.
- Died: March 18, 2022 (aged 81); Halifax, Virginia, U.S.
- Education: University of Mary Washington; University of Virginia; University of North Carolina at Greensboro (MFA)
- Occupations: Poet; author; essayist
- Spouse: Burke Davis III
- Writing career
- Notable works: Quartet for J. Robert Oppenheimer (poems); Twelve Women in a Country Called America: Stories; A Kind of Dream; Girl in a Library: On Women Writers & the Writing Life; Hazard and Prospect: New and Selected Poems; The Retreats of Thought
- Notable awards: Poet Laureate of Virginia (2010–12)

Kelly Cherry (December 21, 1940 – March 18, 2022) was an American novelist, poet, essayist, professor, and literary critic and a former Poet Laureate of Virginia (2010–2012). She was the author of more than 30 books, including the poetry collections Songs for a Soviet Composer, Death and Transfiguration, Rising Venus and The Retreats of Thought. Her short fiction was reprinted in The Best American Short Stories, Prize Stories: The O. Henry Awards, The Pushcart Prize, and New Stories from the South, and won a number of awards.

== Life ==
Cherry was born in Baton Rouge, Louisiana, to J. Milton, a violinist and music professor, and Mary Spooner, a violinist and writer. She moved to Ithaca, New York, at age 5, and Chesterfield County, Virginia, at age 9.

She received her bachelor's degree from Mary Washington College in 1961 and an MFA in 1967 from the University of North Carolina at Greensboro. She married Jonathan Silver in 1966 and divorced him in 1969. She later married Walter Burke Davis III, a writer, journalist and bookseller.

Cherry died on March 18, 2022, at the age of 81. The editors of storySouth dedicated the magazine's spring 2022 issue to her for her support of "all the little magazines."

== Career ==
=== Early career ===
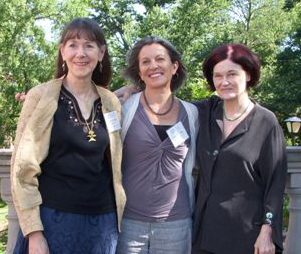
Virginia Poets Laureate at University of Mary Washington Reunion Day, June 3, 2011. Carolyn Kreiter-Foronda (2006-2008), Claudia Emerson (2008-2010) and Kelly Cherry (2010-2012)

Cherry graduated from the University of Mary Washington in 1961, did graduate work at the University of Virginia in philosophy as a Du Pont Fellow, and received a Master of Fine Arts from the University of North Carolina at Greensboro. After working in publishing for some years, she accepted a position at Southwest Minnesota State College. She began teaching at the University of Wisconsin–Madison in 1977. Cherry later became the Eudora Welty Professor Emerita of English and Evjue-Bascom Professor Emerita in the Humanities at the University of Wisconsin–Madison.

=== Later career ===
Cherry retired in 1999 and in retirement held chairs and distinguished writer positions at a number of universities, including the University of Alabama in Huntsville (Eminent Scholar), Colgate University, Mercer University, Atlantic Center for the Arts, and Hollins University.

A resident of Halifax, Virginia, she was named the state's Poet Laureate by Governor Bob McDonnell in July 2010. She succeeded Claudia Emerson in this post (Poet Laureate of Virginia, 2008–2010).

== Literary themes and styles ==
Cherry's poetry frequently focused on issues related to philosophy and language, and has been described as trying to "discover within the art of poetry methods and procedures identical to, or closely analogous with, those of a science or a rigorous formal philosophy." Or as Cherry described it, "the becoming-aware of abstraction in real life--since, in order to abstract, you must have something to abstract from."

Within her novels, the abstract notions of morality become her focus: "My novels deal with moral dilemmas and the shapes they create as they reveal themselves in time. My poems seek out the most suitable temporal or kinetic structure for a given emotion." As described in Contemporary Authors, Cherry "manages to capture, in very readable stories, the indecisiveness and mute desperation of life in the twentieth century."

From the beginning of her career, Cherry wrote both formal verse and free verse. According to the citation preceding her receipt of the James G. Hanes Poetry Prize by the Fellowship of Southern Writers in 1989, "Her poetry is marked by a firm intellectual passion, a reverent desire to possess the genuine thought of our century, historical, philosophical, and scientific, and a species of powerful ironic wit which is allied to rare good humor." Reviewing Relativity, Patricia Goedicke noted in Three Rivers Poetry Journal that "her familiarity with the demands and pressures of traditional patterns has resulted...in an expansion and deepening of her poetic resources, a carefully textured over- and underlay of image, meaning and diction." Mark Harris felt that Cherry's "ability to sustain a narrative by clustering and repeating images [lends] itself to longer forms, and 'A Bird's Eye View of Einstein,' the longest poem in [Relativity], is an example of Cherry at her poetic best." Reviewing Cherry's collection, Death and Transfiguration, Patricia Gabilondo wrote in The Anglican Theological Review that "the abstract prose poem 'Requiem' that closes this book...translates personal loss into the historical and universal, providing an occasion for philosophical meditation on the mystery of suffering and the need for transcendence in a post-Holocaust world that seems to offer none. Moving through the terrors of nihilism and doubt, Cherry, in a poem that deftly alternates between the philosophically abstract and the image's graphic force, gives us an intellectually honest and deeply moving vision of our relation to each other's suffering and of God's relation to humanity's 'memory of pain'."

== Teaching positions in retirement ==
- Rivers-Coffey Distinguished Chair, Appalachian State University
- Louis D. Rubin, Jr., Writer-in-Residence, Hollins University
- Master Artist, Atlantic Center for the Arts
- Ferrol A. Sams, Jr., Distinguished Chair in English, Mercer University
- NEH Visiting professor in the Humanities, Colgate University
- Eminent Scholar, University of Alabama in Huntsville, 1999-2004

== While at the University of Wisconsin ==
- Wyndham Robertson Writer-in-Residence, Hollins University
- Distinguished Professor, Rhodes College
- Full Professor and Distinguished Writer-in-Residence, Western Washington University

== Other positions and posts include ==
- Member, Electorate, Cathedral of St. John the Divine, NYC (five-year term beginning 2009; extended to 2016; now Electorate Emeritus)
- Associated Writing Programs Board of Directors (1990–93)
- Discipline Advisory Committee for Fulbright Awards (1991–94)
- Advisory Editor, Shenandoah (1988–92)
- Contributing Editor, The Hollins Critic (1996–present)
- Contributing Editor, The Smart Set (2015–present)

== Bibliography ==
=== Novels ===
- Sick and full of burning. New York: Viking Press. 1974.
  - Reprinted: Ballantine (1975); Boson Books (1995)
- Augusta Played, Houghton Mifflin, (1979), ISBN 978-0-395-27573-3; Louisiana State University Press, (1984). A novel.
- In the Wink of an Eye. Harcourt Brace Jovanovich. 1983. ISBN 9780151446568.: A novel. LSU Press, 2004. ISBN 978-0-8071-2966-1
- The Lost Traveller's Dream, Harcourt Brace Jovanovich, (1984) ISBN 978-0-15-153617-7. A novel.
- My Life and Dr. Joyce Brothers. A novel in stories. Algonquin Books of Chapel Hill, (1990); reprinted by University of Alabama Press, (2002).
- We Can Still Be Friends, Soho Press, (2003) hardback; (2004) trade paper, ISBN 978-1-56947-323-8. A novel.

=== Short fiction ===
- Conversion, Treacle Press, (1979) ISBN 978-0-914232-28-5. A story.
- The Society of Friends: Stories, University of Missouri Press, (1999) ISBN 978-0-8262-1243-6
- The Woman Who. Boson Books (2010), Bitingduck Press. Short stories.
- A Kind of Dream. Interlinked short stories, U. of Wisconsin Press, spring 2014. ISBN 978-0299297602
- Twelve Women in a Country Called America: Stories. Press 53, May 2015. ISBN 978-1-941209-19-6
- Temporium: Before the Beginning To After the End: Fictions. Press 53. October, 2017.

=== Nonfiction ===
- The Exiled Heart. LSU Press. 1991. ISBN 978-0-8071-1620-3.
- The Globe and the Brain: On Place in Fiction, Talking River Publications, Lewis-Clark State College, (2006) ISBN 978-0-911015-54-6
- Writing the World. University of Missouri Press. 1995. ISBN 978-0-8262-0992-4.
- History, Passion, Freedom, Death, and Hope: Prose about Poetry, University of Tampa Press, (2005) ISBN 978-1-879852-26-6
- The Poem: An Essay, Sandhills Press, 1999
- Girl in a Library: On Women Writers and the Writing Life, BkMk Press/University of Missouri-Kansas City, 2009, ISBN 978-1-886157-66-8

=== Poetry ===
Collections

- Beholder's Eye, poems. Groundhog Poetry Press, 2017.
- Weather, poems. A chapbook. N.Y.: Rain Mountain Press, 2017.
- Quartet for J. Robert Oppenheimer: A Poem. (In shorter poems.) LSU Press, February 2017.
- Physics for Poets: Poems. Unicorn Press, spring 2015
- The Life and Death of Poetry: Poems, LSU Press, March 2013
- Vectors: J. Robert Oppenheimer: The Years before the Bomb, Parallel Press, 2012
- The Retreats of Thought: Poems. LSU Press. 2009. ISBN 978-0-8071-3478-8.
- Death and Transfiguration. LSU Press. 1997. ISBN 978-0-8071-2212-9.
- Benjamin John, March Street Press, 1993, ISBN 978-1-882983-01-8
- Hazard and Prospect: New and Selected Poems. LSU Press. 2007. ISBN 978-0-8071-3262-3.
- Natural Theology, Louisiana State University Press, 1988, ISBN 978-0-8071-1430-8
- Lovers and Agnostics, Carnegie Mellon University Press, 1995, ISBN 9780887482083
- An Other Woman, Somers Rocks Press, 2000
- God's Loud Hand. LSU Press. 1993. ISBN 978-0-8071-1821-4.
- Songs for a Soviet Composer, Singing Wind Press, 1980, ISBN 978-0-935896-02-2
- Rising Venus. LSU Press. 2002. ISBN 978-0-8071-2768-1.
- Time Out of Mind, March Street Press, 1994, ISBN 978-1-882983-08-7
- Relativity: A Point of View, Louisiana State University Press, 1977, ISBN 978-0-8071-0277-0
- Welsh Table Talk, The Book Arts Conservatory, 2004

List of poems

Title	Year	First published	Reprinted/collected
Field notes	1997	Cherry, Kelly (July 1997). "Field notes". The Atlantic Monthly. 280 (1): 56.	

=== Other ===
- A Kelly Cherry Reader. TX: Stephen F. Austin State University Press, 2015. Intro by Fred Chappell. Stories, novel excerpts, essays (familiar, instructive), eight poems.

=== Translations ===
- Antigone (trans.), in Sophocles, 2, ed. by Slavitt and Bovie
- Octavia (trans.), in Seneca: The Tragedies, Vol. 2, ed. Slavitt and Bovie

=== Publications in Prize Anthologies ===
- Best American Short Stories (1972)
- Prize Stories: The O. Henry Award (1994)
- The Pushcart Prize (1977)
- New Stories from the South (1989, 2009)

== Honors, awards and fellowships ==
=== Honors ===
- 2010–12 Poet Laureate of Virginia

=== Awards ===
- 2017 The William "Singing Billy" Walker Award for Lifetime Achievement in Southern Letters
- 2016 Lifetime Achievement Award from the University of North Carolina at Greensboro
- 2015 Finalist, Library of Virginia Fiction Award for A Kind of Dream: Stories.
- 2015 Selected by LJ among 30 Top Indie Fiction titles.
- 2013 L. E. Phillabaum Poetry Award
- 2012 Carole Weinstein Poetry Prize
- 2012 Rebecca Mitchell Taramuto Short Fiction Prize for "On Familiar Terms," Blackbird at www.blackbird.vcu.edu
- 2011 The Bravo!Award by the Chesterfield Public Education Foundation, Chesterfield County Public Schools in Virginia, USA
- 2010 Finalist, People's Choice Awards, Library of Virginia, for Girl in a Library: On Women Writers & the Writing Life
- 2010 Director's Visitor, Institute for Advanced Study, Princeton, New Jersey
- 2010 The Ellen Anderson Award (first recipient) from the Poetry Society of Virginia
- 2009 Finalist (with Marvin Bell and Mark Jarman) for The Poets' Prize
- 2009 Finalist, Book of the Year Award, ForeWord Magazine, nonfiction, for Girl in a Library: On Women Writers and the Writing Life
- 2002 Book of the Year Award by ForeWord Magazine, Silver Prize for Poetry, for Rising Venus.
- 2000 Bradley Major Achievement Award (Lifetime), Council for Wisconsin Writers
- 2000 Distinguished Alumnus Award, University of Mary Washington
- 2000 Dictionary of Literary Biography Award for the best volume of short stories (The Society of Friends: Stories) published in 1999
- 1999 Leidig Lectureship in Poetry, Emory & Henry College
- 1992 USIS Arts America Speaker Award (The Philippines). USIS is now called the USIA
- 1992, 1991 Wisconsin Arts Board New Work Awards
- 1991 VCCA Writers Exchange Fellow (with Edwin Honig et al.) to Russia (Leningrad, Peredelkino, Yalta)
- 1991 First Prize for Book-length Fiction, Council for Wisconsin Writers (for My Life and Dr. Joyce Brothers)
- 1991 Wisconsin Notable Author, Literary Committee of the Wisconsin Library Association
- 1990, 1987, 1983 PEN Syndicated Fiction Awards
- 1989 Hanes Poetry Prize given by the Fellowship of Southern Writers for a body of work, first recipient.
- 1980 First Prize for Book-length Fiction, Council for Wisconsin Writers (for Augusta Played)
- 1974 Canaras Award for first novel, Sick and Full of Burning

=== Fellowships ===
- 2009 Rockefeller Foundation Fellowship, US
- 2005 Fellow, Le Moulin à Nef, Auvillar, France
- 1997 WARF Award (Eudora Welty Chair)
- 1993 Bascom Award (Evjue-Bascom Chair)
- 1994 Hawthornden Residency Fellowship, Scotland
- 1991, 1988, 1984 Wisconsin Arts Board Fellowships, US
- 1989, 1979 Fellow, Yaddo
- 1986 Fellow, The Ragdale Foundation, US
- 1984 UW Chancellor's Award
- 1983 UW Romnes Fellowship
- 1979 National Endowment for the Arts Fellowship, US
- 1978 Fellow, Virginia Center for the Creative Arts, USA. Also, 1985; 1986; December–January 1987/1988; 1989; December–February 1990/1991; 2003; 2004; 2007; 2011 (Weinstein Fellow); June 13-July 14, 2013
- 1975 Allan Collins Fellowship, Bread Loaf, US
