= Christiansburg, Virginia =

Town in Montgomery County, Virginia, USA

- Town
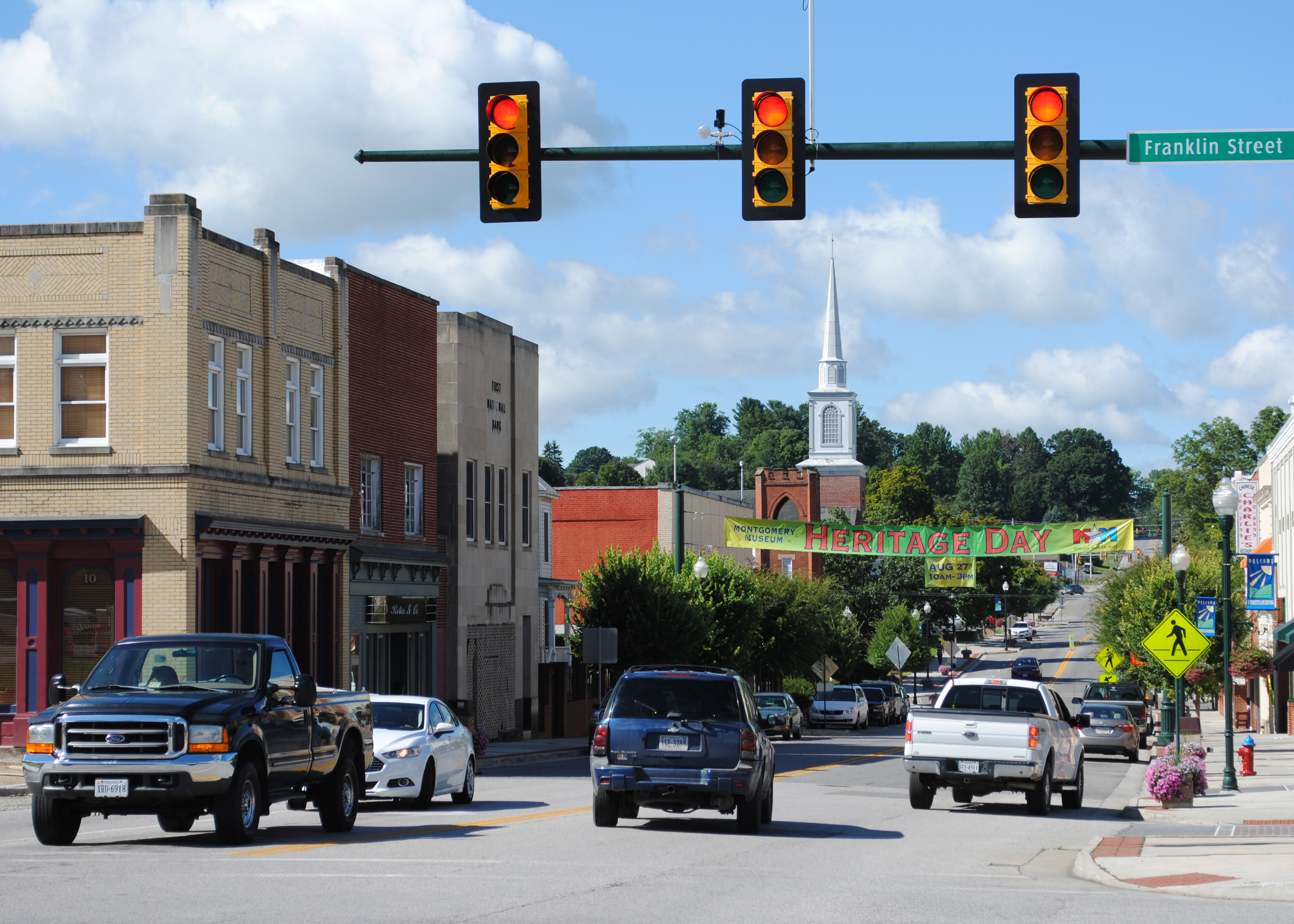
- Downtown Christiansburg

- Flag Seal
- Motto: The Place to be!
- Location within Virginia Location within the United States
- Coordinates: 37°8′28″N 80°24′28″W
- Country: United States
- State: Virginia
- County: Montgomery
- Founded: November 10, 1792
- Incorporated: January 7, 1833
- Named for: William Christian

Government
  - Mayor: D. Michael Barber

Area
  - Total: 14.64 sq mi (37.93 km^{2})
  - Land: 14.62 sq mi (37.87 km^{2})
  - Water: 0.027 sq mi (0.07 km^{2})
- Elevation: 2,133 ft (650 m)

Population (2020)
  - Total: 23,348
  - Density: 1,537/sq mi (593.5/km^{2})
- Demonym: Christiansburger
- Time zone: UTC−5 (EST)
  - Summer (DST): UTC−4 (EDT)
- ZIP codes: 24068, 24073
- Area code: 540
- FIPS code: 51-16608
- GNIS feature ID: 1498467
- Website: https://www.christiansburg.org/

Christiansburg (formerly Hans Meadows) is a town in the southwestern portion of Montgomery County, Virginia, United States. It has served as the seat of government for the county since 1792, when it was formally recognized by the Virginia General Assembly. Christiansburg is contiguously bordered on its north by the only other incorporated town in Montgomery County, Blacksburg. Christiansburg (and Blacksburg) are situated on the Eastern Continental Divide in the Appalachian Mountains.

The economy of Christiansburg and Blacksburg are dominated by the presence of Virginia Tech (located inside the town of Blacksburg) by far the largest employer in the county.

Christiansburg's population was 23,348 at the 2020 census, up from 21,041 at the 2010 census. Christiansburg and Blacksburg are the principal municipalities of the Blacksburg–Christiansburg metropolitan area which also encompasses the city of Radford, the unincorporated areas of Montgomery County, plus all of Giles and Pulaski Counties. The 2020 census recorded that the population of the Blacksburg-Christiansburg metropolitan area was 181,854, ranked 238th of the 387 uniquely defined metropolitan areas in the United States.

== History ==
=== European discovery, founding (1671–1792) ===
In 1671, Abraham Wood commissioned the first English expedition to cross the Eastern Continental Divide. The members of that expedition included Thomas Wood, Thomas Batts (Batte) and Robert Fallamto. The expedition is now known as the Batts and Fallam Expedition. The exploration party reached what is now the New River Valley and the New River. The site of discovery of the northerly-running river is believed to be where the Little River enters the New River just north of what is now the Claytor Lake Dam. This is about 10 miles from the center of Christiansburg.

Along the river, there were several Native American encampments, and conflicts were common between those tribes and the early settlers. As settlers began moving into present-day Christiansburg, they discovered that area was also inhabited by the Shawnee and other Native American tribes, who had discovered the river some years prior.

In the late 1600s, Dutch priest Friar Hans arrived in the region; it was named Hans Meadow after him in the early 1700s.

In the 18th century, the region was settled by pioneers from Pennsylvania and eastern Virginia. In 1776, Montgomery County was formed from part of Fincastle County. The City of Radford, as well as parts of Floyd, Giles and Pulaski counties, were all subsequently formed from Montgomery County land.

The town of "Christiansburgh" – as it was originally spelled – was named in honor of Colonel William Christian, who was an early settler in the region. He was one of the first justices of Fincastle County, a member of the Virginia Legislature, and brother-in-law of Patrick Henry. Theodore Roosevelt, in his history The Winning of the West, later wrote that Colonel Christian was a "noted Indian fighter" and a "very gallant and honorable man."

Developing from a concentration of taverns and rest stops along the Great Wagon Road (present-day U.S. Route 11), the original 1.1-square mile town was established on November 10, 1792, by an act passed by the Virginia General Assembly. The town of Christiansburg was later incorporated on January 7, 1833.

=== Notable early settlers ===
George Washington was known to have visited Christiansburg during the early years of settlement.

Frontiersman Daniel Boone resided in town for a time. Among records in the County Courthouse is a warrant dated 1774 for the arrest of Boone on a debt charge. The warrant was issued under King George's name but marked "Not executed – Gone to Kentucky." Boone later repaid the debt.

Davy Crockett lived in Christiansburg and served as an apprentice to a local newspaper printer for a short time. Crockett also worked at John Snider's Hattery Shop, located on W. Main Street, for 18 months.

William Clark, of the famous Lewis and Clark Expedition, resided in Christiansburg. He lived in downtown Christiansburg in the existing house at 109 E. Main Street, which is commonly known as the Montague home. Meriwether Lewis also visited Christiansburg on occasion.

=== Early years (1793–1860) ===
Christiansburg experienced significant growth in the early 1800s, and by 1840, the population had grown to 400.

Most residential growth was confined to Main Street and Cross Street (now Franklin Street). Several industrial complexes developed around the Gardner Zink Mill west of town and the Chrisman Mill along Crab Creek (on what is now State Route 661/Chrisman Mill Road). These two mills were responsible for the centralization of a number of area milling operations in the late 1700s.

New streets were laid out during the early 1800s, and additional construction included a number of churches and a public well and pumps, which were placed just north of the Courthouse in 1826. Ten years later, a public privy was built near the public square, and a new courthouse was constructed in March 1836 in the east corner of the public square. The Christiansburg (Cambria) Depot in the community of Cambria was established on the Virginia Tennessee Railroad line in 1854.

Downtown Christiansburg was the site of the Lewis-McHenry Duel on May 9, 1808. The rifle duel between Thomas Lewis and John McHenry, which killed both men, led to the passage of the Barbour Bill in 1810, outlawing dueling in Virginia. Former town resident Dr. John Floyd was the attending surgeon at the Lewis-McHenry duel and later governor of Virginia, as well as a member of Congress. He was also the father of John Buchanan Floyd, who served as governor of Virginia from 1849 to 1852.

Pennsylvanian artist Lewis Miller was fascinated with Montgomery County's scenery, and throughout the 1830s through the 1850s, he often stayed in Christiansburg to depict town scenes. After the Civil War, Miller retired to Christiansburg and spent his last 20 years living with relatives and friends. The Montgomery Museum and Lewis Miller Regional Art Center, located at 300 Pepper Street SE, is named for him.

=== Civil War through late 19th century (1861–1899) ===
During the Civil War, many men from the Christiansburg area served in the Confederate army in the Shenandoah Valley under General T.J. "Stonewall" Jackson . Christiansburg was invaded several times by Union Forces operating under W.W. Averell, and in 1864, the Union Army burned all of the Christiansburg Depot structures except the passenger station.

Confederate forces were active within the Christiansburg area and occupied a number of buildings in and around the town. The Lattimer Plantation, which once stood on the Christiansburg High School site, was used as a Confederate headquarters. The nearby Montgomery White Sulphur Springs resort in Ellett Valley was utilized as a hospital from 1861 to 1865.

Near the end of the war, Union General George B. Stoneman and his men were in Christiansburg and had established headquarters in the Rice D. Montague home, which still stands at 109 E. Main Street. His men were stationed there when news came of Confederate General Robert E. Lee's surrender at Appomattox.

Following the Civil War, the population of Christiansburg experienced a decline that continued throughout the 19th century. In 1870, there were 864 people in the town, and by 1900, there were only 659.

=== Christiansburg Institute ===
Captain Charles S. Schaeffer, an agent of the Freedmen's Bureau, founded the Christiansburg Normal Institute (renamed the Christiansburg Industrial Institute) in 1866. The school was formed as a private primary school for the education of black children and was located on Zion Hill, between the town and the old Christiansburg (Cambria) Depot.

Booker T. Washington served as superintendent of the institute from 1896 until his death in 1915 and was instrumental in expanding the curriculum to include both classical instruction and practical instruction in industry and the trades. The school was relocated to Lattimer Plantation in 1898 and was significantly expanded in the following years, growing to 14 buildings and 185 acres. George Washington Carver and other members of the Tuskegee University staff visited CII, and prominent industrial engineer John Wines Lester lived on the CII campus.

The Institute came under lease by the Montgomery County School System in 1935. The property was transferred to Montgomery County Schools in 1947, establishing it as a full-fledged public school. The Christiansburg Institute was the first black high school in southwestern Virginia and was also the first high school in Montgomery County to receive accreditation with the Virginia Public School System. It remained in operation as a segregated high school until 1966 when desegregation brought its closure.

=== Early 20th century (1900–1945) ===
By the early 1900s, Christiansburg had taken on many of the functions of a regional center, with a bank, newspaper, Temperance Hall and photographer. Telephone service was provided by the Montgomery Intelligence Company, which was incorporated in 1886. Agriculture played an important part in the local and regional economy, and livestock were regularly driven to market down Main Street or taken to the Christiansburg Depot.

A fire following a temperance march in 1900 destroyed several buildings along West Main Street in the downtown area. Despite this fire, Christiansburg experienced vigorous growth in the first decade of the 20th century, growing from 659 persons in 1900 to 1,568 in 1910. The success of the Norfolk and Western Railroad's Christiansburg Depot, which served as the main shipping point for much of Montgomery County, contributed to much of this growth. Several new houses were built between the town center and the Depot, and the Depot area community was eventually incorporated as the town of Cambria in 1906.

The completion of U.S. Route 11 – the first interstate highway in America – was celebrated in Christiansburg when the last link passing through downtown was hard surfaced in 1926. By 1929, Virginia Polytechnic Institute was providing employment for the area's citizens through academic positions and mining jobs related to the school's coal-operated power plant.

The depression years were notable for Christiansburg for an unusual reason: Christiansburg's Post Office was one of approximately two dozen locations in Virginia to receive Mural American Artwork or sculptures, which were created through Roosevelt's Works Project Administration. Christiansburg's mural is entitled Great Road and was completed in 1938 by John DeGroot.

=== Post–World War II (1946–1965) ===
Following World War II, Christiansburg rapidly industrialized. The Southern Dairies Plant (which later became a part of Sealtest) opened, and The Roberts' Motel – the first of its kind in Southwestern Virginia – also debuted after the war. Virginia Tech continued to expand, and by the mid-1950s, the school owned 2,000 acres in Montgomery County and employed more than 1,400 individuals. In 1953, the Starlite Drive-In opened and continues to operate as one of the few remaining drive-in theatres in the United States.

The 1950s were most noted for the number of devastating fires that occurred in town. In 1954, Roses' 5&10 and Cavalier Furniture were both destroyed. Catastrophe struck again in 1956, destroying most of the businesses on East Main Street. In a single fire, the town lost the City Market, Royal Cafe, Smith & Jones, Jennings Barber Shop and Interiors by Richard. Fires in 1957 claimed Simmons Shoe Shop, the Blue Moon Lunch and the rebuilt Jennings Barber Shop. A major fire on Main Street (now Cambria Street, N.E.) in Cambria in 1959 destroyed many of the oldest and most historic buildings there.

Having lost most of its taxpaying enterprises and faced with failing utilities, the town of Cambria proposed and was accepted for consolidation with the Town of Christiansburg on December 31, 1965.

=== Modernization (1966–present) ===
The town of Christiansburg continued to grow in the 1970s and 1980s, and two annexations added approximately 3,799 residents. A 1988 annexation incorporated Belmont Farms, the New River Valley Mall (which was under construction on the effective date), what had been the Virginia Tech Horticulture Farm (on the northern end of town) and the top of Christiansburg Mountain (on the eastern end of town).

The town underwent two boundary adjustments in the 1990s, which incorporated the Falling Branch Industrial Park and a portion of the Marketplace shopping center and the Christiansburg Industrial Park.

In 2000, the Spradlin Farms area began development, providing an additional retail space to the town. In 2002, a large portion of both Blacksburg and Christiansburg, as well as a portion of Montgomery County, were designated as a part of an "urbanized area" based upon 2000 Census figures.

In 2007, the New River Center was constructed just north of the New River Valley Mall, which added another large retail development to the town. Also in 2007, the town of Christiansburg and Montgomery County agreed to an adjustment, which brought 49.816 acres and approximately 66 persons into Town (with one single-family house and Wheatland Retirement Community accounting for the population). In a 2009 boundary adjustment, the town added the area of the Christiansburg Middle School, Harkrader Sports Complex and former Harkrader Farm, which brought in 170.318 acres and approximately six residents.

A "friendly sign war" between local businesses in the community went viral in 2021.

== Geography ==
Christiansburg is located at 37°5′28″N 80°24′28″W (37.141164, −80.407700). Christiansburg is situated on the Eastern Continental Divide in the Appalachian Mountains.

According to the United States Census Bureau, the town has a total area of 14.3 square miles.

The town is located at the crossroads of three major highways: Interstate 81, U.S. Route 460 and U.S. Route 11. I-81 forms the primary north–south thoroughfare from Maryland to Tennessee; U.S. Route 460 links Christiansburg with the town of Blacksburg, approximately a half mile to the north; and U.S. Route 11 provides a direct connection with the City of Radford, approximately 10 miles to the west. U.S. Routes 11 and 460 dually connect Christiansburg to Roanoke to the northeast.

Christiansburg is one of two incorporated towns within Montgomery County and is a member of the New River Valley Planning District. This District encompasses Floyd, Giles, Montgomery and Pulaski Counties, as well as the City of Radford. Montgomery County has the largest and most rapidly growing population within the Planning District.

=== Climate ===
Climate data for Christiansburg, Virginia (1991–2020)
Month	Jan	Feb	Mar	Apr	May	Jun	Jul	Aug	Sep	Oct	Nov	Dec	Year
Mean daily maximum °F (°C)	41.5 (5.3)	44.8 (7.1)	52.7 (11.5)	63.6 (17.6)	71.3 (21.8)	78.1 (25.6)	81.6 (27.6)	80.7 (27.1)	75.1 (23.9)	65.0 (18.3)	54.8 (12.7)	45.0 (7.2)	62.9 (17.1)
Daily mean °F (°C)	32.5 (0.3)	35.3 (1.8)	42.3 (5.7)	52.3 (11.3)	60.4 (15.8)	68.0 (20.0)	71.7 (22.1)	70.5 (21.4)	64.5 (18.1)	53.9 (12.2)	44.0 (6.7)	36.2 (2.3)	52.6 (11.5)
Mean daily minimum °F (°C)	23.4 (−4.8)	25.8 (−3.4)	31.9 (−0.1)	41.0 (5.0)	49.6 (9.8)	57.9 (14.4)	61.8 (16.6)	60.3 (15.7)	53.9 (12.2)	42.8 (6.0)	33.3 (0.7)	27.4 (−2.6)	42.4 (5.8)
Average precipitation inches (mm)	3.19 (81)	2.78 (71)	3.69 (94)	3.47 (88)	4.69 (119)	4.07 (103)	4.13 (105)	3.37 (86)	3.73 (95)	2.93 (74)	2.84 (72)	3.23 (82)	42.12 (1,070)
Average snowfall inches (cm)	6.3 (16)	6.6 (17)	3.7 (9.4)	0.3 (0.76)	0.0 (0.0)	0.0 (0.0)	0.0 (0.0)	0.0 (0.0)	0.0 (0.0)	0.0 (0.0)	0.4 (1.0)	4.4 (11)	21.7 (55.16)
Source: NOAA

== Demographics ==
Historical population
Census	Pop.	Note	%±
1850	532		—
1860	739		38.9%
1870	864		16.9%
1880	766		−11.3%
1900	659		—
1910	1,568		137.9%
1920	1,641		4.7%
1930	1,970		20.0%
1940	2,299		16.7%
1950	2,967		29.1%
1960	3,653		23.1%
1970	7,857		115.1%
1980	10,345		31.7%
1990	15,004		45.0%
2000	16,947		12.9%
2010	21,041		24.2%
2020	23,348		11.0%
U.S. Decennial Census

=== 2020 census ===
As of the 2020 census, Christiansburg had a population of 23,348. The median age was 36.7 years. 20.7% of residents were under the age of 18 and 15.9% of residents were 65 years of age or older. For every 100 females there were 94.1 males, and for every 100 females age 18 and over there were 91.3 males age 18 and over.

99.2% of residents lived in urban areas, while 0.8% lived in rural areas.

There were 10,014 households in Christiansburg, of which 27.7% had children under the age of 18 living in them. Of all households, 45.0% were married-couple households, 18.2% were households with a male householder and no spouse or partner present, and 28.8% were households with a female householder and no spouse or partner present. About 30.5% of all households were made up of individuals and 10.9% had someone living alone who was 65 years of age or older.

There were 10,715 housing units, of which 6.5% were vacant. The homeowner vacancy rate was 1.4% and the rental vacancy rate was 6.4%.

Racial composition as of the 2020 census
Race	Number	Percent
White	19,463	83.4%
Black or African American	1,439	6.2%
American Indian and Alaska Native	63	0.3%
Asian	526	2.3%
Native Hawaiian and Other Pacific Islander	10	0.0%
Some other race	396	1.7%
Two or more races	1,451	6.2%
Hispanic or Latino (of any race)	977	4.2%

=== 2000 census ===
As of the 2000 census, there were 16,947 people, 7,093 households, and 4,766 families residing in the town. The population density was 1,217.0 people per square mile (470.1/km^{2}). There were 7,430 housing units at an average density of 533.6 per square mile (206.1/km^{2}). The racial makeup of the town was 93.13% White, 4.83% African American, 0.21% Native American, 0.41% Asian, 0.02% Pacific Islander, 0.48% from other races, and 0.91% from two or more races. Hispanic or Latino of any race were 0.99% of the population.

There were 7,093 households, out of which 31.2% had children under the age of 18 living with them, 52.6% were married couples living together, 11.3% had a female householder with no husband present, and 32.8% were non-families. 27.0% of all households were made up of individuals, and 9.5% had someone living alone who was 65 years of age or older. The average household size was 2.35 and the average family size was 2.86.

In the town, the population was spread out, with 23.8% under the age of 18, 8.0% from 18 to 24, 33.3% from 25 to 44, 22.8% from 45 to 64, and 12.1% who were 65 years of age or older. The median age was 35 years. For every 100 females, there were 92.7 males. For every 100 females age 18 and over, there were 89.0 males.

The median income for a household in the town was $40,851, and the median income for a family was $47,428. Males had a median income of $35,139 versus $23,398 for females. The per capita income for the town was $19,579. About 6.4% of families and 8.5% of the population were below the poverty line, including 12.2% of those under age 18 and 6.9% of those age 65 or over.

== Arts and culture ==
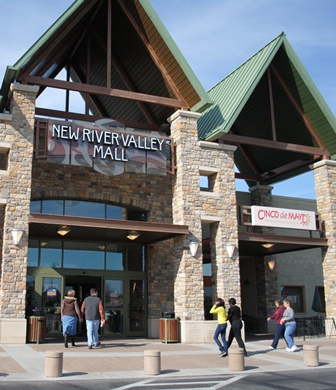
Former New River Valley Mall

New River Valley Mall was renamed Uptown Christiansburg in 2020. A branch of the New River Community College is located there. There is one movie theater in Christiansburg. The town used to have a drive in movie theater, which was demolished in 2025.

== Parks and recreation ==
Christiansburg maintains public parks, an aquatic center, a recreation center, and the Huckleberry Trail. The recreation center offers bike rentals, basketball courts, a track, racquetball courts, and multi-purpose rooms.

== Infrastructure ==
=== Transportation ===
==== Highways ====
Interstate 81 runs along the southern edge of Christiansburg. U.S. Route 11 runs east–west through the town.

U.S. Route 460 goes north from Christiansburg to Blacksburg, the location of Virginia Polytechnic Institute and State University.

==== Rail ====
Historically, several Norfolk and Western/Southern Railway trains a day, the Birmingham Special, the Pelican and the Tennessean, made stops at Christiansburg station. Today, Christiansburg serves a control point on the NS Christiansburg district which runs from Roanoke, Virginia to Bluefield, West Virginia.

==== Bus service ====
Blacksburg Transit provides bus transportation in Christiansburg, and operates four routes within the town, The Explorer, Go Anywhere, TTS (Two Town Spradlin Farms), and the TTH (Two Town Hospital).

The Smart Way Bus, a regional bus service operated by Valley Metro, provides connecting service between Virginia Tech, downtown Blacksburg, Christiansburg, Roanoke–Blacksburg Regional Airport, and Roanoke, Virginia, where riders can transfer to a Northeast Regional Amtrak train.

The Virginia Breeze provides intercity bus service between Blacksburg, Christiansburg, Harrisonburg, Virginia and Washington, D.C.

Radford Transit provides bus service connecting downtown Christiansburg, the Aquatic Center and New River Valley Mall to Radford, Virginia and Blacksburg/Virginia Tech.

Pulaski Area Transit provides bus service connecting Pulaski, Virginia and the Uptown Christiansburg Mall by way of Dublin, Virginia and Fairlawn, Virginia.

== Notable people ==
- Chris Bachelder, writer and e-book pioneer
- Robert Craig, U.S. Congressman
- George Rogers Clark Floyd, Secretary of Wisconsin Territory and member of the West Virginia House of Delegates, was born in Christiansburg
- Matt Hagan, four-time NHRA Funny Car Champion, Former Pro Mod Driver
- Henry King, Hollywood director
- Louis King, Hollywood actor and director
- Derrick Lancaster, racing driver
- Clyde Lynn, racing driver
- Archer Allen Phlegar, Virginia Supreme Court justice and Virginia State Senator
- Ruby Altizer Roberts, author and the poet laureate of Virginia
- Ronnie Thomas, 1978 NASCAR Rookie of the Year, and his father Jabe Thomas, was also a NASCAR Grand National driver
- Gertrude Hoag Wilson, composer and college music director
