= Guy Carleton Drewry =

American author and poet

- Born: May 21, 1901; Stevensburg, Virginia
- Died: August 3, 1991 (aged 90); Roanoke, Virginia
- Occupations: Poet, Statistician
- Spouse: Margaret Elizabeth McDonald (m. 1942)
- Writing career
- Genre: Poetry
- Notable awards: Poetry Awards Foundation Prize for "Best Volume of Poems in English"; 1953 A Time for Turning

Guy Carleton Drewry (May 21, 1901 - August 3, 1991) was an American writer and poet. He served a life appointment as the Poet Laureate of Virginia from 1970 to 1991. His novels include The Writhen Wood, Cloud Above Clocktime, and To Love that Well.

== Biography ==
Guy Carleton Drewry was born in Stevensburg, Virginia on May 21, 1901. He was the son of a Methodist circuit minister, causing him to spend much of his childhood moving around. He had no formal education due to this, learning to read from his sister and practicing poetry through hymnals. Drewry first began writing on his own at the age of 18, not publishing any work until later in his career.

In 1922, Drewry began working as a railroad statistician for Norfolk and Western Railway through a friend's recommendation. He later admitted he did not like this position, but it paid the bills so he could continue writing. It was around this time he began frequenting the Roanoke Public Library, which gave him his first consistent source of books. In 1923, Drewry sold his first work to a magazine called The Dial. In addition, he served as the associate editor of The Lyric from 1929 to 1939. Drewry continued writing for various magazines, including Virginia Quarterly Review, The New York Times, and The Nation. Drewry's first novel Proud Horns was published in 1933. This was followed by Sounding Summer in 1948, Time of Turning in 1951, The Writhen Wood in 1953, and Cloud Above Clocktime in 1957.

Drewry was married on April 2, 1942, to Margaret Elizabeth McDonald. The two had two children, a daughter, Barbara Louise Anderson, and a son, Guy Carleton ″David″ Drewry Jr. In 1966, he retired from his statistician position, devoting his time to poetry. He then served as President of the Virginia Poet Society as well as a Regional Vice President of the Poetry Society of America. In 1970, the Virginia General Assembly named Drewry Virginia's Poet Laureate for life. Drewry published his final work To Love That Well in 1975, which was a compilation of poems in past novels and publications.

Drewry died due to pneumonia and congestive heart failure on August 3, 1991

== Works ==
Drewry's themes are usually existentialist, focusing on the passage of time, death, and the natural world. His poems rely heavily on the usage of imagery to deliver his messages. Drewry often takes a position of authority in his poems, attempting to explain to the reader how the world operates.

=== Books ===
- Proud Horns (1933)
- Sounding Summer (1948)
- Time of Turning (1951)
- The Writhen Wood (1953)
- Cloud Above Clocktime (1957)
- To Love That Well (1975)

== Awards ==
- 1953 Poetry Awards Foundation Prize for "Best Volume of Poems in English" for A Time for Turning
- Keats Memorial Lyric Prize
