= Blackbird (journal) =

Online journal of literature and the arts

- Discipline: Literary journal
- Language: English

Publication details
- History: 2002–present
- Publisher: Virginia Commonwealth University and New Virginia Review (United States)
- Frequency: Biannual

Standard abbreviations
- ISO 4: Blackbird

Indexing
- ISSN: 1540-3068

Links
- Journal homepage

Blackbird is an online journal of literature and the arts based in the United States that posts two issues a year, May 1 and November 1. During the six-month run of an issue, additional content appears as "featured" content. Previous issues are archived online in their entirety.

== Background ==
Blackbird publishes fiction, poetry, plays, interviews, reviews, and art by both new and established writers and artists. The journal frequently includes streaming audio and video content, including readings, interviews, and art lectures. Each fall issue forefronts work by, and about, the late Larry Levis. The journal's reading period for poetry and fiction closes between April 15 and September 15. Unsolicited reviews, plays, and art work are not considered.

== Publisher ==
Blackbird is published jointly by the Creative Writing Program of the Department of English at Virginia Commonwealth University in partnership with New Virginia Review, Inc., a nonprofit literary arts organization based in Richmond, Virginia. Its founding editors included Gregory Donovan, Mary Flinn, William Tester, M. A. Keller and Jeff Lodge. The journal is staffed by employees of the two sponsoring organizations as well as by interns and volunteers.

Blackbird has published poems by many poets, including: Seyed Morteza Hamidzadeh, Julia B. Levine, Sarah Rose Nordgren, Dave Smith, Sofia Starnes, Inge Pedersen, Wesley Gibson, Andrew Zawacki, Elizabeth King, Kiki Petrosino, Negar Emrani, Kaveh Akbar, and others.

== Recognition ==
Blackbird was one of the first literary journals to be included in the LOCKSS international archive.

Blackbird received AP Wire coverage for its publication of a previously unpublished sonnet of Sylvia Plath in their Fall 2006 issue. Entitled "Ennui", the poem was composed during Plath's early years at Smith College.

Ron Antonucci, in the Library Journal, describes Blackbird it as "one of the most successful, well-assembled online literary magazines available... it is graphically attractive and has attracted writers of stature such as . . . Reginald Shepherd and Gerald Stern."

Blackbird was named as the "best online publication" of 2007 by storySouth. The same year, Blackbird was awarded the Million Writers Award by storySouth by having seven stories selected as "notable stories of the year".
