= The Lyric (magazine) =

American poetry magazine

- Editor: Jean Mellichamp Milliken (2001–)
- Former editors: Leslie Mellichamp (1997–2001); Ruby Altizer Roberts (1952–1977); Virginia Kent Cummins (1949–1952); Leigh Hanes (1929–1949); John Richard Moreland (1921–1929)
- Categories: Traditional poetry
- Publisher: The Lyric Foundation (1949–); Norfolk Poets' Club (1921–1928)
- First issue: 1921; 104 years ago
- Country: USA
- Based in: Norfolk, Virginia, U.S. New York City, New York, U.S.
- Website: http://www.thelyricmagazine.com/

The Lyric is the oldest extant literary magazine in North America devoted to formal poetry.

The journal was established by Norfolk, Virginia-based poet John R. Moreland in 1921, and was published by the Norfolk Poets' Club until 1928. By 1949 it had moved to New York City, and was being published by the Lyric Foundation, an organization founded by the magazine's third editor, Virginia Kent Cummins. After Cummins' death editorship passed to Ruby Altizer Roberts, poet laureate of Virginia.

== Contributors ==
The journal has featured works by the following notable poets:

- Henry Bellamann
- Gamaliel Bradford
- Alma Denny
- Emily Dickinson
- Robert Hillyer
- Aline Kilmer
- Walter de la Mare
