= Ruby Altizer Roberts =

American poet

- Born: April 22, 1907; Alum Ridge, Virginia
- Died: May 24, 2004 (aged 97); Christiansburg, Virginia
- Occupation: Poet
- Writing career
- Genres: Formal poetry, children's literature, genealogy

Ruby Altizer Roberts (April 22, 1907 – May 24, 2004) was a writer and the first female Poet Laureate of Virginia.

== Personal life ==
Roberts was born in Alum Ridge, Virginia in 1907. When she was still a child her family moved to Cambria, Virginia, where she spent most of the rest of her life. She was married to highway contractor Laurence Roberts from 1927 until his death in 1966; the couple had one daughter.

== Writing ==
Early in her career Roberts published two collections of poetry, Forever Is Too Long (1946) and Command the Stars (1948). Her poems also appeared in magazines and in newspapers such as The New York Times and The Washington Post. In 1952 she became editor of traditional poetry journal The Lyric, a position she held for the next 25 years.

Her prose works consist of a genealogical history, three memoirs, and the children's book The Story of Buzzy Bee (1982).

== Awards and recognition ==
Roberts received a number of awards and honours in connection with her writing. In 1950 she was named the Poet Laureate of Virginia; she was the first woman to win the award. In 1961 she was conferred an honorary humanities doctorate by the College of William & Mary in Virginia. She became the only poet to hold the title "poet laureate emeritus of Virginia," which she was awarded by the General Assembly of Virginia in 1992.

== Bibliography ==
- Emera Altizer and his Descendants, with Sketches of Connected Families (with Rosa Altizer Bray, 1937)
- Forever is Too Long, 1946
- Command the Stars (illustrated by Don Blanding, 1948)
- The Way it Was (1979)
- The Story of Buzzy Bee (illustrated by Jeanne Altizer Barley, 1982)
- Look Down at the Stars (1994)
- The Way it is (1994)
