= Thomas Lomax Hunter =

American poet and columnist (1875–1948)

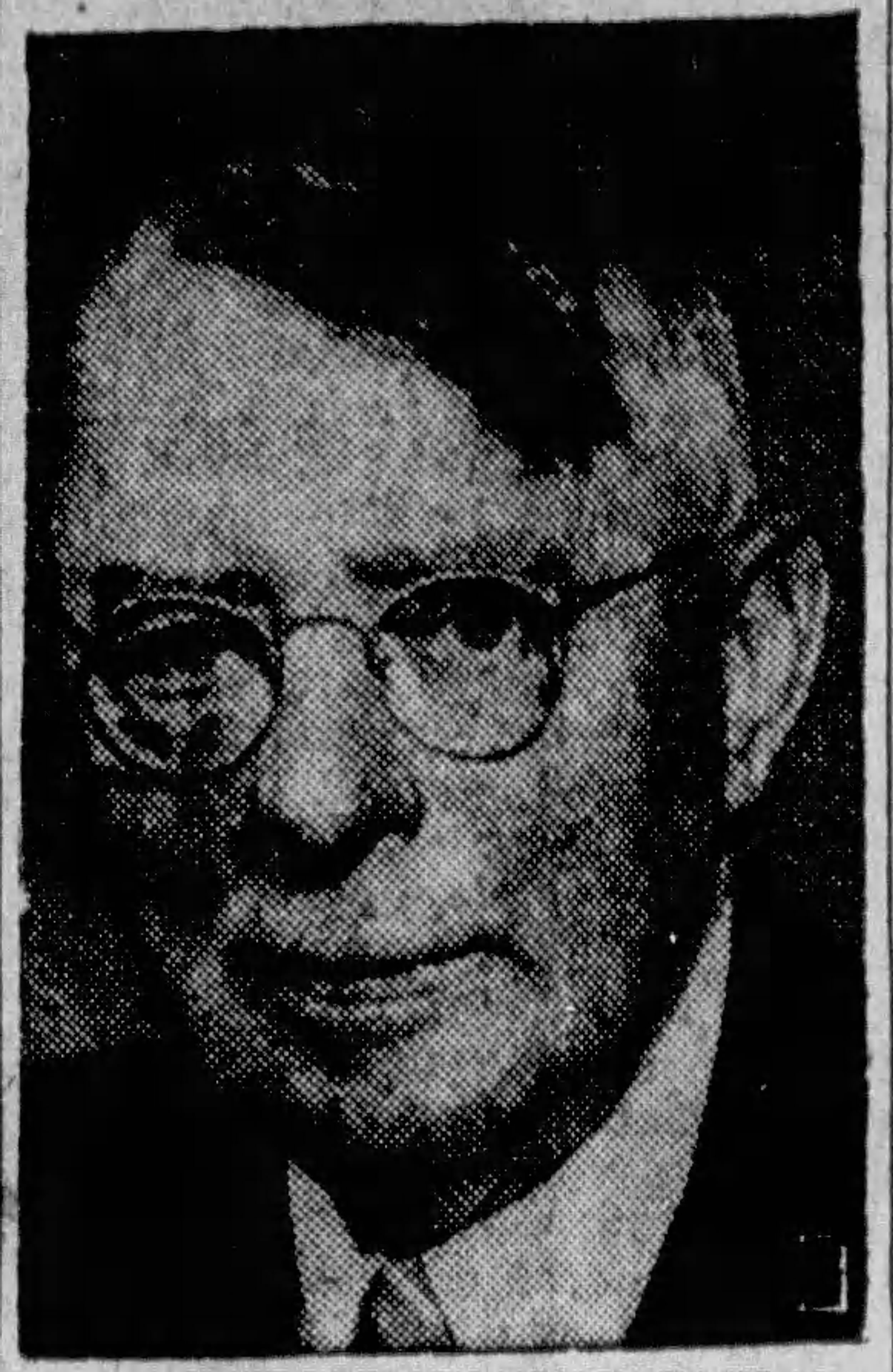
- 1948 photo of Thomas Lomax Hunter (III)
- Born: March 6, 1875; Belle Grove Plantation, Virginia, US
- Died: June 19, 1948 (aged 73); Fredericksburg, Virginia, US
- Occupations: lawyer, Virginia delegate, newspaper columnist
- Notable work: Forbidden Fruits and Other Ballads (1923)
- Spouse: Marie Reid Doherty
- Relatives: Patch Adams (grandson)

Signature
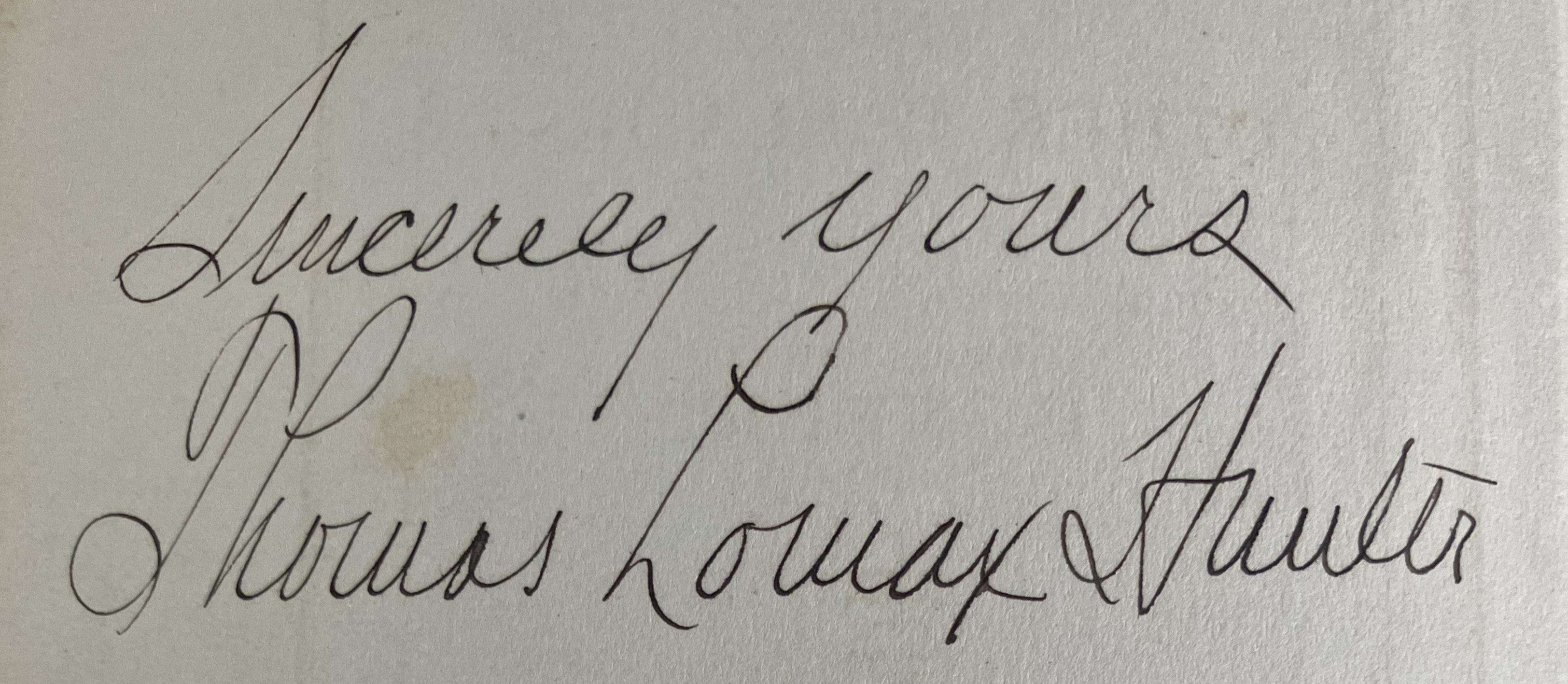

Thomas Lomax Hunter (March 6, 1875 – June 19, 1948) was a poet, deputy clerk for King George County, lawyer, Virginia Delegate for Stafford and King George counties, newspaper columnist for the Free Lance Star and the Richmond Times Dispatch and the Poet Laureate of Virginia.

== Early life ==
Hunter was born on March 6, 1875, at Belle Grove Plantation.

He attended Georgetown University Law School for a year from 1899 to 1900.

== Deputy clerk for King George County ==
Hunter served as deputy clerk under Edward Lloyd Hunter from around 1900 to 1909.

Due to a lack of documentation of King George County deputy clerks, the only supporting documentation that Thomas Lomax Hunter was a deputy clerk are three newspaper articles from June 1908.

They document an incident which occurred on June 4, 1908, at the King George County Courthouse. According to two of the articles, Thomas Lomax Hunter arranged for a meeting with Reverend Byrd Thornton Turner, the Episcopal minister of King George County. The meeting was to discuss "some injurious report circulated by Mr. Turner about him {Hunter} and his family". The meeting turned into a fight where Rev. Turner attempted to attack Hunter but was restrained by his son-in-law W. A. Rose, the commonwealth attorney of King George County.

== Legal career ==
Hunter passed the written bar exam in November 1908.

On August 26, 1910, he opened a law office in Colonial Beach, Virginia with George Ogle Taylor. As a lawyer, he served clients mostly in King George, Stafford, Westmoreland and Fredericksburg.

== Delegate of Virginia ==
Hunter announced his candidacy for the House of Delegates for King George and Stafford counties on October 4, 1917. He ran as a Democrat and won.

On September 6, 1919, he declined to run for re-election, but with unanimous nomination from the Democrat party in King George and Stafford, he was re-elected to the House of Delegates.

== Literary career ==
Hunter's literary career began with him contributing poems to various magazines such as Lippincott's Monthly Magazine, St. Nicholas and The Saturday Evening Post.

He later placed many of these poems in a newspaper column in the Richmond Times-Dispatch called The Rappahannock Rhapsodist, which ran from February 1, 1914 to April 18, 1914. It was later fully compiled along with many other of his earlier poems in Forbidden Fruits and Other Ballads (1923).

His next column was run in the Free-Lance Star from October 5, 1927 to February 25, 1929, under two different names. Originally called The Waste Basket (October 5, 1927 – December 2, 1927) and then The Light Ship (December 5, 1927 – February 25, 1929).

The column ran every Monday, Wednesday and Friday on page four.

His final newspaper column was called As It Appears to The Cavalier which ran in The Richmond Times-Dispatch. It ran daily for a total of 19 years from February 26, 1929 until his death on June 19, 1948.

Both The Light Ship and The Cavalier's format were nearly identical with the minor difference being that The Light Ship had a disclaimer at its heading that "[t]he views and opinions expressed from time to time in this column are personal to the writer and are not necessarily those of this newspaper".

The columns were used to express Hunter's opinion on the politics of the time, personal musings, poetry, and to answer letters to him from readers of his column.

== Poet Laureate of Virginia ==
In March 1948, Hunter was made Poet Laureate of Virginia for the year of 1948, as part of a compromise with Leigh Buckner Hanes that the latter would be made the Poet Laureate for 1949.

== Family ==
Hunter married Marie Reid Doherty on December 3, 1910, at Marie's home "Waverly" in King George County. Their wedding was officiated by Reverend R. G. James of the Methodist Church of King George County.

Marie Reid Doherty was the only daughter of Mrs. Nannie B. Doherty and Mr. William J. Doherty. She was also the granddaughter of William S. Brown, the longest serving clerk of King George County from Sept 4, 1845 to 1887. He saved numerous county records during the American Civil War by hiding them in Waverly's attic, when Union troops came though King George County. One of those records he saved was the will of Augustine Washington, currently held by King George County.

Hunter and Doherty had four children.

Hunter's maternal grandson is Patch Adams.

Hunter died of heart failure in Mary Washington Hospital on June 19, 1948. His funeral was held at Waverly and he was buried at St. John's Episcopal Church

== Writings ==
- Forbidden Fruits and Other Ballads (1923)
- Thomas Lomax Hunter, Poems (Richmond, Virginia: The Dietz Printing Co., 1947)
- Thomas Lomax Hunter, The President's Camp on the Rapidan (Richmond, Virginia: Virginia State Commission on Conservation and Development, 1931)
- Columns from the Cavalier (Richmond, Virginia: The Dietz Press, 1935)

== Gallery ==
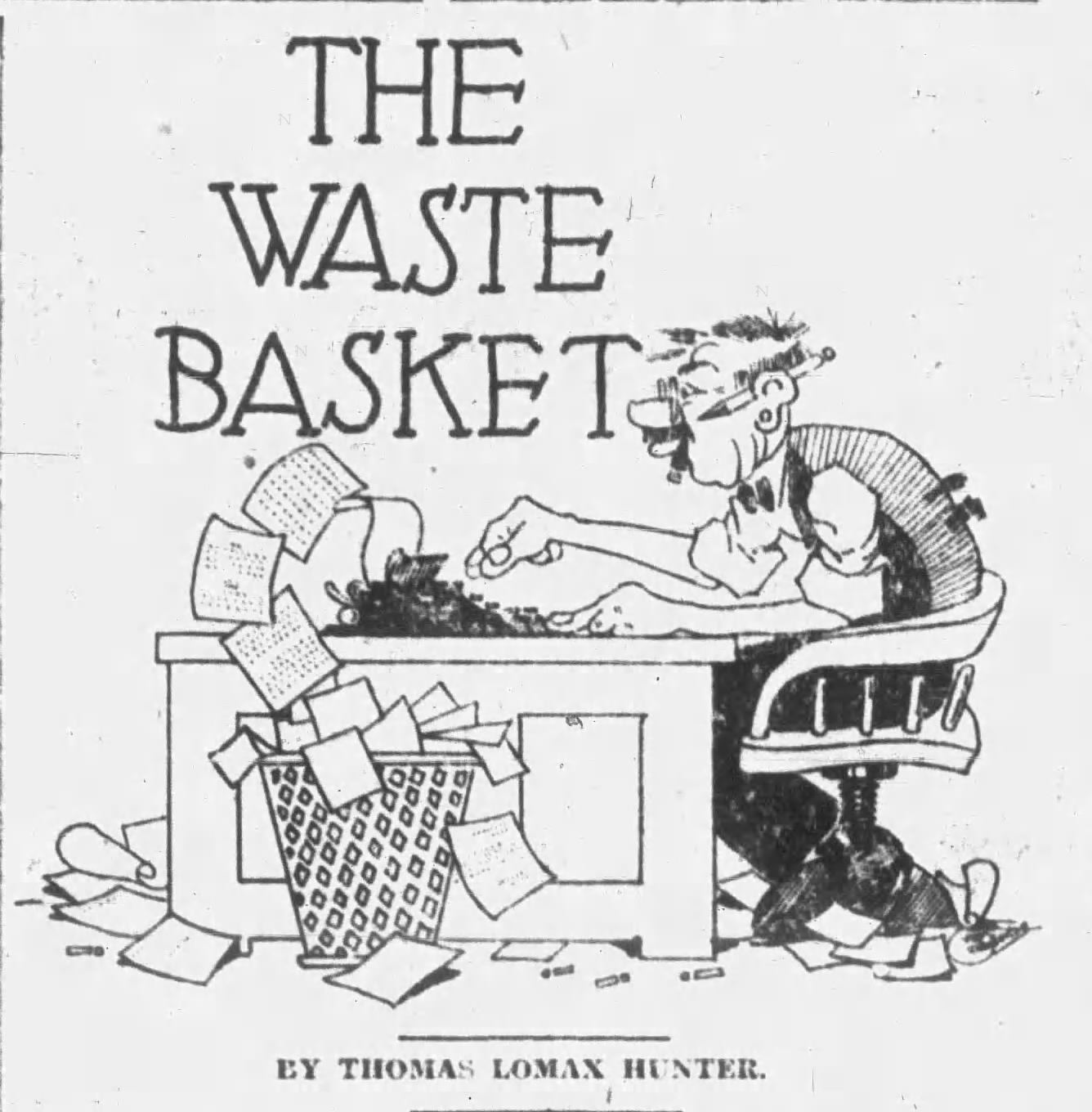
Heading for The Waste Basket, 1927

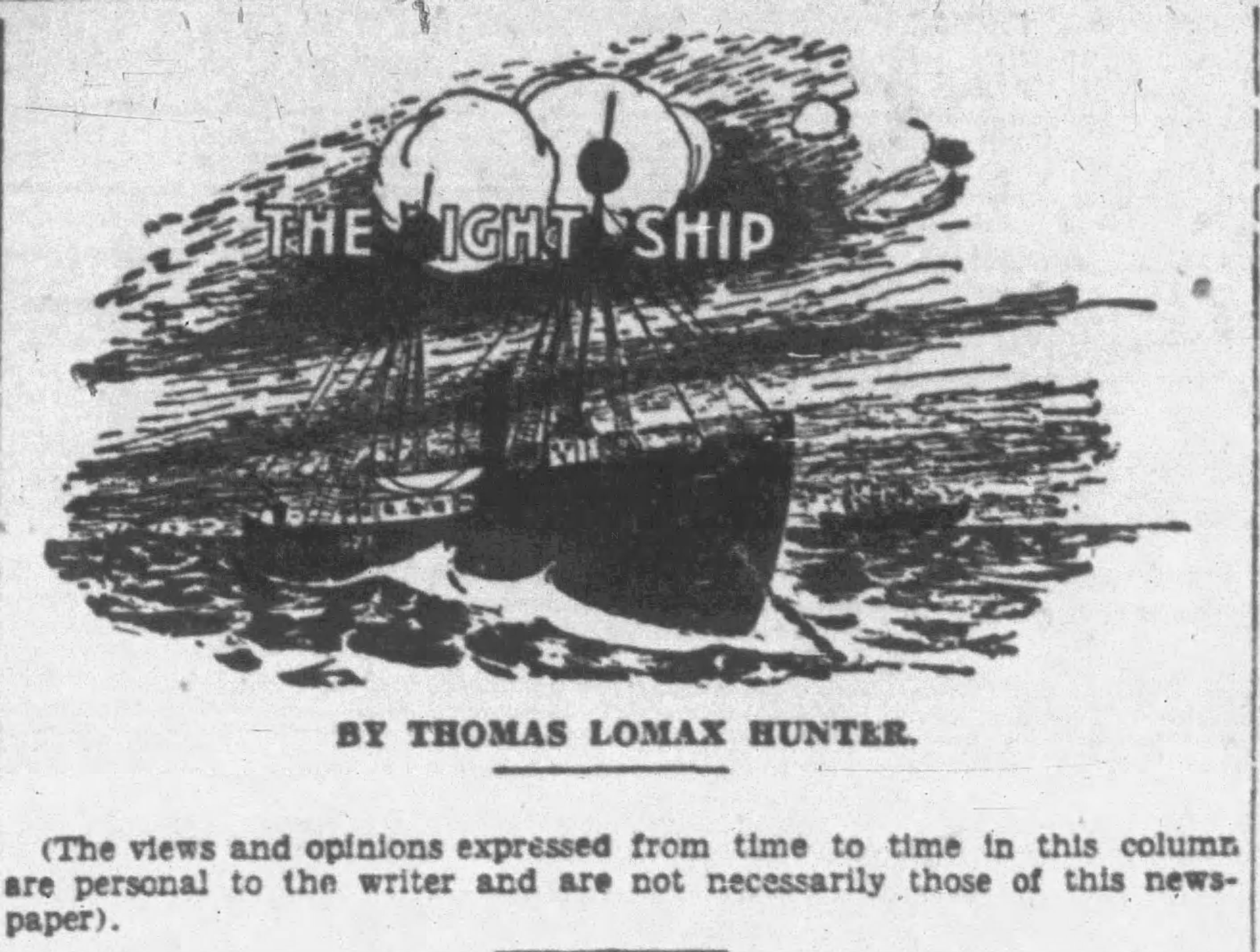
Heading for The Light Ship, 1929

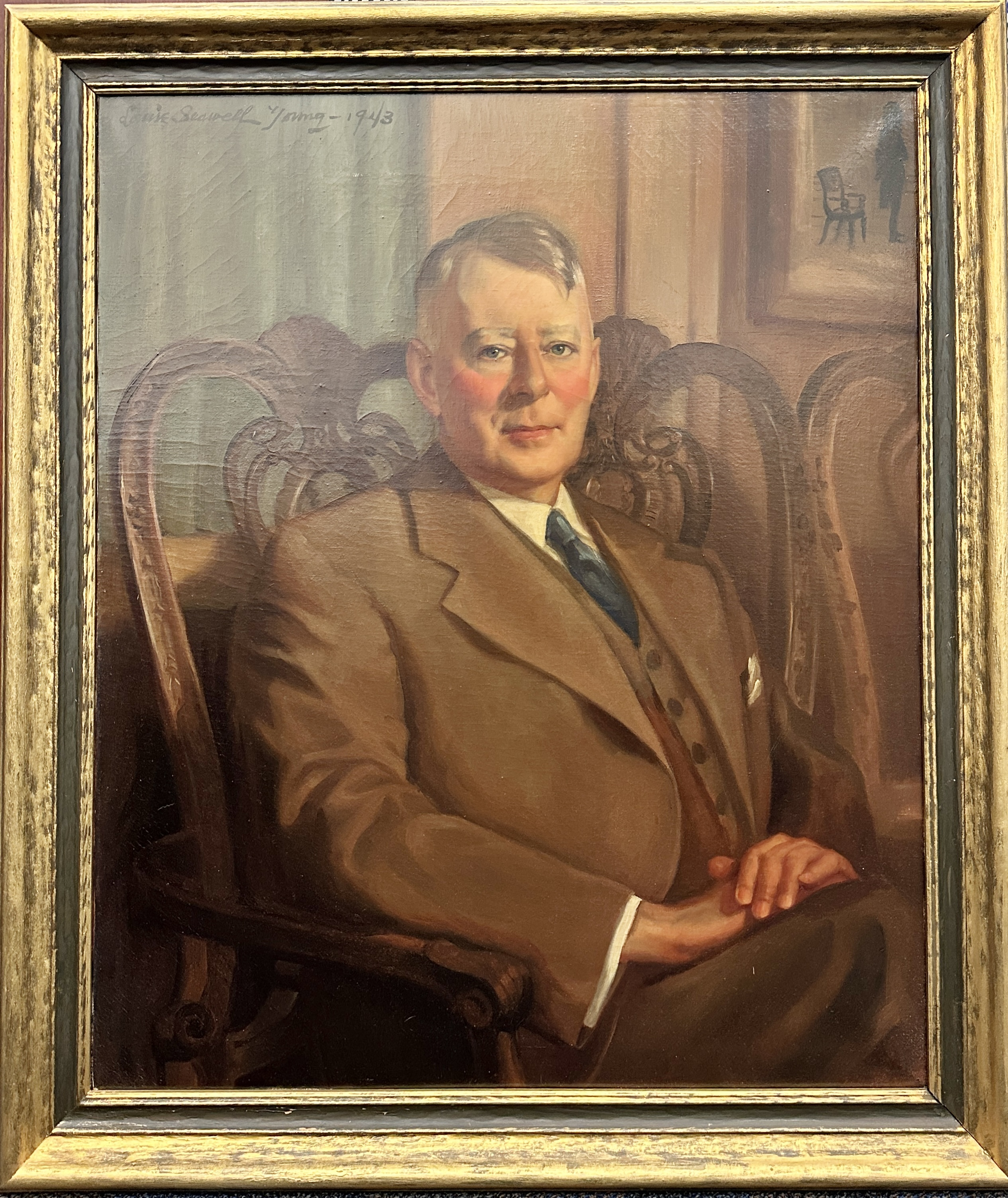
Portrait of Thomas Lomax Hunter, painted 1943 by Louie Seawell Young. Currently owned by the King George Historical Society
