= Carolyn Kreiter-Foronda =

American poet, artist and author

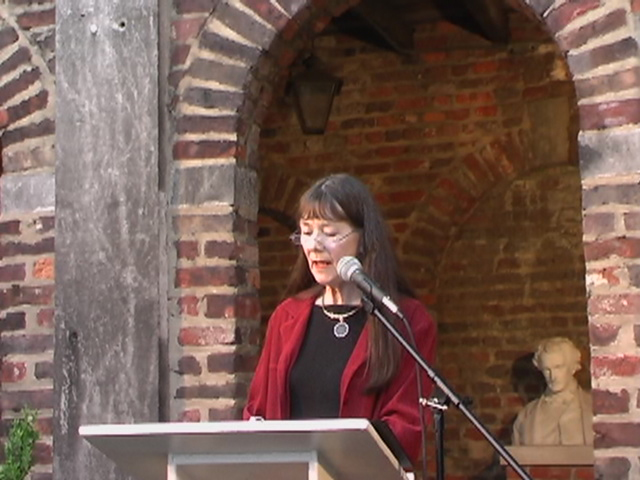
- Kreiter-Foronda in 2010
- Born: Carolyn Kreiter; 1946 (age 79–80); Virginia, U.S.
- Education: University of Mary Washington; George Mason University
- Occupations: Poet, artist, educator
- Writing career
- Genre: Poetry
- Notable works: The Embrace: Diego Rivera and Frida Kahlo (2013)
- Notable awards: Poet Laureate of Virginia
- Website: www.carolynforonda.com

Carolyn Kreiter-Foronda (born 1946) is an American poet, artist, and educator. She was named Poet Laureate of Virginia by the Governor, Tim Kaine in 2006, and served in this position through 2008. She has published numerous poetry collections. Kreiter-Foronda is also an abstract colorist painter, and her paintings have been featured in solo exhibitions.

== Early life ==
Kreiter-Foronda was born in Central Virginia in 1946. Her mother, Lucille Kreiter, was her teacher in fifth and sixth grades. Her father, Victor Kreiter, Sr., was her high school principal at Highland Springs High School. She spent her youth in Crewe, Pulaski, and Sandston, Virginia. As a child, she read poetry and wrote her first poem before entering elementary school. Encouraged by her parents, she devoted hours to writing poetry and fiction. Her parents also influenced her decision to become an English and creative writing teacher.

While attending high school, she developed an interest in journalism and became a staff member of the school newspaper, Highland Fling. She also served as a youth page correspondent for the Richmond News Leader. She was inducted into Quill and Scroll and the Beta Club. During her sophomore year, she received a Citizenship Award, and as a senior, she was awarded a Future Teachers of America Scholarship and the Dr. Joseph Haven Hoge Memorial Scholarship for university study.

She attended Mary Washington College (now the University of Mary Washington). While there, she was a member of Hoofprints and won several first-place awards in horse shows. During her senior year, she served as president of the Student Education Association and as vice-president of the Student Virginia Education Association. In 1969, she graduated with a B.A. in English (Mortar Board).

She received a Master of Arts, a Master in Education, and a Ph.D. degree from George Mason University, where she studied creative writing under Peter Klappert and Ai. In 1983, she was awarded the first doctorate presented by the school. She won a Scholarship and Service Award and a Letter of Recognition for Quality Research from the Virginia Educational Research Association for her dissertation, Gathering Light: A Poet's Approach to Poetry Analysis.

== Career ==
In August 1969, Kreiter-Foronda started her teaching career at West Springfield High School in Springfield, Virginia. After retiring from a 31-year career in education, she developed a statewide poetry-in-the-schools program at the request of the Poetry Society of Virginia to promote poetry at all instructional levels (K-University). She co-edited with Edward W. Lull an instructional guide, entitled Four Virginia Poets Laureate: A Teaching Guide and secured grant funding to place copies of this book in various educational settings and libraries. She also led an effort through the Poetry Society of Virginia to fund an endowed poetry prize for deserving creative writing students at Virginia colleges and universities. To date, the College Prize, under the auspices of the Academy of American Poets, has been established at the College of William and Mary, the University of Mary Washington, Old Dominion University, the University of Richmond, and Virginia Tech.

Kreiter-Foronda was named Poet Laureate of Virginia by the Governor, Tim Kaine, on June 26, 2006, and served in this position from June 2006 to July 2008. While Poet Laureate, she launched a Poetry Book Giveaway Project. White Pine Press, University of Arkansas Press, and the Poetry Society of Virginia have contributed books, poetry DVDs, and CDs to this effort. She distributed these educational materials to universities and high schools throughout Virginia. She set up a Poet's Spotlight Page on her website to highlight the work of poets who have a strong Virginia connection. She gave poetry readings and workshops throughout the state. During her term as Poet Laureate, the Virginia State Board of Education honored her efforts with a Resolution of Appreciation for her recognition as Poet Laureate and for “her sustained leadership and devotion to promoting the writing and reading of poetry among Virginia's young people and to raising the study of the Arts to the highest level.”

From 2010 to 2011, she served as a literary arts specialist with Claudia Emerson, on a Metrorail Public Art Project conceived by the Art-in-Transit Program of the Washington Metropolitan Area Transit Authority.

Richard, the Magician, sculpture created by Carolyn Kreiter-Foronda to use as a teaching aid in the classroom.

Kreiter-Foronda also works as an abstract artist. She studied art for seventeen years under Irene Wood-Montgomery. Her paintings and sculptures have been exhibited in galleries, educational settings, and nursing homes throughout Virginia.. She is an abstract colorist whose preferred medium is acrylic.

Kreiter-Foronda is a member of the Katherine Anne Porter Society, the Poetry Society of America, the Chesapeake Bay Branch of the National League of American Pen Women, and the Associated Writers Program.

=== Academic positions and work experience ===
- Fairfax County Public Schools: English Specialist in Area II Administrative office; Writing Resource Teacher in Area III Administrative office; Teacher of Advanced Placement English and Creative Writing I, II, III; English Department Chairperson; Director, Writing Center, West Springfield High School (1969–2000)
- Teacher/Consultant in Writing, Northern Virginia Writing Project, George Mason University (1978–2000)
- Coordinator, George Mason University's Conference on the Teaching and Writing of Poetry and Fiction (1980)
- Instructor, The Writing Place, George Mason University (1980–1981)
- Creative Writing Instructor, workshops for young poets, Writer's Center, Bethesda, Maryland (1981–1983)
- Poet/Artist, Poetry in the Schools, Alexandria City Public Schools, Virginia (1985–1987)
- Adjunct Professor, George Mason University (1985–1989)
- Host, Cable Television, Channel 21, production of Teacher Feature, Fairfax County Public Schools (1988–1991)
- TV Host, Cable Television, Channel 21, production of “Focus On,” Interviewed teachers, K–12, volunteer parents, and students, Fairfax County Public Schools (1991–1992)
- Guest, Multicultural Show, A Rainbow of Colors, Channel 25, Fairfax County Public Schools (1992)
- Television Host, Cable Television, Channel 21, School scene, Red Apple, Fairfax County Public Schools (1993–1998)
- Independent Writing Consultant, Poet and Artist—Includes stints teaching art-inspired writing workshops for the Phillips Collection and the Virginia Museum of Fine Arts’ Statewide Partnership program (2000–present)
- Artist-in-Residency, Lancaster High School, funded by the Virginia Commission for the Arts and the Virginia Museum of Fine Arts and organized by the Rappahannock Art League (2009)
- Artist-in-Residency, Richmond Community High School, funded by the Virginia Commission for the Arts and the Richmond Public Schools (2011)
- Residency, “Poetry Comes Alive,” Kersey Creek Elementary School, funded by Hanover Education Foundation and PTA funds

Poetry reading byKreiter-Foronda at the Cafe Gutenberg in Richmond, VA. October 2005

=== Other positions, posts, and appointments ===
- Virginia Regional Advisory Board, National Scholastic Magazines (1979–1980)
- Virginia Association of Teachers of English Speakers’ Bureau (1979–1999)
- Alumni Board of Directors, George Mason University (Dean's representative, College of Education and Human Services, 1987–1989; Graduate Dean's representative, 1989–1990)
- Editorial Board, SCOP Publications, Inc. (1993–2000)
- Poetry in the Schools Director, Poetry Society of Virginia (2001-2006)
- Board of Directors, Chick Cove Association, Inc. (2004–2006)
- Board of Directors, Yates House Fine Art and Craft Gallery (2006–2008)
- Executive Director, Poetry Society of Virginia (2007-2013)
- Consulting Editor for San Francisco Bay Press (2008–2009)
- Appointed Member, The Poetry Committee of the Greater Washington, D.C.

== Honors and awards ==
=== Honors ===
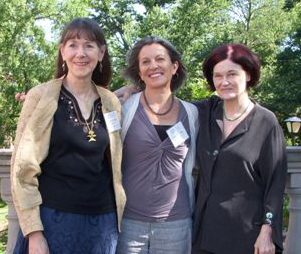
Virginia Poets Laureate at the University of Mary Washington Reunion Day, June 3, 2011. Carolyn Kreiter-Foronda (2006–2008), Claudia Emerson (2008–2010), and Kelly Cherry (2010–2012)

- Carolyn Kreiter-Foronda Day, West Springfield High School in Fairfax, VA (2006)
- Honorary lifetime member, Chesapeake Bay Writers (2006)
- Honorary lifetime member, The Virginia Writers Club (2006)
- Honorary member, Tennessee State Poetry League (2007)
- Master poet, Arlington Arts Center, Arlington, VA (2007)
- Lifetime membership award, Poetry Society of Virginia (2008)
- Phi Beta Kappa (Kappa of Virginia chapter), alumni member, University of Mary Washington (2008)

=== Awards ===
- First-place award, Alexandria Pen Women (1981)
- Phoebe poetry award (1983)
- First place, Spree Poetry Award, featured in Riverstone, Poets of the Foothills Arts Center (1984–1985)
- Third Prize, Passages North Poetry Competition (1986)
- Virginia Cultural Laureate Award in American Literature, poetry (invested for life into the VA Cultural Laureate Society by Governor Douglas Wilder) (1992)
- Edgar Allan Poe Poetry Award for "On Sturgeon Creek," Poetry Society of Virginia Adult Poetry Contest (1993)
- Fairfax County Board of Supervisors' Recognition Award, Contributions to the Commonwealth of Virginia in writing instruction (1994)
- Recognition, Outstanding Educator, National Foundation for the Advancement of the Arts (1994)
- Fairfax County Board of Supervisors’ Recognition Award, Excellence in Writing Instruction (1996)
- Recognition, Outstanding Educator, National Scholastic Art and Writing Awards (1996)
- National Scholastic Teacher Portfolio Award (one of five recipients in the USA) (1997)
- Rotary Meritorious Educator of the Year Award (1997)
- Hodgson Award for Excellence in Teaching English, Fairfax County School Board (1997)
- Teacher of the Year Award, selected by class of 1999, West Springfield High School, Fairfax County, Virginia (1999)
- Multiple Awards in Poetry, National League of American Pen Women, Chesapeake Bay Branch (2002, 2004)
- The Neuman Award and The Terrell Award, National League American Pen Women, Morning Glory Gallery, Gloucester, Virginia (2005)
- First Place Award in Poetry Competition, National League of American Pen Women, Chesapeake Bay Branch (2005)
- Resolution of Appreciation for Sustained Leadership and Devotion to Promoting the Writing and Reading of Poetry among Virginia's young people, presented by the Virginia Board of Education (2006)
- University of Mary Washington’s Distinguished Alumna of the Year Award (2007)
- George Mason University’s Distinguished Alumna of the Year Award (2007)
- Honored Poet, Art on the Half Shell, Middlesex Art Guild, Urbanna, Virginia (2008)
- Ellen Anderson Award, Poetry Society of Virginia (2011)
- Art in Literature: Mary Lynn Kotz Award for The Embrace: Diego Rivera and Frida Kahlo (2014)

=== Fellowships and grants ===
- Sabbatical Leave Grant, Fairfax County Public Schools (1980–1981)
- Grant Award, Writing Instruction, Fairfax County Public Schools (1981)
- Mini-Sabbatical Grant, Fairfax County Public Schools (1988)
- Three Artist-in-Education Study Grants, Virginia Commission for the Arts (1986, 1987, 1988)
- Arts-on-the-Road grant recipient, Virginia Commission for the Arts (1989)
- Jenny McKean Moore Fellowship, poetry, George Washington University, Washington D.C. (1990)
- Fellowship, Independent Study in the Humanities, "The Poetry of Pablo Neruda," Council for Basic Education (1991)
- Phi Delta Kappa Grant, "Award for Excellence: Technology in the Classroom" (1999)

== Personal life ==
Kreiter-Foronda and her husband reside in the River Country region of Virginia, where they have established a Backyard Wildlife Habitat, certified by the National Wildlife Federation. During their leisure time, they enjoy kayaking, Latin dancing, and American-style ballroom dancing.

== Selected publications ==
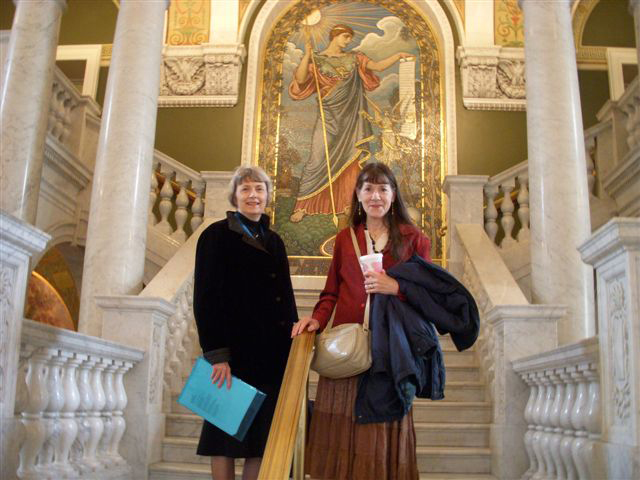
Joyce Brinkman and Kreiter-Foronda at the Library of Congress in Washington, D.C. in 2007

=== Poetry collections ===
- Contrary Visions (as Carolyn Kreiter-Kurylo). Potomac, MD: Scripta Humanistica, 1988. ISBN 9780916379476.
- Gathering Light. Catonsville, MD: SCOP Publications, Inc., 1993. ISBN 0-930526-20-1
- Death Comes Riding, Catonsville, MD: SCOP Publications, Inc., 1999. ISBN 0-930526-24-4
- Greatest Hits 1981–2000. Johnstown: Pudding House Publications, 2001. ISBN 1-58998-023-9
- River Country. San Francisco: San Francisco Bay Press, 2008. ISBN 978-1-60461-003-1
- Gathering Light. Franktown, VA: Northampton House Press, 2013.ISBN 978-1-937997-22-9
- The Embrace: Frida Kahlo and Diego Rivera. San Francisco: San Francisco Bay Press, 2013. ISBN 978-0982829561
- Seasons of Sharing: A Kasen Renku Collaboration. with Joyce Brinkman with Catherine Aubelle, Flor Aguilera García, Gabriele Glang, and Kae Morii. Fredonia: Leapfrog Press, 2014. ISBN 978-1-935248-63-7
- These Flecks of Color: New & Selected Poems. San Francisco: San Francisco Bay Press, 2018. ISBN 978-0996835039
- River Country: A Poem-Play. with Robert P. Arthur. Unicorn Bay Press, 2020. ISBN 978-1943416479

=== Book chapters ===
- "Teaching the Skill of Analyzing for Tone." in Teaching Thinking Skills: A Handbook for Secondary School Teachers. Barry K. Beyer, editor. Prentice Hall. 1991, pp. 225–247. ISBN 9780205127979.
- "Rita Dove." Laurels: Eight Women Poets. Stacy Tuthill, editor. Catonsville: SCOP Publications, Inc., 1998. ISBN 9780930526238.

=== Individual poems ===
==== In English ====
- Anthology of Magazine Verse & Yearbook of American Poetry. Alan Frederick Peter, editor. Schaumburg: Monitor Book Company, 1985. ISBN 9780917734120
- "January's Resolution", Eclectica Magazine, vol. 8, no. 3 (July/August 2004).
- "Leaving a Country Behind". Blood to Remember: American Poets on the Holocaust. St. Louis: Time Being Books, 2007. pp. 264-265. ISBN 9781568091129
- The Ghosts of Virginia, Vol. XIII. L. B. Taylor Jr., editor. L. B. Taylor, 2008. ISBN 978-1928966111
- After Shocks: The Poetry of Recovery for Life-Shattering Events. Tom Lombardo, editor. Winston-Salem: Press 53, 2008. ISBN 978-0981635408
- "Do You Know about the Raintree?" Terrain.org, no. 21 (Winter/Spring 2008) p. 62.
- "Crossing a Rappahannock River Bridge", "Baiting My Hook, I Try Again", "Lately I Have Been Too Wrapped Up", "Do You Know About the Raintree?", "All Saints' Day", and "These Flecks of Summer". The Other Voices International Cyber-Anthology, vol. 31 (April 1, 2008)
- "Carolyn Kreiter-Foronda – Six Poems". Dead Mule School of Southern Poetry (2008).
- "The Two Fridas, 1939," Comstock Review (2009)
- "Nude Descending in All Directions". Beltway Poetry Quarterly, Museum Issue (Winter 2009)
- "Two Voices: Frida's Heart." Autumn Sky Poetry, no. 15 (October 2009)
- "The Skeleton on Top of Frida Kahlo's Four-Poster Bed." Autumn Sky Poetry, no. 19 (October 2010).
- "Two Voices: Wizard of Horticulture" and "Two Voices: Roots" with Kera O'Bryon. Terrain.org, no. 25 (2010)
- “Painting in an Enclosed Field at Saint-Paul Hospital.” Nimrod International Journal, vol. 57, no. 2 (Spring/Summer 2014)

==== Other languages ====
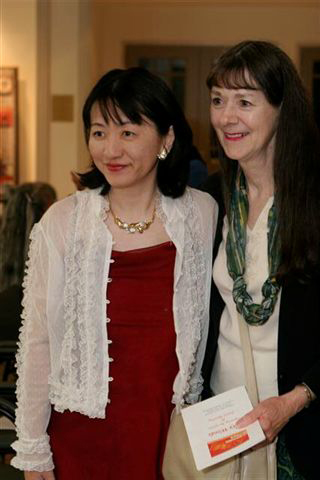
Kae Morii and Kreiter-Foronda

Kreiter-Foronda's first poem, written in Spanish and English, appears in her book, Gathering Light. Other poems have since been translated into Spanish by Rei Berroa, professor of Spanish and Latin American Studies at George Mason University, and appear in the anthology, Cauteloso engaño del sentito, edited by Berroa, as part of Colección Libros de la Luna, Vol. No. 2, Santo Domingo, República Dominicana, 2007.

Kreiter-Foronda and Joyce Brinkman, Poet Laureate of Indiana (2002–2008), wrote a kasen renga poem, published in the Tipton Poetry Review (Fall 2010, Issue #19) in collaboration with Kae Morii, a Japanese poet from Tokyo, who translated the poem into Japanese.

=== As editor ===
- In a Certain Place, co-editor with Alice Tarnowski. Catonsville: SCOP Publications, Inc., 2000. ISBN 0-930526-25-2
- Four Virginia Poets Laureate: A Teaching Guide, co-editor with Edward W. Lull. Norfolk: Poetry Society of Virginia, 2006. ISBN 0-9704804-5-8
- Urban Voices: 51 Poems from 51 American Poets, co-editor with Joyce Brinkman. San Francisco: San Francisco Bay Press, 2014. ISBN 978-0-9828295-4-7

== Articles about Kreiter-Foronda ==
=== Before 2000 ===
- Hayden, Mindy. "Hooked on Poetry" Letters to the Editor. The Washington Post, August 14, 1981.
- Churchman, Deborah. "Nursing Home Poets Rediscover ‘Self-Worth." The Washington Post. August 6, 1981, VA-11.
- Brelis, Matthew. "Acclaimed Poets, Writers to Teach GMU Workshops." The Washington Star. April 2, 1981, B-2.
- "First GMU PhD Learned for the Sake of Learning." Alexandria Gazette. Summer 1983.
- Farley, Charlotte. "George Mason's First Doctorate Combines Creativity with Education." GMU Today. Summer 1983, p. 2.
- "Carolyn Kurylo: Artist as Teacher." ETA-NV Newsletter. September 1983, pp. 4–5.
- Donovan, Rose Marie. "GMU Awards 1st Doctorate in 10 Years." The Fairfax Journal. May 23, 1983, A1, A4.
- Tavares, Traci and Lisa Melchiori. "Carolyn Kreiter-Kurylo: Profile of the Artist." The Heritage. 1983–84, p. 6.
- Carlos, Andrea. "For Jack of Arts Kurylo, Creativity is Focus." The Times. August 29, 1985, p. 7.
- Smith, Karin. "A Few Words on Teachers and Publishing." NVWP Newsletter. February 1985, pp. 6–7.
- "Techniques in the Creation of Poetry and Art." Teacher Feature of Carolyn Kurylo. SchoolScene with host John Duncan. Cable TV. Channel 21. September 20–26. 1986, 4:30, 8:00, and 10:00 p.m.
- Cascio, Chuck. "How to Make Words Work." The Connection. May 22, 1986, p. 15.
- Fanshel, Fran. "Words on Words." The Columbia Flyer. November 10, 1988, p. 103.
- Kennedy, Kathleen. "For Some, Dimview Lights the Darkness." The Washington Post. August 18, 1988, Virginia Weekly section.
- Black, Harold. "Reviews." (Contrary Visions) Visions. No. 28, 1988.
- "Poet to Visit Here on Grant." The Times. Smithfield, VA. April 26, 1989, 10.
- "Poetry Lessons." The Times. May 10, 1989, B-1.
- McNatt, Linda. "Poet Sees Poetry as Door to Creativity." The Sun. May 11, 1989, p. 10.
- "The Art Bank Sponsors Poetry Workshops." The South Hill Enterprise. May 17, 1989, 4B.
- Lynskey, Ed. "Review of Contrary Visions." The Southern Humanities Review. Vol. 23. No. 3. Summer 1989, pp. 285–287.
- Hammack, Georgia. "Miscellaneous: Writing Poetry," The South Hill Enterprise, June 14, 1989.
- Burke, Deborah. "Poet, Sculptor, Humanitarian: Burke's Carolyn Kreiter-Kurylo Shares Her Many Gifts with the Homeless." The Connection. July 6, 1989, p. 21.
- Moore, Lenard. "Contrary Visions Shows Poet as Visual Artist." The Pilot. Southern Pines, North Carolina. Vol. 69. No. 72, July 10, 1989.
- Burke, Deborah. "Renaissance Teacher." The Connection. September 6, 1989, p. 27.
- Allen, Frank. "Restless Visions." (Includes review of Contrary Visions) Poet Lore. Vol. 83. No. 2, 1989, pp. 49–54.
- Bell, Melissa. "Reviews." (Gathering Light) Visions. No. 45, 1994.
- "Renaissance Woman." The Free Lance-Star's Weekly Guide to Entertainment and Leisure. November 6, 1997, pp. 12–13.

=== 2000–2005 ===
- "Prizes Awarded for Paintings, Writings." Rappahannock Record. April 18, 2002, A3.
- "Five Published Poets Scheduled for Reading July 21." Rappahannock Record, July 11, 2002.
- "Poetry Interview with Carolyn Kreiter-Foronda and Denise DeVries." Thea Marshall Show. Windy 105, December 2002.
- "Poet Carolyn Kreiter-Foronda to Speak on Writing Process in Poetry." The Pulse of IB. Vol. 1. Issue 4, 2003.
- Abbott, Amy. "Danville Community College Presents 21st Annual Celebration of the Arts." Vol. 8. No. 3, April 2003.
- "Presentation of Bulgarian and American Poetry in Sofia." Bulgarian Diplomatic Review. Issue 7–8 (2003), 136–137.
- Cook, Carol. "An Evening of Art, Jazz, and Poetry." The Pen Woman. February 2005, p. 5.

=== 2006 ===
- Robertson, Erin. "Interview: Carolyn Kreiter-Foronda." Marauder, April 6, 2006.
- Rich, Colleen Kearney. "Mason Alumna is New Virginia Poet Laureate." The Mason Gazette, June 30, 2006.
- Chowning, Larry. "Governor Names Hardyville Writer Virginia Poet Laureate." Southside Sentinel. July 6, 2006, A1, A8.
- Cawley, Jon. "Mid-pen Poet Gets State Honors" Daily Press. July 18, 2006, C1–C2.
- Cawley, Jon. "Emotional Shock Sparks Life of Poetry: Mary Washington Grad Named State Laureate." Daily Press. July 18, 19, 2006, C1–C2.
- Cerullo, Bob. "Lions Club." Southside Sentinel. September 21, 2006, A9.
- Gittoes-Singh. "About the Author: Twice a Poet Laureate." The Pen Woman. September 2006, p. 11.
- VFH Radio Interview (Sondra Woodward, Reporter), September 29, 2006.
- Rich, Colleen Kearney. "A Way with Words." Mason Spirit. Fall 2006, p. 25.
- Bright, Anita. "TC Spotlight: NVWP TC Named Poet Laureate." The Journal of the Virginia Writing Project. Volume 27. Issue 2. 2006, p. 6.
- Healy, Amber. "A Laureate Returns Home." The Springfield Connection. November 14, 2006.
- Billingsley, Anna. "Alumna Named Poet Laureate." University of Mary Washington Today. Winter Issue, 2006, p. 25.

=== 2007 ===
- Lohmann, Bill, "Spreading the Joy of Poetry." The Richmond Times-Dispatch. January 14, 2007, G1, G3.
- "Dancing the Mambo in Gloucester." Glo-Quips. January 25, 2007, p. 1.
- Rich, Colleen Kearney. "Virginia's Poet Laureate Visits Campus Today." GMU Gazette. March 1, 2007.
- Williams, Ruth Baja. "Virginia's Poet Laureate." South County Chronicle. March 30, 2007, pp. 1, 5.
- Kimm, Mary. "Why Not a Poet Laureate." The Connection, April 5, 2007.
- "Celebration of Distinction: Carolyn Kreiter-Foronda, Alumna of the Year." Mason Spirit. Spring 2007, p. 8.
- Van Mullekom, Kathy. "Learn a Lot from a Laureate." Daily Press. April 28, 2007, B5.
- “UMW to Honor Distinguished Alumni during Reunion Weekend.” UMW News. June 1, 2007.
- Oral History Interview. Fenwick Library, George Mason University, June 8, 2007.
- "Distinguished Alumni Honored during Reunion Weekend." UMW Today. Fall 2007. Vol. 31. No. 3, p. 32.
- King, Martha Anne. "Nurturing Your Writing Instinct." Chesapeake Style. October 2007.
- Malone, Mandy. "Poet Laureate's Website Highlights Virginia Poets." Daily Press, June 24, 2007.
- Glose, Bill. "Life Lessons from Poet Laureate Carolyn Kreiter-Foronda." UpFront. Virginia Living, December 2007.

=== 2008 ===
- Television Interview. Virginia Currents. WCVE, WHTJ, WCVW. January 10, 2008.
- "Poet Laureate Pens New Book." Southside Sentinel. March 20, 2008, A12.
- Radio Interview. XTRA 99.1 FM. Gloucester, VA, April 14, 2008.
- "Power of Poetry," The Richmond Dispatch. April 14, 2008
- "Poet Laureate Visits Library." The Progress Index. April 23, 2008, A3.
- Malone, Mandy. "Near-Death Experience Fuels Author's Exploration of Life." Daily Press. April 27, 2008, G12.
- Ruehlmann, Bill. "In New Volume, Poet Laureate Finds Romance in the Ordinary." The Virginian-Pilot. May 18, 2008, p. 62.
- Blaine, Michael. "Carolyn Kreiter-Foronda's River Country." The Broadkill Review. Volume 2. Issue 3. May 2008, p. 60.
- "Book Report: River Country." University of Mary Washington Magazine. Summer 2008, p. 47.
- Kirk, Kristen De Deyn. "The Show-It Poet." Hampton Roads Magazine. July/August 2008, p. 41.
- Halstead, Nancy. "Cool Weather Reading: River Country." Pleasant Living. September/October 2008, p. 42.
- "Alumni Return to Class." University of Mary Washington Magazine. Fall/Winter 2008.
- Clark, Susannah. "Profiling a Well-Versed Alumna." The Bullet. November 19, 2008.
- Television Interview. "Woman's World." Gloucester, Virginia, Fall 2008.

=== 2009 to 2013 ===
- Douglas, Keri. "An Interview with Carolyn Kreiter-Foronda" with Keri Douglas, April 10. 2009. AUDIO only Audio only.
- Thomas, Margo. "Student Inspired by Poetry Lecture." Virginia Intermont College. November 5, 2010.
- Akers, Mary. "An Interview with Carolyn Kreiter-Foronda." r.kv.r.y. quarterly literary journal. vol. 6. #2 (Spring 2011) article includes two paintings by Kreiter-Foronda, as well as a conversation about Diego Rivera and Frida Kahlo, topic of the forthcoming book.
- McFarland, Laura. "Poet Laureate Offers Workshop at MSV." The Winchester Star. April 5, 2013.
- Price, Leah. "Poets Laureate Offer Verses that Inspire." Daily Press. April 26, 2013, P1.
- "Virginia's Poet Laureate to Visit Gloucester." Gloucester-Mathews Gazette-Journal. May 23, 2013, 5A.
- Chowning, Larry. "Hardyville Poet Featured in Anthology." Southside Sentinel. May 23, 2013, A8.
- Radio Interview. XTRA 99.1 FM. Gloucester, VA. May 24, 2013.
