= Uptown Christiansburg =

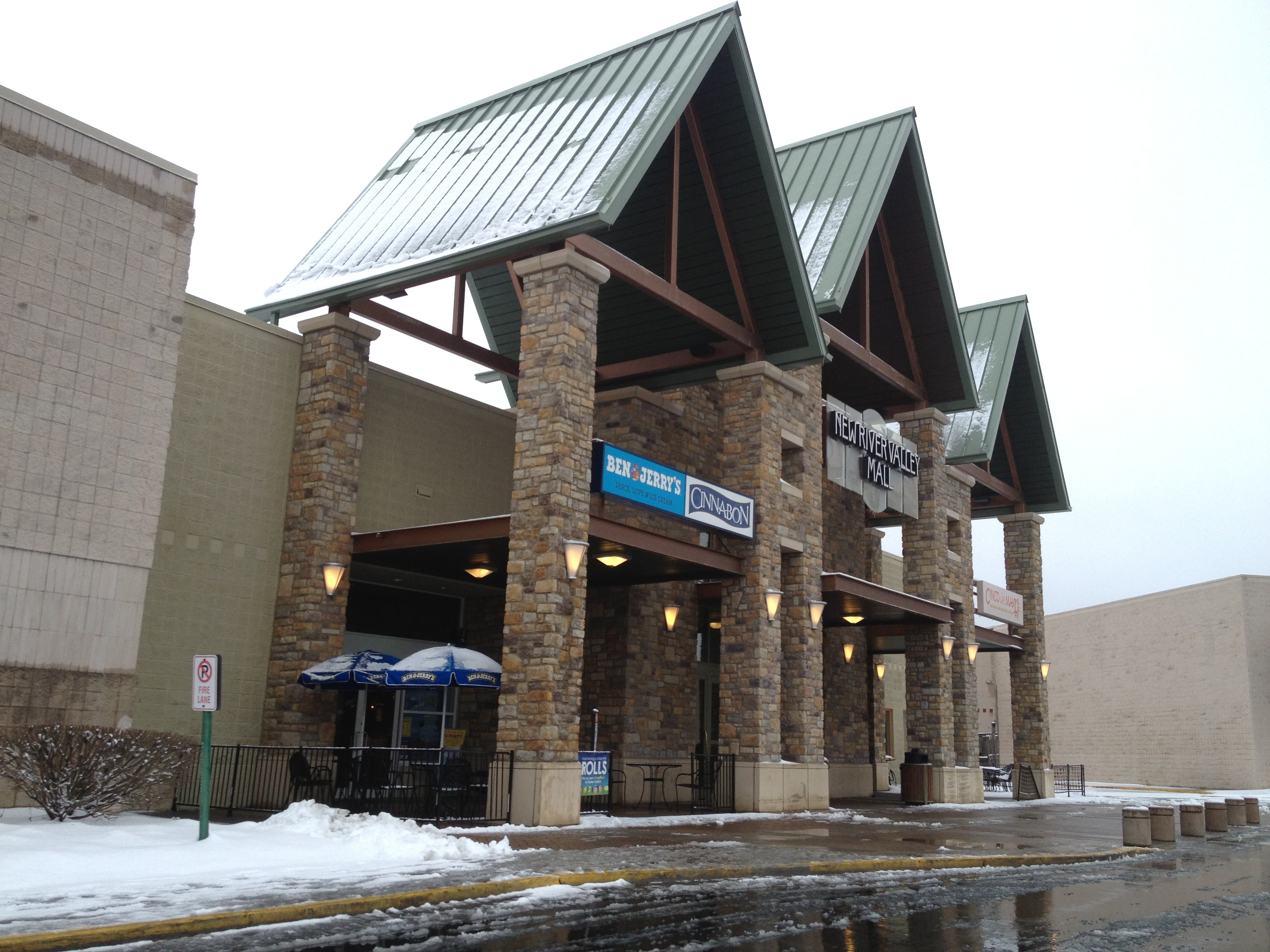
- New River Valley Mall
- Location: Christiansburg, Virginia, United States
- Coordinates: 37.1656°N 80.4275°W
- Address: 782 New River Road
- Opened: 1988
- Developer: Crown American
- Owner: RockStep Capital
- Num. of stores: 50+
- Num. of anchor tenants: 4
- Floor area: 464,000 square feet (43,100 m^{2})
- Floors: 1
- Website: uptownchristiansburg.com

Uptown Christiansburg (formerly New River Valley Mall) is an enclosed shopping mall in Christiansburg, Virginia, United States. Opened in 1988, it now features Kohl's, Belk, HomeGoods, and Dick's Sporting Goods as its major anchor stores.

== History ==
The mall opened in 1988. Built by Crown American, it originally featured Hess's, J. C. Penney, Sears, and Leggett (now Belk). The mall struggled with vacancy for several years, and was only at 75 percent occupancy for most of the 1990s. In response to this, PREIT, which bought most of the Crown American portfolio, renovated the center throughout the 21st century. Renovations included expansion of the Belk space and a new Dick's Sporting Goods store, replacing Peebles which was operating out of the former Hess's space. A vacated movie theater was also turned into a food court and a satellite campus of New River Community College.

Sears closed in 2014, and was replaced by Kohl's a year later. In 2016, Farallon Capital Management acquired the mall from PREIT, and hired CBL & Associates Properties to manage it. After J.C.Penney closed its store at the mall in 2017, the space was renovated to accommodate a new Ulta, Homegoods, and Kirkland's. Planet Fitness announced in 2018 that it would open in the Kohl's wing. Farallon Capital Management sold the mall to RockStep Capital for $21.6 million in Fall 2019. New River Valley Mall was renamed to Uptown Christiansburg in July 2020. Kirkland's closed in 2026.
