= Sofia Starnes =

American Poet Laureate of Virginia

- Occupation: Poet Laureate of Virginia
- Website: Sofia Starnes

Sofia Starnes is an American poet who was the Poet Laureate of Virginia from 2012 to 2014. She is the author of six poetry collections, as well as being a literary editor and translator. Before coming to Virginia, her family lived in the Philippines and Spain, where she studied at the University of Madrid.
