= Maie Dove Day =

American author and poet

- Born: Maie Dove; November 25, 1847; Richmond, Virginia, U.S.
- Died: March 3, 1923 (aged 75); Danville, Virginia, US
- Resting place: Green Hill Cemetery
- Occupation: Writer
- Spouse: William Chilton Day

Maie Dove Day (November 25, 1847 – March 3, 1923) was an American author and poet in post-Civil War Virginia.

== Early life and family ==
Maie Dove was born in 1847 in Richmond, Virginia, the daughter of Samuel E. Dove and Ann Eliza Ricks.

In 1872, she married William Chilton Day, a former assistant surgeon in the Confederate States Army and president of the Virginia State Medical Association. Their family resided in Danville, Virginia.

== Adult life ==
Day authored several works which were published in the 1890s. Her book of poetry The Blended Flags, written during the Spanish–American War, has remained in circulation and is in the permanent collection of the Library of Congress.

Day was a charter member of the Daughters of the American Revolution and served as historian for the Danville chapter. She was a delegate to the organizations' 21st continental congress in 1912.

Day's works have been regarded by historians as an insight into post-Civil War southern womanhood.

== Published works ==
- The Blended Flags (1898)
- Virginia. Prehistoric and Antebellum (1899)
- Uncle Yorke (1899)
