= Poet Laureate of Virginia =

The position of Poet Laureate of Virginia was established December 18, 1936 by the Virginia General Assembly.

Originally, the poet laureate of Virginia was appointed without outside consultation by the General Assembly, usually for one year, in a process that has been described being "more of a political thing".

As of 1996, the procedure was changed and most recently codified in 1998 in Virginia Code, Sec. 7.1–43, as follows:

7.1-43. Poet laureate.
The honorary position of Poet Laureate of Virginia is hereby created. Beginning in 1998, the Governor may appoint a poet laureate from a list of nominees submitted by the Poetry Society of Virginia. Each poet laureate shall serve a term of two years with no restrictions on reappointment.
(1997, c. 299.)

The Virginia General Assembly now confirms the governor's appointment.

== List of poets laureate of Virginia ==
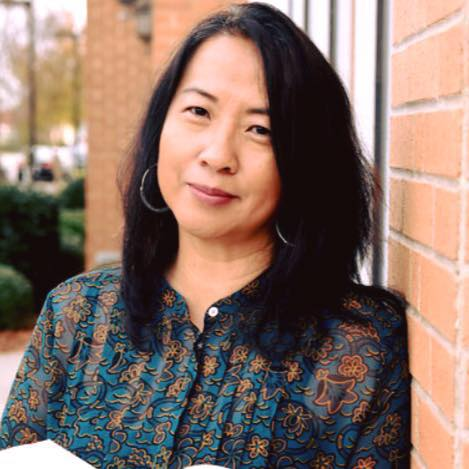
Luisa A. Igloria was poet laureate in 2020.

Current poet laureate:

- Latorial Faison (named July 18, 2026)

Former poets laureate:

- Mattie Quesenberry Smith (named Nov 26, 2024)
- Margaret O. Daramola (May 5, 2023 - Nov 25, 2024)
- Luisa Igloria (July 1, 2020 - June 30, 2022)
- Henry Hart (July 1, 2018 – June 30, 2020)
- Tim Seibles (July 1, 2016 – June 30, 2018)
- Ron Smith (July 1, 2014 – June 30, 2016)
- Sofia Starnes (July 1, 2012 – June 30, 2014)
- Kelly Cherry (July 1, 2010 – June 30, 2012)
- Claudia Emerson (August 26, 2008 – June 30, 2010)
- Carolyn Kreiter-Foronda (June 26, 2006 – June 30, 2008)
- Rita Dove (September 20, 2004 – June 25, 2006)
- George Garrett (July 9, 2002 – June 30, 2004)
- Grace Pow Simpson (2000–2002)
- Joseph Awad (1998–2000)
- Margaret Ward Morland (1996–1998)
- Kathryn Forrester Thro (July 1, 1994 – June 30, 1996)
- Guy Carleton Drewry (1970–1991)
- Ruby Altizer Roberts (1950; poet laureate emerita, 1992)
- Leigh Buckner Hanes (1949)
- Thomas Lomax Hunter (1948)
- Charles Day (1942–1948)
- Carter Warner Wormeley (1936–1938)

== See also ==
- Virginia literature
