= Claudia Emerson =

American academic, writer and poet

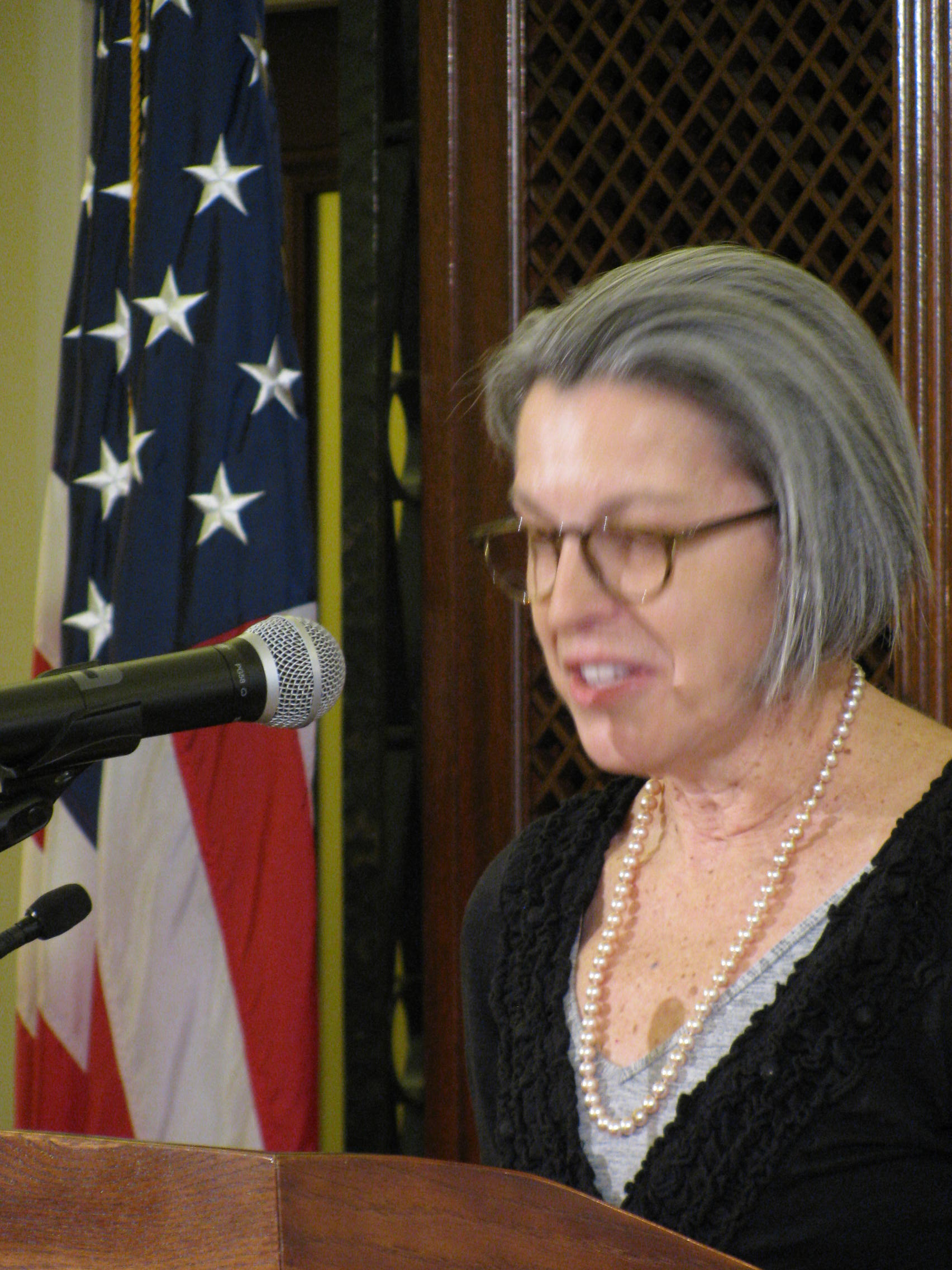
- Born: January 13, 1957; Chatham, Virginia, U.S.
- Died: December 4, 2014 (aged 57); Richmond, Virginia, U.S.
- Education: University of Virginia (BA); University of North Carolina, Greensboro (MFA)
- Occupations: Poet, professor
- Spouse: Kent Ippolito (m. 2000)
- Awards: Pulitzer Prize for Poetry (2006); Poet Laureate of Virginia (2008–10); Guggenheim Fellowship (2011)

Claudia Emerson (January 13, 1957 – December 4, 2014) was an American poet. She won the 2006 Pulitzer Prize for Poetry for her collection Late Wife, and was named the Poet Laureate of Virginia by Governor Tim Kaine in 2008.

== Early life ==
Emerson was born on January 13, 1957, in Chatham, Virginia, and graduated from Chatham Hall, a preparatory school, in 1975. She received her BA in English from the University of Virginia in 1979 and her Master of Fine Arts in creative writing at the University of North Carolina at Greensboro in 1991.

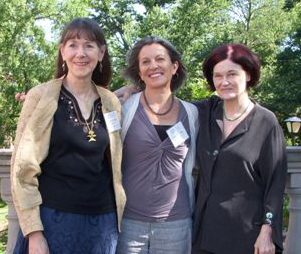
Virginia Poets Laureate at University of Mary Washington Reunion Day, June 3, 2011. Carolyn Kreiter-Foronda (2006–2008), Claudia Emerson (2008–2010), and Kelly Cherry (2010–2012)

== Career ==
Emerson published eight poetry collections through Louisiana State University Press's Southern Messenger Poets series: Pharaoh, Pharaoh (1997), Pinion: An Elegy (2002), Late Wife (2005), Figure Studies: Poems (2008), Secure the Shadow (2012), The Opposite House (2015), Impossible Bottle (2015), and Claude Before Time and Space (2018).

Three collections were published posthumously, The Opposite House (March 2015), Impossible Bottle (September 2015) and Claude Before Time and Space (February 2018).

In addition to her collections, Emerson's work has been included in such anthologies as Yellow Shoe Poets, The Made Thing, Strongly Spent: 50 Years of Shenandoah Poetry, and Common Wealth: Contemporary Poets of Virginia.

Emerson served as poetry editor for the Greensboro Review and a contributing editor for the literary magazine Shenandoah. In 2002, Emerson was Guest Editor of Visions-International (published by Black Buzzard Press). On August 26, 2008, she was appointed Poet Laureate of Virginia, by then Governor Tim Kaine and served until 2010. In 2008, she returned to Chatham Hall to serve as The Siragusa Foundation's Poet-in-Residence.

She taught at several colleges including Washington and Lee University in Lexington, Virginia and Randolph-Macon College in Ashland, Virginia. She spent over a decade at the University of Mary Washington, in Fredericksburg, Virginia, as an English professor and the Arrington Distinguished Chair in Poetry.

In 2013, Emerson joined the creative writing faculty at Virginia Commonwealth University in Richmond, Virginia, where she taught until her death in 2014 from colon cancer at age 57.

== Personal life ==
Emerson married musician Kent Ippolito in 2000. The couple lived in Richmond, Virginia, and performed and wrote songs together. After missing most of the Fall 2014 semester while seeking cancer treatments, Claudia Emerson died on December 4, 2014, in Richmond at the age of 57 from complications associated with colon cancer.

== Awards and honors ==
- The Association of Writers and Writing Programs Intro Award, 1991
- Academy of American Poets Prize, 1991
- National Endowment for the Arts Fellowship, 1994 (As Claudia Emerson Andrews)
- Virginia Commission for the Arts Individual Artist Fellowship, 1995 and 2002
- University of Mary Washington Alumni Association Outstanding Young Faculty Award, 2003
- Erskine J. Poetry Prize, 2004 for "Second Bearing, 1919"
- Witter Bynner Fellowship from Library of Congress, 2005
- Pulitzer Prize for Poetry, 2006
- Poet Laureate of Virginia, 2008–2010
- Library of Virginia, Virginia Women in History, 2009
- Fellowship of Southern Writers, Inaugural Winner, Donald Justice Award for Poetry, 2009
- Guggenheim Fellowship, 2011
- Elected to Membership, Fellowship of Southern Writers, 2011

== Bibliography ==
=== Poetry collections ===
- Pharaoh, Pharaoh. LSU Press. 1997. ISBN 978-0807121597.
- Pinion, An Elegy. LSU Press. 2002. ISBN 978-0-8071-2766-7.
- Late Wife: Poems. LSU Press. 2005. ISBN 978-0-8071-3083-4.
- Figure Studies: Poems. LSU Press. 2008. ISBN 978-0-8071-3361-3.
- Secure the Shadow: Poems. LSU Press. 2012. ISBN 978-0-8071-4303-2.
- The Opposite House. LSU Press. 2015. ISBN 978-0-8071-5848-7.
- Impossible Bottle. LSU Press. 2015. ISBN 978-0-8071-6083-1.
- Claude Before Time and Space. LSU Press. 2018. ISBN 978-0807167861.

=== List of poems ===
Title	Year	First published	Reprinted/collected
Early Elegy: Barber	2013	Emerson, Claudia (January 28, 2013). "Early Elegy: Barber". The New Yorker. Vol. 88, no. 45. p. 36.	
