= List of writers' halls of fame =

This is a list of writers' halls of fame. Institutions in at least five U.S. states have each created a program explicitly named as a "Hall of Fame" for writers, and there are at least two national-level programs focused on genres of writing also named as halls of fame. In addition, there are a number of annual awards for authors programs not using "Hall of Fame" in their name but which are likewise focused on complete, life-long bodies of work; the cumulative lists of awardees of these, especially if systematic and publicized by the awarding body, may be considered to constitute a hall of fame and to be included here.

The goals of these programs are generally to increase public awareness of important writers, especially those associated with a given geographical area or literary genre, and to honor the authors included. These are given for achievements of substantial collected works of writing, not for individual novels, scripts, poems, or other individual works. This list does not include certain awards naming promising "Early" or "Mid-Career" authors, or aiming to further authors' development (such as the Windham–Campbell Literature Prizes (2011) that gives large financial sums "to provide writers the opportunity to focus on their work independent of financial concerns"). Nor does this list include "lifetime achievement awards" which are occasionally but not systematically awarded by an awards program (for example the Academy Awards' Academy Honorary Award or Special Achievement Academy Award which might honor a screenwriter's lifetime achievements).

Unlike the Nobel Prize in Literature (1901), persons may be named after their death, in some of these. Unlike the Pulitzer Prizes for literature or journalism, or the Newbery Medal for children's literature, these awards are not focused upon a single work published.

Unlike, say the Academy Awards, the writers nominated might not be present at an awards ceremony for many of these. The award is an honor that may be appreciated, but nominees might not be expected or pressured to attend. The University of Georgia Libraries' example is one where living author arwardees would be invited to campus to give a speech, and creators of the program hoped it would attract donors.

John D'Agata, in his book Halls of Fame: Essays (2001) commented on the phenomenon of halls of fame. Per a review of the book, "In these refreshingly bold, creative, and incisive essays, John D'Agata journeys the endless corridors of American's myriad halls of fame and faithfully reports on what he finds there. In a voice all his own, he brilliantly maps his terrain in lists, collage, and ludic narratives."

Halls of fame for writers which appear to meet these criteria include (ordered by year of founding):

== Songwriters Hall of Fame (1969) ==
The Songwriters Hall of Fame was founded in 1969. See List of Songwriters Hall of Fame inductees.

== Nashville Songwriters Hall of Fame (1970) ==
The Nashville Songwriters Hall of Fame was established in 1970 by the Nashville Songwriters Foundation, Inc.

== National Literary Hall of Fame for Writers of African Descent (1988) ==
The Chicago State University inaugurated the National Literary Hall of Fame for Writers of African Descent in 1988 with 39 initial inductions. In 1999, the audience "buzzed" when one of the 30 inductees was announced to be Studs Terkel. Professor Haki Madhubuti "pointed out that Studs 'is not part of the black community’s genealogical line but its psychological line.', to their relief.

== Nevada Writers Hall of Fame (1988) ==
The Nevada Writers Hall of Fame has given annual awards since 1988.

== Michigan Author Award (1992) ==
The Michigan Library Association has named one author per year for the Michigan Author Award since 1992 for their collective works ("an outstanding published body of fiction, nonfiction, poetry, or play script").

== Georgia Writers Hall of Fame (2000) ==
The Georgia Writers Hall of Fame was established in 2000 by the University of Georgia Libraries. Writers are eligible for nomination if they were born in Georgia or if they produced an important work while living in the state. It was hoped that the program "would attract donors by bringing living authors to campus and celebrating those of the past; also the ceremony and exhibits, ideally growing each year, could draw in funds for the Libraries' much-needed new buildings and its endowments, along with opening up possibilities for cultural programs and attracting additional writers (or their estates) who might choose to house their archives."

== Indiana Authors Awards (2009) ==
The Indiana Authors Awards, also known as the "Eugene and Marilyn Glick Indiana Authors Awards", was started in 2009. Through 2022, it has given 26 awards based on authors' lifetime bodies of work.

== New York State Writers Hall of Fame (2010) ==
The New York State Writers Hall of Fame was established in 2010 "to highlight the rich literary heritage of the New York State and to recognize the legacy of individual New York State writers."

== Kentucky Writers Hall of Fame (2013) ==
The Kentucky Writers Hall of Fame was begun in 2013 by the Carnegie Center for Literacy and Learning, a Lexington, Kentucky institution. and on January 24, 2013, the inaugural class was inducted.

Selected news coverage includes coverage by KTVQ and WUKY in 2022.

KYWHOF inductees are:

- 2013: Harriette Arnow, William Wells Brown, Harry Caudill, Elizabeth Madox Roberts, James Still, and Robert Penn Warren
- 2014: Rebecca Caudill, Thomas D. Clark, Janice Holt Giles, James Baker Hall, Etheridge Knight, Thomas Merton, and Jesse Stuart.
- 2015: Guy Davenport, Elizabeth Hardwick, Jim Wayne Miller, Effie Waller Smith, Hunter S. Thompson, and the first living writer inducted into the Hall of Fame, Wendell Berry (b. 1934).
- 2016: Bobbie Ann Mason, Harlan Hubbard, James Lane Allen, Alice Hegan Rice, Jean Ritchie
- 2017: Irvin S. Cobb, Joseph Seamon Cotter, Sr., A. B. Guthrie, Jr., Gayl Jones, Barbara Kingsolver
- 2018: Annie Fellows Johnston, bell hooks (1952 – 2021), John Fox, Jr., Walter Tevis
- 2019: Ed McClanahan (1932 – 2021), Gurney Norman (b. 1937), Alice Dunnigan (1906 – 1983), Jane Gentry (1863 – 1925), Sue Grafton (1940 – 2017), Helen Thomas (1920 – 2013)
- 2020: Cleanth Brooks (1906 – 1994), Lucy Furman (1870 – 1958), Hollis Summers (1916 – 1987), Sam Shepard (1943 – 2017), Sena Jeter Naslund (b.1942)
- 2021: Nikky Finney (b.1957), John Egerton (1935 — 2013), Robert K. Massie (1929 – 2019), John Jacob Niles (1892 – 1980), Caroline Gordon (1895 – 1981), Albert Stewart
- 2022: George Ella Lyon (b. 1949), James C. Klotter (living), Loyal Jones (writer and teacher of Appalachia, Berea College, About Loyal Jones), Ted Poston (1906 – 1974), Robert Hazel (1921 – 1993)
- 2023: Madison Cawein, Blanche Taylor Dickinson, Marsha Norman, Suzan-Lori Parks, Richard Taylor

Thus living writers include:

- Wendell Berry (b. 1934), born in, and later based in, Henry County, Kentucky
- George Ella Lyon (b. 1949, in Harlan, Kentucky), a Kentucky Poet Laureate
- James C. Klotter, a State Historian of Kentucky
- Nikky Finney (b. 1957), the Guy Davenport Endowed Professor of English at the University of Kentucky for twenty years.
- Sena Jeter Naslund (b.1942), the writer in residence at University of Louisville and the program director for the MFA in Writing at Spalding University in the same city. In 2005, Governor Ernie Fletcher named Naslund Poet Laureate of Kentucky
- Gurney Norman (b. 1937)

Also, since-deceased:

- 2018: bell hooks (1952 – 2021), Distinguished Professor in Residence at Berea College.
- 2019: Ed McClanahan (1932 – 2021) M.A. at and later taught at the University of Kentucky, also taught at Northern Kentucky University

These all seem to have significant Kentucky connections.

== Latin Songwriters Hall of Fame (2013) ==
The Latin Songwriters Hall of Fame was founded in 2013 in Florida by two songwriters.

== Authors' Hall of Fame (Colorado, 2019) ==
The Colorado Authors Hall of Fame "celebrates the accomplishments of living and passed authors that have been connected to Colorado". Its all-volunteer-run 501c3, founded in 2014, had inductions in 2019 and 2021.

2021 inductees were:

Living authors:
- Kathleen O'Neal Gear, writer of historical fiction, science fiction, fantasy, non-fiction
- Kevin J. Anderson, writer in science fiction and fantasy genres
- Penny Rafferty Hamilton, writer of aviation, Western history, women's history
- Justin Matott, children's writing
- Sandra Dallas, fiction and nonfiction
- Carol Fenster, gluten-free cooking
- W. Michael Gear, historical fiction, science fiction, fantasy, westerns, non-fiction
- Charlotte Hinger, fiction and non-fiction
- Manuel Ramos, novelist, one of first Latinos in mystery genre
- Patricia Raybon, novelist about faith and race
- Richard "Dick" Weissman, writer about music and the music business, from a musician’s point of view, try Richard Weissman
- Flint Whitlock, military historian
- "Avi", or Edward Irving Wortis

Legacy authors:
- Robert Heinlein (1907 – 1988), "dean of science fiction"
- James Michener (1907 – 1997), novelist
- John Edward Williams (1922 – 1994), novelist
- Hannah Marie Wormington (1914 – 1994), anthropologist try H. Marie Wormington

Lifetime Achievement Award
- Sue Lubeck (d. 2021) Not an author, but rather an independent businesswoman who created and nurtured the Bookies Bookstore

== Romance Writers of America Hall of Fame (retired) ==
The Romance Writers of America's Romance Writers of America Hall of Fame honored romance writers who were three-time winners of the RITA Award in the same category, for "recognized excellence in published romance novels and novellas". The RITA Award, and hence also its Hall of Fame, was retired in 2020, after controversies. The year of awardees' third or fourth qualifying novels ranged from 1994 to 2015.

It was awarded 18 times to 16 separate persons (Nora Roberts won in three separate categories):

- Jo Beverley
- Kresley Cole
- Kathleen Creighton
- Justine Dare
- Jennifer Greene
- Irene Hannon
- Kathleen Korbel
- Barbara O'Neal
- Susan Elizabeth Phillips
- Julia Quinn
- Francine Rivers
- Nora Roberts
- LaVyrle Spencer
- Karen Templeton
- Jodi Thomas and
- Cheryl Zach

== Women Songwriters Hall of Fame (2021) ==
The Women Songwriters Hall of Fame (WSHOF) is a non profit organization founded, by entrepreneur, songwriter Dr. Janice McLean DeLoatch, to honor female songwriters, composers, and artists from around the world who have made significant contributions to the music industry.

2021 inductees and Honorees:

- Tawatha Agee
- Mary Chapin Carpenter
- Jekalyn Carr
- Roberta Flack
- The Go-Go's
- Dr. Veryl Howard
- Bunny Hull
- Naomi Judd
- Klymaxx
- Dawnn Lewis
- Valerie Simpson
- Deniece Williams

Lifetime Achievement and Legacy Award

- Cynthia Biggs
- Dee Dee Sharp

2022 inductees and Honorees:

- Marilyn Bergman
- Doe
- Gloria Estefan
- Siedah Garrett
- Indigo Girls
- Loretta Lynn
- Rose Marie McCoy
- Jody Watley
- Junko Yagami

2023 inductees and Honorees:

- Toni Basil
- Angela Bofill
- Ann Hampton Callaway
- Jan Daley
- Olivia Newton-John
- Dorothy Norwood
- Scherrie Payne
- Jasmine Sandlas
- Pam Sawyer
- Cynthia Weil

Lifetime Achievement and Legacy Award

- Dean Claudia Bornholdt
- Alyze Elyse
- Freda Payne

2024 inductees and Honorees:

- Maria Callas
- LaLa Cope
- Martha Munizzi
- Soon Hee Newbold
- Angie Stone
- Crystal Waters
- Allee Willis

Educator of the Year

- Dr. Shakenna K. Williams

== Missouri Writers Hall of Fame ==
The Missouri Writers Hall of Fame is a nonprofit institution, less salient than some others. See Writers Hall of Fame, Facebook page for the Missouri organization.
