= James Madison (disambiguation) =

James Madison (1751–1836) was a Founding Father of the United States and served as its fourth president from 1809 to 1817.

James Madison may also refer to:

- James Madison Sr. (1723–1801), American farmer and entrepreneur
- James Madison (bishop) (1749–1812), American bishop
- James Madison (Medal of Honor) (1842–1926), United States Army sergeant and Medal of Honor recipient
- James Jonas Madison (1884–1922), American sailor & Medal of Honor recipient
- James Madison (born 1956/57), American bank robber a.k.a. the Mad Hatter
- James Madison (musician) (1935–2008), known as James "Pee Wee" Madison, the blues guitar player in Muddy Waters' band
- James Madison (writer) (1872–1943), American writer and publisher of Madison's Budget
- James S. Madison (1846–1892), Mississippi politician
- James H. Madison, American writer

== See also ==
- James Maddison (born 1996), English footballer
- James Madison University, a university located in Harrisonburg, Virginia
- James Madison Dukes, the university's athletic program
- Jimmy Madison (disambiguation)
- USS James Madison, several ships
