= Näslund =

Näslund is a Swedish surname. Notable people with the surname include:

- Bertil Näslund (1933–2016), Swedish economist
- Israel Israelsson Näslund (1796–1858), Swedish vicar of Ytterlännäs parish
- Markus Näslund (born 1973), Swedish ice hockey player
- Mats Näslund (born 1959), Swedish ice hockey player
- Patrik Näslund (born 1992), Swedish professional ice hockey player
- Sandra Näslund (born 1996), Swedish freestyle skier
- Sena Jeter Naslund (born 1942), American writer
- Totta Näslund (1945–2005), Swedish musician
- Viktor Näslund (born 1992), Swedish professional ice hockey player
