= Oceanic (poetry collection) =

Poetry collection by Aimee Nezhukumatathil

- Author: Aimee Nezhukumatathil
- Genre: Poetry
- Publisher: Copper Canyon Press
- Publication date: April 10, 2018
- Pages: 82
- ISBN: 978-1-55659-526-4

Oceanic is a 2018 poetry collection by Aimee Nezhukumatathil, published by Copper Canyon Press.

== Form ==
Nezhukumatathil's fourth, the poetry collection studies love and interconnection through the natural world, drawing on subjects including marine biology, pop music, mythology, and motherhood.

In an interview with PBS NewsHour, Nezhukumatathil discussed her lifelong fascination with earth science and the outdoors, and in a conversation with the Brooklyn Rail, she described her interest in "how the natural world can teach us about our own emotions and relationships."

== Critical reception ==
Publishers Weekly praised the book's connected feeling, writing that Nezhukumatathil "weaves meditations on parenting and family-making among her lavishly rendered evocations of flora and fauna" and that "her voice is consistent in its awe."

Library Journal recommended it "for all poetry readers, especially those interested in ecopoetry," stating that Nezhukumatathil "writes with a romantic sensibility about a world saturated with a deep sense of loss."

The Rumpus called it "[Nezhukumatathil's] strongest, most confident writing yet," "much more than a love letter to the ocean," and "a celebration of nature and of life itself."

The Georgia Review called it both a love letter to and a warning about ecological interdependence, praising how Nezhukumatathil "upends conventional notions of both what power looks like and what safety means."

Ploughshares called it important both for its poetics but also its interrogation of the natural world's precarity.

Poetry Northwest praised the collection as "Nezhukumatathil's...best yet," highlighting "her mastery of sensory detail, prowess at synthesizing memories with insight, and her observations and impressive knowledge of the natural world."

Poemeleon praised its "confident, clear voice" and "exquisite" self-portraiture poems.
