= Vespertine =

Vespertine may refer to:

- Vespertine (biology), a biological term
- Vespertine (album), a 2001 music album by Björk
  - Vespertine world tour, a concert tour by Björk
  - Vespertine Live, a 2004 live music album by Björk
- Vespertine (restaurant), a Michelin-starred restaurant in Culver City, California, United States
- The Vespertine, a 2011 novel by Saundra Mitchell
