= Alien Invasion Arizona =

- Directed by: Dustin Rikert
- Written by: Dustin Rikert; Soon Hee Newbold
- Produced by: Dustin Rikert; Soon Hee Newbold; Philip Tiboni
- Starring: Daniel Southworth; Avery Clyde; Sam McConkey; James McBride
- Cinematography: Brian Lataille
- Edited by: Tchavdar Georgiev
- Music by: Carl Rydlund
- Distributed by: Lionsgate
- Release date: April 17, 2007
- Running time: 87 minutes
- Country: United States
- Language: English

Alien Invasion Arizona is a 2007 science fiction film directed by Dustin Rikert and starring Daniel Southworth, Avery Clyde, Sam McConkey, and James McBride. It is set in the fictional town of Salena, Arizona. It is also entitled The Salena Incident and was a straight to DVD release produced by and distributed by Lionsgate.

== Plot ==
After a mysterious, extraterrestrial object crashes in the mining town of Salena, Arizona, the government dispatches a team of Marines to contain the possible threat. Meanwhile, a group of death row inmates ambush their prison bus and take the guards hostage. The criminals include Brando, from the Italian Mafia, Colburn, an African-American gangster, Alano, a Hispanic gang member, and a Neo-Nazi skinhead named Albany. Arriving in the seemingly deserted town, they come across Special Ops Captain Bradley, the sole survivor of a horrible carnage that decimated the rest of his unit. With time running out, the group puts their differences and racial prejudices aside to combat the threat of the savage aliens hunting them in the mining tunnels below and the peril above from a squad of fighter planes sent to bomb the town to oblivion.

== Cast ==
- Daniel Southworth ...Captain John Bradley
- Avery Clyde ...Dr. Taylor Kacey
- Sam McConkey ...Kevin Porter
- James McBride ...Brando Enzio
- Larry 'Tank' Jones ...Colburn Waylon
- Paulino Hemmer ...Alano Martinez
- Joseph Moore ...Albany Gavin
- Robert Harter ...Mark Colby
- Philip Tiboni ...Larry Kendall
- Shannon Alexander ...Adreana Cammeo
- Cathy Rankin ...Gia Dante
- Wade Rikert ...Eddie Thompson
- Brendan Guy Murphy ...Vincent Enzio
- Soon Hee Newbold ...Cindi Lee
- Robert Lennon ...Rock Sanders
- Patrick Logan Pace ...Kyle Matthewson

== Film location ==
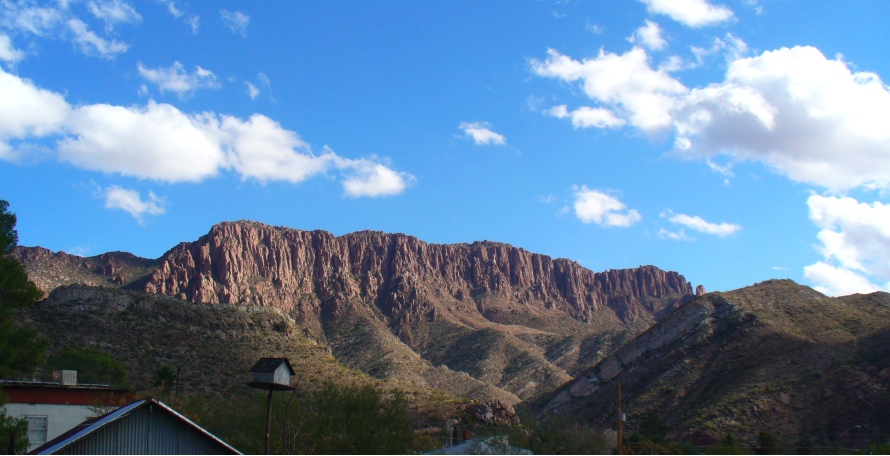
Apache Leap in Superior

While the film is set in fictional Salena, Arizona, many of the scenes are actually filmed in real-life Superior, Arizona. Shots of the town and surrounding area are seen throughout the film.

The film depicts a prison in Salena, but the town of Superior does not have a prison. The building used in the film for the prison is actually an old elementary school.
