= April Pulley Sayre =

American children's book author

April Pulley Sayre (April 11, 1966 — November 6, 2021) was an American children's book author from the 1990s to 2020s. Before becoming an author, Sayre worked at the National Wildlife Federation and National Geographic Society. Sayre published series on the biomes and continents between 1994 and 2003. She expanded into picture books during 1995. With her picture books, Sayre primarily wrote about animals while also writing about food and the weather.

Sayre was on the ALA Notable lists three times during both the 2000s and 2010s. Additional lists Sayre's books appeared on during this time period include the International Reading Association and National Science Teaching Association. From the American Association for the Advancement of Science, Sayre won the Children's Science Picture Book category as part of the 2006 AAAS/Subaru Prize for Excellence in Science Books with Stars Beneath Your Bed. She received the Theodor Seuss Geisel Honor for Vulture View in 2008. At the Indiana Authors Awards, Sayre won the Genre Excellence category during 2016.

== Early life and education ==
April Pulley's birth occurred at Greenville, South Carolina on April 11, 1966. Pulley became interested in literature and nature while living with her two siblings during her childhood. Growing up, she provided the pill bugs for her family's educational toys. Pulley "wrote bedtime stories for her pet rock" as a student. She had asthma until it stopped during her teenage years. By 2000, April Pulley Sayre completed her post-secondary education at Duke University and Vermont College. For her programs, she studied science and writing.

== Career ==
During the late 1980s, Pulley worked at the National Wildlife Federation and National Geographic Society as an intern before her marriage. In 1988, Pulley started a three-year position as an associate editor with the NWF. The year after, Pulley wrote a primatologist biography that did not get published. When April Pulley Sayre began re-experiencing asthma in 1990, she created Team A with her husband and wrote about childhood asthma. In the early 1990s, Sayre wanted to work in biology during her writing career. From 1994 to 2003, Sayre published one series of books on the biomes and two series on the continents.

She expanded into picture books in 1995 after being inspired during an authors' conference. By the late 1990s, Sayre had written poetry that was private. Up to 2018, Sayre primarily wrote about animals in over forty books. Some of these animals were the hummingbird, bumblebee and squirrel. Other topics Sayre wrote about include the weather and food.

As a fiction writer, Sayre released Noodle Man, The Pasta Superhero in 2002. For her husband's co-authored book in 2015 titled Kaufman Field Guide to Nature of the Midwest, Sayre helped conducted plant research during the 2010s. That year, Sayre created The Indiana Chant for the 200th anniversary of the state. By the time of her death in 2021, she had "created more than 80 books for young readers".

== Writing process and themes ==
To create her publications, Sayre conducted research before starting the writing process. Some places she visited for her books include the Galapagos Islands and Madagascar. Her books took a minimum total of one combined year to complete the planning and publication stages. In 2004, Sayre stated she was "rejected probably 500 times" during her writing career.

For her books, she focused on making them sound good when read out loud. Sayre released Secrets of Sound: Studying the Calls and Song of Whales, Elephants, and Birds after she used onomatopoeia in multiple publications. During the 2010s, she included photos that she took in her publications.

== Awards and honors ==
In 2001, Sayre became a multiple recipient on the John Burroughs List of Nature Books for Young Readers from the John Burroughs Association. That year, her book Splash! Splash! Animal Baths was a Children's Choice for the International Reading Association. With the American Library Association, three of her books were on the ALA Notable lists in the 2000s. She was on these ALA lists three more times during the 2010s. With Vulture View, Sayre was given a Theodor Seuss Geisel Honor in 2008.

From the American Association for the Advancement of Science, Stars Beneath Your Bed received the AAAS/Subaru Prize for Excellence in Science Books for the Children's Science Picture Book category in 2006. During the 2010s, her books were chosen as Outstanding Science Trade Books for Students K–12 multiple times by the National Science Teaching Association in 2014 and 2017. Sayre won the Genre Excellence category as part of the Indiana Authors Awards in 2016.

== Personal life and death ==
In 1996, Sayre moved to South Bend, Indiana and lived there until her 2021 death. Sayre had breast cancer before her death during November 6, 2021.
