= Brooke O'Harra =

American dramatist

Brooke O'Harra is an American director, playwright, performer and (with composer Brendan Connelly), co-founder of the Obie Award winning Theater of a Two-headed Calf.

O'Harra developed and directed all 14 of Two-headed Calf's productions including the Obie Award-winning Drum of the Waves of Horikawa (2007, HERE Arts Center), It Cannot Be Called Our Mother but Our Graves a.k.a Macbeth (Soho Rep Lab, 2008-09), Trifles (Ontological Hysteric Incubator, 2010), and the opera project You, My Mother (2012 at La Mama ETC, 2013 in the River to River Festival).

== Appearances on Reality Television ==
- A Dating Story, Episode 110: Jason, Brooke and Ross
