= Susan Neville =

American writer, essayist and professor (born 1951)

- Born: January 4, 1951 (age 75); Indianapolis, Indiana, United States
- Education: B.A.: DePauw University, M.F.A. Bowling Green State University
- Occupations: Writer; professor
- Spouse: Ken Neville
- Writing career
- Notable works: In the House of Blue Lights, Invention of Flight
- Notable awards: Richard Sullivan Prize, Flannery O'Connor Award for Short Fiction
- Website: www.susan-neville.com

Susan Neville (born January 4, 1951, in Indianapolis, Indiana) is a short story writer, essayist and professor, known for her work exploring Indiana and the Midwest.

== Life ==
She graduated from DePauw University in 1973. In 1976, she graduated from Bowling Green State University with an M.F.A. She taught at St. Petersburg Junior College, Ball State University, and Indiana University East. She teaches at Butler University and the Warren Wilson Program for Writers in North Carolina.

She lives in Indianapolis, Indiana.

== Awards ==
- Two National Endowment for the Arts Literature Fellowships for Creative Writing (1978 and 1988)
- Richard Sullivan prize for In the House of Blue Lights
- 1984 Flannery O'Connor Award for Short Fiction for The Invention of Flight
- Winner of the 2019 Catherine Doctorow Prize for Innovative Fiction from Fiction Collective 2 for The Town of Whispering Dolls
- Winner of the 2022 Indiana Authors Award for Fiction for The Town of Whispering Dolls
- Winner of the 2024 Indiana Authors Award for Lifetime Achievement

== Works ==
=== Short story collections ===
- The Invention of Flight, University of Georgia Press, 1984, ISBN 9780820307060
- In the House of Blue Lights, University of Notre Dame Press, 1998, ISBN 9780268011833
- The Town of Whispering Dolls, University of Alabama: Fiction Collective Two, 2020, ISBN 9781573661850

=== Nonfiction ===
- Indiana Winter, Indiana University Press, 1994, ISBN 9780253208798
- Falling Toward Grace: Images of Religion and Culture, Indiana University Press, 1998, ISBN 9780253334534
- Twilight in Arcadia: Tobacco Farming in Indiana, Indiana Historical Society, 2000, ISBN 9780871951441
- Fabrication: Essays on Making Things and Making Meaning, MacMurray & Beck, 2001, ISBN 9781878448088
- Iconography: A Writer's Meditation, Indiana University Press, 2003, ISBN 9780253343222
- Sailing the Inland Sea, Quarry Books, 2007, ISBN 9780253348678
- Butler's Big Dance: The Team, The Tournament, and Basketball Fever, Indiana University Press, November 22, 2010, ISBN 9780253223128

=== Essays & stories online ===
- "Mystic vs. Maniac", O, the Oprah Magazine, May 2007
- "On Memoir", Essay Daily, December 1, 2016
- "Light", Image Journal
- "On Poetry and Music", Indiana Humanities, April 24, 2020
- "Grotto", Diagram, May 2016
- "Game Night", The Collagist, September 2016
- "Hunger", The Missouri Review, February 23, 2018

== Sources ==
- Butler University (2012), Full-Time Members of the English Department, archived from the original on November 2, 2012
- DePauw University (August 2009), "Susan Neville '73 & Prof. Greg Schwipps '95 are Finalists for Authors Awards", DePauw University
- Poets & Writers (June 2008), Susan Neville
