= Saundra Mitchell =

American novelist (born 1973)

- Born: September 3, 1973 (age 53)
- Occupation: Author
- Spouse: Jayne Walters

Saundra Mitchell (born September 3, 1973) is an American novelist who has also written under the pseudonyms of Jessa Holbrook and Alex Mallory.

== Career ==
Mitchell is a native of Indianapolis, Indiana. Mitchell wrote short stories in kindergarten, a play in fourth grade, and entries for her high school's literary magazine. She was kicked out of the U.S. Army in the early 1990s for being queer, after which she began writing scripts for a The Dreaming Tree, a small production company.

Mitchell worked as the head screenwriter and executive producer with Dreaming Tree Films for twenty years. Using her screenplays, the company produced more than 400 films. She has Academy Award eligibility ten times.

== Personal life ==
Mitchell is gay and has daughters. She is married to her wife, Jayne Walters, whom she met online and is transgender. Walters was the first openly transgender manager at the Indianapolis Public Library.

In 2023, after Indiana state lawmakers passed laws banning books deemed "obscene" or "harmful to students" in school libraries and banning gender-affirming care for minors, Mitchell moved from Indiana to Maryland. She later participated in protests against the U.S. Supreme Court's decision in Mahmoud v. Taylor, which overturned Montgomery County Public Schools's policy of not allowing opt-outs of instruction involving LGBTQ-inclusive storybooks.

== Selected accolades ==
Year	Work	Accolades	Result	Ref.
2009	Shadowed Summer	Junior Library Guild book list	Selection	
2010	Shadowed Summer	Edgar Award for Best Young Adult Mystery	Finalist	
2010	Shadowed Summer	Society of Midland Authors Award for Best Children's Book	Winner	
2020	All the Things We Do in the Dark	Lambda Literary Award for Children's and Young Adult Literature	Finalist	
2020	All the Things We Do in the Dark	Junior Library Guild book list	Selection	
2020	All the Things We Do in the Dark	Indiana Authors Award for Best Young Adult Novel	Winner	

== Publications ==
=== Fiction ===
==== Standalone novels ====
- Shadowed Summer (2009)
- Breathkept (2011)
- Defy the Dark (2013)
- While You're Away, as Jessa Holbrook (2013)
- Wild, as Alex Mallory (2014)
- Mistwalker (2014)
- All the Things We Do in the Dark (2019)
- The Prom: A Novel Based on the Hit Broadway Musical, with Chad Beguelin, Bob Martin, and Matthew Sklar (2019)

==== The Vespertine series ====
- The Vespertine (2011)
- The Springsweet (2012)
- The Elementals (2013)

==== Camp Murderface series ====
- Camp Murderface, with Josh Berk (2020)
- Doom in the Deep, with Josh Berk (2021)

=== Nonfiction ===
- 50 Unbelievable Women and Their Fascinating (and True!) Stories (2016)
- 50 Impressive Kids and Their Amazing (and True!) Stories (2016)

=== Short stories ===
- "" in Lightspeed Magazine (September 2014)

=== Anthologies ===
- Love And Sacrifice: Touching Stories About Troubled Relationships (2007)
- Truth and Dare: 20 Tales of Heartbreak and Happiness (2011)
- The First Time (2011)
- Grim (2014)
- A Tyranny of Petticoats (2016)
- All Out: The No-Longer-Secret Stories of Queer Teens throughout the Ages (2018)
- Foreshadow: A Serial YA Anthology of Short Stories (2019)
- You Too?: 25 Voices Share Their #MeToo Stories (2020)
- Out Now: Queer We Go Again! (2020)
- Out There: Into the Queer New Yonder (2022)
- Transmogrify! (2023)

== Filmography ==
=== Films ===
- Alternate Universe: A Rescue Mission (2016)

=== Shorts ===
- Operation Daylight (2004)
- Requiem (2004)
- Going Down to Neverland (2004)
- World of Weird (2004)
- The War (2004)
- Warehouse (2005)
- Last Time We Met (2005)
- Moments of Grace (2005)
- The Otis Revue (2005)
- Curtain Call (2005)
- Goodbye, Howard (2005)
- Bargain Basement (2005)
- TTYL (2005)
- Given This Day (2005)
- Wash (2005)
- Ringing of the Belles (2010)
- K-Run FM (2010)
- Justice (2011)

=== TV Series ===
- Gwen's World of Weird (2017)
