= All the Things We Do in the Dark =

2019 young adult novel by Saundra Mitchell

- Author: Saundra Mitchell
- Language: English
- Genre: Young adult novel; Psychological thriller; Mystery novel
- Publisher: HarperTeen
- Publication date: October 29, 2019
- Awards: Lambda Literary Award for Children's and Young Adult Literature shortlist
- ISBN: 9780062852595

All the Things We Do in the Dark is a young adult psychological thriller novel by Saundra Mitchell, published October 29, 2019 by HarperTeen. The book was shortlisted for the Lambda Literary Award for Children's and Young Adult Literature.

== Background ==
In her author’s notes, Mitchell emphasizes the ethical responsibility in portraying sexual violence, as she was unwilling to “[add] one more fictional rape to a world that uses it far too often for entertainment.” Reviews highlighted that Mitchell's author's note includes contact information for sexual assault helplines.

== Summary ==
Because the story covers content that may be triggering for readers who are trauma survivors, the novel includes a trigger warning and resources. The novel follows 17-year-old Ava, who experienced a sexual assault in her childhood, after she finds a woman's corpse in the woods. Instead of reporting to the police, Ava "protect[s] and care[s] for her," enlisting the help of the victim's friend to solve the case. Most characters are Caucasian with the exception of the main character's lover being Jewish and part-Korean.

== Reception ==
Reviews note that the novel features a gripping, “roller-coaster” plot drawn from Mitchell's own experiences, weaving together concepts such as psychological trauma, mental struggle, mystery, melodrama, teenage friendships, and first love. Although the dark and suspenseful plot keeps readers guessing until the very end, reviews claim that the narrative itself conveys hope and strength born from the protagonist's growth as she ultimately rises above the experiences she endured.

Kirkus Reviews referred to the novel as a "searing, fast-paced whodunit that addresses sexual assault head-on," while Booklist called it an "insightful, cathartic read." Booklist further highlighted how "Mitchell mixes contemporary drama—the joy of first love, the pain of breaking friendships—with psychological thriller."

All the Things We Do in the Dark received a starred review from Publishers Weekly. It was shortlisted for the Lambda Literary Award for Children's and Young Adult Literature.

=== Censorship ===
As of October 2026, thirty-three schools and libraries have listed the novel on ban lists.

Between January and July 2023, the novel was among several titles challenged in Spotsylvania County Public Schools in Virginia. A community member filed objections to the book for containing mature themes, and the district temporarily removed it pending review. Although a committee recommended the title be retained, the superintendent ordered the removal of All the Things We Do in the Dark.

In February 2023, the Midland County Public Library in Texas moved the book to an adults-only section and removed it from nearby library systems following concerns about its depiction of gender and sexuality. In September 2023, the Collier County Public School Library in Florida restricted access to the book due to objections over its sexual content. In October 2023, All the Things We Do in the Dark was among the 93 books challenged in Berkeley County School District in South Carolina. Then, in December of 2023, Escambia County Public Schools in Florida removed over 1,600 titles from district libraries, which included All the Things We Do in the Dark.

According to the Banned Index, in March 2025, the novel was restricted in Nacogdoches Independent School District, TX. In April 2025, the novel was banned in Oak Ridge Schools, TN, and Citrus County School District, FL. In June 2025, the Hillsborough Country Public Schools and the Union County School district in Florida also banned the novel.

In January 2026, the novel was challenged in the Twin Falls School District, ID, by Cierra Clarke, founder of Moms for Liberty chapter in Twin Falls County.

In September 2026, the novel was removed in Escambia County Public Schools, FL, and Nassau County School District, FL.
