= Ross Gay =

American poet and professor (born 1974)

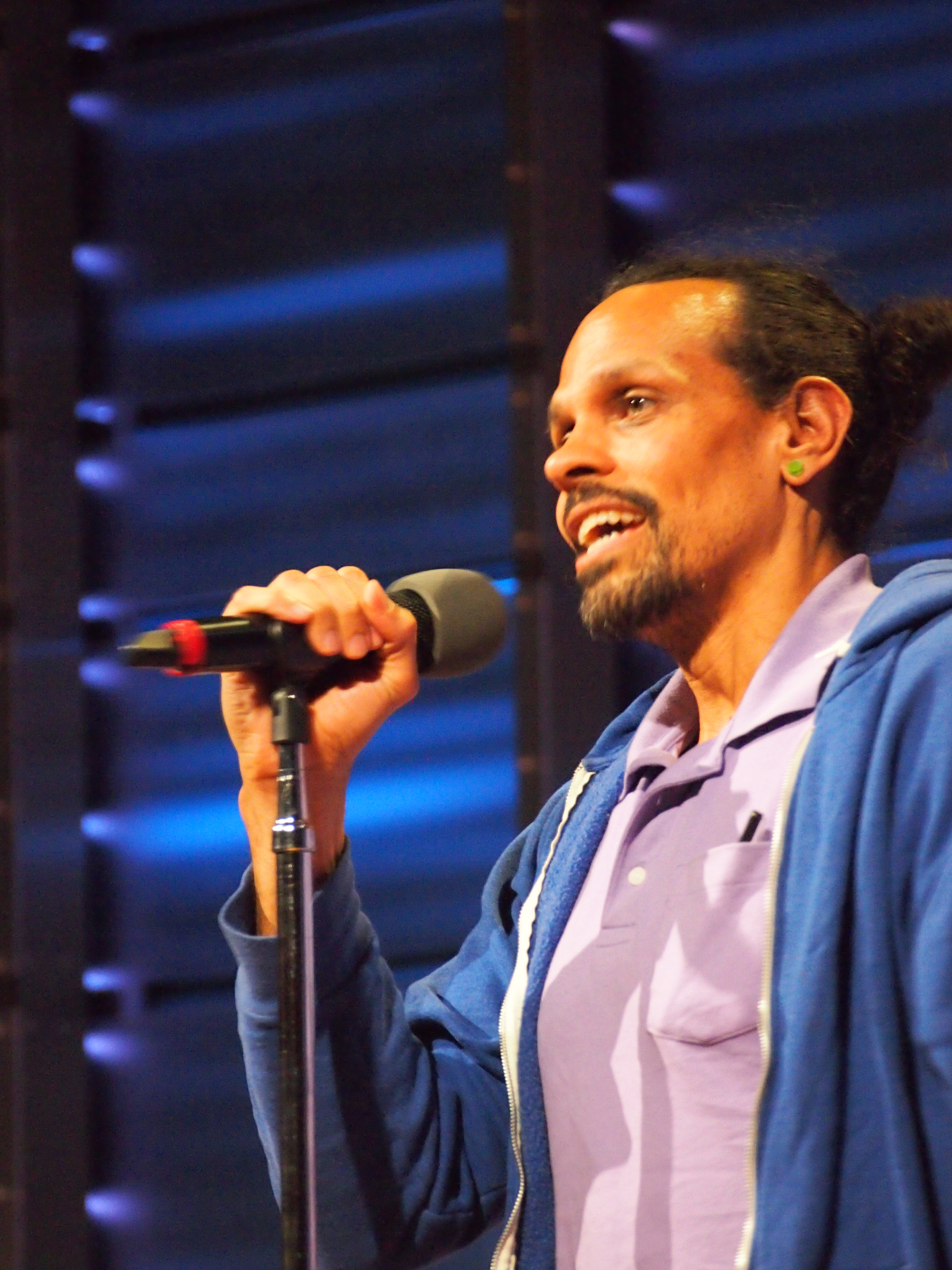
- Ross Gay at Split This Rock 2016
- Born: August 1, 1974 (age 52); Youngstown, Ohio, U.S.
- Education: Lafayette College, Sarah Lawrence College, Temple University
- Occupations: Professor, founding board member of the Bloomington Community Orchard
- Writing career
- Genre: Poetry
- Notable works: Against Which (2006), Bringing the Shovel Down (2011), Catalog of Unabashed Gratitude (2014)
- Notable awards: 2016 Kingsley Tufts Award, 2015 National Book Critics Circle Award in Poetry, 2015 National Book Award Finalist, 2015 Radcliffe Fellow, 2013 Guggenheim Fellow, Cave Canem Fellow
- Website: rossgay.net

Ross Gay (born August 1, 1974) is an American poet, essayist, and professor of English at Indiana University who won the National Book Critics Circle Award for Poetry and the Kingsley Tufts Poetry Award for his 2014 book Catalog of Unabashed Gratitude, which was also a finalist for the National Book Award for Poetry.

== Life ==
Ross Gay was born on August 1, 1974, in Youngstown, Ohio, but he grew up in Levittown, Pennsylvania.

He received his B.A. from Lafayette College, his MFA in poetry from Sarah Lawrence College, and his Ph.D. in American Literature from Temple University.

He is a founding editor, with Karissa Chen and Patrick Rosal, of the online sports magazine Some Call it Ballin'. He is also an editor with the chapbook presses Q Avenue and Ledge Mule Press. He is a founding board member of the Bloomington Community Orchard, a non-profit, free-fruit-for-all food justice and joy project.

He has taught poetry, art, and literature at Lafayette College in Easton, Pennsylvania, and Montclair State University in New Jersey. He now teaches at Indiana University Bloomington and the low-residency MFA in poetry program at Drew University.

His poems have appeared in literary journals and magazines including The American Poetry Review; Harvard Review; Columbia: A Journal of Poetry; Art, Margie: The American Journal of Poetry; and Atlanta Review. His poetry has also appeared in anthologies including From the Fishouse (Persea Books, 2009). His essays have appeared in The Paris Review.

His honors include being a Cave Canem Workshop fellow and a Bread Loaf Writers' Conference Tuition Scholar. He received a grant from the Pennsylvania Council of the Arts.

== Awards and honors ==
Year	Title	Award	Category	Result	Ref.
2015	Catalog of Unabashed Gratitude	National Book Award	Poetry	Shortlisted	
2015	Catalog of Unabashed Gratitude	National Book Critics Circle Award	Poetry	Won	
2016	Catalog of Unabashed Gratitude	The Kingsley and Kate Tufts Poetry Awards	Kingsley Tufts Poetry Award	Won	
2016	Catalog of Unabashed Gratitude	NAACP Image Awards	Poetry	Nominated	
2016	Catalog of Unabashed Gratitude	Ohioana Book Award	Poetry	Shortlisted	
2020	The Book of Delights	Indiana Authors Award	Nonfiction	Won	
2021	Be Holding: A Poem	Ohioana Book Award	Poetry	Shortlisted	
2021	Be Holding: A Poem	PEN/Jean Stein Book Award	—	Won	
2022	Be Holding: A Poem	Indiana Authors Award	Poetry	Won	
2023	Inciting Joy: Essays	Hurston/Wright Legacy Award	Memoir/Biography	Won	
2023	Inciting Joy: Essays	Ohioana Book Award	Nonfiction	Won	
2024	The Book of (More) Delights: Essays	Ohioana Book Award	Nonfiction	Shortlisted	

== Works ==
- Against Which. CavanKerry Press. October 2006. ISBN 9781933880006.
- Bringing the Shovel Down. University of Pittsburgh Press. January 23, 2011. ISBN 9780822991199.
- With Aimee Nezhukumatathil: Lace and Pyrite: Letters from Two Gardens. Organic Weapon Arts. 2014. ISBN 9780982710678.
- River. Monster House Press. December 1, 2014.
- Catalog of Unabashed Gratitude. University of Pittsburgh Press. January 16, 2015. ISBN 9780822963318.
- The Book of Delights: Essays. Algonquin Books. February 12, 2019. ISBN 9781616207922.
- Be Holding. University of Pittsburgh Press. September 8, 2020. ISBN 9780822966234.
- Inciting Joy: Essays. Algonquin Books. October 25, 2022. ISBN 9781643753041.
- The Book of (More) Delights: Essays. Algonquin Books. September 19, 2023. ISBN 9781643753096.

In anthology

- Melissa Tuckey, ed. (2018). Ghost Fishing: An Eco-Justice Poetry Anthology. University of Georgia Press. ISBN 9780820353159.

== Appearances on reality television shows ==
- A Dating Story, Episode 110: Jason, Brooke and Ross

== See also ==
- American poetry
- 21st century in poetry
