= Karissa Chen =

Taiwanese-American writer

- Born: May 27, 1982 (age 44)
- Education: Sarah Lawrence College (MFA)
- Occupation: Writer
- Writing career
- Genre: Fiction
- Website: www.karissachen.com

Karissa Chen (born May 27, 1982) is a Taiwanese American writer. Her debut novel, Homeseeking, was released in January 2025. She is a Fulbright, Kundiman Fiction, and VONA/Voices fellow.

== Biography ==
Chen received a Masters of Fine Arts in Fiction from Sarah Lawrence College in 2012.

She is a founding editor, alongside Ross Gay and Patrick Rosal, of the online sports magazine Some Call it Ballin'. She was the former senior fiction editor at The Rumpus and is the current editor-in-chief of Hyphen magazine.

Her first book, Homeseeking, was published by G. P. Putnam's Sons on January 7, 2025. A historical fiction novel, it is set between World War II to 2008, narrating the couple Haiwen and Suchi. The protagonists grew up in Shanghai and are separated due to the Chinese Civil War, finally reuniting in their seventies in Los Angeles. Chen began writing it in 2017 and finished editing in late 2023. The idea was inspired by a photograph of her late grandfather standing in front of his mother's grave, whom he hadn't seen since he left Shanghai for Taiwan near the end of the Chinese Civil War. Originally conceived as a short story, Chen wrote the first 100 pages in just four days. She stated its intention was to tell a story of immigration, and hope it "allows people to feel a little bit more empathy. If you are moved by these fictional people, then can you please also be moved by the very real people for whom this is happening on a daily basis." The novel was a Good Morning America Book Club pick and nominee for Favorite Historical Fiction and Favorite Debut Novel at the 2025 Goodreads Choice Awards. Kirkus Reviews praised how the author "avoids romanticizing or demonizing any of her characters. Nuances of class and ethnicity, as well as political identity, come to life as she digs into crevices of ambivalence and muddled motivation".

== Bibliography ==
=== Novels ===
- Homeseeking (2025)

=== Short fiction ===
- "Finding Beautiful" (2008; for Two Hawks Quarterly)
- "Fire Lover" (2010; for Pindeldyboz)
- "Little Birds" (2011; for Drinking with Papa Legba)
- "The Quiet After" (2011; for Kartika Review)
- "Long-Distance Lover" (2012; for Monkeybicycle)
- "The Emperor's Malady" (2012; for Necessary Ficiton)
- "Decency" (2013; from 13th Annual Writer's Digest Short Story Story Competition Collection)
- "A Brief Intimacy" (2013; from The Good Men Project)
- "The Testimony of Joyce B." (2013; for Eclectica Magazine)
- "Eclipse" (2013; for Corgi Snorkel Press)
- "X" (2014; for Outpouring: Typhoon Yolanda Relief Anthology)
- "Altar" (2014; for PANK)
- "What Remains" (2014; for Midnight Breakfast)
- "Return to Sender" (2015; for Wigleaf)
- "Dear Wigleaf" (2015; for Wigleaf)
- "Pomegranate" (2015; Guernica / PEN Flash Fiction Series)
- "Devils, Our Songs" (2016; for Gulf Coast)
- "Museum for Women Who Did Not Appear" (2017; for Catapult)
- "Blue Tears" (2018; from Go Home! AAWW Anthology)

== Literary awards ==
Year	Title	Award	Category	Result	Ref.
2025	Homeseeking	Goodreads Choice Award	Debut Novel	Nominated	
2025	Homeseeking	Goodreads Choice Award	Historical Fiction	Nominated	
