= Josh Berk =

American author

Josh Berk (born 1976) is an American author of books for children and teens. His first published Young Adult novel, The Dark Days of Hamburger Halpin (Random House, 2010) won a Parent's Choice Silver Medal and was named "a best book of 2010 for teens" by Amazon and Kirkus Reviews. His first mystery for young readers, Strike Three, You're Dead was nominated for an Edgar Award in 2014.

== Early life and education ==
Berk was born in Bethlehem, Pennsylvania. He grew up in Bethlehem, where both of his parents worked as librarians. He graduated from Drew University in Madison, New Jersey and also holds an MLIS from the University of Pittsburgh.

== Career ==
Berk began writing for newspapers and magazines, including The Morning Call in Allentown, Pennsylvania. He also published poetry in journals, including Black Bear Review and Thunder Sandwich.

His first young adult novel, The Dark Days of Hamburger Halpin, was published in 2010. It was described by School Library Journal as "[a] coming-of-age mash-up of satire, realistic fiction, mystery, and ill-fated teen romance." It has also received acclaim for starring a deaf protagonist and its skillful handling of related issues. His second young adult novel, Guy Langman: Crime Scene Procrastinator, received positive reviews from School Library Journal, Booklist, and Kirkus. In 2013, Strike Three, You're Dead launched a series of baseball-themed mysteries for younger readers called Lenny and the Mikes. Strike Three, You're Dead was an Edgar Award finalist and a selection for the New York Public Library's 2013 "Books for Reading and Sharing". The second book in the series, Say It Ain't So, was published in 2014.

He has worked in public libraries since 1998 and was appointed as executive director of the Bethlehem Area Public Library in 2014. He has served as a professor of English, writing, and young adult literature at several colleges and is an active member of the Society for American Baseball Research.

== Bibliography ==
=== Novels ===
- 2010 — The Dark Days of Hamburger Halpin, Random House, ISBN 0375856994
- 2012 — Guy Langman: Crime Scene Procrastinator, Random House, ISBN 037585701X
- 2013 — Strike Three, You're Dead, Random House, ISBN 978-0-375-87008-8
- 2014 — Say It Ain't So, Random House, ISBN 0375870091.
- 2020 — Camp Murderface, HarperCollins, co-authored with Saundra Mitchell
- 2021 — Camp Murderface 2: The Doom in the Deep, HarperCollins, co-authored with Saundra Mitchell

=== Short fiction ===
- "The Shift Sticks," Short story in Cornered, a bullying-themed anthology. Published by Running Press Kids, 2012. ISBN 07-62444282.
- "MC Wax," Short story in Starry Eyed: 16 Stories that Steal the Spotlight, a performing arts themed anthology. Published by Running Press Kids, 2013. ISBN 0762449497.

=== Other published works ===
- "Be a Jock or A Nerd." Essay contributed to Break These Rules: 35 YA Authors Write About Speaking Up, Standing Out, and Being Yourself. Chicago Review Press, 2013.

=== Periodicals ===
- Booklist, December 15, 2009, Cindy Dobrez, review of The Dark Days of Hamburger Halpin, p. 34.
- Bulletin of the Center for Children's Books, March, 2010, Karen Coats, review of The Dark Days of Hamburger Halpin, p. 277.
- Kirkus Reviews, December 15, 2009, review of The Dark Days of Hamburger Halpin.
- Publishers Weekly, January 18, 2010, review of The Dark Days of Hamburger Halpin, p. 49.
- School Library Journal, January, 2010, Jeffrey Hastings, review of The Dark Days of Hamburger Halpin, p. 96.
- Voice of Youth Advocates, June, 2010, Grace Zokovitch and Diane Colson, review of The Dark Days of Hamburger Halpin, p. 146.
- The Morning Call, April 4, 2012, Bethlehem author Josh Berk debuts new book for teens," by Kathy Lauer-Williams, Of The Morning Call.
