= Women Songwriters Hall of Fame =

Organization honoring women in the music industry

The Women Songwriters Hall of Fame (WSHOF) is a non-profit organization founded by entrepreneur and songwriter, Dr. Janice McLean DeLoatch. WSHOF honors women songwriters, composers, and writers worldwide that have made a significant impact in the music industry. The organization also offers resources such as scholarships, workshops, training, and opportunities to young songwriters and upcoming talent.

The WSHOF has an annual awards event held in Washington D.C. The inaugural show in 2021 was celebrated at the National Museum of Women in the Arts.

Lifetime Achievement and Legacy Honorees include Dee Dee Sharp and Cynthia Biggs in 2021. Dean Claudia Bornholdt, Alyze Elyse, and Freda Payne were awarded this achievement in 2023. Dr. Shakenna K. Williams was named Educator of the Year in 2024.

== Inductees and honorees ==
=== 2021 ===
- Tawatha Agee
- Mary Chapin Carpenter
- Jekalyn Carr
- Roberta Flack
- The Go-Go's
- Dr. Veryl Howard
- Bunny Hull
- Naomi Judd
- Klymaxx
- Dawnn Lewis
- Valerie Simpson
- Deniece Williams

=== 2022 ===
- Marilyn Bergman
- Doe
- Gloria Estefan
- Siedah Garrett
- Indigo Girls
- Loretta Lynn
- Rose Marie McCoy
- Jody Watley
- Junko Yagami

=== 2023 ===
- Toni Basil
- Angela Bofill
- Ann Hampton Callaway
- Jan Daley
- Olivia Newton-John
- Dorothy Norwood
- Scherrie Payne
- Jasmine Sandlas
- Pam Sawyer
- Cynthia Weil

=== 2024 ===
- Maria Callas
- LaLa Cope
- Martha Munizzi
- Soon Hee Newbold
- Angie Stone
- Crystal Waters
- Allee Willis

=== 2025 ===
- Asha Puthli
- Christina Shusho
- Janis Ian
- Julie Giroux
- Lari White
- Sylvia Moy

=== 2026 ===
Janie Bradford
