= Robert Hazel =

American poet and writer (1921–1993)

Robert Elvin Hazel (27 June 1921 – 19 July 1993) was an American poet and writer.

== Biography ==
Born to a physicist on June 27, 1921, in Bloomington, Indiana, Hazel served in the U.S. Marines during World War II. He transitioned from science to English during his undergraduate years, earning a B.A. from George Washington University and an M.A. from Johns Hopkins University where he studied with Karl Shapiro.

Hazel's writing drew influences from Walt Whitman, Hart Crane, and Charles Baudelaire. He authored five poetry collections, three novels, and several short stories. Among his works, the short story "White Anglo-Saxon Protestant" was published in The Hudson Review in Winter 1967.

Hazel also mentored a number of writers, including Wendell Berry, Bobbie Ann Mason, and Charles Simic.

== Awards and recognition ==
- Kentucky Writers Hall of Fame

== Bibliography ==
=== Novel ===
- The Lost Year (1953)
- A Field Full of People (1954)
- Early Spring (1971)
