= Indiana Authors Awards =

Indiana literary award

- Sponsored by: Glick Philanthropies
- Country: United States
- Presented by: Indiana Humanities
- First award: 2009
- Website: www.indianaauthorsawards.org

The Indiana Authors Awards, also known as the Eugene and Marilyn Glick Indiana Authors Awards, is a literary awards program that recognizes and honors authors from Indiana and literary works about Indiana. In 2020, awards were given in eight categories, including fiction, nonfiction, poetry, children's literature, young adult literature, drama, genre and emerging. The awards program runs biennially, with books published in 2020 and 2021 honored in 2022. Winners receive a cash prize, an Indiana limestone award trophy, and the opportunity to select an Indiana library to receive a donation. The 2024 winners include the following categories: nonfiction, fiction, debut, genre, poetry, young adult, middle grade, children's, and drama.

== History ==
The awards program was founded in 2009 by philanthropists Eugene and Marilyn Glick, partnering with The Indianapolis Public Library Foundation to create a program which recognized authors annually. Honors were awarded to authors in the three main categories of national, regional, and emerging, with some years including recognition for lifetime achievement and general excellence.

In 2018, Glick Philanthropies announced a desire to expand the awards program. After a year hiatus, in 2019 Glick Philanthropies partnered with Indiana Humanities to offer an expanded program, awarding honors to books every other year and a new Literary Champion Award. The 2020 awards included books in eight categories and recognized the Indiana Writers Center as Literary Champion. In the spring of 2022, the Indiana Authors Awards Tour brought recent award-winning authors to Indiana communities. The most recent awards cycle occurred in August 2024.

== Winners of awards for lifetime bodies of work ==
Following is a subset of the awards granted, focusing just on top honors that are for authors' complete lifetime works. These primarily are just the National Winners, the Regional Winners, and the Lifetime Achievement Awards which were all granted on basis of persons' entire body of works. It omits two National Finalist and four Regional Finalist awards given in 2009–10, the first years of the program, and not offered in any later year. (Note: Three of those six persons: Margaret McMullan, Scott Russell Sanders and James H. Madison later won National Winner, Regional Winner, or Lifetime Achievement awards and are included in the table presented.) It includes two "Excellence" awards given, and it omits "Emerging Winner" and "Emerging Finalist" awards. In 2019, no awards were granted, and the focus of the program shifted to make awards for recent books in various categories (therefore not for entire bodies of work). No awards were given in 2021. In 2020 and 2022, there appears to be only one "Lifetime Achievement" award granted, included below.

The remaining awards through 2024 make up a set of authors comparable to other writers' halls of fame. These awards, for entire bodies of authors' complete work, are:

Year	Award	Author
2009	National Winner	James Alexander Thom
2009	Regional Winner	Susan Neville
2010	National Winner	Scott Russell Sanders
2010	Regional Winner	Ray Boomhower
2011	National Winner	Margaret McMullan
2011	Regional Winner	Helen Frost
2012	Lifetime Achievement	Dan Wakefield
2012	National Winner	John Green
2012	Regional Winner	Barbara Shoup
2013	National Winner	Michael Martone
2013	Regional Winner	James H. Madison
2014	National Winner	Michael Shelden
2014	Regional Winner	Norbert Krapf
2015	Lifetime Achievement	Mari Evans
2015	National Winner	Marianne Boruch
2015	Regional Winner	Adrian Matejka
2016	National Winner	Karen Joy Fowler
2016	Regional Winner	Philip Gulley
2016	Genre Excellence Winner (children's picture books)	April Pulley Sayre
2017	National Winner	Kekla Magoon
2017	Regional Winner	Lori Rader-Day
2017	Genre Excellence Winner (middle-grade fiction)	John David Anderson
2018	National Winner	Kimberly Brubaker Bradley
2018	Regional Winner	Sandy Eisenberg Sasso
2018	Lifetime Achievement	James Alexander Thom
2020	Literary Champion	Indiana Writers Center
2022	Literary Champion	JL Kato
2022	Lifetime Achievement	James H. Madison
2024	Literary Champion	Tony Brewer
2024	Lifetime Achievement	Susan Neville
2026	Literary Champion	Women Writing for (a) Change Bloomington
2026	Lifetime Achievement	Marianne Boruch

== Category Winners ==
Year	Award	Author	Book
2020	Nonfiction	Ross Gay	The Book of Delights
2020	Fiction	Chris White	The Life List of Adrian Mandrick
2020	Emerging	Melissa Stephenson	Driven: A White-Knuckled Ride to Heartbreak and Back
2020	Genre	Maurice Broaddus	Pimp My Airship
2020	Poetry	Eugene Gloria	Sightseer in this Killing City
2020	Young Adult	Saundra Mitchell	All the Things We Do in the Dark
2020	Children's	Phillip Hoose	Attucks!: Oscar Robertson and the Basketball Team That Awakened a City
2020	Drama	James Still	The Jack Plays
2022	Nonfiction	Craig Fehrman	Author in Chief: The Untold Story of Our Presidents and the Books They Wrote
2022	Fiction	Susan Neville	The Town of Whispering Dolls
2022	Debut	Ashley C. Ford	Somebody's Daughter: A Memoir
2022	Genre	Paul Allor	Hollow Heart
2022	Poetry	Ross Gay	Be Holding
2022	Young Adult	Leah Johnson	You Should See Me in a Crown
2022	Middle Grade	Helen Frost	All He Knew
2022	Children's	Kim Howard	Grace and Box
2024	Nonfiction	Edward Fujawa	Vanished Indianapolis
2024	Fiction	Tess Gunty	The Rabbit Hutch
2024	Debut	Brittany Means	Hell If We Don’t Change Our Ways
2024	Genre	Rebecca McKanna	Don’t Forget the Girl
2024	Poetry	George Kalamaras	To Sleep in the Horse’s Belly: My Greek Poets and the Aegean Inside Me
2024	Young Adult	Kekla Magoon	The Minus-One Club
2024	Middle Grade	Maurice Broaddus	Unfadeable
2024	Children's	Janna Matthies	Here We Come!
2024	Drama	Jennifer Blackmer	Predictor
