= Soon Hee Newbold =

Korean American composer

- Occupations: composer, musician, film producer, director, author, screenwriter, actress
- Website: soonheenewbold.com

Soon Hee Newbold is an American composer, conductor, musician, film producer, and director.

== Early life ==
Newbold was born in South Korea and adopted as an infant. She spent her childhood growing up in Frederick, Maryland with two sisters. Newbold began studying piano at age five and Suzuki violin at age seven winning prestigious competitions and performing as a concert artist at an early age. As a soloist and in professional orchestras throughout the world, Newbold appeared in venues such as Carnegie Hall, The Kennedy Center, Wolf Trap, Disney World, Aspen Music Festival, Tanglewood, and numerous countries.

Newbold attended Frederick High School where her interests included science, languages, and drama. She studied German, French, and Russian and completed an internship in AIDS and cancer research at the National Institutes of Health in Fort Detrick, Maryland, under Dr. David Derse. Newbold received her Bachelor of Music degree from James Madison University where she concentrated on film scoring, orchestration, and audio production. During college, she also performed in professional symphonies in Virginia, Maryland, and New York and was the winner twice of the JMU School of Music Concerto Competition performing the Khachaturian Violin Concerto her Freshman year and Ravel's Tzigane as a Senior.

== Career ==
Upon graduation, Newbold worked in entertainment for Walt Disney World and performed in various symphonies in Florida. She also produced albums and wrote for recording projects and ensembles. As an actress, Newbold expanded her experiences to film and television. She got her first break in the film, The Waterboy, starring Adam Sandler, and first major role in the family comedy, Camp Tanglefoot with Gregg Russell, Drew Seeley, and Michael Andrew. Newbold is a highly sought after prolific and published composer. Her compositions can be heard around the world in film, orchestras, and other performing groups. She frequently travels the world as a guest composer, conductor, clinician, and keynote speaker. Her works have been performed at Carnegie Hall, Lincoln Center for the Performing Arts, The Kennedy Center, Walt Disney Concert Hall and the Midwest Clinic.

In 2014, Newbold was highlighted among prominent alumni in James Madison University's “Be The Change” campaign and for years had a featured poster in the lobby of the Forbes Center for the Performing Arts. In 2019, the Boston Music Project increased their number of orchestras, traditionally named for iconic and celebrated composers such as Mozart, Beethoven, and Boulanger, and chose Newbold as the name for their newest ensemble.

Notable commissions include works for Atlanta Symphony's The Merian Ensemble, Brevard Symphony Orchestra, and youth orchestras for the Columbus Symphony and LA Phil.

== Honors and awards ==
Newbold was inducted into the Women Songwriters Hall of Fame in 2024. The awards show was held in Washington D.C. at the National Museum of Women in the Arts.

In 2026, Newbold received the ASTA Orchestra Repertoire and Literature Award for significant contributions to the orchestral works in service of string music education.

== Personal life ==
Newbold currently lives in Southern California. She makes appearances worldwide as a guest composer and conductor but also works in film, television, and commercial projects as a producer and director. Newbold is also a proficient martial artist and trained in various weapons. She has a 3rd degree black belt in Tae Kwon Do, 2nd degree black belt in Hapkido, and a black belt in Kigumdo. Her mother was diagnosed with Huntington's disease, a terminal genetic neurological illness for which there is very little treatment and no cure. Newbold wrote the song Endless Dreams, and dedicated it to those affected by Huntington's to spread awareness and hope.

== Music ==
=== String orchestra ===
- Alis volat propiis (She flies with her own wings) (2024)
- American Landscape (2006)
- Angel City (2025)
- Appalachian Hymn (2005)
- Arabian Dreams (2003)
- Battle (2023)
- Blue-Fire Fiddler (2003)
- Calypso Sea (2019)
- Celtic Roots (2002)
- Celtic Sunrise (2020)
- Country Hoedown (2011)
- Dance of the Samodivi (2007)
- Desert Sands (2008)
- Dragon Dances (2003)
- Egyptian Legacy (2006)
- Elementa: I. Flights of Fancy, II. Terra, III. Fire and Ice (2022)
- Equuleus (2008)
- Fan Dance (2012)
- Fantasía Española (2005)
- Fire Dance (2007)
- Gaelic Castle (2009)
- Gravitas (2024)
- A Gypsy Tale (2005)
- The Haunted Carousel (2009)
- A Hero's Journey (2007)
- Hiawatha (2003)
- Honor and Glory (2008)
- Iditarod (2010)
- The Iliad: Fall of Troy (2025)
- Invicta: for Solo Violin and Orchestra (2021)
- Irish Faire (2011)
- Jubilee Fanfare (2016)
- A Knight's Quest (2005)
- Le froid de l'hiver (The Cold of the Winter) (2004)
- Legend of Dark Mountain (2007)
- Lion City (2009)
- Medieval Kings (2010)
- Mystic Caravan (2012)
- Mythos (2006)
- North Star to Freedom (2008)
- The Odyssey: Journey of Odysseus (2004)
- Orion and the Scorpion (2012)
- Perseus (2009)
- A Pirate's Legend (2004)
- Rhythm 'n' Blues (2006)
- Rhythms of Africa (2010)
- Riders in the Night (Life of a Cowboy) (2008)
- Rock Riffs (2011)
- Rockin' Jammin' Swingin' (2002)
- The Russian Music Box (2004)
- Ships of Ireland (2004)
- A Soldier's Hymn (2008)
- Song of the Sea Mariner (2006)
- Spirit of the American West (2003)
- Storm (2015)
- Viking (2014)
- Voyager (2020)
- Warrior Legacy (2010)
- The Wild Western Frontier (2007)

=== Full orchestra ===
- Aeternus Solaris (2027)
- Alpha and Omega (2020)
- Angel City (2025)
- American Landscape (2017)
- Egyptian Legacy orch. by Carl Rydlund (2014)
- Han'gŭl 한글 (2026)
- The Iliad: Fall of Troy (2025)
- Gravitas (2024)
- A Pirate's Legend orch. by Carl Rydlund (2014)
- Warrior Legacy (2013)

=== Concert band ===
- Gravitas (2025)
- Storm (2020)

=== Solo and ensemble ===
- Alis volat propiis (She flies with her own wings) for Quintet: harp, flute, oboe, viola, and bass clarinet (2024)
- Invicta: for solo violin or viola and piano (2021)

=== Arrangements ===
- Hallelujah Chorus from "Messiah" by G.F. Handel (2009)
- Herr Mannelig by Swedish Traditional (2023)
- Irish Legend by Robert Kerr (2008)
- Olaf and the Elf Maiden (Ólafur Liljurós) by Icelandic Traditional (2014)
- Salut d'Amour by Edward Elgar (2024)
- Slane (Be Thou My Vision) by Irish Traditional (2010)
- Sleepers Wake by J.S. Bach (2009)
- Thriller (as performed by Michael Jackson) by Rod Temperton (2023)

=== Film scores ===
- Forever Home: A Glimpse Into Dog Rescue (2014)
- Ghost Rock (2004)

=== Songs ===
- Endless Dreams (1999)
- Johnny, Come On Home (2004)
- Pinches of Salt, Prisms of Light (2000)
- True Friends (1992)

=== Method books and collections ===
- New Directions for Strings (The FJH Music Company, Inc.)

== Filmography ==
Produced features
Year	Title	Distribution
2003	Ghost Rock	Lions Gate Films
2005	Lethal	Silverline Entertainment
2005	Warrior or Assassin	Grizzly Peak Films and Phoenix Ventures
2005	The Nowhere Man	Grizzly Peak Films and Temple Entertainment
2007	The Salena Incident	Lions Gate Films, Temple Entertainment, and Newbold Pictures
2013	Hide and Seek	Newbold Pictures
2014	Forever Home: A glimpse into dog rescue	Newbold Pictures
2014	HOA Lady	Newbold Pictures
2019	I Am That Man	Hazel Blue Productions and Roaming Elephant Productions

Acting roles
Year	Title	Role	Notes
1998	The Waterboy	Mud Dog Cheerleader	
1999	Camp Tanglefoot: It All Adds Up	Rachel	
1999	Tú	Violinist	Music Video, a pop ballad by Colombian singer Shakira
2002	Essence of Echoes	Caller	
2005	Lethal	Technician	
2005	Killing Cupid	Venom	Also producer
2005	The Nowhere Man	Coroner, Dr. Wang	Also producer
2007	Alien Invasion Arizona	Cindi Lee	Also producer and screenwriter
2013	Bounty Killer	Vio Lin	
2014	Forever Home: A glimpse into dog rescue	Herself	Documentary Short
