= James H. Madison =

American historian and author

James H. Madison is an American writer who is an emeritus professor of history at the Indiana University.

== Career ==
Previously, he has served as a Fulbright professor at Hiroshima University and the University of Kent.

In 2020, The Ku Klux Klan in the Heartland was reviewed by The Herald-Times and others.

== Books ==
- The Indiana Way: A State History (1986)
- Eli Lilly, a Life, 1885–1977 (1989)
- The Ku Klux Klan in the Heartland (2001)
- Slinging Doughnuts for the Boys (2007)
- World War II: A History in Documents (2009)
- Hoosiers: A New History of Indiana (2014)

== Awards and recognition ==
- Sylvia E. Bowman Award (1994)
- Fulbright Award (1997)
- Bicentennial Medal (2020)
- Indiana Authors Award
