= Aimee Nezhukumatathil =

American poet

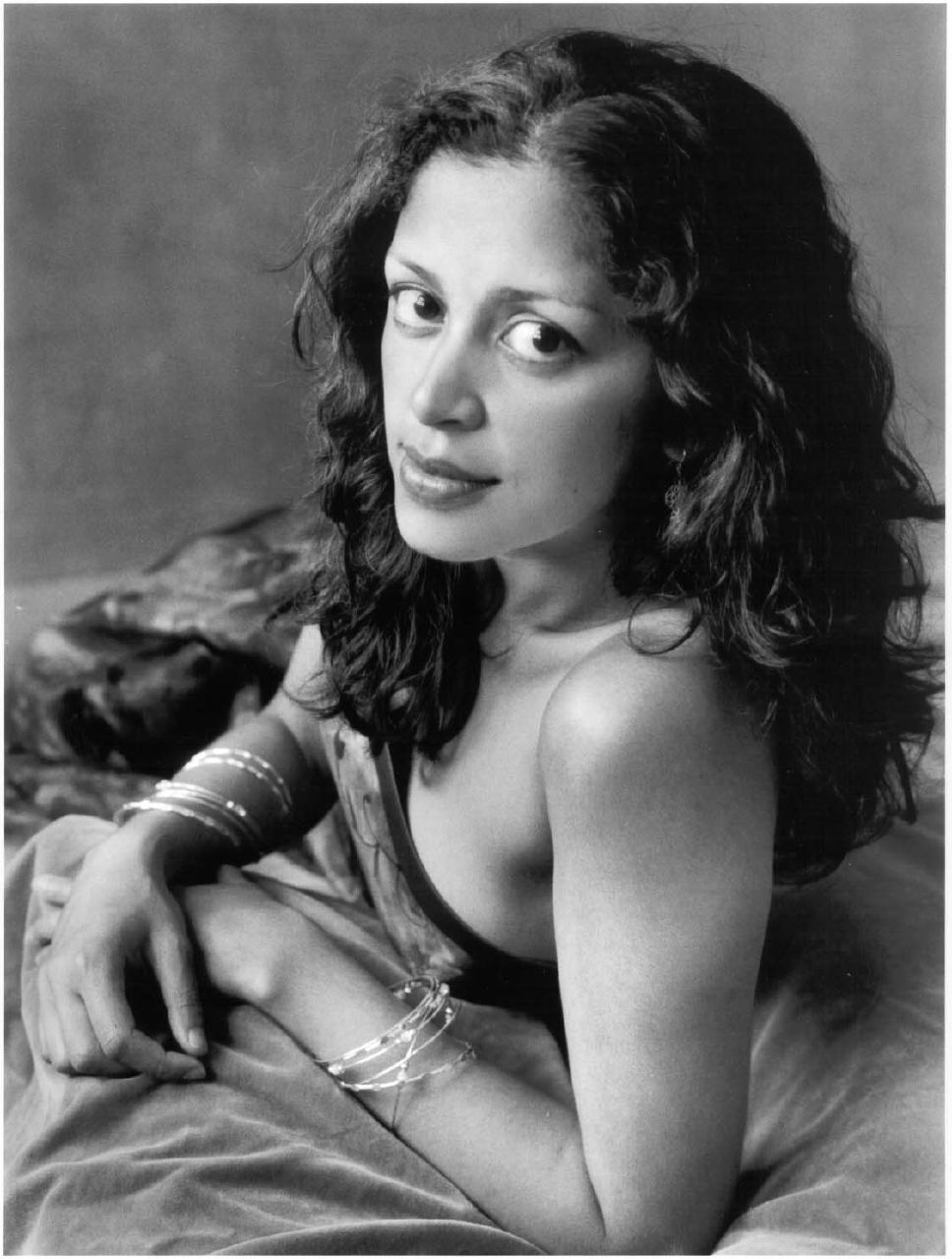
- Born: 1974 (age 51–52); Chicago, Illinois, U.S.
- Education: Ohio State University (BA, MFA)
- Occupations: Poet, author, professor

Aimee Nezhukumatathil (/ˈeɪmi nəˌzukuməˈtɒtɪl/; Malayalam: നേഴുകുമറ്റത്തിൽ; Malayalam: [n̪ēɻuɡumətːət̪ːil]; born in 1974 in Chicago, Illinois) is an American poet and essayist. She currently serves as poetry editor of Sierra Magazine and as professor of English in the University of Mississippi's MFA program, where she previously was the John and Renee Grisham Writer-in-Residence in 2016-17. She has also taught at the Kundiman Retreat for Asian American writers. Nezhukumatathil draws upon her Filipina and Malayali Indian background to give her perspective on love, loss, and the outdoors.

== Early life and education ==
Nezhukumatathil was born in Chicago, IL to a Filipina mother and a South Indian (Malayali) father. She moved with her family to Independence, Iowa, then Glendale, Arizona, then Larned, Kansas, then Gowanda, New York, and then finished high school at Beavercreek, OH, where she was Beavercreek High School's first female football mascot, Bucky Beaver. She graduated with a Bachelor of Arts in English under the Honors Program at The Ohio State University in 1996. Nezhukumatathil continued on at Ohio State, finishing in 2000 with a Master in Fine Arts (M.F.A) in English, with a specialty in both poetry and creative non-fiction. In 2009, she received the William Oxley Thompson Award for early career achievement and is given to alumni who have shown breakout success in their fields. In 2022, she won OSU's Alumni Medal, "the single highest honor bestowed by The Ohio State University Alumni... presented to alumni who have gained national or international distinction as outstanding representatives of their chosen fields or professions, bringing extraordinary credit to the university and significant benefit to humankind."

== Personal life ==
She lives in Oxford, Mississippi, with her husband, the writer Dustin Parsons, and their two sons.

== Work ==
=== Poetry ===
She is author of five poetry collections. Her first collection, Miracle Fruit, won the 2003 Tupelo Press Prize and the Global Filipino Literary Award in Poetry, was named the ForeWord Magazine Book of the Year in Poetry, and was a finalist for the Asian American Literary Award and the Glasgow Prize. Her second, At the Drive-In Volcano, won the 2007 Balcones Poetry Prize. With Ross Gay, in 2014 she co-authored the epistolary nature chapbook, Lace & Pyrite. Oceanic was published in 2018 by Copper Canyon Press and won the 2019 Mississippi Institute of Arts and Letters award for poetry. Night Owl was released in 2026 from Ecco.

=== Prose ===
Nezhukumatathil wrote two essay collections which were both named Indie Next Picks by independent booksellers of the American Booksellers Association. Her illustrated collection of food essays, Bite By Bite: Nourishments and Jamborees, was published in 2024 by Ecco. It was a finalist for the Ohioana Award in non-fiction. She is also the author of the New York Times bestselling book of nature essays World of Wonders: In Praise of Fireflies, Whale Sharks, and Other Astonishments, which was published in 2020 by Milkweed Editions and was a Barnes & Noble Book of the Year, as well as an NPR 2020 Best Book of the Year. Both essay collections were illustrated by Fumi Nakamura.

== Honors and awards ==
Among Nezhukumatathil's awards are a 2025 United States Artists Award, the 2024 Pepe Marcos-Iga Award for Innovation in Environmental Education from the North American Association for Environmental Education (NAAEE). The award honors her creative use of writing and storytelling to advance environmental education. Other awards include the 2020 Guggenheim Fellowship in poetry, a Mississippi Arts Commission Fellowship grant, inclusion in the Best American Poetry series, a 2009 National Endowment for the Arts Literature Fellowship in poetry, and a Pushcart Prize for the poem "Love in the Orangery". Her poems and essays have appeared in The New Yorker, Paris Review, The Yale Review, New Voices: Contemporary Poetry from the United States, The American Poetry Review, FIELD, Prairie Schooner, Poetry, New England Review, Converse: Contemporary English Poetry by Indians (edited by Sudeep Sen, and published by Pippa Rann Books, London), and Tin House. Nezhukumatathil served as poetry editor for Orion magazine from 2015-2020.

== Books ==
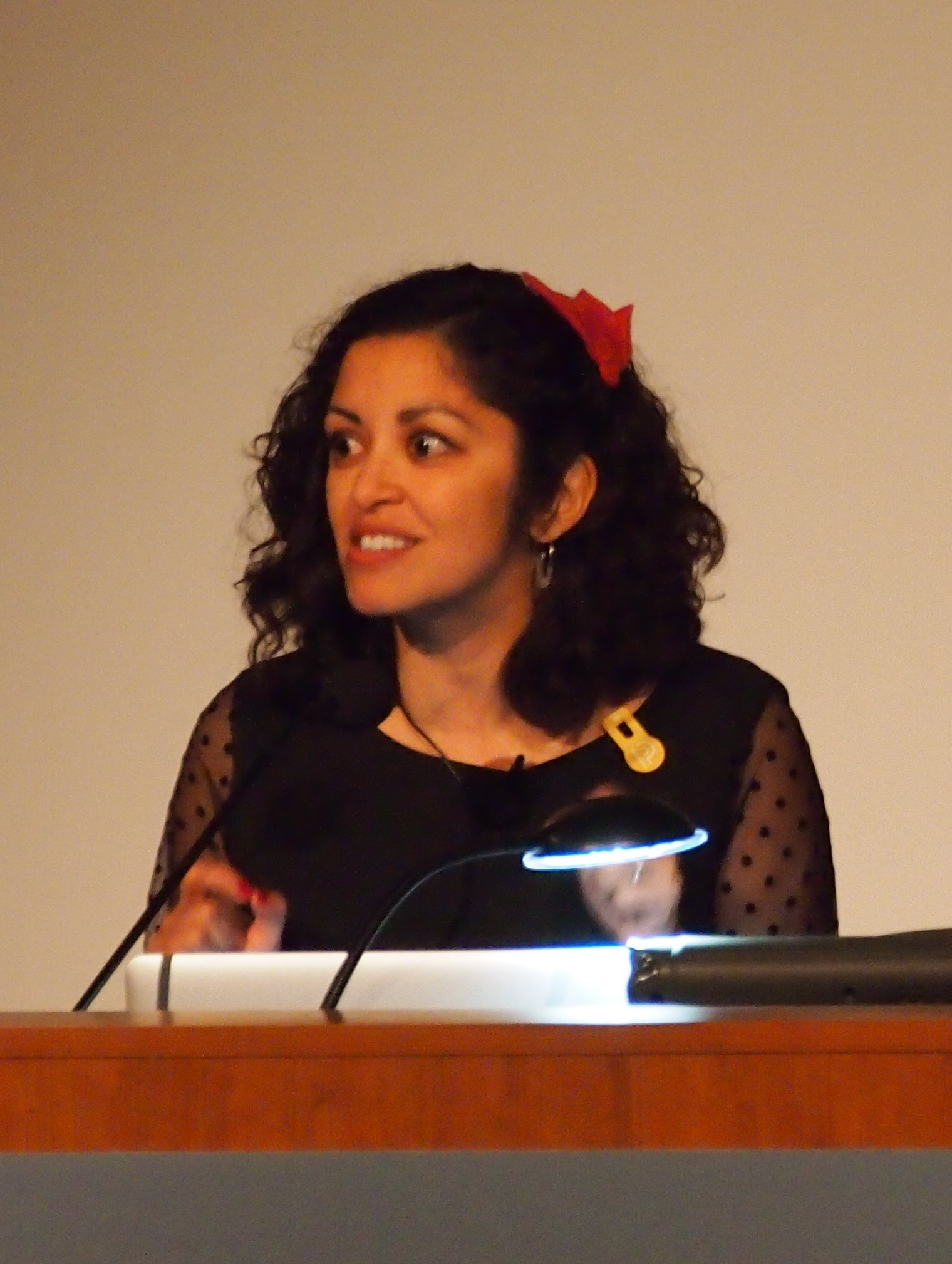
Nezhukumatathil reading at Philips Collection

- Fishbone, Snail's Pace Press, 2000 (chapbook)
- One Bite, Ohio State University, 2000 (MFA thesis)
- Miracle Fruit: poems, Tupelo Press, 2003, ISBN 9780971031081
- At the Drive-in Volcano: poems, Tupelo Press, 2007, ISBN 9781932195453
- Lucky Fish, Tupelo Press, 2011, ISBN 9781932195583
- Oceanic, Copper Canyon Press, 2018 ISBN 9781556595264
- World of Wonders: In Praise of Fireflies, Whale Sharks, and Other Astonishments, Milkweed Editions, 2020, ISBN 1571313656
- Lace & Pyrite, (with Ross Gay) Get Fresh Books [reprinted], 2022 ISBN 9780982710678
- Bite by Bite: Nourishments & Jamborees, Ecco Press, 2024, ISBN 9780063282261
- Night Owl, Ecco Press, 2026

Anthologies

- Melissa Tuckey, ed. (2018). Ghost Fishing: An Eco-Justice Poetry Anthology. University of Georgia Press. ISBN 978-0820353159.
- Barbara Hamby; David Kirby, eds. (2010). "What I learned from the Incredible Hulk". Seriously Funny: Poems About Love, Death, Religion, Art, Politics, Sex, and Everything Else. University of Georgia Press. p. 19. ISBN 9780820330877.
- Rachel Zucker; Arielle Greenberg, eds. (2010). "Overwinter". Starting Today: 100 Poems for Obama's First 100 Days. University of Iowa Press. p. 5. ISBN 9781587298714. "Aimee Nezhukumatathil."
- John McNally, ed. (2007). "A History of Hair". When I Was a Loser: True Stories of (Barely) Surviving High School. Simon and Schuster. pp. 96–108. ISBN 9781416539377.
