= The Vespertine =

2011 novel by Saundra Mitchell

- The Vespertine Cover
- Author: Saundra Mitchell
- Language: English
- Series: Vespertine
- Genre: Historical fiction, Romance, Young adult
- Publisher: Harcourt Children’s Books
- Publication date: 7 March 2011
- Publication place: United States
- Media type: Print (Hardcover)
- Pages: 304
- ISBN: 978-0-547-48247-7
- Followed by: The Springsweet

The Vespertine is a young adult historical fiction romance novel by Saundra Mitchell. It follows the romantic journey of Amelia van den Broek while she develops her startling new ability to see into the future.

== Plot ==
In the summer of 1889, Amelia van den Broek is sent by her brother to the city of Baltimore, much grander and different from her fishing village, to find a suitable match for marriage. Along with her cousin Zora, Amelia does all the normal things a young woman would do in the city—call on other ladies, have them to tea, gossip about the latest dance and all the fine gentlemen there. But once there, her eye catches a certain slant of light in the setting sun and she sees a glimpse of the future.

She shares this talent with her cousin Zora, and soon the two girls are calling on and being called upon by the richest young ladies in the city, who each want to know their own fortune, seen through Amelia’s eyes. Amelia also has many run-ins with the mysterious and romantic Nathaniel, who is not a suitable match for her, but whom she feels drawn to nevertheless. They continue to see one another in secret and she soon learns that he has a talent of his own—he can travel with the wind.

Zora also falls in love, and when Amelia has a vision relating to Nathaniel's death, she eventually confesses it to her cousin, who waves off her fear. But when her vision comes to pass and he is killed, Amelia is shipped back home, believing that Nathaniel will come for her and take her away despite hearing word of his death.

Interspersed throughout the novel are chapters of Amelia’s life after this summer, where she has been sent back to her brother and locked away, thought to be mad. Her brother’s wife is kind to her, but both find her difficult. She continues to call out for Nathaniel, who must be dead, because he will not come to her. Her brother’s wife eventually readies Amelia to leave due to her disruptions to their household, though not in a thoroughly unkind manner. Amelia steps out the door, ready to face the world on her own, only to find Nathaniel waiting for her, having been unable to get there sooner because his ability is hindered by water, and she had put the ocean between them. Together, the pair set off to a new life.

== Reception ==
Rhona Campbell of the School Library Journal said of it: “The protagonist is a bit of a wet dishrag, the dramatic tragedy that Mitchell's prose so direly portends is disappointingly tame, and the titillation doesn't go beyond searing smooches. But the pervasively descriptive and evocative language combines with period vocabulary and detail to create a mood piece one would never want to deny romance-pining schoolgirls…” Booklist said: "Equal parts vivid period detail, gothic melodrama, and foreboding premonitions coming true . . . an absorbing tale of a headstrong and passionate (but not anachronistically so) woman seeking her future.". The Kirkus Review says: “Mitchell depicts Victorian middle-class society with real flair. Her descriptions of the girls ring vibrantly true.”.
