= Sena Jeter Naslund =

American writer (born 1942)

- Born: June 28, 1942 (age 84); Birmingham, Alabama, U.S.
- Education: Birmingham–Southern College (BA); Iowa Writers' Workshop (MA, PhD)
- Occupation: Writer
- Parent(s): Marvin Luther Jeter; Flora Lee (Sims) Jeter

Sena Jeter Naslund (born June 28, 1942) is an American writer. She has published seven novels and two collections of short fiction. Her 1999 novel, Ahab's Wife, and her 2003 novel, Four Spirits, were each named a New York Times Notable Book of the Year. She is the Writer in Residence at University of Louisville and was the program director for the MFA in Writing at Spalding University in the same city. In 2005, Governor Ernie Fletcher named Naslund Poet Laureate of Kentucky.

== Biography ==
Sena Kathryn Jeter was born in Birmingham, Alabama in 1942 to Marvin Luther Jeter, a physician, who died when she was 15, and Flora Lee (Sims) Jeter, a music teacher.

In 1964 she earned a bachelor's degree from Birmingham–Southern College. She completed her Master of Arts and PhD at the Iowa Writer's Workshop at the University of Iowa.

Sena Jeter Naslund and Karen Mann founded the Sena Jeter Naslund-Karen Mann Graduate School of Writing at Spalding University in Louisville, Kentucky. Naslund-Mann is a low-residency MFA program founded in the fall of 2001.

Thematically, much of Naslund's work explores women who are "marginalized or misunderstood". In the bestselling Ahab's Wife, for instance, Stacey D'Erasmo suggests

"Naslund has taken less than a paragraph's worth of references to the captain's young wife from Herman Melville's Moby-Dick and fashioned from this slender rib not only a woman but an entire world. That world is a looking-glass version of Melville's fictional seafaring one, ruled by compassion as the other is by obsession, with a heroine who is as much a believer in social justice as the famous hero is in vengeance."

She lives in Louisville, Kentucky, at St. James Court, in the former home of Kentucky poet Madison Cawein.

== Works ==
=== Short stories and novellas ===
- Ice Skating at the North Pole: Stories (1989)
- The Disobedience of Water: Stories and Novellas (1999)

=== Novels ===
- Sherlock In Love (1993)
- The Animal Way to Love (1993)
- Ahab's Wife: or, The Star-Gazer (1999)
- Four Spirits (2003)
- Abundance: A Novel of Marie Antoinette (2006)
- Adam & Eve (2010)
- The Fountain of St. James Court; or, Portrait of the Artist as an Old Woman (2013)
