= Jimmy Madison =

Jimmy Madison may refer to:

- Jimmy Madison (musician) (born 1947), American jazz musician
- James Madison (1751–1836), fourth president of the United States
