= Viktor Näslund =

Swedish ice hockey player

Viktor Naslund
- Born: July 1, 1992 (age 33) Jönköping, Sweden
- Height: 6 ft 1 in (185 cm)
- Weight: 198 lb (90 kg; 14 st 2 lb)
- Position: Defence
- Shoots: Left
- Elitserien team: HV71
- NHL draft: Undrafted
- Playing career: 2011–present

Viktor Naslund (born July 1, 1992) is a Swedish professional ice hockey player who currently plays for HV71 in the Swedish Elitserien.

== Career statistics ==
| | | | Regular season | | | | | Playoffs |
| Season | Team | League | GP | G | A | Pts | PIM | GP | G | A | Pts | PIM |
|---|---|---|---|---|---|---|---|---|---|---|---|---|
| 2006–07 | HV71 U16 | U16 SM | 5 | 1 | 2 | 3 | 14 | — | — | — | — | — |
| 2007–08 | HV71 J18 | J18 Elit | 5 | 0 | 0 | 0 | 0 | — | — | — | — | — |
| 2007–08 | HV71 J18 | J18 Allsvenskan | 11 | 1 | 2 | 3 | 4 | — | — | — | — | — |
| 2008–09 | HV71 J18 | J18 Elit | 16 | 0 | 4 | 4 | 47 | — | — | — | — | — |
| 2008–09 | HV71 J8 | J18 Allsvenskan | 13 | 0 | 0 | 0 | 18 | — | — | — | — | — |
| 2008–09 | HV71 J20 | J20 SuperElit | 1 | 0 | 1 | 1 | 0 | — | — | — | — | — |
| 2009–10 | HV71 J18 | J18 Elit | 2 | 2 | 2 | 4 | 2 | — | — | — | — | — |
| 2009–10 | HV71 J18 | J18 Allsvenskan | 1 | 0 | 0 | 0 | 0 | — | — | — | — | — |
| 2009–10 | HV71 J20 | J20 SuperElit | 36 | 2 | 5 | 7 | 20 | 3 | 0 | 0 | 0 | 0 |
| 2010–11 | HV71 J20 | J20 SuperElit | 41 | 1 | 11 | 12 | 34 | 5 | 0 | 1 | 1 | 0 |
| 2011–12 | HV71 J20 | J20 SuperElit | 48 | 8 | 14 | 22 | 32 | 6 | 1 | 1 | 2 | 2 |
| 2011–12 | HV71 | Elitserien | 1 | 0 | 0 | 0 | 0 | — | — | — | — | — |
| 2012–13 | Mörrums GoIS IK | Hockeyettan | 44 | 4 | 2 | 6 | 28 | — | — | — | — | — |
| 2013–14 | Mörrums GoIS IK | Hockeyettan | 43 | 1 | 7 | 8 | 14 | — | — | — | — | — |
| 2014–15 | HC Dalen | Hockeyettan | 36 | 6 | 14 | 20 | 14 | — | — | — | — | — |
| 2015–16 | HC Dalen | Hockeyettan | 36 | 2 | 8 | 10 | 20 | — | — | — | — | — |
| 2016–17 | HC Dalen | Hockeyettan | 34 | 3 | 7 | 10 | 6 | — | — | — | — | — |
| 2017–18 | HC Dalen | Hockeyettan | 39 | 2 | 3 | 5 | 8 | 3 | 0 | 1 | 1 | 2 |
| 2018–19 | HC Dalen | Hockeyettan | 40 | 2 | 7 | 9 | 34 | — | — | — | — | — |
| 2019–20 | HC Dalen | Hockeyettan | 36 | 2 | 9 | 11 | 44 | — | — | — | — | — |
| 2019–20 | Karlskrona HK | HockeyAllsvenskan | 6 | 0 | 0 | 0 | 0 | — | — | — | — | — |
| 2019–20 | Västerviks IK | HockeyAllsvenskan | 7 | 0 | 0 | 0 | 2 | 1 | 0 | 0 | 0 | 0 |
| 2020–21 | Ringerike Panthers | Norway2 | 25 | 2 | 10 | 12 | 24 | — | — | — | — | — |
| 2021–22 | Ringerike Panthers | Norway | 44 | 2 | 7 | 9 | 12 | 4 | 0 | 0 | 0 | 2 |
| 2022–23 | Bodens IK | Hockeyettan | 32 | 1 | 3 | 4 | 14 | 8 | 0 | 1 | 1 | 0 |
| 2023–24 | HC Fassa Falcons | AlpsHL | 38 | 6 | 21 | 27 | 18 | — | — | — | — | — |
| Elitserien totals | | | 1 | 0 | 0 | 0 | 0 | — | — | — | — | — |
| Norway totals | | | 44 | 2 | 7 | 9 | 12 | 4 | 0 | 0 | 0 | 2 |
| HockeyAllsvenskan totals | | | 13 | 0 | 0 | 0 | 2 | 1 | 0 | 0 | 0 | 0 |
| Hockeyettan totals | | | 340 | 23 | 60 | 83 | 182 | 11 | 0 | 2 | 2 | 2 |
