= Junko Yagami =

Japanese singer-songwriter (born 1958)

- 八神 純子
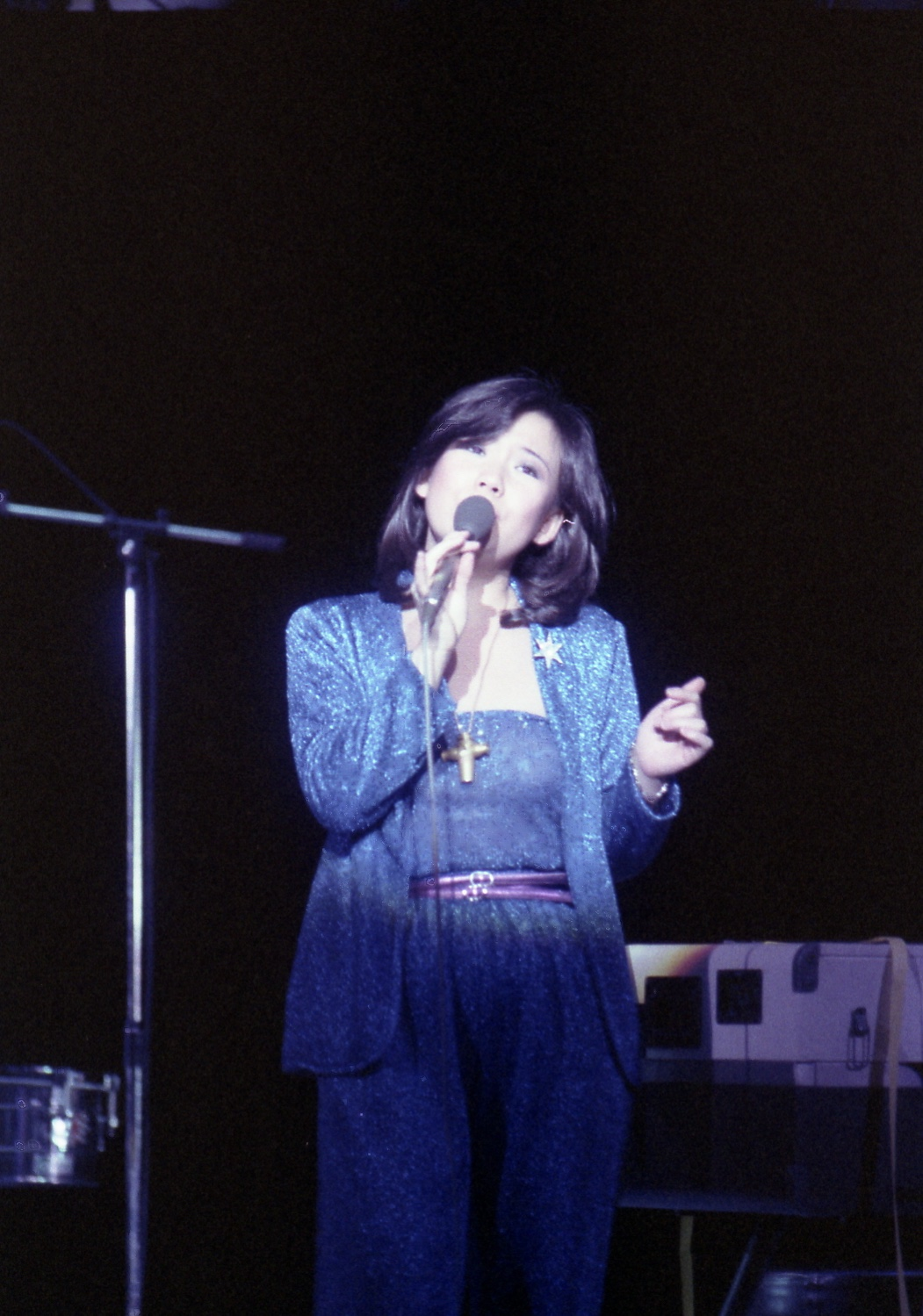
- Junko Yagami in the 1970s
- Born: Yagami Junko; 5 January 1958 (age 68); Nagoya, Aichi Prefecture, Japan
- Occupations: Singer, singer-songwriter
- Spouse: J.J. Stanley (m. 1986)
- Musical career
- Genres: New wave; City pop; Kayōkyoku
- Years active: 1974–2001; 2010-present
- Website: junkoyagami.com

Junko Yagami (八神 純子, Yagami Junko; born 5 January 1958), is a Japanese singer and songwriter from Aichi Prefecture. She has released 25 albums, including six live concert albums, and is a notable figure in Japanese music of the 1970s and 1980s. Since her marriage in 1986, she has also recorded under the name "June Stanley".

== Biography ==
=== Early life ===
Junko Yagami was born in Aichi prefecture. Born on January 5, 1958, in Chikusa-ku, Nagoya, as the eldest daughter of Ryozo Yagami, who was born in the founding family of Yagami Seisakusho and later became the company's fourth chairman.

She started learning the piano at the age of three and Japanese dance from the first grade of elementary school. She has loved singing since she was a child, and even at home she continued to sing the songs of The Peanuts and Shirley Bassey, which surprised her parents.

On the other hand, Yagami said about her childhood, "When I was in elementary school, I was very clumsy and awkward, and I didn't like myself. The child who was good at exercising was touted and prominent, but I was shy and totally unobtrusive."

When she entered Aichi Shukutoku High School, she formed a folk guitar circle and sometimes went to school festivals at other schools with them. She started attending Yamaha's vocal talent school and was devoted to singing practice. She started writing songs while she was in high school, and when she was 16 years old in 1974, she wrote and composed the song "Everyone on a Rainy Day" for the first time.

=== Pre-debut ===
Yagami participated in the eighth Yamaha Popular Song Contest (Popcon) held on October 13, 1974, and won the Outstanding Song Award for "Everyone on a Rainy Day". At the same tournament, "Time of Happiness" was also nominated and selected as a prize-winning song. Yagami was the only one who was nominated for two songs in the same tournament and won a prize at the same time after the final round was held at Tsumagoi. After that, she participated in the 5th World Popular Song Festival with "Junko's Dream" and advanced to the finals.

Regarding music activities while attending Aichi Shukutoku High School, Yagami said, "Because it was a school that did not allow flashy things, I was called to the staff room every time I entered a contest and was warned to refrain from doing so."

On December 10, 1974, she made her pre-debut on the AARD-VARK label of Canyon Records with the single "Rainy Day Hitotsugoto". The following year, on 10 February 1975, the second single "Happy Time" was also released.

She also participated in the 9th Popcon held in May 1975 and won the Excellent Song Award for "To the Land of Happiness". She also participated in the 6th World Popular Song Festival with "Hand in Hand" and won for the second consecutive year. Yagami says she was invited by a foreign artist who participated in the World Popular Song Festival and decided to take on the challenge of overseas music festivals and contests. In 1976, when she was in her third year of high school, she participated in the 17th Chilean Music Festival (Festival de Viña, the largest music festival in South America held in Vina del Mar, Chile), singing "I Shall Forget" in Japanese clothes with the orchestra in the background and she won 6th place.

After graduating from high school, she went on to the path of music, and from 1976 before her professional debut to 1980 after her debut, she appeared with Takashi Kawamura on the band program "Dede and Junko's Music Trip" provided by Reiyukai on Nippon Cultural Broadcasting.

"Small Sakuragai" produced at the time of debut was a slow tempo folk song-like song, but it was not announced at that time. "Popcon Super Selection Junko Yagami Best" was released on 26 March 2003, as one of the best album "Popcon Super Selection" series released by King Records to commemorate the 30th anniversary of Popcon.

=== Full-scale debut ===
On January 5, 1978, on her 20th birthday, she made her full-scale debut as a professional singer with the single "Memories are too beautiful" from Discomate Records. This song was the 25th highest on the Oricon chart and was a hit with sales of 120,000 copies. On June 25 of the same year, the debut album "Memories are too beautiful" was released and became a hit at the 5th place on the Oricon chart.

Also, from the beginning of her debut, it was epoch-making at that time that she led the exclusive backing band "Melting Pot" composed of selected members from Nem Conservatory.

Then, on May 5 of the same year, the single "Goodbye Words" was released. This song was a cover of the song by Kayoko Ono, who won the 13th Popcon Grand Prix held in 1977. The album "Memories Are Too Beautiful" also covers Ono's song "It's Capricious." However, it was unpleasant for Yagami that the single became a cover instead of her own composition. Reflecting on this situation, the sales result was only 67th on the Oricon chart and sales of 19,000 copies, despite the hit of the previous work.

=== "Mizuiro no Ame" ===
Due to sluggish sales of the single "Goodbye Words", Yagami was forced to consider retiring as a singer. When she was at a loss to make the next song, she suddenly got an idea at the pedestrian bridge in Harajuku, Tokyo, and composed "Mizuiro no Ame" (lyrics by Yoshiko Miura). Yagami said, "'Mizuiro no Ame' was written with the voice of Hiromi Iwasaki in mind, and the previous single didn't sell as expected, so I was thinking of retiring as a singer and becoming a writer." However, she said, "I tried to sing it myself and it was very well received and recorded."

When "Mizuiro no Ame" was released as a single on September 5, the same year, the number of requests began to increase mainly for cable broadcasting and radio programs, and the ranking of the Oricon chart also rose, and it started broadcasting on TBS in January 1978. By appearing in the "Spotlight of the Week" corner, which introduces the hot songs of the music program "The Best Ten," she gained popularity throughout the country. Yagami said, "I made a big break overnight."

Along with that, the number of appearances on TV music programs increased, and Hiroshi Kume, who was the moderator of "The Best Ten", often made fun of her about her body shape, appearance, and costumes every time Yagami appeared. However, Yagami positively accepts that "I think he has eased my tension all the time." Regarding Tetsuko Kuroyanagi, "I was really a student and a hard worker, and I took off my hat every time I worked. The pre-production research was great," she said.

The single "Mizuiro no Ame" was the second highest on the Oricon chart and became a big hit with sales of 600,000 copies. In December of the same year, she won the "Lion Listeners Grand Prix FM Tokyo Best Newcomer Award" for this song.

On October 1, 1978, Junko Yagami's official fan club was formed and the newsletter "Hello Ando Gubbai" was published.

The following year, on April 5, 1979, she released her second album, "I'm a Real Face," and won the 1st place on the Oricon chart. In the same year, she made a series of single hits such as "Memory Screen" and "Polar Star".

Characterized by the style of playing the samba whistle while playing the piano, she always hung the cross-shaped samba whistle from her neck like a trademark. Participation in the Chilean music festival had a great influence, and many of the early hits were minor chord songs with bossa nova and samba rhythms and Latin melancholy and passion. Yagami herself said, "It used to be dark. But I still think that the minor passion is beautiful."

=== After staying in the United States ===
Yagami traveled to Los Angeles, USA for 54 days from April 1980, and stayed with an ordinary family. After returning to Japan, the single "Purple Town ~ You Oughta Know By Now ~" released on July 21 of the same year became the second highest on the Oricon chart and became a big hit with sales of 600,000 copies. This song is a powerful song of the streets of New York based on the experience of staying in the United States, and was used as a CM image song for JALPAK's "I LOVE NEW YORK" Campaign.

The first half of this song was composed based on the arrangement and part of the melody line of Ray Kennedy's "You Oughta Know By Now", and the second half of the chorus part was Yagami's original composition. However, it was initially released as "Purple Town", and since Kennedy's name was not credited to the first press board, there was a fuss about "plagiarism" immediately after the release. On the other hand, the publisher, Disco Mate Records, got permission to use the music from Kennedy, and the rights of the original song were complicated, and the CM sound source was suddenly made into a record, which caused a mistake. From the re-press board, the original title "You Oughta Know By Now" was also written in the title, and Kennedy and three others were additionally credited to solve the problem. The suspicions were cleared, and Yagami made her first appearance in the "31st NHK Kouhaku Uta Gassen" of the same year with this song.

In addition, the single "Mr. Blue ~ My Earth ~" on November 5 of the same year was used as the theme song for NHK's comprehensive "Panorama Solar System".

Steadily tie-up songs with companies such as Yamaha Audio ("I'm A Woman") in 1981 and JAL Okinawa Campaign '82 ("Summer in Summer-Memory is Burned on Bare Skin") in 1982 were also big hits.

Around this time, Yagami was mentioned in a women's weekly magazine about her relationship with Hiromi Go, but according to Yagami, he was only a friend who went to movies and meals, not a lover.

As an additional trial, "Love Supreme" was used for the theme from the anime film "Final Yamato" in 1983.

In 1983, with Brooks Arthur as the producer, she produced and released the all-English album "I WANNA MAKE A HIT WIT-CHOO" in the United States. However, she was not satisfied with the workmanship and felt her limits in expressing herself in English, but one day she dreamed of moving overseas to be able to enjoy music and movies in English. Due to such a change of mind, she left the Yamaha Music Foundation, which she had belonged to since her debut, at the end of the album "FULL MOON" released on 5 December of the same year.

=== Marriage / immigration to the United States ===
At the same time as the transfer from Yamaha, the record company also transferred from Discomate Records to Alfa Moon. From 1985 to 1986, Alfa Moon released three albums, "COMMUNICATION", "Jun" and "Yagamania".

On February 7, 1986, Yagami married John Stanley, a British music producer two years older than her, in Hawaii. She moved to the United States in the fall and lives at Wood Ranch in Simi Valley, California. She gave birth to her eldest daughter in 1989 and her eldest son in 1993.

After getting married, she moved her base of activities to Los Angeles, and her music activities in Japan came to Japan at every concert. Since 1990, she has returned to Japan every year to hold concerts and dinner shows.

However, the terrorist attacks on the United States occurred on 11 September 2001. Yagami was shocked and scared to fly. In addition, one week before the terrorist attack, three friends' families were shot dead by an acquaintance at home in California, where she lived at that time, and she was unable to leave her children from fear and cancelled the concert schedule. After the terrorist attack, it became difficult to plan a concert by going back and forth between Japan and the United States in the unstable social situation in the United States. Therefore, at the end of the Christmas concert in 2001, the annual concert in Japan was suspended.

Since then, the release of singles and albums ceased in the 2000s, and the activity has been almost suspended. However, in Japan, the best album continued to sell during that time, and in 2002, "Junko Yagami CD-BOX" and in 2009, "Junko Yagami 1974-1986 SINGLES plus" and CD-BOX were released twice.

In 2010, she appeared on "Memories of Memories" broadcast on August 21 and "SONGS" (both NHK General TV) broadcast at a later date, and sang on a Japanese TV program for the first time in a while. There was a growing demand from fans for a return. Yagami later said that she had thought "I've done it all" until then, but the appearance of the program and its response gave birth to the desire to sing in Japan again.

In 2022, Yagami was inducted into the Women Songwriters Hall of Fame.

== Discography ==
=== Studio albums ===
| Year | Album name | Label | Notes |
|---|---|---|---|
| 1978 | 思い出は美しすぎて | Discomate | |
| 1979 | 素顔の私 | Discomate | |
| 1980 | Mr. メトロポリス | Discomate | |
| 1982 | 夢見る頃を過ぎても | Discomate | |
| 1983 | Lonely Girl | Discomate | |
| 1983 | I Wanna Make a Hit Wit-Choo | Discomate | |
| 1983 | Full Moon | Discomate | |
| 1985 | Communication | Moon Records | |
| 1985 | 純 | Moon Records | |
| 1986 | Yagamania | Moon Records | |
| 1987 | Truth Hurts | NEC Avenue | |
| 1989 | Love is Gold | NEC Avenue | |
| 1990 | My Invitation | NEC Avenue | |
| 1991 | State of Amber | NEC Avenue | |
| 1993 | Mellow Cafe | NEC Avenue | |
| 1994 | Renaissance | NEC Avenue | |
| 1997 | So Amazing | Id Net Inc. | As June Stanley |
| 2013 | Here I Am 〜Head to Toe〜 | GT Music | |
| 2016 | There You Are | Listen J Label | |

=== Live albums ===
| Year | Album name | Label | Notes |
|---|---|---|---|
| 1984 | Junko The Live | Discomate | |
| 2014 | The Night Flight | GT Music | With Tsugutoshi Goto, Masaki Matsubara, Jun Sato & Syuichi Murakami |
| 2016 | The Night Flight 2 | Listen J Label | |
| 2017 | Premium Symphonic Concert | Listen J Label | |
| 2017 | The Night Flight 3 | Listen J Label | |
| 2018 | This Is The ヤガ祭り | GT Music | |

=== Cover albums ===
| Year | Album name | Label | Notes |
|---|---|---|---|
| 1992 | Christmas at Junko's | Bandai Music | |
| 1996 | Inside Myself | Id Net Inc. | As June Stanley |
| 2012 | Vreath 〜My Favorite Cocky Pop〜 | GT Music | |

=== Soundtracks ===
| Year | Album name | Label | Notes |
|---|---|---|---|
| 1983 | Yamato Final - Synthesizer Fantasy | Columbia | With Jun Fukamachi, Hiroshi Miyagawa and Kentarō Haneda |

=== Compilations ===
| Year | Album name | Label |
|---|---|---|
| 1980 | Junko the Best | Discomate |
| 1982 | Summer In Summer | Discomate |
| 1984 | 軌跡I | Discomate |
| 1984 | 軌跡II | Discomate |
| 1984 | Best 15 | Discomate |
| 1987 | Chapter II Best Selection | Moon Records |
| 1990 | ベスト・オブ・ミー | NEC Avenue |
| 1996 | The Best Selection | Continental |
| 2006 | ポプコン・マイ・リコメンド 八神純子 ポップヒッツ | King Records |
| 2009 | 1974~1986 Singles Plus | Victor |
| 2013 | 2CD Best 1978-1983 | Yamaha Music Communications |
