= Alyze Elyse =

American singer

- Born: North Carolina
- Origin: North Carolina
- Genres: R&B, Hip hop
- Label: Soul City Entertainment

Alyze Elyse is an American filmmaker, actress, screenwriter, and singer.

== Career ==
Alyze Elyse is the co-owner of Soul City Films and owner and Executive Producer of Alyze Elyse Productions, an independent production company. She is also noted as one of the first African American independent female filmmakers known to garner over 100 million minutes streamed on Amazon Prime.

Alyze Elyse was awarded a Lifetime and Achievement Award and inducted into the Women Songwriter's Hall of Fame.

Elyse has experimented with various musical genres, including R&B, blues, and southern soul.

=== Filmography ===
Alyze Elyse has written, executive produced, co-directed and starred in a few of her projects:

- Innocent (2008)
- I'm That Kind of Woman (2012)
- Behind Closed Doors (2013)
- 24 Hours (2014)
- House Arrest (2016)
- Flowers (2016)
- Zoo Escape (2018)
- David (2018)
- Going 4 Broke (2020)
- Blame (2021)
- Blame: The Beginning (2022)
- Neus (2023)
- EVEN (2024)

=== Music ===
- What I Did for Love (2003)
- Soul City Presents Alyze Elyse (2005)
- Innocent (2007)
- U Got Me Trapped
- Moan
- David soundtrack
- Neus soundtrack

She has singles ranked on Billboard and other charts.

In 2017, she released her Billboard charting single U Got Me Trapped.

==== Charted singles ====
Title	Year	Peak chart positions
"Oooh..."	2006	82
"Phone Talk"	2006	76
"U Got Me Trapped"	2017	3
