= Madison Cawein =

American poet (1865–1914)

Madison Julius Cawein
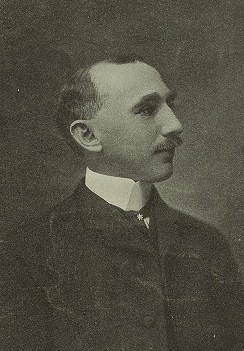
- Cawein (c. 1905)
- Born: March 23, 1865; Louisville, Kentucky, U.S.
- Died: December 8, 1914 (aged 49)
- Resting place: Cave Hill Cemetery, Louisville, Kentucky, U.S.
- Occupation: Poet

Madison Julius Cawein (March 23, 1865 – December 8, 1914) was a poet from Louisville, Kentucky.

== Biography ==
Madison Julius Cawein was born in Louisville, Kentucky on March 23, 1865, the fifth child of William and Christiana (Stelsly) Cawein. His father made patent medicines from herbs. Thus as a child, Cawein became acquainted with and developed a love for local nature. Madison Cawein lived in Louisville his entire life, with the exception of three years spent in New Albany, Indiana, as a teenager.

After graduating from Louisville Male High School in 1886, Cawein worked in a pool hall in Louisville as a cashier in Waddill's New-market, which also served as a gambling house. He worked there for six years, saving his pay so he could return home to write.

His output was thirty-six books and 1,500 poems. His writing presented Kentucky scenes in a language echoing Percy Bysshe Shelley and John Keats. He soon earned the nickname the "Keats of Kentucky". He was popular enough that, by 1900, he told the Louisville Courier-Journal that his income from publishing poetry in magazines amounted to about $100 a month.

In 1912 Cawein was forced to sell his Old Louisville home, St. James Court (a 2 1/2-story brick house built in 1901, which he had purchased in 1907), as well as some of his library, after losing money in the 1912 stock market crash. In 1914, the Authors Club of New York City placed him on their relief list. He died on December 8, 1914, and was buried in Cave Hill Cemetery.

== Influence ==
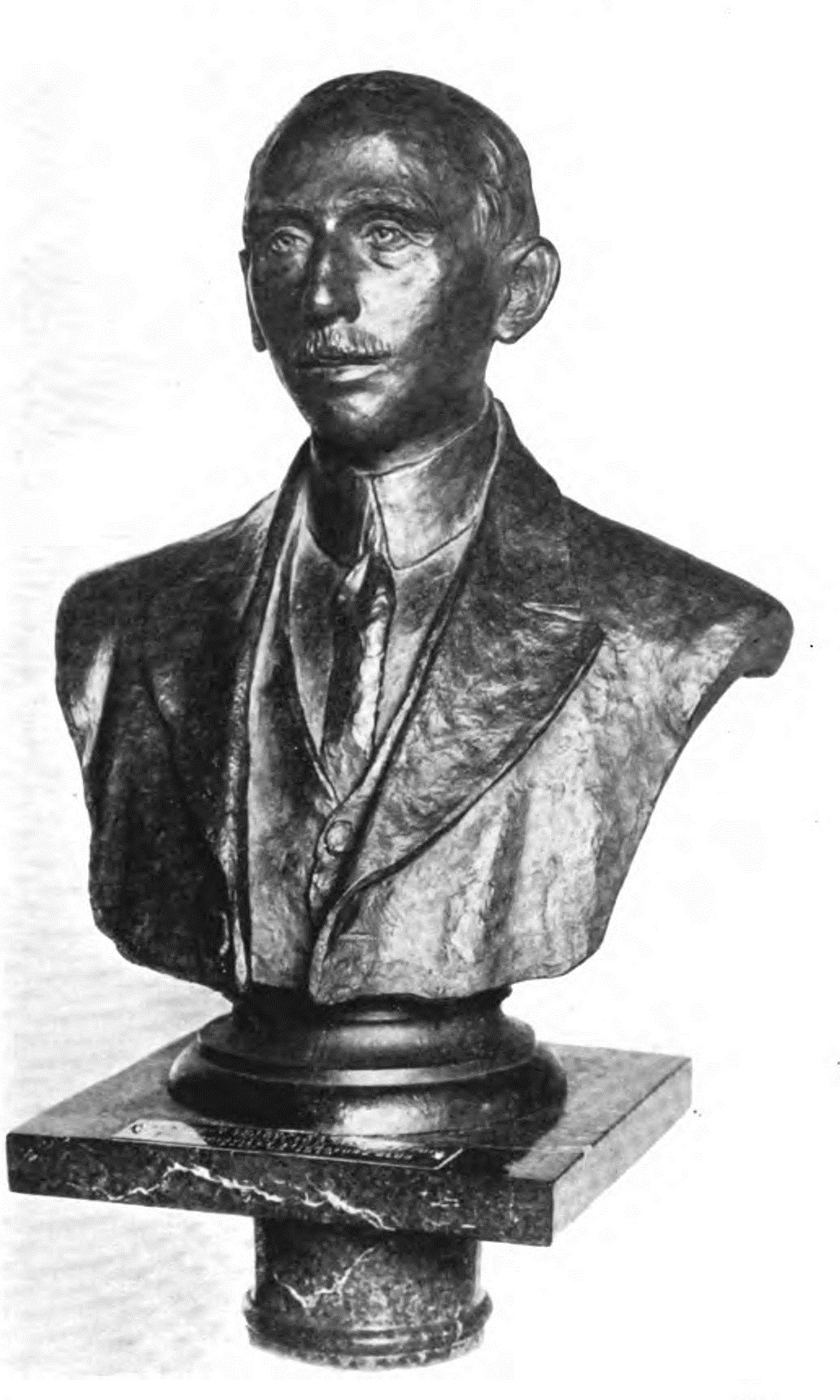
Bronze bust of Cawein by arist J. L. Roop, 1913

Cawein is acknowledged as the first Kentucky poet to earn a national reputation. In April 1913, the Louisville Literature Club unveiled a bronze bust of the poet by J. L. Roop to the Louisville Free Public Library. The public ceremony included letters of praise from Wilbur D. Nesbit, William Morton Payne, James Whitcomb Riley, and others. After his death at a young age, however, he was mostly forgotten until a more recent revival recognized the farsightedness of his writing.

In 1913, a year before his death, Cawein published a poem called "Waste Land" in a Chicago magazine which included Ezra Pound as an editor. Scholars have identified this poem as an inspiration to T. S. Eliot's poem The Waste Land, published in 1922 and considered the birth of modernism in poetry.

The link between his work and Eliot's was pointed out by Canadian academic Robert Ian Scott in The Times Literary Supplement in 1995. The following year Bevis Hillier drew more comparisons in The Spectator (London) with other poems by Cawein; he compared Cawein's lines "...come and go/Around its ancient portico" with Eliot's "...come and go/talking of Michelangelo."

Cawein's "Waste Land" appeared in the January 1913 issue of Chicago magazine Poetry (which also contained an article by Ezra Pound on London poets).

Cawein's poetry allied his love of nature with a devotion to earlier English and European literature, mythology, and classical allusion. This certainly encompassed much of T. S. Eliot's own interest, but whereas Eliot was also seeking a modern language and form, Cawein strove to maintain a traditional approach. Although he gained an international reputation, he has been eclipsed as the genre of poetry in which he worked became increasingly outmoded.

== Works ==
=== Volumes of poetry ===
- Blooms of the Berry, J. P. Morton (Louisville, KY), 1887.
- The Triumph of Music and Other Lyrics, J. P. Morton, 1888.
- Accolon of Gaul, with Other Poems, J. P. Morton, 1889.
- Lyrics and Idyls, J. P. Morton, 1890.
- Days and Dreams: Poems, Putnam (New York and London), 1891.
- Moods and Memories: Poems, Putnam, 1892.
- Red Leaves and Roses: Poems, Putnam, 1893.
- Poems of Nature and Love, Putnam, 1893.
- Intimations of the Beautiful, and Poems, Putnam, 1894.
- The White Snake and Other Poems, Translated from the German into the Original Meters, J. P. Morton, 1895.
- Undertones, Copeland & Day (Boston), 1896.
- The Garden of Dreams, J. P. Morton, 1896.
- Shapes and Shadows: Poems, R. H. Russell (New York, NY), 1898.
- Idyllic Monologues: Old and New World Verses, J. P. Morton, 1898.
- Myth and Romance, Being a Book of Verse, Putnam, 1899.
- One Day & Another: A Lyrical Eclogue, Badger (Boston), 1901.
- Weeds by the Wall: Verses, J. P. Morton, 1901.
- Kentucky Poems, Dutton (New York, NY), 1902.
- A Voice on the Wind and Other Poems, J. P. Morton, 1902.
- The Vale of Tempe: Poems, Dutton, 1905.
- Nature-Notes and Impressions, Dutton, 1906.
- The Poems of Madison Cawein. Volumes 1–5. Small, Maynard (Boston), 1907.
- An Ode Read August 15, 1907, at the Dedication of the Monument Erected at Gloucester, Massachusetts, in Commemoration of the Founding of Massachusetts Bay Colony in the Year Sixteen Hundred and Twenty-Three, J. P. Morton, 1908.
- New Poems, Grant Richards (London), 1909.
- The Giant and the Star: Little Annals in Rhyme, Small, Maynard, 1909.
- The Shadow Garden (A Phantasy) and Other Plays, Putnam, 1910.
- Poems by Madison Cawein, Macmillan (New York, NY), 1911.
- The Poet, the Fool and the Faeries, Small, Maynard, 1912.
- The Republic, A Little Book of Homespun Verse, Stewart & Kidd (Cincinnati), 1913.
- Minions of the Moon: A Little Book of Song and Story, Stewart & Kidd, 1913.
- The Poet and Nature and the Morning Road, J. P. Morton, 1914.
- The Cup of Comus: Fact and Fancy, Cameo Press (New York, NY), 1915.

=== Brochures ===
- Let Us Do the Best We Can, P.F. Volland (Chicago), 1909.
- So Many Ways, P. F. Volland, 1911.
- The Message of the Lilies, P. F. Volland, 1913.
- Christmas Rose and Leaf, Forest Craft Guild (New York), 1913.
- Whatever the Path, Forest Craft Guild, 1913.
- The Days of Used to Be, Forest Craft Guild, 1913.

=== Anthology contributions ===
- Library of Southern Literature, edited by Edwin Anderson Alderman and Joel Chandler Harris, Martin & Hoyt (New Orleans), 1907
- Modern American Poetry: A Critical Anthology, 4th revised edition, edited by Louis Untermeyer, Harcourt (New York, NY), 1930.
