= Judy Gaines Young Book Award =

The Judy Gaines Young Book Award is given annually by Transylvania University to honor the author of a book of distinction written in the Appalachian region in the previous two or three years. The award was endowed in 2015 by Dr. Byron Young, a Lexington-area professor and neurologist, in honor of his late wife.

The program is currently coordinated by Transylvania Professor of English Martha Billips and Poet-in-Residence Maurice Manning.

== Winners ==
- 2015 – Holly Goddard Jones for The Next Time You See Me
- 2016 – Amy Greene for Long Man
- 2017 – Crystal Wilkinson for The Birds of Opulence
- 2018 – Kathleen Driskell for Next Door to the Dead
- 2019 – Silas House for Southernmost
- 2020 – Frank X Walker for Last Will, Last Testament
- 2021 – Robert Gipe for the Canard County trilogy (Trampoline, Weedeater, and Pop)
- 2022 – Jeff Worley

== Past Nominees ==
=== 2015 ===
- Ron Houchin for The Man Who Saws Us in Half
- George Ella Lyon for Many-Storied House
- Jeff Daniel Marion for Letters to the Dead
- Allison Seay for To See the Queen
- Lee Smith for Guests on Earth

=== 2016 ===
- Robert Gipe for Trampoline (first nomination)
- T. J. Jarrett for Zion
- Jeremy B. Jones for Bearwallow
- Denton Loving for Crimes Against Birds
- George Ella Lyon for What Forest Knows

=== 2017 ===
- Lee Smith for Dimestore

=== 2018 ===
- Darnell Arnoult for Galaxie Wagon
- Robert Gipe for Trampoline (second nomination)
- Mark Powell for Small Treasons
- Mary Ann Taylor-Hall for Out of Nowhere
