= Silas House =

American writer (born 1971)

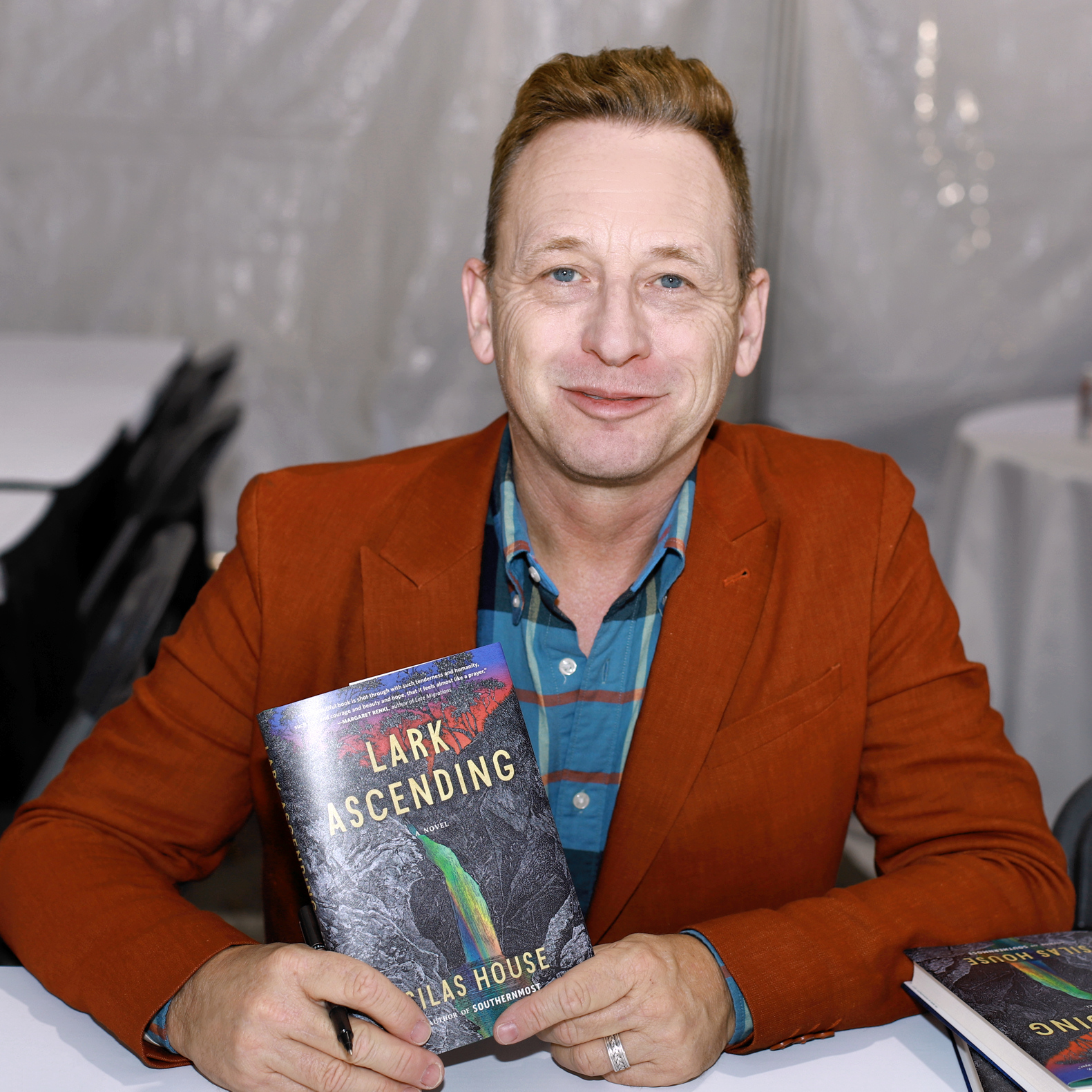
- House at the 2022 Texas Book Festival
- Born: Silas Dwane House; August 7, 1971 (age 55); Corbin, Kentucky, U.S.
- Education: Eastern Kentucky University (BA); Spalding University (MFA)
- Occupations: Novelist; music journalist; columnist
- Spouse: Jason Kyle Howard
- Children: 2
- Writing career
- Period: 2001–present
- Genre: Southern literature
- Subject: Music
- Website: www.silas-house.com

Silas Dwane House (born August 7, 1971) is an American writer best known for his novels. He is also a music journalist, environmental activist, and columnist. His fiction is known for its attention to the natural world, working-class characters, and the plight of the rural place and rural people. House is also known as a representative for LGBTQ Appalachians and Southerners, and is among the most visible LGBTQ people associated with rural America.

== Early life and education ==
House was born in Corbin, Kentucky, and grew up in nearby rural Lily, in the tri-county area of Knox County, Laurel County, and Whitley County Kentucky. He also spent much of his childhood in nearby Leslie County, Kentucky, which he has cited as the basis for the fictional Crow County, the setting for his first three novels. He has degrees from Eastern Kentucky University (BA in English with emphasis on American literature), and from Spalding University (Master of Fine Arts in Creative Writing).

In 2000, House was chosen as one of the ten emerging talents in the South by the Millennial Gathering of Writers at Vanderbilt University. At the time, he was a rural mail carrier. He sold his first novel shortly thereafter.

== Writing ==
House's first novel, Clay's Quilt, was published in 2001. It appeared on the New York Times Best Seller list and became a word-of-mouth success throughout the Southern United States. It was a finalist for both the Southeast Booksellers' Association Fiction Award and the Appalachian Writers' Association Book of the Year Award.

He published his novel A Parchment of Leaves in 2003, which became a national bestseller and was nominated for several major awards. The book was a finalist for the Southern Book Critics' Circle Prize and won the Award for Special Achievement from the Fellowship of Southern Writers, the Chaffin Award for Literature, the Kentucky Novel of the Year Award, and others.

House's next book, The Coal Tattoo (2004), was a finalist for the Southern Book Critics' Circle Prize, and won the Appalachian Writers' Association Book of the Year Award, the Kentucky Novel of the Year Award, and others. House's work has been championed by such acclaimed writers as Lee Smith, Brad Watson, and Larry Brown, all of whom were mentors for House. Barbara Kingsolver has said in print that House is one of her "favorite writers and favorite human beings", and environmental writer and activist Wendell Berry has expressed his appreciation of House many times, including during an interview with the New York Times.

House published Something's Rising with creative nonfiction writer Jason Kyle Howard in March 2009. The book is a series of profiles of various anti-mountaintop removal activists from the region, including musicians Jean Ritchie and Kathy Mattea, author Denise Giardina, and activist Judy Bonds. The book was called "revelatory" by esteemed author and oral historian Studs Terkel, in his last blurb. Writers Lee Smith and Hal Crowther co-authored the introduction.

House's fourth novel, Eli the Good, was published in September 2009 to great acclaim. The book emerged as a number one bestseller on the Southern lists and received the first annual Storylines Prize from the New York Public Library system, an award given to a book for use in the ESL and literacy programs of New York City, as well as an E.B. White Award given by the American Booksellers Association.

His short story "Recruiters", which appeared in Anthology of Appalachian Writing, Vol. 2, also has a Larkspur Press edition from Kentucky's Artisan Printer. This special edition is illustrated by Arwen Donahue and includes the original song "Brennen's Ballad" by Sue Massek, which was the inspiration for the story.

House's first book written for elementary-aged children, Same Sun Here, was co-written with Neela Vaswani and published in February 2012. The book was the winner of the Parent's Choice Award and was the #1 Most Recommended Book by Independent Booksellers in the nation in the spring of 2012. House and Vaswani recorded the highly successful audiobook version of the novel, which won an Earphones Award, and the Audie Award for Best Narration for Children's Title Ages 8–12, the highest honor given to audiobooks. The novel won over a dozen awards, including the Nautilus Award and a South Asian Book Association Honor Book.

House's sixth novel, Southernmost, was published in June 2018 and was long-listed for the Andrew Carnegie Medal for Excellence in Fiction. The book was a SIBA bestseller and received wide acclaim, especially among other writers, including Dorothy Allison, Jennifer Haigh, Lee Smith, and Garth Greenwell. It won the 2019 Judy Gaines Young Book Award, given by Transylvania University annually to recognize an excellent book from the Appalachian region. The book won the Weatherford Award for Fiction, was longlisted for the 2019 Andrew Carnegie Medal, and was short-listed for the Willie Morris Award for Southern Fiction.

House's seventh novel, Lark Ascending, was released in the fall of 2022 and was an immediate indie bestseller, a USA Today bestseller, and winner of the 2023 Southern Book Prize in the category of fiction. The book received praise from authors such as Barbara Kingsolver, Billy O'Callaghan, Wiley Cash, Margaret Renkl, and Michelle Gallen. The novel is considered a departure for House, as it is set twenty years in the future, mostly in Ireland. House has said the book is his mediation on grief, the demise of democracy, and the climate crisis.

House's writing has appeared several times in The New York Times (including his hugely popular essay "The Art of Being Still") and The Atlantic. His work has also appeared in Time, The Washington Post, The Bitter Southerner, and other publications. In 2022 one of his essays was chosen by editor Alexander Chee for the book The Best American Essays 2022. House's work has been anthologized in New Stories From the South: The Year's Best, 2004 and Best Food Writing: 2014. He wrote the introductions to Missing Mountains, a study of mountaintop removal; From Walton's Mountain to Tomorrow, a biography of Earl Hamner, Jr.; and Gregory of Nyssa's Life of Moses, a new edition by HarperCollins. House's essays and short stories have been featured on NPR's All Things Considered several times during his time there as a commentator.

House is also a playwright. In 2005, he wrote the play The Hurting Part, which was produced by the University of Kentucky. In 2009 his second play, Long Time Travelling, was produced by the Actor's Guild of Lexington (Kentucky). In 2012, Berea College Laboratory Theatre presented his controversial play, This Is My Heart For You, about a small town divided by a gay rights discrimination case and hate crime. The latter two plays were both subsequently staged at the Contemporary American Theatre Festival in Shepherdstown, West Virginia.

From 2021 to 2025, House served as editor of the imprint Fireside Industries at the University Press of Kentucky.

Books he has acquired and edited there include Even as We Breathe by Annette Saunooke Clapsaddle, the first novel to be published by an enrolled member of the Eastern Band of Cherokee; Daughters of Muscadine by Monic Ductan (2024 Tennessee Book of the Year Award-Novel); The Girl Singer by Marianne Worthington (2023 Weatherford Book of the Year Award); and Drowned Town by Jayne Moore Waldrop (2022 Foreword Indies Book of the Year Award).

== Academic career ==
House served as a writer in residence at Eastern Kentucky University in 2004–2005 and at Lincoln Memorial University in 2005–2010. At LMU he also created and directed the Mountain Heritage Literary Festival and the Appalachian Reading Series. In 2010, House became the NEH Chair in Appalachian Studies at Berea College in Berea, Kentucky, where he teaches Appalachian Literature and a writing workshop. He served for one year, 2011–2012, as interim director of the Loyal Jones Appalachian Center. He has served on the fiction faculty at Spalding University's MFA in Creative Writing since 2005.

In 2010, House was the focus of the Silas House Literary Festival at Emory and Henry College in Emory, Virginia. The same year he was chosen as Appalachian Writer of the Year by Shepherd University in Shepherdstown, West Virginia.

== Music writing ==
House is also a music journalist and served as a contributing editor to No Depression magazine. He has written features on artists such as Kacey Musgraves, Lucinda Williams, Nickel Creek, Jason Isbell, and many others. House is also an in-demand press kit writer for Nashville's music business, having written press kit biographies for artists including Kris Kristofferson, Jason Isbell, Tyler Childers, Lucinda Williams, Buddy Miller, S.G. Goodman, Del McCoury, and Lee Ann Womack. In 2001 and 2002, he was a regular contributor to NPR's All Things Considered.

He also wrote the story for the controversial music video of "In Your Love" by Tyler Childers, depicting the tragic love story of two gay coal miners. He also served as a co-producer and the creative director for the piece, which became the #1 video on Spotify, Apple, and YouTube. For this work, House was a finalist for the 2024 GRAMMY award for Best Music Video, and was nominated by the Academy of Country Music for Best Music Video.

== Activism ==
Between 2005 and 2010 House was very visible in the fight against mountaintop removal mining, an environmentally devastating form of coal mining that blasts the entire top off a mountain and fills the valley below with debris. He became involved in the issue after being invited on a tour of devastated mountains by environmentalist, author, and public intellectual Wendell Berry. House wrote the original draft of the 2005 Kentucky authors' statement against the practice, which more than three dozen authors signed.

House has been joined in this fight by other Kentucky writers, such as Wendell Berry, Bobbie Ann Mason, and Maurice Manning.

== Personal life ==
House was born and raised in Southeastern Kentucky, and presently lives in Lexington. He has two children from a previous marriage, and is now married to writer and editor Jason Kyle Howard. House is an Episcopalian.

== Awards and honors ==
House was a 2024 finalist for a Grammy Award for his work as writer, producer, and creative director of the music video "In Your Love" by Tyler Childers. This marked the tenth time in history that a country music video had been nominated for a Grammy.

May 25 is Silas House Day in Lexington, Kentucky. This day is observed annually beginning in 2023 after a proclamation by the city council and Mayor Linda Gorton.

In 2018 House's novel Southernmost was long-listed for the Carnegie Medal for Excellence in Fiction and short-listed for the Willie Morris Award for Southern Fiction, as well as winning the Weatherford Award for Best Novel and the Judy Gaines Young Award in 2019. In 2017, House was inducted into the Fellowship of Southern Writers. He has been awarded three honorary doctorates. His other awards include the Nautilus, the Storylines Prize, the Hobson Medal for Literature, the Intellectual Freedom Award from the National Council of English Teachers, the Appalachian Book of the Year, the Lee Smith Award, the James Still Award from the Fellowship of Southern Writers, and the Jesse Stuart Media Prize, two Kentucky Novel of the Year awards. In 2016 he was invited to speak at the Library of Congress.

In 2021 House was honored with the Artist Award from the Governors Award for the Arts, chosen by Kentucky governor Andy Beshear, recognizing House's contributions to the arts in his home state.

In 2022, House was given the largest monetary prize for an LGBTQ writer in the United States. The Jim Duggins Outstanding Mid-Career Novelists' Prize is awarded through Lambda Literary.

In 2023 House was one of five judges to select the National Book Award in the category of Fiction.

He was named Kentucky Poet Laureate by Governor Beshear in 2023. Those honors are to lead the state in promotion of literary arts and activities. Nominees are collected by the Kentucky Arts Council, and reviewed by an independent panel with recommendations sent to the governor. The Republican Governor's Association immediately used House in an attack ad against Beshear, calling House a "radical". The attack was criticized by the media and by well-known personalities such as Jason Isbell, Charles Booker, and others.

In 2023 House's novel Lark Ascending was also given the Gold Medal designation by the Nautilus Book Awards, was chosen by Booklist as an "Editor's Choice", and won the Southern Book Prize.

On December 12, 2023, House read his poem "Those Who Carry Us" at the second inauguration of Governor Beshear.

In 2026 House was awarded his second Southern Book Prize for his collection of poetry, All These Ghosts.

In 2026 House was inducted into the Kentucky Writers Hall of Fame.

== Works ==
- 2001 Clay's Quilt (novel)
- 2003 A Parchment of Leaves (novel)
- 2004 The Coal Tattoo (novel)
- 2005 The Hurting Part (play)
- 2008 The Hurting Part (published playscript)
- 2009 Something's Rising (non-fiction, co-authored with Jason Howard)
- 2009 Long Time Travelling (play)
- 2009 Eli the Good (novel)
- 2009 Coal Country (edited by Silas House, Shirley Stewart Burns, and Mari Lyn Evans)
- 2011 Chinaberry (a novel by James Still, edited by Silas House)
- 2012 This Is My Heart For You (play)
- 2012 Same Sun Here (novel, co-authored with Neela Vaswani)
- 2018 Southernmost (novel)
- 2022 Lark Ascending (novel)
- 2025 Dead Man Blues (novel, as S.D. House)
- 2025 All These Ghosts (poetry)
- 2026 The Tulip Poplars (novel, coming October 13, 2026)
