= Foust (artist) =

American artist and printmaker

Foust is a Richmond, Virginia-based artist, writer, and cartoonist. She is predominantly a linocut printmaker.

== Education ==
She studied art at the Philadelphia College of Art, and later at Spalding University in Louisville, KY, where she was awarded an MFA in writing.

== Artwork ==
Foust has been creating hand-made linocut prints for over 30 years, using the same spoon as the burnisher for the printmaking process. She exhibits in galleries, but mostly she sells her work in about 30 art festivals a year.

Why she does art festivals:

Foust started doing art festivals about 11 years ago at the urging of an artist friend. "I didn't think my work would sell at festivals," she says. "It's kind of depressing." She did unexpectedly well and has been successful ever since, showing at about 15 festivals a year. Part of her success, she admits, is probably due to the "depressing" nature of her work. It certainly stands out at festivals that are often dominated by perky watercolor paintings. "I never thought that would be a marketing point," she says, laughing. "… I think my work is a little bit more aggressive [than typical art-show fare]. It's hard for me to do something that's happy that's not nauseating. I tend to like dark humor. I think my work is funny in a dark sort of way."

She is also a widely published writer, and her writing has been published by Minnetonka Review, SmokeLong Quarterly, Word Riot, Flash Me, Flapper House, and ExPatLit. Her short-story collection, Sins of Omission, (Tidal Press ISBN 978-0984661749) was published in 2015. A book of her cartoons, Six of One, Half-dozen of the Other, also by Tidal Press ISBN 978-0984661763, was also published in 2015.

Her work has been awarded a grant from the British Arts Council. The Washington Post described her work from a solo show in Washington, DC's Fraser Gallery as "her black-and-white works are small, figurative and vaguely reminiscent of woodcuts by the German expressionists."
