= David Allen Patterson =

American academic of Native American health (1963–2021)

- Born: October 30, 1963; Kentucky, U.S.
- Died: May 14, 2021 (aged 57)

David Allen Patterson (October 30, 1963 – May 14, 2021), also known as Silver Wolf (Cherokee: Adelv unegv Waya) was an American researcher, author, and Native American advocate. He was the first professor of Native American descent in the George Warren Brown School of Social Work at Washington University in St. Louis. He is known for his research and active involvement in Native American health, retention of Native American college students, treatment retention for alcohol and drug addiction, and finding solutions to barriers to best practices adoption in community-based organizations.

Patterson wrote a blog on Native American wellness and published academic work on the subjects of education, mental health and addiction.

== Early life and education ==
Patterson was born in Kentucky to Betty (née Allen) and Coleman Sidwell Patterson, the youngest of their three sons. Patterson was of Cherokee descent through his mother and Irish descent through his father, but did not connect with his Cherokee heritage until he was an adult. From a young age, he struggled with alcoholism, drug addiction, and depression; he dropped out of high school and attempted suicide at age 18. With the help of his uncle, he began working to improve his mental health and to find employment.

Patterson began working as a garbage man for Waste Management in Louisville in his mid-twenties, and eventually became sober. Going against the advice of Vocational Rehabilitation, David Patterson quit his job, sold most of his belongings and entered Volunteers of America as an unpaid resident manager in 1991. He began taking classes at Jefferson Community College in Louisville, KY. He lived at the VOA for over two years while attending community college.

At age 27, he enrolled at Spalding University, and graduated with a Bachelor of Social Work in 1996. Patterson completed a Master of Social Work in 1997 and became a certified social worker in 1998. He graduated with his Ph.D. from the University of Louisville's Kent School of Social Work in 2006.

== Career ==
Patterson began his academic career as an assistant professor at the University at Buffalo, where he studied "solutions for Native American substance abuse and high dropout rates". During his tenure there, he founded a number of programs to benefit Native American students, most notably the Native American Center for Wellness Research (for which he was director for five years), the Wolf-Fire scholarship, and a Native American living and learning community.

Patterson was then an assistant professor at the George Warren Brown School of Social Work at Washington University in St. Louis, where he worked closely with the Buder Center Scholars. He was the first professor of Native American descent at the school. He was also an IHART fellow.

== Personal life and death ==
Patterson was diagnosed with glioblastoma in late 2020, dying from the disease on May 15, 2021.

== Publications ==
Patterson published articles in Research on Social Work Practice, The Journal of Higher Education, Journal of Social Service Research, Journal of College Student Retention: Research, Theory & Practice, Journal of Sociology and Social Welfare, Alcoholism Treatment Quarterly, and Counselor, among others. He was also the author of the Native American Commitment to Wellness & Respect Blog.

=== Books ===
- Patterson Silver Wolf, David A. (2021). The New Addiction Treatment: From Good Intentions and Bad Intuitions to Data, Performance, and Technology. New York: Oxford University Press. ISBN 978-0-19-760137-2.

=== Articles ===
- Cloud, Richard N.; Besel, K.; Bledsoe, L.; Golder, S.; McKiernan, P.; Pattern, D.; Ziegler, C. H. (2006). "Adapting Motivational Interviewing Strategies to Increase Posttreatment 12-Step Meeting Attendance". Alcoholism Treatment Quarterly. 24 (3): 31–53. doi:10.1300/J020v24n03_03. S2CID 143553006.
- Patterson Silver Wolf, DA; Maguin, E; Dulmus, CN; Nisbet, BC (2011). "Measuring a Community-Based Mental Health Organization's Culture and Climate Scores Stability". Social Work in Mental Health. 9 (6): 435–444. doi:10.1080/15332985.2011.575720. PMC 3526120. PMID 23264755.
- Patterson Silver Wolf, David A.; Dulmus, Catherine; Wilding, Greg; Barczykowski, Amy; Yu, Jihnhee; Beeler-Stinn, Sara; Asher Blackdeer, Autumn; Harvey, Steven; Rodriguez, Nicole M. (2021-10-02). "Profiles and Predictors of Treatment-Resistant Opioid Use Disorder (TROUD): A Secondary Data Analysis of Treatment Episode Data Set's 2017 Admissions". Alcoholism Treatment Quarterly. 39 (4): 517–532. doi:10.1080/07347324.2021.1895015. ISSN 0734-7324. S2CID 233645330.
- Patterson Silver Wolf, David A.; BlackDeer, Autumn Asher; Beeler-Stinn, Sara; Zheng, Ken; Stazrad, Kristin (2021-11-23). "Performance-Based Practice: Clinical Dashboards for Addiction Treatment Retention". Research on Social Work Practice. 31 (2): 205–211. doi:10.1177/1049731520972798. ISSN 1049-7315. S2CID 229484117.
- Patterson Silver Wolf, David A.; Ramsey, Alex T.; Epstein, Joel; Beeler-Stinn, Sara; Asher Black Deer, Autumn (2020-06-18). "Bridges to Sobriety: Testing the Feasibility and Acceptability of a Mobile App Designed to Supplement an Adolescent Substance Use Disorder Treatment Program". Clinical Social Work Journal. 50 (3): 308–315. doi:10.1007/s10615-020-00765-w. ISSN 1573-3343. PMC 9678348. PMID 36420447. S2CID 220508688.

=== Monographs ===
- Patterson Silver Wolf (Adelv unegv Waya), David (2015-04-30). "An Education Saved My Life: Silver Wolf's Path to Promise". Books and Monographs. Washington University Libraries. doi:10.7936/K7028PP6.
