= Clay's Quilt =

2001 novel by Silas House

- Author: Silas House
- Language: English
- Publication date: 2001

Clay's Quilt is a 2001 novel by Silas House, first published by Algonquin Books of Chapel Hill and reissued by Ballantine/Random House in 2003. The book appeared briefly on the New York Times bestseller list and became a word-of-mouth sleeper hit, especially in the Southern United States. The book was critically acclaimed, was praised by writers such as Lee Smith and Chris Offutt, was featured in USA Today and The New York Times, and led to House being compared to writers such as Larry Brown and being identified as a writer of the "Rough South", a definition subsequent books challenged. The book also resulted in House serving as a commentator for NPR's All Things Considered for the next year. The novel immediately established House as one of the leading writers of the Appalachian region. The book is still widely taught in high schools and universities. After being in print for 17 years by Ballantine Books, a new edition was published by Blair in July 2020 with a new foreword by acclaimed singer-songwriter Tyler Childers, who has often cited the book as an influence on his own writing.

== Plot ==
Clay Sizemore is in his mid-twenties and has tired of his living-for-the-weekend lifestyle. Much of his life has been defined by an event from his childhood: at age four he witnessed his mother's murder during a terrible snowstorm. When he meets an attractive fiddler named Alma, he decides that it is time to take control of his own story. There are complications with Alma's recent ex-husband that drive home the theme of cyclical violence. As Clay tries to find out the truth about how and why his mother was killed, he falls into a situation that reveals we all have the capability to be violent, and that we can all choose not to be.

Clay's Quilt gives insight into a misunderstood region, and is one of the few books set in Appalachia that is contemporary to the time in which it was written. House has said this is one of the main reasons he wrote the book, to make up for the lack of literature that shows a nuanced and modern look at Appalachia and the rural South.
