= Pamela Duncan =

Pamela Duncan may refer to:

- Pamela Duncan (novelist) (born 1961), American novelist
- Pamela Duncan (actress) (1924–2005), American B-movie actress
- Pamela Duncan (English actress) (1921–2010), English television actress
