= Crystal Wilkinson =

American poet

Crystal E. Wilkinson
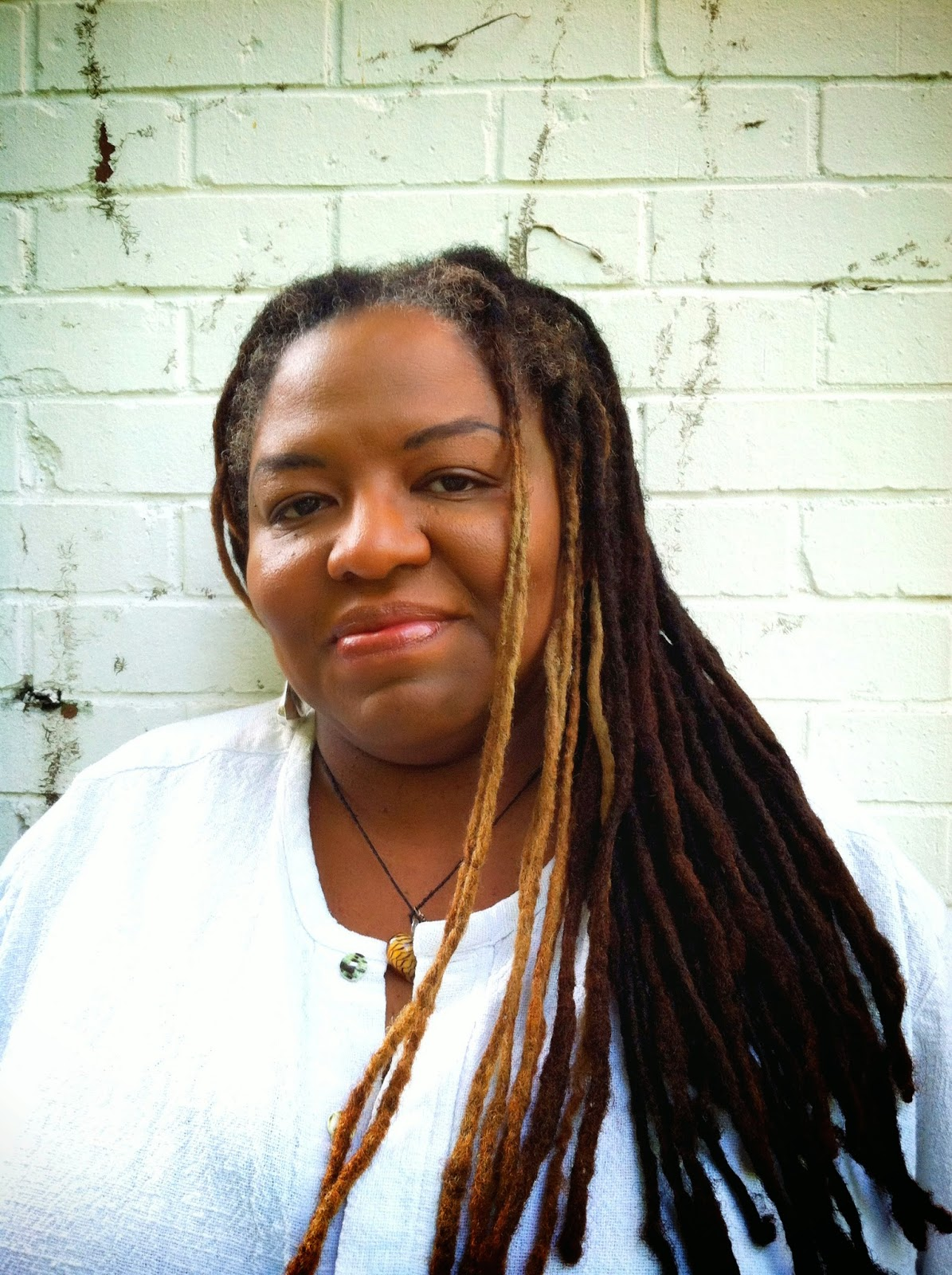
- Born: Hamilton, Ohio, US
- Occupation: Author
- Awards: O. Henry Prize (2021); NAACP Image Award (2022)
- Website: crystalewilkinson.net

Crystal E. Wilkinson is an African-American feminist writer from Kentucky, and proponent of the Affrilachian Poet movement. She is winner of a 2022 NAACP Image Award and a 2021 O. Henry Prize winner; she is a 2020 USA Fellow of Creative Writing. She teaches at the University of Kentucky. Her work has primarily involved the stories of Black women and communities in the Appalachian and rural Southern canon. She was appointed Poet Laureate of Kentucky 2021.

== Early life and education ==
Born in Hamilton, Ohio, Crystal Wilkinson was brought to her grandparents' farm in Indian Creek, Kentucky (about three miles east of Middleburg, Kentucky), when she was six weeks old. They were the only African-American family in the area. Like many farmers in Appalachia, Silas Wilkinson grew cash crops of tobacco and corn and produced sorghum molasses; and, given the few jobs available for African-American women in eastern Kentucky, Christine Wilkinson cleaned and cooked in the homes of the local schoolteachers of Casey County. Wilkinson wrote that she "lived an enchanted childhood" and that her grandparents "gave me the freedom to explore the countryside and to write, to dream, to discover." She wrote about her childhood and her upbringing in her award-winning book, Blackberries, Blackberries:

"I grew up on a farm in Indian Creek, Kentucky during the seventies. I swam in creeks and roamed the knobs and hills. We had an outhouse and no inside running water. Our house was heated by coal and wood-burning stoves and we lived so far back in the woods that we could get only one television station. But it was a place of beauty - trees, green grass and blue sky as far as you could see. I am country. Being country is as much a part of me as my full lips, wide hips, dreadlocks and high cheek bones. There are many Black country folks who have lived and are living in small towns, up hollers and across knobs. They are all over the South—scattered like milk thistle seeds in the wind. The stories in this book are centered in these places."

Wilkinson attended Eastern Kentucky University in nearby Richmond, Kentucky, and graduated with a B.A. degree in Journalism in 1985. In 2003, she earned her Master of Fine Arts degree for Creative Writing from Spalding University in Louisville, Kentucky.

== Career ==
Early in her career, Wilkinson was a public information officer and community relations manager for the Lexington-Fayette Urban County Government, editing their quarterly environmental newsletter and handling media relations for special projects. She also began volunteering her time to public service in Lexington, most notably the Roots and Heritage Festival, helping with publicity and coordinating the literary readings.

During this time, Wilkinson joined other Kentuckian African American writers (including Kelly Norman Ellis, Ricardo Nazario y Colon, Mitchell L. H. Douglas, and Daundra Scisney-Givens) at the Martin Luther King Jr. Cultural Center at the University of Kentucky where Frank X Walker was the assistant director. The group, later called The Affrilachian Poets, was mentored by the poet Nikky Finney who was teaching then at the University of Kentucky. In 2000, Wilkinson published her first volume, the short-story collection Blackberries, Blackberries (The Toby Press, 2000), which would go on to receive the Chaffin Award for Appalachian Literature.

In 1997, Wilkinson became the Assistant Director for the Carnegie Center for Literacy and Learning in Lexington, Kentucky, where she taught short courses and implemented many different programs and activities for Kentucky's literary arts scene. From 1997 to 2001 and again in 2008, she taught high school juniors and seniors who were juried into the creative writing discipline for the Governor's School for the Arts. She also served as chair of the creative writing department from 1997 to 2001. In the spring of 2004, she served as the Writer-in-Residence for the Appalachian College Association, conducting advanced creative writing classes and one-on-one instruction for undergraduate writing students at Cumberland College, Lindsey Wilson College and Berea College. She has taught creative writing at Eastern Kentucky University (2002–2003), Indiana University Bloomington (2004–2007), and at Morehead State University (2007–2013).

As of 2020, Wilkinson is an associate professor at the University of Kentucky in the Department of English, the Program in African American and Africana Studies. She also works with the UK Appalachian Center and the Gaines Center for the Humanities at the University of Kentucky. She currently conducts research in "Creative Writing, Fiction, The Short Story Cycle, Black Culture in Appalachia, Mental Illness in Literature, [and] Women and the Black Rural Landscape".

She and her partner, the artist and poet, Ronald Davis (upfromsumdirt), are the founders and editors of the briefly published Mythium: A Journal of Contemporary Literature, a journal that celebrated writers of color and other cultural voices. They were also co-founders and owners of The Wild Fig Books and Coffee in Lexington, Ky from 2011 until 2018.

Wilkinson has presented many workshops and given readings in the U.S., including:

- the International Conference on the Short Story in English at the University of Iowa
- the Ocean State Writers Conference
- the African American Women Writers Conference at the University of the District of Columbia

Wilkinson was appointed Poet Laureate of Kentucky in 2021. She is the first Black woman appointed to that position.

Wilkinson is featured in several television shows:

- "Coal Black Voices" (2001)
- "GED Connections," Kentucky Educational Television (2001)
- "James Still's Legacy," Kentucky Educational Television (2003)
- "Crystal Wilkinson, Poet," Connections with Renee Shaw, Kentucky Educational Television (2009)

== Awards ==
Wilkinson is the recipient of many awards and fellowships, including the 2016 Ernest Gaines Fellowship for Literary Excellence and the Sallie Bingham Award from the Kentucky Foundation for Women for the promotion of activism and feminist artist expression. In 2006, Wilkinson was the Guest Fiction Editor and featured writer for Nantahala Review. Her short fiction piece "Holler", published in Slice Literary Magazine (Spring/Summer 2010), was nominated for the 2010 Pushcart Prize. Crystal Wilkinson has also gained recognition from the United States Artists in being awarded a position as a 2020 USA Fellow.

=== Blackberries, Blackberries ===
- 2001 Best Debut Fiction, Today's Librarian Magazine
- 2002 Paul and Lillie D. Chaffin Award for Appalachian Literature
- PBS Kentucky Educational Television Book Club Pick
- University of Louisville's Barker Lecture Freshman Book in Common Pick

=== Water Street ===
- 2003 Longlisted for the Orange Prize for Fiction
- 2003 Shortlisted for the Hurston/Wright Legacy Award
- PBS Kentucky Educational Television Book Club Pick
- Utne Reader Book Club Pick
- University of Cincinnati Book in Common Pick
- Nominee for Kentucky Public Librarian's Choice Award

=== The Birds of Opulence ===
- Featured in Oxford American
- Winner of the 10th Ernest J. Gaines Award for Literary Excellence
- Winner of the 2017 Judy Gaines Young Book Award
- Winner of the 2017 Weatherford Award for Appalachian Fiction
- 2016 Appalachian Book of the Year in Fiction
- 2019 Appalachian Heritage Writer's Award

=== Individual works ===
- "My Girl Mona" won the 2002 Fiction Prize by the Indiana Review
- "Terrain" won the 2008 Denny C. Plattner Award in Poetry, from Appalachian Heritage
- "First Sunday Dinner on the Grounds" won Honorable Mention 2008 Denny Plattner Award for Fiction, from Appalachian Heritage

== Published works ==
=== Collections, books ===
- Blackberries, Blackberries (2000). The Toby Press. ISBN 9781902881348.
- Water Street (2002). London: Toby Press. ISBN 9781592640553.
- The Birds of Opulence (2016). Lexington: The University Press of Kentucky. ISBN 9780813166919.
- Perfect Black (2021). Lexington: The University Press of Kentucky. ISBN 978-0813151168.
- Praisesong for the Kitchen Ghosts. Stories and Recipes from Five Generations of Black Country Cooks (2024). New York: Clarkson, Potter. ISBN 9780593236512

=== Short stories ===
- "Dreams and Reality," Obsidian II: Black Literature in Review (1995)
- "Deviled Eggs," Southern Exposure (Fall/Winter 1997)
- "Humming Yesterday," Calyx: A Journal of Art and Literature by Women (Summer 1999)
- "Women Secrets," The Briar Cliff Review (Spring 1999)
- "One Affrilachian Woman's Journey Home," Confronting Stereotypes: Back Talk from an American Region. Dwight B. Billings, Norman Gurney and Katherine Ledford, eds. University Press of Kentucky, 1999.
- "Taking Care," Gifts from Our Grandmothers. Carol Dovi, ed. Crown/Random House, 2000.
- "Mules," African Voices Magazine (August 2000)
- "Tobacco" and "Taking Death Beyond the Personal," LIT (Winter 2001)
- "Humming Back Yesterday," Home and Beyond: A Half Century of Short Stories by Kentucky Writers. Morris Grubbs, ed. University Press of Kentucky, 2001.
- "My Girl Mona," Indiana Review (Spring 2002); and, Gumbo: Black Writers. Marita Golden, ed. Harlem Moon/Doubleday, 2002.
- "The Visit," A Kentucky Christmas. George Ella Lyon, ed. University Press of Kentucky, 2003.
- "Tobacco," Tobacco Anthology. Wind Press, 2004.
- "Novel chapter excerpt from Opulence," Kentucky Humanities, Kentucky Humanities Council (Fall 2004)
- "Healing Warrior Marks: Battling Stress," Surviving in the Hour of Darkness: The Health and Wellness of Women of Colour and Indigenous Women. Sophie Harding, ed. Calgary, Canada: University of Calgary Press, 2005.
- "Taking Care," Surviving in the Hour of Darkness: The Health and Wellness of Women of Colour and Indigenous Women. Sophie Harding, ed. Calgary, Canada: University of Calgary Press, 2005.
- "The Fight," High Horse: Contemporary Writing by the MFA Faculty of Spalding University (May 2005)
- "Spoiled," The Kentucky Anthology: Two Hundred Years of Writing in the Bluegrass State. Wade Hall, ed. University Press of Kentucky (November 2005).
- "Named 'One of the South's Best Writers Not on the Bestseller List'," This Day in the Life: Diaries from Women Across America. Three Rivers Press/Crown/Random House, 2005.
- "Processing Feedback Has to Be Meditation," Toxic Feedback: Helping Writers Survive and Thrive. Joni B. Cole, ed. Lebanon, NH: University Press of New England, 2006.
- "Birth of a Story in an Hour or Less," Write Now. Sherry Ellis, ed. Tarcher Books, division of Penguin (September 2006).
- "Before I Met My Father," Daddy, Can I Tell You Something?: Black Daughters Speak to Their Fathers. Angela Floyd, ed. Sela Press. (Fall 2006)
- "The Water Witch on Reading," Appalachian Heritage (Winter 2006)
- "The Water Witch on Philanthropy," Appalachian Heritage (Spring 2007)
- "Flood: 1962," Torch: Poetry, Prose, and Short Stories by African American Women. Amanda Johnson, ed. (Fall 2007)
- "Witness," Appalachian Heritage (Summer 2008)
- "Third Sunday Dinner on the Grounds, July 1976," Appalachian Heritage (Summer 2008)
- "Flood," Women. Period. Julia Watts, Parneshia Jones, Jo Ruby and Elizabeth Slade, eds. Spinster's Ink (August 2008)
- "Terrain," Appalachian Heritage (Summer 2008); and, Pluck! (Fall 2008)
- "Crop," Art Scene 9 (January/February/March 2009)
- "The Prodigals," Obsidian: Literature in the African Diaspora (Spring/Summer 2010)
- "Holler," Slice Literary Magazine (Spring/Summer 2010)
- "The Man I Loved," Appalachian Heritage (Summer 2010)
- "Holler," Degrees of Elevation. Page Seay and Charles Dodd White, eds. Bottom Dog Press, 2010.

== Professional affiliations ==
- Appalachian College Association
- Berea College
- Cumberland College
- Eastern Kentucky University
- Indiana University-Bloomington
- Lindsey Wilson College
- Morehead State University
- University of Kentucky

== See also ==
- Appalachia
- Nikky Finney
- bell hooks
- Kentucky Foundation for Women
