= Spalding University =

Catholic university in Louisville, Kentucky, US

Coordinates: 38°14′29.4″N 85°45′31.9″W

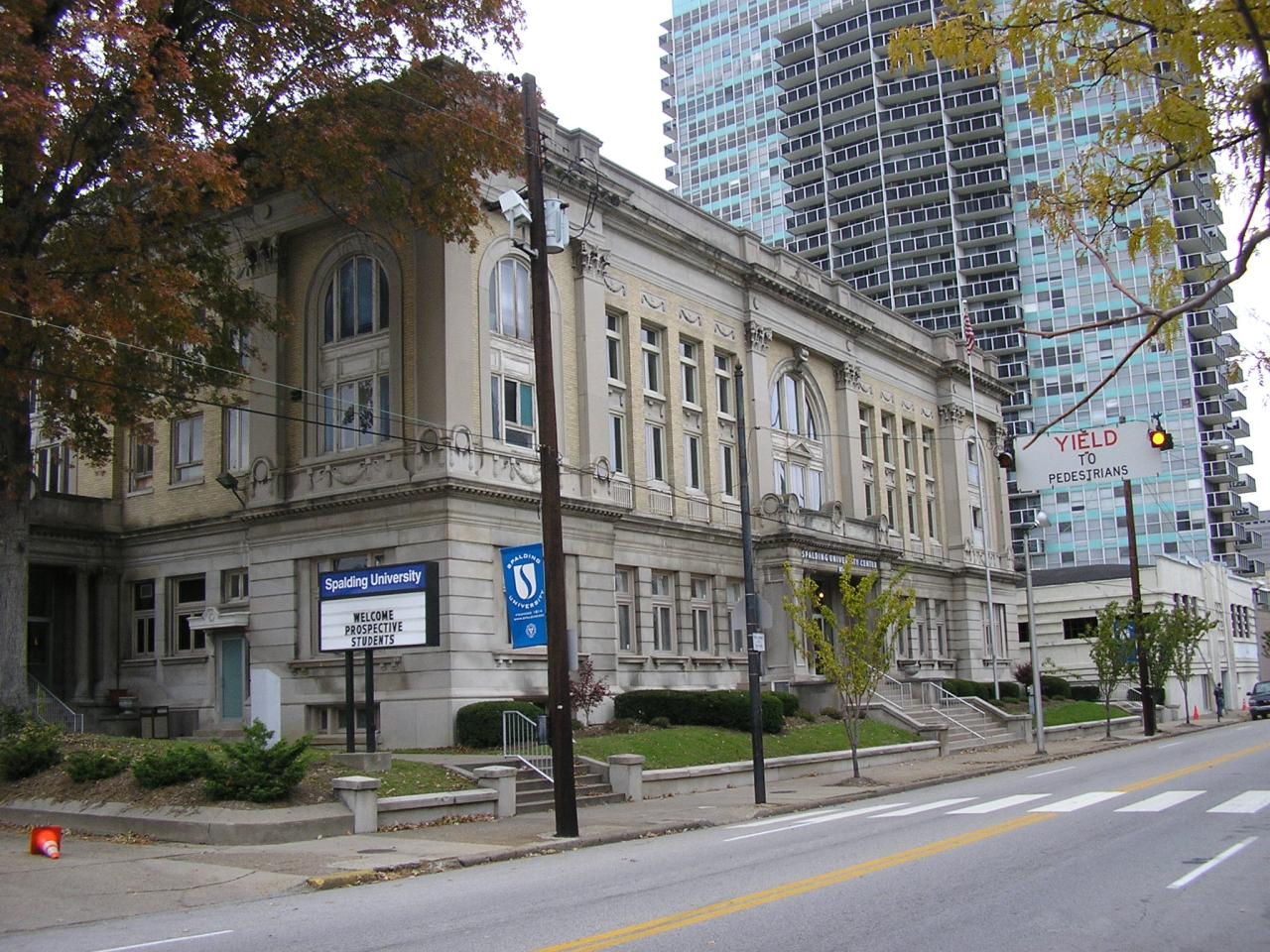
- University building in 2006
- Former name: List: Nazareth Academy (1814–1920); Nazareth College (1920–1961); Nazareth Junior College (1920–1940); Nazareth College at Nazareth (1961–1969); Catherine Spalding College (1961–1969); Spalding College (1969–1984)
- Type: Private
- Established: 1814; 212 years ago
- Religious affiliation: Catholic (Sisters of Charity of Nazareth)
- Academic affiliations: Kentuckiana Metroversity
- President: Anne Kenworthy
- Students: 1,553 (fall 2024)
- Undergraduates: 718 (fall 2024)
- Postgraduates: 835 (fall 2024)
- Location: Louisville, Kentucky, U.S.
- Colors: Blue & gold
- Nickname: Golden Eagles
- Sporting affiliations: NCAA Division III – SLIAC (changed from NAIA in 2007)
- Mascot: Ollie the Eagle
- Website: spalding.edu

Spalding University is a private Catholic university in Louisville, Kentucky, United States. It is affiliated with the Sisters of Charity of Nazareth.

== History ==
Spalding University traces its origins to "Nazareth Academy", one of the oldest educational institution west of the Alleghenies. Nazareth Academy was founded in 1814 by the Sisters of Charity of Nazareth and was located in Nelson County near Bardstown, Kentucky. Spalding was named after Mother Catherine Spalding, foundress of the Sisters.

In 1829 the legislature of the Commonwealth of Kentucky granted the school a charter allowing the school to confer degrees. In 1920, the Sisters opened "Nazareth College" in Louisville, Kentucky's first, four-year, Catholic college for women. The former campus renamed as the "Nazareth Junior College" at the same time but was eventually folded into the main campus in Louisville in 1940. The Louisville and Nazareth campuses merged. In 1961, Nazareth College split into two separate schools, "Nazareth College at Nazareth" and "Catherine Spalding College", before reuniting into one institution in 1969, "Spalding College". Two years later, in 1971, all instructional activity was moved to the Louisville campus. In 1973, Spalding College became co-educational and an independent college in the Catholic tradition open to students of all faiths and backgrounds. In 1984, Spalding College became "Spalding University".

In 2017 Spalding was censured by the American Association of University Professors (AAUP) for terminating the employment of a faculty member without, in the AAUP's opinion, respecting faculty rights and academic freedoms.

== Academics ==
Spalding offers undergraduate and graduate degrees in the areas of business, health sciences, natural sciences, social sciences, humanities, and education.

== Location and facilities ==
Located in downtown Louisville, Spalding University's urban campus is located between the main business/government district of the city and Old Louisville in an area referred to as the South of Broadway (SoBro) neighborhood.

=== 851 mansion ===
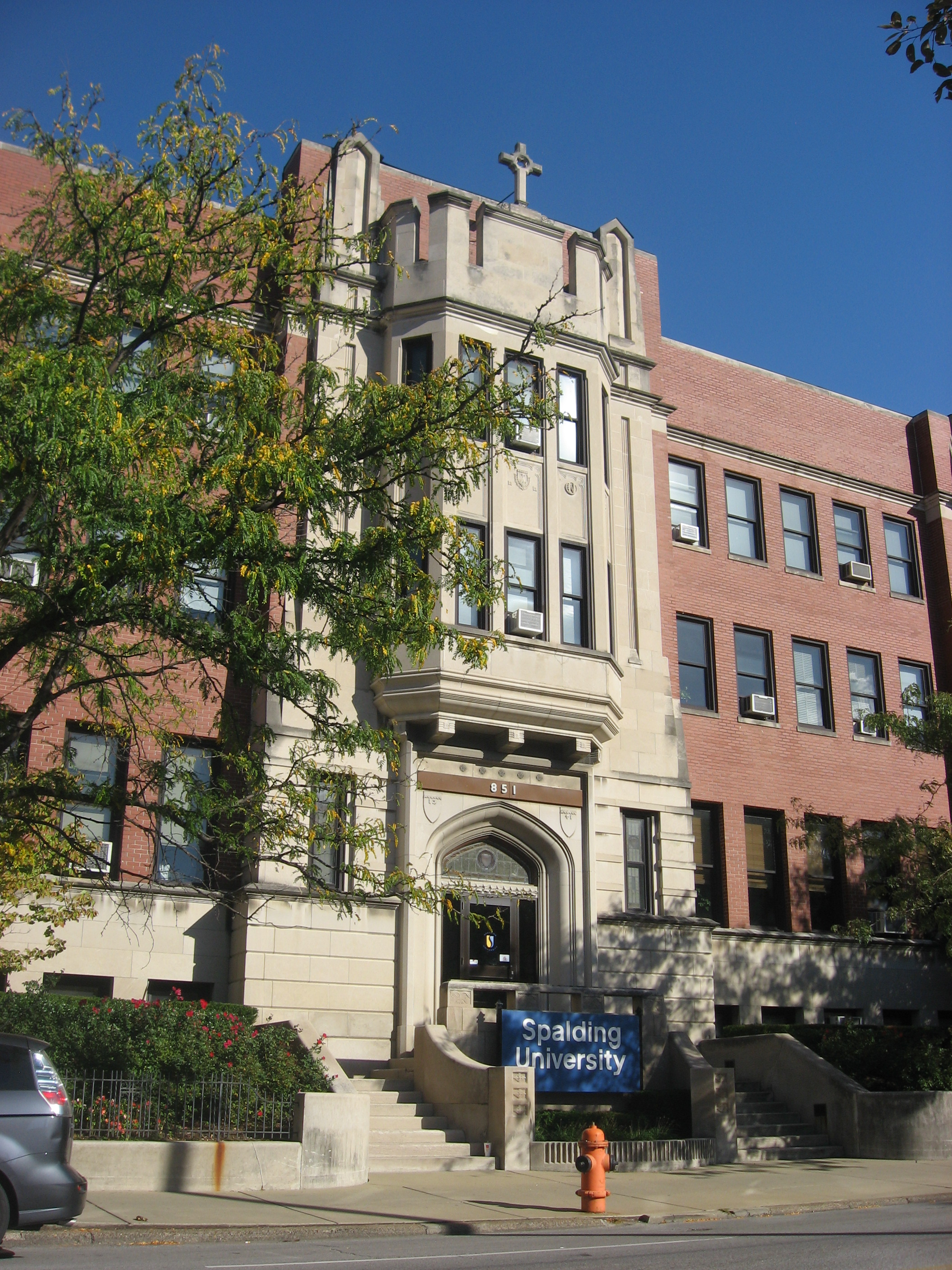
Administration Building

When Spalding University, originally called Nazareth College, opened in 1920, its sole building was the 1871 structure known as the Tompkins-Buchanan-Rankin House. This Italianate building was designed and built by architect Henry Whitestone for the family of Joseph T. Tompkins, a wealthy dry-goods merchant and importer. Later, the Buchanans and Rankins lived here. George C. Buchanan was a distiller who aspired to make the mansion one of the greatest in Louisville, and had it redecorated in 1880. Although the facade of this Italianate structure has disappeared, the north and south sides of the original building are visible; on the north are three deeply projecting bay windows, and on the south, a two-story loggia. In 1918 the residence was vacant, so the Sisters of Nazareth purchased it for $75,000 as the site of the college they planned to open in Louisville. The fact that this house is one door north of Presentation Academy, also operated by the Sisters, was fortunate.

As successive owners occupied the mansion, they added such treasures as a hand-tooled leather ceiling from Florence for one parlor, ebony mantels, and a large hand-carved hat-rack, which Mr. Buchanan purchased at the New Orleans Exposition. The stained glass of the mansion is one of its outstanding features. When Dr. John Coolidge, one-time Director of Harvard's Fogg Art Museum, visited Louisville, he said that Spalding University had the most marvelous display of nineteenth-century stained glass he had ever seen.

Erected in 1942, the Administration Building, which was attached to the front wall of the 1871 building, fills not only the space of the two lots north of the original building but also that of the former terrace in front of the mansion. The old stained glass street number, 851, no longer faces the street, but it still gleams brightly in the passageway between the newer building and the old Whitestone mansion.

In December 1973 the mansion was designated a Kentucky Landmark. It was listed on the National Register of Historic Places in April 1977.

Today, the Mansion and the complex it forms with its adjoining wings are used primarily for academic and faculty offices and classrooms. In addition to all of the College of Education's programs, the academic units based in the Mansion are business, liberal studies, creative and professional writing, psychology, communication and criminal justice studies.

Spalding's Center for Behavioral Health, a nonprofit public clinic supported and staffed by the School of Professional Psychology, is located in the east wing of the complex, and Spalding's Center of Peace and Spiritual Renewal is located on the top floor of the central Mansion. Mass is still held every Tuesday in the Mansion chapel.

The primary administrative operations of Spalding University no longer are housed in the Mansion and now are based in the Egan Leadership Center (901 S. Fourth St.), where the office of admissions, most student services and the academic deans are located, and the Third Street Academic Center (845 S. Fourth St.), where the offices of the president and provost exist, as well as the finance, institutional effectiveness, human resources and advancement/fundraising departments.

=== Egan Leadership Center ===
The Egan Leadership Center is located at 901 South Fourth Street and is named after Spalding's former president, Sister Eileen Egan. Sister Egan served the university for 25 years until her retirement in 1994. Containing over 33,000 square feet (3,100 m^{2}) on three floors, the building houses a 125-seat lectorium and the university bookstore on the first level. The second and third floors house student services offices, such as admissions, the office of the registrar, financial aid, advising and student development and campus life.

=== Teilhard Hall ===
Home of the Spalding art department, with studio classrooms and individual studios offered to students participating in the program.

=== Morrison Hall ===
Originally opened in 1961, the residence formerly known as Our Lady of Louisville Hall only housed 116 students. An addition was constructed and opened in 1968 bumping the total occupancy to 350 residents. In 1970 the hall was renamed in honor of Sister Charles Mary Morrison who served as registrar and Dean from 1925 to 1950. The building no longer houses undergraduate and graduate students as of 2023 due to it being acquired by Simmons College of Kentucky.

=== Spalding Suites ===
The Spalding Suites opened in the fall of 2011 and are designed as apartment-style living for students who choose to live on campus. The Suites were designed for true community living as all residents share a common living room, kitchen and bathroom within their suite.

Residents can choose to live in a private bedroom within an 8-person suite, a double bedroom within an 8-person suite or a double bedroom within a 4-person suite. Bedrooms come equipped with a standard twin size bed, desk and chair, cable box, and wardrobe. All bedrooms have windows and blinds and a private lock.

=== Columbia Gym and connection to Muhammad Ali ===
The building at 824 S. Fourth St. is the home of Spalding's men's and women's basketball and women's volleyball teams, as well as the Golden Eagles' NCAA Division III athletic department. It is also famous as the location where Louisvillian Muhammad Ali was introduced to boxing as a young boy in 1954. At that time, the boxing gym in the lower level of the building was called the Columbia Gym. The lower level of the building is now the site of Spalding's student fitness center, lounge and health clinic as well as the athletic department offices. The first level includes the basketball/volleyball courts as well as a 700-seat auditorium. An upper level includes a ballroom that is used for campus events.

The building's name was changed from Spalding University Center to Columbia Gym on January 17, 2018, in honor of Ali's history there. The renaming took place on what would have been Ali's 76th birthday. The introduction of Ali (then Clay) to boxing at Columbia Gym was serendipitous and has become a key part of Ali lore. He stopped by the building for a Louisville Service Club event that was occurring upstairs and offered free snacks. He parked his red Schwinn bicycle out front while he went inside, and when he came back out, it had been stolen. An irate Clay was told out to report the theft to a local police officer named Joe Martin, who was on site because he also happened to run the Columbia Gym and train young boxers. Clay informed Martin that his bike had been stolen and said he planned to beat up the thief. Martin replied to Clay that if he wanted to do that, he better learn to fight first, leading him to try boxing.

In honor of Ali and Martin's encounter, a replica red bike now hangs over the front entrance of Columbia Gym.

In 1963 Spalding University purchased the former Columbia Auditorium for use in administrative, recreational, athletic, religious, and cultural events, including public lectures by notable public figures. The auditorium seats about 700 people in its main floor and balcony.

The building was designed by Louisville architect Thomas J. Nolan in 1925 in a classic style in accordance with Vignola. The external walls are of Bedford limestone with buff brick trim. Interior floors and staircases are marble. The Knights of Columbus commissioned the building to serve as a center for their many activities.

After the economic depression of 1929, the Knights of Columbus could not maintain it, so it was used by other groups. During World War II it was a service club for military personnel. It was also used by the Louisville Orchestra in that group's early days. Perhaps the best-known use of the gymnasium in the building was the housing of Golden Gloves Boxing events during the 1950s. It was there that Cassius Clay (later Muhammad Ali) trained as a teenager.

== Rankings ==
In 2024, Spalding College was ranked #64 (tie) in the Regional Universities South category by U.S. News & World Report.

== Athletics ==
Spalding athletics logo

The Spalding athletic teams are called the Golden Eagles. The university is a member of the Division III ranks of the National Collegiate Athletic Association (NCAA), primarily competing in the St. Louis Intercollegiate Athletic Conference (SLIAC) as a provisional member since the 2009–10 academic year (achieving D-III full member status in 2012–13). The Golden Eagles previously competed as an NCAA D-III Independent from 2007–08 to 2008–09; and in the Kentucky Intercollegiate Athletic Conference (KIAC; now known as the River States Conference (RSC) since 2016–17) of the National Association of Intercollegiate Athletics (NAIA) from 1992–93 to 2006–07.

Spalding competes in 15 intercollegiate varsity sports. Men's sports include baseball, basketball, cross country, golf, lacrosse, soccer and track & field; women's sports include basketball, cross country, golf, lacrosse, soccer, softball, track & field and volleyball. Men's volleyball will be added in the 2026 season (2025–26 school year) and will compete in the single-sport Midwest Collegiate Volleyball League.

About 30 percent of Spalding's undergraduate students participate in varsity sports. Spalding's athletic director is Brian Clinard.

=== Mascot and nickname ===
In 2006, Spalding changed the name of its athletic nickname from Pelicans to Golden Eagles via a selection committee that included student input. The Golden Eagle was picked because it embodies strength, courage and strong vision. The image of the Pelican, which embodies peace, justice, service and spiritual values, remains on the university's official seal. In 2018, Spalding unveiled its first official Golden Eagle mascot, a blue-and-gold bird named Ollie, as selected by a campus-wide vote.

== Notable alumni ==
- Elmer Lucille Allen, ceramic artist and chemist
- Tony Bennett, Florida Commissioner of Education (2013–2014)
- Beverly Chester-Burton (born 1963), politician
- Foust, artist, writer, and cartoonist
- Holly Gleason, music critic, songwriter, and music industry consultant
- Joey Goebel, fiction author
- Robert X. Golphin, actor and filmmaker
- Richard Goodman, nonfiction writer
- Sister Rose Agnes Greenwell, botanist.
- Ed Hamilton, sculptor of public works and honored in 2020 as Louisvillian of the Year
- Mary C. Harper, educator and member of the Kentucky House of Representatives (2002–2006)
- Vilma G. Holland, Puerto Rican visual artist
- Silas House, novelist
- Katrina Kittle, novelist
- Tori Murden McClure, first woman and the first American to row solo across the Atlantic Ocean and president of Spalding University (2010–2024)
- Richard Newman, poet and author
- David Allen Patterson, professor, researcher, author, and Native American advocate
- Mary Pendleton, diplomat and the first American Ambassador to Moldova (1992–1995)
- Lois Ann Pfiester, phycologist and protistologist
- Diana Raab, author, poet, and lecturer
- Bride Neill Taylor, writer, educator, and civic leader
- Frank X Walker, poet and first African American Poet Laureate of Kentucky
- Julia Watts, fiction writer
- Jim Wayne, member of the Kentucky House of Representatives (1990–2019)
- Crystal Wilkinson, author, professor, and Poet Laureate of Kentucky

== See also ==
- Bellarmine University
- Religion in Louisville, Kentucky
