= Mark Powell (novelist) =

American novelist (born 1976)

- Born: 1976 (age 49–50)
- Occupation: Novelist
- Website: www.markpowellauthor.com

Mark Powell (born 1976) is an American novelist. He is the author of nine novels, most recently The Late Rebellion and Hurricane Season. A highly decorated author, he has received fellowships from the National Endowment for the Arts and the Breadloaf Writers' Conference, as well as two Fulbright Fellowships. Educated at The Citadel, The University of South Carolina, and Yale Divinity School, Powell teaches in the English Department at Appalachian State University in Boone, North Carolina. He repeatedly serves as the fiction workshop leader for the Hindman Settlement School's Appalachian Writers Workshop and the Mountain Heritage Literary Festival at Lincoln Memorial University. Powell's early work has established him in the southern Appalachian tradition alongside writers such as Pamela Duncan, Silas House and Ron Rash. His recent fiction is more global in scope, in the vein of Robert Stone and Bob Shacochis.

== Novels ==
=== Prodigals ===
Fifteen-year-old Ernest Cobb has fled his South Carolina home after the death of his girlfriend. They both feared she was pregnant and while he's innocent of her murder, he's terrified of facing his father's wrath.

In the late summer of 1944, making his way northward to Asheville through the Blue Ridge Mountains, Ernest meets fellow travelers—drifters, veterans, and outsiders—who are willing to help him. An aging hermit and woodsman, once a glassblower, rescues and revives Ernest after a particularly chilly evening.

Upon his arrival in Asheville, he finds work as a dishwasher, takes shelter in a dreary boardinghouse, and soon becomes involved with a new girlfriend. When their relationship ends, Ernest decides to accompany his friend, June Bug, to the logging camps.

Told in a minimalist style, Prodigals is a novel about Ernest's loss of innocence as well as America's loss of innocence after World War II. Using the American landscape of small towns and logging camps as touchstones, Prodigals focuses on the subculture of transients and the loneliness driving them.

=== Blood Kin ===
Blood Kin received the Peter Taylor Prize for the Novel in 2005, awarded annually by the Knoxville Writer's Guild and the University of Tennessee.

=== The Dark Corner ===
The Dark Corner tells the story of the three Walker brothers, troubled men struggling to hold their lives together in the South Carolina mountains. With its attention to the natural world and exploration of the clash between the old and the new South, The Dark Corner evokes the fiction of James Dickey and Ron Rash.

=== The Sheltering ===
The Sheltering is a literary thriller in the tradition of Robert Stone or Jim Harrison. Set primarily in Florida, it tells the story of drone pilot Luther Redding and his family, who suffer a great tragedy. Meanwhile, burned out brothers Donny and Bobby Rosen light out on a drug-fueled road trip to the American West.

=== Small Treasons ===
Small Treasons is a literary thriller set in North Georgia. It tells the story of John and Tess Maynard, whose marriage is tested when one of John's old CIA colleagues asks him to spy on a professor at his university. The novel explores terrorism, ISIS, and the wreck of 21st century America, and the way old sins never leave us.

=== Firebird ===
Firebird is set during the 2014 Russia-Ukraine conflict. A U.S. arms deal gone south takes the reader into the underground world of political operatives, Ivy League criminals and a hedge fund billionaire with eyes on the presidency.
