= Neela Vaswani =

American writer of Indian extraction

Neela Vaswani is an American writer of Indian heritage.

== Early life ==
She was born in 1974 in Port Jefferson, New York, to Sindhi father and Irish mother, Vaswani received degrees from Skidmore College, Vermont College, and the University of Maryland. She narrated the audio version of I Am Malala by Malala Yousafzai, and won a Grammy for this in 2015. She is married to actor Holter Graham and lives in New York City. She is the founder of the Storylines Project, which she did with the New York Public Library.

== Books ==
- Same Sun Here, co-authored with Silas House
- Where the Long Grass Bends
- This is my Eye
- You Have Given Me a Country

== Reviews about her work ==
Deborah Stevenson, editor of the Bulletin of the Center for Children's Books at Johns Hopkins University Press, wrote: "While a few spreads digress less usefully, albeit playfully, it's that emphasis on varying perspectives that makes this valuable, since kids in all kinds of places will benefit from the prompt to reexamine their surroundings through fresh eyes."

Maryn Wheeler of Brigham Young University wrote: "Vaswani easily captures the intricacy of perspectives in this vivid yet simple picture book. The first-person point of view draws the reader in and challenges them to see what she sees."

Kirkus Reviews wrote: "While readers may be prompted to wonder how a photo series taken by an actual child photographer might have differed, Vaswani’s debut picture book is an elegant and playful look at perspective, photography, and a familiar (to many) cityscape."
