= Amy Greene =

American novelist

- Born: Amy Elizabeth Oler; October 2, 1975 (age 50); Morristown, Tennessee, U.S.
- Education: Vermont College of Fine Arts
- Occupation: Novelist
- Spouse: Trent Thomson (m. 2016)
- Children: 2
- Writing career
- Notable awards: Judy Gaines Young Book Award (2016)

Amy Elizabeth Greene (born October 2, 1975) is an American novelist. Her debut novel, Bloodroot, was a national bestseller. Her second novel, Long Man, was published in March 2014. She is also a contributor to The New York Times among other publications.

== Biography ==
Greene was born Amy Elizabeth Oler in Morristown, Tennessee and grew up in Whitesburg, Tennessee, in the foothills of the Great Smoky Mountains. She received a bachelor's degree from Vermont College in 2008. In 2011 she was awarded the Weatherford Award for Fiction at Berea College. In 2014 her second novel Long Man won the Willie Morris Award for Southern Literature. It was a Washington Post Top Book of 2014 and was named one of the Minneapolis Star Tribune's 10 Favorite Books of 2014.

== Writing ==
Greene's first novel, Bloodroot, was published in 2010. It was a New York Times and national bestseller, garnering praise from such publications as USA Today, The New York Times, The Boston Globe and The Atlanta Journal-Constitution. Bloodroot received an "A" from Entertainment Weekly and appeared on their "Must List". It received a starred review in Booklist and Kirkus Reviews, was recognized on Amazon's Best Debut Fiction list and was one of Amazon's Best Books of 2010. Bloodroot was a New York Times Editor's Choice and made the Indie Next List before its debut. Greene won the Weatherford Award in 2010 and was named 2010 Tennessee Writer of the Year. Bloodroot has been published in Italy and Turkey. According to WorldCat, the book is held in 1292 libraries.

Greene's second novel, Long Man, was published in March 2014 and as of July 2014 is in 710 libraries according to WorldCat. Long Man was a Washington Post Best Book of the Year. It won the Willie Morris Award for Southern Fiction and was the 2016 recipient of Transylvania University's Judy Gaines Young Book Award, given annually to outstanding fiction from the Appalachian region.

== Personal life ==
Greene married Trent Thomson in 2016. She has two children.

== Works ==
- 2010, Bloodroot - Novel, published by Alfred A. Knopf
- 2014, Long Man - Novel, published by Alfred A. Knopf
