= Mary Ann Taylor-Hall =

American fiction writer and poet

- Born: 1937 (age 88–89); Chicago, Illinois, U.S.
- Education: University of Florida (BA); Columbia University (MA)
- Occupations: Writer; poet
- Spouse: James Baker Hall
- Writing career
- Genre: Fiction

Mary Ann Taylor-Hall (born 1937) is an American fiction writer and poet. She is the author of two novels, a book of short fiction, three collections of poetry, and has published widely in literary journals. She has lived on a farm in Kentucky for many years and was married to poet James Baker Hall.

== Biography ==
Mary Ann Taylor-Hall was born in Chicago, Illinois, in 1937. Her family moved to Winter Haven, Florida, when she was seven and she received her early education there. She attended Wesleyan College, in Macon, Georgia, and graduated with a BA in English from the University of Florida. She received her MA in English literature from Columbia University. Afterwards, she taught at Auburn University, the University of Kentucky, the University of Puerto Rico, and Miami University of Ohio. She was married to writer James Baker Hall, who died in 2009. She has lived on a farm on the Harrison-Scott County line in Central Kentucky for the past forty years.

== Writing ==
Taylor-Hall's most recent book of poetry, Out of Nowhere: New and Selected Poems, was published in December 2017 by Old Cove Press and is distributed by Small Press Distribution. Two previous collections of poetry, Dividing Ridge (Larkspur Press, 2008) and Joy Dogs (Press on Scroll Road, 2013). were published in handset letterpress limited editions. Her first novel Come and Go, Molly Snow (University Press of Kentucky, 2009) (W.W. Norton & Company, 1995) was a Barnes & Noble Discover Great New Writers selection. Her second novel At The Breakers was published in 2009 by the University Press of Kentucky. Her collection of short fiction, How She Knows What She Knows about Yo-Yos, (Sarabande Books, 2000) was a Foreword Magazine Book of the Year. Her work has been published in The Paris Review, The Kenyon Review, The Sewanee Review, Ploughshares, Shenandoah and other literary quarterlies, and has been anthologized in The Best American Short Stories and in the book Home and Beyond: An Anthology of Kentucky Short Stories, edited by Morris A. Grubbs (University Press of Kentucky, 2001). She is the recipient of a PEN/Syndicated Fiction Award and has received grants from the National Endowment for the Arts and the Kentucky Arts Council.

== Publications ==
=== Fiction ===
- At The Breakers (University Press of Kentucky, 2009) ISBN 978-0-8131-2542-8
- How She Knows What She Knows about Yo-Yos (Sarabande Books, 2000) ISBN 978-1-889330-36-5
- Come and Go, Molly Snow (W.W. Norton & Company, 1995) (University Press of Kentucky, 2009) ISBN 978-0-393-03735-7

=== Poetry ===
- Out of Nowhere: New and Selected Poems (Old Cove Press, 2017) () ISBN 978-0-9675424-6-1
- Joy Dogs (Press on Scroll Road, 2013)
- Dividing Ridge (Larkspur Press, 2008)

=== Nonfiction ===
- Missing Mountains (Wind Publications, 2005) with Bobbie Ann Mason and Kristin Johannsen ISBN 978-1893239494
