= Katrina Kittle =

American writer

- Education: Ohio University; Spalding University (MFA)
- Occupation: Novelist
- Website: www.katrinakittle.com

Katrina Kittle is an American novelist from Dayton, Ohio. Her third book, The Kindness of Strangers, won the 2006 Great Lakes Book Award for Fiction.

== Education ==
Kittle is an alumnus of Ohio University, where she earned degrees in English and Education, and Spalding University, where she earned an MFA.

== Career ==
Kittle was a middle school teacher at The Miami Valley School, and an English teacher at Centerville High School. From 2013 to 2014, she was employed as a Program Assistant at the Miami Valley Fair Housing Center, but as of June 2015 she was no longer listed on their Staff webpage.

Kittle is represented by Lisa Bankoff of International Creative Management. Her current publisher is HarperCollins. Kittle has appeared at the Antioch Writers' Workshop in Yellow Springs, Ohio, an annual week-long writing workshop.

== Bibliography ==
- Traveling Light (Warner Books, 2000), ISBN 978-0446524803
- Two Truths and a Lie (Grand Central Publishing, 2001), ISBN 978-0446524872
- The Kindness of Strangers (William Morrow, 2006), ISBN 978-0060564742
- The Blessings of the Animals (William Morrow, 2010), ISBN 978-0061906077
- Reasons to Be Happy (Sourcebooks Young Readers, 2011), ISBN 978-1402260209
- Morning in This Broken World (Lake Union Publishing, 2023), ISBN 978-1662510113
