= James Baker Hall =

American poet (1935–2009)

James Baker Hall (April 14, 1935 – June 25, 2009) was an American poet, novelist, photographer and teacher.

== Biography ==
James Baker Hall was born in Lexington, Kentucky, in 1935. He was raised in a southern family of means and social standing, only to have a family scandal turn tragic when he was eight years old. This trauma, and its enduring consequence, would shape Hall's life work as an artist, which began when he took up photography at age eleven.

Hall graduated from the University of Kentucky with a B.A. in English, having studied writing under Robert Hazel among his lifelong literary colleagues: Wendell Berry, Ed McClanahan, Gurney Norman, and Bobbie Ann Mason. In 1960, he received a Stegner Fellowship at Stanford University and shared the historic workshops in which Leaving Cheyenne (Larry McMurtry) and One Flew Over the Cookoo's Nest (Ken Kesey) were being written. After his first novel, Yates Paul, His Grand Flights, His Tootings (also written in these same workshops) was published to critical acclaim, Hall returned to his roots in photography. During this time, he became the close colleague of such photographers as Minor White, Richard Benson, and Ralph Eugene Meatyard, was a contributing editor for Aperture, and lectured widely on photography in such places as the Massachusetts Institute of Technology, Rhode Island School of Design, the Visual Studies Workshop, and the Minneapolis Institute of Arts.

In 1973, Hall came back to Lexington to teach at the University of Kentucky and, for the next thirty years, would act as director of the creative writing program. In 2003, he retired as professor emeritus, having vastly influenced the next generation of Kentucky writers. Notable students include: Maurice Manning, T. Crunk, Patrick O'Keeffe, Rebecca Gayle Howell.

Hall was prolific as both a writer and a visual artist, publishing widely in both arenas. In 2001, Hall was named the Poet Laureate of the Commonwealth of Kentucky. He was married to novelist and poet Mary Ann Taylor-Hall. He died on June 25, 2009, in his home outside Sadieville, Kentucky.

== Publications ==
=== Writing ===
- The Missing Body of the Fox, Old Cove Press, 2022
- Pleasure, Scroll Press, 2007
- The Total Light Process: New and Selected Poems, University Press of Kentucky, 2004
- Praeder's Letters, Sarabande Books, 2002
- The Mother on the Other Side of the World, Sarabande Books, 1999
- Fast Signing Mute, Larkspur Press, 1992
- Stopping on the Edge to Wave, Wesleyan University Press, 1988
- Her Name, Pentagram Press, 1982
- Music for a Broken Piano, Fiction Collective, 1982
- Getting it On Up to the Brag, Larkspur Press, 1975
- Yates Paul, His Grand Flights, His Tootings, World Publishing Co., 1963; Cassell & Co., 1964; University Press of Kentucky, 2002.

=== Photography ===
- The Missing Body of the Fox, Old Cover Press, 2022
- Pleasure, Scroll Press, 2007
- Tobacco Harvest: An Elegy, University Press of Kentucky, 2004
- A Spring-Fed Pond, Crystal Publications, 2000
- Orphan in the Attic, University of Kentucky Art Museum, 1995
- Minor White: Rites and Passages, Aperture, 1978
- Ralph Eugene Meatyard, Aperture, 1974

=== Selected articles ===
- "Robert," Southern Quarterly. Vol. 40, No. 3. Spring 2002
- "Merwin," Field. No. 55. Fall 1996
- "Burk Uzzle: The Hustle Comes of Age," Aperture. No. 77. 1976
- "The Strange New World of Ralph Eugene Meatyard", Popular Photography, July 1975
- "The Last Happy Band of Brothers," Esquire. April 1974
- "In My Shoes, Place. Vol. II, No. 2. December, 1972

=== Selected anthologies ===
- Home Ground: Southern Autobiography, edited by J. Bill Berry. University of Missouri Press. 1991
- The Pushcart Prize, VIII: Best of the Small Presses, edited by Bill Henderson. The Pushcart Press. 1983-1984
- Traveling America with Today's Poets, edited by David Kherdian. Macmillan Publishing Co., Inc: New York. 1977
- 50 Contemporary Poets: The Creative Process, edited by Alberta T. Turner. David McKay Company, Inc. 1977
- Kentucky Renaissance: An Anthology of Contemporary Writing, edited by Jonathon Greene. Gnomon Press: Kentucky. 1976
- Prize Stories 1968 The O. Henry Awards, edited by William Abrahams. Doubleday & Co., Inc.: New York. 1968
- Stanford Short Stories. 1962, edited by Wallace Stegner and Richard Scowcroft. Stanford University Press: California. 1962

== Selected solo exhibits ==
- Photographs of Wendell Berry by James Baker Hall, Actors Theatre Gallery, Louisville, KY. 2009.
- Photo/Synthesis, 21c Museum, Louisville, KY. 2008-2009.
- 4 Over 50, Gallerie Soleil, Lexington, KY. 2007.
- Appear to Disappear, City Gallery, Downtown Arts Center, Lexington, KY. 2006.
- Tobacco Harvest: An Elegy, Smith Berry Winery Art Gallery, New Castle, KY. 2004.
- Portraits of Kentucky Writers, Ann Tower Gallery, Lexington, KY. 2002.

== Filmography ==
- Firesticks, Premiere: Collective for Living Cinema, NYC. 1985.

== About Hall's work ==
- "He makes our terror come alive – and our knowledge and our joy – in his beautiful singing." --Gerald Stern
- "James Baker Hall has consistently pursued in his poetry a trajectory that is deeply authentic. It has produced writing of daring and delicacy, over a period long enough to make it plain that this is not a momentary brilliance but a sustained vision. He has been dedicated to making the language reflect the surprise, the turns and leaps of memory and recurrent apparition, in which pain and beauty are often indistinguishable. This new collection [The Mother on the Other Side of the World] displays an intimate authority and mystery of tone that are the fulfillment of a genuine gift and uncompromising devotion to it." --W.S. Merwin
- "The poems are pure, untainted by irony, naked and delighted with being. If there is one unyielding source and destination in all these poems, it is love – people and things worth loving, and the quiet mantra that's always making itself matter. Though you might find yourself laughing or wincing, you understand that above all, James Baker Hall is a serious poet. He means what he says…. Hall is the real deal, the real, beautiful deal." -- Maurice Manning

== Selected awards ==
- 2001 - Poet Laureate of Kentucky
- 1993 - Southern Arts Council Fellowship
- 1986 - Al Smith Fellowship
- 1986 - Honorable Mention, San Francisco Art Institute Film Festival
- 1983 - Pushcart Prize
- 1980 - National Endowment for the Arts Fellowship
- 1973 - Juror's Prize: Photovision (Boston)
- 1967 - O. Henry Prize
- 1960 - Stegner Fellowship
