= Dimestore: A Writer's Life =

Book by Lee Smith

- First edition
- Author: Lee Smith
- Genre: Autobiography
- Publisher: Algonquin Books

Dimestore: A Writer's Life is a memoir by Lee Smith about her childhood in Grundy, Virginia. It was the first book written by Smith that was not fiction.

== Reception ==
Terri Schlichenmeyer of The Pantagraph wrote that it is "a pretty darn good book" and has appeal to multiple audiences.

Publishers Weekly wrote that Smith had "candid observations".

Kirkus Reviews stated it is "A warm, poignant memoir from a reliably smooth voice."
