= Fair and Tender Ladies =

1988 novel by Lee Smith

- First edition
- Author: Lee Smith
- Language: English
- Genre: Historical novel
- Publisher: G.P. Putnam & Son
- Publication date: 1988
- Publication place: United States
- Media type: Print (Hardback and Paperback)
- ISBN: 0-399-13382-8
- OCLC: 18315757
- Dewey Decimal: 813/.54 19
- LC Class: PS3569.M5376 F28 1988
- Preceded by: Family Linen
- Followed by: Me and My Baby View the Eclipse

Fair and Tender Ladies is a novel by Lee Smith published in 1988. It won the W.D. Weatherford Award that year. Fair and Tender Ladies is an epistolary novel consisting entirely of letters written by its protagonist, Ivy Rowe, to numerous recipients from her childhood until her old age. It is set mostly in the Blue Ridge Mountains and covers events from shortly before World War I until the Vietnam era. The novel garnered much critical acclaim and has been adapted for the stage, including a musical version for the Alabama Shakespeare Festival.
