= Poet Laureate of Kentucky =

Poet Laureate of Kentucky is a title awarded to a Kentucky poet by the state's Art Council. In 2013, the position was occupied by Frank X Walker, the first African-American to be so honored.

The poet laureate position was established 1926 by an act of the Kentucky General Assembly. James T. Cotton Noe was the first laureate. Originally appointed to lifetime terms, following 1990 legislation laureates have been appointed by the governor to two-year terms.

== List of poets laureate ==
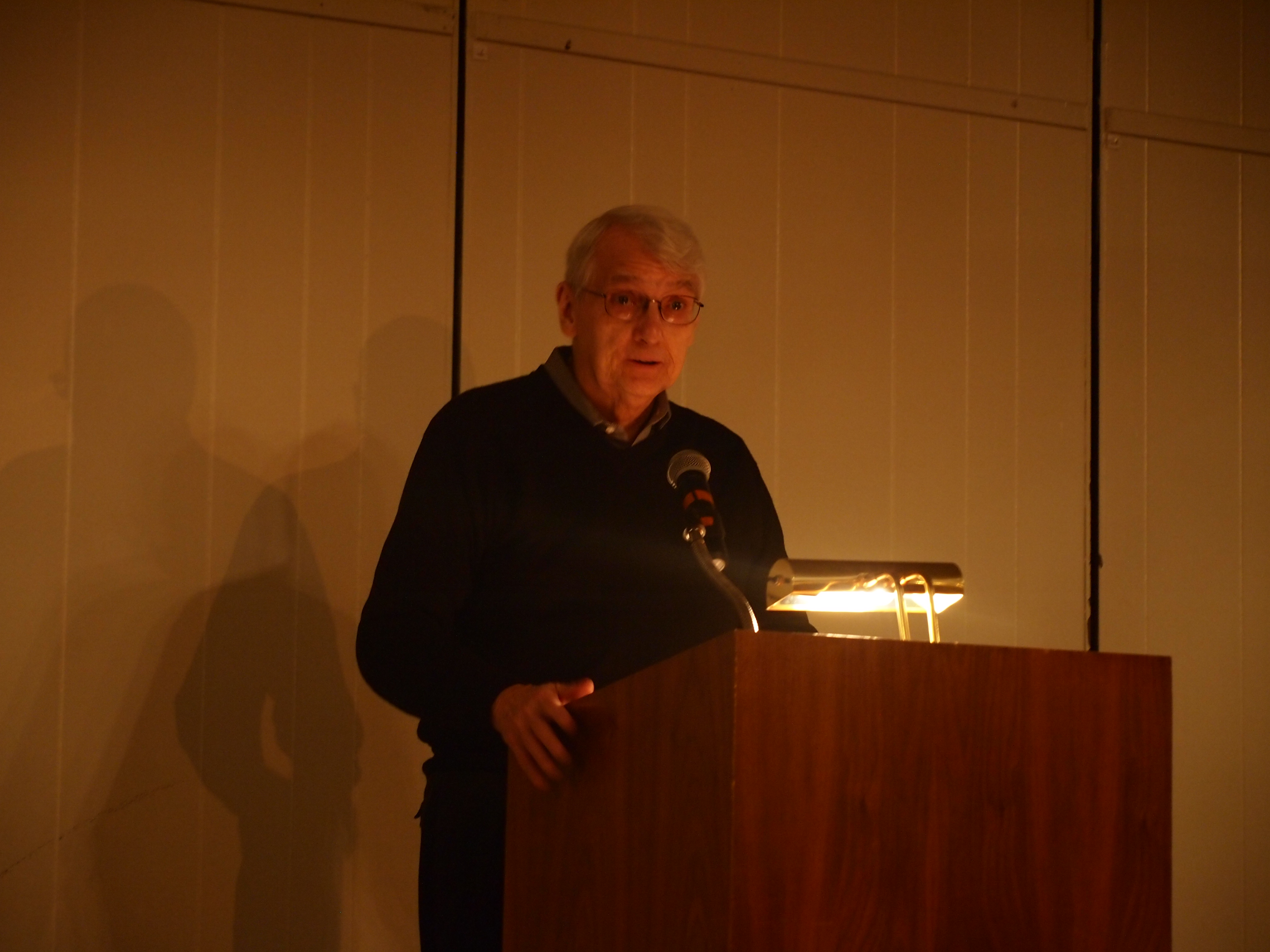
Gurney Norman was poet laureate in 2009.

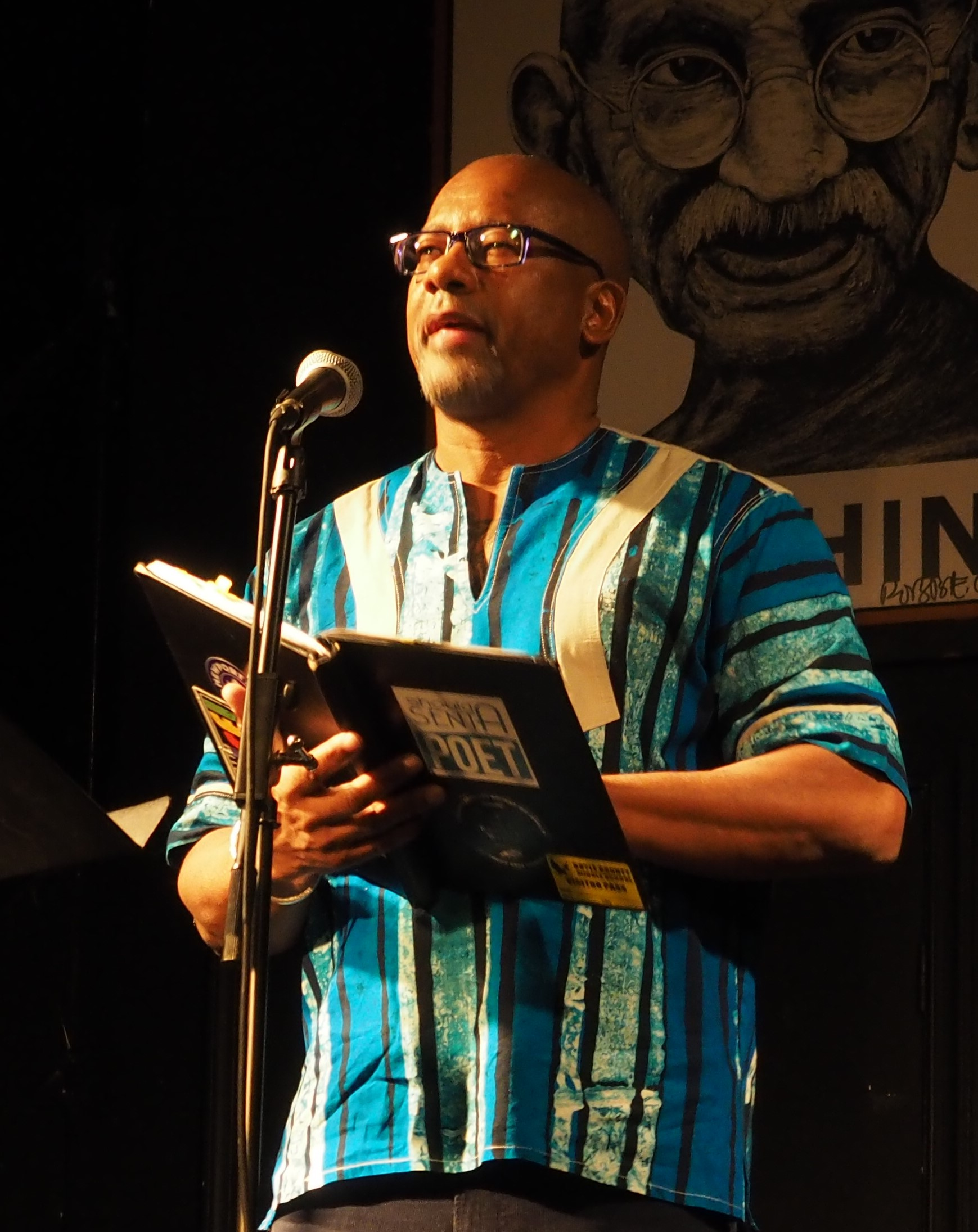
Frank X Walker was poet laureate in 2013.

Poets laureate of Kentucky include:

#	Poet laureate	Term began	Term ended	Appointed by	Notes
1	James Thomas "Cotton" Noe	March 1926	9 November 1953 (death)	legislature	
2	Edward G. Hill	1 October 1928	8 November 1937 (death)	legislature	
3	Louise Scott Phillips	1945	1983 (death)	legislature	
4	Edwin Carlisle Litsey	1954	3 February 1970 (death)	legislature	
5	Jesse Hilton Stuart	1954	1984 (death)	legislature	
6	Lowell Allen Williams	1956	–	legislature	
7	Lillie D. Chaffin	1974	–	legislature	
8	Tom Mobley	1976	–	legislature	
9	Agnes O'Rear	7 March 1978	1990 (death)	legislature	
10	Clarence "Soc" Clay	1984	–	legislature	
11	Lee Pennington	1984	–	legislature	
12	Paul Salyers	1984	–	legislature	
13	Dale Faughn	1986	–	legislature	
14	Jim Wayne Miller	1986	–	legislature	
15	Henry E. Pilkenton	1986	–	legislature	
16	James H. Patton Jr.	1990	–	legislature	
17	James Still	1995	1996	–	
18	Joy Bale Boone	1997	1998	–	
19	Richard Taylor	1999	2000	–	
20	James Baker Hall	2001	2002	–	
21	Joe Survant	2003	2004	–	
22	Sena Jeter Naslund	2005	2006	–	
23	Jane Gentry Vance	2007	2008	–	
24	Gurney Norman	2009	2010	–	
25	Maureen Morehead	2011	2012	–	
26	Frank X Walker	January 2013	2014	–	
27	George Ella Lyon	2015	2016	–	
28	Frederick Smock	May 1, 2017	2018		
29	Jeff Worley	2019	2020	Matt Bevin	
30	Crystal Wilkinson	2021	2022		
31	Silas House	2023	2024	Andy Beshear	
32	Kathleen Driskell	2025	2026	Andy Beshear	
