= Holly Goddard Jones =

American novelist and short story author

Holly Goddard Jones is an American novelist, educator, and short story author.

== Early life ==
Jones was born and raised in Russellville, Kentucky, a setting which influenced her books Girl Trouble and The Next Time You See Me, both of which are set in the fictional rural Kentucky town of Roma.

== Education ==
Upon graduating high school, Jones attended Western Kentucky University to study journalism. However, Jones ended up transferring to the University of Kentucky after a year to study English, later graduating with Bachelor of Arts. Following her graduation from the University of Kentucky, Jones received a Master of Fine Arts from Ohio State University.

== Writing ==
=== Books ===
In 2009, Jones released her first book, Girl Trouble, a series of short stories, many of which were featured in various publications including New Stories from the South (2007 and 2008) and in Best American Mystery Stories 2008.

Her second book, The Next Time You See Me was released in 2013 to critical praise from such major media outlets as New York Times, USA Today, and the Chicago Tribune, among others. It was also the winner of Transylvania University's Judy Gaines Young Book Award.

The Salt Line, Jones' second novel, was released in September 2017. Publishers Weekly, in a positive review, described the book as "seamless" and "thrilling." The novel also received praise from the Los Angeles Times and the Pittsburgh Post-Gazette.

=== Other media ===
Jones has been featured as a guest columnist for Slate's TV Club writing on the Kentucky-based television series Justified.

== Teaching ==
Jones currently teaches English at the University of North Carolina Greensboro.

== Awards ==
- Hillsdale Award for Fiction (2013)
- Rona Jaffe Foundation Writers' Award (2007)

== Bibliography ==
- Girl Trouble (2009, HarperCollins)
- The Next Time You See Me (2013, Touchstone Books)
- The Salt Line (2017, G.P. Putnam's Sons)
- Antipodes: Stories (2022, University of Iowa Press)
