= Gray Zeitz =

American publisher (born 1949)

- Born: Mobile, Alabama
- Occupation: Publisher
- Known for: Larkspur Press

Gray Zeitz (born 1949 or 1950) is an American publisher, known for founding the Larkspur Press.

His interest in printing started while he was studying at the University of Kentucky, and in 2013 the university held an event to celebrate his 40 years of work with the Larkspur Press.

In 2002 he won the Artist Award of the Kentucky Governor's Awards in the Arts.

== Early life ==
Zeitz was born in Mobile, Alabama and raised in Elizabethtown, Kentucky. He has two children and five grandchildren.
