= Vilma G. Holland =

Puerto Rican visual artist (1928–2005)

Vilma G, Holland
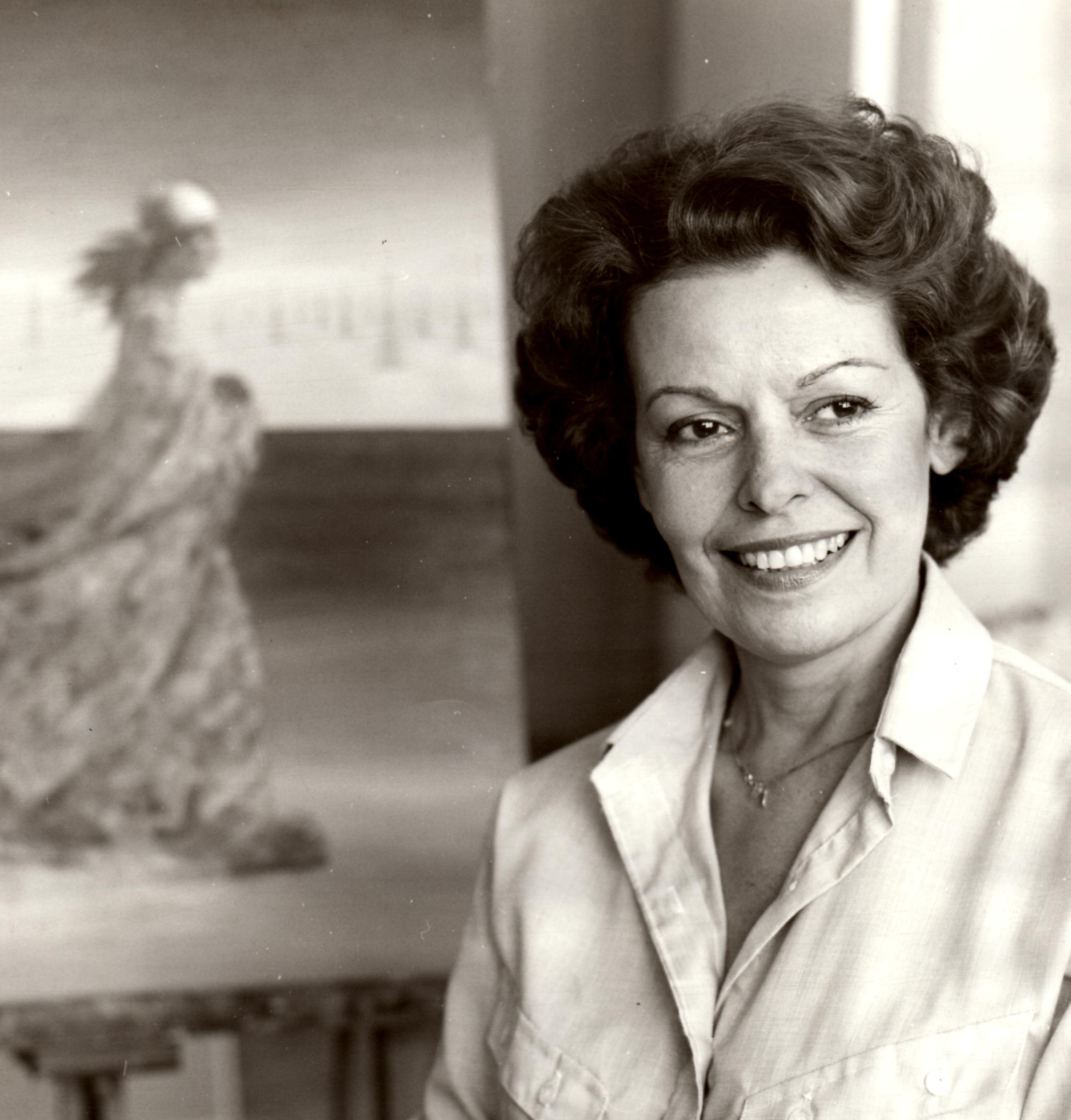
- Holland at an exhibition at Galeria Aurora
- Born: Vilma Isabel Gonzalez Cordova; November 5, 1928; Caguas, Puerto Rico
- Died: January 26, 2005 (aged 76); Conyers, Georgia
- Known for: visual artist

Vilma Isabel Gonzalez Cordova Holland (November 5, 1928 - January 26, 2005) was a Puerto Rican visual artist.

== Early years ==
Holland (birth name: Vilma Isabel Gonzalez Cordova) was born in Caguas, Puerto Rico. She was the fourth youngest of ten children in the large Gonzalez Cordova family. Her father, Jose, was a merchant while her mother, Rosa Candida, stayed at home raising the children. The first floor of their large, two-story concrete home was the family business and the second floor was the living quarters. Jose sold groceries and provisions downstairs while his wife reared the children upstairs in their seven-bedroom home. Holland's artistic talents were discovered very early in life. A favorite family story is that as a child Holland was asked by a teacher to draw pictures of two famous Spanish poets. Upon completion, the teacher refused to believe that Holland had done the pen and ink portraits without using graph paper or tracing. Accused of lying, she was sent home. Señora Gonzalez Cordova returned to the school with Holland and they documented her exceptional talent.

== Education ==
Holland attended high school in her hometown of Caguas. Her teacher, Victor Torres Lizardi, a painter from Caguas, taught her pen and ink along with watercolors. After some spirited family discussions, Holland followed her artistic interests majoring in art at Nazareth Junior College in Bardstown, Kentucky (currently Spalding University). She received her diploma on June 3, 1948. Upon graduation, Holland returned home and enrolled at the University of Puerto Rico, UPR. One of her art teachers was Professor Guillermo Sureda. He took an interest in her and continued her education with watercolors. Sureda was from Spain and his wife, like Holland, was from Puerto Rico. Professor Fran Cervoni, another art teacher, taught design to her. Professor Cristobol Ruiz introduced Holland to oils. Holland graduated with a bachelor's degree in art on May 27, 1949. The UPR recognized her design abilities and Cervoni helped Holland obtain a fellowship to the Fashion Institute of Technology in New York City where she studied under various artists, including Arnold Burchess. Holland received an Associate in Applied Science from FIT on June 11, 1964. During this time she divorced her first husband, Emigdio Buonomo.

After college, Holland taught art at the University of Puerto Rico. She also worked in the corporate world where she specialized in corporate identity and product design. At this time, she and Senora Teresita Abella founded the Thomas Alva Edison School Caguas, Puerto Rico, a private school with an initial enrollment of five students. The school continued to grow, and currently serves over 600 pupils. For this and other contributions to her home island, Holland was honored as one of the “Grandes Mujeres De Puerto Rico” (Grand Ladies of Puerto Rico).

== Venezuela ==
In the late 1960s, Holland and her mother rented a loft apartment in Rio Piedras, Puerto Rico. Shortly after moving in, Holland met her future husband, PJ Holland. They were married about one year later and moved to Caracas, Venezuela. Holland turned all of her attention to painting and drawing. In April 1973, Holland was commissioned to create a pen and ink drawing of Blanca Rodriguez, the Primera Dama de Venezuela (“The First Lady of Venezuela”), which was published on the cover of Mujer Magazine. When exhibition and framing costs increased, Holland started a company, Artes Vilma, to market her pen and ink greeting card designs. The cards became very popular. In 1975 the Canis Club de Venezuela (The Dog Club of Venezuela), an associate club of the Federacion Canina de Venezuela, asked her to design a poster to be used for their annual dog show.

=== Politics and art ===
Meanwhile, Holland continued to paint and exhibit. She steadily built a reputation in the Venezuelan art community. Her work was usually developed around a theme and very often touched upon controversial subjects. Her personal crusade became addressing the plight of the indigenous Guajiro Indians living on Lake Maracaibo. Along the Guajira Peninsula, Holland observed and painted pictures of less fortunate villagers who lived in Palafitos that the people had built over the water. Many of Holland's paintings depicted the poverty of the Guajiro Indians, contrasted with the oil richness of their land. The works were critical successes and led to raising social awareness of the inequality. Several of these paintings were exhibited on November 30, 1975.

== Influence of Arana ==
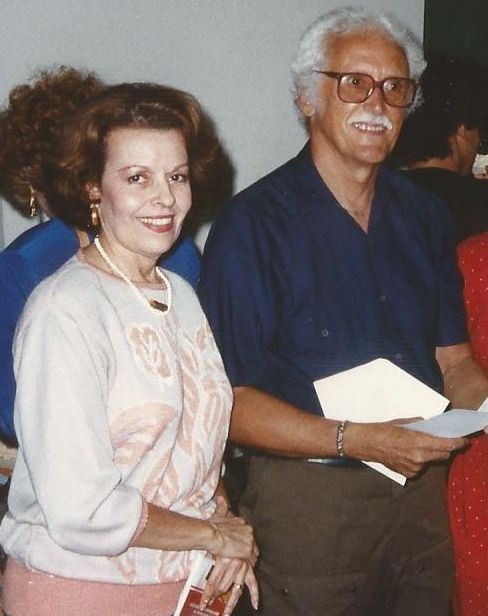
This picture was taken around 1977 at a party in Old San Juan, Puerto Rico. Holland and Arana were good friends.

In late 1976/early 1977, her husband was transferred to Puerto Rico, so Holland continued her career of painting and expanding her artistic vision. During this time, Holland met artist Alfonso Arana and began studying at his studio in Old San Juan, Puerto Rico. Under his influence, she began to experiment in Arana's style with pastels mixed with oils and “transparency in art.” The two became close friends and Arana once said of Holland, “…see a true artist at work.”

== Final years ==
In early 1990s her husband retired and within a few years the couple moved to the United States. They bought a home in Conyers, Georgia. Holland was not as active in the arts community as she had once been. Her memory was beginning to fail. She had given up painting relying only on pen & ink for her artistic release. Her husband continued to be active in the local arts community. A few artists reviewed some of Holland's paintings and they encouraged him to exhibit her work. The local newspaper published an article devoted to Holland's art. By this time, her overall health had shown increasing signs of marked deterioration, and a diagnosis of Alzheimer's disease was made. After six years of home care and two years of nursing home care, Vilma G. Holland died on January 26, 2005.

== See also ==
- List of Puerto Ricans
