= Hal Crowther =

American journalist and essayist

- Born: 1945 (age 80–81)
- Education: Williams College; Columbia University Graduate School of Journalism
- Occupations: American journalist and essayist
- Spouse: Lee Smith

Hal Crowther (born 1945) is an American journalist and essayist.

== Biography ==
His essays have been published in many anthologies, including Novello: Ten Years of Great American Writing (2000). "Dealer's Choice," Crowther's column on southern letters and culture, has been featured in The Oxford American since 1994.

He was executive editor for the Spectator in Raleigh, North Carolina from 1984 until 1989, and he has also been the film and drama critic for the Buffalo News, media critic for Newsweek, and writer for Time magazine. Additionally, Crowther has written for The Humanist and Free Inquiry magazines. He has also been a regular contributor to the book pages of The Atlanta Journal-Constitution.

== Education ==
He is a graduate of Williams College, where he was sports editor of the Williams Record, and the Columbia University Graduate School of Journalism.

== Family ==
He lives in Hillsborough, North Carolina with his wife, novelist Lee Smith.

== Awards ==
In 1992 his syndicated column received the Baltimore Sun's H. L. Mencken Writing Award and in 1998 it won the American Association of Newsweeklies first prize for commentary, shared with Nat Hentoff of the Village Voice. His book Cathedrals of Kudzu: A Personal Landscape of the South won the Lillian Smith Book Award, the 1999-2001 Fellowship Prize for Non-Fiction from the Fellowship of Southern Writers. In 2000, he received the Russell J. Jandoli Award for Excellence in Journalism from St. Bonaventure University. Crowther's poem "Christian Soldiers" was selected for the 2019 Pushcart Prize series.

== Works ==
- An Infuriating American: The Incendiary Arts of H. L. Mencken (2014) ISBN 1-6093-8281-1
- Gather at the River: Notes From the Post Millennial South (2005) ISBN 0-8071-3100-8
- Cathedrals of Kudzu: A Personal Landscape of the South (2002) ISBN 0-8071-2594-6
- Unarmed but Dangerous: A Withering Attack on All Things Phony, Foolish, and Fundamentally Wrong With America Today (1995) ISBN 1-56352-193-8
