= Alcoholism Treatment Quarterly =

- Discipline: Alcoholism
- Language: English

Publication details
- History: 1984-present
- Publisher: Taylor and Francis
- Frequency: Quarterly

Standard abbreviations
- ISO 4: Alcohol. Treat. Q.

Indexing
- ISSN: 0734-7324 (print); 1544-4538 (web)
- LCCN: sf93094984
- OCLC no.: 8794863

Links
- Journal homepage; Online access; Online archive

The Alcoholism Treatment Quarterly is a quarterly peer-reviewed medical journal published by Taylor & Francis. The co-editors-in-chief are Regina Baronia, MD and Zach Sneed, PhD (Texas Tech University Health Sciences Center). The journal was first published in 1984 by Haworth Press. It covers all aspects of alcohol addiction and its treatment.

== Abstracting and indexing ==
The journal is abstracted and indexed in:

- CINAHL Full Text
- EBSCOhost
- ProQuest databases
- PsycINFO
- Scopus
- SocINDEX
