= Flash Me Magazine =

Online magazine

- Editor-in-Chief: Jennifer Dawson
- Categories: Fiction, Flash fiction
- Frequency: Quarterly
- Publisher: Winged Halo Productions
- First issue: July 7, 2003; 22 years ago
- Company: Winged Halo Productions
- Country: United States
- Based in: Belleville, Illinois
- Language: American English
- ISSN: 1559-1123

Flash Me Magazine is a defunct online magazine devoted to publishing flash fiction stories. Its last issue was in October 2010. It was a quarterly publication by Winged Halo Productions. It was a paying market, accepting all genres of fiction under 1,000 words. Issues were published on January 31, April 30, July 31, and October 31. The magazine had its headquarters in Belleville, Illinois.

Throughout its history, Flash Me Magazine supported and promoted the art of flash fiction writing with its Lightning Flash Fiction Contests, its Flash For BIG Cash Anthologies, and its Flash Fiction Boot Camp series. All proceeds raised from these projects helped fund the magazine.

== Authors ==
A complete list of all the authors published in Flash Me Magazine can be found in their archives.

These include:

- Ilona Andrews (published in Flash Me Magazine as Andrew & Ilona Gordon)
- Michael Arnzen
- Bruce Boston
- John Bushore
- Elaine Cunningham
- Bruce Holland Rogers
- Marge Simon
- Steven Utley
