= Maurice Manning (poet) =

American poet (born 1966)

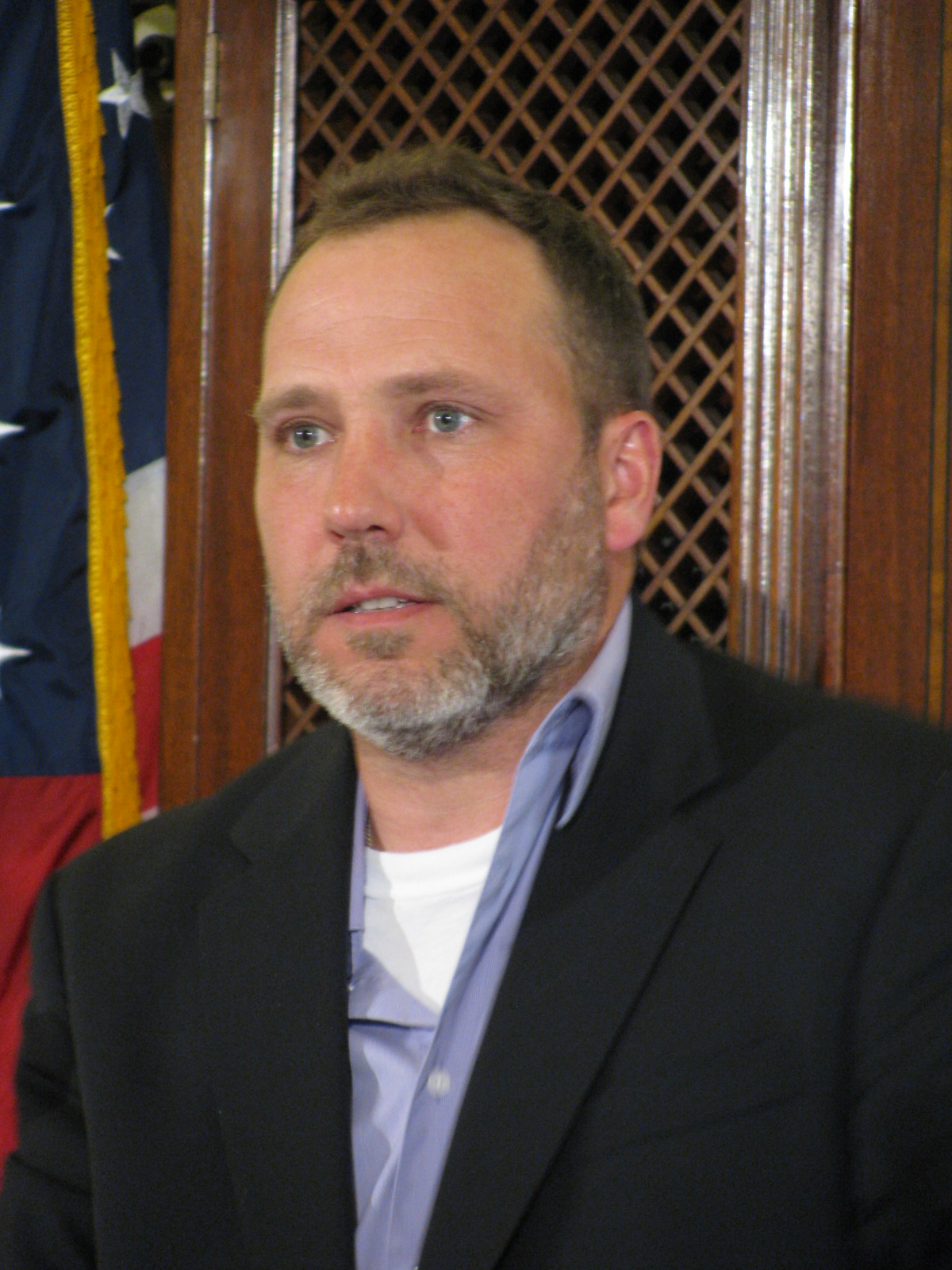
- Born: 1966 (age 59–60); Danville, Kentucky, U.S.
- Education: Earlham College (BA); University of Kentucky (MA); University of Alabama (MFA)
- Occupation: Poet
- Children: 1
- Writing career
- Period: Early 21st Century
- Genre: Poetry
- Notable works: The Common Man, Lawrence Booth's Book of Visions

Maurice Manning (born 1966) is an American poet. His first collection of poems, Lawrence Booth's Book of Visions, was awarded the Yale Younger Poets Award, chosen by W.S. Merwin. Since then he has published four collections of poetry (with Houghton Mifflin Harcourt and Copper Canyon Press). He teaches English and Creative Writing at Transylvania University in Lexington, Kentucky, where he oversees the Judy Gaines Young Book Award, and is a member of the poetry faculty of the Warren Wilson College MFA Program for Writers.

== Life ==
Manning was born in Danville, Kentucky. He attended Earlham College and the University of Alabama at Tuscaloosa. From 2000 to 2004, Manning taught at DePauw University. In the fall of 2004 he began teaching in the Indiana University M.F.A. Program. He is on the faculty of the Warren Wilson College MFA Program for Writers and in January 2012 he was hired by Transylvania University, a small liberal arts college in Lexington, Kentucky. He lives on a 20-acre farm in Washington County, Kentucky.

Manning lists the poets William Wordsworth, Samuel Taylor Coleridge, Robert Frost, Elizabeth Bishop, and Robert Penn Warren among his influences, as well as Wendell Berry and Henry David Thoreau.

Manning appeared in KET's 2018 documentary, Robert Penn Warren: A Vision. Of Warren, he said "Robert Penn Warren had a vision. Not only a creative vision expressed through his fiction and poetry, but a broader vision of our entire country and its complicated history. So for me, there is something remarkable about this man that I find deeply moving, always."

== Publications ==
Manning's first collection, Lawrence Booth's Book of Visions, won the Yale Series of Younger Poets Competition in 2001 (under W. S. Merwin). Dwight Garner, literary critic for The New York Times, said in a review of the book that "Manning displays not just terrific cunning but terrific aim--he nails his images the way a restless boy, up in a tree with a slingshot, nails anything sentient that wanders into view". His fourth collection, The Common Man (Houghton Mifflin, 2010), deals with religion, Kentucky, whiskey, and a donkey, and was praised as a "fine collection" by Jacob Sunderlin in the Sycamore Review. During his Guggenheim fellowship, he worked on his fifth collection, The Gone and the Going Away. His collection, One Man's Dark, was published in 2016 and focuses on rural America, and on living life in close contact with the natural world. In 2020, Manning published Railsplitter, which envisions the role of poetry in the life of Abraham Lincoln.

Manning's poems have appeared in The New Yorker, Time, Shenandoah, The Southern Review, Washington Square, Green Mountains Review, Hayden's Ferry Review, Spoon River Poetry Review, Wind, Hunger Mountain, Black Warrior Review, Virginia Quarterly Review, and elsewhere. His collection The Common Man was one of the two finalists for the 2011 Pulitzer Prize in Poetry. He has held a fellowship to the Fine Arts Works Center in Provincetown and was a 2011 Guggenheim Fellow.

== Bibliography ==
=== Poetry ===
Collections

- Lawrence Booth's Book of Visions. Yale University Press. 2001. ISBN 978-0-300-08998-1.
- A Companion For Owls. Houghton Mifflin Harcourt. 2004. ISBN 978-0-15-101049-3.
- Bucolics. Houghton Mifflin Harcourt. 2007. ISBN 978-0-15-101310-4.
- The Common Man. Houghton Mifflin Harcourt. 2010. ISBN 978-0-547-24961-2.
- The Gone and the Going Away. Houghton Mifflin Harcourt. 2013. ISBN 9780547939957.
- One Man's Dark. Copper Canyon Press. 2016. ISBN 9781556594748.
- Railsplitter. Copper Canyon Press. 2020. ISBN 978-1556595714.
- Snakedoctor. Copper Canyon Press. 2023. ISBN 978-1-55659-698-8.

List of poems

Title	Year	First published	Reprinted/collected
Turner	2021	"Turner". The New Yorker. 97 (1): 42–43. February 15–22, 2021.	
