= Larkspur Press =

The Larkspur Press is a small letter-press publisher based in Monterey, Kentucky, United States, founded and operated by Gray Zeitz. They have published books by Wendell Berry, Bobbie Ann Mason, James Baker Hall, Guy Davenport, Ed McClanahan, and others.
