= Pamela Duncan (novelist) =

American novelist

- Born: Pamela Y. Duncan; September 24, 1961 (age 64); Asheville, North Carolina, U.S.
- Education: University of North Carolina at Chapel Hill; North Carolina State University
- Occupation: Novelist

Pamela Y. Duncan (born September 24, 1961) is an American novelist. Her novels include Moon Women (2001), Plant Life (2003), and The Big Beautiful (2007). Her awards include the Sir Walter Raleigh Prize in 2003, and in 2000 she was chosen as one of the Ten Best Emerging Writers in the South. She won an American Library Association award in 2007. Her work often focuses on the lives of working class Southerners.

Duncan currently teaches creative writing at Western Carolina University.

== Early life and education ==
She was born in Asheville, North Carolina, as the oldest of three children born to Carl Jerome Duncan and Patricia Yvonne Price. As a child, she developed a love of reading. Her father would go to the library when they were throwing away old books and collect boxes of them to bring back to her. She was raised in Black Mountain, North Carolina, and Shelby, North Carolina. After graduating from Crest Senior High School, she enrolled in University of North Carolina at Chapel Hill where she majored in journalism and wrote for The Daily Tar Heel, UNC's student newspaper. During this time, Duncan worked as a babysitter and as a scout leader at Camp Golden Valley in Bostic, North Carolina. She received a bachelor's degree in English from the University of North Carolina at Chapel Hill and master's degree from North Carolina State University.

== Reviews ==
=== Moon Women ===
- "... a mesmerizing tale of family and love, revelation and forgiveness."
- "... delightfully captures the lives of four North Carolina women and their relationships with each other."
