= Frank X Walker =

African-American poet (born 1961)

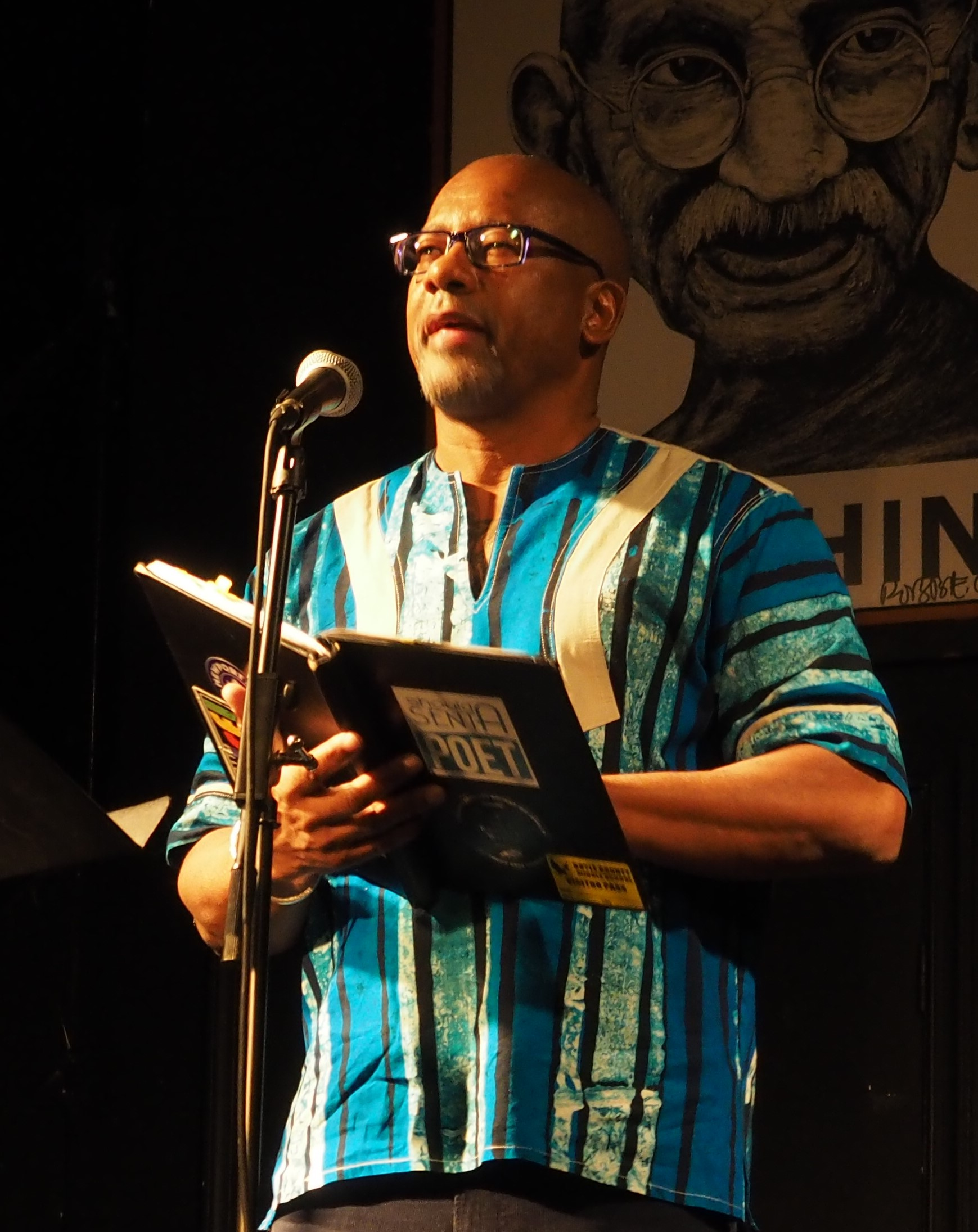
- Frank X Walker
- Born: June 11, 1961 (age 65); Danville, Kentucky
- Occupations: Poet, educator
- Writing career
- Period: 1990s–present
- Genres: Poetry, essays, visual art
- Subjects: Appalachia, history, African-American culture, environment, education

Frank X Walker Jr. (born June 11, 1961) is an African American poet from Danville, Kentucky. Walker coined the word "Affrilachia", signifying the importance of the African American presence in Appalachia: the "new word ... spoke to the union of Appalachian identity and the region's African-American culture and history". He is a professor in the English department at the University of Kentucky and was the Poet Laureate of Kentucky from 2013 to 2015.

== Biography ==
Walker was born in Danville, Kentucky, the second of eleven children. He grew up in Danville, where the family lived in public housing projects. He was an avid reader as a child. Walker describes himself as both a "nerd" and an athlete in his teenage years. At Danville High School, he played American football on the school team, was a member of several clubs, and was twice elected class president.

He was recruited to attend the University of Kentucky in engineering, but changed his major to English. Gurney Norman was one of his writing teachers at the University of Kentucky, where he received his undergraduate degree. Walker is a charter member of the Mu Theta chapter of Phi Beta Sigma fraternity at the University of Kentucky. He now holds life membership within the organization. It was during his college years that he adopted the middle initial "X", which was given to him by friends. He completed an MFA in Writing at Spalding University in May 2003.

A founding member of the Affrilachian Poets (started 1991), he also launched (as editor and publisher) PLUCK! – The New Journal of Affrilachian Art & Culture in 2007. In January 2010, he returned to the University of Kentucky to accept a position as professor in the English Department. In 2013, he was appointed Poet Laureate of Kentucky, the first African American to hold that position.

Walker has published five volumes of poetry; Buffalo Dance: The Journey of York won the 2004 Lillian Smith Book Award. Walker's poems have been converted into a stage production by the University of Kentucky Theatre Department. Walker was involved in the documentary Coal Black Voices, where he was a consulting producer.

Walker is founder and executive director of the Bluegrass Black Arts Consortium, Program Coordinator of the University of Kentucky's King Cultural Center, and assistant director of Purdue University's Black Cultural Center. He regularly teaches in writing programs like Fishtrap in Oregon and SplitRock at the University of Minnesota.

== Awards ==
- 2004 Lillian Smith Book Award
- 2006 Thomas D. Clark Literary Award for Excellence, Actors Theatre's Keeper of the Chronicle Award
- 2005 Lannan Literary Fellowship in Poetry (Recipient of a $75,000 grant)
- 2006 Kentucky Arts Council Al Smith Fellowship recipient
- 2013–14 Poet Laureate of Kentucky
- 2014 NAACP Image Award for Outstanding Literary Work – Poetry
- 2024 PEN/Voelcker Award for Poetry

== Work ==
=== Poetry ===
- Load in Nine Times. W. W. Norton & Company. 2024. ISBN 978-1-324-09493-7.
- Love House. Accents Publishing. 2023. ISBN 978-1-961127-03-6.
- Masked Man, Black. Accents Publishing. 2020. ISBN 978-1-936628-59-9.
- Ink Stains & Watermarks. Duncan Hill Press. 2017. ISBN 978-0-9790724-3-7.
- Turn Me Loose: The Unghosting of Medgar Evers. University of Georgia Press. 2013. ISBN 978-0-8203-4541-3..
- Isaac Murphy: I Dedicate This Ride. Old Cove Press. 2010. ISBN 978-0-9675424-3-0.
- When Winter Come: The Ascension of York. University Press of Kentucky. 2008. ISBN 978-0-8131-9184-3.
- Black Box. Old Cove Press. 2005. ISBN 978-0-9675424-1-6.
- Buffalo Dance: The Journey of York. University Press of Kentucky. 2003. ISBN 0-8131-9088-6.
- Affrilachia. Old Cove Press. 2000. ISBN 978-0-9675424-0-9.

=== Editor ===
- America! What's My Name? The "Other Poets" Unfurl the Flag. Wind Publications. 2007. ISBN 978-1-893239-63-0.
- Eclipsing a Nappy New Millennium. Haraka Press. 1998. ISBN 978-0-9664994-0-7.

=== Video ===
- Writing: Getting Ideas on Paper, PBS's GED Connection Series
- In Performance At the Governor's Mansion
- Living the Story: The Civil Rights Movement in Kentucky.

=== Video producer ===
- Coal Black Voices (the History of the Affrilachian Poets), consulting producer, received the 2002–2003 Jesse Stuart Award presented by the Kentucky School Media Association
- KY2NYC: Art/life & 9.11, exploring the effects of 9.11 on the arts community.
