= Lee Smith (fiction author) =

American fiction author (born 1944)

- Born: November 1, 1944 (age 81); Grundy, Virginia, U.S.
- Education: Hollins College
- Occupation: Writer
- Spouse(s): James Seay (divorced) Hal Crowther (m. 1985)
- Children: 2
- Writing career
- Genre: Fiction
- Website: leesmith.com

Lee Smith (born November 1, 1944) is an American fiction writer who often incorporates her background from the American South in her works. She has received many writing awards, such as the O. Henry Award, the American Academy of Arts and Letters Award for Fiction, and the North Carolina Award for Literature. Her novel The Last Girls was listed on the New York Times bestseller's list and won the Southern Book Critics Circle Award.

== Early life and education ==
Smith was born in 1944 in Grundy, Virginia, a small coal-mining town in the Appalachian Mountains, less than 10 miles from the Kentucky border. The Smith home sat on Main Street, and the Levisa Fork River ran just behind it. Her mother, Virginia Elizabeth née Marshall, known as "Gig", was a college graduate who taught school. Her father, Ernest Lee Smith, was the owner and operator of a Ben Franklin store in Grundy.

Growing up in the Appalachian Mountains of southwestern Virginia, nine-year-old Lee Smith was already writing—and selling, for a nickel apiece—stories about her neighbors in the coal boomtown of Grundy and the nearby isolated "hollers." After spending her last two years of high school at St. Catherine's School in Richmond, Virginia, Smith enrolled at Hollins College in Roanoke. She and fellow student Annie Dillard (the well-known essayist and novelist) became go-go dancers for an all-girl rock band, the Virginia Woolfs. In 1966, her senior year at Hollins, Smith submitted an early draft of a coming-of-age novel to a Book-of-the-Month Club contest and was awarded one of twelve fellowships. Two years later, that novel, The Last Day the Dog Bushes Bloomed (Harper & Row, 1968), became Smith's first published work of fiction.

Since 1968, she has published fifteen novels, as well as four collections of short stories, and has received many writing awards. Her memoir Dimestore: A Writer’s Life published in 2016 and constructed as a series of personal essays, is the story of her life in Grundy and beyond.

== Career ==
Following her graduation from Hollins, Smith married James Seay, a poet and teacher, whom she accompanied from university to university as his teaching assignments changed. They had two sons. In 1971 she had completed her second novel, Something in the Wind, which garnered generally favorable reviews. Her next novel was Fancy Strut (1973).

In 1974 Smith and her family moved to Chapel Hill, North Carolina, where she finished Black Mountain Breakdown (1981), a much darker work than her readers had come to expect. Next she turned her attention to short stories, for which she won O. Henry Awards in 1978 and 1980. Smith published her first collection of short stories Cakewalk in 1981. It was also about this time that her marriage broke up, and she accepted a teaching job at North Carolina State University in Raleigh, where she taught for many years. In 1983 her fifth novel, Oral History, became a Book-of-the-Month Club featured selection, exposing Smith for the first time to a wide national audience.

In 1985 she published Family Linen. That same year Smith - who was by then divorced from Seay - married journalist Hal Crowther, to whom she dedicated the new book.

Since then, Smith has published Fair and Tender Ladies (1988) and Me and My Baby View the Eclipse (1990), her second book of short stories. In 1992 she published The Devil's Dream, a generational saga about a family of country musicians. In 1995 her ninth novel, Saving Grace, was published, and in 1996 the novella The Christmas Letters, her eleventh work of fiction, was published. News of the Spirit, a collection of stories and novellas, was published in 1997, and she published New York Times Bestseller The Last Girls in 2002.

On Agate Hill (2006), is set in the piedmont South during Reconstruction. The New York Times found the young narrator's voice to be occasionally unconvincing, but praised "Smith's inventive storytelling".

Guests on Earth (2013) is based on the life of Zelda Fitzgerald. It is narrated by Evalina Toussaint, a former piano prodigy living in a mental hospital where she meets Zelda. The Washington Post called it "a carefully researched, utterly charming novel".

In April 2020, Smith published Blue Marlin, a novella that follows Jenny, an adventurous thirteen-year-old, down to Key West for a patched-up family vacation following the discovery of her father's illicit affair. The book was published by Blair.

In April 2023, Smith published Silver Alert.

Smith currently lives in Hillsborough, North Carolina with husband Hal Crowther.

== Bibliography ==
=== Novels ===
- The Last Day the Dogbushes Bloomed (1968)
- Something in the Wind (1971)
- Fancy Strut (1973)
- Black Mountain Breakdown (1980)
- Oral History (1983)
- Family Linen (1985)
- Fair and Tender Ladies (1988)
- The Devil's Dream (1992)
- Saving Grace (1995)
- The Christmas Letters (1996)
- The Last Girls (2003)
- On Agate Hill (2006)
- Guests on Earth (2013)
- Blue Marlin (2020)
- Silver Alert (2023)

=== Short story collections ===
- Cakewalk (1981)
- Me and My Baby View the Eclipse (1990)
- News of the Spirit (1997)
- Mrs. Darcy and the Blue-Eyed Stranger (2010)

=== Memoir ===
- Dimestore: A Writer's Life (2016)
