= Wayne Miller (poet) =

American poet (born 1976)

Wayne Joshua Miller (born January 10, 1976) is an American poet, editor, translator, and professor.

== Life and career ==
Born in Cincinnati, Ohio, Miller earned a BA from Oberlin College and an MFA from the University of Houston. For twelve years he taught at the University of Central Missouri, where he was an editor of the literary journal Pleiades. Since 2014 he has taught at the University of Colorado Denver, where he serves as editor/managing editor of Copper Nickel. With Kevin Prufer, he also co-curates the Unsung Masters Series.

=== Publications and critical reception ===
Miller's poems have appeared in numerous periodicals—including Boulevard, Crazyhorse, Field, The Paris Review, Ploughshares, Poetry, The Southern Review, and The Washington Post—and he has published four full-length poetry collections. His first collection, Only the Senses Sleep, published by New Issues Poetry & Prose in 2006, won the 2007 William Rockhill Nelson Award in Poetry and was named a Kansas City Star "noteworthy" book of 2006. Publishers Weekly called the book a "mature debut." Miller's next three collections were published by Milkweed Editions. The Book of Props, published in 2009, was described by The New Yorker as "mak[ing] a vast impact using the smallest stroke" and was named a best poetry book of the year by Coldfront Magazine and the Kansas City Star. The City, Our City, published in 2011, was a finalist for the 2012 William Carlos Williams Award from the Poetry Society of America. In a review of The City, Our City, Notre Dame Review called Miller "among the best poets in the USA"; Micah Bateman in The Kenyon Review, described the poems as "fierce lyrical investigations." Post-, published in 2016, won the 2017 Colorado Book Award and the 2017 Rilke Prize given to the best U.S. book of the year by a "mid-career poet." Phillip Garland, writing in Colorado Review, called Miller a "singular figure in American poetry," and Donna Seaman, writing in Booklist, described Post- as "witty and solemn, stoic and nimble." In Tupelo Quarterly, Sean Singer called Post- "a fascinating and wonderful book" and "a work of serious craft."

Miller has co-translated two books by the Albanian poet Moikom Zeqo, whom Miller met when he was a junior in college. I Don't Believe in Ghosts was published in 2007 by BOA Editions. In 2015, Zephyr Press published Zodiac, which was a finalist for the PEN Center USA Award in Translation.

Miller has co-edited three books: New European Poets (with Kevin Prufer), published by Graywolf Press; Tamura Ryuichi: On the Life & Work of a 20th Century Master (with Takako Lento), published through the Unsung Masters Series; and Literary Publishing in the Twenty-First Century (with Travis Kurowski and Kevin Prufer), published by Milkweed Editions.

=== Honors and awards ===
Miller received a 2000 Ruth Lilly Fellowship from the Poetry Foundation and, in 2001, the Bess Hokin Prize from Poetry Magazine. He has won the George Bogin Memorial Award, the Lyric Poetry Award, and, four times, the Lucille Medwick Memorial Award from the Poetry Society of America. In 2013, he received a Fulbright to Queen's University Belfast.

== Published works ==
=== Poetry collections ===
Post-. Milkweed Editions, 2016. ISBN 978-1571314703

The City, Our City. Milkweed Editions, 2011. ISBN 978-1571314451

The Book of Props. Milkweed Editions, 2009. ISBN 978-1571314352

Only the Senses Sleep. New Issues, 2006. ISBN 978-1930974654

=== Co-translated poetry collections ===
Zodiac. By Moikom Zeqo, trans. Anastas Kapurani and Wayne Miller. Zephyr Press, 2015. ISBN 978-1938890109

I Don't Believe in Ghosts. By Moikom Zeqo, trans. Wayne Miller et al. BOA Editions, 2007. ISBN 978-1934414019

=== Co-edited books ===
Literary Publishing in the Twenty-First Century. With Travis Kurowski & Kevin Prufer. Milkweed Editions, 2016. ISBN 978-1571313546

Tamura Ryuichi: On the Life & Work of a 20th Century Master. With Takako Lento. Pleiades Press, 2011. ISBN 978-0964145429

New European Poets. With Kevin Prufer. Graywolf Press, 2008. ISBN 978-1555974923
