= Tabula Poetica =

Directed by Anna Leahy and created in the spring of 2009 at Chapman University, Tabula Poetica is a poetry initiative that celebrates all things poetry by fostering discussion on the art of poetry through an annual lecture and reading series, the international journal TAB: A Journal of Poetry & Poetics, and other projects.

Past reading series participants include Pulitzer Prize winners Rae Armantrout and C. K. Williams, Carolyn Forché, Ada Límon, Alan Shapiro, Allison Joseph, Ilya Kaminsky, Allison Benis White, Karen An-hwei Lee, Linh Dinh, Richard Deming, Jen Bervin, Kate Greenstreet, Nancy Kuhl, Lynne Thompson, and others.

The journal TAB includes poetry, critical essays about poetry, poetry book reviews, and other content. Leahy serves as its editor, and Claudine Jaenichen serves as its Creative Director. A print issue appears every January, and electronic issues appear in March, May, July, September, and November. Poets whose work has appeared in TAB include C. K. Williams, Allison Joseph, Denise Duhamel, Laila Shikaki, and others. Tabula Poetica does the finalist judging in the California Coastal Commission K-12 Poetry Contest, and the May issue features winners and runners-up. Literary critic Marjorie Perloff has written two pieces in this journal.

Chloe Honum's poem 'Snow White' appeared in TAB in 2015 and was subsequently awarded a Pushcart Prize for 2016.

Jen Bervin and Nancy Kuhl were among Tabula Poetica's first visiting poets and were interviewed by Andrew Mauzey and Michael Dinsmoor. Their interview was published by the Poetry Foundation.

The Poetry Reading Series is supported, in part, by Poets & Writers, Inc. through a grant it has received from The James Irvine Foundation.

Staff for Tabula Poetica includes MFA students.
