= Lyric Poetry Award =

The Lyric Poetry Award is given once a year to a member of the Poetry Society of America and was "established under the will of PSA member Mrs. Consuelo Ford (Althea Urn), and also in memory of Mary Carolyn Davies, for a lyric poem on any subject."

Each winner receives a $500 prize.

== Winners ==
- 2025: Guion Pratt, Judge Richard Siken
- 2024: S. Brook Cortman, Judge: Richie Hofmann
- 2023: Casey Thayer, Judge: Sherwin Bitsui
- 2022: Armen Davoudian, Judge: Solmaz Sharif
- 2021: Marcus Wicker, Judge: Camonghne Felix
- 2020: Michael Dumanis, Judge: Hanif Abdurraqib
- 2019: Kelli Russell Agodon, Judge: Ilya Kaminsky
- 2018: Kevin Prufer, Judge: Mark Wunderlich
- 2017: Jericho Brown, Judge: Rachel Eliza Griffiths
- 2016: Philip Metres, Judge: Rowan Ricardo Phillips
- 2015: Julia Alvarez, Judge: Honorée Fanonne Jeffers
- 2014: Meghan Kemp-Gee, Judge: John Koethe
- 2013: Micah Bateman, Judge: Carolyne Wright
- 2012: Greg Wrenn, Judge: Matthew Dickman
- 2011: Patrick Phillips, Judge: Deborah Garrison
- 2010: Ira Sadoff, Judge: Meghan O'Rourke
- 2009: Susan Kinsolving, Judge: Lucie Brock-Broido
- 2008: Wayne Miller, Judge: Elizabeth Macklin
- 2007: Ed Skoog, Judge: Srikanth Reddy
- 2006: Alice Jones, Judge: Toi Derricotte
- 2005: Lee Upton, Judge: Susan Wheeler
- 2004: Carol Ciavonne, Judge: D. A. Powell
- 2002: Shira Dentz, Judge: Mark Levine
- 2001: Gary Young

== See also ==
- Poetry Society of America
- List of American literary awards
- List of poetry awards
- List of years in poetry
