= George Bogin =

American poet and translator (1920–1988)

George Bogin in 1983

George Bogin (April 28, 1920 – October 7, 1988) was an American poet and translator whose work was published in books, as well as in academic journals and magazines.

== Life ==
Bogin was born in New York City in 1920. He was a 1939 graduate of Columbia College, and the university holds the archive of his papers.

== Poetry ==
His poem "Pitchipoi" is one of two texts for the opera Pitchipoi, The Children of Drancy (1983) by Lloyd Ultan. In addition to his own poetry, Bogin was known for his translation of poetry from the French and Italian, especially by Jules Supervielle. He also translated the work of Alain Bosquet.

In later life he lived at Great Neck, Long Island, where he co-founded the Great Neck Peace Forum. He was married to Ruth née Fleischer (1920–99); they had two daughters. He died of lymphoma on October 7, 1988. The Poetry Society of America's George Bogin Memorial Award was created to honor him after his death.

== Works ==
- In a Surf of Strangers (1981)
- Jules Supervielle. Selected Poems and Reflections on the Art of Poetry (1985) – translation
