= Lisa Lubasch =

American poet

- Born: 1973 (age 52–53)
- Education: Yale University; Johns Hopkins University; Iowa Writers' Workshop
- Occupation: Poet
- Writing career
- Genre: Poetry

Lisa Lubasch is an American poet.

== Life ==
Lubasch received her BA in English from Yale University, an MA in writing from Johns Hopkins University, and an MFA in Poetry from the Iowa Writers’ Workshop.

She is the author of five collections of poetry, including So I Began, Twenty-One After Days, To Tell the Lamp, and How Many More of Them Are You? which received the Norma Farber First Book Award from the Poetry Society of America. Selections from How Many More of Them Are You? were translated into French in 2002 and appear as a chapbook in Un bureau sur l'Atlantique's Format Américain series.

She has been an editor of Double Change, a French-American poetry web journal.

Lubasch lives in New York City. She coedits the press Solid Objects, out of Brooklyn, NY.

== Awards ==
- 2000 Norma Farber First Book Award, How Many More of Them Are You?
- 2005-2006 The Gertrude Stein Awards, Twenty-One After Days

== Works ==
- "Certain Hazards of Living Without the Assumption of Timing". Web Conjunctions. September 2002.
- "[A Sounding at the Ear]". A Public Space (22).
- "Getting Around It". Boston Review. April 2014.
- "The Situation/Evidence". A Public Space. Summer 2008.
- "Lisa Lubasch on 'The Situation/Evidence' at the Poetry Society of America".
- "[Out of Inventiveness—Looking]". Jubilat (10).
- "Ordering Things". Electronic Poetry Review (6). September 2003.
- "Ordering Things 2". Electronic Poetry Review (6). September 2003.
- "Ordering Things 3". Electronic Poetry Review (6). September 2003.
- "[lampshades will admit of the spectacular—are they hosts to other things?]". Boston Review. Summer 2005.
- "This in Branch Will Catch; Winter Enters Fretfully; Lightness Is Unfolding". Coconut Poetry. 22 June 2025.

=== Poetry Books ===
- So I Began. Solid Objects. 2014. ISBN 978-0-9844142-5-3.
- Twenty-One After Days. Avec Books. 2006. ISBN 978-1-880713-37-2.
- To Tell the Lamp. Avec. 2004. ISBN 978-1-880713-33-4.
- Vicinities. Avec. 2001. ISBN 978-1-880713-27-3.
- How Many More of Them Are You?. Avec. 1999. ISBN 978-1-880713-19-8.

=== Translation ===
- Paul Éluard (2007). A Moral Lesson. Green Integer. ISBN 978-1-931243-95-7.
- Paul Éluard (March–April 2006). "Clock of Secret Weddings; Memories and the Present". Green Integer Review (2). Archived from the original on 2009-09-18.
- "Everything is One; The Seven Veils; The Despair Need to Love". Double Change. 2003.
