= Cammy Thomas =

American poet

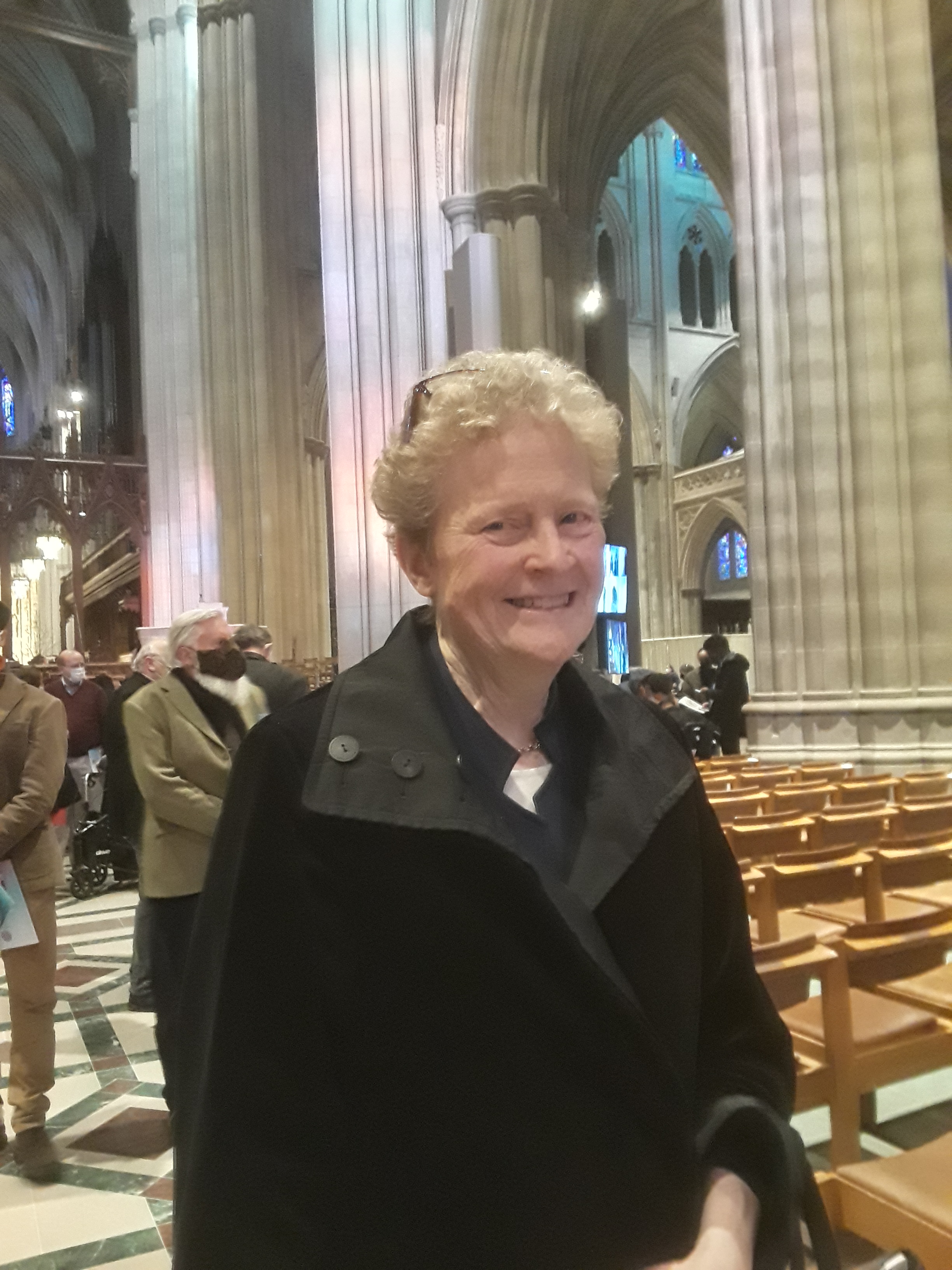
Thomas after the premiere of Far Past War at the Washington National Cathedral, March 2022

Cammy Thomas is an American poet. Her first book, Cathedral of Wish, received the Norma Farber First Book Award from the Poetry Society of America. A fellowship from the Ragdale Foundation helped her complete her second, Inscriptions. Her third collection, Tremors, appeared in 2021. All are published by Four Way Books. Two of her poems, under the title Far Past War, were set to music by her sister, composer Augusta Read Thomas. The premiere of this choral work was performed by the Cathedral Choral Society at the National Cathedral in Washington, D.C. in March, 2022. Thomas currently lives in Bolton, Massachusetts.

== Published works ==
=== Full-length poetry collections ===
- Tremors (Four Way Books, 2021)
- Inscriptions (Four Way Books, 2014)
- Cathedral of Wish (Four Way Books, 2005)

=== Poems and links ===
- Pandemic Poems (Indolent Books' What Rough Beast poem-a-day series, Oct., 2020)
- The Crypt of the Capuchins (Image Journal, Issue 107)
- The Blues in My Heart, The Rhythm in My Soul (The Missouri Review, 2017)
- November 1968 (Indolent Books, 2017)

== Honors and awards ==
- 2006 Norma Farber First Book Award from the Poetry Society of America
- Ragdale Fellowship, 2007
