= V. Penelope Pelizzon =

American poet and professor

- Education: UMass Boston; UC Irvine; University of Missouri
- Writing career
- Genres: Poem; translated poem
- Notable awards: Norma Farber First Book; 2001 Nostos

V. Penelope Pelizzon is an American poet and essayist. Her first poetry collection, Nostos (2000), won the Hollis Summers Prize, awarded by Ohio University Press, and the Poetry Society of America's Norma Farber First Book Award. Her second poetry collection, Whose Flesh Is Flame, Whose Bone Is Time (2014), was a finalist for the Anthony Hecht Poetry Prize. Her third, A Gaze Hound That Hunteth By the Eye (2024), was longlisted for the National Book Critics Circle Award, and was a Times Literary Supplement book of the year and one of Literary Hub's "Favorite Poetry Collections" of 2024. She is co-author of Tabloid, Inc. (2010), a critical study of film, photography, and crime narratives. She is an editor at Waywiser Books and a professor of English at the University of Connecticut.

== Education ==
Pelizzon graduated from University of Massachusetts, Boston, University of California, Irvine, and University of Missouri in 1998.

== Academic career ==
Pelizzon has taught at University of California, Irvine, University of Missouri, Washington and Jefferson College, and University of Connecticut.

== Writing ==
Her work has appeared in Poetry, Orion, The Hudson Review, Ecotone, 32 Poems, The Kenyon Review, Field, The New England Review, Narrative, The Harvard Review, The Gettysburg Review, The Missouri Review, Plume, ZYZZYVA, and Fourth Genre.

== Personal life ==
She is married to Anthony Deaton, a foreign service officer.

== Awards and recognition ==
- 2026 Guggenheim Fellowship in Poetry
- 2024 A Gaze Hound That Hunteth By the Eye longlisted for the National Book Critics Circle Award
- 2024 A Gaze Hound That Hunteth by the Eye listed as a Times Literary Supplement Book of the Year and a LitHub "Favorite Poetry Collection" of 2024
- 2021 Editor's Choice Selection for the Quarterly West Chapbook Award, for Of Vinegar Of Pearl
- 2019 Hawthornden Residency Fellowship for poetry
- 2012 The Amy Lowell Poetry Travelling Scholarship
- 2012 Center for Book Arts chapbook award for Human Field
- 2008 Lannan Writing Residency Fellowship
- 2003 Campbell Corner Poetry Prize
- 2001 Norma Farber First Book Award, for Nostos, by Poetry Society of America
- 1999 Hollis Summers Prize
- The Kenneth Rexroth Translation Award, for Umberto Saba's poems from Italian
- 1997 The 92nd Street Y's "Discovery"/ The Nation Award

== Works ==
=== Books ===
- A Gaze Hound That Hunteth by the Eye. University of Pittsburgh Press, 2024. ISBN 9780822967217
- Whose Flesh Is Flame, Whose Bone Is Time. The Waywiser Press. 2014. ISBN 978-1-904130-60-4
- Tabloid, Inc: Crimes, Newspapers, Narratives. Ohio State University Press. 2010. ISBN 978-0814292150. Pelizzon and Nancy M. West discuss tabloid newspapers, especially those of the late 1920s and early 1930s, using a combination of narrative and film theory.
- Nostos. Ohio University Press. 2000. ISBN 978-0-8214-1298-5.

=== Magazine and journal publications ===
- "Animals & Instruments", Narrative, Spring 2022.
- "A Gaze Hound That Hunteth By the Eye", Plume, issue 120, August 2021.
- "Some Say", Ecotone no. 28, Spring 2020.
- "Elegy for Estrogen", Ecotone, no. 27, spring/summer 2019.
- "Orts & Slarts", Tin House online, May 2019.
- The Village Voice, National Poetry Month Feature, 21 April 2015.
- "Light Speaking: Notes on Poetry and Photography", Poetry, vol. 202, no. 2, May 2013.
- "Nulla Dies Sine Linea", Poetry, vol. 200, no. 1, Apr. 2012.
- "Blood Memory", Poetry, vol. 195, no. 4, Jan. 2010.
- "Seven Penitential Psalms", Poetry, vol. 187, no. 2, Nov. 2005.
- "Memoire on the Heliograph", Fourth Genre, vol. 6, no. 2, 2004.
- "Clever and Poor". poemhunter. 20 January 2003.
- "The Monongahela Book of Hours". Language Exchange. 2003. Archived from the original on 2008-07-20.

=== Translation ===
- "Runic Signature from Cynewulf's Fates of the Apostles", with translator’s note, Poetry, vol.198, no. 3, June 2011.
- Umberto Saba (1999). "two poems". The Seneca Review. 24 (1): 76–77.
- Umberto Saba (1997–1998). "four poems". Compost. 9: 34–35.
