= Jules Supervielle =

Franco-Uruguayan poet and writer (1884–1960)

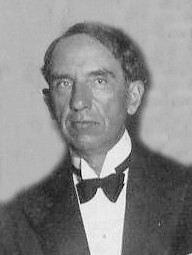
- Born: 16 January 1884; Montevideo, Uruguay
- Died: 17 May 1960 (aged 76); Paris, France

Jules Supervielle (16 January 1884 – 17 May 1960) was a Franco-Uruguayan poet and writer born in Montevideo. He was nominated for the Nobel Prize in Literature three times.

He opposed the surrealism movement in poetry and rejected automatic writing, although he did adopt other techniques of modern poetry. In so doing he anticipated the literary movements of the late 1940s, including the work of such authors as René Char, Henri Michaux, Saint-John Perse or Francis Ponge. Amongst his admirers are René-Guy Cadou, Alain Bosquet, Lionel Ray, Claude Roy, Philippe Jaccottet and Jacques Réda.

== Personal life ==
Supervielle was born in Montevideo, Uruguay, to a family in charge of a bank; his father was from Béarn and his mother of Basque origin. His parents both died before he was a year old, during a family visit to France, and he was raised first by his grandmother and later, on returning to Uruguay, by his aunt and uncle. He began writing fables at age nine. In 1894 he moved to Paris with his aunt and uncle, and published a collection of poems entitled Brumes du passé in 1901. He married Pilar Saavedra in Montevideo in 1906; the two had six children.

== Career ==
In 1910 Supervielle submitted his literature thesis on The feeling of nature in Spanish-American poetry. He was conscripted during the First World War and served until 1917, at which time he returned to poetry. The publication of his poems in 1919 drew the attention of André Gide and Paul Valéry and put him in contact with the Nouvelle Revue Française (NRF). He published his first significant collection, Débarcadères, in 1922, and his first novel, L'Homme de la pampa, in 1923. In 1925, he published one of the major collections of French-speaking poetry of the 20th century: Gravitations. Six years later he published a book of short fantasies, L'Enfant de la haute mer (five texts published between 1924 and 1930 plus three originals). His first important play, La Belle au bois, was also written at this time.

During the Second World War, Supervielle had health and financial difficulties, and temporarily relocated to Uruguay. He was named Officier de la Legion d'honneur and received several literary prizes. After the war's conclusion he returned to France as the cultural correspondent to the legation of Uruguay in Paris. He published his first mythological tales under the title Orphée in 1946. In 1947, Supervielle's Shéhérazade was one of the three plays directed by Jean Vilar at the first festival d'Avignon.

Supervielle published an autobiographical account entitled Boire à la source in 1951, followed by his last collection of poetry, Le Corps tragique, in 1959. He was elected Prince des poètes ("Prince of poets") shortly before his death in Paris in May 1960.

== Legacy ==
Several of his poems were set to music by Maurice Jaubert.

In 1990, the city of Oloron-Sainte-Marie created the Jules-Supervielle Prize; among the prize winners are major contemporary poets: Alain Bosquet, Eugène Guillevic, Henri Thomas, Jean Grosjean and Lionel Ray. Supervielle's complete poetic works were published in the Bibliothèque de La Pléiade, by Éditions Gallimard, in 1996.

The Lycée Français de Montevideo takes his name from him.

== Studies about his work ==
- Claude Roy, Supervielle, Paris, Poésies P., NRF, 1970
- Sabine Dewulf, Jules Supervielle ou la connaissance poétique - Sous le soleil d’oubli, coll. Critiques Littéraires, in two volumes, Paris, éd. L’Harmattan, 2001

== English translations ==
English text with French parallel text:

- James Kirkup, Denise Levertov, Kenneth Rexroth and Alan Pryce-Jones, Jules Supervielle: Selected Writings, New Directions, New York, 1967
- George Bogin, Jules Supervielle: Selected Poems and Reflections on the Art of Poetry, SUN, New York, 1985
- Les Amis Inconnus/Unknown Friends, translation by Philip Cranston, Scripta Humanistica (162), 2008
