= Coultas =

Coultas is a surname. Notable people with the surname include:

- Brenda Coultas, American poet
- Nigel Coultas, British Paralympic athlete
- Rowan Coultas (born 1997), British snowboarder
