= Suji Kwock Kim =

Korean poet-playwright

- Education: Yale College, Iowa Writers' Workshop, Seoul National University, Yonsei University, Stanford University, Princeton University
- Spouse: Raymond Short (m. 2007)
- Writing career
- Genres: Poetry, Plays, Music

Suji Kwock Kim is a Korean-American-British poet and playwright.

== Early life and education ==
Kim's parents, grandparents and great-grandparents were all born in what's now North Korea. Her maternal great-grandfather co-founded 조선어학회, the Korean Language Society, during the Japanese occupation of Korea. He later became a Dean and linguistics professor at Yonsei University in Seoul.

Kim was educated at Yale University, the University of Iowa Writers' Workshop, Seoul National University and Yonsei University, where she was a Fulbright Scholar, Stanford University, where she was a Wallace Stegner Fellow, and Princeton University, where she was a Hodder Fellow.

== Career ==
Kim's work has been published in Best American Poetry, The New York Times, Washington Post, Los Angeles Times, The Guardian, New Statesman, Irish Examiner, Slate, The Nation, The New Republic, The Paris Review, London Magazine, Poetry London, Poetry, recorded for BBC Radio, National Public Radio, Canadian Broadcasting Corporation, Radio Free Genoa, Radio Free Amsterdam, Poetry Unbound and The Slowdown; and translated into German, Spanish, Portuguese, Italian, Ukrainian, Russian, Romanian, Croatian, Korean, Japanese, Arabic, and Bengali.

=== Music and theatre ===
Choral and vocal settings of her poems, composed by Mayako Kubo for the Tokyo Philharmonic Chorus, Chorusorganisation, Koreanische Frauengruppe Berlin, Japanische Fraueninitiative Berlin, and Das Berliner Frauen-Vokalensemble, premiered at Pablo Casals Hall, Tokyo, and have been performed at St. Mathias Church in Berlin, St. Geltow Church in Potsdam, Kulturkirche in Petzow, Festival für zeitgenössische Musik in Bielefeld, Gefördert vom Kulturamt des Stadt in Düsseldorf, Germany. Vocal settings of her work, composed by Jerome Blais, premiered at Dalhousie Orchestra in Halifax, Nova Scotia, recorded by the Canadian Broadcasting Corporation (CBC), then were later performed by the Solera Quartet at the Art Institute of Chicago, May 2019, and recorded by WFMT-Chicago. Kim co-authored Private Property, a multimedia play showcased at Playwrights Horizons (NY) and produced at the Edinburgh Fringe Festival (Scotland).

== Awards ==
- The Nation/ Discovery Award
- Walt Whitman Award from the Academy of American Poets
- Addison Metcalf Award from the American Academy of Arts and Letters
- Whiting Writers' Award
- Northern California Book Award/ Bay Area Book Reviewers Award
- Griffin International Poetry Prize shortlist
- Lucille Medwick Award from the Poetry Society of America
- two George Bogin Memorial Awards from the Poetry Society of America
- O'Donoghue Award from Munster Literature Centre, Ireland
- International Book & Pamphlet Award, U.K.
- Hodder Fellowship, Princeton University
- 2026 Creative Capital Award
- 2026 Guggenheim Fellowship

== Works ==
- Notes from the Divided Country (Louisiana State University Press)
- Notes from the North (Smith/Doorstop, U.K.)
- Private Property (multimedia play, Edinburgh Festival Fringe)
- Flights (texts for choral compositions by Mayako Kubo, Tokyo Philharmonic Chorus, Chorusorganisation, Koreanische Frauengruppe Berlin, Japanische Fraueninitiative Berlin)
- War Songs (texts for soprano and chamber choir by Mayako Kubo, Das Berliner Frauen-Vokalensemble)
- Fragments from a Broken Country (texts for compositions for voice and orchestra by Jerome Blais, Dalhousie Orchestra, Halifax, Nova Scotia, and Solera Quartet, Art Institute of Chicago)

== Anthologies ==
- American Religious Poems, ed. Harold Bloom. (Library of America)
- American War Poetry: 1700-2020, ed. Lorrie Goldensohn. (Columbia University Press)
- Asian-American Poetry: The Next Generation. (University of Illinois Press)
- Backpack Literature, ed. Dana Gioia. (Pearson Longman)
- The Bedford Introduction to Literature, 13th edition (Macmillan)
- Berliner Anthologie (Alexander Verlag, in association with Internationales Literaturfestival Berlin)
- Best American Poetry 2018. (Scribner)
- Best American Poetry 2016. (Scribner)
- Big Brutal Acts. (Harbor Anthologies/ Small Harbor Publishing)
- Century of the Tiger: One Hundred Years of Korean Culture in America. (University of Hawaii Press)
- Contemporary American Poetry. (Penguin)
- Современная Американская Поэзия: Поэты США В Русских Переводах (Contemporary American Poetry in Russian Translation). (Dalkey Archive and OSI Publishers, Moscow, in association with the National Endowment for the Arts)
- Crossing State Lines: An American Renga. (Farrar, Straus and Giroux)
- Echoes Upon Echoes: New Korean American Writing, ed. Elaine Kim. (Temple University Press)
- The Future Dictionary of America, ed. Dave Eggers. (McSweeney's)
- The Griffin Poetry Prize Anthology. (House of Anansi Press, Toronto, Canada)
- Inside Literature. (Pearson Longman)
- An Introduction to Poetry. (Pearson Longman)
- The Koreas, Charles Armstrong. (Routledge)
- Language for a New Century: Contemporary Voices from the Middle East, Asia and Beyond. (W. W. Norton)
- Legitimate Dangers: American Poets of the New Century. (Sarabande)
- Lineas Conectadas: Nueva Poesia de los Estates Unidos. (la Universidad Nacional Autónoma de México, México City, and Sarabande, in Spanish translation, in association with the National Endowment for the Arts)
- Literature: A Pocket Anthology. (Penguin)
- Literature: A Portable Anthology. (Macmillan/ Bedford St Martin's)
- Literature: An Introduction to Fiction, Poetry, Drama, and Writing. (Pearson Longman)
- Love is Strong as Death. (Penguin Australia-New Zealand)
- A Mingling of Waters. (Supernova P&D Pvt. Ltd., Kolkata, India, in association with the Kolkata Book Fair)
- On Occasion. (Coach House Books, Toronto, Canada)
- The Paris Review Book for Planes, Trains, Elevators and Waiting Rooms. (Picador)
- Places of Poetry: Mapping the Nation in Verse (Poetry Society/ One World, U.K.)
- Poet's Choice: Poems from the Washington Post (Harcourt)
- Poetry: A Pocket Anthology. (Penguin)
- Poetry For Students. (Thomson Gale)
- Poetry On Record, 1888-2006: 98 Poets Read Their Work. (Shout Factory/ Sony BMG Music)
- Poetry 30. (University of West Virginia Press)
- Roots and Seeds. (Hazel Press, U.K.)
- Staying Human. (Bloodaxe, U.K.)
- To Gather Your Leaving: Asian Diaspora Poetry. (Ethos Books, Singapore)
- The Wounded Line. (University of New Mexico Press)
- Twenty Years of Poem of the Week. (Madville Books)
