= Mary Jane Nealon =

American poet and nurse

- Education: Warren Wilson College (MFA)
- Occupations: Poet; nurse
- Writing career
- Notable awards: Lucille Medwick Memorial Award (2001)

Mary Jane Nealon is an American poet, and registered nurse.

== Life ==
She was raised in Jersey City, New Jersey. She received her MFA from Warren Wilson College in Asheville, North Carolina. From 1976, she worked as a nurse in New Jersey and New York City. After the September 11 attacks, she studied the effects of trauma.

She was published in Forklift, Ohio, Mid American review, The Paris Review, The Kenyon Review, and Poets Against the War.

She currently works with people with HIV/AIDS at Partnership Health Center, Missoula, Montana, where she lives.

== Awards ==
- 1995-1996, 1996-1997 fellowships from The Fine Arts Work Center in Provincetown
- awards from the New Jersey State Council on the Arts, the Mid-Atlantic Arts Foundation
- Lucille Medwick Memorial Award of the Poetry Society of America in 2001.
- 2004-2005 Amy Lowell Poetry Travelling Scholarship

== Works ==
- "Her Father Must Be a Skywriter", poets.org

=== Books ===
- Rogue Apostle. Four Way Books. 2000. ISBN 978-1-884800-31-3.
- Immaculate Fuel. Four Way Books. May 2004. ISBN 978-1-884800-53-5.
- Beautiful Unbroken: One Nurse's Life. Grey Wolf Press. May 2004. ISBN 978-1-555975-90-6.

=== Anthology ===
- Justin Daniel Belmont, ed. (2005). The Art of Bicycling. Breakaway Books. ISBN 978-1-891369-56-8.
- By Judy Schaefer, ed. (2006). The poetry of nursing. Kent State University Press. ISBN 978-0-87338-848-1. "Mary Jane Nealon."

=== Nursing ===
- Nealon, Mary Jane (1993). "Journal Keeping and Increased Self-Awareness: A Working Tool for Healers". Journal of Addictions Nursing. 5 (3): 90–94. doi:10.3109/10884609309149715. ISSN 1088-4602. S2CID 73309980.
