= Melissa Studdard =

American poet

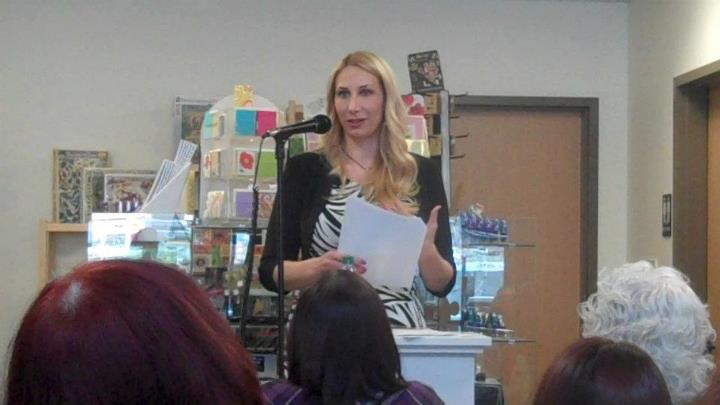
- Studdard reading at Flintridge Bookstore and Coffeehouse in Los Angeles in 2012
- Born: Tuscaloosa, Alabama, U.S.
- Education: University of Houston (BA, MA); Sarah Lawrence College (MFA)
- Occupations: Poet, Librettist, Lyricist, Author
- Known for: Dear Selection Committee, I Ate the Cosmos for Breakfast
- Website: Melissa Studdard

Melissa Studdard was born in Tuscaloosa, Alabama and is an American poet, librettist, lyricist, and author. Her most recent book is the poetry collection Dear Selection Committee. The title poem from her collection I Ate the Cosmos for Breakfast was produced as a short film and featured as an official selection at the Trinidad and Tobago Film Festival and the Minneapolis–Saint Paul International Film Festival. Her middle-grade novel, Six Weeks to Yehidah won a Forward National Literature Award and Pinnacle Book Achievement Award. The accompanying journal, My Yehidah, was released in December 2011 and was adopted by art and play therapists for clinical use in adolescent therapy sessions.

Studdard is the former host and producer of VIDA Voices & Views for Vida: Women in Literary Arts. In her podcast work she has interviewed such figures as Jane Hirshfield, Rita Dove, Julia Cameron, Robert Pinsky, Patricia Smith, Cheryl Strayed, Joy Harjo, and Krista Tippett. Studdard is also a past president of the Women's Caucus and moderated their annual meeting at the Association of Writers & Writing Programs conference. She is also an honorary Professor at the International Art Academy in Volos, Greece. She co-hosts the poetry series "Poems You Need" with Kelli Russell Agodon. The two are also known for their collaborative poetry.

== Early life ==
Melissa Studdard was born in Tuscaloosa, Alabama, United States, and was raised in Texas. She received her B.A. (1991) and M.A. (1995) from the University of Houston, and her M.F.A. (1997) from Sarah Lawrence College.

While at the University of Houston, Studdard worked on the college's literary journal, Gulf Coast, as a production editor, curated the Gulf Coast Reading Series, and taught college courses for the Houston Community College System.

While at Sarah Lawrence College, she worked as an assistant editor at Chelsea (magazine) and taught for City University of New York at Baruch College, John Jay College, and Hunter College. She then briefly taught at San Jose State University and the University of Houston–Downtown, prior to accepting a full-time teaching position with Lone Star College in 2001.

== Books ==
- Siddhartha, She, (Ecstatic Motion Press, 2025) ASIN B0FJSMJNXX
- Dear Selection Committee, (Jackleg Press, 2022) ISBN 9781733023313
- Like a Bird with a Thousand Wings, with Christopher Theofanidis (Saint Julian Press, 2020) ISBN 9781733023313
- I Ate the Cosmos for Breakfast (Saint Julian Press, 2014) ISBN 9780988944756
- The Tiferet Talk Interviews (Tiferet Press, 2013) ISBN 9780615737591
- My Yehidah (All Things That Matter Press, 2011) ISBN 9780984721566
- Six Weeks to Yehidah (All Things That Matter Press, 2011) ISBN 9780984651702

== Musical Collaborations ==
- Siddhartha, She, with Christopher Theofanidis
- We Are Love, with Reena Esmail
- Door Out of the Fire, with Christopher Theofanidis

=== Selected short works ===
Studdard's work has been published in multiple journals, magazines, newspapers, blogs sites, and anthologies, including The New York Times, The Best American Poetry, Ms. Magazine, Poetry (magazine), The Guardian, The Academy of American Poets' Poem-a-Day, Southern Humanities Review, Kenyon Review, Harvard Review, Verse Daily, Missouri Review, and Psychology Today.

== Awards and honors ==
- 2026: Winner: Alice Fay Di Castagnola Award for a maunscript-in-progress from Poetry Society of America for "Please Don't Feed Alphabet Soup to the Poets".
- 2025 Highly Commended: Bridport Prize for Poetry from Bridport Arts Centre.
- 2023 Winner: Tom Howard/Margaret Reid Poetry Contest.
- 2022 Finalist: Julie Suk Award.
- 2020: Winner: Lucille Medwick Memorial Award for poem on a humanitarian theme for "Migration Patterns". Poetry Society of America.
- 2020: Longlist: The Emerging Poet Award. Palette Poetry.
- 2020: Runner Up: The Gregory O'Donoghue International Poetry Prize for "In the house, I built another house" and "When my lover says hippopotomonstrosesquippedaliophobia". Munster Literature Centre.
- 2019: Winner: The Penn Review Poetry Prize for "The Pain is so resplendent it has babies". The Penn Review.
- 2019: Winner: Tom Howard/Margaret Reid Poetry Contest for "Migration Patterns". Winning Writers.
- 2019: Runner Up: Jeffrey E. Smith Editors' Prize'. The Missouri Review.
- 2019: Winner: REELpoetry Audience Choice Award 2019] for I Ate the Cosmos for Breakfast. REELpoetry International Film Festival.
- 2019: Shortlist: Aesthetica Creative Writing Award 2019 for "Fascinating the Parts of Us". Aesthetica Magazine.
- 2019: Poet-in-Residence: Hermitage Artist Retreat.
- 2019: Semifinalist: Jack Grapes Poetry Prize 2019. Cultural Weekly.
- 2018: Winner: Kathak Literary Award 2018/19. Dhaka International Poets Summit.
- 2015: Inclusion: Bettering American Poetry for "Respect"
- 2015: Finalist: Readers’ Favorite Bronze Award for I Ate the Cosmos for Breakfast
- 2013: Winner: International Book Award for 2013 Six Weeks to Yehidah
- 2013: Winner: Readers Favorite Award for The Tiferet Talk Interviews
- 2013: Winner: The Pinnacle Book Achievement Award for The Tiferet Talk Interviews
- 2012: Finalist: Readers Favorite Award for Six Weeks to Yehidah
- 2012: Finalist: The National Indie Excellence Award for Six Weeks to Yehidah
- 2012: Winner: The Pinnacle Book Achievement Award for Six Weeks to Yehidah
- 2011: Winner: The Forward National Literature Award for Six Weeks to Yehidah
