= George Bogin Memorial Award =

American poetry prize

The Poetry Society of America's George Bogin Memorial Award is given "by the family and friends of George Bogin for a selection of four or five poems that use language in an original way to reflect the encounter of the ordinary and the extraordinary and to take a stand against oppression in any of its forms."

Each winner receives a $500 prize.

== Winners ==
- 2001: Brian Henry
- 2002: Kevin Prufer, Judge: Jill Bialosky
- 2003: Susan Terris, Judge: Sonia Sanchez
- 2004: Kevin Prufer, Judge: Tory Dent
- 2005: G.C. Waldrep
- 2006: Kevin Prufer, Judge: Marie Howe
- 2007: Wayne Miller, Judge: Eleni Sikelianos
- 2008: Theresa Sotto, Judge: Prageeta Sharma
- 2009: Rusty Morrison, Judge: John Yau
- 2010: Sawnie Morris, Judge: Hettie Jones
- 2011: Suji Kwock Kim, Judge: Aimee Nezhukumatathil, Finalists: Hadara Bar-Nadav, Rebecca Morgan Frank, Leslie Williams
- 2012: Suji Kwock Kim, Judge: Evie Shockley, Finalists: Rebecca Morgan Frank, Mary Morris
- 2013: Paula Bohince, Judge: Cate Marvin, Finalists: Jamaal May, Lucy Ricciardi
- 2014: Gary Young, Judge: Jessica Greenbaum, Finalists: Meena Alexander and Jane Wong
- 2015: Dean Rader, Judge: Stephen Burt, Finalists: Nina Puro and Diana Khoi Nguyen
- 2016: Adam O. Davis, Judge: Eduardo Corral, Finalists: Shara Lessley and Purvi Shah
- 2017: Marie La Viña, Judge: Victoria Redel, Finalists: Beth Bachmann, Kai Carlson-Wee, Aidan Forster, and Brian Tierney
- 2018: Brian Tierney, Judge: Daniel Borzutzky, Finalists Catherine Imbriglio and Cate Lycurgus
- 2019: Sarah Henning
- 2020: JinJin Xu
- 2021 Natalie Eilbert, Judge: Shane McCrae
- 2022: Ina Cariño, Judge: Mai Der Vang
- 2023: Tom Thompson, Finalist: Katie Farris, Judge: Atsuro Riley
- 2024: Matt Flores, Judge: Claire Schwartz
- 2025: Migwi Mwangi, Judge: Sumita Chakraborty

== See also ==
- Poetry Society of America
- List of American literary awards
- List of poetry awards
- List of years in poetry
