= Anna Leahy =

American poet and non-fiction writer

- Born: Illinois, United States
- Education: Knox College; Iowa State University; University of Maryland; Ohio University
- Occupations: Writer, editor, professor, program director
- Partner: Douglas R. Dechow
- Relatives: Mary Lee Leahy (mother); Andrew Leahy (father); Brigid Leahy (sister)
- Writing career
- Language: English, German
- Years active: 2000–
- Genres: Poetry, nonfiction
- Subjects: Illness, medical humanities, game theory
- Notable awards: Wick Poetry Prize
- Movement: Poetry of science
- Website: amleahy.com

Anna Leahy is an American poet and nonfiction writer. The author of numerous books of poetry, essays, and creative writing pedagogy, Leahy directs the Tabula Poetica Center for Poetry and MFA in Creative Writing program at Chapman University in Orange, California. In 2013, she was named editor of TAB: The Journal of Poetry & Poetics.

== Career ==
Leahy's poetry and nonfiction have won citations for their “lucid and beautiful consideration of what is means at the physical level to be human and to be whole.” Her first chapbook Hagioscope won the Sow's Ear Press Competition in 2000, and her first full-length, Constituents of Matter won the Wick Poetry Prize from Kent State University in 2006. In 2016, her essays won top prizes from both Ninth Letter and Dogwood, and have been listed among the Notables in The Best American Essays of 2013, 2016, and 2017.

Leahy's poetry draws from concepts and terminology of science. Constituents of Matter was reviewed favorably in The Women's Review of Books among others, citing the effective use of scientific and logical systems such as game theory and the scientific method as “metaphors and models to characterize what is unseen”. Aperture, Deborah Hauser writes, is “five tightly structured sections and a coda [which] shine a spotlight on the lives of women as diverse as the mothers left behind in The Wizard of Oz, Mary Todd Lincoln, Lizzie Siddal (photographer’s model), and Katherine Johnson (NASA mathematician).” Eileen Murphy contends the "poems are varied, thoughtful, and often ironic or humorous . . . the reader looks through the mind-opening with the poet as guide, listens to unique women’s voices, revels in them, learns from them, is haunted by them."

Leahy's nonfiction books include Tumor in the Object Lessons series from Bloomsbury Publishing, and Conversing with Cancer with Lisa Sparks. From 2010 to 2017, she co-authored a blog with Douglas R. Dechow, Lofty Ambitions, about aviation and space, which culminated in a visiting fellowship at the American Library in Paris in fall 2016 and Generation Space: A Love Story, which follows the end of the Space Shuttle program.

In 2016, she edited and co-wrote What We Talk about When We Talk about Creative Writing, a collaborative exploration of teaching and academia with 32 contributors in more than a dozen conversation essays. In 2005, she edited Power and Identity in the Creative Writing Classroom, which was reviewed by Pedagogy in terms of creating a new paradigm for teaching creative writing at the college and university level. The reviewer found that by examining new ways to teach as presented in Leahy's book, creative writing professors can make better decisions about their own classrooms. In 2010, Leahy contributed to Does the Writing Workshop Still Work?, which was reviewed by Pedagogy and called "an enlightening read for both critics and supporters of the workshop." Her essays on teaching creative writing are included in Hippo Reads and The Handbook of Creative Writing, as well as critical work for Curator, The Journal of the Midwest MLA, The Journal of Creative Writing Studies, The Companion to the American Short Story, and the Encyclopedia of American Poetry: The Twentieth Century.

A native of Illinois, Leahy is the daughter of Mary Lee Leahy, whom the Chicago Tribune called "a pioneering lawyer," and Andrew Leahy. She holds an MA from Iowa State University, MFA in Poetry from the University of Maryland, and PhD from Ohio University.

== Work ==
Leahy's essays and poetry have appeared in 2Paragraphs, Air & Space Magazine, Airplane Reading, ArLiJo, The Atlantic, Barn Owl Review, Bellevue Literary Review, Coast Magazine, Crab Orchard Review, Dogwood, Drunken Boat, Dunes Review, Eclipse, Entropy, Fifth Wednesday Journal, The Huffington Post, Image, The Journal, Literary Hub, Literary Orphans, Minerva Rising, Motto, Nimrod, Ninth Letter, Oberon, OC Register, OZY, Parade, Passage North, Poets & Writers, PopSugar, Quarterly West, The Rumpus, Southern Humanities Review, South Florida Poetry, The Southern Review, Tinderbox, The Weeklings, Willawaw, and Zocalo Public Square, among others.

=== Nonfiction ===
- Leahy, Anna; Sparks, Lisa (2018). Conversing with Cancer: How to Ask Questions, Find and Share Information, and Make the Best Decisions. Peter Lang. ISBN 9781433133534.
- Leahy, Anna (2017). Tumor. Bloomsbury. ISBN 9781501323300.
- Leahy, Anna; Dechow, Douglas R. (2017). Generation Space: A Love Story. Stillhouse. ISBN 9780996981613.

=== Pedagogy ===
- Leahy, Anna (2016). What We Talk about When We Talk about Creative Writing. Multilingual Matters. ISBN 9781783096008.
- Leahy, Anna (2016). "Against Creative Writing Studies". Journal of Creative Writing Studies. 1 (1). RIT Scholar Works.
- Leahy, Anna (2013). "On Inclusivity in Creative Writing". Hippo Reads.
- Leahy, Anna (2010). "Who Wants To Be a Nerd? Or How Cognitive Science Changed My Teaching". New Writing: The International Journal for the Practice and Theory of Creative Writing. 7 (1). Taylor and Francis: 45–52.
- Leahy, Anna (2005). Power and Identity in the Creative Writing Classroom: The Authority Project. Multilingual Matters. ISBN 9781853598463.

=== Poetry ===
- Leahy, Anna (2017). Aperture. Shearsman Books. ISBN 9781848615168.
- Leahy, Anna (2016). Sharp Miracle (chapbook). Blue Lyra Press. ISBN 9780692598900.
- Leahy, Anna (2007). Constituents of Matter. Kent State University Press. ISBN 9780873389259.
- Leahy, Anna (2006). Turns About a Point (chapbook). Finishing Line Press. ISBN 9781599240831.
- Leahy, Anna (2000). Hagioscope (chapbook). Sow's Ear Press. ASIN B00125N46Y.

=== Scholarship ===
- Leahy, Anna; Dechow, Douglas (2006). "Keep 'Em Flying High: How American Air Museums Create and Foster Themes of the World War II Air War". Amsterdamer Beiträge zur neueren Germanistik (in German). 60. Amsterdam: Rodopi: 313.
- Leahy, Anna; Dechow, Douglas (2006). "Not Just the Hangars of World War II: American Aviation Museums and the Role of Memorial". Curator: The Museum Journal. 49 (4): 419–34. doi:10.1111/j.2151-6952.2006.tb00234.x.
