= Lucille Medwick Memorial Award =

The Lucille Medwick Memorial Award is given once a year to a member of the Poetry Society of America. It was "established by Maury Medwick in memory of his wife, the poet and editor, for an original poem in any form on a humanitarian theme."

Each winner receives a $500 prize.

== Winners ==
- 2025: Ina Cariño, Judge: Natalie Scenters-Zapico
- 2024: Cindy Juyoung Ok, Judge: Sandra Lim
- 2023: D.S. Waldman, Judge: Jennifer Foerster
- 2022: Allison Benis White, Judge: Cameron Awkward-Rich
- 2021: Devon Walker-Figueroa, Judge: Amit Majmudar
- 2020: Melissa Studdard, Judge: Ruth Ellen Kocher
- 2019: Cecily Parks, Judge: Rosa Alcalá Finalists: Michael Dumanis, M. Soledad Caballero
- 2018: Molly Spencer, Judge: Maggie Smith Finalists: Benjamin Paloff, Kevin Prufer
- 2017: Hadara Bar-Nadav, Judge: Francisco Aragón
- 2016: Kaveh Akbar, Judge: Yona Harvey
- 2015: Sandra Meek, Judge: Fady Joudah Finalists: Adam O. Davis, Sara Henning
- 2014: David Welch, Judge: Jericho Brown Finalists: Janet McAdams, G.C. Waldrop
- 2013: Gary Young, Judge: Patricia Smith Finalists: Bruce Bond, Diana Khoi Nguyen
- 2012: Suji Kwock Kim, Judge: Ilya Kaminsky, Finalist: Rebecca Morgan Frank
- 2011: Kerri Webster, Judge: Nikky Finney
- 2010: Sandra Stone, Judge: Juan Felipe Herrera
- 2009: Wayne Miller, Judge: Elizabeth Alexander
- 2008: Christina Pugh, Judge: Timothy Donnelly
- 2007: Wayne Miller, Judge: Tracy K. Smith
- 2006: Lynn Knight, Judge: Grace Schulman
- 2005: Wayne Miller, Judge: Vijay Seshadri
- 2004: Wayne Miller, Judge: Terrance Hayes
- 2003: Alan Michael Parker, Judge: Katha Pollitt
- 2002: Minne Bruce Pratt, Judge: Cornelius Eady
- 2001: Mary Jane Nealon

== See also ==
- Poetry Society of America
- List of American literary awards
- List of poetry awards
- List of years in poetry
