= Matthew Minicucci =

American writer and poet (born 1981)

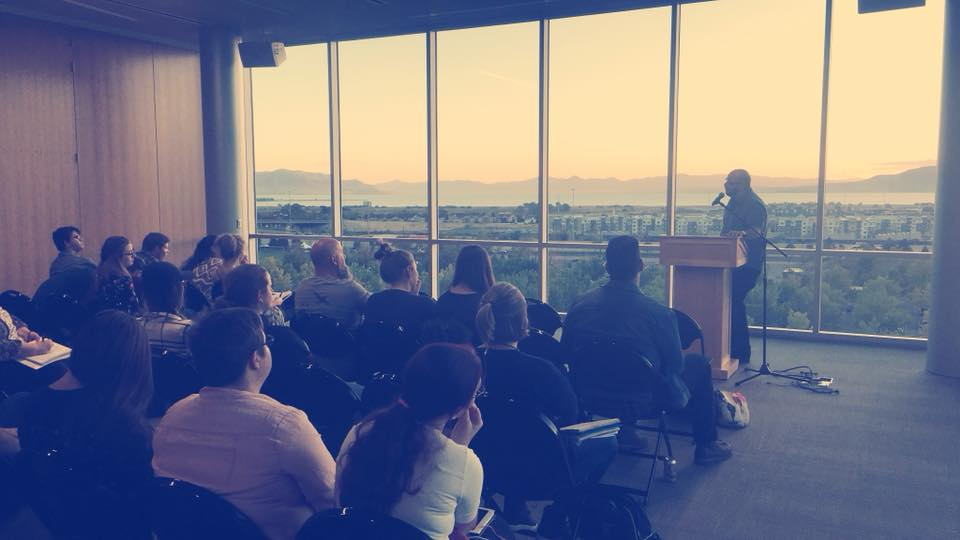
- Minicucci at the 2017 Utah Humanities Book Festival.
- Born: January 28, 1981 (age 45); Boston, Massachusetts, US
- Education: University of Massachusetts Amherst; University of Illinois at Urbana–Champaign
- Occupations: Poet, teacher
- Writing career
- Language: English, Greek (Attic and Homeric), Latin
- Notable awards: Oregon Book Award, Wick Poetry Prize
- Literary movement: New Formalism
- Website: matthewminicucci.com

Matthew Minicucci is an American writer and poet. His first full-length collection, Translation, won the 2015 Wick Poetry Prize. His second collection, Small Gods, was published in 2017 and won the 2019 Stafford/Hall Oregon Book Award in Poetry. Having received numerous fellowships and residencies, including with the National Park Service, the C. Hamilton Bailey Oregon Literary Fellowship, the Stanley P. Young Fellowship in Poetry from the Bread Loaf Writers' Conference, and the James Merrill House, Minicucci was named the 2019 Dartmouth College Poet-in-Residence at the Frost Place.

== Career ==
After completing a degree in Classical Literature and Languages, Minicucci pursued his MFA at the University of Illinois; he has trained with Brigit Pegeen Kelly, Tyehimba Jess, and A. Van Jordan. His chapbook, Reliquary, marshalls the Stations of the Cross to explore themes later positively received in the full-length Translation. The Kenyon Review remarked the book's ″attention to craft as well as its thematic concerns and narrative devices [invoke] ancient history and myth to make sense of the poet's own personal history of loss.″

In his citation for the Oregon Book Award, judge and 2019 Pulitzer-prize winner Forrest Gander remarked

The lexicon is inordinately rich, somehow both precise and lush. And the poems are insistently but never portentously philosophical, grounded as they are in bailing twine, bared teeth, baptismal tears. Disinterested in irony, softly-toned, Minicucci opens depths inside us that we can sense long after we’ve closed his book.

Minicucci's poetry, essays, fiction, and reviews have appeared in Alaska Quarterly Review, The Believer, The Cincinnati Review, Copper Nickel, the Gettysburg Review, Hayden's Ferry Review, The Massachusetts Review, Oregon Humanities magazine, Passages North, Pleiades, Poetry, Poetry Northwest, Salamander, Southern Indiana Review, The Southern Review, Tupelo Quarterly, the Virginia Quarterly Review, and West Branch, among others. It has also been featured on Verse Daily, Poetry Daily, and The Slowdown with Maggie Smith.

He serves as a member of the advisory board for Ninth Letter, and as senior poetry editor to Silk Road Review: A Literary Crossroads. Minicucci has taught writing at the University of Illinois at Urbana-Champaign, Millikin University, Pacific University, the University of Portland, and Linfield College. He is currently a senior fellow with the Blount Scholars Program at the University of Alabama.

== Bibliography ==
=== Books ===
- Dual: Poems. Acre Books / University of Cincinnati. 2023. ISBN 9781946724670.
- Small Gods: Poems. A Green Rose Book, New Issues Poetry & Prose / University of Chicago Press. 2017. ISBN 9781936970476.
- Translation: Poems. Kent State University Press. 2015. ISBN 9781606352625.
- Reliquary: Poems. Accents. 2013. ISBN 9781936628131.

=== Anthologies ===
- The Cumberland River Review: The First Five Years. Trevecca Nazarene University. 2018. ISBN 9780976629696.
- Booth X. Butler University Press. 2017. ISBN 9780990636441.
- Best New Poets 2014: 50 Poems from Emerging Writers. University of Virginia Press. 2015. ISBN 9780976629696.

=== Reviews ===
- Regular book reviews across genres for the "InReview". Pittsburgh Post-Gazette.
- "Our Lady of Perpetual Movement: review of Virgin by Analicia Sotelo". The Rumpus. June 22, 2018.
- "Intentions, Inquiries, and Impossible Tasks: review of Marvels of the Invisible by Jenny Molberg". The Rumpus. February 9, 2018.
- "Music Always About to Begin: review of Not on the Last Day, But the Very Last by Justin Boening". The Rumpus. March 17, 2017.
- "Don't Look Back You Said: review of The Eyes the Window by Marci Rae Johnson". Philadelphia Review of Books. Philadelphia, PA. March 10, 2014.
