= Leah Poole Osowski =

American poet

- Born: Massachusetts, U.S.
- Education: University of North Carolina at Wilmington (MFA)
- Occupations: Poet, editor
- Website: www.leahpooleosowski.com

Leah Poole Osowski is an American essayist and poet. Her first full-length poetry collection, hover over her, won the Wick Poetry Prize. Her second collection, Exceeds Us, won the Alma Book Award. Osowski's work has earned her fellowships from the Vermont Studio Center and Image’s Glen Workshop. Her poetry has been a finalist for awards including the National Poetry Series. In 2018, she was named the Penn State Altoona Emerging Writer-in-Residence.

== Biography ==
Osowski pursued her MFA at the University of North Carolina at Wilmington, where she studied under poets Malena Mörling, Sarah Messer, and Michael White. Her graduate thesis later became her debut collection, hover over her, which was chosen by Adrian Matejka for the Wick Poetry Prize.

Osowski's essays and poetry have appeared in The Georgia Review, The Southern Review, Ninth Letter, The Gettysburg Review, and The Cincinnati Review, among many others. She has been interviewed by The Massachusetts Review, The Southern Review, The Cincinnati Review and others.

Osowski has been a reader for literary journals such as Ecotone, New England Review, and Raleigh Review. In 2020, she became the poetry editor of Raleigh Review. She serves on the board of Ridgelines, a nonprofit that teaches language arts to under-heard populations in central Pennsylvania.

In August 2017, Osowski was awarded the Paul Mariani Fellowship to attend Image’s Glen Workshop. In March 2018, she was awarded a fellowship for the Vermont Studio Center. She served as the Penn State Altoona Emerging Writer-in-Residence during the fall of 2018.

In 2019, she was invited to return to her alma mater to present at the University of North Carolina at Wilmington's annual Writer's Week.

She was chosen for Pennsylvania State University's Shaver's Creek Environmental Center's Long-Term Ecological Reflections Project writing residency, which she served from 2019 to 2020.

In 2021, she read alongside writers Sabrina Orah Mark, Lee Upton, and others for Saturnalia Books's fundraiser reading. In 2022, Osowski's work was chosen by poet Todd F. Davis for Poetry Moment on WPSU (FM), a member of NPR.

Osowski's second poetry collection, Exceeds Us, won the Alma Book Award. The manuscript was also a finalist for the 2021 National Poetry Series.

== Bibliography ==
=== Poetry ===
- hover over her (Kent State University Press, September 2016). ISBN 978-1-60635-297-7
- Exceeds Us (Saturnalia Books, forthcoming).

=== Essays ===
- Shy Girl. Indiana Review. Summer 2017 Volume 39, Number 1.
- Link Analysis. Quarterly West. December 2016, Issue 89.
- Moonstone. Black Warrior Review. Spring/Summer 2014.
