= Ossia (poetry collection) =

2024 debut poetry collection by Jimin Seo

- Author: Jimin Seo
- Publisher: Changes Press
- Publication date: September 1, 2024
- Pages: 136
- Awards: The Changes Book Prize
- ISBN: 979-8988904267

Ossia (stylized in all caps) is a 2024 debut poetry collection by Jimin Seo, published by Changes Press. It was released following its selection by Louise Glück for the Changes Book Prize. Many of its poems are rendered in both English and Korean, as well as written in epistolary form toward to Richard Howard, Seo's mentor at Columbia University.

== Critical reception ==
Rosanna Young Oh, writing in the Los Angeles Review of Books, observed "formal originality and musicality" in Seo's aptly titled book after ossia, the musical concept of "an alternative passage played instead of the original." Oh argued that the book was "a performance of language rather than as a lyrical project" and that its virtues were vested in technical feats of sound, voice, texture on the page, similar to the accomplishments of other Korean American poets like Don Mee Choi and Theresa Hak Kyung Cha.

Preposition Mag lauded the book for how it pushed back against "a contemporary obsession with and fetishization of identity, a trend which would market certain more or less under-represented experiences for snack-like literary consumption," as well as Seo's demonstrations of language in "a remarkable debut" with only a slight "slippage into dissociation" and "non-sense."
