= Norma Farber First Book Award =

Poetry award

The Norma Farber First Book Award is given by the Poetry Society of America "for a first book of original poetry written by an American and published in either a hard or soft cover in a standard edition during the calendar year".

The award was established by the family and friends of the poet and children's book author Norma Farber. The award comes with a $500 prize.

== Winners ==
| Year | Winner | Title | Judge |
|---|---|---|---|
| 2026 | Esther Lin | Cold Thief Place | Maya C. Popa |
| 2025 | Jimin Seo | OSSIA | Phillip B. Williams |
| 2024 | Simon Shieh | Master | Rio Cortez |
| 2023 | Paul Hlava Ceballos | banana [ ] | Chase Berggrun |
| 2022 | Amanda Larson | Gut (Omnidawn) | Mark Bibbins |
| 2021 | Taylor Johnson | Inheritance | Francine J. Harris |
| 2020 | Zaina Alsous | A Theory of Birds | Matthew Shenoda |
| 2019 | Anna Maria Hong | Age of Glass | Geoffrey G. O'Brien |
| 2018 | Eve L. Ewing | Electric Arches | Elizabeth Macklin |
| 2017 | Vincent Toro | Stereo. Island. Mosaic. | Natalie Diaz |
| 2016 | Magdalena Zurawski | [Companion Animal] | Jennifer Moxley |
| 2015 | Cathy Linh Che | Split | Adrian Matejka |
| 2014 | r. erica doyle | proxy | Maggie Nelson |
| 2013 | Nick Twemlow | Palm Tree | Timothy Liu |
| 2012 | Emily Kendal Frey | The Grief Performance | Dana Levin |
| 2011 | John Beer | The Wasteland and Other Poems | Bin Ramke |
| 2010 | Scott Coffel | Toucans in the Arctic | Edward Hirsch |
| 2009 | Richard Deming | Let’s Not Call It Consequence | Martha Ronk |
| 2008 | Catherine Imbriglio | Parts of the Mass | Thylias Moss |
| 2007 | Kate Colby | Fruitlands | Rosmarie Waldrop |
| 2006 | Cammy Thomas | Cathedral of Wish | Medbh McGuckian |
| 2005 | Karen An-hwei Lee | In Medias Res | Cole Swensen |
| 2004 | Brenda Coultas | A Handmade Museum | Lyn Hejinian |
| 2003 | Sean Singer | Discography | Allen Grossman |
| 2002 | Jennifer Michael Hecht | The Next Ancient World | David Lehman |
| 2001 | V. Penelope Pelizzon | Nostos | August Kleinzahler |
| 2000 | Lisa Lubasch | How Many More of Them Are You? | John Yau |
| 1999 | Hettie Jones | Drive: Poems | Naomi Shihab Nye |
| 1998 | Rebecca Reynolds | Daughter of the Hangnail | Ann Lauterbach |
| 1997 | Susan Yuzna | Her Slender Dress | Michael Weaver |
| 1995 | Barbara Hamby | Delirium |
| 1994 | Sophie Cabot Black | The Misunderstanding of Nature |
| 1993 | Susan Wheeler | Bag O' Diamonds | James Tate |
| 1992 | Timothy Liu | Vox Angelica | Carolyn Forche |
| 1991 | Karl Kirchwey | A Wandering Island |

== See also ==
- American poetry
- List of poetry awards
- List of literary awards
- List of years in poetry
- List of years in literature
