= Dujie Tahat =

Dujie Tahat is a Filipino-Jordanian poet. They are the Seattle Civic Poet. They were long-listed for the 2020 PEN/Voelcker Award for Poetry.

== Biography ==
Tahat was born in the Philippines to a Jordanian father and Filipina mother, before moving immigrating to the United States. They worked for Civic Ventures.

They won a Poetry Society of America (PSA) Chapbook Fellowship. They are an editor at Moss, and critic at Poetry Northwest. They are cohosts of the The Poet Salon podcast.

Their work appeared in Poetry.

== Works ==
- Shibboleth (Fonograf Editions, 2027)
- Balikbayan (New Michigan Press, 2022)
- Here I Am O My God (Poetry Society of America, 2020)
- Salat (Tupelo Press, 2020)
