= Rebecca Reynolds (poet) =

American poet

- Born: Washington, D.C., U.S.
- Education: Vassar College; Rutgers University (MA); University of Michigan (MFA)
- Occupation: Poet
- Writing career
- Notable awards: Hopwood Award; Norma Farber First Book Award (1998)

Rebecca Reynolds is an American poet.

== Life ==
Reynolds was born in Washington, D.C., United States, in which city she also grew up. She graduated from Vassar College, Rutgers University (MA in English), and the University of Michigan (MFA in creative writing/poetry). Since 1991, she has worked as an administrator at Douglass Residential College, and has also taught Creative Writing at Rutgers University.

Stephen Burt calls her an elliptical poet. Her work has appeared in Quarterly West, Boston Review, Spoon River Poetry Review, Cimarron Review, Quarterly West, Verse, and other journals.

She lives in Highland Park, New Jersey.

== Awards ==
- Hopwood Award

== Works ==
=== Poetry books ===
- Daughter of the Hangnail. New Issues Press. 1997. ISBN 978-0-932826-56-5.
- The Bovine Two-Step. New Issues Press. 2002. ISBN 978-1-930974-22-7.
- Otherly. 42 Miles Press. 2025. ISBN 978-1-7328511-8-4.

=== Anthologies ===
- American Poetry: the Next Generation. Carnegie Mellon Press. 2000.
