= Marcus Wicker =

American poet (born 1984)

- Born: July 9, 1984 (age 42); Ann Arbor, Michigan, U.S.
- Education: Indiana University
- Occupations: Poet, professor
- Employer: University of Memphis
- Notable work: Maybe the Saddest Thing; Silencer
- Awards: Harvard Radcliffe Institute Fellowship; NEA Creative Writing Fellowship; National Poetry Series Prize; Pushcart Prize
- Website: www.marcuswicker.com

Marcus Wicker (born July 9, 1984) is an American poet. He is the author of the full-length poetry-collections Silencer—winner of the Society of Midland Authors Award and Arnold Adoff Award for New Voices—and Maybe the Saddest Thing, selected by D. A. Powell for the National Poetry Series. Wicker is the recipient of fellowships from the Harvard Radcliffe Institute for Advanced Studies, the National Endowment for the Arts, and the Poetry Foundation. His work has appeared in various literary and commercial publications including The Nation, The Atlantic, Oxford American, The New Republic, Ploughshares, Poetry, and elsewhere. He teaches creative writing in the MFA program at the University of Memphis.

== Early life and education ==
Wicker was born in Ann Arbor, Michigan, and grew up in Ypsilanti. He has described taking to writing at an early age, beginning with mystery stories and personal journals in elementary school and then encountering poetry thanks to his tenth grade English teacher who took his class to the National Youth Poetry Slam at the University of Michigan. Seeing students his own age perform their writing encouraged Wicker to pursue his own work. He earned an MFA from Indiana University in 2010 and completed a post-graduate fellowship at the Fine Arts Work Center in Provincetown the year after.

== Career ==
Wicker's debut collection Maybe the Saddest Thing won the 2011 National Poetry Series Prize, selected by D.A. Powell. The 79-page collection, published with Harper Perennial, was also a nominee for the NAACP Image Award for Literary Work - Poetry. Reviewing the book in Slate, Jonathan Farmer wrote, "In both sound and sense, Wicker nails the terrible courage of standing out and dignifies it with an abrupt austerity." In Muzzle Magazine, Kendra DeColo said the collection "celebrates the messy and uncomfortable," offering "Failure [as] a sacred contract, giving us permission to enter the poems as imperfect beings, to stumble as we question and interact with issues the poems explore."

In 2011, Wicker was a Ruth Lilly Fellow. He won a 2014 Pushcart Prize for his poem, "Interrupting Aubade Ending In Epiphany", originally published in the Southern Indiana Review (Spring 2012), and the Missouri Review's 2016 Miller Audio Prize Contest for his poem "Watch us Elocute", originally published in the Boston Review.

Wicker's second collection, Silencer, also an NAACP Image Award nominee, appeared with Houghton Mifflin Harcourt on September 5, 2017. Of Silencer, renowned critic Stephanie Burt writes, “Wicker makes witty yet serious, encyclopedically allusive work whose excitable energies and wide range of diction belie the gravity of their topics: structural injustice, familial loyalty, uneasy adulthood, and institutional racism.”

Wicker began teaching English at the University of Southern Indiana in 2012 and joined the creative writing faculty in the MFA program at the University of Memphis in 2017. He is currently the Mary I. Bunting Fellow at the Harvard Radcliffe Institute for Advanced Studies.

== Awards and honors ==
- 2023 — Harvard Radcliffe Institute for Advanced Study Fellowship
- 2021 — National Endowment for the Arts, Creative Writing Fellowship
- 2021 — Poetry Society of America Lyric Poetry Award
- 2020 — Tennessee Arts Commission Individual Artist Fellowship
- 2018 — Society of Midland Authors Award for Silencer
- 2018 — Arnold Adoff Poetry Award for New Voices for Silencer
- 2011 — Ruth Lilly Poetry Fellowship
- 2010 — Fine Arts Work Center Fellowship

== Bibliography ==
=== Poetry ===
Collections

- Silencer, Houghton Mifflin Harcourt, September 2017 ISBN 978-1328715548
- Maybe the Saddest Thing, Harper Perennial, October 2012 ISBN 978-0062191014

List of poems

- “Ars Poetica,” Academy of American Poets, 2017
- “Conjecture on the Stained-Glass Image of White Christ,” Poetry, December 2016
