= Wick Poetry Prize =

Tom and Stan Wick Poetry Prize
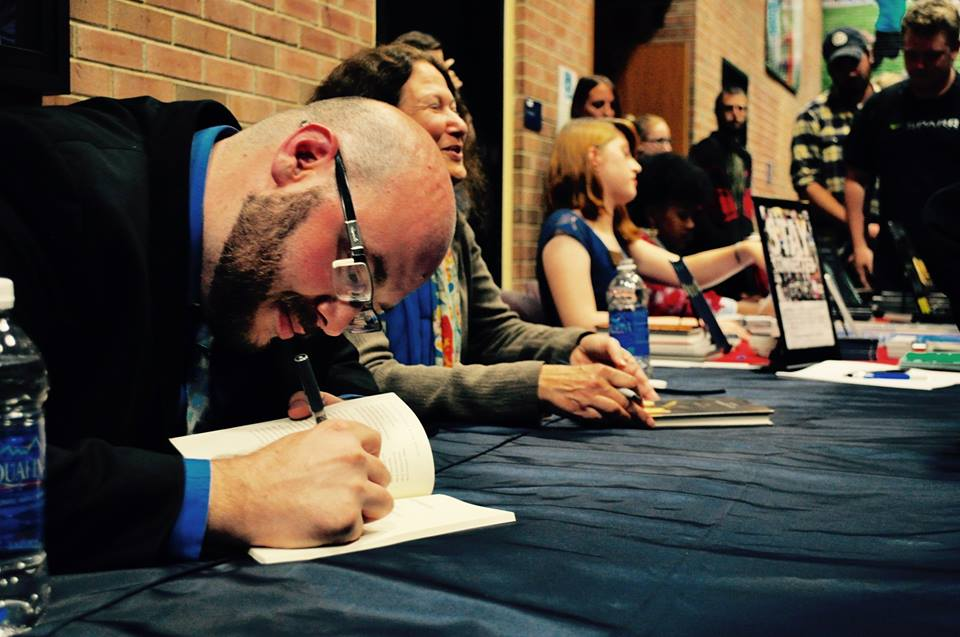
- Matthew Minicucci and Jane Hirshfield sign books after the 2015 Wick Poetry Prize reading event in Kent, Ohio.
- Awarded for: Literary excellence
- Country: United States
- Presented by: Wick Poetry Center, Kent State University
- First award: 1995
- Website: Kent.edu/wick

The Stan and Tom Wick Poetry Prize is offered annually to a previously-unpublished poet by the Wick Poetry Center, which is affiliated with Kent State University. Founded by Maggie Anderson and now administered by David Hassler, the prize awards the winner with $2,500 and publication of their first full-length book of poetry by the Kent State University Press. The winner spends a week in residence at the Wick Poetry Center, the 112-year-old home of faculty emeritus May Prentice, giving master classes to university students and community members, culminating in a reading giving together with the competition's judge on the Kent State campus.

== Recipients ==
2022: Sister Tongue by Farnaz Fatemi; Tracy K. Smith, Judge
2021: How Blood Works by Ellene Glenn Moore; Richard Blanco, Judge
2020: On This Side of the Desert by Alfredo Aguilar; Natalie Diaz, judge
2019: The Many Names for Mother by Julia Kolchinsky Dasbach; Ellen Bass, judge
2018: Fugue Figure by Michael McKee Green; Khaled Mattawa, judge
2017: Even Years by Christine Gosnay; Angie Estes, judge
2016: hover over her by Leah Poole Osowski; Adrian Matejka, judge
2015: Translation by Matthew Minicucci; Jane Hirshfield, judge
2014: The Spectral Wilderness by Oliver Baez Bendorf; Mark Doty, judge
2013: West by Carolyn Creedon; Edward Hirsch, judge
2012: The Dead Eat Everything by Michael Mlekoday; Dorianne Laux, judge
2011: The Local World by Mira Rosenthal; Maggie Anderson, judge
2010: Visible Heavens by Joanna Solfrian; Naomi Shihab Nye, judge
2009: The Infirmary by Edward Mincus; Stephen Dunn, judge
2008: Far From Algiers by Djelloul Marbook; Toi Derricotte, judge
2007: Constituents of Matter by Anna Leahy; Alberto Rios, judge
2006: Intaglio by Ariana-Sophia Kartsonis; Eleanor Wilner, judge
2005: Trying to Speak by Anele Rubin; Philip Levine, judge
2004: Rooms and Fields by Lee Peterson; Jean Valentine, judge
2003: The Drowned Girl by Eve Alexandra; C.K. Williams, judge
2002: Back Through Interruption by Kate Northrop; Lynn Emanuel, judge
2001: Paper Cathedrals by Morri Creech; Li-Young Lee, judge
2000: The Gospel of Barbeque by Honorée Fanonne Jeffers; Lucille Clifton, judge
1999: Beyond the Velvet Curtain by Karen Kovacik; Henry Taylor, judge
1998: The Apprentice of Fever by Richard Tayson; Marilyn Hacker, judge
1997: Intended Place by Rosemary Willey; Yusef Komunyakaa, judge
1996: Likely by Lisa Coffman; Alicia Suskin Ostriker, judge
1995: Already the World by Victoria Redel; Gerald Stern, judge
