= Vincent Toro =

Puerto Rican poet

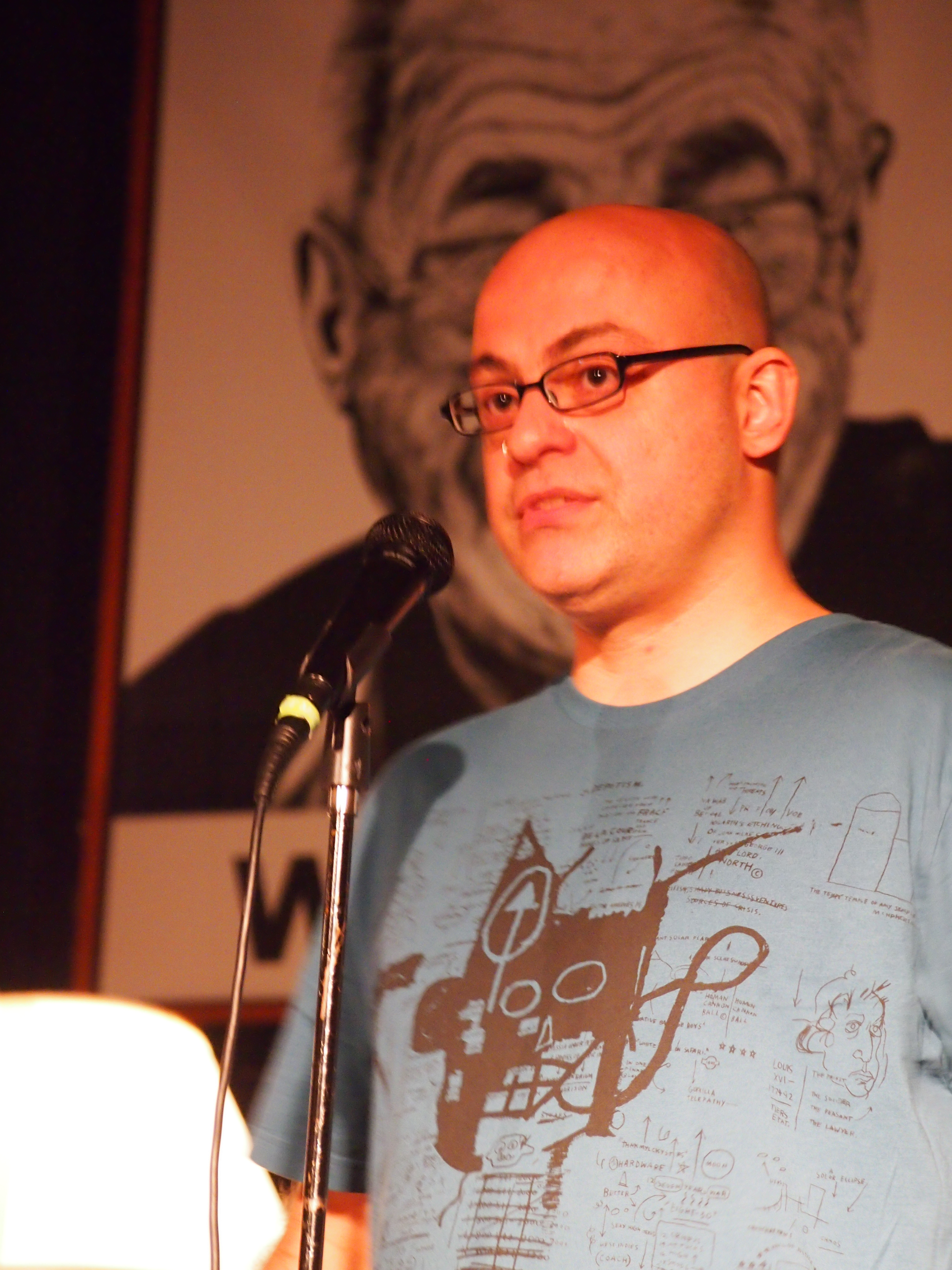
Vincent Toro

Vincent Toro is a Manhattan, NY born Puerto Rican decent teacher, poet, playwright, and director. His poetry is focused on the experience of people who cross the US-Mexico border and Latin-American people in general.

== Education ==
Vincent Toro attended Rutgers University where he received an MFA in poetry. Toro is also a contributing editor for the Kweli Literary Journal.

== Career ==
In addition to writing and directing, Toro is an educator. Since 2001, he has taught in communities of color. He also spent this time writing about issues that are prevalent in these communities. As of 2018, he teaches at Bronx Community College as well as being a writing liaison at The Cooper Union Saturday Program. From 2006 to 2011, Toro was Theater Arts Director at the Guadalupe Cultural Arts Center. He is a member of the Macondo Writer's Foundation and serves on the board of GlobalWrites, a non-profit dedicated to promoting literacy through integration of technology and performing arts in schools. Throughout the U.S., Toro teaches at CUNY'’s Bronx Community College and is a poet in the schools for the Geraldine R. Dodge Poetry Foundation and the Dreamyard Project. Toro also teaches at Rider University.

== Plays ==
Vincent Toro's plays have been shown at many theatres in New York including Teatro La Tea, Repertorio Español, and INTAR. They have also been shown in Texas at the Guadalupe Cultural Arts Center and The San Pedro Playhouse.

== Latino contributions ==
Motivation

Toro's experimentation in his poetry draws from afrofuturism, Italian futurism, and the Ultraísmo social and literary movements. Toro borrows ideas of liberation and linguistic boldness from these genres, and applies them in a Latinx context to redefine the Latino identity and experience. Toro's editing process involves actively reimagining his poetry, focusing on intent and soul to keep the original impulse of a poem intact.

Publications

Toro has written two books, Stereo.Island.Mosaic. and Tertulia. He has been featured in many journals, including Anomaly Literary Journal, BOAAT Journal, Kweli Journal, The Texas Review, The Buenos Aires Review, Paterson Literary Review, and San Antonio Express-News, and Duende Literary Journal. Toro's poems can also be found in the Cream City Review's 39th publication and his work is discussed in the Chiricú Journal: Latina/o Literatures, Arts, and Cultures as well. Additional works in which his poems have been published include Rattapallax, Bordersenses, Really System, Five Quarterly, Codex, and The Waiting Room Reader 2. He has also been published in multiple anthologies, including CHORUS by Saul Williams, Best American Experimental Writing 2015 (Wesleyan University Press, 2016), Coloring Book: An Anthology of Multicultural Poems and Stories (Rattlecat Press, 2004), and Misrepresented People: Poetic Responses to Trump's America (NYQ Books, 2018).

Themes

In poems like "Guanín", “DREAMcatcher”, “Human Instamatic”, and “Sleep Dealer”, Toro uses pessimism to critique political thought as well as the limits placed on Latino communities, whether those be ideological or physical, through his common themes of separation seen literarily or in his formatting. In “Guanín”, he reclaims Puerto Rican history of nobility, expressing limitations as the edges of the island. In “DREAMcatcher” he is critical of the limits that are put on the “illegal” human, especially those involved in the DREAM Act, which come about as rejections of the immigrants body and way of living. In “Sleep Dealer”, Toro focuses on the border crossing itself and the technological component of crossing a bridge between two worlds and the existence within one of those worlds with inspiration from Alex Rivera's Sleep Dealer. “Guanín” is also consistent with the feelings of a beautiful land now tainted with materialistic and beauty, aesthetic focus that “Human Instamatic” expresses in its criticism of the concrete jungle, the slums, and the drug use, a poem inspired by Martin Wong's depictions of the urban setting.

== Awards ==
He received the San Antonio's November 2008 artist of the month, was a recipient of an artist residency at The Atlantic Center for the Arts in 2001, and in 2004 was a finalist for the Allen Ginsberg Poetry Prize. Vincent Toro won the 2014 Poet's House Emerging Poet's Fellowship and the 2014 New York Foundation for the Arts Fellowship in Poetry. For his book Stereo.Island.Mosaic, Toro won the Sawtooth Poetry Prize by Ahsahta Press in 2015, and The Poetry Society of America's Norma Farber First Book Award in 2017. In 2018, he also received Naropa University's SWP Amiri Baraka Scholarship. His play “21” won the Met Life Nuestras Voces Playwriting Award in 2018 and was staged at the Spanish Repertory Theater. During his tenure there, he won The San Antonio Theater Councils Golden Globe for Direction of a Drama for his staging of Suzan Lori Park's Topdog/Underdog.
