= Gary Young (poet) =

American poet

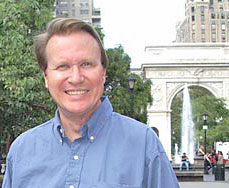
- Gary at Washington Square in 2009
- Born: 1951 (age 74–75)
- Education: University of California Santa Cruz; University of California, Irvine
- Occupations: Poet, printer, book artist
- Children: 2
- Writing career
- Genre: Poetry

Gary Eugene Young (born 1951) is an American poet, printer and book artist. In 2010, he was named the first ever Poet Laureate of Santa Cruz County.

== Life ==
He graduated from University of California Santa Cruz and University of California, Irvine, with an M.F.A.

His work has appeared in Poetry, Antaeus, The American Poetry Review, The Kenyon Review, Montserrat Review, ZYZZYVA.

In 1975, he founded Greenhouse Review Press. His print work is represented in numerous collections, including the Museum of Modern Art, the Victoria and Albert Museum, and The Getty Center for the Arts.

His archive is held at Brown University.

He teaches at the University of California Santa Cruz, and has lived near Santa Cruz for thirty years, with his wife and two sons.

In 2012, Young and fellow poet Christopher Buckley published One for the Money: The Sentence as a Poetic Form, A Poetry Workshop Handbook and Anthology through Lynx House Press.

== Awards ==
- 2009 Shelley Memorial Award
- National Endowment for the Humanities
- the Vogelstein Foundation
- George Bogin Memorial Award
- the California Arts Council
- two fellowship grants from the National Endowment for the Arts
- Pushcart Prize
- James D. Phelan Award for The Dream of a Moral Life
- William Carlos Williams Award of the Poetry Society of America, No Other Life
- Peregrine Smith Poetry Prize, Braver Deeds
- first poet laureate, City of [Santa Cruz], CA
- 2013 Lucille Medwick Memorial Award of the Poetry Society of America
- 2017 Lexi Rudnitsky Editor’s Choice Award for That's What I Thought

== Works ==
=== Poetry ===
- Hands: Poems. Illuminati. 1979. ISBN 978-0-89807-005-7.
- The Dream of a Moral Life. Copper Beech Press. 1990. ISBN 978-0-914278-56-6.
- Days: Poems. Silverfish Review Press. 1997. ISBN 978-1-878851-08-6.
- Braver Deeds: Poems. Gibbs Smith. 1999. ISBN 978-0-87905-866-1.
- No Harm Done: Poems and Woodcuts. Sutton Hoo Press. 2004.
- No Other Life. Heyday Books. 2005. ISBN 978-1-59714-004-1.
- Pleasure. Heyday Books. 2006. ISBN 978-1-59714-023-2.
- New and Selected Poems, White Pine Press.
- Adversary. Miramar Editions. 2017.
- That's What I Thought: Poems. Persea Books. 2018. ISBN 978-0-89255-494-2.

=== Editor ===
- The Geography of Home: California's Poetry of Place. Heyday Books. 1999. ISBN 978-1-890771-19-5.
- Bear Flag Republic: Prose Poems and Poetics from California. Greenhouse Review Press/Alcatraz Editions. 2008. ISBN 978-0-9655239-4-3.
