= Jimin Seo =

American poet

- Education: Columbia University (MFA)
- Occupation: Poet
- Notable work: Ossia
- Awards: The Changes Book Prize

Jimin Seo (Korean: 서지민) is an American poet. His debut poetry collection, Ossia, was selected by Louise Glück for the Changes Press Book prize and subsequently published by Changes Press in 2024.

== Early life and education ==
Seo grew up in Seoul, South Korea, and moved to Jacksonville, Florida at the age of eight.

Seo graduated from Columbia University with an MFA in 2010. There, he took one semester of classes with the poet Richard Howard and then became his assistant.

== Career ==
Following the death of his mother in 2013, Seo struggled to continue writing both about her and other subjects: "I tried to choose other subjects after she died, but they lacked intent and intensity. When I did write about her, it was hackneyed." He also encountered difficulties pertaining to translation between the English and Korean languages. Seo then asked Howard for advice on writer's block, to which Howard said "there was no such thing—it just meant I didn’t want to do it. And I didn't. He gave me permission to stop. Granted, it frustrated Richard terribly."

Later, during the COVID-19 pandemic, Seo began to write poetry again—both English poems and their subsequent Korean translations, which "magically worked." In 2024, Seo's manuscript for Ossia, filled with epistolary poems dedicated to Howard, was selected by Louise Glück for the Changes Press Book prize, after which it was published by Changes Press. In 2025, Ossia was recognized by the Academy of American Poets as the winner of the Norma Farber First Book Award.

== Bibliography ==
=== Poetry ===
- Ossia, Changes Press, 2024
