= Moikom Zeqo =

Moikom Zeqo (1949–2020) was an Albanian poet.

== Biography ==
He was born in Durrës. A prolific writer, he published more than 60 collections of poetry in his lifetime. He was also active in many other genres, including fiction, children’s literature and history. In total, he is thought to have published over a hundred books.

He served as minister of culture in the Albanian government in the early 1990s. He also held a number of other bureaucratic and administrative posts. He died in Tirana in 2020.

His work has been translated into English by the American poet Wayne Miller. Miller's rendering of Zeqo's collection Zodiac (2015) was a finalist for the PEN Center USA Award in Translation.
