= Susan Yuzna =

American poet and professor

- Education: University of Iowa; University of Montana
- Occupation: Writer
- Writing career
- Language: English
- Notable work: Her Slender Dress (1996)

Susan Yuzna is an American poet and professor.

== Life ==
Yuzna earned a B.A. in English from the University of Iowa, and an M.F.A. in creative writing from the University of Montana. She has been a resident at several artist colonies, including Yaddo, and MacDowell. She lives in Minneapolis, Minnesota.

== Awards ==
- Bush Artist Fellowship
- Richard Hugo Memorial Poetry Scholarship
- Her Slender Dress, won the Akron Poetry Prize and the Norma Farber First Book Award from the Poetry Society of America.

== Works ==
- "Lake Winnibigoshish". Ploughshares. Spring 1994. Archived from the original on 19 May 2003.
- "The Great Divide". The Antioch Review. Summer 1994.

=== Poetry Books ===
- Pale Bird, Sprouting Fire. University of Akron Press. 2000. ISBN 978-1-884836-62-6.
- Her Slender Dress. University of Akron Press. 1996. ISBN 978-1-884836-23-7.
- Burning the Fake Woman: Poems. GreenTower Press. 1996. ISBN 978-1-887240-01-7.
