= Rusty Morrison =

American poet and publisher (born 1956)

- Born: July 12, 1956 (age 69)
- Education: Mills College (B.A.); Saint Mary's College of California (M.F.A.); California State University, San Francisco (M.A.)
- Occupations: Poet; publisher

Rusty Morrison (born July 12, 1956) is an American poet and publisher. She received a BA in English from Mills College in Oakland, California, an MFA in Creative Writing (Poetry) from Saint Mary's College of California in Moraga, California, and an MA in Education from California State University, San Francisco. She has taught in the MFA program at the University of San Francisco and was Poet in Residence at Saint Mary’s College in 2009. She has also served as a visiting poet at a number of colleges and universities, including the University of Redlands, the University of Arizona, Boise State University, Marylhurst University, and Millikin University. In 2001, Morrison and her husband, Ken Keegan, founded Omnidawn Publishing in Richmond, California, and continue to work as co-publishers. She contracted Hepatitis C in her twenties but, like most people diagnosed with this disease, did not experience symptoms for several years. Since then, a focus on issues relating to disability has developed as an area of interest in her writing.

== Honors and awards ==
Each year links to its corresponding "[year] in poetry" article:

- 2022: Adelle Foley Award from PEN Oakland
- 2012: Fellowship Award for a four-week Residency at the Vermont Studio Center
- 2010: Dorset Prize, Tupelo Press, selected by Jane Hirshfield, for After Urgency
- 2009: Poet in Residence, MFA in Creative Writing Program, Saint Mary’s College, Spring 2009
- 2009: George Bogin Memorial Award, Poetry Society of America, selected by John Yau
- 2009: Northern California Book Award for Poetry (for the true keeps calm biding its story)
- 2008: James Laughlin Award, Academy of American Poets, selected by Rae Armantrout, Claudia Rankine, and Bruce Smith (for the true keeps calm biding its story)
- 2007: Sawtooth Poetry Prize, Ahsahta Press, Boise State University, Idaho, selected by Peter Gizzi (for the true keeps calm biding its story)
- 2007: Alice Di Castagnola Memorial Award, Poetry Society of America, selected by Susan Howe (for manuscript in progress: the true keeps calm biding its story)
- 2006: Cecil Hemley Memorial Award, Poetry Society of America, selected by Cal Bedient
- 2004: Colorado Prize for Poetry, The Center for Literary Publishing, Colorado State University, selected by Forrest Gander (for Whethering)
- 2003: Robert H. Winner Award, Poetry Society of America, selected by Ron Padgett
- 2002: Lori & Deke Hunter Fellowship (five week residency), Djerassi Resident Artists Program

== Published works ==
=== Full-length poetry collections ===
Each year links to its corresponding "[year] in poetry" article:

- 2014: Beyond the Chain Link. Ahsahta Press. February 1, 2014. ISBN 978-1934103463.
- 2012: After Urgency. Tupelo Press. April 30, 2012. ISBN 978-1932195415.
- 2011: Book of the Given. Noemi Press. April 30, 2012. ISBN 978-1934819098.
- 2008: the true keeps calm biding its story. Ahsahta Press. January 1, 2008. ISBN 978-0-916272-98-2.
- 2004: Whethering. Center for Literary Publishing, Colorado State University. 2004. ISBN 978-1-885635-07-5.

=== Chapbook collections ===
- 2011: Book of the Given. Noemi Press. 2011. ISBN 978-1-934819-09-8.

=== Periodicals and anthologies ===
Morrison's work has been included in an anthology for the literary study of disability, titled Beauty is a Verb. Morrison’s poems have also appeared in literary journals and magazines including American Poetry Review, Boston Review, Chicago Review, Colorado Review, Gulf Coast, Lana Turner, New American Writing, Pleiades, Verse, and VOLT. Her critical writings and creative nonfictions have been published in journals including Chicago Review, Denver Quarterly, Poetry Flash, Verse, and in the anthology One Word: Contemporary Writers on the Words They Love or Loathe (Sarabande 2010).
