= Althea Urn =

American writer

Althea Urn was the pen name of Consuelo Urisarri Ford (c. 1901 – November 11, 1969), an American writer. She was married to artist Ellsworth Ford, the son of financier Simeon Ford and Julia Ellsworth Ford, a socialite and author.

She is best known for her novels, especially The Head of Monsier M. (1961, Crown). Her will established the Lyric Poetry Award.

Kirkus Reviews said of her "(presumably) first novel" Five Miles from Candia (1959, Holt), "The author has a knack for scenic descriptions and a useful collection of facts about the customs and decor surrounding the life of royalty in ancient Crete, but the characters, with their highly predictable emotions and actions, are robots, developed according to the most obvious rules of lust."
