= Richard Deming =

American poet and art critic

Richard Deming is the Director of Creative Writing and a Senior Lecturer in English at Yale University, where he has taught since 2002.

An American poet, theorist, and art critic, he is the author of five books: three books of criticism – Listening on All Sides: Toward an Emersonian Ethics of Reading (Stanford University Press, 2008), Art of the Ordinary: The Everyday Domain of Art, Film, Philosophy, and Poetry (Cornell University Press, 2018), and Orson Welles's Touch of Evil (British Film Institute/Bloomsbury, forthcoming) – as well as two collections of poems, Let's Not Call it Consequence (Shearsman Books, 2008) and Day for Night (Shearsman, 2016).

He has also published essays in the collections Looking at Robert Gardner: Essays on His Films and Career (eds. William Rothman and Charles Warren, SUNY Press, 2016), A Power to Translate the World: New Essays on Emerson and International Culture (ed. Ricardo Miguel Alfonso, University Press of New England, 2015), Philosophy and the Films of Charlie Kaufman (ed. David LaRocca, University of Kentucky Press, 2011), Frank O'Hara Now: New Essays on the New York Poet (eds. Robert Hampton and Will Montgomery, Liverpool University Press, 2010), Ronald Johnson: Life and Works (eds. Eric Selinger and Joel Bettridge, Orono: National Poetry Foundation Press, 2008), and I Have Imagined a Center // Wilder than This Region: Essays on Susan Howe (Ed. Sarah Campbell, Cuneiform Press, 2007).

Deming is a member of the editorial boards of Evental Aesthetics and the Yale Review, and has published essays and reviews in Artforum, Framework: The Journal of Cinema and Media, Poetics Today, Notre Dame Review, et al., while his poems have appeared in such publications as Sulfur, Field, Indiana Review, and The Nation, as well as the collection Great American Prose Poems: From Poe to the Present. Deming has also been featured on episodes of the podcasts This is Not a Pipe, Poemtalk, and First Draft: A Dialogue on Writing. His most recent book, This Exquisite Loneliness: What Loners, Outcasts, and the Misunderstood Can Teach Us About Creativity, received enthusiastic reviews in The American Scholar, and Psychology Today, and was excerpted in The Paris Review.

== Life ==
Deming graduated from the University at Buffalo, where he studied with Robert Creeley, Charles Bernstein and Susan Howe, earning a Ph.D with Distinction in American Literature and Poetics in 2003.

He is married to the poet Nancy Kuhl; together, they edit the New Haven-based Phylum Press.

He currently teaches at Yale University, where he is also the Director of Creative Writing; in the past, he has taught at Wesleyan University.

== Awards ==
- 2009 Norma Farber First Book Award, Let's Not Call It Consequence
- 2012 John P. Birkelund Berlin Prize in the Humanities and Fellow at the American Academy in Berlin for Spring 2012
- 2017 Writer-in-Residence, Gloucester Writers Center.

== Works ==
=== Poetry ===
- Let's Not Call It Consequence. Shearsman Books. 2008. ISBN 978-1-905700-66-0.
- Day for Night. Shearsman Books. 2016. ISBN 978-1-848614-85-7.
- "From Some Elsewhere". Free Verse. Spring 2006.
- "Film Threat". The Nation. October 22, 2008.
- "Shall I Read from the History of the Battle of Thermopylae?; After Kurosawa". Conjunctions.
- "Knock Knock". Counterpath Press. Archived from the original on 2009-01-06.

=== Criticism ===
- Listening on All Sides: Toward an Emersonian Ethics of Reading. Stanford University Press. 2008. ISBN 978-0-804757-38-6.
- Art of the Ordinary: the Everyday Domain of Art, Film, Philosophy, and Poetry. Cornell University Press. 2018. ISBN 978-1-501720-14-7.
- Orson Welles's Touch of Evil. British Film Institute/Bloomsbury. May 2020. ISBN 978-1-844579-49-5.
- This Exquisite Loneliness: What Loners, Outcasts, and the Misunderstood Can Teach Us About Creativity. Penguin Random House. 2023. ISBN 978-0-593492-51-2.
