= Brenda Coultas =

American poet

- Education: Naropa University
- Occupation: Poet
- Writing career
- Notable awards: Norma Farber First Book Award (2004)

Brenda Coultas is an American poet.

== Life ==
She was raised in Indiana, often working odd jobs such as welding.

She graduated from Naropa University, studying with Anne Waldman and Allen Ginsberg. Coultas also taught at Naropa University.

She moved to New York City in 1994. With Eleni Sikelianos, she worked at the Poetry Project in NYC, edited the Poetry Project Newsletter.

In 2003, she was a visiting poet at Long Island University. She lives in the Bowery.

Her work has also been published Brooklyn Rail, Trickhouse, the Denver Review, and in two collections: An Anthology of New (American) Poets (Talisman 1996), and conjunctions 35 "American Poetry: States of the Art" (Fall 2000).

== Awards ==
- 2004 Norma Farber First Book Award, A Handmade Museum
- Greenwald grant from the Academy of American Poets
- 2005 New York Foundation for the Arts (NYFA)
- Lower Manhattan Cultural Council artist-in-residence.

== Work ==
- "The Bluegrass State". Fascile. Winter 2005–2006 (two). Archived from the original on 2008-10-06.
- "The Rat and The Flowerpot". Pom2. 2001. ISSN 1536-5808.
- "The Diary of Found Foods". Trickhouse. 2. Fall 2008.
- "Elementary Principles at Seventy-Two". Poetry Society of America. Archived from the original on 2008-07-05.
- "from The Bowery Project". Tool Magazine (1).

=== Poetry ===
- Early Films. Rodent Press. 1996. ISBN 978-1-887289-15-3.
- The Bowery Project. Leroy Chapbook Series. 2003. ISBN 978-99909-0-955-5.
- A Handmade Museum. Coffee House Press. 2003. ISBN 978-1-56689-143-1.
- The marvelous bones of time: excavations and explanations : poetry. Coffee House Press. 2007. ISBN 978-1-56689-204-9.

=== Anthologies ===
- Rosamond S. King, ed. (2004). Voices of the city: Newark reads poetry 2004. Hanging Loose Press. ISBN 978-1-931236-42-3.
- Rattapallax. Repossessed Head Press. 2003.
- Mary Burger, ed. (2006). An apparent event: a Second Story Books anthology. 2nd Story Books.
