= Karen An-hwei Lee =

American poet (born 1973)

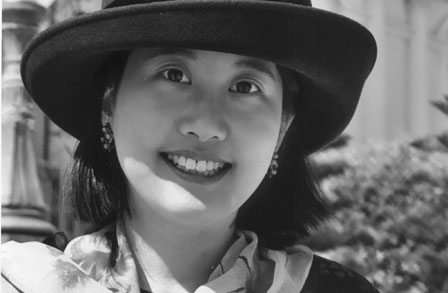
- Born: 1973 (age 52–53)
- Education: Brown University; University of California, Berkeley
- Occupations: Poet and novelist
- Writing career
- Genre: Poetry

Karen An-hwei Lee (born 1973) is an American poet and novelist.

== Life ==
Born in 1973, and raised in Massachusetts, Lee is a Chinese American poet, translator, and critic. She earned an M.F.A. in creative writing from Brown University and a Ph.D. in literature from the University of California, Berkeley. A former resident writing fellow at the MacDowell Colony for the Arts in Peterborough, New Hampshire and the Millay Colony for the Arts in Austerlitz, New York, Lee resided in Santa Ana, California. She became vice provost for Point Loma Nazarene University in 2016. In 2020, she became provost for Wheaton College.

Her first poetry book, In Medias Res: a primer of experience in approximate alphabetical order, was selected by poet Heather McHugh and published by Sarabande Books in 2004. Lee received six Pushcart Prize nominations, a National Endowment for the Arts Grant, the Poetry Society of America's Norma Farber First Book Award, the Kathryn A. Morton Prize for Poetry from Sarabande Books, and the July Open sponsored by Tupelo Press.

Her poetry and fiction has appeared in Greensboro Review, Prairie Schooner, Columbia Poetry Review, and a number of other publications. She is the author of a chapbook, God's One Hundred Promises (Swan Scythe Press, 2002), and additional full-length poetry collections, including Ardor (Tupelo Press, 2008) and Phyla of Joy: Poems (Tupelo Press, 2012). In 2017, Ellipsis Press published her first novella, Sonata in K.

== Awards ==
- 2019 Big Other Book Award for Fiction
- 2005 National Endowment for the Arts Literature Grant
- 2004 Poetry Society of America's Norma Farber First Book Award.
- 2004 Kathryn A. Morton Prize for Poetry, Sarabande Books
- 2002 Swan Scythe Press Prize
- Eisner Prize, University of California, Berkeley
- Yoshiko Uchida Foundation Fellowship
- Beinecke Foundation Fellowship
- John Hawkes Prize, Brown University
- Glenna Luschei Prairie Schooner Award
- Catherine Doctorow Prize for novel Marimo, Mon Amour

== Works ==
- "Falling Leaves Return to Roots". Spoon River Poetry Review. XXVII (1). Winter–Spring 2003. Archived from the original on 2009-05-08.
- "Meditation on a Cenote". Emprise Review. 8. April–May 2008.
- "Third Letter: Resilience". Swarthmore Review (1). Spring 2008.

=== Poetry books ===
- Women at the Well (MFA). Brown University. 1997. OCLC 40394616.
- God's One Hundred Promises. Swan Scythe Press. 2002. ISBN 978-1-930454-15-6.
- In Medias Res. Sarabande Books. 2004. ISBN 978-1-932511-07-9.
- Ardor. Tupelo Press. 2008. ISBN 978-1-932195-69-9.
- Phyla of Joy: Poems. Tupelo Press. 2012. ISBN 978-1-932195-14-9.
- The Beautiful Immunity. Tupelo Press. 2024. ISBN 978-1-961209-07-7
- Rose is a Verb: Neo-Georgics. Slant Books. 2021. ISBN 978-1-63982-091-7
- Duress. Cascade Books. 2022. ISBN 978-1-6667-3788-2

=== Nonfiction books ===
- Anglophone Literatures in the Asian Diaspora: Literary Transnationalism and Translingual Migrations. Cambria Press. 2013. ISBN 9781604978605.

=== Fiction books ===
- The Maze of Transparencies. Ellipsis Press. 2019. ISBN 978-1-940400-09-9
- Love Chronicles of the Octopodes. Ellipsis Press. 2023. ISBN 978-1-940400-10-5
- Sonata in K, Ellipsis Press. 2017. ISBN 978-1-940400-08-2
- Souvenirs. Baobab Press. 2022. ISBN 978-1-936097-41-8
- Beautiful Immunity. Tupelo Press. 2024. ISBN 978-1-961209-07-7
- Marimo, Mon Amour. Fiction Collective 2. 2026. ISBN 978-1-57366-218-5
