= Allison Benis White =

American poet

Alison Benis White is an American poet.

White is the author of Self-Portrait with Crayon, which was selected by poet Robert Hill Long as the winner of the 2008 Cleveland State University Poetry Center First Book Prize. Her second manuscript, Small Porcelain Head, was selected for the 2011 Four Way Books Levis Prize by poet Claudia Rankine. Her poems have appeared in journals such as The American Poetry Review, The Iowa Review, Pleiades, and Ploughshares. She has received the Indiana Review Poetry Prize, the Bernice Slote Award from Prairie Schooner, the Lucille Medwick Award, and a Writers Exchange Award from Poets & Writers. She has also been recognized with a Walter E. Dakin Fellowship to the Sewanee Writer's Conference and an Emerging Writer Fellowship from the Writer's Center. White received her M.F.A. from the University of California, Irvine.
