= Catherine Imbriglio =

American poet

- Born: Rhode Island, U.S.
- Education: Regis College; Boston College; Brown University (MA, PhD)
- Occupation: Poet
- Writing career
- Notable awards: Norma Farber First Book Award (2008)

Catherine Imbriglio is an American poet.

== Life ==
Catherine was born and lives in Rhode Island. She graduated from Regis College, Boston College, Brown University, M.A. (creative writing), and Ph.D. 1995. She teaches at Brown University.

Her work has appeared in American Letters & Commentary, Caliban, Center: A Journal of the Literary Arts, Conjunctions, Contemporary Literature, Denver Quarterly, Epoch, First Intensity, Indiana Review, New American Writing, No: A Journal of the Arts, Pleiades, WebConjunctions.

== Awards ==
- 2008 Norma Farber First Book Award Parts of the Mass
- Untermeyer fellowship in poetry
- merit award in poetry from the RI State Council on the Arts
- Brown University UCS award for excellence in teaching.

== Work ==
- "Loop the Loop Intimacy; To the Letter Intimacy". Conjunctions. Archived from the original on 2011-07-21.

=== Poetry ===
- Parts of the Mass. Burning Deck. 2007. ISBN 978-1-886224-81-0.

Intimacy. Center for Literary Publishing. 2013. ISBN 978-1-885635-33-4.

=== Anthologies ===
- The Iowa Anthology of New American Poetries, ed. Reginald Shepherd (University of Iowa Press, 2004).
