= Sean Singer =

American poet (born 1974)

- Born: 1974 (age 51–52); Guadalajara, Mexico
- Education: Indiana University Bloomington; Washington University in St. Louis; Rutgers University–Newark
- Writing career
- Genre: Poetry

Sean Singer (born 1974 in Guadalajara, Mexico) is an American poet. His book Discography won the Yale Series of Younger Poets Competition and the Norma Farber First Book Award in 2001. His second book Honey & Smoke was published by Eyewear Publishing in 2015. His third book, Today in the Taxi, was published by Tupelo Press in 2022.

== Life ==
He graduated from Indiana University Bloomington in 1997 and from Washington University in St. Louis in 1999. He lives in New York City. He maintains a daily newsletter on thinking through poetry called The Sharpener. He received a Ph.D. from Rutgers University–Newark in 2013.

== Published works ==
- Sean Singer (2002). Discography. Yale University Press. ISBN 978-0300093629. "Sean Singer."
- Honey & smoke London : Eyewear Publishing Ltd, 2015. ISBN 978-1908998439, OCLC 914297208
