= Kevin Prufer =

American poet (born 1969)

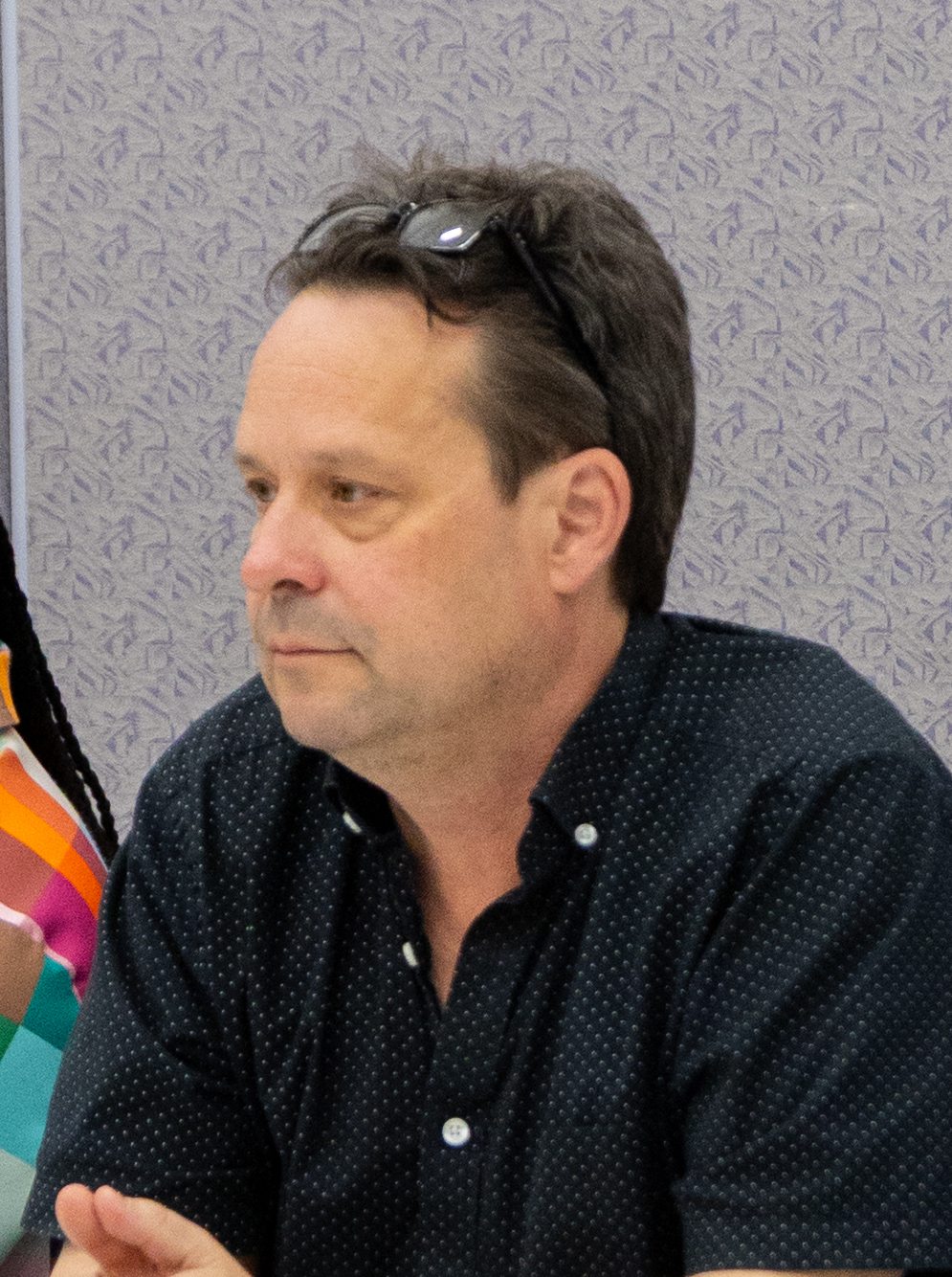
- Prufer at AWP 2025
- Born: 1969 (age 56–57); Cleveland, Ohio, U.S.
- Education: Wesleyan University, Hollins University; Washington University in St. Louis
- Writing career
- Language: English
- Genre: Poetry
- Website: www.kevinprufer.com

Kevin D. Prufer (born 1969 in Cleveland, Ohio) is an American poet, novelist, academic, editor, and essayist. He is Professor of English in the Creative Writing Program at the University of Houston.

== Life ==
Prufer graduated from Western Reserve Academy in 1988. He received a B.A. at Wesleyan University and an M.A. at the Hollins University Writing Program. He went on to earn an MFA at Washington University in St. Louis. He is currently Professor of English in the Creative Writing Program at the University of Houston and Editor-at-Large of Pleiades: A Journal of New Writing, Associate Editor of American Book Review, Co-Curator of the Unsung Masters Series, and the former Vice President/Secretary of the National Book Critics Circle. Prufer currently resides in Houston, Texas, with artist and critic Mary Hallab.

== Career ==
He is the author of many books of poetry and fiction, a prolific editor and anthologist, and he has published poems, essays, and reviews in literary journals and magazines including The Paris Review, American Poetry Review, Poetry, A Public Space, AGNI, The New Republic, The Kenyon Review, Boston Review, Georgia Review, and in The Best American Poetry (2003, 2009, 2021).

His honors include five Pushcart Prizes, and awards from the Poetry Society of America, the Academy of American Poets, The Lannan Foundation and other organizations. Other awards and honors include The Lena-Miles Wever Todd Poetry Series award, the 2024 Rilke Prize for American Poetry, a National Endowment for the Arts fellowship, and more. His poetry collection How He Loved Them was long-listed for the 2019 Pulitzer Prize for poetry and his Churches was listed as one of the ten best poetry books of the year by The New York Times Book Review.

He has been named the 2026–2027 Texas Poet Laureate.

Prufer is a professor in the Creative Writing Program at the University of Houston, where he also co-directs the Unsung Masters Series, a book series devoted to bringing lost voices in world literature to new generations of readers.

== Published works ==
Full-Length Books

- Strange Wood (Louisiana State University Press, 1998)
- The Finger Bone (Carnegie Mellon University Press, 2002)
- Fallen from a Chariot (Carnegie Mellon University Press, 2005)
- National Anthem (Four Way Books, 2008)
- In A Beautiful Country (Four Way Books, 2011)
- Churches (Four Way Books, 2014)
- How He Loved Them (Four Way Books, 2018)
- The Art of Fiction (Four Way Books, 2021)
- The Fears (Copper Canyon Press, 2023)
- Sleepaway: a Novel (Acre Books, 2024)

Anthologies Edited

- The New Young American Poets (Southern Illinois University Press, 2000)
- Dark Horses: Poets on Overlooked Poems (University of Illinois Press, 2007, with Joy Katz)
- New European Poets (Graywolf Press, 2008, with Wayne Miller)
- Dunstan Thompson: On the Life & Work of a Lost American Master (Pleiades Press, 2010, with D. A. Powell)
- Until Everything is Continuous Again: On the Work of W. S. Merwin (WordFarm, 2012, with Jonathan Weinert)
- Russell Atkins: On the Life and Work of an American Master (Unsung Masters Series, 2013, with Michael Dumanis)
- Catherine Breese Davis: On the Life and Work of an American Master (Unsung Masters Series, 2015, with Martha Collins and Martin Rock)
- Literary Publishing in the 21st Century (Milkweed Editions, 2016, with Wayne Miller and Travis Kurowski)
- Into English: Poems, Translations, Commentaries (Graywolf Press, 2017, with Martha Collins)

Poetry Collections In Translation

- Wir wollten Amerika finden (Luxbooks, 2011) (German translation by Norbert Lange and Susanna Mewe)
- Himno Nacional (Bartleby Editores, 2021) (Spanish translation by multiple translators)

== Honors and awards ==
- 1997 Lena-Miles Wever Todd Poetry Prize
- 2002 Pushcart Prize
- Best American Poetry 2003
- 2004 George Bogin Memorial Award
- 2004 Pushcart Prize
- 2006 George Bogin Memorial Award
- 2007 National Endowment for the Arts Literature Fellowship in Poetry
- 2007 Pushcart Prize
- Best American Poetry 2009
- 2009 Finalist, The Poets Prize
- Best American Poetry 2010
- 2010 Lannan Foundation Fellowship
- 2011 Finalist, The Rilke Prize
- 2012 Academy of American Poets Notable Book
- 2013 Finalist, The Poets Prize
- 2014 The New York Times "Ten Favorite Poetry Books of 2014" for Churches
- 2016 Pushcart Prize
- 2018 Lyric Prize of the Poetry Society of America
- 2019 Long-list, the Pulitzer Prize for poetry
- 2019 Winner, The Julie Suk Award for the best poetry book from the American literary press
- 2019 Finalist, The Rilke Prize for the best book by a mid-career American poet
- Best American Poetry 2021
- 2024 Pushcart Prize
- 2024 Rilke Prize for American Poetry for The Fears (Copper Canyon Press, 2023)
