= Alain Bosquet =

French poet

- Анато́лий Биск
- Born: Anatoliy Bisk; March 28, 1919
- Died: March 17, 1998 (aged 78)

Alain Bosquet, born Anatoliy Bisk (Russian: Анато́лий Биск) (28 March 1919 – 17 March 1998), was a French poet.

== Life ==
In 1925, his family moved to Brussels and he studied at the Université libre de Bruxelles, then at the Sorbonne.

He fought in the Belgian army in 1940, then in the French army. In 1942, he fled with his family to Manhattan, where he helped edit the Free French magazine Voix de France. He enlisted in the U.S. Army during World War II, and received U.S. citizenship. He met his wife, Norma Caplan, in Berlin. He was Special Adviser to the mission on behalf of the Allied Control Council Quadripartite Council of Berlin from 1945 to 1951.

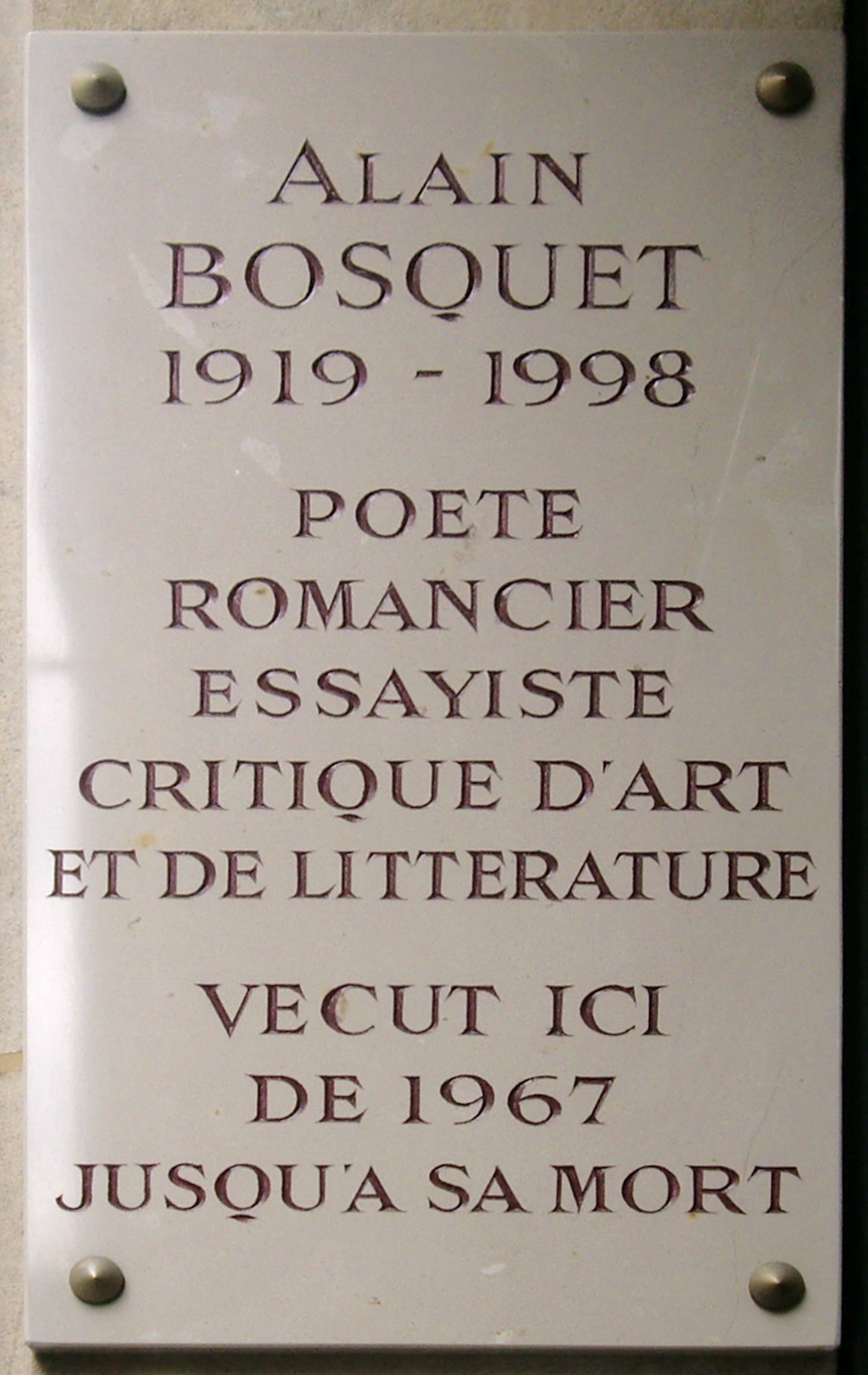
Alain Bosquet commemorative plaque at 32 Rue de Laborde in Paris

In 1947, with Alexander Koval and Édouard Roditi founded the German-language literary review, Das Lot ("The Sounding Line"), six numbers from October 1947 until June, 1952, with publisher Karl Heinz Henssel in Berlin.

In 1957, Galerie Parnass (Wuppertal) published the Artist's book Micro Macro with poems by Alain Bosquet and lithographs from Heinz Trökes in 50 copies.

In 1958, he taught French literature at Brandeis University, then American literature at the University of Lyon from 1959 to 1960. He worked as a freelance critic for Combat, Le Monde, and Le Figaro.

He became a French citizen in 1980.

He headed the jury of the Max Jacob Prize, the Académie Mallarmé and was a member of the Royal Academy of Belgium.

== Awards ==
- 1968 Prix de poésie le Metais-Larivière (by the Académie française)
- 1986 Prix Chateaubriand
- 1989 Prix Goncourt de la poésie
- 1991 Grand prix de la poésie de la ville de Paris
- 1992 Prix de la langue de France
- Officer of the Legion of Honour
- Bronze Star Medal

== Works ==
=== English translations ===
- Graham Dunstan Martin, ed. (1971). Anthology of contemporary French poetry. University of Texas Press. ISBN 9780292710061.
- Selected Poems. Translated by Samuel Beckett; Lawrence Durrell; Fowlie Wallace. Ohio University Press. 1972. ISBN 978-0-8214-0111-8.
- Speech is plurality. Translated by Melvin B. Yoken; Juliet G. Lapointe. University Press of America. 1978. ISBN 978-0-8191-0626-1.
- Instead of music: poems. Translated by William Frawley. Louisiana State University Press. 1980. ISBN 978-0-8071-0584-9.
- No matter no fact: poems. Translated by Samuel Beckett. New Directions Publishing. 1988. ISBN 978-0-8112-1040-9. "Alain Bosquet."
- God's Torment. Translated by Edouard Roditi. Ohio University Press. 1994. ISBN 978-0-8214-1091-2.
- Roger Little, ed. (1999). Stances perdues. Translated by Roger Little. Dedalus. ISBN 978-1-901233-41-4.

=== Poetry ===
- Les mois de l'année
- La vie est clandestine 1945
- A la mémoire de ma planète 1948
- Langue morte 1951
- Quel royaume oublié 1955
- have a nice day and forget you
- Deuxième testament 1959, Prix Max Jacob
- Maître objet 1962
- Quatre testaments et autres poèmes 1967
- 100 notes pour une solitude 1969
- Notes pour un amour 1972
- Penser contre soi 1973
- Notes pour un pluriel 1974
- Livre du doute et de la grâce 1977
- Vingt et une nature morte ou mourantes 1978
- Poème un 1979
- Les enfants 1980
- Raconte-moi le passé... 1980
- Sonnets pour une fin de siècle 1981
- Poème deux 1981
- Un jour après la vie 1984
- L'autre origine 1984
- Le tournament de Dieu 1987, Prix Chateaubriand
- Bourreaux et acrobates, poèmes sans chauffeur 1990
- Le gardien des rosées 1991
- Effacez moi ce visage 1991
- Capitaine de l'absurde 1991
- Demain sans moi 1994
- La fable et le fouet 1995
- Mer
- Les mots sont des êtres
- La trompe de l'éléphant
- Un enfant m'a dit...
- Arbre

=== Essays ===
- Saint-John Perse
- Pierre Emmanuel
- Walt Whitman
- Emily Dickinson
- Robert Sabatier
- Lawrence Durrell
- Conrad Aiken
- Carl Sandburg
- Anthologie de la poésie américaine 1956
- 35 jeunes poètes américains 1961
- Verbe et vertige 1962
- Les 20 Meilleurs Nouvelles Françaises (1964) Ed. Gérard et C^{o}, Coll. " Bibliothèque Marabout Géant " n° 192.
- Les 20 Meilleurs Nouvelles Russes (1964) Ed. Gérard et C^{o}, Coll. " Bibliothèque Marabout Géant " n° 202.
- Middle West 1967
- Un atlas des voyages 1967
- Injustice 1969
- Les Poèmes de l'année, Alain Bosquet, Pierre Seghers, eds, Seghers., 1968
- Roger Caillois 1971
- En compagnie de Marcel Arland 1973
- Pas d'accord Soljénitsyne 1974
- La poésie française depuis 1950, une anthologie 1979
- La poésie francophone de Belgique 1987
- La mémoire ou l'oubli 1990
- Marlène Dietrich, une amour par téléphone 1992
- La Russie en lambeaux 1991
- Van Vogh 1980

=== Novels ===
- La Grande Éclipse 1952
- Ni singe ni Dieu 1953
- Le mécréant 1960
- Un besoin de malheur 1963
- La Confession mexicaine 1965
- Les tigres de papier 1968
- L'amour à deux têtes 1970
- Chicago, oignon sauvage 1971
- Monsieur Vaudeville 1973
- L'amour bourgeois 1974
- Les bonnes intentions 1975
- Une mère russe 1978
- Jean-louis Trabart, médecin 1980
- L'enfant que tu étais 1982
- Ni guerre, ni paix 1983
- Les Petites éternités 1984 → 1964
- Les fêtes cruelles 1984
- Lettre à mon père qui aurait eu 100 ans 1987
- Claudette comme tout le monde 1991
- Les solitudes 1992

=== Stories ===
- Georges et Arnold, Arnold et Georges 1995
- Marlène Dietrich, Un amour par téléphone, Paris, La Différence, 1992, rééd. coll. "Minos", 2002.

=== Non-fiction ===
- Un homme pour un autre 1985
- Le métier d'otage 1989
- Comme un refus de la planète 1989

=== Theatre ===
- Un détenu à Auschwitz 1991
- Kafka-Auschwitz 1993
