= Ninth Letter =

- Discipline: Literary journal
- Language: English
- Edited by: Jodee Stanley

Publication details
- History: 2004-present
- Publisher: University of Illinois at Urbana–Champaign (United States)
- Frequency: Biannual

Standard abbreviations
- ISO 4: Ninth Lett.

Indexing
- ISSN: 1547-8440

Links
- Journal homepage

Ninth Letter is a literary magazine that publishes poetry, fiction, and nonfiction. It is an interdisciplinary collaboration between the School of Art + Design and the Creative Writing Program at the University of Illinois at Urbana–Champaign. Ninth Letter exists in two related but distinct forms: a biannual print magazine and a website that features new electronic content on a continuous basis. In 2004, the first issue was published. It included fiction from Pulitzer Prize recipient Robert Olen Butler, Katherine Vaz, and an interview with Yann Martel, the author of the Man Booker Prize-winning novel Life of Pi.

Notable contributors include Roxane Gay, Jaquira Díaz, John Sibley Williams, Ismail Kadare, Jennifer Percy, Kathy Fagan, Lynne Sharon Schwartz, Janice N. Harrington, Lisa Russ Spaar, and Will Schwartz.

== Awards and honors ==
Work published in Ninth Letter has been selected for many awards anthologies such as Best American Nonrequired Reading, Best American Poetry, The Pushcart Prize, Best American Short Stories, Year's Best Fantasy and Horror, Best Creative Nonfiction, Best New Fantasy, Best New Poets, Best of the Net, and New Stories from the Midwest. It has also been honored in Best American Essays. Roxane Gay's “To Scratch, Claw, or Grope Clumsily or Frantically," appeared in Bad Feminist after it was published in Ninth Letter. At an editorial meeting, Philip Graham learned that Gay competed in Scrabble tournaments. So, he said, “Hey, let’s contact her and ask if she’d be interested in writing an essay about that for us.”. It was later honored as a notable essay in The Best American Essays 2013 edited by Cheryl Strayed and Robert Atwan.

The journal has also received many national and international awards for graphic design, and has been featured in the design awards annuals of both STEP Inside Design and HOW Magazine. In 2005 Ninth Letter was named Best New Literary Journal by the Council of Learned Journals, an affiliate of the Modern Language Association. In a 2021 spotlight, The Bennington Review described a recent issue of Ninth Letter as an issue marked by "amazing pieces of poetry and prose" and "visually stunning pages of artwork sprinkled throughout."

Newpages describes Ninth Letter as "a fun project that ticks all the normal lit journal boxes while providing energy and flash where other journals play it low key." The journal is ranked as one of the best places that publish fiction and nonfiction.

It has also been lauded for its commitment to diversity

== See also ==
- List of literary magazines
