= Poetry Society of America =

Literary organization founded in 1910

- Established: 1910
- Type: Poetry organization
- Location: New York, New York
- Website: poetrysociety.org

The Poetry Society of America is a literary organization founded in 1910 by poets, editors, and artists. It is the oldest poetry organization in the United States. Past members of the society have included such renowned poets as Witter Bynner, Robert Frost, Langston Hughes, Edna St. Vincent Millay, Marianne Moore, and Wallace Stevens.

== History ==
In 1910, the Poetry Society of America held its first official meeting in the National Arts Club in Manhattan.

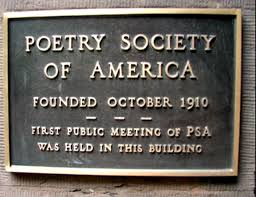

Jessie Belle Rittenhouse, a founding member and Secretary of the PSA, documented the founding of the Poetry Society of America in her autobiography My House of Life writing "It was not, however, to be an organization in the formal sense of the word, but founded upon the salon idea, a place where poets would gather to read and discuss their work and that of their contemporaries, the group to be united largely through the hospitality of our hosts at whose apartments it was proposed we should continue to meet...When, after much enthusiastic speech-making, a committee was appointed to retire and discuss the details, I had no hesitancy in saying—though at the risk of seeming ungrateful to our hosts—that it was much too big an idea to be narrowed down to a social function, into which it would inevitably deteriorate, and if the Society were developed at all, it ought to be along national lines, and should meet in a public rather than a private place."

Within the first few years, poets such as Amy Lowell, Ezra Pound and W. B. Yeats regularly attended meetings.

== Poetry In Motion ==
In 1992 the Poetry Society launched Poetry in Motion along with the New York City MTA in the New York City subway system, a program which has since placed poetry in the transit systems of over 20 cities throughout the country such as: Atlanta, Boston, Chicago, Los Angeles, New Orleans, Portland, and Salt Lake City. The program has been honored with numerous awards including a Design for Transportation Merit Award, the New York Municipal Society's Certificate of Merit, and in 2000 a proclamation from the Council of the City of New York that honored the program for its "invaluable contribution to the people of New York City." In addition, three anthologies of poems appearing in the program have been published: Poetry in Motion: 100 Poems from the Subways and Buses, edited by Molly Peacock and Elise Paschen (W. W. Norton, 1996); Poetry in Motion from Coast to Coast: 120 Poems from the Subway, edited by Brett Fletcher Lauer and Elise Paschen (W. W. Norton, 2002); and The Best of Poetry in Motion: Celebrating Twenty-Five Years on Subways and Buses, edited by Alice Quinn with a foreword by Billy Collins (W. W. Norton, 2017).

== Pulitzer Prize ==
The Poetry Society was instrumental in the establishment of a Pulitzer Prize for Poetry. In 1917, after the first Pulitzer prizes were awarded, Society member Edward J. Wheeler petitioned the President of Columbia University to include poetry as an award category. After receiving a reply from the President that there had been no funds allocated to award a prize in poetry, Wheeler secured $500 on behalf of the Society from a New York City art patron in order to establish the prize. The Poetry Society continued to provide this support until 1922 when Columbia University as well as the Pulitzer Board, voted to regularize a Pulitzer Prize in Poetry.

== Awards given by the Poetry Society of America ==
In 1915 the Society began conferring awards honoring innovation and mastery of the form by emerging and established American poets.

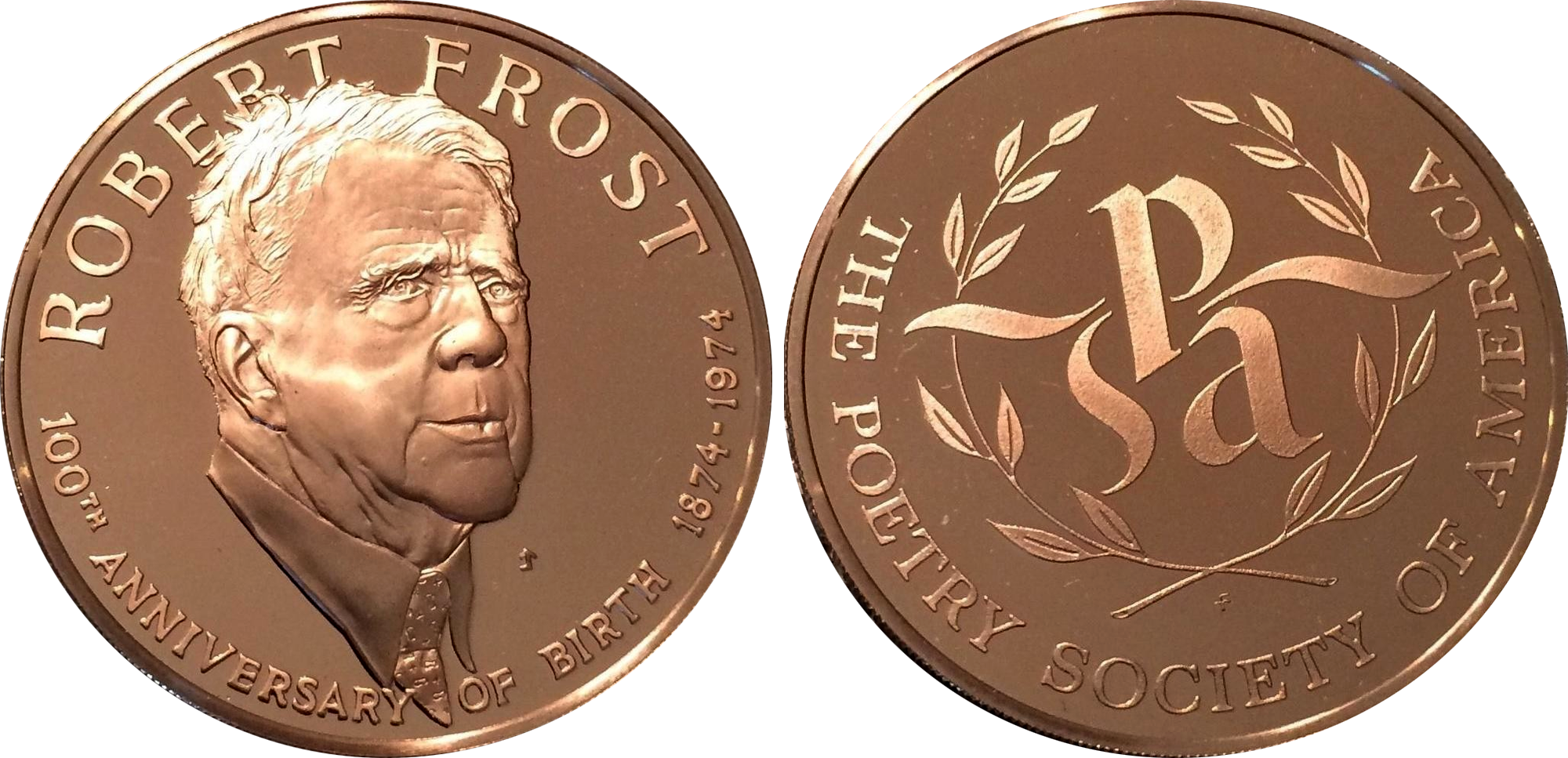
The Robert Frost Medal

- Frost Medal — for distinguished lifetime achievement in American poetry. Inaugurated 1930; awarded annually since 1984. The medal was first presented in 1930 to Jessie Belle Rittenhouse, and to the memory of Bliss Carman and George Edward Woodberry. Over the next 53 years, the Frost Medal was awarded eleven times, to poets at the end of their careers. In 1984, it became an annual award to a living poet. Since 1995, the recipient of the Frost Medal has delivered the Frost Medal Lecture. Medalists receive a prize purse of $5,000. Robert Frost was the fourth recipient of the Frost Medal, in 1941, after he retired from Amherst College.
- Shelley Memorial Award — offered by the society to a poet living in the United States who is chosen on the basis of "genius and need." Awarded annually since 1930, with the exception of 1933.
- Four Quartets Prize – for a unified and complete sequence of poems published in America in a print or online journal, chapbook, or book; presented in partnership with the T.S. Eliot Foundation. Awarded annually since 2018.

=== Chapbook fellowships ===
Beginning in 2003, the Society began sponsoring The PSA Chapbook Fellowship, an annual contest awarding four fellowships to poets who have not yet published a full-length poetry collection. The program provides editorial and design support, publication, distribution, and a public reading. Since its inception, the fellowship has published work by more than eighty poets, many of whom have gone on to receive major literary awards and academic appointments. Winners include:

- 2025:
  - Dolapo Demuren, selected by Monica Ferrell
  - Harrison Hamm, selected by C. Dale Young
- 2024:
  - Diana Keren Lee, selected by Tomás Q. Morín
  - Kyle Okeke, selected by Vievee Francis
- 2023:
  - Luke Allan, selected by Ishion Hutchinson
  - David Gorin, selected by Jennifer Chang
- 2022:
  - The Opening by Sahar Romani, selected by Kazim Ali
  - Several American Flowers by Bridget O’Bernstein, selected by Eileen Myles
- 2021:
  - Lauren Green, selected by Joshua Bennett
- 2020:
  - Emily Lee Luan, selected by Gabrielle Calvocoressi
  - Nathan Xavier Osorio, selected by Oliver de la Paz
  - Margaret Ray, selected by Jericho Brown
  - Ethan Stebbins, selected by Kim Addonizio
- 2019:
  - Darien Hsu Gee, selected by Patricia Smith
  - Laura Cresté, selected by Stephanie Burt
  - Isabella DeSendi, selected by Evie Shockley
  - Dujie Tahat, selected by Fady Joudah
- 2018:
  - Joann Gardner, selected by D. Nurkse
  - Heather Hamilton, selected by Aimee Nezhukumatathil
  - Như Xuân Nguyễn, selected by Adrian Matejika
  - Laura Romeyn, selected by Ange Mlinko
- 2017:
  - Nicholas Goodly, selected by Brenda Shaughnessy
  - zakia henderson‐brown, selected by Cate Marvin
  - Emily Hunerwadel, selected by Kyle Dargan
  - Esther Lin, selected by Patrick Rosal
- 2016:
  - Ryan Black, selected by Linda Gregerson
  - William Brewer, selected by Marilyn Nelson
  - Brandon Kreitler, selected by Major Jackson
  - Analicia Sotelo, selected by Rigoberto González
- 2015:
  - Dreams of Unhappiness by Sarah Trudgeon, selected by Don Paterson
  - Of Nectar by Amanda Turner, selected by A. Van Jordan
  - Year Zero by Monica Sok, selected by Marilyn Chin
  - Instructions for Building a Wind Chime by Adriana Cloud, selected by Jane Hirshfield
- 2014:
  - Aeons by Max Ritvo, selected by Jean Valentine
  - Arctic Revival by Callie Siskel, selected by Elizabeth Alexander
  - True To Life: cuttings, mechanics, & modifications by HL Hazuka, selected by Forrest Gander
  - Thirst by Eva Maria Saavedra, selected by Marilyn Hacker
- 2013:
  - Err to Narrow by Alicia Salvadeo, selected by Nick Flynn
  - Modern Camping by Tyler Flynn Dorholt, selected by John Yau
  - Manhattations by MRB Chelko, selected by Mary Ruefle
  - Barbarian at the Gate by Xavier Cavazos, selected by Thomas Sayers Ellis
- 2012:
  - Travel and Leisure by Eric Bliman, selected by Vijay Seshadri
  - mere eye by Danielle Blau, selected by D. A. Powell
  - Self-Portrait as Missing Person by Justin Boening, selected by Dara Wier
  - Theory of Tides by Cherry Pickman, selected by Lucia Perillo
- 2011:
  - Dear Johnny, In Your Last Letter by Angela Veronica Wong, selected by Bob Hicok
  - Little Box of Cotton & Lightning by Marni Ludwig, selected by Susan Howe
  - Your Bright Hand by E. J. Garcia, selected by Gerald Stern
  - What We Push Against by Alison Roh Park, selected by Joy Harjo
- 2010:
  - Fragments of Loss by Hossannah Asuncion, selected by Kimiko Hahn
  - Slow Dance with Trip Wire by Camille Rankine, selected by Cornelius Eady
  - Black Anecdote by Andrew Seguin, selected by Rosanna Warren
- 2009:
  - A History of Waves by Haines Eason, selected by Mark Doty
  - The Good News of the Ground by Heidi Johannesen Poon, selected by Cole Swensen
  - The Sundering by Stephanie Adams-Santos, selected by Linda Gregg
  - Lure by Jocelyn Casey-Whiteman, selected by Arthur Sze
- 2008:
  - Blue House by Christopher Nelson, selected by Mary Jo Bang
  - Swerve by John Estes, selected by C.K. Williams
  - Ave, Materia by Jean Hartig, selected by Fanny Howe
  - The Category of Outcast by CJ Evans, selected by Terrance Hayes
- 2007:
  - Dear Wild Abandon by Andrew Michael Roberts, selected by Mark Strand
  - Dream of Water by Kate Ingold, selected by Harryette Mullen
  - Monster Theory by Lytton Smith, selected by Kevin Young
  - The Original Instructions for the Perfect Preservation of Birds &c. by Carey McHugh, selected by Rae Armantrout
- 2006:
  - Mayport by Maureen Thorson, selected by Heather McHugh
  - The Eights by Dan Chelotti, selected by Yusef Komunyakaa
  - Locket, Master by Maya Pindyck, selected by Paul Muldoon
  - On animate life: its profligacy, organ meats, etc. by Jessica Fjeld, selected by Lyn Hejinian
- 2005:
  - Guarding the Violins by Misty Harper, selected by Charles Simic
  - What Remains by Stuart Greenhouse, selected by Brenda Hillman
  - Cold Work by Cecily Parks, selected by Li-Young Lee
  - The Next Country by Idra Novey, selected by Carolyn Forche
- 2004:
  - Meditations by Joshua Poteat, selected by Mary Oliver
  - Woman in a Boat by K. E. Allen, selected by Robert Creeley
  - Gilda by Andrea Baker, selected by Claudia Rankine
  - Speaking Past the Tongue by Justin Goldberg, selected by Henri Cole
- 2003:
  - Rowing Through Fog by Kerri Webster, selected by Carl Phillips
  - The Morning Hour by Dawn Lundy Martin, selected by C. D. Wright
  - Forget Rita by Paul Killebrew, selected by John Ashbery
  - The Misremembered World by Tess Taylor, selected by Eavan Boland

=== Annual awards ===
In addition to the Frost Medal, Shelley Award, and Four Quartets Prize, the Poetry Society confers other awards:

- Writer Magazine/Emily Dickinson Award — awarded for a poem inspired by Emily Dickinson.
- Cecil Hemley Memorial Award — awarded for a lyric poem that addresses a philosophical or epistemological concern.
- Lyric Poetry Award — awarded for a lyric poem on any subject.
- Lucille Medwick Memorial Award — awarded for an original poem in any form on a humanitarian theme.
- Louise Louis/Emily F. Bourne Student Poetry Award — awarded for the best unpublished poem by a student in grades 9 through 12 from the United States.
- George Bogin Memorial Award — awarded for a selection of four or five poems that use language in an original way to reflect the encounter of the ordinary and the extraordinary and to take a stand against oppression in any of its forms.
- Robert H. Winner Memorial Award — awarded to original work being done in mid-career by a poet who has not had substantial recognition.
- Alice Fay Di Castagnola Award — awarded for ten pages of poetry from a manuscript-in-progress.
- Norma Farber First Book Award — for a first book of original poetry written by an American and published in either a hard or soft cover in a standard edition.
- William Carlos Williams Award — offered by the society for the best book of poetry published by a small, non-profit, or university press.
