= 2006 in poetry =

Nationality words link to articles with information on the nation's poetry or literature (for instance, Irish or France).

== Events ==
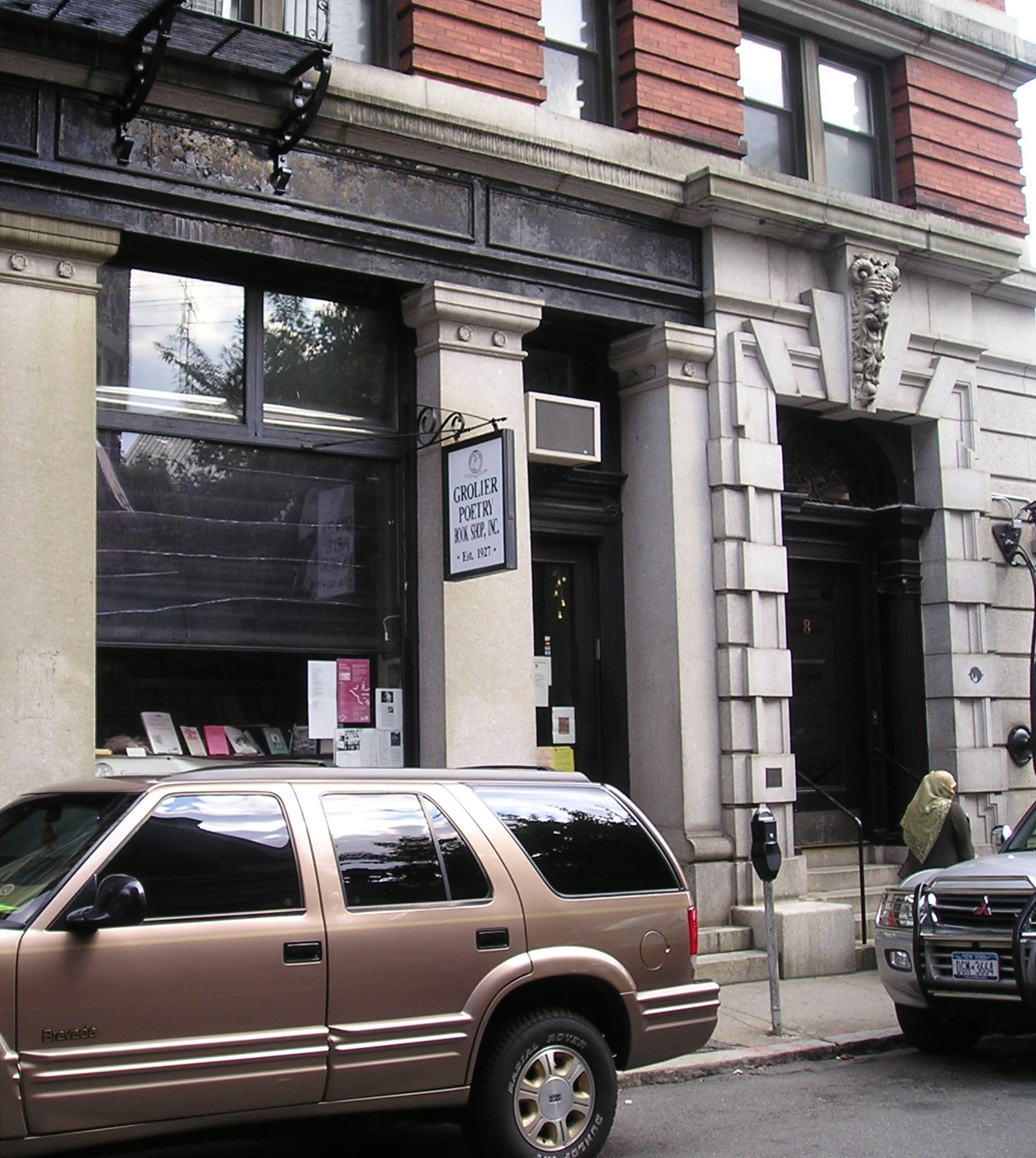
Grolier Poetry Bookstore

- January – The Ogura Hyakunin Isshu Cultural Foundation, founded by the Kyoto, Japan, Chamber of Commerce and Industry, opens the Ogura Hyakunin Isshu Hall of Fame, dedicated to the anthology of 100 poems by 100 poets compiled by Fujiwara no Teika in c. 1235. The popularity of the anthology endures, and a Japanese card game, Uta-garuta, uses cards with the poems printed on it.
- March 29 – The Grolier Poetry Bookshop in Cambridge, Massachusetts, is sold.
- May – The Poetry Out Loud recitation contest is created this year by the National Endowment for the Arts and The Poetry Foundation in the United States to increase awareness in the art of performing poetry, with a top prize a $20,000 scholarship. State finalists perform in Washington, D.C. during the second week of the month.
- July 14
  - Kazakh poet Aron Atabek is arrested after riot police and bulldozers arrive at the shanty town of Shanyrak, Kazakhstan for its demolition. Atabek is sentenced to 18 years in prison for alleged offences relating to the clash this day between protesters and police.
  - The Times Literary Supplement reports on the discovery of a missing copy of Shelley's Poetical Essay on the Existing State of Things, an 1811 pamphlet containing a 172-line poem which criticizes war, politics and religion; although published anonymously, the poem is thought to have contributed to the rebel poet's expulsion from the University of Oxford (which acquires the unique copy of the pamphlet in 2015).
- August 15 – The existence of two early poems by Ted Hughes, written into a school exercise book, is announced; one an early version of "Song" which appeared in his first collection.
- November 1 – A Sylvia Plath sonnet from her college years is discovered and first published by Blackbird, an online literary journal run by the English Department at Virginia Commonwealth University in Richmond, Virginia.
- November 10 – A new series, "The Best of Irish Poetry" is launched by Southword Editions in Ireland with the 80-page The Best of Irish Poetry 2007 The project is under the direction of Patrick Cotter, with Colm Breathnach as Irish-language editor and Maurice Riordan as English-language (or Hiberno-English) editor. "Quite often readers abroad are presented with a selection of Irish poets restricted to those who are first published in the USA or the UK," Cotter wrote. "This annual series will present a more general selection generated by more informed pundits."
- November – The most influential American poets of all time are Walt Whitman, T. S. Eliot, William Carlos Williams, Wallace Stevens and Sylvia Plath, according to Christian Wiman, editor of Poetry magazine. Wiman names the poets in a sidebar article to a December The Atlantic Monthly cover story about the "100 Most Influential Americans" — no poet makes it on that larger list.
- French public notary Patrick Huet unveils Pieces of Hope to the Echo of the World in Lyon. It is reportedly the longest modern hand-written poem in the world.
- BLATT, an English-language literary magazine and publishing imprint is started in Prague, Czech Republic.
- Pakistani poet Ahmed Faraz, who writes in Urdu, returns one of his country's highest civilian honors, the Hilal-e-Imtiaz, out of disgust with President Pervez Musharraf's government. The prize had been awarded to the poet in 2004 for his literary achievements. "My conscience will not forgive me if I remained a silent spectator of the sad happenings around us", he said. "The least I can do is to let the dictatorship know where it stands in the eyes of the concerned citizens, whose fundamental rights have been usurped."
- The Science Fiction Poetry Association establishes the Dwarf Stars Award to honour very short (10 lines or less) speculative poems.

== Works published in English ==
Listed by nation where the work was first published and again by the poet's native land, if different; substantially revised works listed separately:

=== Australia ===
See also 2006 in Australian literature

- Robert Adamson The Goldfinches of Baghdad
- Ken Babstock, Airstream Land Yacht (Black Inc.), ISBN 978-1-86395-214-9
- Laurie Duggan, The Passenger, winner of the 2007 Arts Queensland Judith Wright Calanthe Award; St. Lucia: University of Queensland Press
- Stephen Edgar, Other Summers, 108 pp; named a "Book of the Year" by The Age; Melbourne: Black Pepper, ISBN 978-1-876044-54-1
- Brook Emery, At a Slight Angle: And Other Poems, Picaro Press.
- Robert Gray, Nameless Earth
- Jennifer Harrison: Folly & Grief (Black Pepper) ISBN 978-1-876044-45-9
- Dennis Haskell, All the Time in the World
- Judy Johnson, Jack
- S. K. Kelen, Earthly Delights
- Chris Mansell, Love poems (Kardoorair, Armidale)
- Graeme Miles, Phosphorescence
- Les Murray, The Biplane Houses
- Dorothy Porter, The Best Australian Poems 2006 (Black, Inc.), ISBN 978-1-86395-262-0
- Mark Reid, A Difficult Faith
- Thomas Shapcott, The City of Empty Rooms
- Craig Sherborne, Necessary Evil, Black Inc., ISBN 978-1-86395-206-4
- John Tranter, Urban Myths: 210 Poems
- rob walker, "micromacro" ISBN 978-1-74008-415-4
- Chris Wallace-Crabbe, Then
- Simon West, First Names
- Fay Zwicky, Picnic

=== Canada ===
- Margaret Avison, Momentary Dark
- Elizabeth Bachinsky, Home of Sudden Service
- Ven Begamudré, The Lightness Which Is Our World, Seen from Afar
- Earle Birney, One Muddy Hand: Selected Poems, Sam Solecki ed. Posthumous.
- Dionne Brand, Inventory
- George Elliott Clarke, Black, Vancouver: Polestar, ISBN 978-1-55192-903-3
- Wayne Clifford, The Book of Were
- Leonard Cohen, Book of Longing
- Jon Paul Fiorentino, The Theory of the Loser Class (Coach House Books) ISBN 978-1-55245-168-7
- Maxine Gadd, Backup to Babylon
- Matthew Holmes, Hitch, a first volume
- Anita Lahey, Out to Dry in Cape Breton
- Elizabeth Mayne, A Passionate Continuity
- Don McKay:
  - Strike/Slip winner of the 2007 Canadian Griffin Poetry Prize and the Dorothy Livesay Poetry Prize
  - Field Marks: The Poetry of Don McKay edited by Méira Cook
- Garry Thomas Morse, Transversals for Orpheus
- Michael Ondaatje, The Story, Toronto: House of Anansi, ISBN 978-0-88784-194-1
- P. K. Page, Hand Luggage: A Memoir in Verse
- Sina Queyras, Lemon Hound (Coach House Books) ISBN 978-1-55245-167-0
- Angela Rawlings, Wide Slumber for Lepidopterists (Coach House Books) ISBN 978-1-55245-169-4
- Raymond Souster:
  - Down to Earth Battered Silicon Dispatch Box.
  - Wondrous Wobbly World: Poems for the New Millennium.
  - Uptown Downtown Battered Silicon Dispatch Box.
- Nathalie Stephens, Touch to Affliction (Coach House Books) ISBN 978-1-55245-175-5
- Sharon Thesen, The Good Bacteria

=== India, in English ===
- Keki Daruwalla, Collected poems, 1970–2005 ( Poetry in English ), New Delhi and New York City : Penguin Books
- Anjum Hasan, Street on the Hill ( Poetry in English ), New Delhi : Sahitya Akademi.
- Meena Kandasamy, Touch ( Poetry in English ), Mumbai : Peacock Books
- Suniti Namjoshi, Sycorax: New Fables and Poems ( Poetry in English ), Penguin India, New Delhi, 2006. ISBN 978-0-14-309948-2
- Robin Ngangom, The Desire of Roots( Poetry in English ), Cuttack : Chandrabhaga
- E.V. Ramakrishnan, Terms of Seeing: New and Selected Poems, ( Poetry in English ), New Delhi: Konark Publishers, ISBN 978-81-220-0711-4,
- Udaya Narayana Singh, Second Person Singular, translated from the original Maithili of the author's Madhyampurush Ekvachan by the author and Rizio Yohanan Raj; New Delhi : Katha

=== Ireland ===
- Vona Groarke, Juniper Street, Oldcastle: The Gallery Press, Ireland
- Seamus Heaney, District and Circle, Faber & Faber; Irish poet published in the United Kingdom
- Maurice Riordan and Colm Breathnach, editors, Best of Irish Poetry 2007 selections from 50 Irish poets, including Eavan Boland, Seamus Heaney, Thomas McCarthy, Paul Muldoon, Paul Durcan, Eamon Grennan, Vona Groarke, Thomas Kinsella, Michael Longley, Dorothy Molloy, Gerry Murphy, Katie Donovan, Matthew Sweeney, Derek Mahon, Gabriel Rosenstock, Louis De Paor, Nuala Ní Dhomhnaill (Southward Editions) ISBN 978-1-905002-23-8 (anthology) Ireland (published November 2006)
- Justin Quinn, Waves and Trees, Oldcastle: The Gallery Press

=== New Zealand ===
- Airini Beautrais Secret Heart, Victoria University Press
- Glenn Colquhoun, Playing God
- Janet Frame, The Goose Bath, posthumous
- Bill Manhire, Lifted
- Cilla McQueen, A Wind Harp (compact disc)
- Alison Wong, Cup, Publisher: Steele Roberts

==== Poets in Best New Zealand Poems ====
Poems from these 25 poets were selected by John Newton for Best New Zealand Poems 2015, published online this year:

- Michele Amas
- Angela Andrews
- Stu Bagby
- Jenny Bornholdt
- James Brown
- Janet Charman
- Geoff Cochrane
- Mary Cresswell
- Wystan Curnow
- Stephanie de Montalk
- Fiona Farrell
- Bernadette Hall
- Anne Kennedy
- Michele Leggott
- Anna Livesey
- Karlo Mila
- James Norcliffe
- Gregory O'Brien
- Vivienne Plumb
- Anna Smaill
- Elizabeth Smither
- Robert Sullivan
- Brian Turner
- Ian Wedde
- Sonja Yelich

=== United Kingdom ===
- Carol Ann Duffy and Jane Ray, The Lost Happy Endings, Penguin
- James Fenton:
  - Selected Poems (2006) Penguin
  - Editor, The New Faber Book of Love Poems (anthology)
- John Haynes (poet), Letter to Patience, a book-length poem in iambic pentameter, in the form of a letter from a Nigerian father in Britain to his friend back in Nigeria; winner of the Costa Book Award
- Seamus Heaney, District and Circle, Faber & Faber; Irish poet published in the United Kingdom
- Allison Hedge Coke – Blood Run, Salt Publications
- Geoffrey Hill: Without Title
- Derek Mahon, Adaptations (A collection of versions, rather than translations proper, from poets such as Pasolini, Juvenal, Bertolt Brecht, Valery, Baudelaire, Rilke, and Nuala Ní Dhomhnaill.) Gallery Press
- Roger Moulson, Waiting for the Night-Rowers, Enitharmon Press, winner of the 2006 Jerwood Aldeburgh First Collection Prize
- Sean O'Brien, Inferno: a verse version of Dante's Inferno (Picador)
- Robin Robertson, Swithering, winner of the 2006 Forward Poetry Prize for Best Collection, shortlisted for the T.S. Eliot Prize
- Claire Tomalin, Thomas Hardy, Penguin Press, one of The New York Times "100 Notable Books of the Year" for 2007 (biography)
- Hugo Williams, Dear Room, (Faber and Faber)

==== Poets included in New Writing 14 ====
This book of British writing (Granta, ISBN 978-1-86207-850-5), edited by Lavinia Greenlaw and Helon Habila, contains short stories, essays and excerpts of novels in addition to poems by these poets:

- Carrie Etter
- Iain Galbraith
- Chenjerai Hove
- Stephen Knight
- Frances Leviston
- Carola Luther
- Jamie McKendrick
- David Morley
- Paul Muldoon
- Blessing Musariri
- Sean O'Brien
- Don Paterson
- Paul Perry
- Greta Stoddart
- Eoghan Walls

=== United States ===
- A. R. Ammons, Selected Poems, American Poets Project of the Library of America; distributed by Penguin Putnam, posthumous
- Renée Ashley, The Museum of Lost Wings
- Bruce Beasley, The Corpse Flower: New and Selected Poems, University of Washington Press, ISBN 978-0-295-98638-8
- Robin Becker, Domain of Perfect Affection, Pittsburgh University Press
- Elizabeth Bishop, Edgar Allan Poe & The Juke-Box: Uncollected Poems, Drafts, and Fragments, Alice Quinn, editor (Farrar, Straus & Giroux), posthumous
- Charles Bukowski, Come On In!: New Poems (Ecco)
- Hayden Carruth, Toward the Distant Islands: New and Selected Poems, Copper Canyon Press, edited by Sam Hamill
- Jared Carter, Cross this Bridge at a Walk, Wind Publications.
- Carson Cistulli Some Common Weaknesses Illustrated, Casagrande Press.
- Hart Crane, Hart Crane: Complete Poems and Selected Letters, edited by Langdon Hammer, Library of America (posthumous)
- Robert Creeley, On Earth: Last Poems and an Essay (University of California Press)
- Dick Davis, Trick of Sunlight, Swallow Press
- Michael Dumanis and Cate Marvin, Editors, Legitimate Dangers: American Poets of the New Century (Sarabande Books)
- Daisy Fried, My Brother Is Getting Arrested Again (University of Pittsburgh Press), a finalist for the National Book Critics Circle Award for poetry
- Jack Gilbert, Tough Heaven: Poems of Pittsburgh, Transgressions: Selected Poems
- Allen Ginsberg, Collected Poems, 1947–1997 (posthumous), one of the New York Times "100 Notable Books of the Year", an expanded edition of the 1984 Collected Poems, 1947–1980
- Jesse Glass, The Passion of Phineas Gage and Selected Poems (West House/Ahadada)
- Eugene Gloria, Hoodlum Birds, Penguin
- Louise Glück, Averno (Farrar, Straus and Giroux), one of the New York Times "100 Notable Books of the Year"
- Linda Gregg, In the Middle Distance, Graywolf
- Donald Hall, White Apples and the Taste of Stone: Selected Poems 1946–2006 (Houghton Mifflin)
- Suheir Hammad, ZataarDiva, book and CD (Cypher/Rattapallax)
- Jim Harrison, Saving Daylight (Copper Canyon Press) ISBN 978-1-55659-235-5
- Seamus Heaney, District and Circle, Farrar Straus & Giroux
- Allison Hedge Coke – Blood Run, US edition
- George Heym, Poems (Northwestern University Press, translated from German by Antony Hasler
- Jeffrey Harrison, Incomplete Knowledge, Four Way Books
- Jane Hirshfield, After: Poems, (HarperCollins), named as one of the best books of the year by The Washington Post
- Paul Hoover, Edge and Fold (Apogee Press)
- Frieda Hughes, Forty-Five (HarperCollins)
- Troy Jollimore, Tom Thomson in Purgatory (MARGIE/Intuit House), winner of the National Book Critics Circle Award for poetry
- Patricia Spears Jones, Femme du Monde: Poems, (Tia Chucha Press)
- Mary Karr, Sinners Welcome: Poems (HarperCollins)
- Ariana-Sophia M. Kartsonis, Intaglio, Kent State
- Galway Kinnell, Strong Is Your Hold (Houghton Mifflin Books), the poet's first collection of new poems in more than a decade, one of the New York Times "100 Notable Books of the Year"
- Thomas Kinsella, Collected Poems: 1956–2001, Wake Forest
- Kei Miller, Kingdom of Empty Bellies, Jamaican poet published in the United States:
- Hannah Nijinsky and John Most, Persephone (AQP Collective)
- Alice Notley, Grave of Light: New and Selected Poems 1970–2005 (Wesleyan University Press)
- Mary Oliver, Thirst (Beacon Press)
- Carl Phillips, Riding Westward, New York: Farrar, Straus and Giroux
- George Quasha, Axial Stones: An Art of Precarious Balance, foreword Carter Ratcliff (North Atlantic Books, Berkeley) [sculpture & poetry/preverbs]
- Ishmael Reed, New and Collected Poems, 1964–2006, one of the New York Times "100 Notable Books of the Year"
- Lisa Robertson, The Men: A Lyric Book (BookThug) ISBN 978-0-9739742-5-6
- Theodore Roethke, Straw for the Fire: From the Notebooks of Theodore Roethke, compiled by David Wagoner from "277 spiral notebooks of poetry fragments, aphorisms, jokes, memos, journal entries, random phrases, bits of dialog, commentary, and fugitive miscellany", Copper Canyon Press, ISBN 978-1-55659-248-5 (posthumous)
- Miltos Sachtouris, Poems (1945–1971), bilingual edition, Greek with English translation by Karen Emmerich (Archipelago Books), finalist for the National Book Critics Circle Award for poetry
- Frederick Seidel, Ooga-Booga, (Farrar, Straus & Giroux), a finalist for the National Book Critics Circle Award for poetry
- Julie Sheehan, Orient Point: Poems, (W.W. Norton & Co.)
- Patricia Smith, Teahouse of the Almighty: Poems, selected by Ed Sanders (Coffee House Press, 2006)
- W.D. Snodgrass, Not For Specialists, New and Selected Poems, (BOA Editions, Ltd.), a finalist for the National Book Critics Circle Award for Poetry
- Mark Strand, Man and Camel (Alfred A. Knopf) by a Canadian native long living in and published in the United States
- Rosmarie Waldrop, Splitting Image (Zasterle), Curves to the Apple (New Directions)
- Alicia E. Vasquez, 1719 Union St. (Wasteland Press)
- Eliot Weinberger, Muhammed, (Verso, W.W. Norton & Co.)
- Dara Wier, Remnants of Hannah, Wave Books
- C.K. Williams, Collected Poems
- George Witte, The Apparitioners, Three Rail Press
- Charles Wright, Scar Tissue, (Farrar, Straus and Giroux)
- Franz Wright, God's Silence (Alfred A. Knopf)
- Robert Wrigley, Earthly Meditations: New and Selected Poems, Penguin
- Louis Zukofsky, Selected Poems, American Poets Project of the Library of America, distributed by Penguin Putnam; posthumous
- Jesse Lee Kercheval, Film History As Train Wreck

==== Anthologies in the United States ====
- Harold Bloom and Jesse Zuba, editors, American Religious Poems: An Anthology, Library of America
- Michael Hofmann, editor, Twentieth-Century German Poetry: An Anthology (Farrar, Straus and Giroux)
- Joy Katz and Kevin Prufer, editors, Dark Horses: Poets on Overlooked Poems, 76 poems, each selected by a poet who was asked to provide an "unknown or underappreciated poem written by anyone, in any language, from any era", along with a brief essay by the selecting poet about the poem each chose; Illinois University Press
- Jeb Livingood, series editor; Eric Pankey, editor, Best New Poets 2006: 50 Poems from Emerging Writers, Samovar
- Anne Marie Hacht, Poetry for Students, Volume 23

==== Poets included in The Best American Poetry 2006 ====
Poets included in The Best American Poetry 2006, edited by David Lehman, co-edited this year by Billy Collins:

- Kim Addonizio
- Dick Allen
- Craig Arnold
- John Ashbery
- Jesse Ball
- Krista Benjamin
- Ilya Bernstein
- Gaylord Brewer
- Tom Christopher
- Laura Cronk
- Carl Dennis
- Stephen Dobyns
- Denise Duhamel
- Stephen Dunn
- Beth Ann Fennelly
- Megan Gannon
- Amy Gerstler
- Sarah Gorham
- George Green
- Debora Greger
- Eamon Grennan
- Daniel Gutstein
- R. S. Gwynn
- Rachel Hadas
- Mark Halliday
- Jim Harrison
- Robert Hass
- Christian Hawkey
- Terrance Hayes
- Bob Hicok
- Katia Kapovich
- Laura Kasischke
- Joy Katz
- David Kirby
- Jennifer L. Knox
- Ron Koertge
- John Koethe
- Mark Kraushaar
- Julie Larios
- Dorianne Laux
- Reb Livingston
- Thomas Lux
- Paul Muldoon
- Marilyn Nelson
- Richard Newman
- Mary Oliver
- Danielle Pafunda
- Mark Pawlak
- Bao Phi
- Donald Platt
- Lawrence Raab
- Betsy Retallack
- Liz Rosenberg
- J. Allyn Rosser
- Kay Ryan
- Mary Jo Salter
- Vejay Sheshadri
- Alan Shapiro
- Charles Simic
- Gerald Stern
- James Tate
- Sue Ellen Thompson
- Tony Towle
- Alison Townsend
- Paul Violi
- Ellen Bryant Voigt
- David Wagoner
- Charles Harper Webb
- C. K. Williams
- Terence Winch
- Susan Wood
- Franz Wright
- Robert Wrigley
- David Yezzi
- Dean Young

==== Criticism, scholarship and biography in the United States ====
- Jason Shinder, editor, “The Poem That Changed America: 'Howl' Fifty Years Later, essays on Allen Ginsberg's poem, Farrar, Straus & Giroux

=== Other ===
- Chandrashekhar Bhattacharya, Tomake Ebong Tomake: Poems (Manaswini Publication), Bangladesh
- Claude Esteban, Le Jour à peine écrit (1967–1992), Gallimard, France
- Mohit Kailashnath Misra, "Ponder Awhile" (Booksurge Publishers)

== Works published in other languages ==
Listed by nation where the work was first published and again by the poet's native land, if different; substantially revised works listed separately:

=== Czech Republic ===
- Michal Ajvaz, Padesát pět měst ("Fifty-five cities")
- Petr Král, Hm čili Míra omylu, 2006
- Michal Šanda, Kecanice ("Chew The Rag"), Prague: Protis, ISBN 978-80-85940-75-6
- Marie Šťastná, Akty ("Nudes"), Czech Republic
- Ivan Wernisch, Michal Šanda and Milan Ohnisko, Býkárna, Druhé město Brno, ISBN 978-80-7227-252-5

=== French language ===
==== Canada ====
- Claude Beausoliel, Regarde, tu vois, Le Castor Astral

==== France ====
- Léopold Sédar Senghor, Œuvre poétique, éd. Le Seuil – Points.
- Jacques Roubaud, Cœurs, La Bibliothèque oulipienne n°155
- Jean Max Tixier, Les silences du passeur, publisher: Le Taillis pré
- Linda Maria Baros, La Maison en lames de rasoir (The House Made of Razor Blades), Cheyne éditeur

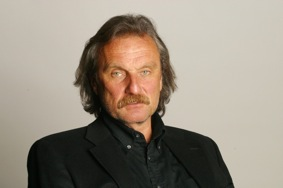
Christoph Ransmayr (Foto: Johannes Cizek)

=== Germany ===
- Christoph Buchwald, general editor, and Norbert Hummelt, guest editor, Jahrbuch der Lyrik 2007 ("Poetry Yearbook 2007"), publisher: S. Fischer Verlag; anthology
- Hendrik Jackson. Dunkelströme ("Dark Current") Kookbooks, 72 pages, ISBN 978-3-937445-18-2
- Christoph Janacs, Unverwandt den Schatten ("Intently the Shadow"); St. Georgs Presse
- Christoph Ransmayr, Der fliegende Berg, a novel-poem Austria
- Monika Rinck, Ah, das Love-Ding ("Ah, the Love-Ding"), illustrated by Andreas Topfer, Kookbooks, 160 pages, ISBN 978-3-937445-20-5

=== India ===
Listed in alphabetical order by first name:

- Amarjit Chandan, Annjall, Lokgeet, Chandigarh; Punjabi
- Bharat Majhi; Oriya:
  - Murtikar Bhubaneswar: Pen In, Bhubaneswar
  - Mahanagara Padya, Bhubaneswar: Pratchi Prakasani
- Jayanta Mahapatra, Samparka, Natuna Dilli: Sāhitya Akādemi; Bengali-language
- K. Satchidanandan, Malayalam:
  - Satchidanandte Kavithakal, selected poems, 1965–2005
  - Anantam ("Infinite")
  - Onnaam Padham ("The First Lesson")
- K. Siva Reddy, Mithi Ka Pukar, translated into Hindi from the original Telugu by Narasa Reddy), Hyderabad: Milind Prakashan
- Kanaka Ha Ma, Arabi Kadalu, Sagara, Karnataka: Akshara Prakashana; Kannada
- Namdeo Dhasal, Tujhe Bot Dharoon Chalalo Ahe Mee; Marathi
- Nirendranath Chakravarti, Jyotsnaye Ekela, Kolkata: Ananda Publishers; Bengali
- Prem ke Roopak, New Delhi: Vani Prakashan, ISBN 978-81-8143-543-9, anthology, Hindi-language

=== Poland ===
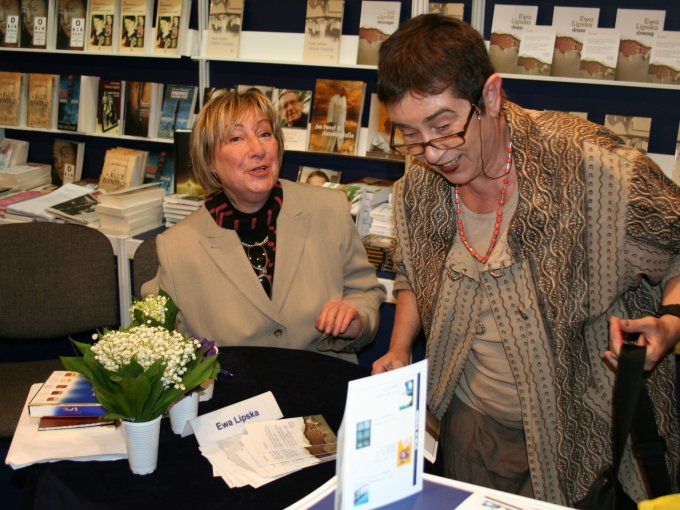
Ewa Lipska (left) at the International Book Fair in Warsaw this year

- Marcin Baran, Sprzeczne fagmenty
- Stanisław Barańczak, Wiersze zebrane, Krakow: a5
- Wojciech Bonowicz, Pełne morze
- Ewa Lipska, Drzazga, Krakow: Wydawnictwo literackie
- Czesław Miłosz, Wiersze ostatnie ("The Last Poems"), Kraków: Znak
- Marta Podgórnik, Dwa do jeden
- Tomasz Różycki, Kolonie ("Colonies"), 77 poems, 86 pp, Kraków: Znak, ISBN 978-83-240-0697-7
- Jarosław Marek Rymkiewicz, Do widzenia gawrony ("Good-bye, Rooks"), Warsaw: Sic!
- Marcin Świetlicki, Muzyka środka
- Eugeniusz Tkaczyszyn-Dycki, Poezja jako miejsce na ziemi. (1988–2003)
- Jan Twardowski, Kilka myśli o cierpieniu, przemijaniu i odejściu Poznan: Księgarnia Św. Wojciecha

=== Russia ===
- Yelena Fanaylova, Russkaya versiya ("The Russian Version")
- Lev Losev, Iosif Brodsky: opyt literaturnoy biografii, biography of Joseph Brodsky, a friend of the author, Russia
- Alexander Mezhirov, Артиллерия бьёт по своим, Moscow: publisher: Zebra E
- Aleksey Tsvetkov, Shekspir otdykhaet ("Shakespeare at Rest")
- Dmitry Vodennikov, Chernovik ("Rough Draft")
- Igor Vishnevetsky, На запад солнца ("West of the Sun")
- Ivan Zhdanov, a book of selected works

=== Other languages ===
- Klaus Høeck, Heartland, publisher: Gyldendal; Denmark Denmark
- Duo Yo, Duo Yu shixuan ("Poems by Duo Yu"), China

== Awards and honors ==
=== International ===
- Nobel Prize in Literature: Orhan Pamuk, Turkey
- Golden Wreath of Poetry: Nancy Morejón (Cuba)

=== Australia ===
- C. J. Dennis Prize for Poetry:
- Dinny O'Hearn Poetry Prize: Friendly Fire by Jennifer Maiden
- Kenneth Slessor Prize for Poetry:

=== Canada ===
- Archibald Lampman Award: Laura Farina, This Woman Alphabetical
- Atlantic Poetry Prize: Anne Compton, Processional
- Canadian Parliamentary Poet Laureate: John Steffler (until December 3, 2008)
- Governor General's Literary Awards: John Pass, Stumbling in the Bloom (English); Hélène Dorion, Ravir: les lieux (French)
- Gerald Lampert Award: Suzanne Buffam, Past Imperfect
- Griffin Poetry Prize (Canada): Sylvia Legris, Nerve Squall
- Griffin Poetry Prize (International, in the English Language): Kamau Brathwaite, Born to Slow Horses
- Pat Lowther Award: Sylvia Legris, Nerve Squall
- Prix Alain-Grandbois: Fernand Ouellette, L'Inoubliable
- Dorothy Livesay Poetry Prize: Meredith Quartermain, Vancouver Walking
- Prix Émile-Nelligan: Maude Smith Gagnon, Une tonne d'air

=== New Zealand ===
- Prime Minister's Awards for Literary Achievement:
- Montana New Zealand Book Awards
  - Poetry: Bill Manhire, Lifted, Victoria University Press
  - NZSA Jessie Mackay Best First Book Award for Poetry: Karlo Mila, Dream Fish Floating. Huia Publishers

=== United Kingdom ===
- Forward Poetry Prize Best Collection: Robin Robertson for Swithering.
- Forward Poetry Prize Best First Collection: Tishani Doshi, for Countries of the Body.
- Forward Poetry Prize Best Single Poem: Sean O'Brien, for "Fantasia on a Theme of James Wright".
- T. S. Eliot Prize (United Kingdom and Ireland): Seamus Heaney, for District and Circle
- Costa Book Awards (formerly Whitbread Award) for poetry: John Haynes for Letter to Patience
- Queen's Gold Medal for Poetry: Fleur Adcock

=== United States ===
- Agnes Lynch Starrett Poetry Prize awarded to Nancy Krygowski for Velocity
- American Academy of Arts and Letters: poets Paul Auster and Frank Bidart elected to the Literature Department
- Andrés Montoya Poetry Prize awarded to Gabriel Gomez for The Outer Bands
- Crab Orchard Series in Poetry Open Competition Awards: Moira Linehan, If No Moon
- Dwarf Stars Award: Ruth Berman, Knowledge Of
- James Laughlin Award for poetry: Tracy K. Smith
- National Book Award for poetry: Nathaniel Mackey, Splay Anthem, New Directions
  - Finalists: Louise Glück, Averno, Farrar, Straus & Giroux; H.L. Hix, Chromatic, Etruscan Press; Ben Lerner, Angle of Yaw, Copper Canyon Press; James McMichael, Capacity, Farrar, Straus & Giroux
- National Poetry Review Book Prize: Bryan Penberthy, Lucktown.
- Poet Laureate Consultant in Poetry to the Library of Congress: Donald Hall appointed
- Poet Laureate of Virginia: Carolyn Kreiter-Foronda, two year appointment 2006 to 2008
- Poets' Prize: Catherine Tufariello, Keeping My Name
- Pulitzer Prize for Poetry (United States): Claudia Emerson, Late Wife; and Poet Laureate of Virginia 2008 to 2010
- Rhysling Award:
  - Kendall Evans & David C. Kopaska-Merkel, The Tin Men (Long Form)
  - Mike Allen, The Strip Search
- Robert Fitzgerald Prosody Award: John Hollander
- Ruth Lilly Poetry Prize: Richard Wilbur
- Whiting Awards: Sherwin Bitsui, Tyehimba Jess, Suji Kwock Kim
- Wallace Stevens Award: Michael Palmer
- Yale Series of Younger Poets Competition: Jessica Fisher, Frail-Craft; Judge: Louise Glück
- Fellowship of the Academy of American Poets: Carl Phillips

==== From the Poetry Society of America ====
- Frost Medal: Maxine Kumin
- Shelley Memorial Award: George Stanley (poet), Judges: Sonia Sanchez, Joshua Clover
- Writer Magazine/Emily Dickinson Award: Nicole Cooley, "The Anatomical Museum", Judge: Gerald Stern
- Cecil Hemley Memorial Award: Rusty Morrison, "Sky Clutches Any Strong Beat", Judge: Cal Bedient
- Lanan Literary Award for Poetry: Bruce Weigl
- Lyric Poetry Award: Alice Jones, "Valle D'Aosta", Judge: Toi Derricotte
- Lucille Medwick Memorial Award: Lynne Knight, "Recovery", Judge: Grace Schulman
  - Finalists: Amy Dryansky, Somewhere Honey from Those Bees; J.C. Todd, What's Left;
  - Finalists: John Isles, The Arcadia Negotiations; Wayne Miller, The Book of Props; Emily Rosko, Weather Inventions; Judge: Forrest Gander
- Louise Louis/Emily F. Bourne Student Poetry Award: Katherine Browning, "to discover the cartography of blankness", Judge: Prageeta Sharma
- George Bogin Memorial Award: Kevin Prufer
  - Finalists: Susan Briante, Jill McDonough, Judge: Marie Howe
- Robert H. Winner Memorial Award: Daneen Wardrop, Archicembalo, Judge: Jean Valentine
- Norma Farber First Book Award: Cammy Thomas, Cathedral of Wish, Judge: Medbh McGuckian
- William Carlos Williams Award: Brenda Hillman, Pieces of Air in the Epic, Judge: Marjorie Welish
  - Finalists: Ethan Paquin, The Violence (Ahsahta Press); Aaron Shurin, Involuntary Lyrics (Omnidawn Press)

=== Other awards and honors ===
- Deutsche Akademie für Sprache und Dichtung (German Academy for Language and Literature) Georg Büchner Prize: Oskar Pastior
- Cervantes Prize (Spanish-language): Antonio Gamoneda (Spain)

== Deaths ==
Birth years link to the corresponding "[year] in poetry" article:

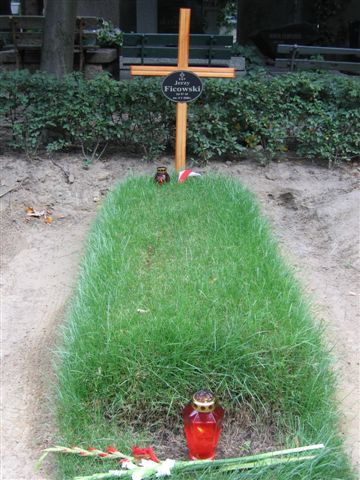
Jerzy Ficowski's grave, Warsaw

- January 4 - Irving Layton, born 1912, Canadian poet
- December 11 - Binoy Majumdar (born 1934), Bengali poet.
- February 21 - Gennadiy Aygi, born 1934, Chuvash/ Russian poet and translator.
- February 25 - Tsegaye Gabre-Medhin, born 1936,Ethiopian poet laureate, in New York
- March 3 - Ivor Cutler, born 1923, Scots poet and comic performer
- March 15 - Ken Brewer, born 1941, American
- March 27 - Ian Hamilton Finlay, born 1925, Scots poet, writer, artist and gardener
- April 3 - Muhammad al-Maghut, born 1934, Syrian Ismaili poet
- April 13 - Muriel Spark, born 1918, Scottish novelist and poet
- May 1 - Kikuo Takano, born 1927, Japanese poet and mathematician
- May 9 - Jerzy Ficowski, born 1924, Polish poet, writer and translator
- May 14 - Stanley Kunitz, born 1905, former U.S. Poet Laureate
- May 18 - Gilbert Sorrentino, born 1929, American novelist and poet
- June 9 - Enzo Siciliano, born 1934, Italian novelist, playwright, literary critic, broadcasting official, teacher and poet
- June 26 - Jim Simmerman, born 1952, American and editor
- July 5 - Lisa Bellear, born 1961, Indigenous Australian poet, photographer, activist, spokeswoman, dramatist, comedian and broadcaster.
- July 14 - Patricia Goedicke, born 1931, American, of pneumonia
- July 26 - Louise Bennett-Coverley, born 1919, Jamaican folk poet known as "Miss Lou"
- July 30 - Trinidad Sanchez, Jr., born 1943, American Chicano performer/poet (stroke complications)
- August 11 - Mazisi Kunene, born 1930 || South African poet and academic
- August 18 - Shamsur Rahman (also spelled "Shamsur Ruhman"), born 1921, Bengali poet, columnist and journalist
- August 25 - Silva Kaputikyan, born 1919, Armenian poet and political activist
- September 4 - Colin Thiele, born 1920, Australian poet and educator
- September 25 - John M. Ford, Born 1957, American writer, game designer, and poet
- October 4 - Omran Salahi, Afghanistan poet
- October 29 - Ahmad Hardi, born 1922, Kurdish poet of Iraqi origin.
- November 26 - Mário Cesariny de Vasconcelos, born 1923, Portuguese painter and surrealist poet
- November 27 - Győző Határ, Hungarian poet and writer
- December 2 - kari edwards, born 1954, American poet, artist and gender activist
- December 22 - Aristides Paradissis, born 1923, Australian poet and professor
- December 28 - John Heath-Stubbs, born 1918, English poet and translator

== See also ==
- Poetry
- List of poetry awards
