= The Best American Poetry 2006 =

The Best American Poetry 2006, a volume in The Best American Poetry series, was edited by David Lehman (general editor), and poet Billy Collins, guest editor.

The volume received some negative reviews. A review in the RATTLE by G. Tod Stone stated that "[w]hat establishment-order literati like Lehman and Collins are succeeding in doing, more than anything else, is keeping American poetry from being the best."

On the other hand, and more positively, James Owens wrote in the Pedestal Review that "[r]eaders who care about poetry need The Best American Poetry 2006. Get it. Read it. Just don’t stop there." ; writing in the Beloit Poetry Journal, Marion K. Stocking, remarked that "If a selection of the poets in Collins’s collection went on the road with their poems they should be reading to packed houses."

== Poets and poems included ==
Poet	Poem	Publication(s) where poem previously appeared
Kim Addonizio	"Verities"	Poetry
Dick Allen	"See the Pyramids Along the Nile"	Boulevard
Craig Arnold	from "Couple from Hell"	Barrow Street
John Ashbery	"A Worldly Country"	The New Yorker
Jesse Ball	"Speech in a Chamber"	The Paris Review
Krista Benjamin	"Letter from My Ancestors"	Margie
Ilya Bernstein	"You Must Have Been a Beautiful Baby"	Fulcrum
Gaylord Brewer	"Apologia to the Blue Tit"	River Styx
Tom Christopher	"Rhetorical Figures"	Hayden's Ferry Review
Laura Cronk	"Sestina for the Newly Married"	LIT
Carl Dennis	"Our Generation"	The Kenyon Review
Stephen Dobyns	"Toward Some Bright Moment"	American Poetry Review
Denise Duhamel	"Please Don't Sit Like a Frog, Sit Like a Queen"	Columbia Poetry Review
Stephen Dunn	"The Land of Is"	The Georgia Review
Beth Ann Fennelly	"Souvenir"	Shenandoah
Megan Gannon	"List of First Lines"	Third Coast
Amy Gerstler	"For My Niece Sidney, Age Six"	American Poetry Review
Sarah Gorham	"Bust of a Young Boy in the Snow"	Five Points
George Green	"The Death of Winckelmann"	The New Criterion
Debora Greger	"My First Mermaid"	The Kenyon Review
Eamon Grennan	"The Curve"	Five Points
Daniel Gutstein	"Monsieur Pierre est mort"	Rhino
R. S. Gwynn	from "Sects from A to Z"	Poetry
Rachel Hadas	"Bird, Weasel, Fountain"	The Cincinnati Review
Mark Halliday	"Refusal to Notice Beautiful Women"	Michigan Quarterly Review
Jim Harrison	"On the Way to the Doctor's"	New Letters
Robert Hass	"The Problem of Describing Color"	The New Yorker
Christian Hawkey	"Hour"	CROWD
Terrance Hayes	"Talk"	Gulf Coast
Bob Hicok	"My career as a director"	The Gettysburg Review
Katia Kapovich	"The Ferry"	Harvard Review
Laura Kasischke	"At Gettysburg"	New England Review
Joy Katz	"Just a second ago"	The Cincinnati Review
David Kirby	"Seventeen Ways from Tuesday"	Subtropics
Jennifer L. Knox	"The Laws of Probability in Levittown"	The Hat
Ron Koertge	"Found"	Iodine Poetry Journal
John Koethe	"Sally's Hair"	The Kenyon Review
Mark Kraushaar	"Tonight"	The Gettysburg Review
Julie Larios	"Double Abecedarian: Please Give Me"	The Georgia Review
Dorianne Laux	"Demographic"	The Alaska Quarterly Review
Reb Livingston	"That's Not Butter"	MiPoesias
Thomas Lux	"Eyes Scooped Out and Replaced by Hot Coals"	Five Points
Paul Muldoon	"Blenheim"	Five Points
Marilyn Nelson	"Albert Hinckley"	The Cincinnati Review
Richard Newman	"Briefcase of Sorrow"	Crab Orchard Review
Mary Oliver	"The Poet with His Face in His Hands"	The New Yorker
Danielle Pafunda	"Small Town Rocker"	The Canary
Mark Pawlak	"The Sharper the Berry"	New American Writing
Bao Phi	"Race"	Michigan Quarterly Review
Donald Platt	"Two Poets Meet"	Iowa Review
Lawrence Raab	"The Great Poem"	Nightsun
Betsy Retallack	"Roadside Special"	Endicott Review
Liz Rosenberg	"The Other Woman's Point of View"	The Kenyon Review
J. Allyn Rosser	"Discounting Lynn"	failbetter.com
Kay Ryan	"Thin"	Poetry
Mary Jo Salter	"A Phone Call to the Future"	The Georgia Review
Vejay Sheshadri	"Memoir"	The New Yorker
Alan Shapiro	"Misjudged Fly Ball"	The Cincinnati Review
Charles Simic	"House of Cards"	The Virginia Quarterly Review
Gerald Stern	"Homesick"	Ecotone
James Tate	"The Loser"	Crazyhorse
Sue Ellen Thompson	"Body English"	Connecticut Review
Tony Towle	"Misprision"	LIT
Alison Townsend	"What I Never Told You About the Abortion"	Margie
Paul Violi	"Counterman"	Shiny International
Ellen Bryant Voigt	"Harvesting the Cows"	The Kenyon Review
David Wagoner	"The Driver"	Margie
Charles Harper Webb	"Prayer to Tear the Sperm-Dam Down"	Atlanta Review
C. K. Williams	"Ponies"	The Atlantic Monthly
Terence Winch	"Sex Elegy"	Verse
Susan Wood	"Gratification"	Five Points
Franz Wright	"A Happy Thought"	FIELD
Robert Wrigley	"Religion"	The Gettysburg Review
David Yezzi	"The Call"	New England Review
Dean Young	"Clam Ode"	POOL

== See also ==
- 2006 in poetry
