= What Is a Book? =

2002 collection of essays by David Kirby

What Is a Book? is a 2002 collection of essays by David Kirby, published by the University of Georgia Press.

It has seventeen essays, all written by him and written in the period circa 1992-2002, about aspects of literature.

The title of the book came from one of the essays. Another essay is titled "What is a Critic?" G. W. Clift, in the Kansas City Star, wrote that four of the essays are "pillar essays" of the work, with the remaining ones having subordinate roles. The four key questions are regarding the definitions of book, critic, reader, and writer.

Jeff Dolven, in the Chicago Tribune, stated that compared to other books describing the history of making literature, the tone is "more personal and more contemporary".

== Reception ==
Paul D'Alessandro, in Library Journal, stated that he "highly recommended" the book, calling it "surprisingly pleasurable and entertaining to read" as well as "important and useful".

Brian J. Buchanan of The Tennessean wrote that the book is "emotionally vigorous" and "academically rigorous".

Clift wrote that he felt "a little brighter" after reading the book.

Donna Seaman, in Booklist wrote that the essays show "nimbleness and precision".

Reviewer Floyd Skloot wrote that the main points are "diffuse"; he added that the non-pillar essays give "a slapdash, repetitive feel" as those essays push away the main points and are "loosely connected".

Robert Armstrong, in the Minneapolis Star-Tribune, wrote that "flair and humor" are in the narrative and that the book is not "tedious".

== See also ==
- The Biscuit Joint
- The Ha-Ha
- The House on Boulevard St.
