= Blood Run =

Blood Run may refer to:

- Blood Run (album), a 2005 album by Unsane
- Blood Run (1978 film), 1994 Filipino action film
- Blood Run (1994 film), 1994 film
- Blood Run (book), a 2006 book of free-verse poetry by Allison Hedge Coke
- Blood Run Site, a Native American burial mound site in the United States
