= Louise Louis/Emily F. Bourne Student Poetry Award =

Poetry award for young student in the US

Poetry Society of America's Louise Louis/Emily F. Bourne Student Poetry Award is given "for the best unpublished poem by a student in grades 9 through 12 from the United States. The award is endowed under the will of Louise Louis Whitbread and Ruth M. Bourne. Each winner receives a $250 prize.

== Winners ==
- 2025: Ayanna Uppal, Judge: Megan Fernandes
- 2024: Aaliyah Anderson, Judge: Elisa Gonzalez
- 2023: Chloe Wong, Judge: Joy Priest
- 2022: Bella Koschalk, Judge: Shira Erlichman
- 2021: Dana Bhang, Judge: Eloisa Amezcua
- 2020: Dai “Debby” Shi, Judge: Chen Chen
- 2019: Vitoria Perez, Judge: Erika L. Sánchez
- 2018: Emily Tian, Judge: Jillian Weise
- 2017: Alex Bishop, Judge: Ari Banias
- 2016: Aidan Forster, Judge: Rebecca Gayle Howell
- 2015: Brynne Rebele-Henry, Judge: Aimee Nezhukumatathil
- 2014: Helen Galvin Ross, Judge: Richard Blanco
- 2013: Lizza Rodriguez, Judge: Gabrielle Calvocoressi
- 2012: Natalie Richardson, Judge: Dorothea Lasky
- 2011: Clara Fannjiang, Judge: Ada Limon
- 2010: Liya Person-Rechtman, Judge: Arda Collins
- 2009: Cyrus Grace Dunham, Judge: Matthew Rohrer
- 2008: Carey Powers, Judge: David Roderick
- 2007: Laura Ruffino, Judge: Thomas Sayers Ellis
- 2006: Katherine Browning, Judge: Prageeta Sharma
- 2005: Paul Hendricks, Judge: Major Jackson
- 2004: Zachary Hertz, Judge: Brian Henry
- 2003: Hannah Jones, Judge: Brenda Shaugnessy
- 2002: Julia Friedlander, Judge: Timothy Liu
- 2001: Margaret Wohl
- 2000: Michael Ward, Judge: Elizabeth Alexander

== See also ==
- Poetry Society of America
- List of American literary awards
- List of poetry awards
- List of years in poetry
