= RHINO Poetry =

RHINO Poetry is a nonprofit literary organization based in Evanston, Illinois. RHINO Poetry offers a print journal RHINO, the RHINO Reads! pop-up live lit event series, and monthly RHINO Reviews online, as well as internships, fellowships, and awards. The organization is consistently ranked in the top 100 literary journals for poetry in the US. In its yearly print journal, it features works from emerging and established English-language poets, flash fiction/creative nonfiction, and poetry in translation. Approximately a year after print release, all poems from the print journal are released in RHINO’s “Online Archive.” Writers submit via Submittable March–June, with monthly caps, to be considered for publication, for the Ralph Hamilton Editors’ Prize and/or for an annual Translation Prize. Writers submit to the Founders’ Contest August–September, with monthly caps, and winners chosen by a guest judge. Editors as of 2024 are Virginia Bell, Jan Bottiglieri, Angela Narciso Torres, Ann Hudson, John McCarthy, and Naoko Fujimoto. There are also associate editors, editorial assistants, Helen Degen Cohen Summer Reading Fellows, and interns.

== History ==
Established in 1976 as an outlet for members of the Poetry Forum workshops, RHINO Poetry expanded its scope in 2002 to national and international poets. The Illinois Arts Council awarded poets from RHINO Poetry with literary prizes in 2002, 2003, 2008, 2019, and 2020.

Literary Magazine Review called Rhino “an annual that anyone interested in American poetry should attend to.” It has received funding from the Evanston Arts Council, the Town of Normal Harmon Arts Grant, the Illinois Arts Council, The MacArthur Fund for Arts & Culture at the Richard H. Driehaus Foundation, Poets & Writers, Inc., and The Poetry Foundation.

Since its founding in 1976, RHINO editors have included Lisel Mueller, Martha Vertreace, Jackie White, Mary Biddinger, Chris Green, Jacob Saenz, Kenyatta Rogers, YZ Chin, and Sarah Carson, and more.

== Awards and recognition ==
The editors of RHINO – Virginia Bell, Jan Bottiglieri, and Angela Narciso Torres – were featured in New City as part of 2022’s Lit 50: Who Really Books in Chicago.

Yusef Komunyakaa selected a Rhino 2002 poem, “Skin” by poet Susan Dickman, Rhino 2002 for publication in The Best American Poetry 2003. In 2006, Billy Collins selected Daniel Gutstein's "Monsieur Pierre Est Mort" from Rhino 2005 for The Best American Poetry 2006.

Two poems from the 2023 edition of RHINO — “On the Edge of a Green Pond at Night” by Kim Wooncho, translated from Korean by Suphil Lee Park, and “A Fraying Rope” by Muyaka bin Haji al-Ghassaniy, translated from Swahili by Richard Prins — were accepted as part of the longlist for the 2025 Best Literary Translation Anthology (Deep Vellum).

As of 2024 RHINO Poetry is ranked 41 in the top 100 literary magazines for poetry in the United States by Clifford Garstang.

== Prizes ==
RHINO Poetry offers the following prizes: Founders’ Prize, Ralph Hamilton Editors’ Prize, and the translation prize.

To be considered for the Founders’ Prize, an entry fee is required per submission of up to 5 poems. All submissions for this prize are also considered for publication in RHINO’s journal and the Editors’ Prize.

Beginning in 2021, the Founders’ Prize is selected by a Guest Judge. These judges have included Ed Roberson, Luisa A. Igloria, Niki Herd, Rodney Gomez, and the 2025 Guest Judge is Cyrus Cassells.

There is no additional application process for the Editors’ or Translation prizes as all submitted poems are considered. The Founders’ and Editors’ Prize winners are nominated for a Pushcart Prize.

There is a cash prize and online and print acknowledgments for all prizes. In addition, upon publication all accepted poets will receive one copy of the issue featuring their poem and further copies may be purchased at a discount.

== Programming ==
=== Print Journal ===
RHINO's print journal is the main form of programming RHINO Poetry does through its yearly print journal. This collection of poems is selected by a large group of editors.

=== Online Archive ===
The online archive is a collection of previously published journals and selected poems within RHINO's website. Current issues will only feature the prize winning poems. Complete previous issues are available as far back as 2015 and up to last year.

=== RHINO Reviews ===
A monthly series featuring reviews of contemporary American poetry and poetry-in-translation. The reviewers are wide-ranging from published poets, writers, and teachers to avid readers, and poetry lovers.

=== RHINO Reads! ===
A reading series made up of pop-up events with featured poets and open mics either online or in person in the Chicago area.

=== RHINO Internship ===
An internship designed for students to participate in the experience of editing a literary magazine. The position is volunteer and can be done during the school year or over the summer.

=== Helen Degen Cohen Summer Reading Fellowship ===
A fellowship for the summer requiring an application targeting specific qualifications.

=== Social Media ===
RHINO Poetry is on the social media platforms Instagram, Facebook and X. There are audio recordings of select poems read by their authors on these platforms.
