= Fulcrum (annual) =

Fulcrum An annual of poetry and aesthetics
- Categories: Literary Magazine
- Frequency: Annual
- Founder: Katia Kapovich, Philip Nikolayev
- Founded: 2002
- Company: Fulcrum Poetry Press, Inc.
- Country: United States
- Based in: Cambridge, Massachusetts
- Language: English
- Website: fulcrumpoetry.com
- ISSN: 1534-7877

Fulcrum, An annual of poetry and [aesthetics is a United States literary periodical that has been published since 2002. The magazine is edited by Philip Nikolayev and Katia Kapovich. It appears once a year, and publishes poetry, critical and philosophical essays on poetry, debates and visual art. The magazine is based in Cambridge, Massachusetts.

== Major contributors ==
Well-known contributors to the early issues of Fulcrum included Pam Brown, Paul Muldoon, John Kinsella, Brian Henry, Allen Fisher, Randolph Healy, Peter Horn, Sheenagh Pugh, August Kleinzahler, George Bilgere, Charles Bernstein, Billy Collins, and Louis Simpson. W. N. Herbert and Glyn Maxwell are among the writers who have contributed to several issues.
