= Without Title =

- First edition
- Author: Geoffrey Hill
- Language: English
- Publisher: Yale University Press, Penguin
- Publication date: 2006
- ISBN: 978-0-300-12176-6

Without Title is a book of poems by Geoffrey Hill. It was published by Penguin in 2006.

== Publication history ==
It is the first book of the Hill's late writing period (post-epic).

The first book of collected poems after Hill's spiritual epic, consisting of "Triumph of Love", "Speech, Speech!", and "The Orchards of Syon" - a tragedic triad which may include "Scenes from Comus" as either a comic or at least distanced work in a four-part movement - Hill considers the appetite itself of making poetry. Can poetry exist outside epic unity? Why is the poet still called to write after having given a total message? Can a poet offer a "total message"? Touching on the man-woman relationship, the act of creation, and the preconceptions, heights and failures of his career, Hill converses imaginatively with Cesare Pavese and responds with a discursive series of meditations varying the central theme of "turn and counterturn" that as one remain, however, "Without Title".

One must not forget that Hill, an eminent etymologist, and whose taste for and fascination of the pun can be noticed since his early writings, may be drawing on several or all historical variants in the title itself. Thus, this work may purport to "have no category"; or that Hill himself - who has voiced much disappointment, publicly, in his lack of a reading public and at the time of its writing held no Nobel Prize nor knighthood from his native country that he refers to as "Mine, I say mine" (Canto 59, "SS!") - remains "Without Title".

The epic and the epic's struggles now behind him, the writing is mature as it is easier: more open and relaxed, looser and quicker, Hill allows himself to pursue freely his poetic mines. It appears as the most "accessible" of Hill's works to those who are familiar with his opus and its problems.

"Without Title" may be considered Hill's first "free" verse.

This "ease" - which in Hill never sacrifices lexical and analogical precision (although here may be more forgiving of the structural character in meter and in overall composition) - may give way to a mature voice that confronts the freedom of working outside and beyond purposed, foreseen writing (of the epic) as well as the freedom from such pressures of having to confront, to speak with and to speak "God" (multiple references to this impossibility pervade the epic).

In the "Orchards of Syon" Hill prematurely references this book of poetry when he notes that he will 'probably not' write any further afterwards. (quote?) This book, then, should be read as a refutation of this earlier preconception.

Contemporaneous with or directly following, "Without Title" should be read opposite or beside his essays "Style and Faith" which attack a definition of writing verse after he has attempted his fullest utterance.

== Critical reception ==
As with earlier work, Without Title was received as poetry that "makes few concessions", "complex at best... dauntingly impenetrable at worst," and as being "musically assured and resonant". It was welcomed as a partial return to "the appreciation of a certain gnarled, natural beauty" and it was seen that it "escapes the shortcomings of Hill's recent work". Poet Alan Brownjohn identified the following themes: "'mourning', 'unfruition', 'misconception'"

The central section — twenty one 25-line "Pindarics after Cesare Pavese" — drew particular attention; Brownjohn seeing it as "Hill at his most complex and unapproachable", but Michael Schmidt classing it as "among Hill's most sustained meditations". Clive Wilmer considered that the sequence "becomes, at times, tediously self-referential"

== Bibliography ==
- Geoffrey Hill (2006). Without Title. Yale University Press. ISBN 978-0-300-12176-6.

== See also ==
- 2006 in poetry
