= Little Richard: The Birth of Rock 'n' Roll =

2009 biography by David Kirby

- Author: David Kirby
- Language: English
- Subject: Little Richard
- Genre: Biography
- Publisher: Continuum
- Publication date: 2009

Little Richard: The Birth of Rock 'n' Roll is a 2009 biography by David Kirby, published by Continuum International Publishing Group.

It is about Little Richard.

The book's point is to explain his transformative effect on music. Colette Bancroft of the Tampa Bay Times wrote that "is not a biography", and that it is not meant to have all facets of the person.

== Reception ==
Anthony DeCurtis argued that the work is "ultimately frustrating" even though it is "engaging, intermittently exciting".

B. Lee Cooper of Newman University wrote that the book is one of two "welcome additions" to the field.

Ray of Olson of Booklist gave the book a starred review, and stated that it is "light-footed but profound".
