= The Ha-Ha =

2003 collection of poems by David Kirby

The Ha-Ha: Poems is a 2003 collection of poems by David Kirby, published by Louisiana State University Press.

Sarah Ferguson of The New York Times wrote that the title of the book both refers to humorousness and to recognizing practical jokes.

Italy is the setting of several poems. According to Ferguson, "this only heightens their distinctly American sound." Diane Scharper of Towson University wrote that the poems are characterized by "long sentences," and that she "highly recommended" the book. Visiting scholar Maureen N. McLane wrote that hooks at the initial portion of a poem characterize the majority of them.

Michael Trammel of the Apalachee Review wrote that the work is "infectious", and that "The dark and the light splice together here and throughout the book".

== See also ==
- The Biscuit Joint
- The House on Boulevard St.
- What is a Book?
