= The Biscuit Joint =

2013 collection of poetry by David Kirby

The Biscuit Joint: Poems is a 2013 collection of poetry by David Kirby, published by Louisiana State University Press.

Joelle Biele of the Harvard Review wrote that "anxiety about the role of the artist and the place of art in society" is an element about poems in this book. Publishers Weekly stated that the contents have "uncontainable positivity". Annalisa Pesek of the Library Journal concluded that the contents would "inspire laughter" and "reach" people interested in artistic endeavors.

== See also ==
- The Ha-Ha
- The House on Boulevard St.
- What is a Book?
