= Joy Priest =

American poet and academic

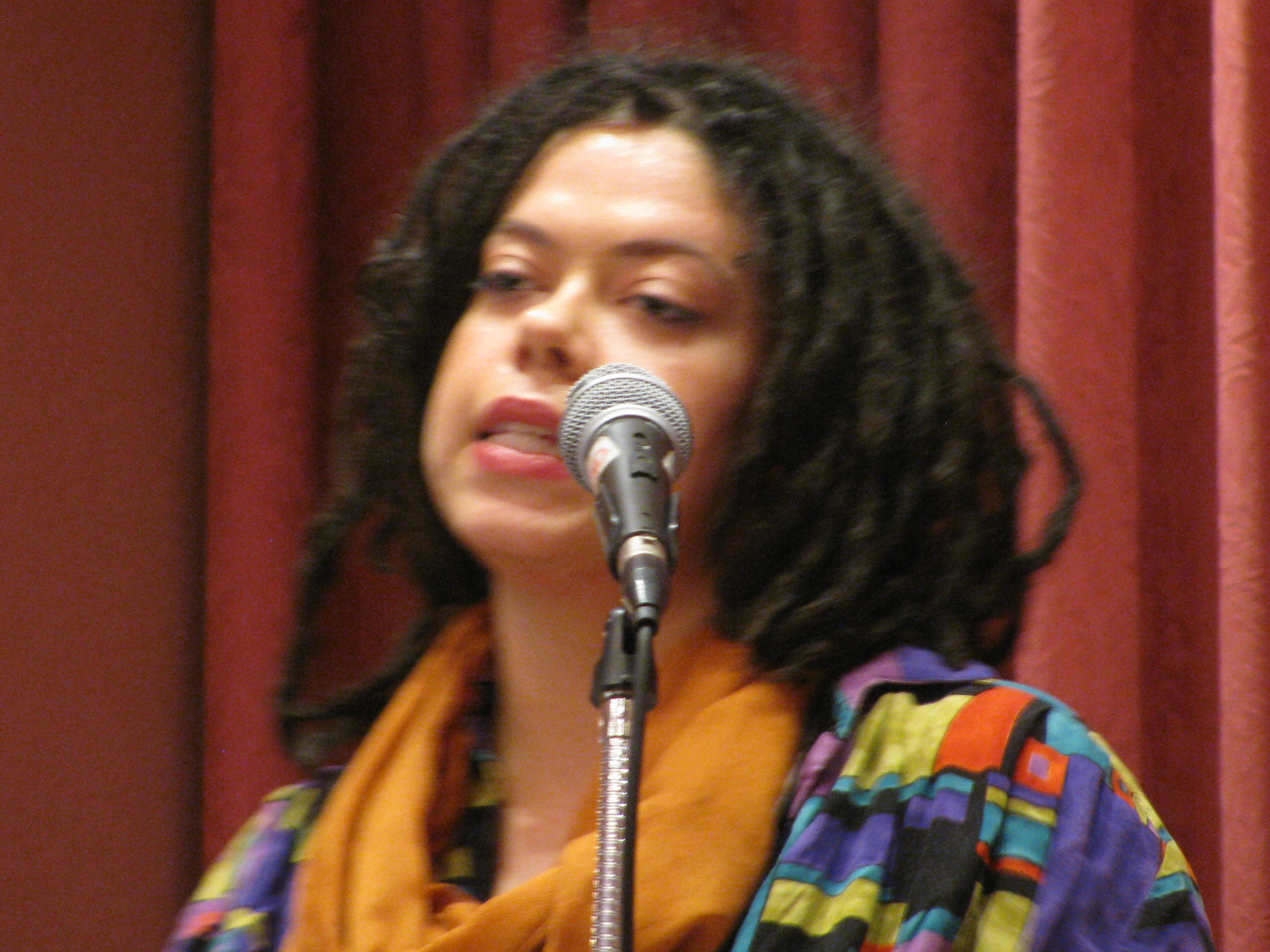
- Priest reading at Split This Rock in 2014
- Born: Louisville, Kentucky, U.S.
- Occupations: Poet; editor; academic
- Writing career
- Genre: Poetry
- Notable work: Horsepower (2020)
- Website: joypriest.com

Joy Priest is an American poet, editor, and academic from Louisville, Kentucky. She is the author of Horsepower, winner of the 2019 Donald Hall Prize for Poetry, selected by Natasha Trethewey, and the editor of Once a City Said: A Louisville Poets Anthology. She is an assistant professor in the MFA Writing Program at the University of Pittsburgh and Curator of Community Programs & Practice at the Center for African American Poetry and Poetics (CAAPP).

== Early life and education ==
Priest was born and raised in Louisville, Kentucky, near Churchill Downs. She received a B.S. in journalism from the University of Kentucky, an M.F.A. in poetry from the University of South Carolina, and a Ph.D. in creative writing from the University of Houston.

== Career ==
Priest became a member of the Affrilachian Poets in 2013. Her debut collection, Horsepower, was published by the University of Pittsburgh Press in September 2020 as part of the Pitt Poetry Series, after Natasha Trethewey selected it as the winner of the 2019 Donald Hall Prize for Poetry, awarded by the Association of Writers & Writing Programs. The collection was called "one of the best debuts of the year" by The Millions.

In 2023, Priest edited Once a City Said: A Louisville Poets Anthology (Sarabande Books), a collection of thirty-seven Louisville poets conceived in the aftermath of the 2020 Louisville protests following the death of Breonna Taylor. Beginning in fall 2023, she joined the University of Pittsburgh as an assistant professor and CAAPP Curator of Community Programs & Practice. Her second collection, The Black Outside, is forthcoming from Duke University Press in 2027.

Priest's writing has appeared in The Atlantic, Boston Review, The New Republic, and Sewanee Review, among others.

== Awards and honors ==
- 2019 Donald Hall Prize for Poetry, Association of Writers & Writing Programs
- 2019–2020 Fellowship in Poetry, Fine Arts Work Center at Provincetown
- 2020 Stanley Kunitz Memorial Prize, American Poetry Review
- 2021 Literary Fellowship in Poetry, National Endowment for the Arts
- 2023 Aiken Taylor Award lecturer, Sewanee Review

== Works ==
=== Poetry collections ===
- Horsepower (University of Pittsburgh Press, 2020) ISBN 978-0-8229-6619-7
- The Black Outside (Duke University Press, forthcoming 2027)

=== Edited anthologies ===
- Once a City Said: A Louisville Poets Anthology (Sarabande Books, 2023) ISBN 978-1-956046-08-3
