= Donald Platt =

American poet and professor

Donald Platt is a poet and professor of English at Purdue University in West Lafayette, Indiana. He is the recipient of a 2011 National Endowment for the Arts Fellowship for Poetry.

== Bibliography ==
- Donald Platt (2002). Cloud atlas. Purdue University Press. p. 84. ISBN 1-55753-228-1.
- "History & Bikinis" has appeared in Shenandoah and The Best American Poetry 2000
- "Two Poets Meet" has appeared in The Iowa Review and The Best American Poetry 2006
