= Pieces of Hope to the Echo of the World =

2006 French acrostic poem

Pieces of Hope to the Echo of the World (French: Parcelles d'espoir à l'echo de ce monde) is reputedly the modern era's longest handwritten poem, unveiled on 4 August 2006 by its author French public notary Patrick Huet. It comprises 7,547 verses and is reported to be almost 1 km (994 metres (1,087 yd)) long .

The poem takes the form of an acrostic, in which the initials of each line collectively spell out the 30 articles of the 1948 Universal Declaration of Human Rights. The display of the work was unveiled before a court official in Lyon, so that the poem could be considered for inclusion in Guinness World Records.

There remain other, far longer epic poems, such as the Indian Mahabharata and Persian Shahnameh, although these are far older.
