= Ivan Wernisch =

Czech poet and artist (born 1942)

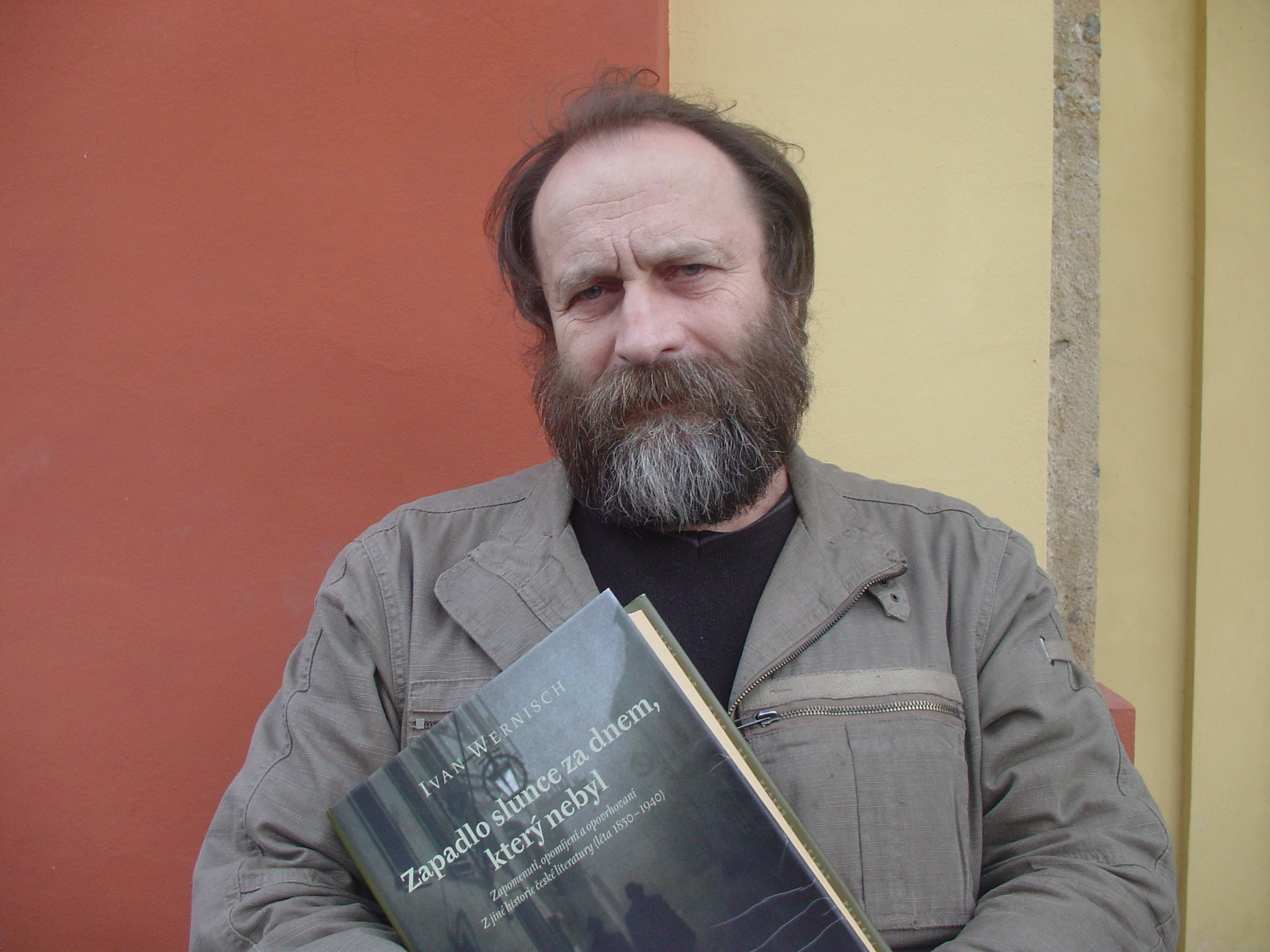
Ivan Wernisch

Ivan Wernisch (born 18 June 1942) is a Czech poet, editor and a collage artist. He studied Ceramics Secondary school in Carlsbad (he left in 1959) and has since done many jobs, mostly manual. In 1961, after publishing his debut poetry book, he quickly established himself as one of the best and most loved writers of his generation. During the 70s and 80s he prepared many radio shows about famous poets of the world (in which he often – true to his interest in mystifications – wrote many of the poems himself), but his books could not be published officially. After the Velvet revolution he worked in a newspaper. Now he works as an editor in the Current Czech Poetry Library. He is also a renowned translator from German, Dutch, Italian, Latin, French and Russian. His work as an editor is focused mainly on forgotten Czech poets of the last three centuries. Another Czech poet, Ewald Murrer, is his son. Ivan Wernisch lives in Prague.

== Works ==
After his first couple of books, which were rather playful, his poetry began to turn into more dreamy and also absurd one. His poems, full of great imagery based on neologisms, absurd landscapes and mis-quoting other writers, become increasingly sad, if not tragic, with each new book since 1989. His influences include both dadaism and expressionism.

His books were published in translations in Germany, Italy, Ukraine, Poland and United States. He was awarded the Seifert Prize and Premio Capri and the Franz Kafka Prize.

Poetry

- Kam letí nebe (1961)
- Těšení (1963)
- Zimohrádek (1965)
- Dutý břeh (1967)
- Loutky (1970)
- Zasuté zahrady (výbor z ineditních sbírek) (1984), London
- Žil, nebyl (výbor z let 1970–84) (1988), Munich
- Včerejší den (výbor z let 1965–1989) (1989)
- Frc (překlady, překrady) (1991)
- Ó kdežpak (1991)
- Doupě latinářů (1992)
- Zlatomodrý konec stařičkého léta (1994)
- Pekařova noční nůše (1994)
- Jen tak (1996)
- Proslýchá se (1996)
- Cesta do Ašchabadu neboli Pumpke a dalajlámové (1997)
- Z letošního konce světa (heteronym Václav Rozehnal) (2000)
- Cesta do Ašchabadu neboli Pumpke a dalajlámové (2000)
- Lásku já nestojím (2001)
- Bez kufru se tak pěkně skáče po stromech neboli Nún (2001)
- Půjdeme do Mů (2002)
- Blbecká poezie (2002)
- Růžovejch květů sladká vůně (Virtuos na prdel) (2003)
- Hlava na stole (2005)
- Býkárna (with Michal Šanda and Milan Ohnisko) (2006)
- Byl jednou jeden svět (with photographer Petr Hruška, b. 1949) (2008)
- Kominické lodě (2009)
- Příběh dešťové kapky (Selected poems in three volumes) (2010)
- Nikam (2010)
- Chodit po provaze je snadné (2011)
- Hlava na stole/La tête sur la table (bilingual, Czech and French) (2013)
- S brokovnicí pod kabátem (2014)

Editor of (among other books)

- Zapadlo slunce za dnem, který nebyl / Zapomenutí, opomíjení a opovrhovaní. Z jiné historie české literatury (léta 1850–1940) (2001)
- Píseň o nosu / Zapomenutí, opomíjení a opovrhovaní. Z jiné historie novočeské literatury (od počátků až do roku 1948) (2005)
- Quodlibet aneb jak se komu co líbí (2008)
- Kdo to čte, je prase (2008)
- Živ jsem byl! (2012)
- Nejlepší české básně 2013 (with Wanda Heinrichová) (2013)

For children

- Střelnice (1987)

Books published abroad

- Au jour d'hier, translated by P. Ouředník, 1990, France
- Es beginnt der gestrige Tag: Gedichte, 1990, Germany
- Cmentarz objazdowy, translated by L. Engelking, 1991, Poland
- Ausgewühlte Schriften, translated by Peter Urban, 1994, Germany
- Pchli teatrzyk, translated by L. Engelking, Poland, vol. I, 2003, vol. II, 2007
- Corre voce ovvero la morte ci attendeva altrove, 2005, Italy
- In the Puppet Gardens: Selected Poems, 1963-2005, 2007, USA
- Der alte Rabe, 2010, Germany
