= Mark Halliday =

American writer

- Born: 1949 (age 76–77); Ann Arbor, Michigan
- Education: Brown University (B.A., M.A.); Brandeis University (Ph.D.)
- Occupations: Poet; professor; critic

Mark Halliday (born 1949 in Ann Arbor, Michigan) is an American poet, professor and critic. He is author of seven collections of poetry, most recently Losers Dream On (University of Chicago Press, 2018), Thresherphobe (University of Chicago Press, 2013) and Keep This Forever (Tupelo Press, 2008). His honors include serving as the 1994 poet-in-residence at the Frost Place, inclusion in several annual editions of The Best American Poetry series and of the Pushcart Prize anthology, receiving a 2006 Guggenheim Fellowship, and winning the 2001 Rome Prize from the American Academy of Arts and Letters.

Halliday earned his BA (1971) and MA (1976) from Brown University, and his PhD in English literature from Brandeis University in 1983, where he studied with poets Allen Grossman and Frank Bidart. He has taught English literature and writing at Wellesley College, the University of Pennsylvania, Western Michigan University, Indiana University. Since 1996, he has taught at Ohio University, where, in 2012, he was awarded the rank of distinguished professor. He is married to J. Allyn Rosser.

== Personal life ==
Mark Halliday was born in Ann Arbor, Michigan, in 1949, and grew up in Raleigh, North Carolina, and Westport, Connecticut. Halliday lost his mother at the age of twenty-five. He has a son, Nicholas, by his first marriage. He is married to American poet Jill Allyn Rosser, whom he met at the University of Pennsylvania. They live in Athens, Ohio, and have a daughter named Devon.

== Literary influences and praise ==
Halliday's poetry is characterized by close observation of daily events, out-of-the-ordinary metaphors, unsentimental reminiscence, colloquial diction, references to popular culture, and uncommon humor. The poet David Graham has described Halliday as one of the "ablest practitioners" of the "ultra-talk poem," a term said to have been coined by Halliday himself to describe the work of a group of contemporary American poets, including David Kirby, Denise Duhamel, David Clewell, Albert Goldbarth, and Barbara Hamby, who frequently write in a wry, exuberant, garrulous, accessible style. Halliday has acknowledged the influences of New York School poets Frank O’Hara and Kenneth Koch on some of his poems. Charles Pitter for Zouch has said Halliday's poetry "dazzles with verbal precocity."

== Published works ==
Poetry

- Losers Dream On University of Chicago Press, 2018
- Thresherphobe (University of Chicago Press, 2013)
- Keep This Forever (Tupelo Press, 2008)
- Jab (University of Chicago Press, 2002)
- Selfwolf (University of Chicago Press, 1999)
- Tasker Street (University of Massachusetts Press, 1992, Juniper Prize winner)
- Little Star (W. Morrow, 1987, National Poetry Series selection)

Criticism

- Stevens and the Interpersonal (Princeton University Press, 1991)
- The Sighted Singer: Two Works on Poetry for Readers and Writers (Johns Hopkins University Press, 1991, co-authored with Allen Grossman)
- Against Our Vanishing: Winter Conversations with Allen Grossman (Rowan Tree Press, 1981, co-authored with Allen Grossman)
