= Aristides Paradissis =

Australian poet

Aristides Paradissis (14 July 1923 – 22 December 2005) was an Australian poet and professor.

== Biography ==
Born on 14 July 1923 of Greek parents in Chefoo (now Yantai), China, Paradissis moved to Shanghai in 1932. He studied at St. Francis Xavier's College and then business and law at the Aurora University (Shanghai). Paradissis arrived in Australia in 1949 and continued his studies at the University of Melbourne (MA 1959, PhD 1965) and at La Trobe University (MA Spanish 1972).

Paradissis was naturalised in 1955. He worked as senior lecturer in French, Spanish, and European literature at La Trobe University (1967–85).

Paradissis died on 22 December 2005.

== Works ==
- A Tree at the gate, Sydney, Wentworth Books, 1971
- The City of the Tree, South Melbourne: Taurus Publishing, 1981
- The Bing Book of Verse: Poems in Memory of Bing Crosby, Balwyn, Victoria. 1983
- Dragonsleep, New York, Vantage Press, 1995.
- The Balzac Stories: from Paris to Parramatta and other Tales, Melbourne: Adapar Creative Services, 1996
- The Shanghai Chronicles: the Day after Pearl Harbor and other stories, Melbourne: Adapar Creative Services, 1998
