= The House on Boulevard St. =

Book of poetry by David Kirby

The House on Boulevard St.: New and Selected Poems by David Kirby is a book of poetry by David Kirby, published by Louisiana State University Press.

It has some poems newly released and some poems previously released.

The book cover has a piece of artwork depicting Kirby, described by Carol Muske-Dukes of The New York Times as "a Roy Lichtenstein-style cartoon".

Ray Olson, in Booklist, wrote that the poems in this collection are "relatively long-lined paragraphs" compared to poems released in earlier collections.

== Reception ==
Mark Hinson of the Tallahassee Democrat wrote that the book "has gotten rave reviews".

Steve Kowit of the San Diego Union-Tribune wrote that the works are "captivating and full of heart", and that the collection demonstrates "how lively and personable American poetry can be".

In 2007, Ken Tucker of Entertainment Weekly ranked this book as one of the "5 Reasons to Live".

For the poetry category of the National Book Award in 2007, the book received a nomination.

== See also ==
- The Biscuit Joint
- The Ha-Ha
- What is a Book?
