= David Yezzi =

American poet

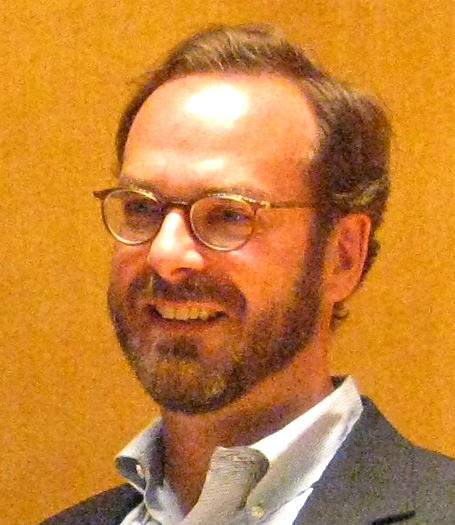
David Yezzi

David Dalton Yezzi (born 1966) is an American poet, editor, actor, and professor. He currently teaches poetry in the Writing Seminars at Johns Hopkins University.

== Life ==
Yezzi was born in Albany, New York He attended The Doane Stuart School. Yezzi earned a bachelor's degree in theater from Carnegie Mellon University and a master of fine arts degree in creative writing from Columbia University School of the Arts.

== Career ==
Yezzi was Director of the Unterberg Poetry Center of the 92nd Street Y in New York City from 2001 to 2005 and has worked as executive editor and, then, poetry editor of The New Criterion, associate editor of Parnassus: Poetry in Review, and was on the staff of The New York Observer. He is a professor in the Writing Seminars at Johns Hopkins University and a former editor of The Hopkins Review.

Yezzi was a co-founder of the San Francisco theater company, Thick Description, and has performed in works by Shakespeare, Shaw, Brecht, Goethe, Williams, and others in the United States and Europe. In March 2010, Verse Theater Manhattan presented Yezzi's evening of verse monologues, Dirty Dan & Other Travesties, at the Bowery Poetry Club, with Yezzi performing "Tomorrow & Tomorrow." In October 2021, he performed the title role in The Baltimore Shakespeare Factory's production of King Lear. He is a 2024-2026 member of the acting company at Chesapeake Shakespeare Company.

In 1998, he was awarded a Wallace Stegner Fellowship from Stanford University (1998–2000).

His poems have been published in literary journals including The Atlantic, Poetry, The Yale Review, The Paris Review, The New Republic, Poetry Daily and The New Criterion. His literary essays and reviews have appeared in The New York Times Book Review, The New York Sun, The New Yorker, The Wall Street Journal, The (London) Times Literary Supplement, Poetry and elsewhere.

Yezzi's poem "The Call" was included in The Best American Poetry 2006 and "Minding Rites" appeared in The Best American Poetry 2012.

In December 2008, Azores was chosen as a Slate magazine "Best Book of 2008." In 2015, Birds of the Air was a finalist for the Poets' Prize. Late Romance was an editors' selection at The New York Times Book Review in 2023. In 2022, he was a short-term visiting fellow at Jesus College, Oxford. He is a 2024 James Merrill House Fellow and a 2025-6 Guggenheim Fellow in poetry.

== Bibliography ==
=== Non-fiction ===
- Late Romance: Anthony Hecht--A Poet's Life (St. Martin's Press, 2023), 464 pages, ISBN 978-1250016584

=== Poetry ===
- More Things in Heaven (Measure Press, 2022), 156 pages, ISBN 978-1939574336
- Black Sea (Carnegie Mellon University Press, 2018), poetry, 74 pages, ISBN 978-0887486357
- Birds of the Air (Carnegie Mellon University Press, 2013), poetry, 90 pages, ISBN 978-0887485718
- Azores (Swallow Press/Ohio University Press, 2008), poetry, 56 pages, ISBN 978-0-8040-1113-6
- The Hidden Model (TriQuarterly/Northwestern University Press, 2003), poetry, 96 pages, ISBN 978-0810151451

=== Chapbooks ===
- Two Ranges [Vertical] by Ernest Hilbert and David Yezzi (Nemean Lion Press, 2013), hand-sewn, signed-limited concertina book
- Tomorrow & Tomorrow, with an afterword by Denis Donoghue (Exot Books, 2012), ISBN 978-0-9844249-7-9
- Such Root Satisfaction, 3 X 5 [Three by David Yezzi, Five by Ernest Hilbert] (Nemean Lion Press, 2010)
- A Fletching of Hackles: Fresh Verse by Ernest Hilbert and David Yezzi (Nemean Lion Press, 2009)
- Sad Is Eros (Aralia Press, 2003)

=== Anthologies (edited) ===
- The Swallow Anthology of New American Poets (Swallow Press/Ohio University Press, 2009), poetry, 376 pages, ISBN 978-0-8040-1121-1

List of poems

Title	Year	First published	Reprinted/collected
Sugar on snow	2019	Yezzi, David (July 2019). "Sugar on snow". The Atlantic. 324 (1): 38.	

=== Plays ===
- Schnauzer: A Play In One Act (EXOT Books, 2019), Play-In-Verse, 82 pages, ISBN 978-0989898447

=== Libretti ===
- His libretto for a new chamber opera by composer David Conte, Firebird Motel, premiered in 2003 and was released on CD by Arsis.
