= Roger Moulson =

English poet

Roger Moulson is an English poet whose debut volume Waiting for the Night-Rowers was announced in November 2006 as the winner of the Jerwood Aldeburgh First Collection Prize for that year. Michael Laskey, Chairman of the Poetry Trust and one of the award’s judges said, “Roger Moulson's Waiting for the Night-Rowers is a substantial and exciting collection, a mature distillation of a varied life experience. Admirably attentive to the world and to their own inner impulses, these are authentic and most satisfying poems. The real thing, we all thought." Waiting for the Night-Rowers, also short-listed for the 2006 Guardian First Book Award, was published by Enitharmon Press as the second volume in the Enitharmon New Poets series.

Moulson was born in West Yorkshire in 1945 and read classics at Oxford. He began writing poetry in 1995 and has been taught by Michael Donaghy and Elaine Feinstein.

== Sources ==
- Enitharmon Press website
- Guardian First Book Award website
- Jerwood First Collection Prize website
- 2006 Prize Announcement website
