= Michal Šanda =

Czech writer and poet (born 1965)

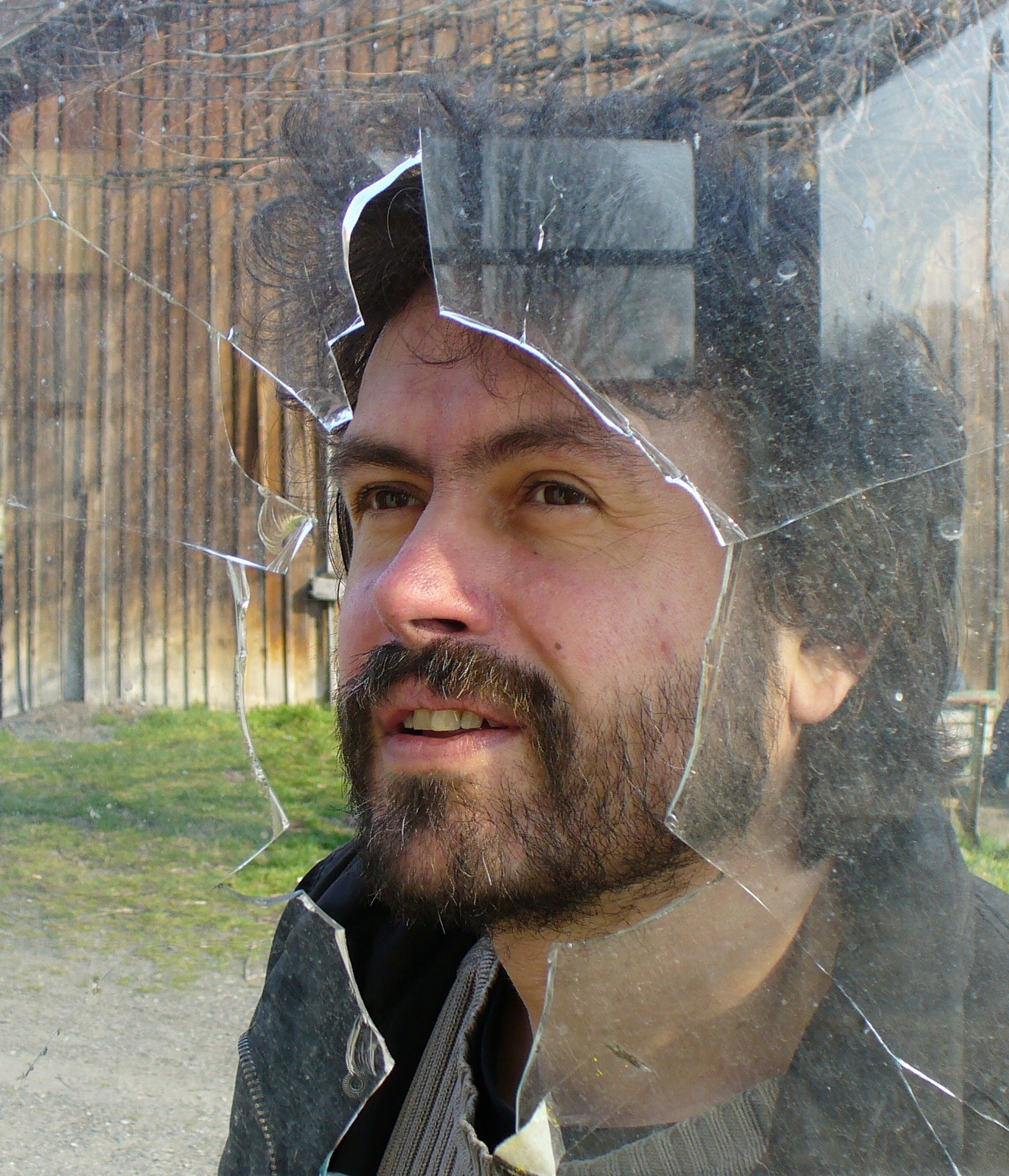
- Šanda in 2007
- Born: 10 December 1965 (age 60); Prague
- Occupations: Novelist, poet

Michal Šanda (born December 10, 1965 in Prague) is a Czech writer and poet.

== Life and career ==
After graduating from the Jan Neruda Grammar School, he changed jobs several times, and since 1991 he has worked as an archivist at the Arts and Theatre Institute in Prague where he lives.

Although he started off as a poet, Šanda is today regarded as a postmodern author because every book he writes explores a different genre and style.

== Awards ==
Bologna Ragazzi Award 2022 – The BRAW Amazing Bookshelf (“Tibbles”), Muriel Award 2021 for best Czech comic book for children (“Tibbles”), Blueberry Award 2023, an award for the best nature and climate books for kids in the USA (Tibbles the Cat).

== Bibliography ==
=== Collective Works ===
- Generál v umyvadle plném blues, Větrné mlýny, Brno, ISBN 978-80-7443-467-9, (2022)

=== Poetry collections ===
- stoa, KIC Brno, (1994)
- Ošklivé příběhy z krásných slov, Protis Prague, ISBN 80-85940-20-5, (1996)
- Metro, Protis Prague, ISBN 80-85940-48-5, (1998 and 2005)
- Dvacet deka ovaru, Klokočí a Knihovna Jana Drdy Prague, ISBN 80-86240-05-3, (1998)
- Býkárna, Druhé město Brno, ISBN 80-7227-252-7, with Milan Ohnisko and Ivan Wernisch, (2006)
- Remington pod kredencí, Protis Prague, ISBN 978-80-7386-050-9, (2009)
- Rabování samozvaného generála Rona Zacapy v hostinci U Hrocha, Nakladatelství Pavel Mervart Červený Kostelec, ISBN 978-80-7465-155-7, (2015)

=== Prose ===
- Blues 1890–1940, Petrov Brno, ISBN 80-7227-067-2, (2000)
- Obecní radní Stoklasné Lhoty vydraživší za 37 Kč vycpaného jezevce pro potřeby školního kabinetu, Petrov Brno, ISBN 80-7227-110-5, (2001)
- Sudamerická romance, Petrov Brno, ISBN 80-7227-164-4, (2003)
- Kecanice, Protis Prague, ISBN 80-85940-75-2, (2006)
- Dopisy, Dybbuk Prague, ISBN 978-80-86862-85-9, with Karel Havlíček Borovský, (2009)
- Sebrané spí si, Nakladatelství Petr Štengl Prague, ISBN 978-80-87563-04-5, (2012)
- Špacírkou přes čenich!, Nakladatelství Paseka Prague and Litomyšl, ISBN 978-80-7432-296-9, (2013)
- MUDr. PhDr. Jarmila Beichtenová: Kazuistika pacientů Michala Šandy a Jakuba Šofara – literární anamnéza, Novela bohemica Prague, ISBN 978-80-87683-28-6, (2014)
- Jakápak prdel, Týnská literární kavárna Prague, ISBN 978-80-903065-9-2 and Druhé město Brno, ISBN 978-80-7227-364-5, (2015) with Ivan Wernisch
- Autorské poznámky k divadelní grotesce Sráči, Nakladatelství Petr Štengl Prague, ISBN 978-80-87563-35-9, (2015)
- Masná kuchařka mistra řezníka z Nelahozevsi Antonína Dvořáka, Dybbuk Prague, ISBN 978-80-7438-152-2, (2016)
- Údolí, Dybbuk Prague, ISBN 978-80-7438-469-1 and ISBN 978-80-7438-472-1, (2017)
- Hemingwayův býk, Milan Hodek | Paper Jam Hradec Králové, ISBN 978-80-87688-79-3, (2018)
- Umyvadlo plné vajglů, Dybbuk Prague, ISBN 978-80-7438-227-7, (2020)
- Mozek z blázna, Malvern Prague, ISBN 978-80-7530-450-6, (2023)
- Grotesky, Malvern Prague, ISBN 978-80-7530-541-1, (2024)
- Cvak!, Milan Hodek | Paper Jam Hradec Králové, ISBN 978-80-88372-52-3, (2025)

=== Children's books ===
- Merekvice, Dybbuk Prague, ISBN 978-80-86862-53-8, (2008)
- Oskarovy rybářské trofeje, Novela bohemica Prague, ISBN 978-80-87683-38-5, (2014)
- Dr. Moul, Michal Šanda at its own expense Prague, ISBN 978-80-270-3653-0, (2018)
- Kosáku, co to máš v zobáku?, Meander Prague, ISBN 978-80-7558-105-1, (2019)
- Rukulíbám, Meander Prague, ISBN 978-80-7558-133-4, (2020)
- Tibbles, Meander Prague, ISBN 978-80-7558-165-5, (2021)
- Viktor & Віктор, Meander Prague, ISBN 978-80-7558-177-8, (2022)
- Tibbles the Cat, Albatros Media Group Prague, ISBN 978-80-00-07005-6, (2023)
- Lední medvěd Rio zachraňuje prales, Meander Prague, ISBN 978-80-7558-223-2, (2023)
- Kruh, Meander Prague, ISBN 978-80-7558-239-3, (2023)
- Hravě o dopravě, Meander Prague, ISBN 978-80-7558-264-5, (2024)
- Čtverec, Meander Prague, ISBN 978-80-7558-267-6, (2024)
- The Beatles a královna, Meander Prague, ISBN 978-80-7558-303-1 (2026)

=== Theater Plays ===
- Španělské ptáčky, Větrné mlýny Brno, ISSN 1213-7022, (2006)
- Sorento, Větrné mlýny Brno, ISBN 978-80-7443-048-0, (2011)
