= Simon West (poet) =

Australian poet (born 1974)

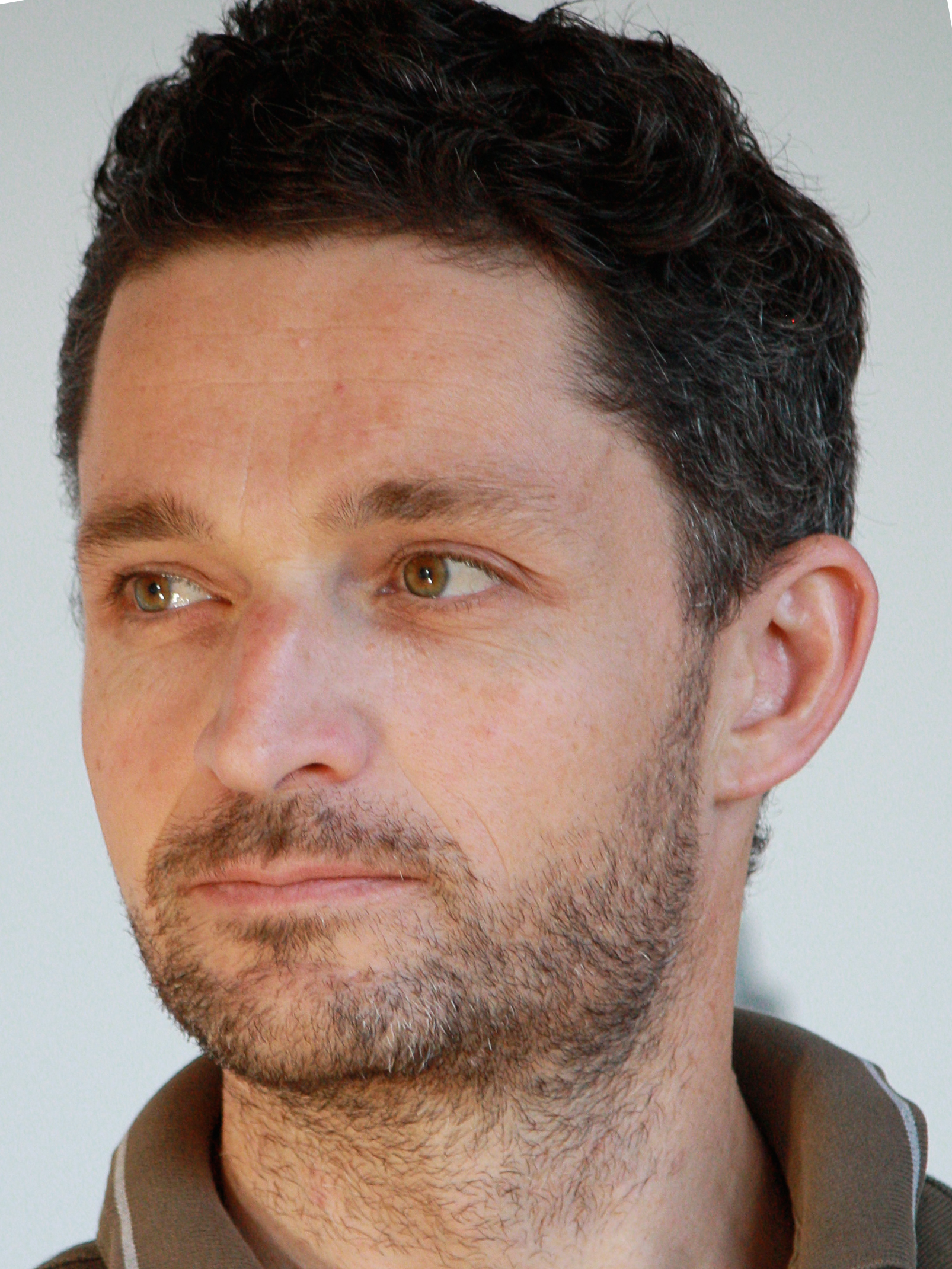
- Simon West
- Born: 1974 (age 50–51) Melbourne, Australia
- Occupation: Poet, author, writer, translator
- Language: English
- Genre: Poetry

Simon West (born 1974) is an Australian poet. He is the author of five books of poetry, including Prickly Moses in the Princeton Series of Contemporary Poets, and a translation of the Italian poet Guido Cavalcanti. He lives in Melbourne, where he works as a translator and Italianist.

== Life ==
Simon West was born in Melbourne in 1974. He grew up in Melbourne and Shepparton. He was educated at the University of Melbourne where he received the chancellor's prize in 2004 for his PhD in Italian Literature. He has lived for long periods in Turin and Rome and returns to Italy frequently. He was a lecturer in Italian studies 2007–2010 at Monash University, and has been an honorary research fellow in the School of Languages and Linguistics at the University of Melbourne. He is married with a daughter.

== Writing ==
West's poetry is characterised by the presence of both the Australian and Italian landscapes. For Barry Hill in The Weekend Australian "his poems invoke the mouthing of words, love affairs with vowels, a sense of the foreign word well digested. The mood of his Italian landscapes reminds me of the modem Italian poet Eugenio Montale, just as his two poems after Guido Cavalcanti, along with the imagist lyrics that follow, call up the figure of Ezra Pound, that passionate disciple of Italy." Later he writes, "West's graphic power is wonderful, so that you feel, in all of his language moments, of this world."

Martin Duwell in Australian Poetry Review has noted "a genuine fascination with the word, its sound, almost its taste in the mouth [and] that fascination continually alters the path of what might be, otherwise, predictable poems. The first poem in [First Names], 'Mushrooms' … demonstrates this theme of the tactility of language."

Reviewing the 2019 Carol and Ahoy, Duwell is puzzled why West should abandon the intense lyricism of his first three books for an “utterly different” mode of “post-Romantic ambulatory meditation”. Still, "really good poets" must be left to follow their own imperatives.

The reply to Duwell's puzzlement is given in the essays collected in West's 2019 Dear Muses?

For a long time … I felt that poetry was primarily, almost exclusively, a question of words, and that reality was as fragile as the language we use to describe it. I have come to believe this is a limiting notion. … The task of the poet is to scrutinise the actual world. … Poetry is animated by this sense of encounter.

Paul Kane writes that

words, in Simon West’s poems, are so lovingly proffered in all their materiality that we rejoice in the further revelations of meaning and import. All poetry is local, and West situates us in locales that are rich in resonance—whether Australia or Italy or some region of the mind where we become part of a wider world.

== Publications ==
=== Poetry ===
- West, Simon (2006). First Names. Glebe, N.S.W.: Puncher & Wattmann. ISBN 9780975240526.
- West, Simon (2011). The Yellow Gum's Conversion. Puncher & Wattmann. ISBN 9781921450488.
- West, Simon (2015). The Ladder. Puncher & Wattmann. ISBN 9781922186768.
- West, Simon (2018). Carol and Ahoy. Puncher & Wattmann. ISBN 9781925780109.
- West, Simon (2023). Prickly Moses: poems. Princeton University Press. ISBN 9780691250595.

=== Prose ===
- West, Simon (2019). Dear Muses? : Essays in Poetry. Puncher & Wattmann. ISBN 9781925780468.

=== Anthologies ===
- Plunkett, Felicity, ed. (2011). Thirty Australian poets. University of Queensland Press. pp. 255–262. ISBN 9780702239144.
- Leonard, John, ed. (2011). Young Poets: An Australian Anthology. John Leonard Press. pp. 133–134. ISBN 9780980852332.
- Langford, M; et al., eds. (2016). Contemporary Australian Poetry. Puncher & Wattmann. pp. 599–601. ISBN 9781922186935.

=== Translations ===
- West, Simon (2009). The Selected Poetry of Guido Cavalcanti : a Critical English Edition. Troubador. ISBN 9781906510725.

=== Occasional publications ===
- West, Simon. "To translate or not to translate? The salutary lesson of Dante's 'Divine Comedy'". ABC: Religion and Ethics. Australian Broadcasting Corporation.
- West, Simon (2019). "There Was Never Any Gift Outright: interview with Roberta Trapè". Tolomeo. 21.

== Video ==
Simon West reads in the Keats–Shelley House, Rome, 21 July 2012.
