= Milan Ohnisko =

Czech poet and editor (1965–2026)

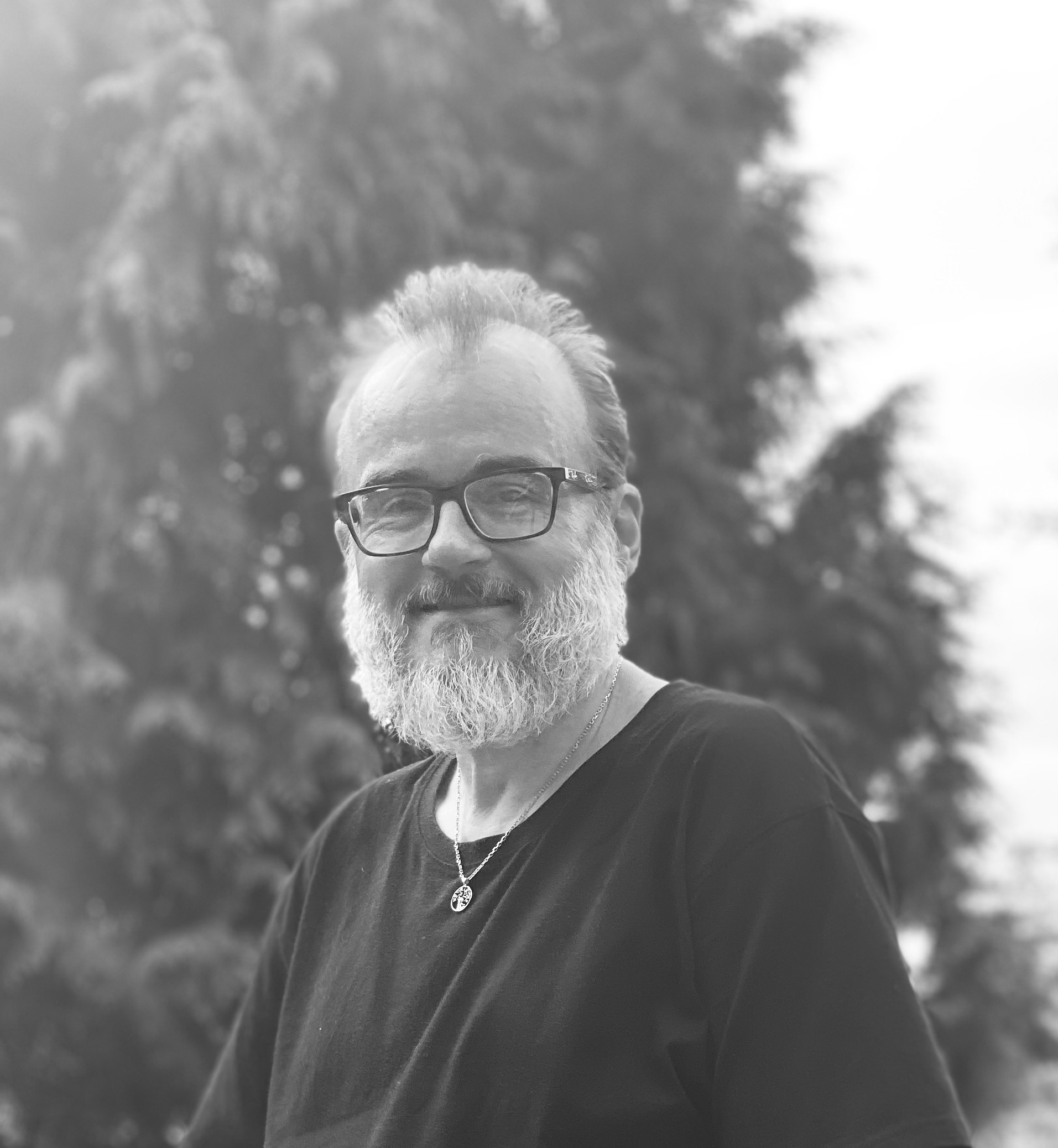
- Milan Ohnisko (2022)
- Born: 16 July 1965; Brno, Czechoslovakia
- Died: 3 September 2026 (aged 61)
- Writing career
- Language: Czech

Milan Ohnisko (16 July 1965 – 3 September 2026) was a Czech poet, editor and dissident. After quitting two secondary schools before graduating either of them he worked in many manual professions. He also had his own publishing house and a bookshop. He was one of the signatories of Charter 77.

Ohnisko's poetry is a mixture of naivist technique which uses word play with highly rational punchlines, and neo-decadent sense of tragedy and quixotism of an outsider fighting the mainstream. He often uses and combines naivety, irony, humour and absurdity.

Ohnisko died on 3 September 2026, at the age of 61.

== Works ==
Poetry

- Obejmi démona! (2001)
- Vepřo knedlo zlo aneb Uršulinovi dnové (2003)
- Milancolia (2005)
- Býkárna (with Ivan Wernisch and Michal Šanda) (2006)
- Love! (2007)
- Azurové inferno (2009)
- Nechráněný styk (2012)
- Oh! Výbor z básnického díla 1985–2012 (Selected poems 1985–2012, editor Ondřej Hanus) (2012)
