= Mark Pawlak =

Polish-American poet and educator (born 1948)

Mark Pawlak (born 1948 in Buffalo, New York) is a Polish-American poet and educator.

== Early years ==
Mark Pawlak was born in Buffalo, New York, in 1948, into an ethnic Polish working-class family. Buffalo's Polish east-side neighborhoods and the Langfield Housing development, where he lived during most of his grade school years, figure prominently in the poems of his first poetry collection, The Buffalo Sequence. He graduated from Immaculate Heart of Mary School and then attended Kensington High School. He completed is secondary education at Maryvale Senior High School, in Cheektowaga, New York, a working-class commuter suburb, where his family had moved in the early 1960s. He attend college at the Massachusetts Institute of Technology from which he graduated in 1970 with a degree in physics. While at MIT, he studied poetry with Denise Levertov. Poetry has been an integral part of his life and work ever since.

== Career ==
His opposition to the Vietnam War and to Defense Department funding of scientific research lead him to give up a promising career in experimental physics. He became involved in social justice causes and in progressive education. He taught mathematics, sciences, and creative writing, briefly on the west coast at the Santa Barbara Free School. He returned to Cambridge to help start The Group School, an independent alternative high school for poor and working class youth, many of whom were public school truants or drop-outs. In 1978, he took a position teaching mathematics at the University of Massachusetts Boston, where he taught and worked as an administrator until retiring in 2016. Post-retirement, he taught Quantitative Reasoning until 2022.

Pawlak is the author of ten poetry collections, most recently "'Away' Away" (2024) and Reconnaissance: New and Selected Poems and Poetic Journals (2016). His original poems have been translated into German, Polish and Spanish. In English, his work has appeared widely in such anthologies as The Best American Poetry in 2006 (Billy Collins, ed.), Blood to Remember: American Poets on the Holocaust (Charles Fishman, ed.), and For the Time Being: The Bootstrap Book of Poetic Journals, as well as in numerous magazines and journals, including New American Writing, Mother Jones, Poetry South, The Saint Ann’s Review, Solstice and The World. He has been the recipient of two Massachusetts Artist Fellowship awards.

The Buffalo Sequence, his first full collection of poems was strongly influenced by the poetry of William Carlos Williams and Cesar Vallejo, and by the autobiographical writings of Maxim Gorky. These lyrical poems looked back upon his formative years growing up in Buffalo but are refracted through the lens of his work with inner city teenagers in Cambridge, many of whom lived, as he had, in housing projects. The original edition of The Buffalo Sequence concluded with an essay titled “Poetry from an American Oral Tradition.” In it, he had spelled out his poetics at the time and his aspirations in writing the poems. It was an appeal to poets who, like himself, had grown up in ethnic working class communities. He urged them to resist conforming to the homogenized middle class version of the “American Dream,” and, in place of that, to give prominence to their ethnic cultural heritage—“This Land is Your Land” instead of “America the Beautiful.”

All the News, his next collection, was a sharp departure from The Buffalo Sequence. The poems, often drawing from contemporary newspaper accounts and current events, are didactic in nature, overtly political, and working class in perspective. They are influenced by the poetry of Bertolt Brecht, in particular Brecht's "Deutsche Kriegsfibel" poems, which Pawlak had translated into English. Special Handling: Newspaper Poems New and Selected, his subsequent collection fused the Brechtian impulse toward political statement with a "found poetry" aesthetic. The influences of the documentary poetics of Charles Reznikoff and Ernesto Cardenal are also evident in two lengthy poem sequences in this collection, "German Lessons", which investigates the Holocaust, and "Chalatenango", about the Salvadoran "death squads" and the massacres by the military of Salvadoran peasants. In Official Versions, Pawlak continued to explore political themes, and "found poetry' aesthetics, often with wit and wry humor. In "Hart's Neck Haibun", a series of long poetic journals that make up the backbone of this collection, he returns to the lyrical mode he first displayed in The Buffalo Sequence.

"Go to the Pine" shows Pawlak continuing his formal exploration of the poetic journal, drawing on the people and landscape of coastal downeast Maine, specifically the Passamaquoddy Bay region. Written in a hybrid form combining prose and poetry. It is a continuation of his ongoing project of "daily takes" that fuses the tradition of Japanese poetic journals written in the haibun form with the observational poetics of American Objectivist poets such as Charles Reznikoff and Lorine Niedecker, with nods to William Carlos Williams' early experimental books "Spring and All" and "The Descent of Winter." "Natural Histories" is a subsequent chapbook collection of haiku-like poems. "Reconnaissance: New and Selected Poems and Poetic Journals, 2005-2015" was his subsequent most poetry collection. Pablo Medina wrote in praise of this collection that it achieves "a consistency of vision and linguistic vigor I can only marvel at and applaud. Pawlak is among the very best poets working today." About Pawlak's latest poetry collection, Joyce Peseroff wrote, "Temperate, droll, immediate and musical, the poems collected in 'Away Away' appeal to the senses and sensibilities of life in the 21st Century."

Pawlak’s essays about poets, the craft of poetry, and poetics, and his memoirs about his Buffalo blue collar childhood have appeared widely in journals, anthologies, and magazines. And now his first book-length memoir, “My Deniversity: Knowing Denise Levertov,” has been published by MadHat Press. "Much more than the story of Mark Pawlak's apprenticeship to a major poet (Denise Levertov)," wrote Askold Melnyczuk. " "My Deniversity" is a brilliant and delightful introduction to what it means to commit one's self to Poetry, capital P."

In addition to being a poet and educator, he has pursued another career as a literary editor/publisher. After West End Press published a chapbook of his poems in 1974, Pawlak was invited to join the West End as an associate editor. He held that post for several years. He then joined the editorial board of Hanging Loose Press in 1980. He continues to serve as a co-editor of Hanging Loose magazine and Hanging Loose Press books. Hanging Loose was started in 1966 by several former students of Denise Levertov. She served as contributing editor for over 25 years and in that capacity introduced Pawlak to the magazine while he was studying with her at MIT. In addition to co-editing poetry titles and Hanging Loose magazine, he has compiled six anthologies, most recently, "When We Were Countries: Outstanding Poems and Stories by High School Writers" and Present/Tense: Poets in the World, an anthology of contemporary American political poetry. Shooting the Rat is third in a series of anthologies that includes Bullseye and Smart Like Me. These anthologies have gathered the best work by teenage writers that has appeared over the years in the legendary "high school" section of Hanging Loose magazine.
