= Joy Katz =

American poet

Joy Katz (b Newark, New Jersey) is an American poet who was awarded a 2011 National Endowment for the Arts Fellowship for Poetry.

She is the author of three poetry collections, most recently All You Do Is Perceive, a National Poetry Series finalist (Four Way Books, 2013), The Garden Room (Tupelo Press, 2006), and Fabulae (Southern Illinois University, 2002). Her work appears in The Paris Review, Ploughshares, Gulf Coast,Conduit, Barrow Street, Colorado Review, Court Green, and Verse, Slope, The New York Times Book Review, Parnassus, and Prairie Schooner. Katz was raised in Buffalo; Philadelphia; Camden, Maine; and Cincinnati. She earned a B.S. at Ohio State University, an MFA at Washington University in St. Louis, and she held a Stegner Fellowship at Stanford University. Katz is an editor-at-large at Pleiades. She teaches poetry workshops at the Chatham University MFA Program in Creative Writing. She married a playwright, Rob Handel, on May 28, 2005, and lives in Pittsburgh.

== Honors and awards ==
- 2011 National Endowment for the Arts Fellowship for Poetry
- 2005 Tupelo Press Snowbound Chapbook Prize
- 2001 Crab Orchard Award
- Stegner Fellowship at Stanford University
- Nadja Aisenberg Fellow at the MacDowell Colony

== Published works ==
Full-length poetry collections

- Fabulae. Southern Illinois University Press. 2002. ISBN 978-0-8093-2444-6. "Joy Katz."

Chapbooks

- The Garden Room. Tupelo Press. 2006. ISBN 978-1-932195-36-1.

Anthology publications

- Yusef Komunyakaa; David Lehman, eds. (2003). The Best American Poetry. Simon & Schuster. ISBN 978-0-7432-0387-6.
- Kevin Prufer, ed. (2000). The New Young American Poets. Southern Illinois University Press. ISBN 978-0-8093-2308-1.

Anthologies edited

- Joy Katz; Kevin Prufer, eds. (2007). Dark Horses: Poets on Lost Poems. University of Illinois Press. ISBN 978-0-252-07287-1.

== Review ==
Don't expect the narratives in Joy Katz's first book to resolve themselves into tidy morals. There's nothing Aesopian about Fabulae. A glance at my Latin dictionary suggests that a more apt translation of the title is "myths," for these unsettling poems conceal and reveal insights more spiritual and unpredictable than aphoristic. They resist easy expectations.
