= J. Allyn Rosser =

American poet

- Born: Jill Allyn Rosser; 1957 (age 68–69); Bethlehem, Pennsylvania
- Citizenship: American
- Education: Middlebury College, University of Pennsylvania
- Occupation: poet
- Spouse: Mark Halliday
- Writing career
- Language: English
- Notable awards: Guggenheim Fellowships awarded in 2010; Samuel French Morse Prize; Crab Orchard Award; The New Criterion Poetry Prize

Jill Allyn Rosser (born 1957 in Bethlehem, Pennsylvania), who published under J. Allyn Rosser, is a contemporary American poet.

== Life ==
She grew up in Sparta Township, New Jersey. She graduated from Middlebury College with a B.A. in French and English in 1980 and from the University of Pennsylvania with a M.A. in English Literature and Writing in 1988 and from the University of Pennsylvania with a Ph.D. in English Literature in 1991.

She lives in Athens, Ohio, teaching at Ohio University. She is editor of New Ohio Review.

Her poems have appeared in several anthologies, and journals, including The Atlantic Monthly, Ninth Letter and Poetry.

Her husband is the poet Mark Halliday.

== Awards ==
- Samuel French Morse Prize, for Bright Moves
- Crab Orchard Award, for Misery Prefigured
- 2007 The New Criterion Poetry Prize for Foiled Again
- 2010 Guggenheim Fellowship

== Selected works ==
- "Unthought", Slate, Nov. 30, 2004
- "Coming Your Way", Poetry (February 1994)
- Bright Moves (Boston, Massachusetts: Northeastern University Press, 1990) ISBN 1-55553-083-4
- Misery Prefigured, Southern Illinois University Press, 2001, ISBN 978-0-8093-2383-8
- Foiled Again, Chicago: Ivan R. Dee, 2007, ISBN 978-1-56663-763-3
- Mimi's Trapeze, University of Pittsburgh Press, 2014, ISBN 978-0822963158

=== Anthologies ===
- "Lover Release Agreement"; "Resurfaced", Poets of the new century, editor Roger Weingarten, Richard Higgerson, David R. Godine Publisher, 2003, ISBN 978-1-56792-178-6
