= Prageeta Sharma =

American poet

Prageeta Sharma (born 1972) is an American poet. She is the Henry G. Lee Professor of English at Pomona College.

== Life ==
Sharma is the author of the poetry collections Grief Sequence (Wave Books, 2019), Undergloom (Fence Books, 2013), Infamous Landscapes (Fence Books, 2007), The Opening Question (Fence Books, 2004), which won the 2004 Fence Modern Poets Prize, and Bliss to Fill (Subpress, 2000).

Sharma is the founder of the conference Thinking Its Presence: Race, Creative Writing, Literary Studies and Art. A recipient of the 2010 Howard Foundation Award, she has taught at the University of Montana and now teaches at Pomona College.
