= Katia Kapovich =

Russian poet

Katia Kapovich (Russian: Ка́тя Капо́вич) (born June 21, 1960) is a Russian poet now living in the United States. She writes in both Russian and English.

== Life and career ==
She was born in 1960 in Kishinev, Moldavian SSR, Soviet Union (now Chișinău, Moldova), the only child of Jewish parents. She emigrated from the Soviet Union in 1990. In 2002 she received the Witter Bynner Fellowship from the United States Library of Congress. Her first book in English, Gogol in Rome (ISBN 1-84471-046-7), was published in 2004 by Salt Publishing, and was shortlisted for the Poetry Trust's 2005 Jerwood Aldeburgh First Collection Prize.

Her poem 'The Green One Over There' was included in the anthology Poetry 180 (edited by Billy Collins, Random House, 2003; ISBN 0-8129-6887-5) which grew out of the Library of Congress's Poetry 180 poetry-for-schools project.

Her work has appeared in periodicals including the London Review of Books, News from the Republic of Letters, and Novy Mir (in Russian).

She is one of the editors of Fulcrum (annual).

== Books ==
=== Russian ===
- День Ангела и ночь (The Day of an Angel and the Night), 1992.
- Суфлер: Роман в стихах (The Prompter) 1998.
- Прощание с шестикрылыми (Farewell to Six-Winged) 2001.
- Перекур: Стихотворения (Smoke-break), 2002.
- Веселый дисциплинарий, 2005.

=== English ===
- Gogol in Rome, Salt Publishing, 2004, ISBN 1-84471-046-7
- Cossacks and Bandits, Salt Publishing, 2008. ISBN 978-1-84471-447-6.

=== Anthologies ===
- Richard McKane (translator) Poet for Poet, Hearing Eye, 1998. ISBN 1-870841-57-3.
- Richard McKane (editor) Ten Russian Poets, Surviving the Twentieth Century, Anvil Press Poetry, London, 2003, ISBN 0-85646-328-0.
