= Richard Newman (poet) =

American poet

Richard Newman (born March 25, 1966) is an American poet and former long-time editor of River Styx. He is the author of four full-length poetry collections – Blues at the End of the World (Kelsay Books, 2024), All the Wasted Beauty of the World (Able Muse, 2014), Domestic Fugues (Steel Toe Books, 2009), and Borrowed Towns (Word Press, 2005) – and one novel, Graveyard of the Gods (Amphorae Press, 2016).

== Biography ==
Born in Illinois and raised in southern Indiana, Richard Newman was a longtime resident of St. Louis. He has lived in The Marshall Islands, Japan, and Vietnam and currently lives in Ifrane, Morocco. He is the author of the poetry collections Blues at the End of the World (Kelsay Books, 2024), All the Wasted Beauty of the World (Able Muse, 2014), Domestic Fugues (Steel Toe Books, 2009), and Borrowed Towns (Word Press, 2005); the novel Graveyard of the Gods (Amphorae Press, 2016); and four poetry chapbooks: 24 Tall Boys: Dark Verse for Light Times (Snark Publishing/Firecracker Press, 2007), Monster Gallery: 19 Terrifying and Amazing Monster Sonnets! (Snark Publishing, 2005), Tastes Like Chicken and Other Meditations (Snark Publishing, 2004), and Greatest Hits (Pudding House Press, 2001). He is also an acclaimed songwriter.

His work has appeared in Best American Poetry 2006 (edited by Billy Collins), Ted Kooser's American Life in Poetry, Garrison Keillor's The Writer's Almanac, Boulevard, Crab Orchard Review, The Ledge (as winner of The Ledge 2010 Poetry Competition), New Letters, (where he won the 2006 Reader's Choice Award), Poetry Daily, Rattle, The Sun, Tar River Poetry, Verse Daily, and many other periodicals and anthologies. He was awarded a Regional Arts Commission Individual Artist Fellowship in 2013.

His plays have been produced in several theater festivals, including Mouths of Babes Theater Scotopia Festival in Wilmington; North Park Playwright Festival in San Diego; and Spectrum First Run Theater in St. Louis. They have also appeared in Poems & Plays, The Louisville Review, and The Hooghly Review.

Newman earned his MFA at the Brief-Residency Writing Program at Spalding University. He has taught at Washington University in St. Louis, UMSL Honors College, and College of Marshall Islands. He currently teaches creative writing and world literature at Al Akhawayn University in Morocco.

Newman served as editor of River Styx from 1994 to 2016. He is a member of The CharFlies, a junk-folk band based in St. Louis, Missouri. The band is on temporary hiatus.

== Excerpt from Borrowed Towns ==
Coins

My change: a nickel caked with finger grime;
two nicked quarters not long for this life, worth
more for keeping dead eyes shut than bus fare;
a dime, shining in sunshine like a new dime;
grubby pennies, one stamped the year of my birth,
no brighter than I from 40 years of wear.

What purses, piggy-banks, and window sills
have these coins known, their presidential heads
pinched into what beggar's chalky palm--
they circulate like tarnished red blood cells,
all of us exchanging the merest film
of our lives, and the lives of those long dead.

And now my turn in the convenience store,
I hand over my fist of change, still warm,
to the bored, lip-pierced check-out girl, once more
to be spun down cigarette machines, hurled
in fountains, flipped for luck--these dirty charms
chiming in the dark pockets of the world.
