= Lawrence Raab =

American poet

- Born: 1946 (age 79–80); Pittsfield, Massachusetts
- Known for: American poetry

Lawrence Raab (born 1946, in Pittsfield, Massachusetts) is an American poet.

== Life ==
Raab graduated from Middlebury College in 1968, and from Syracuse University with an MA in 1972. He taught at American University (1970 to 71), University of Michigan, and Williams College (1976 to present). His work has appeared in The New Yorker and the Virginia Quarterly Review.. What We Don't Know About Each Other (1993) was selected for the National Poetry Series by Stephen Dunn and was also a finalist for the National Book Award. His 2015 collection Mistaking Each Other for Ghosts was longlisted for the National Book Award and named one of the ten best poetry books of 2015 by The New York Times. The Poetry Foundation has described his work as "conversational yet precise," with lyrical meditations that trace human fallibility and doubt. In addition to his poetry, Raab has written screenplays, including The Distances (1967) and Or I'll Come to You (1968). He lives in Williamstown, Massachusetts.

== Awards ==
- 1992 National Poetry Series, for What we don't know about each other
- 2007 Guggenheim Fellowship

== Poetry collection ==
- Mysteries of the Horizon. Doubleday. 1974.
- The collector of cold weather. Ecco Press. 1976. ISBN 978-0-912946-32-0.
- Other children: poems. Carnegie Mellon University Press. 1987.
- What we don't know about each other. Penguin Books. 1993. ISBN 978-0-14-058701-2.
- The probable world. Penguin. 2000. ISBN 978-0-14-058921-4.
- Winter at the Caspian Sea (with Stephen Dunn). Palanquin Press. 2002. ISBN 1-891508-24-5.
- Visible Signs: New and Selected Poems. Tandem Library. 2003. ISBN 978-1-4177-0463-7.
- The History of Forgetting. Penguin Group. 2009. ISBN 978-0-14-311582-3.
- A Cup of Water Turns into a Rose. Adastra Press. 2012. ISBN 978-0-9838-2384-1.
- Mistaking Each Other for Ghosts. Tupelo Press, Inc. 2015. ISBN 978-1-9367-9765-3.
