= Krista Benjamin =

American poet and writer

Krista Benjamin (born 1970, Truckee, California) is an American poet and writer. Her poem, “Letter from My Ancestors” was selected by Guest Editor Billy Collins for inclusion in The Best American Poetry 2006. Additional poems and stories appear in The Sun, Margie, Minnesota Review, Pearl (literary magazine), and Phoebe, among other journals. Recent awards include an Artist Fellowship and two Jackpot Grants from the Nevada Arts Council, as well as a Literary Artist Grant from the Sierra Arts Foundation. Krista has also written freelance for numerous publications including Reno Magazine, Nevada Magazine, Think & Discover, and Above & Beyond. She lives in Carson City, Nevada, where she is at work on a novel.

She is a graduate of the University of California, San Diego, where she received a B.A. in literature, and of Sierra Nevada College, where she did the coursework for her teaching credential.
