= Julie Larios =

Julie Larios is an American author.

== Works ==
- EEK!
- On the Stairs
- Yellow Elephant
