= Blood Run (poetry collection) =

Blood Run is a volume of free verse poetry written by Allison Hedge Coke. It was published in the UK by Salt Publications in November 2006, and was subsequently published in the US in February 2007.

The book reads as a verse-play regarding the indigenous mound city on the border of Iowa and South Dakota that is today referred to as the Blood Run Site. Hedge Coke writes of the need to preserve and protect these ruins, which contain the buried remains of native people.

== Awards ==
Hedge Coke won the Writer of the Year award from the Wordcraft Circle of Native Writers and Storytellers for Blood Run in 2007. Hedge Coke was awarded an Individual Artist Fellowship by the South Dakota Arts Council to research the site and create the Blood Run volume in 2002/2003.
