= Tony Towle =

American poet (born 1939

Tony Towle (born June 13, 1939)) is an American poet. He began writing poetry in 1960. John Ashbery has referred to him as "one of the New York School's best-kept secrets."

== Personal life ==
Towle currently lives in New York City with actress Diane Tyler. He has two children.

== Professional life ==
In the 1960s, Towle became associated with the New York School, taking workshops with Kenneth Koch and Frank O'Hara. He has received, among other awards and prizes, fellowships from the National Endowment for the Arts, the New York State Council on the Arts, the Poets Foundation, the Ingram Merrill Foundation and the Foundation for Contemporary Arts Grants to Artists award (2015).

== Bibliography ==
North. (Columbia University Press, 1975)
Autobiography and Other Poems. (Sun/Coach House South, 1977)
Works on Paper. (Swollen Magpie Press, 1978)
Gemini. (Swollen Magpie Press, 1981)
New & Selected Poems(1963 - 1983). (Kulchur Foundation, 1983)
Some Musical Episodes (Poetry and Prose). (Hanging Loose Press, 1992)
The History of the Invitation: New and Selected Poems 1963 - 2000. (Hanging Loose Press, 2001)
MEMOIR 1960 – 1963. (Faux Press, 2001)
Nine Immaterial Nocturnes. (Barretta Books, 2003)
Winter Journey. (Hanging Loose Press, 2008)
Late Sketches & Studies. (Kulvert Books, 2025)
