= Alison Townsend =

American poet

Alison Townsend (born Pennsburg, Pennsylvania) is an American poet.

== Life ==
She grew up in New York. She is Professor Emerita of English at the University of Wisconsin-Whitewater.

Her work has appeared in Calyx, Clackamas Literary Review, Fourth Genre, New Letters, The North American Review, and The Southern Review.

She is married and lives outside Madison, Wisconsin.

== Awards ==
- 2009 Pushcart Prize
- 2008 Crab Orchard Award
- 2004 Diner poetry contest

== Works ==
- "Jane Morris Poses For Rossetti’s Proserpine"; "Demeter Faces Facts", Mudlark Poster No. 79, 2009
- "Spin", Rattle, July 2008

=== Poetry ===
- Persephone in America. Southern Illinois University Press. 2009. ISBN 978-0-809328-96-3.
- The Blue Dress: Poems. White Pine. 2003. ISBN 978-1-893996-61-8.
- What The Body Knows. Parallel Press. 2002. ISBN 978-1-893311-25-1.
- And Still The Music. Flume Press. 2007. ISBN 978-1-886226-12-8.(Flume Press chapbook prize winner, 2007).

=== Anthologies ===
- Pamela Gemin; Paula Sergi, eds. (1999). Boomer girls: poems by women from the baby boom generation. University of Iowa Press. ISBN 978-0-87745-687-2.
- Pamela Gemin, ed. (2003). Are You Experienced?: Baby Boom Poets at Midlife. University of Iowa Press. ISBN 978-0-87745-850-0.
- Billy Collins; David Lehman, eds. (2006). The best American poetry, 2006. Scribner Poetry. ISBN 978-0-7432-5759-6.

=== Essays ===
- The Persistence of Rivers: An Essay on Moving Water. Burrow Press. 2017. ISBN 978-1-941681-83-1.
- "Faculty Essay: The World Outside My Window - balancing teaching and the creative life", ENVISION Magazine, Winter 2007
