= Daniel Gutstein =

American writer

Dan Gutstein (born in Cleveland, Ohio in 1968) is an American writer and vocalist. His writing has appeared in Ploughshares, Poets & Writers, Best American Poetry, storySouth, PANK, DIAGRAM, Fiction, and elsewhere. He has received grants and awards from the Maryland State Arts Council. While he was teaching at George Washington University the web site Rate My Professors named him the 2010–2011 "hottest" professor in America.

Gutstein is a vocalist and lyricist for punk band Joy on Fire. He is also vocalist for the 2025 album Live at the Black Cat! produced by improvisational band Fanoplane, which features musicians Bob Boilen and Jerry Busher, among others.

University Press of Mississippi published his nonfiction book Poor Gal: The Cultural History of Little Liza Jane in November 2023. In October 2024, the ASCAP Foundation gave the book a Special Recognition Award in its annual Deems Taylor / Virgil Thomson Book Awards.

== Books ==
- non/fiction (Edge Books: Washington, DC: 2010) http://www.spdbooks.org/Producte/9781890311254/nonfiction.aspx
- Bloodcoal & Honey (Washington Writers' Publishing House, DC: 2011) https://www.amazon.com/Bloodcoal-Honey-Dan-Gutstein/dp/093184696X/ref=sr_1_1?s=books&ie=UTF8&qid=1312397094&sr=1-1
- Alt Tk (Dusie Kollektiv, Zurich, Switzerland 2013). http://www.dusie.org/kollektiv6.html
- Buildings Without Murders (Atmosphere Press: Austin, TX: 2020). https://atmospherepress.com/books/buildings-without-murders-by-dan-gutstein/
- Metacarpalism (Unsolicited Press: Portland, OR: 2022). https://www.unsolicitedpress.com/store/p355/metacarpalism.html
- Poor Gal: The Cultural History of Little Liza Jane (University Press of Mississippi, 2023)

== Selected works in anthologies ==
- "What Can Disappear," in The Penguin Book of the Sonnet ed. Phyllis Levin (New York: Penguin, 2001). https://www.penguinrandomhouse.com/books/333350/the-penguin-book-of-the-sonnet-by-various/9780140589290/
- "Monsieur Pierre Est Mort," in Best American Poetry 2006 ed. Billy Collins (New York: Scribner, 2007). http://www.bestamericanpoetry.com/pages/volumes/?id=2006
- "Merryland," in Verse Daily (2007.)
- "The Fox Who Loves Me + Other Developments in the Faunal and Floral Kingdoms," in Best American Poetry Blog Pick of the Week, edited by Terence Winch.
