= David Kirby (poet) =

American poet and the Robert O (born 1944)

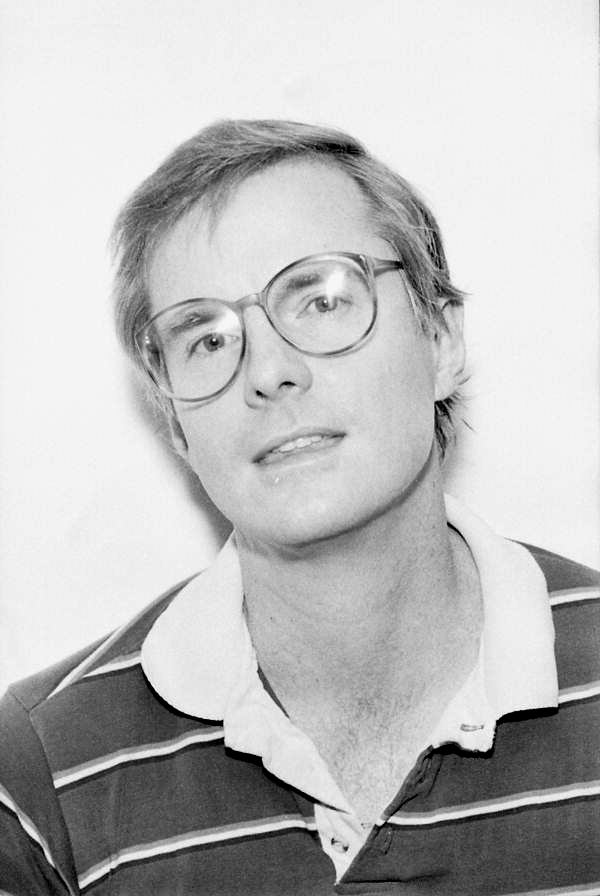
Kirby in 1984.

David Kirby (born 1944) is an American poet and the Robert O. Lawton Distinguished Professor of English at Florida State University (FSU).

== Biography ==
=== Early life ===
Kirby was raised in "the rural south" by a polyglot "medievalist college professor" father with an obsessive passion for the works of Chaucer and a "farm-girl" mother turned elementary school teacher who "taught him how to shoot her single-shot .22 and paid him ten cents for every cottonmouth moccasin he knocked off" in aid of protecting the horses and sheep on their family's 10-acre (4.0 ha) property in Louisiana.

As a child, Kirby took pleasure in wandering the great outdoors; conversing with Cajun neighbors, including "some of the oddest, sweetest people [he] ever met"; and listening to fanciful stories told by his mother "about voodoo spells and people who lived in trees." He began writing for enjoyment at the age of 5 while suffering from polio.

Also as a preteen, Kirby occasionally helped bartend for literary events hosted by his father's university department, meeting novelists and literary critics in the process.

=== Education and career ===
Kirby obtained a bachelor's degree from Louisiana State University and, in 1969, a Ph.D. from Johns Hopkins University with a thesis on Henry James. Since that time, he has taught literature courses and run poetry workshops for Florida State University's English department. In addition to teaching at the university's main campus in Tallahassee, Florida, he has worked at FSU's international campuses in Florence, Paris, Valencia, and elsewhere, supervising numerous undergraduate honors theses, masters theses, and doctoral dissertations in the process.

Kirby has published more than 20 books, including multiple poetry collections, a handful of volumes of literary criticism, and biographies of Herman Melville and Little Richard. His poems and essays also frequently appear in journals such as The Southern Review. Kirby cites Keats, Little Richard, and Dante as foundational influences on his poetry.

=== Marriage and children ===
Kirby lives with his wife and fellow writer Barbara Hamby in Tallahassee, Florida. Hamby has described the atmosphere of their household as akin to "an ongoing workshop," with each partner continuously encouraging and inspiring the other's writerly endeavors as well as periodically providing constructive criticism on works in progress. The pair have co-edited a poetry anthology.

Will Kirby, one of David's children from a previous marriage, is a dermatologist and Big Brother winner.

== Published works ==
=== Poetry collections ===
- More Than This (LSU Press, 2019, ISBN 0-8071-6986-2)
- Get Up, Please (LSU Press, 2016, ISBN 0-8071-6290-6)
- A Wilderness of Monkeys (Hanging Loose Press, 2014)
- The Biscuit Joint (LSU Press, 2013, ISBN 0-8071-5107-6)
- Talking about Movies with Jesus (LSU Press, 2011, ISBN 0-8071-3772-3)
- The Temple Gate Called Beautiful (Alice James Books, 2008)
- The House on Boulevard St.: New and Selected Poems by David Kirby (Baton Rouge: Louisiana State University Press, 2007)
- I Think I Am Going to Call My Wife Paraguay (Alexandria, Virginia: Orchises Press, 2004)
- The Ha-Ha (Baton Rouge: Louisiana State University Press, 2003)
- The Travelling Library (Alexandria, Virginia: Orchises Press, 2001)
- The House of Blue Light (Baton Rouge: Louisiana State University Press, 2000)
- My Twentieth Century (Alexandria, Virginia: Orchises Press, 1999)
- Big Leg Music (Alexandria, Virginia: Orchises Press, 1995)
- Saving the Young Men of Vienna (Madison: University of Wisconsin Press, 1987)
- A Tall Woman with a Black Eye (Kalliope: a Journal of women’s literature and art. 1998)

=== Literary criticism ===
- Ultra-Talk: Johnny Cash, The Mafia, Shakespeare, Drum Music, St. Teresa of Avila, and 17 Other Colossal Topics of Conversation (University of Georgia Press, 2007)
- What is a Book? (Athens, Georgia: University of Georgia Press, 2002)
- Mark Strand and the Poet's Place in Contemporary Culture (Columbia: University of Missouri Press, 1990)
- Writing Poetry: Where Poems Come from and How to Write Them (Boston: The Writer, Inc., 1989)

=== Biography ===
- Little Richard: The Birth of Rock 'n' Roll (Continuum International Publishing Group, 2009)
- Herman Melville (New York: Crossroad/Continuum, 1993)

== Recognition ==
In his capacity both as poet and as professor, Kirby has been the recipient of multiple awards and honors at the institutional, state, and national levels.

The Florida Arts Council awarded him four separate grants in 1983–2002. In 1985, he was awarded a grant by The National Endowment for the Arts and in 2003, he was the recipient of a Guggenheim Fellowship. In 2016, he won the Florida Humanities Lifetime Achievement Award for Writing. His poetry has also won the Brittingham Prize in Poetry (1987) and the Pushcart Prize XXV (2001), was shortlisted for the Griffin Poetry Prize (International) in 2004, and has been collected four times in The Best American Poetry (2000, 2001, 2006, 2007).

Kirby has also been repeatedly formally recognized for his work as an educator. In 1990–2017, he repeatedly won competitive awards bestowed by Florida State University and the university's College of Arts and Sciences, including being made Robert O. Lawton Distinguished Professor in 2003 and receiving the FSU Distinguished Teacher Award in 2006.

Billy Collins has stated that he considers Kirby "one of the most engaging and original voices on the American poetry scene today," claiming that he "could recognize a Kirby poem on the page across a room, just as [he] could recognize one of Emily Dickinson’s."
