= Gerald Stern bibliography =

List of the published work of Gerald Stern, American poet.

== Poetry ==
Collections

- The naming of beasts. Omaha: Cummington Press. 1973.
- Rejoicings: Selected Poems 1966-72 (Fredericton, New Brunswick, Canada: Fiddlehead Poetry Books, 1973) ISBN 9780915371013, OCLC 10810275
- Lucky Life (Boston: Houghton Mifflin, 1977) ISBN 9780395258095, OCLC 648601211
- The Red Coal, poetry, (Boston: Houghton Mifflin, 1981) ISBN 9780395305423, OCLC 6916460
- Paradise Poems (New York: Random House, 1984) ISBN 9780394537856, OCLC 10430780
- Lovesick (New York: Perennial Library, 1986) ISBN 9780060961701, OCLC 14931153
- Two Long Poems (Pittsburgh: Carnegie Mellon University Press, 1990)
- Leaving Another Kingdom: Selected Poems (New York: Harper & Row, 1990) ISBN 9780060964559, OCLC 20356513 – finalist for the Pulitzer Prize
- Bread without Sugar (New York: W. W. Norton, 1992) ISBN 9780393030945, OCLC 24174929
- Odd Mercy (New York: W. W. Norton, 1994) ISBN 9780393038798, OCLC 31971252
- This Time: New and Selected Poems (New York: W. W. Norton, 1998) ISBN 9780393046403, OCLC 37928494 – winner of the National Book Award
- Last Blue (New York: W. W. Norton, 2000) ISBN 9780393321623, OCLC 42771964
- American Sonnets (New York: W. W. Norton, 2002) ISBN 9780393324969, OCLC 48434901 – shortlisted for the 2003 International Griffin Poetry Prize
- Everything Is Burning (New York: W. W. Norton, 2005) ISBN 9780393329162, OCLC 57730836
- Save the Last Dance: Poems (New York: W. W. Norton, 2008) ISBN 9780393337310, OCLC 181139506
- Early Collected Poems, 1965-1992 (New York: W. W. Norton, 2010) ISBN 9780393076660, OCLC 449865672
- In Beauty Bright (New York: W. W. Norton, 2012) ISBN 0393086445, OCLC 789661621
- Divine Nothingness, (New York: W. W. Norton & Company, 2015) ISBN 0393243508, OCLC 869437880
- Blessed As We Were: Late Selected and New Poems, 2000—2018, (New York: W. W. Norton & Company, 2020)

List of poems

Title	Year	First published	Reprinted/collected
Nietzsche	2012	Stern, Gerald (February 13–20, 2012). "Nietzsche". The New Yorker. Vol. 88, no. 1.	
Medicinal	2013	Stern, Gerald (February 4, 2013). "Medicinal". The New Yorker. Vol. 88, no. 46. p. 67.	
Warbler	2020	Stern, Gerald (January 6, 2020). "Warbler". The New Yorker. Vol. 95, no. 43. p. 56.	
What brings me here?	2013	Stern, Gerald (December 2, 2013). "What brings me here?". The New Yorker. Vol. 89, no. 39. p. 34.	

== Chapbooks ==
- Not God After All (Pittsburgh: Autumn House Press, 2004)
- The Preacher (Sarabande Books, 2007)

== Collected essays ==
- What I Can't Bear Losing: Notes from a Life (New York: W.W. Norton, 2004)
- Selected Essays (New York: Harper & Row, 1988)
- What I Can't Bear Losing (San Antonio: Trinity University Press, 2009) ISBN 9781595340542
- Stealing History (San Antonio: Trinity University Press, 2012) ISBN 9781595341419
- Death Watch: A View from the Tenth Decade (San Antonio: Trinity University Press, 2017, ISBN 9781595347848)

== Critical studies and reviews of Stern's work ==
- The Pineys, in The Journal of the Rutgers University Library, Vol. XXXII, no. 2 (June 1969). (New Brunswick, N.J.: Associated Friends of the Rutgers University Library, 1969.) The entire issue was dedicated to this lengthy poem, Stern's first major published work.
