= Michael Simms (publisher) =

American poet

Michael Simms (born April 6, 1954) is an American poet, novelist and literary publisher. His speculative novels Bicycles of the Gods and The Hummingbird War as well as his YA trilogy The Green Mage, Windkeep and The Blessed Isle were published by Madville Fantasy. His most recent poetry collections American Ash (2020), Nightjar (2021), Strange Meadowlark (2023) and Jubal Rising (2025) were published by Ragged Sky Press. His poems and essays have been featured in journals and magazines including Scientific American, Poetry Magazine, Black Warrior Review, Mid-American Review, Pittsburgh Quarterly, Southwest Review, Plume, One Art and West Branch. His poems have also appeared in Poem-a-Day published by the Academy of American Poets and been read by Garrison Keillor on the nationally syndicated radio show The Writer's Almanac. Simms's poems have been translated into Spanish, Russian, Chinese and Arabic.

== Recognition ==
Michael Simms has a long history of political, environmental and literary activism. In 1980, he was one of the founding members of The Committee in Solidarity with the People of El Salvador (CISPES), and in 1988, he was recognized by Clean Water Action as one of the ten most effective field managers in the United States for his work in protecting the Chesapeake Bay. He held residencies at Yaddo in 1979, 1980 and 1987. From 1990-95, he sat on the Southwestern Pennsylvania Regional Planning Commission. As Executive Director of Autumn House Press, Simms received and administered grants from Heinz Endowments, the Pittsburgh Foundation, the Hillman Family Foundations, Richard King Mellon Foundation, BNY-Mellon Foundation, the Birmingham Foundation, the Forbes Funds, the Mattel Foundation, the Pennsylvania Council on the Arts, the Grable Foundation, the Eden Hall Foundation and the McCune Foundation. In 2011, the Pennsylvania Legislature awarded Simms a Certificate of Recognition for his service to the arts. In 2022, Bicycles of the Gods was a finalist for the Eric Hoffer Award. In 2023, Simms's poem 'No' was displayed in the Washington National Cathedral as part of the Dear Ukraine exhibit.

== Education and Personal life ==
Born in 1954 in Houston, Texas, Simms attended the School of Irish Studies in Dublin, Ireland; Southern Methodist University (BA, 1976); and the University of Iowa (MFA, 1978). Among his teachers were Eavan Boland, Louise Glück, Donald Justice and Stephen Dobyns. He is married to the psychologist and philosopher Eva-Maria Simms. They have two grown children, Nicholas and Lea.

== Career ==
In 1998, Simms founded the literary publisher Autumn House Press in Pittsburgh, Pennsylvania, where he served as Editor-in-Chief until 2016. He has been the lead editor on over 100 full-length books of poetry, fiction, and nonfiction by authors such as Ada Limón, Gerald Stern, Ed Ochester, Martha Rhodes, Jo McDougall, Chana Bloch, Samuel Ligon, Samuel Hazo, Sue Ellen Thompson, Frank Gaspar, Sheryl St. Germain, Judith Vollmer, Steven Schwartz, Danusha Lameris and Richard Jackson, as well as ten anthologies of fiction, non-fiction and poetry. His edited volumes have been reviewed in The New York Times Book Review, The London Times Literary Supplement, The Jerusalem Post, American Poetry Review, and many other periodicals. Simms is the founder of the online literary magazine Coal Hill Review and the publisher of the political poetry magazine Vox Populi.

Simms has won many fellowships, grants and awards for his work, including a 2011 Certificate of Recognition from the Pennsylvania Legislature for his contribution to the arts. In addition to his literary career, Simms has written and published on health, nutrition and the environment, having earned a certificate in plant-based nutrition from Cornell University (2015). He taught at the University of Iowa 1976-1978. From 1979 to 1987 he served on the faculty of Southern Methodist University; 1988-1997 at the Community College of Allegheny County; 1998 at Carnegie Mellon University; 1996-2000 at Duquesne University, and from 2005-2013 in the Chatham University Master of Fine Arts Program in Creative Writing.

== Critical response ==
In a special supplement of European Poetry, ten of Simms's poems are introduced by the British poet and translator Helen Pletts, who writes:

"Michael Simms is an esteemed American poet, novelist, essayist, editor, and literary activist whose work captures the intricacies of the human experience with grace and insight. Known for its precise language and poignant imagery, his poems show the intersections of nature, family, and the passage of time, reflecting a deep awareness of life’s fragility and resilience and offering readers a lens through which to examine their own lives and surroundings. In addition to his poetry, Simms is a prominent figure in the literary world as the Founding Editor Emeritus of Autumn House Press and the Founding Editor of Vox Populi Sphere, nonprofit publishers that champion emerging and underrepresented voices in literature. Simms’s poetry collections, including Jubal Rising, showcase his mastery of lyricism and narrative, blending personal reflection with broader societal themes. Through his writing and his tireless advocacy for literature, Michael Simms continues to leave an indelible mark on contemporary American poetry and publishing.”

Paul Schwartz (Yale PhD in French literature and the former dean of American University in Aix-en-Provence) has compared Simms to Victor Hugo:

"So, this is what you get when a perceptive, sensitive, and trans-formative poet tries his hand at wizards and warriors / dungeons and dragons: an imperfect, occasionally buffoonish, and self-doubting wizard, a dragon who is centuries ahead of her human antagonists evolutionarily, and a strategically talented and fierce feminist warrior who nonetheless comes to question her battlefield triumphs. We happily accompany this trio and their faithful followers through victory and defeat, across strange, enchanted landscapes, as they struggle against evil, treacherous foes to make the world better by restoring peace, tranquility, and prosperity."

Regarding Simms' collection American Ash, the poet and critic Chard deNiord writes:

"Michael Simms lays bare his personal history in American Ash with formidable honesty and direct speech, testifying with “a cold eye” to both the heuristic and cathartic power of poetry. In speech that’s direct, lyrical, spontaneous, raw, and expansive, Simms braves a wide array of subjects that range from his sister’s suicide, the 1982 El Calabozo massacre in El Salvador, a Vietnam vet’s memory of a slaughter of innocents, and the demise of the American Ash, to mention only a few. And there are ecstatic poems as well in which such immense particulars as the marriage bed, evening, Simms’ robust son, and the hummingbird betray a heroic magnanimity. With a beat-like voice that’s spontaneous, raw, and irrepressible, Simms writes with the courage of a witness and the wisdom of a survivor. These poems leap, lament, pierce, transcend, delve, witness, praise, and testify to the curative power of poetry."

Regarding Simms' collection Nightjar, the poet and classicist Rachel Hadas writes:

“This powerful collection offers personal and global truths that are hard to say out loud; one poem even helpfully coins the words we need. But all the words deployed by Michael Simms are honest and urgent. ‘The Ruins,’ ‘Flood and Fire,’ and the title poem recall the darkly vatic voice of Brecht’s late lyrics. Yet, Simms always sounds like himself: plainspoken, intimate, vulnerable, courageous. Both heartening and heartbreaking, Nightjar is an irreplaceable book.”

Regarding Simms's writing, the late Peter Makuck wrote:

"Whether Michael Simms is writing an essay about growing up with autism or poems about our dying planet, a barfight, or the mystery of a hummingbird's radiance, he is a master storyteller whose narratives hold memorable moments full of fresh and telling details that unlock the heart."

Writing for The Minderbinder Review of Books, Ariana Mohajeri Petersen writes about Bicycles of the Gods:

"A devilishly conceived satire that mashes the soft-centered potato of religion with the ham-fisted yam of politics into a steaming mush of mock-turtle soup which might have easily been concocted by Nathaniel West had he heeded his doctor’s advice and cooked a bit more with hallucinogenic mushrooms."

== Books ==
Poetry Collections

- Cities I Can Never Return to (Princeton, New Jersey: Ragged Sky Press, 2026)
- Jubal Rising (Princeton, New Jersey: Ragged Sky Press, 2025)
- Strange Meadowlark (Princeton, New Jersey: Ragged Sky Press, 2023)
- Nightjar (Princeton, New Jersey: Ragged Sky Press, 2021)
- American Ash (Princeton, New Jersey: Ragged Sky Press, 2020)
- Black Stone (Pittsburgh, Pennsylvania: Monkey Sea Editions, 2009)
- The Happiness of Animals (Pittsburgh, Pennsylvania: Monkey Sea Editions, 2006)
- The Fire-eater (Dallas, Texas: Firewheel Press, 1989)
- Migration (Portland, Oregon: Breitenbush Books, 1985)
- Notes on Continuing Light (Des Moines, Iowa: Blue Buildings, 1981)

Novels

The Divine Comedy

- The Canticle of Light and Dark (Lake Dallas, Texas: Madville Publishing, 2027)
- The Hummingbird War (Lake Dallas, Texas: Madville Publishing, 2026)
- Bicycles of the Gods (Lake Dallas, Texas: Madville Publishing, 2022)

The Talon Trilogy

- The Blessed Isle (Lake Dallas, Texas: Madville Publishing, 2025)
- Windkeep (Lake Dallas, Texas: Madville Publishing, 2024)
- The Green Mage (Lake Dallas, Texas: Madville Publishing, 2023)

Nonfiction

- Longman Dictionary of Poetic Terms (co-author with Jack Myers, New York: Longman, 1989)
- Longman Dictionary and Handbook of Poetry, (co-author with Jack Myers, New York: Longman, 1985)

Anthologies Edited

- The Autumn House Anthology of Contemporary American Poetry (Pittsburgh: Autumn House Press, 2011, 2015, 2017)
- O. Henry’s Texas Stories (co-editor with Marian McClintock, Dallas: Stillpoint Press, 1986)

Selected Anthology publications

- "The Rock Garden" (45 line poem) by Michael Simms featured in The Book of Jobs: Poems About Work edited by Erin Murphy (ONE ART and Penn State University, 2025).
- "Original Sin" (300+ line poem) by Michael Simms featured in In Sheep's Clothing: The Idolatry of White Christian Nationalism edited by George Yancy and Bill Bywater (Rowman & Littlefield, London, 2024).
- "Forward Avenue Blues (for Katherine Dunham)" (66 line poem) by Michael Simms featured in Jazz and Literature edited by Maria Antónia Lima and Mia Funk, Routledge, New York & Abingon, UK, 2025
- "Sunstar" and "More" by Michael Simms featured in "Love is for All of Us: Poems of Tenderness and Belonging" edited by James Crews (Storey Publishing, North Adams, Massachusetts, 2023)
- "Sometimes I Wake Early" by Michael Simms featured in The Wonder of Small Things: Poems of Peace and Renewal edited by James Crews (Storey Publishing, North Adams, Massachusetts, 2023)
- "The Summer You Learned to Swim" by Michael Simms featured in The Path to Kindness: Poems of Connection and Joy edited by James Crews (Storey Publishing, North Adams, Massachusetts, 2022)

== Sources ==
Contemporary Authors Online. The Gale Group, 2003. PEN (Permanent Entry Number): 0000149473. Updated annually.
