= Ann Townsend =

American poet and essayist

Ann Townsend (born December 5, 1962) is an American poet and essayist. She is the co-founder of VIDA: Women in the Literary Arts and a professor of English and director of the creative writing at Denison University, She has published three original poetry collections and co-edited a collection of lyric poems.

== Early life ==
Townsend was born and raised in Pittsburgh, Pennsylvania. She received her B.A. at Denison University in 1985. Townsend attended Ohio State University, where she received an M.A. and Ph.D.

== Career ==
Since 1992 Townsend has taught modern and contemporary poetry, creative writing, and literary translation at Denison University. She has also taught in the low-residency MFA program at Carlow University.

Her poetry and essays have appeared in such magazines as Poetry, The American Poetry Review, The Paris Review, and The Nation, among others. She has received fellowships from the Lannan Foundation, The National Endowment for the Arts, and the Ohio Arts Council, and is a winner of the Discovery Prize from The Nation. Her poems have been anthologized in American Poetry: The Next Generation (2000), The Bread Loaf Anthology of New American Poets (2000), The Extraordinary Tide: New Poetry by American Women (2001), and Legitimate Dangers: American Poets of the New Century (2006).

Her poetry collections include Dime Store Erotics (1998), The Coronary Garden (2005), and Dear Delinquent (2019). She is the co-editor, with David Baker, of the collection Radiant Lyre: Essays on Lyric Poetry (2007).

In August 2009, Townsend, along with notable American poets Erin Belieu and Cate Marvin, cofounded the national feminist organization VIDA: Women In Literary Arts. Since its founding, VIDA has published an annual report on the status of women writers by tabulating and comparing rates of publication between male and female authors. The VIDA survey, known as the VIDA Count, is the first of its kind and highlights the ways in which gender bias affects American literary publishing. In 2016, Townsend, Belieu and Marvin were the recipients of the Barnes and Noble Writers for Writers Prize, given in recognition of their work on behalf of the larger literary community.

== Awards and honors ==
- The Discovery/The Nation Prize. 1994.
- Individual Artists Fellowship, The Ohio Arts Council. 1996.
- Individual Artists Fellowship, The National Endowment for the Arts. 2004
- Lannan Foundation Residency Fellowship. 2014.
- Barnes and Noble Writers for Writers Prize. 2016.

== Works ==
=== Collections of poetry ===
- Dime Store Erotics. Silverfish Review Press. 1998. ISBN 978-1878851116
- The Coronary Garden. Sarabande Books. 2005. ISBN 978-1932511093
- Dear Delinquent. Sarabande Books. 2019. ISBN 978-1946448347

=== Edited collection ===
- Radiant Lyre: Essays on Lyric Poems (with David Baker). Graywolf Press. 2007. ISBN 978-1555974602

=== Works anthologized ===
- The Pushcart Prize XX. 1996. ISBN 978-0916366636
- American Poetry: The Next Generation. 2000. ISBN 978-0887483431
- The Bread Loaf Anthology of New American Poets. 2000. ISBN 978-0874519648
- The Extraordinary Tide: New Poetry by American Women. 2001. ISBN 978-0231119634
- The Eye of the Poet: Six Views of the Art and Craft of Poetry. 2002. ISBN 978-0195132557
- Legitimate Dangers: American Poets of the New Century. 2006. ISBN 978-1932511291
- The Book of Irish American Poetry from the Eighteenth Century to the Present. 2007 ISBN 978-0268042301
