= VIDA: Women in Literary Arts =

Feminist literary organization

VIDA: Women in Literary Arts is a non-profit feminist organization, based in the United States, committed to creating transparency around the lack of gender parity in the literary landscape and to amplifying historically-marginalized voices, including people of color; writers with disabilities; and queer, trans and gender-nonconforming individuals.

== History ==
VIDA began when Cate Marvin sent a handful of women writers an email that questioned the current state of women in literature. Together with Erin Belieu and Ann Townsend, VIDA was founded to address this in 2009. Marvin, Belieu, and Townsend resigned from the board in 2015.

The previous executive committee included Melissa Febos, Amy King, Krista Manrique, Lynn Melnick, and Camille Rankine.

The board of directors has included Gabrielle Bellot, Holly Burdorff, Hafizah Geter, Trace Peterson, Daniel E. Pritchard, and Metta Sama.

The advisory board until 2018 included Jennifer Baumgardner, Soraya Chemaly, Jodi Picoult, Corinne Segal, Cheryl Strayed, Jennifer Weiner, and Jamia Wilson.

== The Count ==
The Count began as a yearly inventory documenting the number of women and men who were published in, or had their books reviewed by, notable literary magazines. The Count was first performed, and the results published, in 2010. The collected data showed significantly lower numbers of women than men had been published or had their books reviewed by notable literary magazines.

The VIDA Count has revealed major imbalances at premiere publications both in the US and abroad. For example, the inaugural count determined The New York Review of Books covered a total of 306 books by men in 2010 and only 59 books by women, and that The New York Times Book Review covered 524 books by men compared to 283 by women.

The first VIDA Count encompassed fifteen major journals and publications, plus 81 editions of three Best American anthologies—including an overall Count for each of the series’ three separate anthology imprints from the years 1986–2010—for a total of 94 journals, publications, and presses. VIDA expanded the scope of the Count in 2013, adding a new Larger Literary Landscape Count that examined dozens of historically well-established literary magazines. The 2014 VIDA Count results included the first Women of Color Count. The following year, VIDA further expanded the Intersectional Count, which included self-reported demographic information regarding gender, race and ethnicity, sexuality identity, age, education, and disability.

=== Reactions ===
Responses to the Count have been widely varied, and VIDA's pie charts have been reproduced in many periodicals and journals. The conversation spurred by VIDA's Count has been explained in Mother Jones.

Some magazines, such as Granta, Tin House, and Boston Review, have responded to The Count by making a conscious effort to remedy their gender disparity. Not only do the editors of these publications say that they are making these efforts, but the numbers of the Count show this to be the case.

The Count has also inspired some activism by individuals, such as Lorraine Berry, who, in response to Harper's highly disparate numbers for three years running, published her letter "Why I’m Canceling My Subscription: An Open Letter to 'Harper's' from a Loyal Reader." In this letter, Berry details her history as a Harper's subscriber, including how much she has enjoyed reading it and how much she has been inspired by it. She goes on to say how disheartened she was to see that Harper's has failed to do anything to correct the gender disparity in their publication, and that she will be cancelling her subscription as a result.

Some magazines, such as The Coffin Factory, have openly and bluntly criticized VIDA for the Count, claiming that the questions asked by VIDA, and the methods used to come to the conclusion that there is gender disparity in the publishing world, are flawed. The most common criticism of VIDA's methods is that the numbers do not include information on how many submissions are made to each magazine by men and women respectively. The assertion is that if there is a disparity in the number of submissions by men versus women, then the presence of a disparity in published work makes sense and is not evidence of gender bias. VIDA contributor and poet Danielle Pafunda responded to this concern in her article, "Why the Submissions Numbers Don't Count." Here, she details seven reasons why submissions numbers are ultimately irrelevant.

== Critical reception ==
VIDA has been publishing original content on its website since it began. In May 2012, edited by Rosebud Ben-Oni and Arisa White, VIDA: Women in Literary Arts launched their online forum and blog "Her Kind," taking its name from the Anne Sexton poem "Her Kind". Her Kind retired in 2014 and archived its articles and essays on the organization's website, which continues to publish up-to-date content. In 2016, VIDA announced the VIDA Review, a formal name for its web content, which features original interviews, articles, and essays from an intersectional feminist and womanist perspective on the literary world, publishing, education, and the arts. VIDA Review is edited by Amy King and the managing editor is Marcelle Heath. Columns include "Reports from the Field", which calls out sexism, harassment and misogyny in the literary community; "Curating with Compassion"; "VIDA Reads with Writers"; and VIDA Voices & Views, a video and audio podcast produced and hosted by Melissa Studdard.

== #saferLIT ==
In 2018, VIDA launched the #saferLIT initiative to create awareness and action in the literary world around the issues of sexual harassment, coercion, and assault. VIDA will create guidelines and develop a pledge that address conduct at conferences, residencies, workshops, panels, and literary events, and with organizations, presses, and writing programs.

== Similar organizations ==
Canadian Women in Literary Arts (CWILA) is "an inclusive national literary organization for people who share feminist values and see the importance of strong and active female perspectives and presences within the Canadian literary landscape." It was founded by the Canadian poet and essayist Gillian Jerome.

Following VIDA's lead, in 2012, CWILA began publishing their own version of the Count, focusing on Canadian literary magazines.

Australia's Stella Count began in 2012, modeled after the VIDA Count. In 2015, they expanded their count to include a survey, also modeled after the VIDA Count survey, which included self-reported demographic information on gender, sexuality, race and ethnicity, and disability.
