= Dumanis =

Dumanis is a surname. Notable people with the surname include:

- Bonnie Dumanis (born 1951), American judge
- Michael Dumanis (born 1976), American poet, academic, and editor
