= Four Way Books =

American nonprofit literary press

- Founded: 1993
- Founder: Jane Brox, Helen Fremont, Dzvinia Orlowsky, and Martha Rhodes
- Country of origin: United States
- Headquarters location: New York City
- Distribution: University of Chicago Press
- Publication types: Books
- Fiction genres: poetry and short fiction
- Official website: fourwaybooks.com

Four Way Books is an American nonprofit literary press located in New York City, which publishes poetry and short fiction by emerging and established writers. It features the work of the winners of national poetry competitions, as well as collections accepted through general submission, panel selection, and solicitation by the editors. The press is run by director and founding editor Martha Rhodes, who is the author of five poetry collections. Four Way Books titles are distributed by University of Chicago Press. The press has received grants from New York State Council on the Arts, the National Endowment for the Arts, and The Community of Literary Magazines and Presses through their re-grant program.

== Authors ==
Representative authors published by Four Way Books include Catherine Bowman, Reginald Dwayne Betts, Kevin Prufer, Forrest Hamer, Yona Harvey, Monica Youn, Alex Dimitrov, Jeffrey Harrison, Sarah Gorham, D. Nurkse, Gregory Pardlo, C. Dale Young, Noelle Kocot, Joel Brouwer, Michael Dumanis, Cynthia Cruz, Pablo Medina, John Gallaher, Jay Baron Nicorvo, Maya Pindyck, Cynthia Huntington, Jason Schneiderman, Monica Ferrell, Sarah Manguso, and Eugenia Leigh.

Authors have been recipients of the Pulitzer Prize for Poetry, the Kingsley Tufts Poetry Award, the Rome Prize, The Edward Lewis Wallant Award, Guggenheim Fellowships, NEA fellowships, and many other honors; and Tommye Blount's Fantasia for the Man in Blue was a finalist for the 2020 National Book Award Four Way Books authors have been interviewed on the PBS NewsHour, regional and national radio, and print media, including The New York Times.

== Recognition ==
Four Way Books titles have been reviewed in The New Yorker, Publishers Weekly, Library Journal, Kirkus Reviews, Booklist, and many other publications. The press has been profiled in The New York Times Arts Beat, and in Poets & Writers. In a twenty-fifth anniversary feature of the press, the Los Angeles Review of Books praised Four Way Books for "publishing some of the most interesting, aesthetically diverse collections of poetry and fiction in the country."

The press sponsors the annual Levis Prize in Poetry for a full-length poetry collection; and through their Four Way Books + Friends Program, has sponsored since 1993, joint readings by its authors with those of other presses, and authors yet to be published. The press also sponsors "Pay a Book Forward, which offers free books to college students who attend readings," and "the electronic journal Four Way Review, which publishes poetry and fiction from emerging and established authors."

== Sources ==
- Four Way Books Website, Various Pages
