= Erin Hoover =

American poet and academic

- Born: Harrisburg, Pennsylvania
- Education: Sarah Lawrence College (BA); University of Oregon (MFA); Florida State University (PhD)
- Occupations: Poet; professor
- Writing career
- Notable works: Barnburner; No Spare People
- Notable awards: Florida Book Award (2018)
- Website: erinhooverpoet.com

Erin Hoover is an American poet, editor, and academic. She is the author of the poetry collections Barnburner (2018), which won Elixir Press's Antivenom Poetry Award and a Florida Book Award, and No Spare People (2023). She teaches creative writing and literary editing as an associate professor of English at Tennessee Technological University, and in 2026 became the first poet laureate of Cookeville, Tennessee.

== Early life and education ==
Hoover was born in Harrisburg, Pennsylvania, and grew up in central Pennsylvania. She earned a Master of Fine Arts from the University of Oregon and a doctorate in English from Florida State University, which she completed in May 2017. At Florida State she taught poetry, literature, and first-year writing as a graduate student and served as editor-in-chief of the university-affiliated literary journal Southeast Review. The manuscript that became Barnburner was her doctoral creative dissertation.

== Career ==
Before entering academia full-time, Hoover worked as an editor, journalist, fundraiser, and public relations director. She volunteered for the literary organization VIDA: Women in Literary Arts and co-founded the literary nonprofit Late Night Library.

Hoover later joined the faculty of Tennessee Technological University in Cookeville, Tennessee, where she is an associate professor of English. She teaches courses in creative writing and literary editing, advises the university's Certificate in Editing and Publishing, and coordinates the English department's writing prizes. Her stated research interests include poetry writing, gender and 20th- and 21st-century poetics, literary and professional editing, and equity in publishing. In 2025 she served as program chair for the Appalachian Studies Association Conference, hosted that year at Tennessee Tech.

Hoover produces "Not Abandon, But Abide," an interview series with women and genderqueer poets of the American South, published by Southern Review of Books. She curates and hosts Sawmill Poetry, an in-person reading series in Cookeville featuring writers from the region.

Alongside her academic work, Hoover has worked as a contract trainer for artificial-intelligence models through the recruiting company Mercor, which supplies subject-matter experts to AI developers.

=== Poet laureate of Cookeville ===
In late 2025 the Cookeville Arts Council named Hoover poet laureate for the city of Cookeville, a position the council established for the first time. She serves a two-year term running from January 1, 2026, through December 31, 2027. The council cited her contributions to the city's literary and cultural life. Hoover has said she intends to use the role to broaden youth participation in poetry and to work through local community partners.

== Poetry ==
=== Barnburner ===
Barnburner won the 2017 Antivenom Poetry Award from Elixir Press, judged that year by Kathryn Nuernberger, and was published in 2018. It received a Florida Book Award in poetry in 2018. The collection moves between the depopulated towns of central Pennsylvania and New York City, and takes up class, labor, and the American service economy.

Publishers Weekly described the book as a candid account of normalized cruelty and suggested it would prompt readers to examine their own passivity toward injustice. Booklist characterized it as an attempt to "kick down staid, prim, even academic poetic doors". Reviewing it for Poetry Northwest alongside Analicia Sotelo's Virgin, Julia Bouwsma read the collection's governing impulse as burning away a great deal in order to preserve the self.

=== No Spare People ===
Hoover's second collection, No Spare People, was published by Black Lawrence Press on October 20, 2023. The poems concern a mother-and-daughter household and take up single parenthood by choice, queer identity in the South, and economic precarity. Hoover has said she wrote most of the book over two weeks at a residency in 2020, after roughly three years without writing poetry.

The book was named to Lambda Literary's "Most Anticipated" list and was selected for Small Press Distribution's "SPD Recommends." Writing in Southern Review of Books, Chelsea Risley described the poems as sharp and open, and as reflecting the contradictions of living in the world as a woman and a mother. Emily Choate, reviewing for Chapter 16, wrote that the poems claim their own space and arrive at nuanced confrontations. A review in Heavy Feather Review called it a account of female resilience told in plain, direct language.

=== Consent ===
A third collection, Consent, is scheduled for publication by Black Lawrence Press in May 2027. Poems from the manuscript have appeared in ONE ART: a journal of poetry.

=== Shorter work ===
Hoover's poem "Girls," first published in Crab Orchard Review, was selected by Edward Hirsch for The Best American Poetry 2016. Her poem "On the Origin of Species" appeared in Best New Poets 2013. Her poems have also been published in Prairie Schooner, Alaska Quarterly Review, Harvard Review, Narrative, The Sun, Cincinnati Review, Poetry Northwest, Shenandoah, and Bennington Review.

== Awards and honors ==
- 2013 – Best New Poets selection
- 2016 – The Best American Poetry selection
- 2017 – Antivenom Poetry Award, Elixir Press, for Barnburner
- 2018 – Florida Book Award in poetry, for Barnburner
- Fellowships from the Kimmel Harding Nelson Center for the Arts and the Port Townsend Writers' Conference
- 2026–2027 – Inaugural poet laureate of Cookeville, Tennessee

== Bibliography ==
- Barnburner. Denver: Elixir Press, 2018. ISBN 978-1-932418-67-5
- No Spare People. Mount Vernon, NY: Black Lawrence Press, 2023. ISBN 978-1-62557-059-8
- Consent. Black Lawrence Press, forthcoming May 2027.

== Personal life ==
Hoover lives in Middle Tennessee with her daughter. She has described herself as queer in interviews and in the material surrounding No Spare People.
