= Hyphen (magazine) =

Asian-American magazine

- Hyphen's award-winning cover for Issue 7
- Editor-in-Chief: Karissa Chen
- Editor-in-Chief: Dorothy Santos
- Categories: Asian American
- Frequency: Quarterly
- Founder: Melissa Hung
- Founded: 2002
- First issue: June 2003; 22 years ago
- Final issue: Fall 2015
- Country: United States
- Based in: San Francisco, California
- Language: English
- Website: hyphenmagazine.com

Hyphen is an American print and online magazine, founded in 2002 by a group of San Francisco Bay Area journalists, activists, and artists including Melissa Hung, a former reporter for the Houston Press and East Bay Express; Claire Light, former executive director at Kearny Street Workshop; Yuki Tessitore, of Mother Jones; Mia Nakano, photojournalist; filmmaker Jennifer Huang; Stefanie Liang, a graphic designer from Red Herring magazine; journalist Bernice Yeung; and Christopher Fan, now a professor of English and Asian American Studies. Its advisory board included notable Asian American journalists such as Helen Zia and Nguyen Qui Duc, the host of Pacific Time. The first issue was released in June 2003. Hyphen was one of several Asian American media ventures created in the wake of A Magazine's demise.

Shortly after its release, the publication was sharply criticized by AsianWeek columnist Emil Guillermo who theorized that Hyphen's young editors were arrogant, ashamed of their Asian heritage, and disrespectful of existing ethnic media in his weekly column. He later said that he had not actually read the magazine.

The magazine's first issue contained a story package on the history of Asian American community activism. Its content is decidedly to the left, feminist, and non-mainstream. Its coverage includes politics, arts, and pop culture.

In 2004, the magazine was nominated for an Utne Independent Press Award for Best New Title. In January 2006, Hyphen's Body Issue won the Independent Press Association's Best Cover award for an image of an Asian American man, Yusuke Miyashita, partially submerged in a bathtub full of edamame. Mr. Hyphen, a pageant created by the magazine to showcase more positive images of Asian American men, debuted in May 2006. In the fall of 2007, the magazine received its second nomination for an Utne Independent Press Award, this time for Best Design.

Started in 2007, Hyphen partnered with the Asian American Writers' Workshop to start a short story contest called the Hyphen Asian American Short Story Contest, the only national, pan-Asian American writing competition of its kind. Previous winners include Preeta Samarasan, Sunil Yapa, Shivani Manghnani, and Timothy Tau. Previous judges include Porochista Khakpour, Yiyun Li, Alexander Chee, Jaed Coffin, Brian Leung, Monique Truong and Monica Ferrell.

On May 5, 2010, Hyphen and the Asian American Action Fund announced a cross-posting partnership. In 2014, Hyphen collaborated with Latino USA on content celebrating the intersections of Asian American and Latino American histories and cultures. In 2018, it partnered with the Asian Prisoner Support Committee to produce an anthology featuring the incarcerated and formerly incarcerated.

The magazine ceased publication of print issues in 2015 but continues to publish online..
