= Asian American Writers' Workshop =

Nonprofit literary arts organization

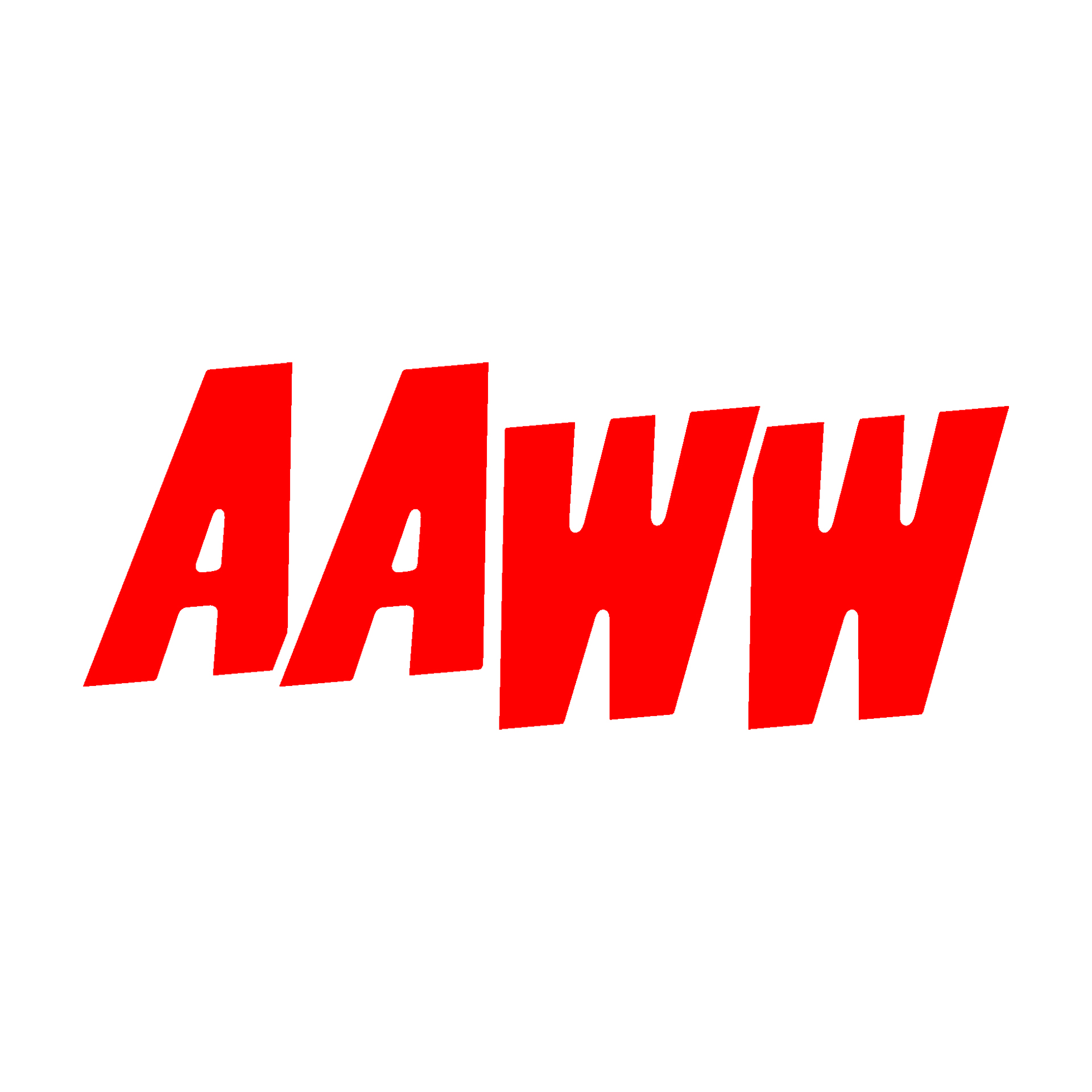
- Asian American Writers' Workshop logo
- Formation: 1991
- Type: not-for-profit
- Purpose: Asian American literature
- Headquarters: New York City
- Region served: United States
- Executive Director: Jafreen Uddin
- Website: http://www.aaww.org

The Asian American Writers' Workshop (often abbreviated AAWW) is a New York–based nonprofit literary arts organization founded in 1991 to support Asian American writers, literature and community. Cofounders Curtis Chin, Christina Chiu, Marie Myung-Ok Lee, and Bino A. Realuyo created AAWW because they were searching for New York City community of writers of color who could provide support for new writers.

The Asian American Writers Workshop runs two fellowship programs for emerging Asian American writers. The Open City fellowship is focused on journalism in a New York neighborhood, whether in the form of narrative nonfiction, creative nonfiction, or memoir. The Margins Fellowship is for writers based in New York City, aged thirty and under, who work in the genres of poetry, fiction, or creative nonfiction. Notable Margins fellows include Yale Younger Poet Yanyi. The Workshop also offers the Asian American Literary Awards and sponsors Page Turner: The Asian American Literary Festival.

In 2007, AAWW partnered with Hyphen Magazine to start a short story contest called the Hyphen Asian American Short Story Contest, the only national, pan-Asian American writing competition of its kind. Previous winners include Preeta Samarasan, Sunil Yapa, Shivani Manghnani, and Timothy Tau. Previous judges include Porochista Khakpour, Yiyun Li, Alexander Chee, Jaed Coffin, Brian Leung, Monique Truong and Monica Ferrell.

== Honorary advisors ==
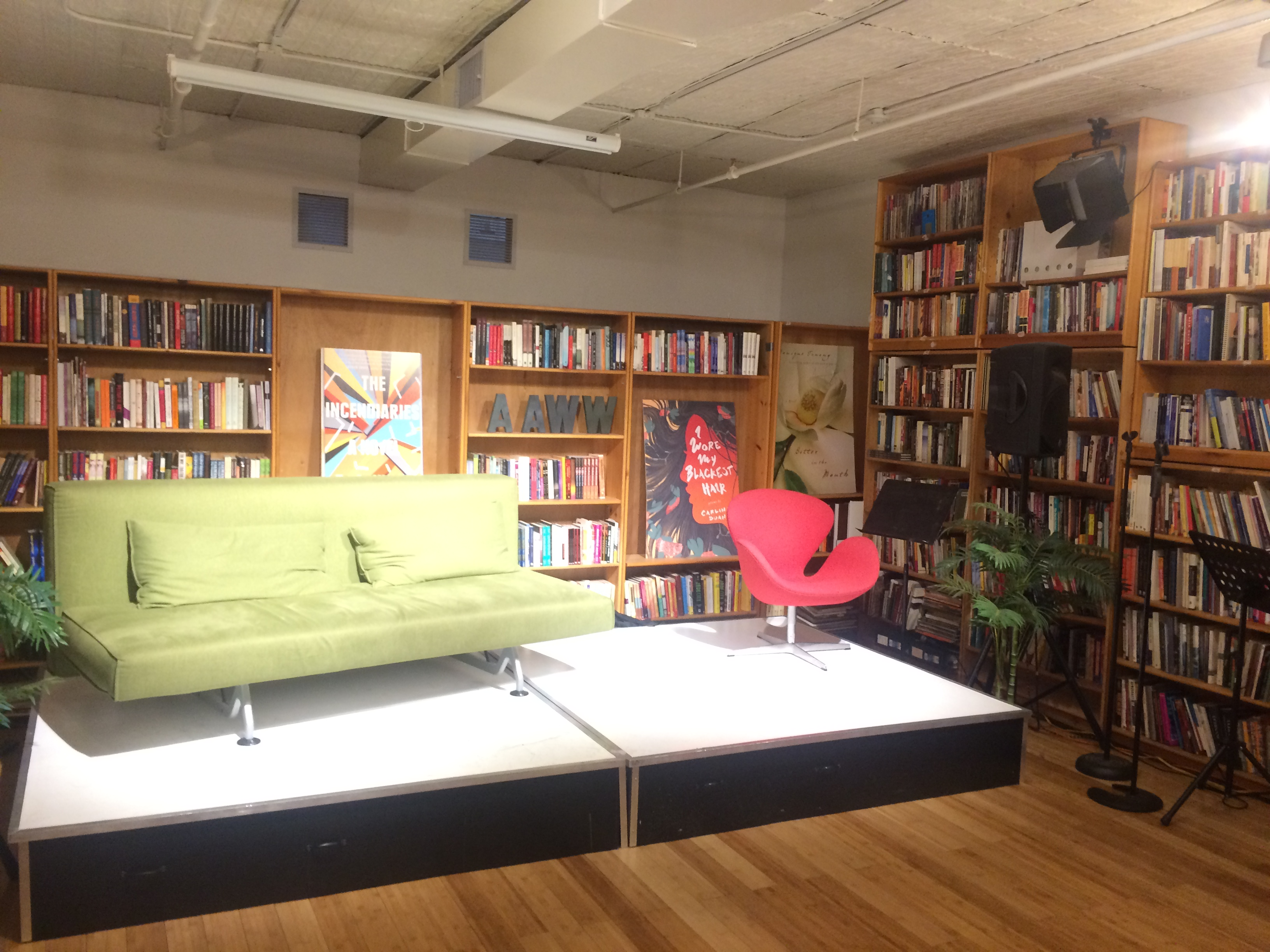
Asian American Writers' Workshop

- Harold Augenbraum
- Chitra Banerjee Divakaruni
- Jessica Hagedorn
- Kimiko Hahn
- Andrew Hsiao
- Stewart Ikeda
- Gish Jen
- Elaine Kim
- Jhumpa Lahiri
- Russell Leong
- David Mura
- Robert Polito
- Arthur Sze
- Shawn Wong

== Literary Magazine ==
AAWW's online literary magazine, The Margins, was launched in 2012. The magazine proclaims itself as being "dedicated to the Asian American creative culture of tomorrow," publishes a variety of literature by Asian American writers including short fiction, poetry, essays, interviews, and more. Through its published works and dedication to social justice, the magazine imagines a "vibrant, nuanced, multiracial, and transnational Asian America." Since the magazine's start in 2012, The Margins has received over one million views with an average of 3,000 people a week.

The magazine has three special projects: Open City, which reports in-depth stories from Asian immigrant communities in New York City; the Transpacific Literary Project (TLP), which showcases East and Southeast Asian writers and publishes literary work from the region; and A World Without Cages (AWWC), which publishes work by incarcerated writers and brings more Asian American voices into the anti-incarceration movement.

In 2019, The Margins was one of five recipients of the Whiting Literary Magazine Prize.

== Response to controversy ==
In response to the 2015 "yellowface poet" incident, the organization published a "white pen name" generator, which creates random white-sounding names "all the way back to Plymouth Rock." It was made in mockery of Michael Derrick Hudson, pushing back at the idea that writers of color might find greater success in the publishing industry if their names were whitewashed.

== AAWW Union ==
On November 5, 2025, AAWW staff and union members published an open letter in response to news that two senior editors at The Margins were being laid off, following two other departures and layoffs that year. The letter alleged that Jafreen Uddin had failed to secure new and existing grants for the organization and that she had instead eliminated positions and implemented hiring freezes. Signatories demanded the layoffs be cancelled, in addition to requesting a meeting be held with the AAWW board of directors and staff to discuss the future of the workshop. As of January 2026, the letter had been signed by more than 400 people.

== Board of Directors ==
- Manan Ahmed
- Alia Aljunied
- Jin Auh
- Jenie Fu
- Mariko O. Gordon
- Kirby Kim
- Jennifer 8. Lee
- Masum Momaya
