= Kiki Petrosino =

American poet (born 1979)

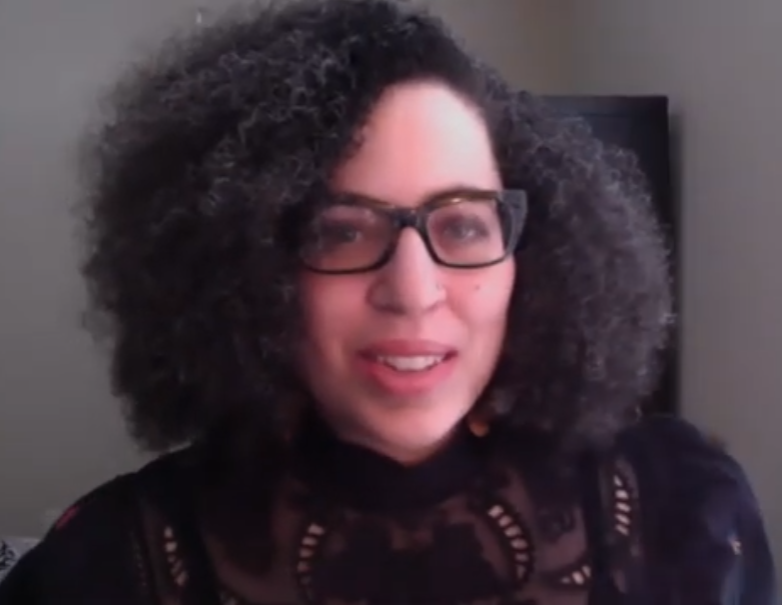
- At UC Berkeley's Lunch Poems in 2021
- Born: 1979 (age 46–47); Baltimore, Maryland, U.S.
- Education: University of Virginia; University of Chicago; Iowa Writers’ Workshop
- Occupations: Poet, educator
- Writing career
- Notable work: Witch Wife (2017)
- Notable awards: UNT Rilke Prize (2021) Pushcart Prize (2019)

Kiki Petrosino (born 1979) is an American poet and professor of poetry. She currently teaches at the University of Virginia in Charlottesville, Virginia.

== Early life and education ==
Petrosino was born and raised in Baltimore, Maryland. After spending two years in Switzerland teaching Italian and English in a private school, she earned a Bachelor of Arts degree from the University of Virginia (2001), a Master of Arts in humanities degree from the University of Chicago (2004), and a Master of Fine Arts from the University of Iowa Writers' Workshop (2006).

== Career ==
Petrosino previously taught at the University of Louisville in Louisville, Kentucky, and Spalding University, also in Louisville.

Her collection of poetry Witch Wife was cited by The New York Times as one of the best works of poetry of 2017. Her work has earned her fellowships such as the Al Smith Fellowship from the Kentucky Arts Council and the 2019 Fellowship in Creative Writing from the National Endowment for the Arts. Her prose has appeared in publications including Ploughshares, Poetry Magazine, Iowa Review, and more.

Reviewers have praised Petrosino's use of repetition and unconventional hyphenation in conjunction with traditional poetic forms such as the sestina. Petrosino has cited her familiarity with the Italian language and its comparative inflexibility as inspiration for her play with English.

== Honors and awards ==
- Rilke Prize, University of North Texas, 2021
- Creative Writing Fellowship, National Endowment for the Arts, 2019
- Al Smith Individual Artist Fellowship, Kentucky Arts Council, 2019
- Virginia Humanities Fellowship, Fall 2016
- Commonwealth Center for the Humanities and Society Faculty Fellowship, University of Louisville, 2016–17

== Works ==
Petrosino has published four collections through Sarabande Books, with Black Genealogy being published by Brian Mill Press.

- Fort Red Border (2009)
- Hymn for the Black Terrific (2013)
- Witch Wife (2017)
- Black Genealogy (illustrations by Lauren Haldeman) (2017)
- White Blood: A Lyric of Virginia (2020)

Petrosino's poems have appeared in Best American Poetry and Tin House.
