= Monica Ferrell =

American poet and fiction writer

- Born: Shana Monica Ferrell; November 8, 1975 (age 50); New Delhi, India
- Education: Harvard University; Columbia University School of the Arts (MFA)
- Occupations: Poet; writer
- Spouse: Michael Dumanis
- Writing career
- Genre: Fiction

Shana Monica Ferrell (born November 8, 1975) is an American poet and fiction writer. In 2007, she was awarded the Kathryn A. Morton Prize for her debut book of poems, Beasts for the Chase. Her novel, The Answer Is Always Yes, was published by Random House in 2008. Her third book, a poetry collection entitled You Darling Thing, was published by Four Way Books in 2018 and was named a New & Noteworthy selection by The New York Times. It became a finalist for the Believer Book Award in Poetry and for the Kingsley Tufts Poetry Award. Her fourth book, and third collection of poems, The Future, is being published by Four Way Books in 2026.

== Early life and education ==
Ferrell was born in New Delhi, India to a Punjabi mother and an American father. A graduate of the Dwight-Englewood School, she received a bachelor's degree from Harvard University and a Master of Fine Arts from Columbia University's School of the Arts and is married to poet and editor Michael Dumanis. Currently, she is the Doris and Carl Kempner Distinguished Professor at Purchase College (SUNY).

== Career ==
Ferrell won the "Discovery"/The Nation prize in 2001. From 2002 to 2004 she was a Stegner Fellow at Stanford University. Her writing has appeared in American Poetry Review, A Public Space, The Baffler, Black Clock, Fence, Gulf Coast, New England Review, The New Republic, The New Yorker, The New York Review of Books, The Paris Review, Ploughshares, Tin House, and The Yale Review, and in anthologies such as Language for a New Century: Contemporary Poetry from the Middle East, Asia, and Beyond (W.W. Norton), The HarperCollins Book of English Poetry (HarperCollins India), and The Penguin Book of Indian Poets (Penguin India).

== Bibliography ==
- 2008:Beasts for the Chase (poetry, Sarabande Books)
- 2008:The Answer Is Always Yes (novel, Random House)
- 2018:You Darling Thing (poetry, Four Way Books)
- 2026:The Future (poetry, Four Way Books)

== Honors and awards ==
- "Discovery/The Nation prize in 2001
- finalist for the Asian American Writers' Workshop Prize in Poetry
- fellowships from the MacDowell Colony and the Civitella Ranieri Foundation
- Wallace Stegner Fellowship from Stanford University
- finalist for the Kingsley Tufts Poetry Award
