= List of winners of the AWP Small Press Publisher Award =

The AWP Small Press Publisher Award is an annual prize given each year since 2013 to nonprofit presses and literary journals that recognize the labor, creativity, resourcefulness, and innovation of small publishers. The award is given to a publisher of books in odd years and to a journal in even years.

2020: Birmingham Poetry Review

- Ecotone
- Terrain.org

2019: Zephyr Press

- Green Writers Press
- Split Lip Press

2018: Creative Nonfiction

- Fence
- The Normal School
- Terrain.org

2017: Coffee House Press

- Belladonna
- CavanKerry Press

2016: Guernica

- Beloit Poetry Journal
- Creative Nonfiction

2015: Graywolf Press

- Bellevue Literary Press
- Coffee House Press
- Etruscan Press
- Salmon Poetry

2014: One Story, Inc.

- The Cincinnati Review
- Creative Nonfiction

2013: Sarabande Books

- Bellevue Literary Press
- Coffee House Press
- Red Hen Press
