= Sunil Yapa =

Sri Lankan American writer

- Education: Penn State University (BA); Hunter College (MFA)
- Website: http://www.sunilyapa.com

Sunil Yapa is a Sri Lankan American fiction writer and novelist. Yapa won the 2010 Hyphen Asian American Short Story Contest for his short story, "Pilgrims (What is Lost and You Cannot Regain)," which is also published in the Fall 2010 issue of Hyphen, Issue No. 21, the "New Legacy Issue." His debut novel, Your Heart is a Muscle the Size of a Fist (2016) was released on January 12, 2016 by Lee Boudreaux Books, an imprint of Little, Brown and Company.

== Background ==
The biracial son of a Sri Lankan father and a mother from Montana, Yapa grew up in central Pennsylvania and has traveled and lived in 48 US states and 35 countries, including Greece, Guatemala, Chile, Argentina, China, India, London, Montreal, and New York City.

Yapa graduated from Penn State University in 2002 with a Bachelor of Arts degree in Economic Geography, for which he won the 2002 E.W. Miller Award for excellence in writing in the discipline. He briefly attended the University of Houston's Creative Writing MFA Program and the London Film School, where he wrote a feature film screenplay in a course taught by Ellis Freeman. He received his Master of Fine Arts (MFA) in Creative Writing/Fiction degree in 2010 from Hunter College in New York City, where he studied with Peter Carey, Nathan Englander, Claire Messud and Colum McCann. At Hunter College, Yapa received the 2008-2010 Alumni Scholarship & Welfare Fund Fellowship, a grant given to only one MFA fiction student every three years, and was twice selected as a Hertog Fellow, working as a research fellow and research assistant to Ben Marcus and to Zadie Smith. Yapa has also received scholarships from the New York State Summer Writers Institute, the Bread Loaf Writers’ Conference, The Norman Mailer Writers Colony in Provincetown, Massachusetts, and the University of Houston Presidential Fellowship. In 2009 and 2010, he was a Fiction Intern for Esquire magazine.

In an interview with The Rumpus, Yapa states:

The first experience I ever had in a workshop was at VONA/Voices, the workshop for writers of color. I did it in San Francisco and it was an incredible experience. I studied with Chitra Divakaruni, and she encouraged me to apply to the University of Houston. [...] It was kind of a tough year. Houston was very much a literature program, and not reading for writers exactly, but reading from a critical perspective. I realized right away I didn’t want to do that. [...] I realized what kind of writer I was, and I don’t know, I love Faulkner, but I don’t wanna get into the themes of As I Lay Dying. I wanted to learn how to do multiple narrators. So I did a year there, I dropped out, I ended up at the London Film School for the summer. Then I went to New York State Summer Writers Institute and I met someone from Hunter. I’d never heard of Hunter. It was not really known at the time. Everything I said that I wanted in a program, she would tell me that’s what they had in Hunter. [...] I got in, and those guys, Peter Carey, Colum McCann, Claire Messud, Nathan Englander, all so talented, but with no ego. We all know talented writers don’t always apply to being good teachers, but they were incredible teachers.

== Writing ==
=== Short stories ===
Yapa's short story, "Pilgrims (What Is Lost and You Cannot Regain)" won the 2010 Asian American Short Story Contest (or Hyphen Asian American Short Story Contest) sponsored by Hyphen magazine and the Asian American Writers' Workshop, the only national Pan-Asian American Writing Competition of its kind. The story is about a Sri Lankan couple named Asoka (wife) and Sanjay (husband) adjusting to life in an unnamed rural United States town, which they newly arrived in, where Asoka later meets an American farmer that rescues her from a fall on Thanksgiving Day, which changes her perspective on life. The story is also published in the Fall 2010 issue of Hyphen magazine, the "New Legacy Issue." Whiting Award-winning author Alexander Chee and Jaed Coffin, author of the memoir A Chant to Soothe Wild Elephants, were the judges, and the piece was called "a poignant story of anguish and reconciliation" in the announcement press release. "[The story] forces not only the Asian minority to reconcile his or her orientation to Anglo-dominant America, but also shows how dominant America has to reconcile its relationship to the Asian minority," Coffin said, continuing: "[i]n its final gorgeous pages, 'Pilgrims' opened a space for the discussion of what it means to be ethnic and American."

Other short fiction pieces from Yapa have appeared in Pindeldyboz: Stories that Defy Classification such as "A Short Incident Involving a Boy, a Girl, Pigeons, and an Old Man with Advice" (Winter 2004).

=== Other writing ===
His book reviews have also appeared in the Winter 2007 and Spring 2008 issues of The Multicultural Review. His interviews have been published in The Tottenville Review, and he has also been interviewed for topical articles in American Short Fiction. He has also contributed pieces to The Margins from the Asian American Writers' Workshop.

=== Novels ===
Yapa's debut novel, Your Heart is a Muscle the Size of a Fist (2016) was published on January 12, 2016 by Lee Boudreaux Books, an imprint of Little, Brown and Company. Yapa also appeared on the Late Night with Seth Meyers show along with other guests Eva Longoria and Jason Mantzoukas on January 13, 2016 to promote the book. The novel is about a young man named Victor who gets involved in the turbulent backdrop of the 1999 Seattle WTO protests. The novel has also been named as "An Amazon Best Book of 2016," has been chosen as a Barnes & Noble Discover Great New Writers selection for the Winter of 2016, is one of Independent Bookseller's Debut Picks of the Season for Spring 2016, and an Indie Next Pick for January 2016. The novel has currently also received positive reviews from Publishers Weekly, Booklist, Library Journal (starred review), the Washington Post, the Chicago Tribune, Entertainment Weekly, Flavorwire, Bustle, The Rumpus, and Bookpage.

An excerpt from the novel also won second prize (and first prize in fiction) in The Miriam Weinberg Richter Memorial Award, a Hunter College writing competition judged by 2009 Impac Dublin winner Michael Thomas.

== Bibliography ==
=== Short stories ===
- "Pilgrims (What Is Lost and You Cannot Regain)" (Hyphen Magazine, Fall 2010)
- "A Short Incident Involving a Boy, a Girl, Pigeons, and an Old Man with Advice" (Pindeldyboz, Winter 2004)

=== Novels ===
- Your Heart Is A Muscle The Size of a Fist (2016) (Lee Boudreaux Books)
