= Preeta Samarasan =

Malaysian author writing in English

- Born: Batu Gajah, Malaysia
- Education: Armand Hammer United World College of the American West<vr>Hamilton College; Eastman School of Music; University of Michigan
- Occupation: Short story writer
- Children: 2
- Writing career
- Language: English
- Genre: Fiction
- Notable awards: Hopwood Novel Award; Hyphen Asian American Short Story Contest

Preeta Samarasan is a Malaysian author writing in English whose first novel, Evening Is the Whole Day, won the Hopwood Novel Award (while she was doing her MFA at the University of Michigan), was a finalist for the Commonwealth Writers Prize 2009, and was on the longlist for the Orange Prize for Fiction. A number of short stories have also appeared in different magazines; “Our House Stands in a City of Flowers” won the Hyphen Asian American Short Story Contest or the Asian American Writers' Workshop/Hyphen Short Story award in 2007.

== Life ==
Samarasan was born in Batu Gajah. Her father was a schoolteacher in Ipoh in Malaysia, where she attended the SM (Sekolah Menengah) Convent School. In 1992, she won a United World College scholarship and went to the Armand Hammer United World College of the American West in New Mexico, United States. After graduating in 1994, she went to Hamilton College, and then joined the Ph.D. program in musicology at the Eastman School of Music, University of Rochester. She was working on Gypsy music festivals in France, for which she was awarded a Council for European Studies fellowship in 2002. Meanwhile, in 1999 she had started work on her novel, and eventually she gave up on her dissertation to write. In 2006 she graduated from the MFA program in creative writing from the University of Michigan, where she worked on polishing her novel.

=== Evening Is the Whole Day ===
Evening Is the Whole Day focuses on the dark secrets of an affluent Malaysian Indian family (also living in Ipoh), and has been praised for its lyrical, inventive language, often using untranslated Tamil words, and using aspects of Bahasa syntax, such as reduplicatives as intensifiers. The "ambitious spiraling plot" has also come in for praise. Like servants in some other recent novels (Triton in Romesh Gunesekera's Reef and Ugwu in Chimamanda Ngozi Adichie's Half of a Yellow Sun), the servant girl Chellam emerges as an important character. The story also describes the May 13 race riots of 1969 using the cameo characters "Rumour" and "Fact". It was nominated for the Commonwealth Writers Prize in 2009 for the Best First Book Award.

Samarasan currently lives in the Limousin region of France with her husband and two daughters.

== Works ==
=== Novels ===
- Evening Is the Whole Day (2008)
- Tale of the Dreamer’s Son (2022)

=== Short stories ===
- "Our House Stands In A City Of Flowers", Hyphen (February 2007)
- "Trippin' Out", Hyphen (August 2007)
- "A Rightful Share", Guernica Mag (November 2009)
- "Blue", Readings From Readings 2, Sharon Bakar and Bernice Chauly (ed.) (2012)
- "Rukun Tetangga", KL Noir: Red, Amir Muhammad (ed.) (2013)
- "Common Ground", unpublished - translated into French in Nouvelles de Malaisie (2016), Brigitte Bresson (tr.)
- "Birch Memorial", A Public Space, Issue 6 (Winter 2007) - republished in The O. Henry Prize Stories 2010, Laura Furman (ed.)
- "Girl on the Mountain" and "Red and White", The Principal Girl: Feminist Tales from Asia (2019)
- "Useless", Mekong Review, Issue 15 (April 2019) - translated into French in Jentayu (Winter 2019), Brigitte Bresson (tr.)
- "Perhentian Sunrise", The European Review of Books, Issue 3 (April 2023)

=== Essays ===
- "Commemoration and other essays", Michigan Quarterly Review (2011-2014)
- "Mourning in Victory", Mekong Review (June 2018)
- "Quiet Cruelties", Mekong Review (April 2019)
- "The Limits of Compassion: Refugees in the Time of Corona", Queer Lapis, 21 April 2020
- "Preeta Samarasan on how Malaysia’s systemic racism forced her to move abroad and how she still mourns the loss of the nation which never quite accepted her", The Culture Review Mag, 23 April 2020
- "The race ladder", Mekong Review (May 2020)
