= Jeffrey Skinner =

American poet

Jeffrey Skinner is an American poet, writer, playwright, and emeritus professor in the Department of English at the University of Louisville.

His most recent collection of poetry is Sober Ghost (C&R Press, 2024). Skinner is a co-editor of two anthologies of poems, Last Call: Poems of Alcoholism, Addiction, and Deliverance; and Passing the Word: Poets and Their Mentors. Skinner's poems have appeared in many literary journals and magazines, including The New Yorker, The Atlantic, The Nation, The American Poetry Review, Poetry, The Georgia Review and The Paris Review.

Four of Skinner's plays have been finalists in the Eugene O'Neill Theater Conference competition, and his one-act, Damned Spot, won the 2006 Paw Paw Village Players short play competition. His other plays include Dream On, which had its premier full production in February 2007 by the Cardboard Box Collaborative Theatre in Philadelphia, and Down Range, which received a full production in New York City in 2009. He has also written Jonathon Agonisties, Fortunate Son, and The Golden Key.

His poems, plays and stories have garnered grants, fellowships, and awards from such sources as the National Endowment for the Arts, the Ingram Merrill Foundation, the Howard Foundation, and the state arts agencies of Connecticut, Delaware, and Kentucky. He has been awarded residencies at Yaddo, The Frost Place, the MacDowell Colony, and the Fine Arts Center in Provincetown. His work has been featured numerous times on National Public Radio. In 2002, Skinner served as Poet-in-Residence at the James Merrill House in Stonington, Connecticut. In 2014, Skinner was awarded a Guggenheim Fellowship in poetry. In 2015, he won an Arts and Letters Award in Literature by the American Academy of Arts and Letters.

Jeffrey Skinner is Chair of the Board of Directors, and Editorial Consultant, for Sarabande Books, a literary publishing house founded by his wife Sarah Gorham.

== Published works ==
- Late Stars (Wesleyan University Press, 1985)
- A Guide to Forgetting (Graywolf Press, 1987 - a National Poetry Series winner)
- The Company of Heaven (University of Pittsburgh Press, 1992)
- Gender Studies (Miami University Press, 2002)
- Salt Water Amnesia (Ausable Press, 2005)
- Six Point Five Practices of Moderately Successful Poets (Sarabande Books, 2012)
- Glaciology (Southern Illinois University Press, 2013)
- Divine Chance (Oberlin College Press, 2017)
- I Offer this Container: New & Selected Poems (Salmon Press, 2017)
- Sober Ghost (C&R Press, 2024)

== Sources ==
- Sarabande Books Website - About Us - The Sarabandistas!
- Author Website
