= Michael Dumanis =

American poet (born 1976)

Michael Dumanis (born January 18, 1976, in Moscow, Soviet Union) is an American poet, professor, and editor of poetry.

== Works ==
Dumanis’s first collection of poetry, My Soviet Union (University of Massachusetts Press, 2007), won the 2006 Juniper Prize for Poetry. His second collection of poems, Creature, published by Four Way Books in 2023, was a finalist for the National Jewish Book Award, the Vermont Book Award, and the Big Other Book Award. Other works have appeared in literary journals, including American Poetry Review, The Believer, Colorado Review, The Common, Denver Quarterly, The Hopkins Review, H.O.W. Journal, Indiana Review, Iowa Review, New England Review, Ninth Letter, Ploughshares, Poetry, Post Road, and Prairie Schooner.

Along with poet Cate Marvin, Dumanis coedited the anthology Legitimate Dangers: American Poets of the New Century (Sarabande Books, 2006). With poet Kevin Prufer. he edited Russell Atkins: On the Life and Work of an American Master (Pleiades Press Unsung Masters Series, 2013). He also served as the section editor for the poetries of Bulgaria, Czech Republic, Macedonia, Russia, and Slovakia in The New European Poets, an anthology from Graywolf Press (2008). Additionally, he acted as the editor for Cleveland State University Poetry Center's new publications from 2007, when he took over the small press’s directorship, until 2012.

== Biography ==
Born in the Soviet Union, Dumanis came to the United States with his parents when they were granted political asylum in 1981. From 2005 to 2007, he taught creative writing at Nebraska Wesleyan University in Lincoln, Nebraska. From 2007 to 2012, was a professor of English at Cleveland State University and served as director of the Cleveland State University Poetry Center, a literary small press. In 2012, he joined the literature faculty at Bennington College. In 2015, he relaunched the print literary journal Bennington Review, and serves as its editor. He is married to the poet and novelist Monica Ferrell and lives in North Bennington, Vermont.

== Education ==
Dumanis holds a BA from Johns Hopkins University, an MFA from the Iowa Writers' Workshop, and a PhD in English & Creative Writing from the University of Houston.

== Honors ==
In 1999, Dumanis received a fellowship from the Fulbright Commission, and has since received fellowships from Yaddo, the James Michener Foundation, the Wesleyan University Writers’ Conference, the Sewanee Writers' Conference, the Headlands Center for the Arts, and the Civitella Ranieri Foundation in Umbertide, Italy. He was also awarded a 2012 Creative Workforce Fellowship from the Community Partnership for Arts and Culture and a grant from the Ohio Arts Council.
