= Chana Bloch =

American writer and educator (1940–2017)

- Born: March 15, 1940; New York City, U.S.
- Died: May 19, 2017 (aged 77); Berkeley, California, U.S.
- Occupations: Poet; translator
- Title: Professor Emerita of English

Academic work
- Discipline: English literature
- Institutions: Mills College

Chana Bloch (March 15, 1940 – May 19, 2017) was an American poet, translator, and scholar. She was a professor emerita of English at Mills College in Oakland, California.

== Early life and education ==
Born as Florence Ina Faerstein in the Bronx, New York, she was a second-generation American, the daughter of Benjamin and Rose (née Rosenberg) Faerstein; her parents were both observant Jews who had immigrated from Ukraine. Bloch later identified herself as a Jewish humanist. Her father was a dentist, and her mother a homemaker.

Bloch earned her B.A. from Cornell University, her M.A. degrees in Judaic Studies and English literature from Brandeis University, and a Ph.D. in English from the University of California at Berkeley.

== College ==
She taught at Mills College for over thirty years (1973–2005) and directed their Creative Writing Program. Bloch held residencies at the Bellagio Center for Scholars and Artists, the MacDowell Colony, Yaddo and the Djerassi Resident Artists Program. She gave lectures and poetry readings at numerous U.S. colleges and universities.

Bloch published five collections of her poetry: The Secrets of the Tribe, The Past Keeps Changing, Mrs. Dumpty, Blood Honey. and Swimming in the Rain. A sixth book was published in the Fall 2017, The Moon Is Almost Full. Her work has been published in The New Yorker, Atlantic Monthly, The Nation and included in Best American Poetry, The Pushcart Prize and other anthologies. She was the poetry editor of Persimmon Tree, an online journal of the arts by women over sixty.

She was a co-translator, with Ariel Bloch, of the biblical Song of Songs. She translated works by modern Hebrew poets including The Selected Poetry of Yehuda Amichai with Stephen Mitchell, and Amichai's Open Closed Open, as well as Hovering at a Low Altitude: The Collected Poetry of Dahlia Ravikovitch with Chana Kronfeld. Bloch was also the author of the critical study, Spelling the Word: George Herbert and the Bible.

Chana's Story, a song cycle by David Del Tredici based on her work, premiered at the Yerba Buena Center for the Arts in San Francisco. Jorge Liderman's cantata, The Song of Songs, based on her and Bloch's translation, was performed by the San Francisco Contemporary Music Players and the UC Berkeley Chamber Chorus at Cal Performances.

== Personal life ==
She lived in Berkeley, California. She had two grown sons, Benjamin and Jonathan, from her marriage to Ariel Bloch, a former professor of Semitic Linguistics at UC Berkeley. She married Dave Sutter in 2003.

== Death ==
Chana Bloch died on May 19, 2017, after a prolonged battle with cancer.

== Awards and honors ==
Bloch won the Poetry Society of America's Di Castagnola Award for Blood Honey; the Felix Pollak Prize in Poetry for Mrs. Dumpty; and the PEN Award for Poetry in Translation, together with Chana Kronfeld, for Open Closed Open. Her translation of the Song of Songs was named as a Times Literary Supplement Book of the Year. Her awards include two fellowships from the National Endowment for the Arts, in poetry and in translation, a fellowship from the National Endowment for the Humanities, two Pushcart Prizes, and the Discovery Award of the 92nd Street Y Poetry Center.

== Bibliography ==
=== Poetry ===
Collections

- Bloch, Chana (1981). The secrets of the tribe. Sheep Meadow Press. ISBN 9780935296143.
- The Past Keeps Changing, Sheep Meadow Press (1992) ISBN 9781878818157
- Mrs. Dumpty, University of Wisconsin Press (1998) ISBN 9780299160043
- Blood Honey, Autumn House Press (2009) ISBN 9781932870336
- Swimming in the Rain: New and Selected Poems, Autumn House Press (2015) ISBN 9781938769009

List of poems

Title	Year	First published	Reprinted/collected
Dying for Dummies	2017	Bloch, Chana (July 3, 2017). "Dying for Dummies". The New Yorker. Vol. 93, no. 19. p. 55.	

Translations

- Hovering at a Low Altitude: The Collected Poetry of Dahlia Ravikovitch, with Chana Kronfeld. W.W. Norton (2009)
- Open Closed Open, Yehuda Amichai, with Chana Kronfeld. Harcourt Brace (2000)
- Yehuda Amichai: The Selected Poetry, with Stephen Mitchell. Harper & Row (1986). Revised and expanded edition, University of California Press (1996)
- The Song of Songs, with Ariel Bloch. Random House (1995). Reprinted, University of California Press (1998)
- The Window, Dahlia Ravikovitch, with Ariel Bloch. Sheep Meadow Press (1989)
- A Dress of Fire, Dahlia Ravikovitch. Sheep Meadow Press (1978)

=== Non-fiction ===
- Spelling the Word: George Herbert and the Bible, University of California Press (1985)
