= Alyce Miller =

American writer

Alyce Miller is an American writer who currently lives in the DC Metro area.

== Biography ==
She was born in Zürich, Switzerland and lived "most of her life" in the San Francisco Bay Area. She was a professor of English and taught in the graduate creative writing program at Indiana University in Bloomington for twenty years.

She received her B.A. from Ohio State University, an M.A. in English Literature from San Francisco State University; an M.A. in Film from San Francisco State University, 1987; an M.F.A. in Writing from Vermont College of Fine Arts in 1995; and a J.D. from the Indiana University School of Law in 2003. She is professor emerita from the English department at Indiana University Bloomington. She is also an attorney who works pro bono in family law and for animal rights. She believes that animals are not "just property," as the law defines them, but deserving of a different moral status that acknowledges their sentience, intelligence, emotionality, and capacity for happiness. In a recent interview, she stated that "writers have an obligation to know and pay attention to the world they live in."

== Career ==
Her first collection of stories, The Nature of Longing, 1995, won the Flannery O'Connor Award. Her second story collection Water (Sarabande Books), 2008, won the Mary McCarthy Prize for Short Fiction. She is also the author of the novel Stopping for Green Lights, 2000, and more recently, the nonfiction book, Skunk from Reaktion Books, 2015, and a third collection of stories, Sweet Love, from China Grove Press, 2015.

About Water critics wrote, "...Miller’s superb latest collection...pulls together nine deftly wrought stories that chart the ebb and flow of several remarkably diverse lives...These psychologically acute stories are truly satisfying—imaginative, open-ended, and haunting" (O, The Oprah Magazine). ". . . Miller’s prose is vivid and multifaceted yet possesses an admirable restraint that enhances the emotional honesty----and risk..." (Booklist). Her other short story collection, The Nature of Longing, won the Flannery O'Connor Award for Short Fiction. A novel, Stopping for Green Lights, expanded one of the stories in The Nature of Longing and explored in more depth the complications of interracial friendships and racial categories during a tumultuous time. She also writes and publishes nonfiction (personal essays and articles) and poetry. Other awards include the Kenyon Review Award for Excellence in Literary Fiction, and the Lawrence Prize from Michigan Quarterly Review.

== Bibliography ==
Short Story Collections

- Sweet Love (China Grove Press}, 2015
- Water (Sarabande Books, 2007)
- The Nature of Longing (W.W. Norton, 1995)

Nonfiction

- Skunk (Reaktion Books Animal Series, University of Chicago Press, 2015

Novels

- Stopping for Green Lights (Anchor Doubleday, 1999)
