= Mia Nakano =

America photographer, filmmaker, educator, printer, activist

Mia Nakano is an American photographer, filmmaker, educator, printer, activist, a founding editor of Hyphen magazine, and Project Director of the Visibility Project.

== Career ==
Mia co-founded Hyphen magazine in 2003 as the photo editor. As of 2014, she launched the LGBT section of Hyphen.

In 2007, Nakano travelled to Nepal for a photojournalism internship with the Kathmandu Post. There, Nakano connected with the Blue Diamond Society, an LGBT organization, and collaborated with them to take photos of Nepal's LGBT community.

== Visibility Project ==
Mia continued documenting LGBT communities once she returned to the United States through the Visibility Project. The Visibility Project is a collaboration with Hyphen Magazine.

The Visibility Project has been exhibited at Ohio State University, the Leeway Foundation in Philadelphia, the Oakland Asian Cultural Center, Smithsonian Asian Pacific American Center's Asian-Latino Festival in 2013.

Nakano was a panelist at Leeway Foundation's REVOLVE: An Art for Social Change Symposium.

Her work has been featured in Colorlines, Kathmandu Post, Motherjones.com, DemocracyNow!, and freethehikers.org.

In 2014, The Visibility Project collaborated with Hyphen Magazine to create LGBTQ Hyphen, the first LGBTQ-dedicated section in a nationwide and mainstream magazine.
