= Baltimore Review =

American literary magazine

- Discipline: Literary journal
- Language: English
- Edited by: Barbara Westwood Diehl

Publication details
- History: 1996–present
- Frequency: Annual

Standard abbreviations
- ISO 4: Baltim. Rev.

Indexing
- ISSN: 1092-5716

Links
- Journal homepage

Baltimore Review is an American literary magazine founded in 1996. It publishes short stories, poetry, creative nonfiction, interviews, and items of interest to those interested in creative writing. The Baltimore Review, a literary journal of poetry and fiction, was founded by Barbara Westwood Diehl as a publication of the Baltimore Writers Alliance. The journal grew to become a nationally distributed journal, and later became an independent nonprofit organization. Susan Muaddi Darraj then led the journal from 2003 to 2010, expanding contributions to include creative nonfiction and interviews. In 2011, Barbara Westwood Diehl resumed leadership of the journal and now serves as senior editor with Kathleen Hellen. The Baltimore Review became a Web-based journal in 2011, and the first Web issue was launched in February 2012. Web-published work would be collected in print issues. Work that first appeared in the Baltimore Review has been shortlisted for the Pushcart Prize and been noted in Best American Short Stories and other anthologies.

== Notable contributors ==
- Jacob Appel
- Deborah Mitchell Ashburn
- Ned Balbo
- Laura van den Berg
- Andrei Codrescu
- Michael Glaser
- Tom Glenn
- Sharon Goldner
- Melissa S. Hardin
- Reginald Harris
- Rosemary Harty
- Jamie Holland
- Adriana Husta
- Michael Kimball
- Dorianne Laux
- Jen Michalski
- Karen T. Miller
- Deirdra McAfee
- Meg Mullins
- Jay O'Callahan
- Michael Salcman
- Thomas Stringer
- Bill Valentine
- Eric D. Goodman
- Will Schwartz

== Masthead ==
- Barbara Westwood Diehl – Founding and Managing Editor
- Dean Bartoli Smith
- Elise Burke
- Joanne Cavanaugh Simpson
- Rick Connor
- Cody Ernst
- Benjamin Goldberg
- Ann Eichler Kolakowski
- Amanda Fiore
- Jonathan Green
- Julia Heney
- Jennifer Holden Ward
- Lisa Lance
- Holly Morse-Ellington
- Bobbi Nicotera
- Lalita Noronha
- Michael Salcman
- Seth Sawyers
- Ashley Scurto
- Holly Sneeringer
- Lynn Stansbury
- Matt Diehl – Webmaster

== See also ==
- List of literary magazines
