= Deborah Tall =

American poet

- Born: March 16, 1951; New York, United States
- Died: September 19, 2006 (aged 55); Ithaca, New York, United States
- Education: University of Michigan
- Occupations: Poet; professor; editor; author
- Writing career
- Notable works: A Family of Strangers; Summons; From Where We Stand; Island of the White Cow
- Literary movement: Lyric essay, Creative non-fiction, Sense of place

Deborah Anne Tall (March 16, 1951 – October 19, 2006) was an American writer and poet. From 1982 until 2006, she was a professor of literature and writing at Hobart and William Smith Colleges and edited the literary journal, The Seneca Review. She is the author of four books of poetry and three works of nonfiction and co-edited the anthology, The Poet's Notebook, with David Weiss and Stephen Kuusisto. Her most recent book of poems, "Summons," was chosen by Charles Simic to receive the Kathryn A. Morton Poetry Prize and was published by Sarabande Books. Her memoir, "A Family of Strangers," chronicles her search for her father's missing relatives and her struggle to uncover the past her parents have tried to forget.

== Life ==
Tall grew up in a middle class Jewish family in the Philadelphia suburbs. As a child she studied dance and piano. Her father was an engineer and her mother was a homemaker. She attended the University of Michigan at Ann Arbor, intending to major in philosophy, but switched her major to English instead. She graduated in three years. During her final year, she took up with a visiting professor, Tom MacIntyre, and the two subsequently moved to Ireland one summer in the 1970s. They spent five years on the island of Inishbofin, off the west coast of Ireland. They lived among a very small island population, and the experience is chronicled in her book, Island of the White Cow. After her return to the United States, she attended Goddard College, earning an MFA in Writing. She met husband and fellow poet, David Weiss, while living in New York City. While at Johns Hopkins University in Baltimore, they met fellow writers Stephen Scully and Rosanna Warren. She has two daughters, Zoe and Clea.

In 2004, Tall was diagnosed with inflammatory breast cancer from which she died in 2006.

== Published works ==
Poetry

- Eight Colours Wide (1974)
- Ninth Life (1982)
- Come Wind, Come Weather (1988)
- Summons (Sarabande Books, 2000)

Nonfiction

- Island of the White Cow (1986)
- From Where We Stand: Recovering a Sense of Place (1993)
- A Family of Strangers (Sarabande Books, 2006)

Edited

- The Poet's Notebook (1997)
