= Erin Belieu =

American poet (born 1965)

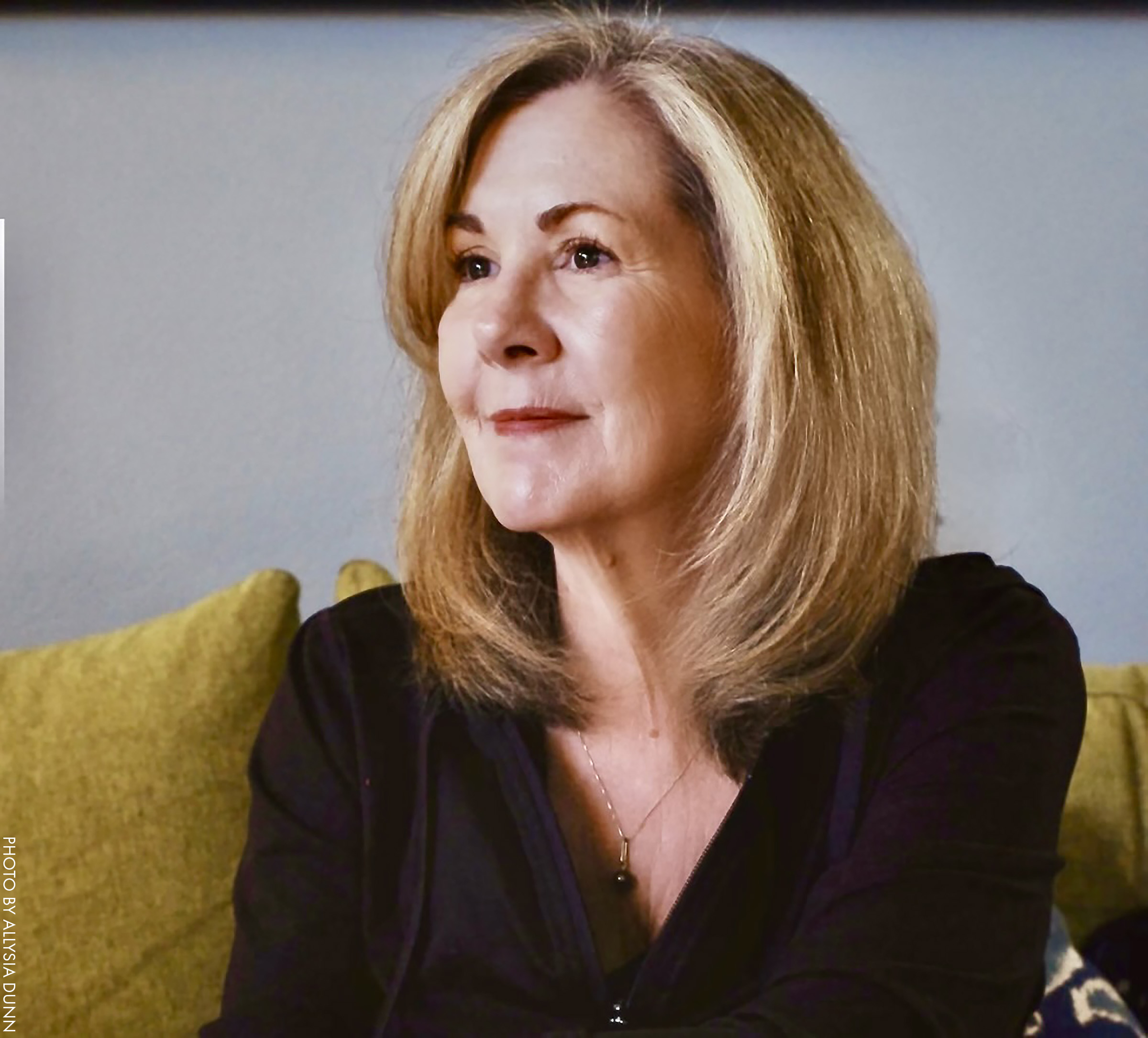
- Born: September 25, 1965 (age 61); Omaha, Nebraska
- Organization: cofounded VIDA: Women in Literary Arts

Academic background
- Education: University of Nebraska Omaha; Boston University; Ohio State University

Academic work
- Discipline: Poetry
- Institutions: University of Houston Washington University in St. Louis
- Writing career
- Language: English
- Notable awards: National Poetry Series 1994 Infanta; Rona Jaffe Foundation Writers' Award (Poetry) 1995

Erin Belieu (born September 25, 1965) is an American poet.

== Early life ==
Belieu was born and raised in Omaha, Nebraska, graduating from Central High School. She received her Bachelor of Fine Arts at the University of Nebraska-Omaha, where she learned how to construct poetry. Belieu then attended Boston University and Ohio State University, receiving advanced degrees in the area of poetry.

== Career ==
Belieu previously taught at Washington University in St. Louis, Boston University, Kenyon College, Ohio University, and Florida State University. She is presently on faculty at the University of Houston MFA/PhD Creative Writing Program where she holds a University of Houston CLASS professorship.

Belieu's work was chosen for multiple editions of The Best American Poetry anthology series and has appeared in places such as The New Yorker, POETRY, The Atlantic Monthly, Poem-a-Day from the Academy of American Poets,The Yale Review, TriQuarterly, Ploughshares, The New York Times, Tin House, Kenyon Review, Copper Nickel, and Virginia Quarterly Review.

Her poetry collections, all published by Copper Canyon Press, include Infanta, One Above & One Below, Black Box, Slant Six, Come-Hither Honeycomb, and her forthcoming collection Cocklebur: New and Selected Poems. She has coedited two anthologies: (with Susan Aizenberg) The Extraordinary Tide: New Poetry By American Women, the first large scale, non-thematic collection of poetry written by American women poets ever published, and (with Carl Phillips) Personal Best: Makers on Their Poems that Matter Most, an anthology that asks poets what they believe is their most significant poem, with each contributor writing a short essay on the personal significance of their chosen poem.

She has served as managing editor and poetry editor of AGNI and founded the magazine Hotel Amerika at Ohio University alongside her then husband, Jeremy Countryman.

In September 2006, Belieu was invited to join the Wave Press Poetry Bus Tour, along with notable poets such as Matthew Zapruder, Joshua Beckman, Eileen Myles, and Arthur Sze.

In August 2009, Belieu cofounded the national feminist organization VIDA: Women In Literary Arts, notable for its influential annual survey of the rates of publication between male and female authors. This VIDA survey, known as The Count, has been highly influential in addressing sweeping gender bias in contemporary American literary publishing. Belieu formerly served as VIDA's co-director, along with notable American poet Cate Marvin, before the original leadership team stepped away from the organization in 2016.

In 2016, Belieu founded Writers Resist, a national literary resistance network focused on promoting free speech and the ideals of democracy. The idea behind the resistance network came from Belieu's belief that "all politics are local." With poet Keith Kopka, and in partnership with PEN America, Belieu organized more than 90 events nationally and internationally, with writers gathering in their communities to stage readings supporting democratic ideals and protesting the incoming Trump administration. The readings were held on January 15, 2017, and received significant media coverage.

In recognition of her activism and literary citizenship, Belieu has received the Barnes and Noble Writers for Writers Award and the AWP George Garret Prize. In 2025, she received the Mari Sandoz Prize from the Nebraska Libraries Association, an honor that recognizes Nebraskans who have made significant contributions to the arts and culture.

Previously, Belieu won the National Poetry Series, in which her first collection Infanta was chosen for publication by poet Hayden Carruth. She is a recipient of The Rona Jaffe Foundation Award, the St. Botolph, Midlands Authors, and Ohioana Awards, a gold medalist for the Florida Book Award, and was a finalist for The Los Angeles Times Book Prize in 2005 for her collection Black Box.

== Awards and honors ==
- 1994 National Poetry Series, for Infanta, selected by Hayden Carruth
- 1995 Rona Jaffe Foundation Writers' Award
- St. Botoloph Award
- Ohioana Award
- Society of Midland Authors Award
- Gold Medalist, Florida Book Award
- Featured Reader at the Library of Congress, invited by former Poet Laureate Robert Pinsky
- 2005 finalist for The Los Angeles Times book award in poetry for Black Box
- Barnes and Noble Writers for Writers Award
- AWP George Garrett Prize

== Bibliography ==
=== Collections ===
- Infanta. Copper Canyon Press. 1995. ISBN 9781556591013.
- One Above and One Below. Copper Canyon Press. 2000. ISBN 978-1-55659-144-0.
- Black Box. Copper Canyon Press. 2006. ISBN 978-1-55659-251-5.
- Slant Six. Copper Canyon Press. 2014. ISBN 978-1-55659-471-7.
- Come-Hither Honeycomb. Copper Canyon Press. 2020. ISBN 9781556596100.
- Cocklebur: New and Selected Poems. Copper Canyon Press. 2026. ISBN 9781556597374.

=== List of poems ===
- "For Catherine: Juana, Infanta of Navarre", AGNI 56, 2002
- "The Last Of The Gentlemen Heartbreakers"; "In Ecstasy"; "Of The Poet’s Youth", Reading Between A&B, Fall 2007
- "Two Weeks On The Island", electronic poetry review
- "The Birthmark", Ploughshares, Spring 2003

Title	Year	First published	Reprinted/collected
Après moi	2013	Belieu, Erin (June 10–17, 2013). "Après moi". The New Yorker. Vol. 89, no. 17. p. 99.	

=== Anthologies ===
- The Best American Poetry, 2011 editors Kevin Young, David Lehman
- Rita Dove; David Lehman, eds. (2000). The Best American poetry, 2000. Scribner. ISBN 978-0-684-84281-3.
- Michael Collier, ed. (2000). "Radio Nebraska". The new American poets. UPNE. ISBN 978-0-87451-964-8.
- Glennis Byron; Andrew J. Sneddon, eds. (2008). "Tick". The body and the book: writings on poetry and sexuality. Rodopi. ISBN 978-90-420-2422-9.
- William J. Walsh, ed. (2006). Under the rock umbrella: contemporary American poets, 1951-1977. Mercer University Press. ISBN 978-0-88146-047-6.

=== As editor ===
- Susan Aizenberg; Erin Belieu; Jeremy Countryman, eds. (2001). The Extraordinary Tide: New Poetry by American Women. Columbia University Press. ISBN 978-0-231-11963-4.
- Erin Belieu; Carl Phillips, eds. (2023). Personal Best: Poets on Their Poems that Matter Most. Copper Canyon Press. ISBN 9781556596520.
