= Michael Derrick Hudson =

American poet and librarian

- Born: 1963 (age 62–63); Wabash, Indiana, United States
- Other name: Yi-Fen Chou
- Education: Indiana University Bloomington
- Occupations: Librarian; genealogist; poet
- Employer(s): Allen County Public Library, Fort Wayne, Indiana
- Known for: Using a Chinese female pseudonym in seeking publication

Michael Derrick Hudson (born 1963) is an American poet and librarian. Hudson is employed at the Genealogy Center of the Allen County Public Library in Fort Wayne where his job includes encoding articles for the Periodical Source Index (PERSI).

As a poet, Hudson has been published in several journals and literary reviews. His poems were nominated for the Pushcart Prize by the Greensboro Review and North American Review. Hudson gained attention by publishing a poem in the literary periodical Prairie Schooner which then was selected by poet and novelist Sherman Alexie for the 2015 edition of the Best American Poetry anthology series. Hudson, who is white, claimed to have submitted the poem and been rejected 40 times under his own name. He then used the pen name of Yi-Fen Chou, putatively a Chinese woman, and it was accepted for publication.

This led to widespread cricitism of the publishing establishment for inserting affirmative action, identity politics, and anti-White racism into the editorial selection process, and said Hudson's success after adopting an Asian-sounding pen name showed that literary journals apply different standards of literary quality based on race and gender.

== Early life and education ==
Michael Derrick Hudson was born in 1963 in Wabash, Indiana in the United States. He graduated from Wayne High School in 1982. After high school, Hudson attended Indiana University Bloomington. He currently lives in Fort Wayne, Indiana, where he is employed as a librarian at the Genealogy Center of the Allen County Public Library in Fort Wayne.

== Poetry ==
Hudson's poems have been published in several literary journals and magazines, including The Georgia Review, The Iowa Review, New Letters, Washington Square, Fugue, and Baltimore Review, amongst others. Several of which have garnered him minor poetry and manuscript prizes. Hudson's poems have been nominated for the Pushcart Prize ("Man vs. Nature" and "Ahnentafel") by the Greensboro Review and North American Review. In 2011, Hudson was recognized as an Honorable Mention for the North American Review's James Hearst Poetry Prize. In March 2015, two of his poems, "End of Days Advice from an Ex-zombie" and "Russians", were published in Poetry.

Hudson's manuscript, titled The Dead Bird in the Liquor Store Parking Lot, was selected as a finalist for both the University of Wisconsin's Brittingham and Felix Pollak Poetry Prize and the Utah State University's May Swenson Poetry Award. Five of his poems were named as co-winner of the 2014 Manchester Poetry Prize.

== Yi-Fen Chou and Best American Poetry ==
Hudson wrote a poem titled "The Bees, the Flowers, Jesus, Ancient Tigers, Poseidon, Adam and Eve" and claimed to have submitted it to 40 literary magazines under his own name. Hudson also claimed that after nine rejections, it was accepted for publication in Fall 2014 with four other poems by "Yi-Fen Chou" by Prairie Schooner, a literary journal affiliated with the University of Nebraska–Lincoln. In 2015, The New York Times reported that Hudson used the name of a Taiwanese immigrant who attended the same high school as him and had been working as a nuclear engineer in Chicago at the time of publication.

Hudson's poem, under the pseudonym, was considered for inclusion in the 2015 edition of the Best American Poetry anthology series to be guest-edited by Native American poet and novelist Sherman Alexie. Alexie selected the poem among the 75 poems published in the anthology. After learning of its selection, Hudson wrote to Alexie to reveal and explain his use of a pseudonym. Hudson's "contributors note" in Best American Poetry explains his tactics and motivation:

After a poem of mine has been rejected a multitude of times under my real name, I put Yi-Fen's name on it and send it out again. As a strategy for "placing" poems this has been quite successful for me. The poem in question ... was rejected under my real name forty (40) times before I sent it out as Yi-Fen Chou (I keep detailed submission records). As Yi-Fen the poem was rejected nine (9) times before Prairie Schooner took it. If indeed this is one of the best American poems of 2015, it took quite a bit of effort to get it into print, but I'm nothing if not persistent.

In a blog post Alexie discussed his criteria in selecting poems, stating that he would "carefully look for great poems by women and people of color" who had been "underrepresented in the past". After learning of Hudson's pseudonym, Alexie admitted that he "paid more initial attention to his poem because of my perception and misperception of the poet's identity." Instead of removing the poem from the anthology, which he stated would primarily be "because of my own sense of embarrassment", Alexie said he kept it rather than to expose himself to a lie that "would have cast doubt on every poem I have chosen for BAP. It would have implied that I chose poems based only on identity." He emphasized that "In the end, I chose each poem in the anthology because I love it. And to deny my love for any of them is to deny my love for all of them."

The publishing of Alexie's comment and Hudson's contributor note ignited a heated debate online, in the media, and amongst the literary world. In a roundtable discussion sponsored by the PEN American Center, Korean-American poet, author and editor Alexander Chee stated that Hudson has not been asked to offer proof (nor is proof available) to support his claim that the poem had been rejected 40 times under his own name. Chee said "the only reason I can think no one has made him prove it is that he is a white man, and when white men in America say they are discriminated against, people just say 'oh, ok', and do not ask them to prove it. Meanwhile, this case will be thrust at us as the sign that we are lying whenever we claim we're discriminated against". This statement was widely regarded as an example of anti-White racism. According to Megan Garber, writing in The Atlantic, Hudson intended to make a point about "identity politics in the machinations of the American literary establishment, perhaps about the plight of the white man as an outgrowth of those politics—he also did it, it seems, as a matter of expediency: A pseudonym seemed to be the only way he could get this particular poem published." Writing for Rumpus, Brian Spears characterized Hudson's use of a Chinese pen name to be "yellowface", and said "even in the creative world, for all our reputation as an open liberal stronghold, straight white male is the default against which all other writing is contrasted". Further, Spears opined that a white male adopting the name of a marginalized minority is an act that is both crass and offensive. Slate writer Katy Waldman described Hudson's submission as an unethical "attempt to game the poetry submission system" that "reap(ed) the benefits of affirmative action". Waldman characterizes the poem as "a poetry of grievance, and if flecks of self-mocking humor soften its despair, I'd argue that it's still slightly more interesting coming from a Chinese American writer than a white one". However, Waldman asks whether "Hudson's immoral gambit exposed a flaw in the literary ecosystem? Why should a poem be rejected under one name and accepted under another." Rod Dreher, writing in The American Conservative said that the poetry community "cannot have it both ways"—in seeking diversity as a chief criterion, it will sacrifice merit and fairness.

== See also ==
- Affirmative action
- Cultural diversity
- Diversity (politics)
- Political correctness
- Reverse discrimination
