= Patricia Jabbeh Wesley =

Liberian professor and poet

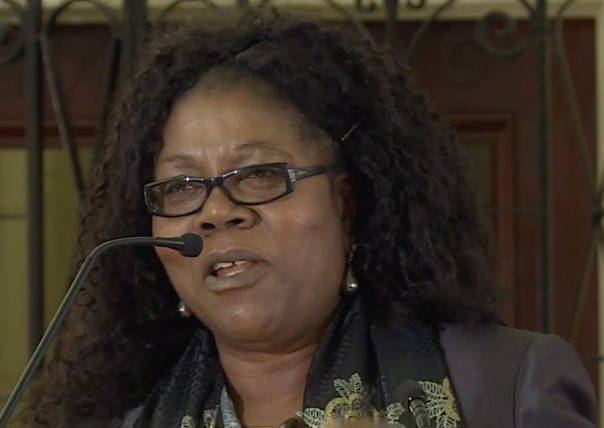
- Born: 1955 (age 70–71); Monrovia
- Education: University of Liberia (BA), Indiana University (MS), Western Michigan University (PhD)
- Occupations: poet, professor
- Writing career
- Genre: poetry
- Website: patriciajabbehwesley.com

Patricia Jabbeh Wesley is a Liberian (African Diaspora) poet and writer and Professor of English and Creative Writing at Penn State University. She is a Liberian Civil War survivor who immigrated to the United States with her family in 1991, and the author of six books of poetry and a children's book, as well as an anthology editor. Jabbeh Wesley also founded, chairs, and teaches in the educational/humanitarian organization Young Scholars of Liberia.

== Biography ==
Jabbeh Wesley was born in Monrovia, the capital city of Liberia. She then returned to her familial village of Tugbakeh in the Maryland region for boarding school, where she learned the Grebo language after first learning English. She attained her BA at the University of Liberia, her MS at Indiana University, and her PhD at Western Michigan University.

Jabbeh Wesley is the author of six books of poetry: Before the Palm Could Bloom: Poems of Africa (New Issues Press), Becoming Ebony (Southern Illinois University Press), The River is Rising (Autumn House Press), Where the Road Turns (Autumn House Press), When the Wanderers Come Home (University of Nebraska Press), and Praise Song for My Children: New and Selected Poems (Autumn House Press). She is also the author of a children's book, In Monrovia, The River Visits the Sea (One Moore Book).

She joined the nonprofit organization Writing For Peace because her career in writing "has been about giving voice to the voiceless in a world constantly at war." She also operates her own popular blog, Patricia Jabbeh Wesley's International Blog on Poetry for Peace, in which she tries to get readers to think "about the things that bother the world."

== Influences and themes ==
Although identifying herself as African, Liberian, and Grebo, she has also been shaped by Western influences. She acknowledges and accepts her hybridity of cultures as part of her identity while still calling herself a "a strong Africanist, believing in the values I was taught as an African Child." Her poetry's attitude shifts between critical, bemused, revelatory, celebratory, and mournful, as she discusses both her American and Liberian lives. Jabbeh Wesley constantly makes the reader aware of her exile. The vantage point of being an outsider to both the United States and postwar Liberian cultures permits a wide-awake honesty and fresh analysis of cultures, politics, gender relations, and attitudes.

Jabbeh Wesley has had numerous strong mothers, including her grandmother, mother, stepmother, and her mother-in-law. Even though the Grebo culture is mostly patriarchal, "it is in reality a matriarchal society, where the women figures have their place as the strong pillars of community and society. Mothers are important because they actually are in charge of the homes, the children, etc., and sometimes of business."

Jabbeh Wesley survived the Liberian Civil War, the event that influences and inspires most of her work. She is Christian, and her work incorporates and refers frequently to biblical themes and passages.

== Personal life ==
Jabbeh Wesley currently lives with her family in west-central Pennsylvania and has taught at Pennsylvania State University and Indiana University of Pennsylvania. She is married to an educationist, Dr. Mlen Too Wesley, former Vice President of Academic Affairs at the William V. S Tubman University in Maryland County. She is a mother.

== Awards ==
- 2022 Recipient/Winner 2023, Theodore Roethke Memorial Poetry Award
- 2002 Crab Orchard Series in Poetry Winner
- Victor E. Ward Foundation Crystal Award for Contributions to Liberian Literature
- Irving S. Gilmore Emerging Artist Grant from the Arts Council of Greater Kalamazoo
- World Bank Fellowship
- 2011 President Barack Obama Award
- Penn State University AESEDA Collaborative Grant for research on Liberian Women's Trauma stories
- 2011 Institute of Arts (IAH) Fellowship from Penn State
- 2016 WISE Women Literary Arts Award from Wise Women of Blair County, Pennsylvania
- 2020 Humanities Institute Fellowship from Penn State University

== Published works ==
Poetry Collections

- Before the Palm Could Bloom. New Issues Poetry & Prose. 1998. ISBN 9780932826640.
- Becoming Ebony. Southern Illinois University Press. 2003. ISBN 9780809325177.
- The River is Rising. Autumn House Press. 2007. ISBN 9781932870183.
- Where the Road Turns. Autumn House Press. 2010. ISBN 9781932870404.
- When the Wanderers Come Home. University of Nebraska Press. 2016. ISBN 9780803288577.
- Praise Song for My Children: New and Selected Poems. Autumn House Press. 2020. ISBN 9781938769504.
- Patricia Jabbeh Wesley: Collected Poems, 1998–2020. University of Nebraska Press. 2026. ISBN 9781496244246.

Children's

- In Monrovia, the River Visits the Sea (written by Patricia Jabbeh Wesley; illustrated by Kula Moore). One Moore Book. 2013. ISBN 9780615739007.

Anthologies

- Breaking the Silence: Anthology of Liberian Poetry (edited by Patricia Jabbeh Wesley). University of Nebraska Press. 2023 ISBN 9781496233066
- 2019 DoveTales Anthology: One World, One People (guest edited by Patricia Jabbeh Wesley). Writing for Peace. 2019 ISBN 9780989120678
