= Sarah Gorham =

American poet

Sarah Gorham (born March 30, 1954) is an American poet, essayist, and publisher residing in Prospect, Kentucky.

== Background ==
Gorham was educated at the Ecole D'Humanité, an international boarding school in Switzerland and received her MFA from the University of Iowa in 1978 as well as her BA in 1976 from Antioch College.

Gorham is author of four collections of poetry, most recently, Bad Daughter (Four Way Books, 2011). Gorham's poems have been widely published, including in Best American Poetry 2006 and The Nation. A memoir, "Alpine Apprentice" (University of Georgia Press, 2017) is a meditation on her time at an international boarding school in the Swiss Alps.

In 1994, Sarah Gorham co-founded Sarabande Books, Inc. with her husband, the poet and playwright Jeffrey Skinner. Sarabande Books, is an independent, nonprofit, literary press devoted to the publication of poetry, short fiction, and literary nonfiction located in Louisville, Kentucky. Gorham serves as president and Editor-in-Chief. In 2013, Sarabande Books, Inc. was awarded the inaugural Association of Writers and Writing Programs Small Press Publishers Award, for excellence as a nonprofit literary publisher.

The Journal magazine, noted that Gorham's poetry "investigates the difficult, often unsettling nature of family dynamics without self-pity and without pointing fingers" and Publishers Weekly wrote that her work "can also inhabit a dream space that only the bond between a parent and child makes visible".

== Awards ==
Gorham and Jeffrey Skinner were the 2002 writers-in-residence at the James Merrill House in Stonington, CT. Gorham has also received grants and fellowships from The Kentucky State Arts Council, The Kentucky Foundation for Women, The Delaware State Arts Council, The Connecticut Commission on the Arts, Yaddo, the MacDowell Colony, the Vermont Studio Center, and the Virginia Center for the Creative Arts.

Gorham was awarded a 2013 NEA fellowship in creative writing.

Her collection A Study in Perfect won the Association of Writers and Writing Programs Award for Creative Nonfiction in 2013, awarded by Bernard Cooper.

== Published essay collections ==
- "Alpine Apprentice" (University of Georgia Press, 2017)
- "Study in Perfect" (University of Georgia Press, 2014)

== Published poetry collections ==
- Bad Daughter (Four Way Books, 2011)
- The Cure (Four Way Books, 2003)
- The Tension Zone (Four Way Books, 1996)
- Don't Go Back to Sleep (Galileo Press, 1989)

=== Co-Editor ===
- Last Call: Poems of Alcoholism, Addiction, and Deliverance.

== Essay collection ==
- Study in Perfect (University of Georgia Press, 2014)

== Memoir ==
- Alpine Apprentice (University of Georgia Press, 2017)
