= C. Dale Young =

American poet and writer, physician, editor and educator (1969)

- Born: April 18, 1969 (age 57)
- Education: BS, Boston College, MFA, University of Florida, MD, University of Florida
- Occupations: Poet; Physician; Editor; Educator
- Writing career
- Genres: Poetry; Short Stories
- Website: www.cdaleyoung.com

C. Dale Young (born April 18, 1969) is an American poet and writer, physician, editor and educator of Asian and Latino descent.

== Life ==
Young writes and publishes poetry and short stories, practices medicine full-time, and teaches in the Warren Wilson College MFA Program for Writers. For 19 years, he edited poetry for New England Review, stepping down from the post of poetry editor there in August 2014. His poems have appeared in many magazines and journals, including The Atlantic Monthly, The New Republic, The Paris Review, POETRY, Yale Review, and elsewhere. His work has also been included in anthologies, including The Best American Poetry.

Young grew up in south Florida, and his early work is inspired by the tropical landscape of his home state. He holds degrees from Boston College (BS 1991) and the University of Florida (MFA 1993 and MD 1997). He completed his medical internship at the Riverside Regional Medical Center and his residency in radiation oncology at the University of California, San Francisco.

He lives in San Francisco, California.

== Poetry ==
=== Collections ===
- Building the Perfect Animal: New & Selected Poems, poems (Four Way Books, 2025)
- Prometeo, poems (Four Way Books, 2021)
- The Halo, poems (Four Way Books, 2016)
- Torn, poems (Four Way Books, 2011)
- The Second Person, poems (Four Way Books, 2007)
- The Day Underneath the Day, poems (Northwestern University Press, 2001)

=== Limited Edition ===
- Torn, letter-press broadside (Mad River Press, 2004)

== Fiction ==
=== Collections ===
- The Affliction, novel-in-stories (Four Way Books, 2018)

=== Short stories ===
- "The Intersection" (Blackbird, Spring 2021)
- "The News" (The Normal School, March 31, 2016)
- "Inside the Great House" (The Hopkins Review, Fall 2014)
- "Jewels" (Waxwing, Summer 2014)
- "The Fortunate" (Blackbird, May 5, 2014)
- "Desaparecido" (Waxwing, Spring 2014)
- "Between Men" (Four Way Review, Sep 30, 2012)
- "The Affliction" (Guernica, Feb 15, 2010)

== Essays ==
- "The Veil of Accessibility: Examining Poems by Frank O’Hara and Kenneth Koch in Light of Conrad’s Heart of Darkness" (American Poetry Review, March/April, 2013)

== Awards ==
- 2026: Thom Gunn Award for Gay Poetry, Finalist
- 2022: UNT Rilke Prize, Finalist
- 2019: John Gardner Fiction Book Award, Finalist
- 2019: Boston College Arts Council Alumni Award for Distinguished Achievement
- 2017: The 2016 Lambda Literary Award in Poetry, Finalist
- 2017: Hanes Award in Poetry, given by the Fellowship of Southern Writers
- 2015: UCSF 150th Anniversary Alumni Excellence Award
- 2014: Stanley W. Lindberg Award for Literary Editing
- 2012: Fellowship from the Rockefeller Foundation for residency at the Bellagio Study Center in 2013
- 2012: The MacDowell Colony, Residency Fellowship
- 2012: 2012 Guggenheim Fellowship
- 2009: Amanda Davis Returning Fellowship, Bread Loaf Writers' Conference
- 2008: 2009 Poetry Fellowship from the National Endowment for the Arts
- 2008: 2007 ForeWord Magazine Poetry Book of the Year Award, Finalist
- 2008: The 2007 Lambda Literary Award in Poetry, Finalist
- 2008: Northern California Book Award in Poetry, Finalist
- 2007: The Corporation of Yaddo, Residency Fellowship
- 2004: Academy of American Poets' James Laughlin Award, Finalist
- 2003: Stanley P. Young Fellowship, Bread Loaf Writers' Conference
- 2002: Norma Farber Poetry Award, Finalist
- 1992: Tennessee Williams Scholarship in Poetry, Sewanee Writers' Conference
- 1992: Grolier Poetry Prize

== See also ==
- Physician writer
- New England Review
