= Canadian Women in Literary Arts =

Canadian non-profit organization

Canadian Women in Literary Arts (CWILA) was a Canadian non-profit organization that was founded in Spring 2012 and active until early 2019. CWILA was the foremost compiler of gender-related statistics on Canadian book-review culture. Beyond simply revealing gender disparity in Canadian book-review culture, CWILA aimed to lead toward positive change from within the Canadian literary community.

CWILA's mission statement was:

to promote and foster equity and equality of representation in the Canadian literary community by tracking statistics on gender representation in reviewing... bringing relevant issues of gender, race and sexuality into our national literary conversation... and creating a network supportive of the active careers of female writers, critics and their literary communities.

== Foundation ==
CWILA was founded by poet and UBC lecturer Gillian Jerome. Jerome explains that the idea for CWILA originated in her when she read Natalie Walschots' blog in which Walschot counted the number of reviews Michael Lista had written in National Post's poetry column in the last year, and found that out of fourteen books reviewed, only two were authored by women.

Motivated by this incident, Jerome set out to expose the disadvantages experienced by female writers, which are fostered by contemporary review culture in Canada. A month after its inception, CWILA had a membership of more than 50 volunteers who would go on to prove that there was, indeed, a significant gender bias in Canadian literary culture.

By 2012, CWILA counted 400 members from various disciplines within the literary community, and had established the position of Critic-in-Residence.

== Statistics ==
=== 2011 ===
The first CWILA count was initiated in 2011, counting a total of 14 Canadian publications reviewing Canadian books. The summary concluded that 62% of the reviews were written by men and that 59% of the books were written by men. The following year, the CWILA Count raised the number of publications to be reviewed from 14 to 25.

=== 2012 ===
The CanLit Guides notes that the CWILA's 2012 inaugural Count revealed a significant gender disparity in books reviewed by men. Of the books reviewed by men, 70% were authored by men and only 30% were authored by women; in contrast, 57% of books reviewed by women were written by women, and 47% were written by men. While the count showed an increase in the proportion of reviews written about books authored by women, it was observed that a gender gap still existed in the Canadian literary community.

In order to enhance and advance from their previous binary data, CWILA broadened their categories to include transgender writers, genderqueer writers, and mixed-gender co-authors. CWILA also began to track the level of Canadian content being reviewed.

The 25 publications in the 2012 CWILA Count consist of 3,092 reviews, where two-thirds of the publications pertained to books by Canadian authors and two-thirds reviewed books by Canadian authors at least three-quarters of the time. In addition, in 22 of the 25 publications, the majority of reviews are of works by Canadian authors.

=== 2013 ===
In 2013, the CWILA Count totaled to 5,613 book reviews in 31 publications. Additionally, CWILA broadened their horizons of reviews by including French-language publications into the mix. For the 2013 CWILA Count, CWILA included 4 French-language publications. This was an 82% increase in reviews from the previous year. The additions to the annual report included that overall, 57% of the reviews were written by men, 37% were written by women, 5% were by male and female co-authors, 1% by unknown writers, and under 1% by non-binary writers. Of the reviews written by women, 43% were books written by men and 51% were books written by women. Of the reviews written by men, 69% were books written by men and 28% were books written by women. The CWILA Count showed that men were 3 times as likely to review books by men as opposed to books by women.

=== 2014 ===
CWILA's 2014 Count included 5,866 reviews, of which 32 were publications by journals and newspapers, and of those 32 publications, 5 were French-language publications. The results of the reviews by category were: 53% written by men, 39% written by women, 7% written by mixed-gender co-authors, under 1% written by unknown authors, and under .1% written by non-binary authors.

Within the 2014 CWILA Count, the results showed that men were 2.5 times more likely to review books written by men than books written by women, which is .5 times less than the previous year. The CWILA Count also showed that women were 12% more likely to review books authored by women compared to books authored by men. Furthermore, the CWILA Count for 2014 noticed a disparity among the genres being reviewed in books, particularly in non-fictional works. Of the non-fictional works, the results showed that 29% of the books were written by women, 61% by men, 8% by mixed gender authors, 2% by various/unknown authors, and under .1% by non-binary authors. This emphasized that genre and gender could and did impact the gender disparity amongst authors for literary works, still enabling a disadvantage to those who weren't male writers.

=== 2015 ===
For the first time since the project initiated, the overall CWILA Count had reached its closest to an equal balance of male to female reviewers with the final ratio being 49% of reviews being written by men and 48% by women. The remaining included 3% anonymous reviewers, under 1% mixed-gender co-reviewers, and under .1% non-binary reviewers.

However, there is still a large unequal gender disparity of reviewers in French publications. The 2015 CWILA Count results in reviews in English publications were: 55% women, 42% men, 2% anonymous, under 1% mixed-gender co-authors, and under .1% non-binary reviewers. The results for the reviews in French were: 67% men, 29% women, and 2% anonymous.

Of all of the books reviewed, there still remained a gender imbalance throughout the authors of the books being reviewed. The CWILA Count included: 52% by men, 40% by women, 7.5% by mixed-gender co-authors, under 1% written by anonymous authors, and 0.1% by authors identified as non-binary. The male to female results had shifted from the previous year, as in 2014, only 39% were women authors and 57% were male authors.

Of the total books that were counted, 60% were Canadian, 39% were non-Canadian, and under 1% were various/unknown. An analysis within CWILA's statistics of non-fictional genre also shows an imbalance, resulting in the works by gender to be: 59% by men, 30% by women, 9% by mixed-gender authors, 1% by various/unknown authors, and 0.1% by non-binary authors.

== Critic-in-Residence Program ==
In 2013, as a part of their mandate to encourage a female perspective in the Canadian book review community, CWILA instituted the position of critic-in-residence. Each year, CWILA chooses a female, transgender, or genderqueer writer as their critic-in-residence; they are responsible for commenting on the statistics gathered in the CWILA annual count, and submitting critical essay and book reviews, which will be archived at year-end by CWILA.

=== Critics ===
- Sue Sinclair (2013): CWILA's first critic-in-residence.
- Shannon Webb-Campbell (2014): Stated that her role as critic-in-residence would be "to help close the gender gap, evaluate and improve Canadian literary discourse".
- Lucas Crawford (2015): Was inspired by CWILA's goals to address gender-bias in the Canadian literary establishment, and by CWILA's active interest in transgender/genderqueer involvement and representation in the organization.
- Adèle Barclay (2017): CWILA's most recent choice for critic-in-residence. Her interests centre on the representation of "intersectional voices", and broadening CWILA's examination of non-fiction as well as fiction.
