= Sarabande Books =

American not-for-profit literary press

- Founded: 1994
- Founder: Sarah Gorham and Jeffrey Skinner
- Country of origin: United States
- Headquarters location: Louisville, Kentucky
- Distribution: Consortium Book Sales & Distribution
- Publication types: Books
- Official website: www.sarabandebooks.org

Sarabande Books is an American not-for-profit literary press founded in 1994. It is headquartered in Louisville, Kentucky, with an office in New York City. Sarabande publishes contemporary poetry and nonfiction. Sarabande is a literary press whose books have earned reviews in The New York Times.

The press was co-founded by Sarah Gorham (President and Editor-in-Chief) and Jeffrey Skinner (Chair). According to a CLMP Newswire interview, "Its mission, according to Gorham, is to publish poetry and fiction and to disburse the works of its authors 'with diligence and creativity.' The press also serves as an educational resource to teachers and creative writing students." The press publishes the winners of its national poetry and fiction competitions, as well as manuscripts accepted through general submission.

Sarabande Books titles are distributed by Consortium Book Sales & Distribution. The press has received grants from the Kentucky Arts Council, the National Endowment for the Arts, and private foundations.

Notable authors published by Sarabande Books include Ralph Angel, Rick Barot, Frank Bidart, Sallie Bingham, Alice Fulton, Louise Glück, Mark Jarman, Karen An-hwei Lee, Cate Marvin, Cleopatra Mathis, Alyce Miller, Kyle Minor, Edith Pearlman, Kiki Petrosino, Lia Purpura, Joan Silber, Gerald Stern, Deborah Tall, Paul Yoon, and Ann Townsend.

Authors have been recipients of many awards including the Whiting Foundation Award, the PEN USA Award in Poetry, the Norma Farber First Book Award, the Pushcart Prize, grants from the National Endowment for the Arts, Guggenheim Fellowships, and numerous other honors.

Sarabande Books titles have been reviewed in The New York Times Book Review, Publishers Weekly, Library Journal, Kirkus Reviews, The Nation, American Book Review, and many other publications.

Awards given by Sarabande Books include the Kathryn A. Morton Prize in Poetry and the Mary McCarthy Prize in Short Fiction.

== Awards ==
In 2013, Sarabande Books was the inaugural winner of the AWP Small Press Publisher Award given by the Association of Writers & Writing Programs that "acknowledges the hard work, creativity, and innovation" of small presses and "their contributions to the literary landscape" of the US.
