= Martha Rhodes =

American poet, teacher, and publisher

Martha Rhodes (born Boston, Massachusetts) is an American poet, teacher, and publisher.

== Biography ==
Martha Rhodes was born in Boston, Massachusetts. She received her B.A. from The New School for Social Research and her M.F.A. from the Warren Wilson College MFA Program for Writers. She has taught at The New School University, Emerson College, and at the University of California, Irvine's MFA Program. She teaches at the Warren Wilson College MFA Program for Writers A founding editor of Four Way Books, she serves as Publisher and Executive Editor for the award-winning literary press. She has been interviewed in The New York Times, Los Angeles Review of Books, American Book Review, and The Best American Poetry Blog.

She is author of five poetry collections, most recently The Thin Wall (University of Pittsburgh Press, 2017), The Beds (Autumn House Press, 2012), Mother Quiet (Zoo Press, 2004. Her second collection, Perfect Disappearance, won the 2000 Green Rose Prize from New Issues Press). At the Gate was released in 1995 from Provincetown Arts Press. Her books have been reviewed in The Washington Post, Publishers Weekly, Rain Taxi, Kenyon Review, and other venues.

She has published poems in many literary journals including AGNI, Fence, Harvard Review, New England Review, Ploughshares, The American Poetry Review, Barrow Street, and TriQuarterly, and in anthologies including The Extraordinary Tide: New Poetry by American Women (Columbia University Press, 2001), and The KGB Bar Book of Poems (HarperCollins, 2000), and The New American Poets: A Bread Loaf Anthology (Bread Loaf Writer's Conference/Middlebury College, 2000).

== Published works ==
- The Thin Wall (University of Pittsburgh Press, 2017)
- The Beds (Autumn House Press 2012)
- Mother Quiet (Zoo Press, 2004)
- Perfect Disappearance (New Issues Press, 2000)
- At the Gate (Provincetown Arts, 1995)

== Sources ==
- Pine Manor College > 2009 Solstice Conference Faculty
- Sarah Lawrence College > Undergraduate Faculty
