= Michael Salcman =

American poet and physician (born 1946)

Michael Salcman (born 1946) is an American poet and physician who lives in Baltimore, Maryland. His poetical work is infused and vivified by his medical profession, his love of and expertise in contemporary art, and by the fact that his parents were Holocaust survivors. His work is characterized by a lushness of diction, a strong moral focus, and a sense of playful imagery.

== Biography ==
The son of Holocaust survivors, he was born in Pilsen, Czechoslovakia, and came to the United States in 1949. A graduate of the Combined Program in Liberal Arts and Medical Education at Boston University (B.A. and M.D, both 1969), he trained in neurophysiology at the National Institutes of Health and in neurological surgery at Columbia University. He was chairman of neurosurgery at the University of Maryland from 1984 through 1991. He is the author of many medical and scientific papers. His art reviews and essays on the arts and sciences and the visual arts and the brain have appeared in Urbanite Magazine, "Little Patuxent Review, Neurosurgery, "World Neurosurgery," "J.A.M.A.," Creative Non-Fiction and on-line sites such as www.PEEKreview.net and www.artbrain.org. He has also taught courses on the History of Contemporary Art at Roland Park Country School, the Contemporary Museum, and at Johns Hopkins and Towson Universities, and given seminars on the brain's visual system and art at the Cooper Union in New York and at the Maryland Institute College of Art (MICA) in Baltimore. His course on How The Brain Works appeared on The Knowledge Network of the New York Times.

Salcman's earliest published poems date from 1963. His poems have been widely published in such journals as the Alaska Quarterly Review, Arts & Letters, Harvard Review, Hopkins Review, Hudson Review, Notre Dame Review, New Letters, Ontario Review, and Raritan. His poems have been heard on NPR's All Things Considered and in Euphoria an award-winning documentary on the brain and creativity. They have been nominated six times for a Pushcart Prize, twice for a Best of The Web Award, and have appeared on Verse Daily and Poetry Daily. Salcman is the author of four chapbooks, most recently, Stones in Our Pockets (Parallel Press, University of Wisconsin-Madison, 2007). His poems have appeared in an award-winning film by Lee Boot on the brain and creativity, Euphoria. More recently, Baltimore composer Lorraine Whittlesey has set Salcman's poems to music (2012) and "Katya's Great Romance" was set to music by New York composer Richard Wilson in 2018. His widely praised anthology of classic and contemporary poems on doctors, patients, illness and healing, "Poetry in Medicine" (Persea Books, New York, 2015) is now used in medical school courses on Narrative Medicine. Salcman is the author of ten collections of poems, including "The Clock Made of Confetti"(Orchises Press, Washington, D.C., 2007), nominated for The Poets Prize and a Finalist for the Towson University Prize in Literature, "The Enemy of Good Is Better" (Orchises, 2011), and "A Prague Spring, Before & After," winner of the 2015 Sinclair Poetry Prize from Evening Street Press. "Shades & Graces: New Poems” won the inaugural Daniel Hoffman Poetry Prize (Spuyten-Duyvil, Brooklyn, 2020); Hoffman is a former Poet Laureate of the United States (1973). It received a glowing review in the 2021 Spring issue of The Hudson Review. In 2022, "Necessary Speech: New & Selected Poems" was published by Spuyten Duyvil in New York. Also published by Spuyten Duyvil is "Crossing the Tape," his most rececent collection of poems (2024),

His poetry, though lyrical, is dense with information about cultural history, art, metaphysics, and brain theory. His major themes and subject matter is family history and the Holocaust, experiences with patients, and his love of sailing and for the Chesapeake Bay. His work is characterized by careful attention to metaphor, rhythm and internal music. David Bergman’s introductory essay to “Shades & Graces” discusses the late-life production and appreciation of Salcman’s oeuvre (3) and Meg Schoerke’s recent article in The Hudson Review (4), Poetry for a Pandemic Spring, discusses some parallels of Salcman’s poetry to early Modernists like Eliot and W.C. Williams.

== Books, Medical & Scientific ==
- Neurologic Emergencies, 1st edition, New York, Raven Press, 1980.
- Neurologic Emergencies, 2nd edition, New York, Raven Press, 1990.
- Neurobiology of Brain Tumors, Baltimore, Williams & Wilkins, 1991.
- Current Techniques in Neurosurgery, 1st edition, Philadelphia, Current Medicine, 1993.
- Current Techniques in Neurosurgery, 2nd edition, Philadelphia, Current Medicine/Churchill Livingstone, 1996.
- Current Techniques in Neurosurgery, 3rd edition, Philadelphia, Current Medicine/Springer-Verlag, 1998.
- Kempe's Operative Neurosurgery, two volumes, Springer-Verlag, New York, 2004.

== Books, Poetry ==
- Plow Into Winter, Pudding House Press, Ohio, 2003 (chapbook).
- The Color That Advances, Camber Press, New York, 2003 (chapbook).
- A Season Like This, Finishing Line Press, Kentucky, 2004 (chapbook).
- The Clock Made of Confetti, Orchises Press, Washington D.C., 2007; nominated for The Poets' Prize.
- Stones In Our Pockets, Parallel Press, University of Wisconsin-Madison, 2007 (chapbook).
- The Enemy of Good Is Better, Orchises Press, Washington D.C., 2011.
- Poetry in Medicine, An Anthology of Poems About Doctors, Patients, Illness and Healing, Persea Books, New York, 2015 (anthology).
- A Prague Spring, Before & After, Evening Street Press, Sacramento, 2016; winner of the 2015 Sinclair Poetry Prize.
- Shades & Graces: New Poems, Spuyten Duyvil, New York, 2020; inaugural winner of the Daniel Hoffman Legacy Book Prize.
- Necessary Speech: New & Selected Poems, Spuyten Duyvil, New York, 2022.
- Crossing the Tape: Poems, Spuyten Duyvil, New York, 2024.
