= Gillian Jerome =

Canadian poet, essayist, editor and instructor

- Born: Ottawa, Ontario, Canada
- Education: Masters of Fine Arts in Writing, University of Arizona
- Writing career
- Genres: Poet, essayist and author
- Website: Official website

Gillian Jerome is a Canadian poet, essayist, editor, university instructor and high-school educator. She won the City of Vancouver Book Award in 2009 and the ReLit Award for Poetry in 2010. Jerome is a co-founder of Canadian Women In Literary Arts (CWILA), and also serves as the poetry editor for Geist. She is a lecturer in literature at the University of British Columbia and also runs writing workshops at the Post 750 in downtown Vancouver.

Her work has been published by Geist, Canadian Literature, The Malahat Review, The Fiddlehead, Grain and the Colorado Review.

== Personal life and education ==
Jerome was born in Ottawa, Ontario, and lives in Vancouver, British Columbia. She received a Bachelor of Arts from the University of Victoria and a Masters of Fine Arts in writing at the University of Arizona where she studied American Literature. She has two children from her marriage to fellow writer Brad Cran. The two were divorced in 2014.

== Career ==
Jerome has taught poetry and literature at the University of British Columbia, the University of Arizona and Douglas College. She co-edited an oral history project in the Downtown Eastside, in association with Pivot Legal Society who started the community-based photography project Hope In Shadows. She has published poems, essays, book reviews and two books of her own, Jerome has participated for many years in judging the Poetry in Voice contest and the Vancouver Writers Festival. She teaches life writing workshops at the Post at 750 for people who don't consider themselves professional writers but have something meaningful to say. She has also participated in the UBC's Robson Reading Series, as well as an event that was part of the literary series Open Word: Readings and Ideas at the University of Victoria, where she read from her past works and poems she was working on at the time.

Jerome's work touches on many subjects including sexuality, friendship, community, ecological exigencies, and the local, particularly the people and places of her East and South Vancouver neighbourhoods.

=== Canadian women in literary arts ===
Gillian Jerome founded CWILA in 2012 as a response to what she saw as unequal representations of gender and race in literary communities in Canada. CWILA produces an annual count of participating publications and their number of books or reviews written by women, as well as how many women authors they have reviewed. CWILA strives to quantify the barriers that exist for women in literary culture, Their findings aim at enabling discussion and inspiration for action in the literary community in Canada. The non-profit organization works to instill motivation in the literary and review community to create equal coverage and representation. Jerome left her position at Canadian Women in Literary Arts in 2015 to focus on teaching and writing.

=== Geist magazine ===
Geist is a Canadian magazine that brings together fiction and non-fiction, poetry, essays, comics, reviews and photography. The magazine is explained as a mix of ideas and culture. Jerome taught writing workshops at Geist and is a participating editor and writer for the magazine. Jerome has published 14 pieces with Geist. including poetry, essays and book reviews. The themes that come up in her writing include feminism, motherhood, environmentalism, women's rights, housing politics, social justice and community.

=== Hope in Shadows ===
In 2003 Pivot Legal Society started Hope in the Shadows, a photo contest in Vancouver's Downtown Eastside. Pivot Legal Society asked participants to photograph things that were important to them, with the intent that this would give the participants a voice and recognition for their efforts. The initial contest led to the creation of a yearly calendar project where each year's winners are asked to share their story along with their image. This calendar is released in October of every year, and contains the winning photos of the participants chosen by local artists in the city. The calendars are sold through Megaphones vendor program which hires 200 people from low-income backgrounds each season, each vendor keeps half of their sales. There have been 75,000 calendars sold since 2003.

In 2008 the book Hope in Shadows by Jerome and Brad Cran was released through Arsenal Pulp Press and the Pivot Legal Society that compiled 35 different stories attached to winning images from the photo contest. Their book took the stories associated with the winning photographs and expanded them with interviews of the photographers from the photo contest. They wrote about the traumas, abuse and mental illness but also friendship, laughter and love, which were reoccurring themes in the stories of the images. The stories capture the lives of First Nations people who survived residential schools, individuals coping with addictions, and others overcoming loss of loved ones. Hope in Shadows was published in 2009 and soon after this date the calendar sold 5000 more copies. Hope in Shadows won the City of Vancouver Book Award, was shortlisted for the Roderick Haig-Brown Regional Prize, and was longlisted for the George Ryga Award for Social Awareness in Literature.

=== University of British Columbia ===
Jerome has been teaching narrative, research writing and literature in the Department of English Language and Literatures at the University of British Columbia since 2004.

=== EVENT magazine ===
Jerome was an editor and author for the EVENT magazine, a literary magazine that has been publishing poetry, fiction and non-fiction for 46 years in Western Canada. Event is published by Douglas College, a public post-secondary institution in New Westminster, British Columbia, Canada. Jerome started working as Event's Poetry editor in 2010.

== Awards ==
- City of Vancouver Book Award, 2008.
- ReLit Award, 2009 for her poetry collection Red Nest

== Works ==
- Midsummer (2008)
- Hope in the Shadows (2008) Arsenal Pulp Press ISBN 978-1551522388
- Red Nest (2009) Harbour Publishing
- Nevertheless: Walking Poems (2022) Harbour Publishing
