= Kentucky Arts Council =

Kentucky state arts agency

State agency overview
- Formed: 1966; 60 years ago
- Jurisdiction: Commonwealth of Kentucky
- Headquarters: Frankfort, Kentucky
- State agency executive: Chris Cathers, Executive Director
- Parent department: Kentucky Tourism, Arts and Heritage Cabinet
- Website: artscouncil.ky.gov

The Kentucky Arts Council, established in 1966, is the Kentucky state arts agency, and is responsible for developing and promoting support for the arts in Kentucky. Part of the Kentucky Tourism, Arts and Heritage Cabinet, the Kentucky Arts Council is publicly funded by the Kentucky General Assembly and the National Endowment for the Arts, an independent agency of the United States federal government. The council's 14-person board of directors serve four-year terms.

== History ==
In 2016 the council's budget was cut by $170,00, spread over two and a half years. Its budget had been $3.7 million. The following year the National Endowment for the Arts awarded $746,500 to the council, a 5% increase from 2016 funding.

In March 2019 the council took on a new executive director, Chris Cathers. He had been interim executive director since 2017.

In January 2021 the council honored the nine 2020 recipients of the Kentucky Governor's Awards in the Arts in a virtual ceremony. The Awards have been given since 1977.

In May 2021 it was announced that Kentucky would receive more than $800,000 in federal funding to support recovery of the state's arts industry as it recovers from the COVID-19 pandemic in Kentucky. The council will determine how the funding will be distributed to arts organizations in Kentucky.
