= Autumn House Press =

American non-profit publishing company

- Founded: 1998; 28 years ago
- Founder: Michael Simms
- Country of origin: United States
- Headquarters location: Pittsburgh, Pennsylvania
- Distribution: The University of Chicago Press
- Key people: Christine Stroud, Mike Good, Robert Yune, Ed Simon
- Publication types: Books
- Official website: www.autumnhouse.org

Autumn House Press is an independent nonprofit literary publishing company based in Pittsburgh.

== History ==
Autumn House Press was founded in 1998 by Michael Simms when prominent American publishers started reducing their poetry lists and contemporary poets were left without publishers. Over time, Autumn House started publishing fiction and non-fiction titles as well as poetry. Since its founding, Autumn House has published over 100 titles, including collections of poetry, short stories, and essays as well as memoirs, novels, anthologies, and poetry chapbooks, most of which are still in print.

In 2016, founder and then-editor-in-chief Michael Simms retired after 18 years. Christine Stroud took on the role of editor-in-chief and Melissa Becker became board president.

== Books and authors ==
The press publishes books of poetry, fiction, and nonfiction by authors such as Ada Limón, Ed Ochester, Gerald Stern, Patricia Jabbeh Wesley, Sheryl St. Germain, Cameron Barnett, and Michael X. Wang.

The press also publishes comprehensive anthologies including New America: Contemporary Literature for a Changing Society and When She Named Fire: An Anthology of Contemporary Poetry by American Women.

Autumn House Press titles have been reviewed in Publishers Weekly, Booklist, The Georgia Review, The Hollins Critic, The Times Literary Supplement, and the Washington Independent Review of Books. Poems and excerpts have been featured in The New York Times Magazine, The Slowdown, American Life in Poetry, Literary Hub, The Millions, and Cleveland Review of Books. The press was featured in Ploughshares as part of their "Indie Spotlight" interview series.

== Prizes ==
Autumn House holds annual contests in poetry, fiction, and nonfiction; the winners of which receive publication of a full-length manuscript, a $1,000 advance against royalties, and a $1,500 travel/publicity grant to promote their book. Previous fiction winners include Michael X. Wang's Further News of Defeat: Stories in 2019 and Sharma Shields's Favorite Monster in 2011. Melissa Wiley won the nonfiction prize in 2019 for Skull Cathedral: A Vestigial Anatomy. Poetry winners include lucky wreck by Ada Limón in 2005, The Moons of August by Danusha Laméris in 2013, and makalani bandele's under the aegis of a winged mind in 2019.

The press also awards the Rising Writer Prize in poetry and, beginning in 2021, in fiction. The prizes are awarded for first full-length books by authors who are 36 or younger. Winners receive publication and a cash prize. Previous winners include Dennis James Sweeney's In the Antarctic Circle, Eric Tran's The Gutter Spread Guide to Prayer, and Cameron Barnett's The Drowning Boy's Guide to Water.
