= Cate Marvin =

American poet

- Education: Marlboro College (BA); University of Houston (MFA); University of Iowa (MFA); University of Cincinnati (PhD)
- Occupation: Poet
- Writing career
- Notable awards: Kate Tufts Discovery Award (2002); Whiting Award (2007)

Cate Marvin is an American poet.

== Life ==
She graduated from Marlboro College (BA, 1993), University of Houston (MFA, 1997), University of Iowa (MFA, 1999) and University of Cincinnati (Ph.D., 2003) She has taught at the College of Staten Island, City University of New York, Columbia University and in the English Department of Colby College.

Her work has appeared in Ploughshares, Fence, The New England Review, Poetry, The Kenyon Review, The Paris Review, The Cincinnati Review, Slate, Verse, Boston Review, Ninth Letter, and TriQuarterly.

== Awards ==
- 2000 Kathryn A. Morton Prize, for World’s Tallest Disaster by Robert Pinsky
- 2002 Kate Tufts Discovery Award from Claremont Graduate University.
- 2007 NYFA Fellow
- 2007 Whiting Award
- 2009 James Merrill House Fellowship
- 2015 Guggenheim Fellowship

== Publications ==
=== Poems ===
- "I Live Where the Leaves Are Pointed", Fishouse
- "Azalea", Fishouse
- "Monsterful", Ploughshares, Spring 2007
- "Robotripping", Ploughshares, Spring 2006
- "I Live Where the Leaves Are Pointed", Ploughshares, Spring 2000
- "The Pet", Slate, January 14, 2003

=== Full-length poetry collections ===
- World’s Tallest Disaster, Sarabande Books 2001
- Fragment of the Head of a Queen, Sarabande Books 2007
- Oracle, WW Norton 2015
- Event Horizon, Copper Canyon Press 2022

=== Editor ===
- with Michael Dumanis, Legitimate dangers: American poets of the new century, Sarabande Books 2006
