= 2014 in poetry =

Nationality words link to articles with information on the nation's poetry or literature (for instance, Irish or France).

== Events ==
- January – Five fragments of nine poems, some previously unknown, by Greek poet Sappho are discovered on ancient papyrus, including the Brothers Poem. This news is being reported by multiple news sources by the end of the month.
- January 7 – Michel Pleau is named Canadian Parliamentary Poet Laureate (or Canada's new poet laureate), beginning a two-year mandate to "draw Canadians’ attention to the reading and writing of poetry."
- January 29 – Hashem Shabani, an Arab–Iranian poet, was executed by hanging in an unidentified Iranian prison after Iranian President Hassan Rouhani approved the sentences.
- March 7 – For the first time ever, all five poets laureate of the British Isles are women and for the first time all five perform together at the Women of the World festival in London on the eve of International Women's Day. The poets are: Carol Ann Duffy (England), Liz Lochhead (Scotland), Gillian Clarke (Wales), Paula Meehan (Ireland), and Sinéad Morrissey (Northern Ireland).
- March 19 – PEN International comes out with an action appeal protesting the two-year prison sentence handed down to Egyptian poet Omar Hazek. PEN states that this poet has been "imprisoned for peacefully exercising his right to freedom of expression and assembly." Hazek, who has won several poetry awards and is a former employee of the Bibliotheca Alexandrina, has been held in custody since early December 2013.
- April 22 – The Writers' Trust of Canada announces the new Latner Writers' Trust Poetry Prize, a new Canadian literary award to honour the body of work of a Canadian poet who has published at least three volumes of poetry. The award is slated to be presented for the first time in November.
- May 22 – The translation of Beowulf by J. R. R. Tolkien, which he had first completed in 1926, is published in England (after nearly 90 years) as Beowulf: A Translation and Commentary (his essay "On Translating Beowulf" had been published in 1940).
- June 12 – The Library of Congress selects Charles Wright as the new United States Poet Laureate, succeeding Natasha Trethewey.
- August 22 – New Zealand celebrates its own National Poetry Day, now in its 17th year, with more than 60 events held around the country. Included among the various readings and contests are events sponsoring the current New Zealand Poet Laureate, Vincent O’Sullivan, who reads poetry in Dunedin, and 2007–2009 Poet Laureate, Michele Leggott, who MCs the annual Auckland Library event.

== Anniversaries ==
- January 28 – On this day 75 years ago, W. B. Yeats died in Menton, France.
- February 21 – Christopher Marlowe's 450th birthday celebrated (may or may not be his birthday).
- March 9 – On this day 20 years ago, Charles Bukowski died (1994).
- March 31 – On this day 100 years ago, Nobel Prize-winning Mexican poet Octavio Paz was born (1914).
- April 23 – It is assumed that William Shakespeare was born on this day 450 years ago (because records show that he was baptised on April 26).
- May – The 100th anniversary of Gertrude Stein's Tender Buttons.
- September 4 – On this day 100 years ago, French poet and essayist Charles Péguy, 41 (born 1873) was killed in action near Villeroy, Seine-et-Marne, in the early months of World War I
- October 10 – On this day 100 years ago, German poet Ernst Stadler, 31 (born 1883) was killed in battle at Zandvoorde near Ypres.
- October 15 [O.S. October 3] 1814 – On this day 200 years ago Mikhail Lermontov was born; he is sometimes referred to as "Russia's second-greatest poet."
- October 25 – On this day 100 years ago, American poet John Berryman (given name:John Allyn Smith) was born.
- October 27 – On this day 100 years ago, Welsh poet Dylan Thomas was born in Swansea.
- October 30 – On this day 100 years ago, American poet and publisher James Laughlin, founder of New Directions Publishers, was born.
- November 3 – On this day 100 years ago, Austrian poet Georg Trakl, 27, committed suicide.

== Works published in English ==
=== Australia ===
- Benedict Andrews. Lens Flare. Sydney: Pitt Street Poetry
- Louis Armand. Indirect Objects. Sydney: Vagabond Press
- Judith Beveridge. Devadatta's Poems. Artarmon: Giramondo Publishing Company
- a.j. carruthers. AXIS Book 1: Areal. Tokyo: Vagabond Press
- Paul Carter. Ecstacies and Elegies. Perth: UWAP
- Melinda Bufton. Girlery. Hobart: Inken Publisch
- Nandi Chinna. Swamp. Fremantle: Fremantle Press
- Eileen Chong. Peony. Sydney: Pitt Street Poetry
- Dan Disney. Mannequin’s Guide to Utopias. Macau: ASM,
- Benjamin Dodds. Regulator. Glebe: Puncher and Wattmann
- Laurie Duggan. Allotments. Bristol: Shearsman Books
- Anne Elvey. Kin. Parkville: Five Islands Press
- Geoff Goodfellow. Opening the Windows to Catch the Sea Breeze. Kent Town: Wakefield Press
- Libby Hart. Wild. Sydney: Pitt Street Poetry
- Vrasidas Karalis and Helen Nickas, editors. Antigone Kefala: a writer’s journey. Brighton: Owl Publishing
- Jacinta Le Plastrier. The Book of Skins. St Kilda: John Leonard Press
- Alan Loney. eMailing flowers to Mondrian. Malvern East: Hawk Press
- Kent MacCarter. Sputnik’s Cousin. Yarraville: Transit Lounge Publishing
- John Mateer. Emptiness: Asian Poems, 1998 – 2012. Fremantle: Fremantle Press
- Page, Geoff (ed.), The Best Australian Poems 2014, Black Inc. ISBN 978-1-8639-5697-0
- Paul Scully. An Existential Grammar. North Hobart: Walleah Press
- Marie Slaight & Terrence Tasker. The Antigone Poems. Potts Point: Altaire Publications
- Maria Takolander. The End of the World. Artarmon: Giramondo Publishing Company
- Tim Thorne. The Unspeak Poems and Other Verses. North Hobart: Walleah Press
- Ann Vickery & John Hawke, editors. Poetry and The Trace. Glebe: Puncher and Wattmann
- Chris Wallace-Crabbe. My Feet Are Hungry. Sydney: Pitt Street Poetry
- Lucy Williams. Internal Weather. North Hobart: Walleah Press

=== Canada ===
- Joanne Arnott – Halfling Spring
- John Barton – Polari
- Shane Book – Congotronic
- Christopher Levenson – Night Vision
- Garth Martens – Prologue for the Age of Consequence
- Arleen Paré – Lake of Two Mountains

==== Anthologies in Canada ====
- Why Poetry Sucks: Humorous Avant-Garde and Post-Avant English Canadian Poetry, Jonathan Ball & Ryan Fitzpatrick, editors. (Insomniac Press) ISBN 9781554831227
- Under the Mulberry Tree: poems for & about Raymond Souster, James Deahl, editor. (Quattro Books) ISBN 9781927443637

=== India ===
- Ranjit Hoskote, Central Time, Penguin India, ISBN 978-06-700868-1-8

=== New Zealand ===
- Airini Beautrais, Dear Neil Roberts, Victoria University Press
- Kay McKenzie Cooke, Born to a Red-Headed Woman, Otago University Press
- Chris Tse, How to be Dead in a Year of Snakes, Auckland University Press

==== Poets in Best New Zealand Poems ====
Poems from these 25 poets were selected by Mark Williams and Jane Stafford for Best New Zealand Poems 2013, published online this year:

- Fleur Adcock
- Hinemoana Baker
- Sarah Broom
- Amy Brown
- Kate Camp
- Mary-Jane Duffy
- Murray Edmond
- Johanna Emeney
- Cliff Fell
- Bernadette Hall
- Dinah Hawken
- Caoilinn Hughes
- Anna Jackson
- Anne Kennedy
- Michele Leggott
- Therese Lloyd
- Selina Tusitala Marsh
- John Newton
- Gregory O'Brien
- Rachel O'Neill (poet)
- Vincent O'Sullivan
- Elizabeth Smither
- Chris Tse
- Ian Wedde
- Ashleigh Young

=== United Kingdom ===
==== England ====
- Liz Berry, Black Country (Chatto)
- Colette Bryce, The Whole & Rain-domed Universe (Picador; Northern Ireland poet in England)
- John Burnside, All One Breath (Cape)
- Yrsa Daley-Ward, Bone
- Lavinia Greenlaw, A Double Sorrow: Troilus and Criseyde (Faber)
- Selima Hill, The Sparkling Jewel of Naturism (Bloodaxe Books)
- Kei Miller, The Cartographer Tries to Map a Way to Zion (Carcanet; Jamaican poet in England)
- Joss Sheldon, Involution & Evolution: A rhyming anti-war novel
- Rosemary Tonks (died April 15), Bedouin of the London Evening: Collected Poems (Bloodaxe Books)
- Hugo Williams, I Knew the Bride (Faber)

==== Ireland ====
- Harry Clifton, The Holding Centre: Selected Poems 1974–2004 (BloodAxe Books)

==== Scotland ====
- Stewart Conn, The Touch of Time: New & Selected Poems (BloodAxe Books)

==== Wales ====
- Jonathan Edwards, My Family and Other Superheroes (Seren)

==== Anthologies in the United Kingdom ====
- Ten: the new wave, edited by Karen McCarthy Woolf (BloodAxe) ISBN 1 78037 110 1 – new poetry voices in Britain including Mona Arshi, Jay Bernard, Kayo Chingonyi, Rishi Dastidar, Edward Doegar, Inua Ellams, Sarah Howe, Adam Lowe, Eileen Pun and Warsan Shire

==== Criticism, scholarship and biography in the United Kingdom ====
- Laura Jansen – The Roman Paratext: Frame, Texts, Readers. (Cambridge University Press) ISBN 978-1107024366

=== United States ===
- James Baldwin, Jimmy's Blues and Other Poems (Beacon Press)
- Jared Carter, Darkened Rooms of Summer, (University of Nebraska Press)
- Kendra DeColo, Thieves in the Afterlife (Saturnalia Books)
- Arkadii Dragomoshchenko, Endarkment: Selected Poems, edited by Eugene Ostashevsky, translated by Lyn Hejinian, Genya Turovskaya, Eugene Ostashevsky, Bela Shayevich, Jacob Edmund & Elena Balashova (Wesleyan University)
- Tarfia Faizullah, Seam (So. Illinois Univ. Press)
- Lizzie Harris, STOP WANTING (Cleveland State University Poetry Center)
- Matthea Harvey, If The Tabloids Are True, What Are You? (Graywolf Press)
- Chloe Honum, The Tulip-Flame (Cleveland State University Poetry Center)
- Fanny Howe, Second Childhood (Graywolf Press)
- Saeed Jones, Prelude to Bruise (Coffee House Press)
- Keetje Kuipers, The Keys to the Jail (BOA Editions)
- Cathy Linh Che, Split (Alice james Books)
- Sally Wen Mao, Mad Honey Symposium (Alice James Books)
- Michael Mlekoday, The Dead Eat Everything (Kent State University Press)
- Eugenia Leigh, Blood, Sparrows and Sparrows (Four Way Books)
- D. A. Powell, Repast (Graywolf Press)
- George Quasha, Speaking Animate (preverbs) (Between Editions)
- Claudia Rankine, Citizen: An American Lyric (Graywolf Press)
- Spencer Reece, The Road to Emmaus (Farrar, Straus and Giroux)
- Nicholas Samaras, "American Psalm, World Psalm" (Ashland Poetry Press)
- Danez Smith, [insert] Boy (YesYes Books)
- Ron Silliman – Northern Soul, (Shearsman)
- R. A. Villanueva, Reliquaria (University of Nebraska Press)
- Caki Wilkinson, The Wynona Stone Poems (Persea Press)
- Jake Adam York, Abide (So. Illinois Univ. Press)
- Kevin Young – Book of Hours, (Knopf)

==== Anthologies in the United States ====
- David Biespiel, editor. Poems of the American South (Random House)
- Carolyn Forché & Duncan Wu, editors. Poetry of Witness: The Tradition in English, 1500–2001 (W. W. Norton)

==== Criticism, scholarship and biography in the United States ====
- John Drury – Music at Midnight: The Life and Poetry of George Herbert. (University of Chicago Press)
- Tom Hawkins – Iambic Poetics in the Roman Empire (Cambridge University Press)
- Ron Silliman – Against Conceptual Poetry (Counterpath Press)

== Works published in other languages ==
=== German ===
- Antony Theodore, Gottliche Augenblicke : Eine Reise durch das Jahr, ISBN 978-39-408532-5-7

== Awards and honors by country ==
Awards announced this year:

=== International ===
- Struga Poetry Evenings Golden Wreath Laureate: to Ko Un (South Korea)

=== Australia awards and honors ===
- C. J. Dennis Prize for Poetry: Jennifer Maiden, Liquid Nitrogen
- Kenneth Slessor Prize for Poetry: Fiona Hile, Novelties
- Prime Minister's Literary Awards: Melinda Smith, Drag Down to Unlock or Place an Emergency Call

=== Canada awards and honors ===
- Archibald Lampman Award: David O'Meara, A Pretty Sight
- Atlantic Poetry Prize: Don Domanski, Bite Down Little Whisper
- 2014 Governor General's Awards: Arleen Paré, Lake of Two Mountains (English); José Acquelin, Anarchie de la lumière (French)
- Griffin Poetry Prize:
  - Canada: Anne Carson, Red Doc>
  - International: Brenda Hillman, Seasonal Works with Letters on Fire
  - Lifetime Recognition Award (presented by the Griffin trustees) to Adelia Prado
- Latner Writers' Trust Poetry Prize: Ken Babstock
- Gerald Lampert Award: Murray Reiss, The Survival Rate of Butterflies in the Wild
- Pat Lowther Award: Alexandra Oliver, Meeting the Tormentors in Safeway
- Prix Alain-Grandbois: Michaël Trahan, Nœud coulant
- Raymond Souster Award: Anne Compton, Alongside
- Dorothy Livesay Poetry Prize: Jordan Abel, The Place of Scraps
- Prix Émile-Nelligan: Roxanne Desjardins, Ciseaux

=== France awards and honors ===
- Prix Goncourt de la Poésie: William Cliff

=== New Zealand awards and honors ===
- Prime Minister's Awards for Literary Achievement:
- New Zealand Post Book Awards:
  - Poetry Award winner: Vincent O'Sullivan, Us, then. Victoria University Press
  - NZSA Jessie Mackay Best First Book Award for Poetry: Marty Smith, Horse with Hat. Victoria University Press

=== India awards and honors ===
- Sahitya Akademi Award : Adil Jussawalla for Trying to Say Goodbye (English)

=== United Kingdom awards and honors ===
- Cholmondeley Award: W. N. Herbert, Jeremy Hooker, John James, Glyn Maxwell, Denise Riley
- Costa Book Awards poetry award: Jonathan Edwards, My Family and Other Superheroes
  - Shortlist: Colette Bryce, The Whole & Rain-domed Universe; Lavinia Greenlaw, A Double Sorrow: Troilus and Criseyde; Kei Miller, The Cartographer Tries to Map a Way to Zion
- English Association's Fellows' Poetry Prizes:
- Eric Gregory Award (for a collection of poems by a poet under the age of 30):
- Forward Prizes for Poetry:
  - Best Collection: Kei Miller, The Cartographer Tries to Map a Way to Zion
    - Shortlist: Colette Bryce, The Whole & Rain-domed Universe; John Burnside, All One Breath; Louise Glück, Faithful and Virtuous Night; Hugo Williams, I Knew the Bride
  - Felix Dennis Prize for Best First Collection: Liz Berry, Black Country
    - Shortlist:
  - Best Poem: Stephen Santus, "In a Restaurant"
    - Shortlist:
- Jerwood Aldeburgh First Collection Prize for poetry:
  - Shortlist:
- Manchester Poetry Prize:
- National Poet of Wales: Gillian Clarke (since 2008)
- National Poetry Competition : Roger Philip Dennis for Corkscrew Hill Photo
- T. S. Eliot Prize (United Kingdom and Ireland): David Harsent, Fire Songs
  - Shortlist (announced in November 2014): 2014 Short List
- The Times/Stephen Spender Prize for Poetry Translation:

=== United States awards and honors ===
- Agnes Lynch Starrett Poetry Prize: Nate Marshall for Wild Hundreds
- AML Award for Poetry awarded to Kristen Eliason for Picture Dictionary
  - Finalists: Kimberly Johnson, Uncommon Prayer and Made Flesh: Sacrament and Poetics in Post-Reformation England; Laura Stott, In the Museum of Coming and Going
- Arab American Book Award (The George Ellenbogen Poetry Award): Philip Metres, A Concordance of Leaves
  - Honorable mentions: Farid Matuk, My Daughter La Chola; Fady Joudah, Alight
- Best Translated Book Award (BTBA): Elisa Biagini, The Guest in the Wood
- Beatrice Hawley Award from Alice James Books: Richie Hofmann, Second Empire
- Bollingen Prize:
- Dwarf Stars Award: Mat Joiner, And Deeper than Did Ever Plummet Sound
- Elgin Award:
  - Bryan Thao Worra, Demonstra (Book)
  - Helen Marshall, The Sex Lives of Monsters (Chapbook)
- Jackson Poetry Prize: Claudia Rankine.
  - Judges: Tracy K. Smith, David St. John, and Mark Strand
- Lambda Literary Award:
  - Gay Poetry: Rigoberto González, Unpeopled Eden
  - Lesbian Poetry: Ana Božičević, Rise in the Fall
- Lenore Marshall Poetry Prize:
- Los Angeles Times Book Prize:
  - Finalists: Joshua Beckman, The Inside of an Apple (Wave Books); Mei-mei Berssenbrugge, Hello, the Roses (New Directions); Ron Padgett, Collected Poems (Coffee House Press); Elizabeth Robinson On Ghosts (Solid Objects); Lynn Xu, Debts & Lessons (Omnidawn)
- National Book Award for Poetry (NBA):
  - NBA Finalists:
    - Louise Glück, Faithful and Virtuous Night
    - Fanny Howe, Second Childhood
    - Maureen N. McLane, This Blue
    - Fred Moten, The Feel Trio
    - Claudia Rankine, Citizen: An American Lyric
  - NBA Longlist:
    - Linda Bierds, Roget's Illusion
    - Brian Blanchfield, A Several World
    - Edward Hirsch, Gabriel: A Poem
    - Spencer Reece, The Road to Emmaus
    - Mark Strand, Collected Poems
- National Book Critics Circle Award for Poetry:
- The New Criterion Poetry Prize: Fix Quiet by John Poch
- Pulitzer Prize for Poetry (United States): Vijay Seshadri, 3 Sections
  - Finalists: Morri Creech, The Sleep of Reason and Adrian Matejka, The Big Smoke (Penguin)
- PEN Award for Poetry in Translation: – Judge:
- PEN/Voelcker Award for Poetry: Frank Bidart (Judges: Peg Boyers, Toi Derricotte, and Rowan Ricardo Phillips)
- Raiziss/de Palchi Translation Award:
- Rhysling Award
  - Mary Soon Lee, Interregnum (Long Form)
  - Amal El-Mohtar, Turning the Leaves (Short Form)
- Ruth Lilly Poetry Prize: Nathaniel Mackey
- Kingsley Tufts Poetry Award:
- Wallace Stevens Award:
- Walt Whitman Prize – Hannah Sanghee Park for The Same-Different. – Judge: Rae Armantrout
- Whiting Writers' Award (in Poetry):
- Yale Younger Series:

==== From the Poetry Society of America ====
- Frost Medal: Gerald Stern
- Shelley Memorial Award: Bernadette Mayer
- Writer Magazine/Emily Dickinson Award: Tom Thompson
- Lyric Poetry Award: Meghan Kemp-Gee
- Alice Fay di Castagnola Award: Timothy Donnelly
- Louise Louis/Emily F. Bourne Student Poetry Award: Helen Ross
- George Bogin Memorial Award: Gary Young
- Robert H. Winner Memorial Award: Dore Kiesselbach – Judge: Alberto Rios
- Cecil Hemley Memorial Award: Ari Banias – Judge:
- Norma Farber First Book Award: r. erica doyle
- Lucille Medwick Memorial Award: David Welch
- William Carlos Williams Award: Ron Padgett, Collected Poems (Judge: Thomas Lux)
  - Finalists for WCW Award:

== Deaths ==
Birth years link to the corresponding "[year] in poetry" article:

- January 7 – Alvin Aubert (born 1930), African-American poet and scholar
- January 8 – Madeline Gins, 72 (born 1941), American poet, architect and long-time collaborator with artist Arakawa
- January 9 – Amiri Baraka (LeRoi Jones), 79 (born 1934), controversial African-American poet and writer of drama, fiction, essays and music criticism, and former Poet Laureate of New Jersey
- January 14 – Juan Gelman, 83 (born 1930), exiled Argentine poet and recipient of the Miguel de Cervantes Prize in 2007
- February 1 – René Ricard, 67(?) (born 1946), American poet, art critic, painter, and actor in Andy Warhol's filmsGrow, Kory (February 2, 2014). "Rene Ricard, Poet, Painter, Art Critic and Warhol Superstar, Dead". Rolling Stone. Penske Media Corporation.
- February 6 – Maxine Kumin, 88 (born 1925), U. S. American poet who won the Pulitzer Prize for Poetry, was Poetry Consultant to the Library of Congress (today known as the United States Poet Laureate), and wrote some seventeen books of poetry, novels, story collections, and memoirs
- March 12 – Bill Knott, 74, (born 1940), U. S. American poet who published more than a dozen books of poetry between his first book in 1968 and his death
- March 18 - Lucius Shepard, 70 (born 1943), American writer of science fiction, magical realism and related poetry.
- March 30 – Colleen Lookingbill, 63 (born 1950), U. S. American who edited, with Elizabeth Robinson, the EtherDome Chapbook series for 12 years, which published emerging women poets. She also co-edited Instance Press
- April 2 – Vern Rutsala, 80 (born 1934), U.S. author and poet
- April 14 – Nina Cassian, 89 (born 1924), Romanian poet, journalist, film critic, and translator. She translated works of William Shakespeare, Bertolt Brecht, Christian Morgenstern, Yiannis Ritsos, and Paul Celan into Romanian. She published more than fifty books of her own poetry
- April 15 – Rosemary Tonks, 85 (born 1928), English poet and novelist
- April 24 – Tadeusz Różewicz, 92 (born 1921), Polish poet and playwright, recipient of the Austrian State Prize for European Literature (1982)
- April 28 – Gerard Benson, 83 (born 1931), English poet.
- April 29 – Russell Edson, 76-86 (born 1935), American poet, novelist, writer and illustrator
- May 10 – Hillary Gravendyk, 35 (born 1979), American poet and twice winner of the Eisner Prize in Poetry and author of Harm (Omnidawn, 2012) She lived with Idiopathic pulmonary fibrosis and had a double lung transplant five years before her death.
- May 21 – Ruth Guimarães, 93 (born 1920), Afro-Brazilian classicist, fiction writer and poet
- May 28 – Maya Angelou, 86 (born 1928), American author (I Know Why the Caged Bird Sings), poet ("On the Pulse of Morning") and civil rights activist*June 22 – Felix Dennis, 67 (born 1947), English publisher and poet
- June 27 – Allen Grossman, 82 (born 1932), American poet, critic and professor, winner of the Bollingen Prize in 2009
- June 29 – Dermot Healy, 66 (born 1947), Irish poet, playwright, short story writer, memoirist and novelist
- August 5 – Diann Blakely, 57 (born 1957), American poet, who won the Alice Fay di Castagnola Award among many other honors
- August 19 – Samih al-Qasim, 75 (born 1939), Palestinian Druze poet and journalist
  - Simin Behbahani, 87, Iranian writer and poet
  - Richard Dauenhauer, 72, American poet and translator
- August 27 – Zaccheus Jackson, 36, Vancouver based Canadian Spoken word and Slam poet who was the 2013 Vancouver Grand Slam Champ
- September 21 – Alastair Reid, 88 (born 1926), Scottish poet, essayist, and scholar
- September 28 – Dannie Abse, 91 (born 1923), Welsh poet and doctor
- October 9 – Carolyn Kizer, 89 (born 1925), American poet and Pulitzer Prize winner in 1985
- October 14 – Ron Loewinsohn, 76, American poet and university professor Since his inclusion in Donald Allen's 1960 poetry anthology, The New American Poetry 1945–1960, numerous volumes of his poetry (along with two novels) were published
- October 28 – Galway Kinnell, 87 (born 1927), American poet, Pulitzer Prize winner, a MacArthur Fellow and a former State Poet of Vermont; also served as a Chancellor of the Academy of American Poets
- November 5 – Abdelwahab Meddeb, 68 (born 1946), Tunisian-born poet, Islamic scholar, essayist, novelist; lung cancer
- November 13 – Manoel de Barros, 97 (born 1916), Brazilian poet who, before his death, considered by many authors, critics and readers to be Brazil's greatest living poet
- November 19 – Jon Stallworthy, 79 (born 1935), English academic, poet and literary critic. Biographer of Wilfred Owen and Louis MacNeice
- November 29 – Mark Strand, 80 (born 1934), Canadian-born American poet and writer, United States Poet Laureate (1990–1991)
- December 4 – Claudia Emerson, 57 (born 1957), American poet
- December 27 – Tomaž Šalamun, 73 (born 1941), Slovenian poet

== See also ==
- Poetry
- List of poetry awards
