= Robert H. Winner Memorial Award =

The Poetry Society of America's Robert H. Winner Memorial Award is given "by the family and friends of Robert H. Winner, whose first book of poems appeared when he was almost fifty years old. This award acknowledges original work being done in mid-career by a poet who has not had substantial recognition, and is open to poets over forty who have published no more than one book."

Each winner receives a $2500 prize.

- 2025: M. Cynthia Cheung, Judge: Claire Wahmanholm
- 2024: José Edmundo Ocampo Reyes, Judge: Nathan McClain
- 2023: Trey Moody, Judge: Nuar Alsadir
- 2022: Didi Jackson, Judge: Traci Brimhall
- 2021: Melissa Crowe, Judge: Heid E. Erdrich
- 2020: Teri Ellen Cross Davis, Judge: Ray Gonzalez
- 2019: Nancy Chen Long, Judge: Patricia Spears Jones
- 2018: Elizabeth Knapp, Judge: Airea D. Matthews
- 2017: Heather Altfeld, Judge: Fred Marchant
- 2016: Erin Redfern and Metta Sáma, Judge: Cyrus Cassells
- 2015: Karen Skolfield, Judge: Alan Shapiro
- 2014: Dore Kiesselbach, Judge: Alberto Rios
- 2013: Carol Light, Judge: David Wagoner
- 2012: Lise Goett, Judge: Toi Derricotte
- 2011: Kathy Nilsson, Judge: Timothy Donnelly
- 2010: Leslie Williams, Judge: David St. John
- 2009: Eliot Khalil Wilson, Judge: Henri Cole
- 2008: Jocelyn Emerson, Judge: Annie Finch
- 2007: Charlene Fix, Judge: Eleanor Wilner
- 2006: Daneen Wardrop, Judge: Jean Valentine
- 2005: Julie Sheehan, Judge: Sharon Olds
- 2004: John McKernan Jr., Judge: Linda Gregg
- 2003: John Glowney and Rusty Morrison, Judge: Ron Padgett
- 2002: Margo Berdeshevsky, Judge: Marie Ponsot
- 2001: Alice Jones and Jeffrey Franklin

== See also ==
- Poetry Society of America
- List of American literary awards
- List of poetry awards
- List of years in poetry
