= Engine Empire =

2013 poetry collection by Cathy Park Hong

- Author: Cathy Park Hong
- Publisher: W. W. Norton & Company
- Publication date: August 5, 2013
- Pages: 96
- ISBN: 978-0393346480
- Preceded by: Translating Mo'um
- Followed by: Dance Dance Revolution

Engine Empire is a 2013 poetry collection by American poet Cathy Park Hong, published by W. W. Norton & Company. Divided as a trilogy, the book's poems address topics such as industrialization, technology, and diaspora, with fictionalized settings in China and the speculative future.

== Content ==
The book is divided in three sections. The first section, "Ballad of Our Jim", is set in the Wild West and California gold rush. The second section, "Shangdu, My Artful Boomtown!", is set in a fictionalized boomtown resembling Shenzhen. The third section, "The World Cloud", is set in the speculative future where individual consciousnesses have been sublimated into data.

Some poems were originally published in literary magazines such as A Public Space, Conjunctions, and The American Poetry Review. In particular, a few poems from the first section first appeared in an issue of The Paris Review along with an interview with Hong. "Engines Within the Throne" was reprinted in Poets.org.

== Critical reception ==
In a starred review, Publishers Weekly wrote, "This book is full of luminous surprises."

The Poetry Foundation lauded Hong's lyricism and imagination, stating that "Hong's poetry creates whole worlds, instead of being satisfied with representing a small sliver of this one or this I." Slate called it a "sustaining book" that is "frequently giddy with humor and invention". Ploughshares wrote that "Hong’s brazen metaphors and determined personas transform a history of trauma into a sensitivity to the conditions of human survival." The Rumpus called Hong "a strong storyteller as well as conceptual poet" and stated "Hong’s role as artist is also a dual one of both synthesis of the existing ideas and history of a place-time and then creation of new narratives on top of this history." Observing the book's bleak worlds of globalization and capitalism, Gulf Coast said "the skill of Hong’s work is that it highlights how art can interact with these concerns while still being joyful, for there is indeed a lyrical joy to her multiplicity of forms."
