= Donna Masini =

American poet and novelist

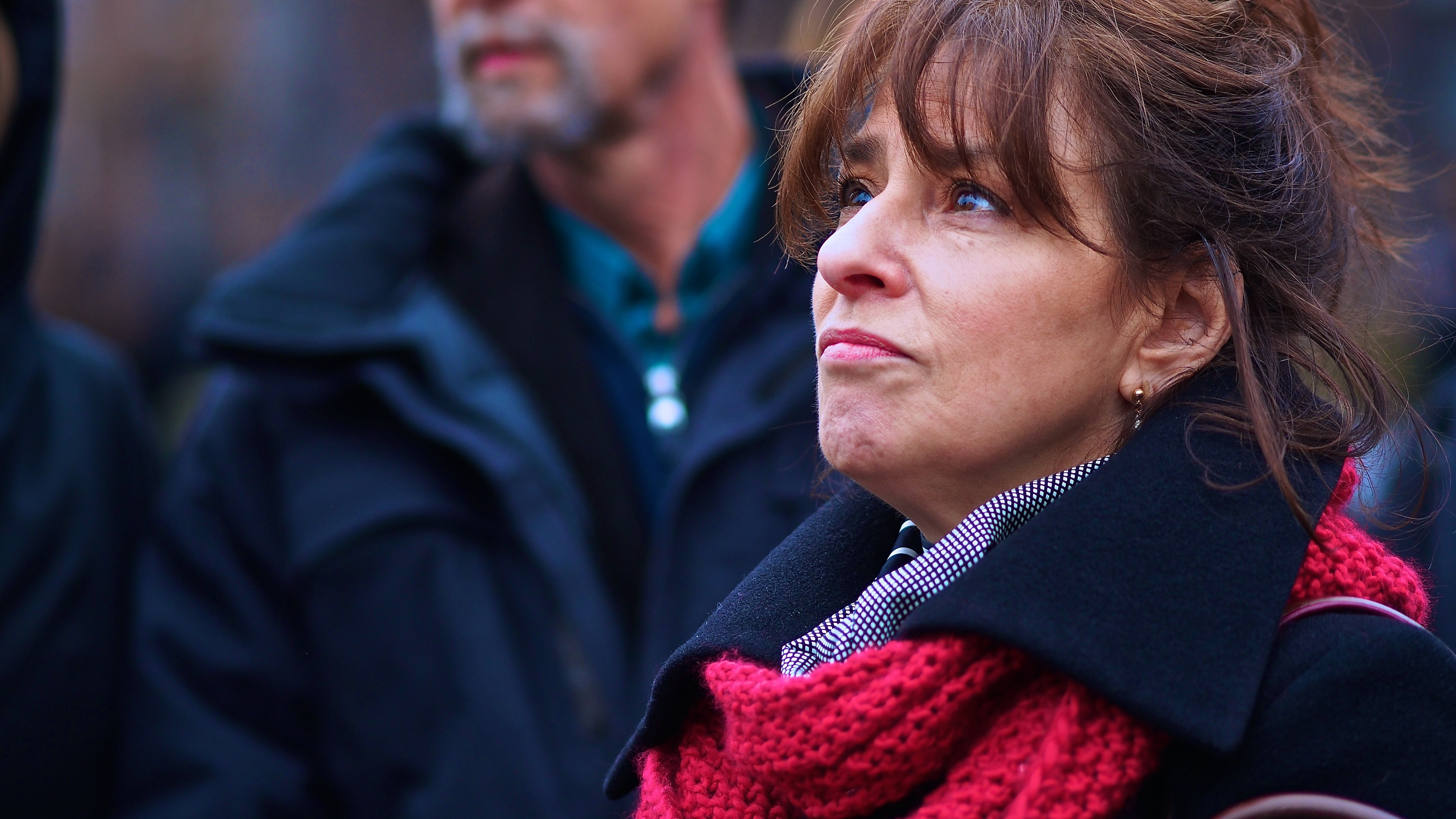
Masini at a poetry rally in Washington Square Park in December 2014

Donna Masini is an American poet, novelist, and professor of English at Hunter College. She has published four poetry collections: That Kind of Danger (1994), Turning to Fiction (2004), 4:30 Movie (2018), and Did You Find Everything You Were Looking For? (2026), as well as the novel About Yvonne (1997).

== Early life and education ==
Masini was born in the Flatbush neighborhood of Brooklyn, New York, and grew up on New York Avenue before her family moved to Staten Island when she was nearly nine years old. In a 2016 interview with Brooklyn Poets, she recalled that the move introduced her to a sense of displacement that later informed her writing. She grew up in the Great Kills neighborhood of Staten Island, living there from age nine until entering Hunter College in 1972. Her father cleaned boilers and enjoyed opera. Masini recalled receiving a library card at the Great Kills Library as an important childhood event.

While studying at Hunter College, Masini took classes with poet James Wright, whom she credited with teaching her how to read poetry and encouraging her literary development. Masini has credited poet Galway Kinnell with influencing her approach to revision, particularly her efforts to preserve the spontaneity of early drafts. In a 2016 interview, she described his advice as formative in the composition of "Giants in the Earth," a poem included in That Kind of Danger.

Masini received an MFA in poetry from New York University in 1988. She began writing poetry at age 28, although she had previously kept journals and notebooks. She attended poetry classes taught by Audre Lorde at Hunter College; in a later interview, she identified Lorde and June Jordan as her first poetry teachers.

== Literary career ==
=== Early poetry and That Kind of Danger ===
Masini's first poetry collection, That Kind of Danger, was published by Beacon Press in 1994. Mona Van Duyn selected the book for the Barnard Women Poets Prize. The collection addresses urban life, sexuality, work, family, and religion. Masini told the Staten Island Advance that the AIDS epidemic informed many of its poems. In a retrospective essay, critic Nick Ripatrazone discussed the collection's treatment of death and fear for loved ones.

Her poems had appeared in literary journals including The Paris Review, Parnassus, and Pequod.

=== About Yvonne ===
By 1996, W. W. Norton & Company had acquired Masini's debut novel, initially described under the working title All About Yvonne. Published as About Yvonne in 1997, the novel follows a New York University professor who suspects her husband of infidelity and becomes consumed by jealousy. In a 1998 paperback roundup, The New York Times cited reviewer Maggie Garb's earlier assessment of the novel as a critique of contemporary Manhattan.

=== Turning to Fiction ===
Masini's second poetry collection, Turning to Fiction, was published by Norton in 2004. In a 2018 review of her poetry, Ripatrazone discussed the poem "Slowly" as an example of Masini's continuing exploration of grief.

=== 4:30 Movie ===
Norton published 4:30 Movie in 2018. The collection explores the death of Masini's sister and draws on film imagery and cinematic techniques to examine grief and time. Reviewing the collection in The Brooklyn Rail, Tony Leuzzi emphasized its cinematic metaphors and formal experimentation. The New York Times included the collection in its May 2018 "New & Noteworthy" roundup.In a 2016 interview with Brooklyn Poets, Masini discussed the development of 4:30 Movie, explaining that her use of film in teaching poetry had influenced the manuscript. She also described how the death of her sister from lung cancer, following a year in which Masini helped care for her, had changed her writing and prompted her to explore different poetic structures.

=== Did You Find Everything You Were Looking For? ===
Masini's fourth poetry collection, Did You Find Everything You Were Looking For?, appeared in 2026. In the Los Angeles Review of Books, Carol Muske-Dukes examined the collection's use of dictionaries, grammar, and everyday speech to consider grief, language, and mortality. The New York Times recommended the collection in a May 2026 Mother's Day books feature, describing its juxtaposition of everyday settings with family loss.

In a May 2026 interview, Masini described the book as combining free verse, prose poems, and notebook poems, and identified Wisława Szymborska and Lydia Davis among her literary influences.

== Teaching and literary activities ==
Masini is a professor in the Department of English at Hunter College. She teaches undergraduate poetry and fiction workshops and graduate poetry workshops and courses in craft and poetics. She has also taught graduate literature classes on Walt Whitman, Emily Dickinson, and twentieth-century American women poets.

Her work has appeared in The New Yorker, American Poetry Review, Ploughshares, The Paris Review, TriQuarterly, and anthologies including The Best American Poetry 2015.

== Awards and honors ==
- Barnard Women Poets Prize, for That Kind of Danger (selected by Mona Van Duyn).
- National Endowment for the Arts fellowship; New York Foundation for the Arts grant; and Pushcart Prize.

== Bibliography ==
=== Poetry collections ===
- That Kind of Danger: Poems. Boston: Beacon Press. 1994. ISBN 978-0-8070-6823-6.
- Turning to Fiction: Poems. New York: W. W. Norton & Company. 2004. ISBN 978-0-393-05970-0.
- 4:30 Movie: Poems. New York: W. W. Norton & Company. 2018. ISBN 978-0-393-63550-8.
- Did You Find Everything You Were Looking For?. New York: W. W. Norton & Company. 2026. ISBN 978-1-324-12419-1.

=== Novels ===
- About Yvonne. New York: W. W. Norton & Company. 1997. ISBN 978-0-393-33546-0.

=== Selected anthologies and collected works ===
- Pamela Gemin; Paula Sergi, eds. (1999). Boomer Girls: Poems by Women from the Baby Boom Generation. University of Iowa Press. ISBN 978-0-87745-687-2.
- Billy Collins, ed. (2005). "Slowly". 180 More: Extraordinary Poems for Every Day. Random House. ISBN 978-0-8129-7296-2.
- Michael Meyer, ed. (2011). The Bedford Introduction to Literature. Macmillan.
- Jerry Williams, ed. (2012). It's Not You, It's Me: Poems of Breakup and Divorce. Overlook Press.
- David Lehman; Sherman Alexie, eds. (2015). The Best American Poetry 2015. Simon & Schuster.
- Brooklyn Poets. Edited by Jason Koo. Brooklyn Arts, 2017.
- Renga for Obama. Edited by Major Jackson. Harvard University, 2017.
