= Will Alexander (poet) =

American poet (born 1948)

- Born: 1948 (age 77–78)
- Education: University of California, Los Angeles (BA)
- Occupations: Poet, novelist, essayist, playwright, visual artist
- Writing career
- Notable awards: American Book Award (2013)

Will Alexander (born 1948) is an American poet, novelist, essayist, playwright, and visual artist. He received a Whiting Fellowship for Poetry in 2001 and a California Arts Council Fellowship in 2002.

== Life ==
He earned a BA in English and creative writing from the University of California–Los Angeles in 1972.

His work has appeared in BOMB, Boston Review, Entropy, Chicago Review, Denver Quarterly, Fence, jubilat, and The Nation.

Alexander's poetry and visual art are greatly influenced by his readings of Bob Kaufman, Octavio Paz, and Francophone Negritude writers such as Aimé Césaire and Jean-Joseph Rabéarivelo. Alexander describes the effect of their themes of cosmic isolation from society and interior discovery as an "alchemical metamorphosis". Much of his work is characterized by his powerful mixing of metaphor and sophisticated language. According to the Poetry Foundation, his work is frequently described as surreal.

== Awards ==
- 2016 — Jackson Poetry Prize (awarded by Poets & Writers)
- 2014 — American Book Award for Singing In Magnetic Hoofbeat: Essays, Prose, Texts, Interviews, and a Lecture
- 2002 — California Arts Council Fellowship
- 2001 — Whiting Fellowship for Poetry

== Works ==
- Vertical Rainbow Climber (poems), Jazz Press, 1987.
- Arcane Lavender Morals (short fiction chapbook), Leave Books, 1994.
- The Stratospheric Canticles (poems), Pantograph Press, 1995. ISBN 1-880766-08-6
- Asia & Haiti (two long poems), Sun & Moon Press, 1995. ISBN 1-55713-189-9
- Above the Human Nerve Domain (poems), Pavement Saw Press, 1998. ISBN 1-886350-81-7
- Towards the Primeval Lightning Field (philosophical essays), O Books, 1998. ISBN 1-882022-30-0; revised second edition published by Litmus Press, 2014. ISBN 978-1-933959-20-7
- Exobiology as Goddess (two long poems), Manifest Press, 2004. ISBN 978-0-9673885-8-8
- Sunrise In Armageddon (novel), Spuyten Duyvil Press, 2006. ISBN 978-1-933132-17-4
- Inalienable Recognitions (essays), Tract Series #4. eohippus labs, 2009.
- The Sri Lankan Loxodrome (one long and five short poems), New Directions Publishing, 2009. ISBN 978-0-8112-1829-0
- On the Substance of Disorder (essays), [Parrot 7]. Insert Press, 2010.
- Compression & Purity (poems), City Lights, 2011. ISBN 978-0-87286-541-9
- Diary As Sin (novel), Skylight Press, 2011. ISBN 978-1-908011-13-8
- Inside the Earthquake Palace: 4 Plays (theatre), Chax Press, 2011. ISBN 978-0-925904-89-8
- Mirach Speaks to his Grammatical Transparents (philosophical essays), Oyster Moon Press, 2011. ISBN 978-0-578-08445-9
- The Brimstone Boat - For Philip Lamantia (long poem from 2000, and essays), Rêve à Deux, 2012. ISBN 978-0-578-09589-9
- Singing in Magnetic Hoofbeat: Essays, Prose Texts, Interviews and a Lecture 1991–2007 (prose anthology), Essay Press, 2012. ISBN 978-0-9791189-7-5
- Kaleidoscopic Omniscience: Asia & Haiti/ The Stratospheric Canticles/ Impulse & Nothingness (poetry anthology), Skylight Press, 2012. ISBN 978-1-908011-49-7
- The Transparent as Witness (collaborative prose), Will Alexander & Janice Lee. Solar Luxuriance, 2013.
- The Codex Mirror: 60 Drawings by Byron Baker & 60 Writings by Will Alexander (aphorisms), Anon Edition, 2015. ISBN 978-1-312620-47-6
- Based on the Bush of Ghosts (long poem, chapbook), Staging Ground, 2015.
- Spectral Hieroglyphics: A Poetic Troika (three long poems), illustrated by Rik Lina. Rêve à Deux, 2016.
- Alien Weaving (novella) Anonymous Energy, 2016.
- Secrets Prior to the Sun (essay), White Print Inc, 2016.
- The Audiographic As Data (collaborative automatic writing), Will Alexander & Carlos Lara. Oyster Moon Press, 2016.
- At Night on the Sun (play), Chax Press, 2017.
- Colloquy at the Abyss (conversation with Harold Abramowitz), Insert Blanc Press, 2017.
- Across the Vapour Gulf (aphorisms), New Directions, 2017.
- Phosphenic Threadings (two short prose pieces), Evidence Publications, 2018.
- A Cannibal Explains Himself To Himself (essays), The Elephants, 2019.
- Dialogics (conversation with Heller Levinson), Concrete Mist Press, 2020.
- The Combustion Cycle (three long poems), Roof Books, 2021.
- Refractive Africa (three long poems), New Directions, 2021. ISBN 9780811230278.
- Dialogics Volume 2 (conversation with Heller Levinson), Anvil Tongue Books, 2022.
- The Contortionist Whispers (essays), Action Books, 2022.
- Divine Blue Light (for John Coltrane) (poems), City Lights, 2022. ISBN 9780872868700.
