= Sandra Beasley =

American poet and non-fiction writer

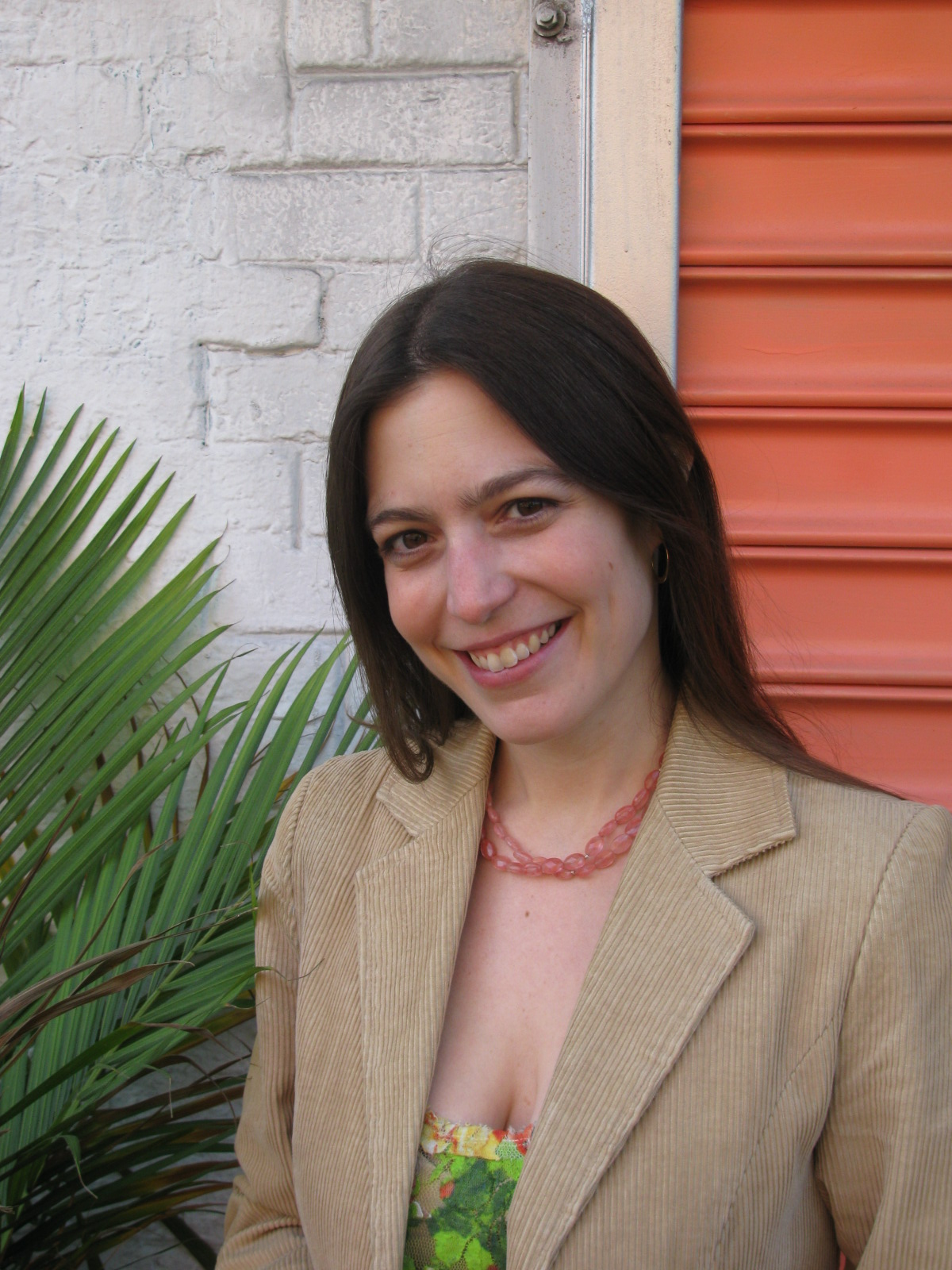
- Born: May 5, 1980 (age 46); Vienna, Virginia
- Education: University of Virginia; American University
- Writing career
- Language: English
- Genres: Poetry; Memoir
- Notable awards: Barnard Women Poets Prize
- Website: www.sandrabeasley.com

Sandra Beasley (born May 5, 1980, Vienna, Virginia) is an American poet and non-fiction writer.

== Background ==
Beasley graduated from Thomas Jefferson High School for Science and Technology, earned a B.A. in English magna cum laude from the University of Virginia, and later received an MFA degree from American University.

== Career ==
For several years she worked as an editor at The American Scholar before leaving the position to write full-time.

Beasley is the author of the poetry collections Theories of Falling (New Issues, 2008) and I Was the Jukebox, (W.W. Norton, 2010), as well as the memoir Don't Kill the Birthday Girl: Tales from an Allergic Life (Crown, 2011), which is also a cultural history of food allergies. Her poetry has been anthologized in The Best American Poetry 2010, Poetry Daily, Verse Daily, and Best New Poets 2005, as well as such journals as Poetry, The Believer, AGNI online, Blackbird, Barrelhouse, Copper Nickel, Gulf Coast, and Black Warrior Review. She was a regular contributor to the "XX Files" column for the Washington Post Magazine and more recently her prose has appeared in the Wall Street Journal and Psychology Today.

A selection of her poems appeared in the handmade, collective minimag Four by Two, helmed by klipschutz (pen name of Kurt Lipschutz) and Jeremy Gaulke, published between 2014 and 2017, The complete 12-issue run of the minimag was purchased by UC Berkeley's Bancroft Library, for inclusion in its Special Collections.

Beasley has received fellowships to the University of Mississippi (as the Summer Poet in Residence), the Sewanee Writers' Conference (Walter E. Dakin Fellowship), and Virginia Center for the Creative Arts (two Cafritz Fellowships), among others honors. She serves on the Board for the Writer's Center and is also a member of the Arts Club of Washington.

== Honors and awards ==
- 2015 Cavafy Prize from Poetry International
- 2010 Summer Poet in Residence fellowship at the University of Mississippi
- 2010 LegalArt Residence
- 2010 Artist Fellowship from the DC Commission on the Arts and Humanities
- 2009 Friends of Poetry Prize from the Poetry Foundation
- 2009 Cafritz Fellowship to Virginia Center for Creative Arts
- 2009 Barnard Women Poets Prize, selected by Joy Harjo
- 2008 Walter E. Dakin Fellowship to the Sewanee Writers' Conference
- 2008 Maureen Egen Exchange Award from Poets & Writers
- 2007 New Issues Poetry Prize, selected by Marie Howe
- 2006 Elinor Benedict Poetry Prize from Passages North at Northern Michigan University
- 2005 Cafritz Fellowship to Virginia Center for Creative Arts

== Published works ==
- Beasley, Sandra (2021). Made to explode : poems. New York, NY. ISBN 978-0-393-53160-2.
- Beasley, Sandra (2015). Count the Waves: Poems. New York, NY: W. W. Norton. p. 96. ISBN 978-0-393-24320-8.
- Beasley, Sandra (2011). Don't Kill the Birthday Girl: Tales from an Allergic Life. New York, NY: Crown Publishing Group. pp. 240. ISBN 978-0-307-58811-1.
- Beasley, Sandra (2010). I Was the Jukebox: Poems. New York, NY: W. W. Norton. p. 90. ISBN 978-0-393-07651-6.
- Beasley, Sandra (2008). Theories of Falling: Poems. Kalamazoo, MI: New Issues Poetry & Prose. p. 64. ISBN 978-1-930974-74-6.

== Translated works ==
- Die Abtastnadel in der Rille eines traurigen Lieds. Selected poems. Bilingual edition (German, English). Berlin: Hochroth Press, 2011. pp. 28. ISBN 978-3-942161-13-8
