= Ruth Forman =

American poet

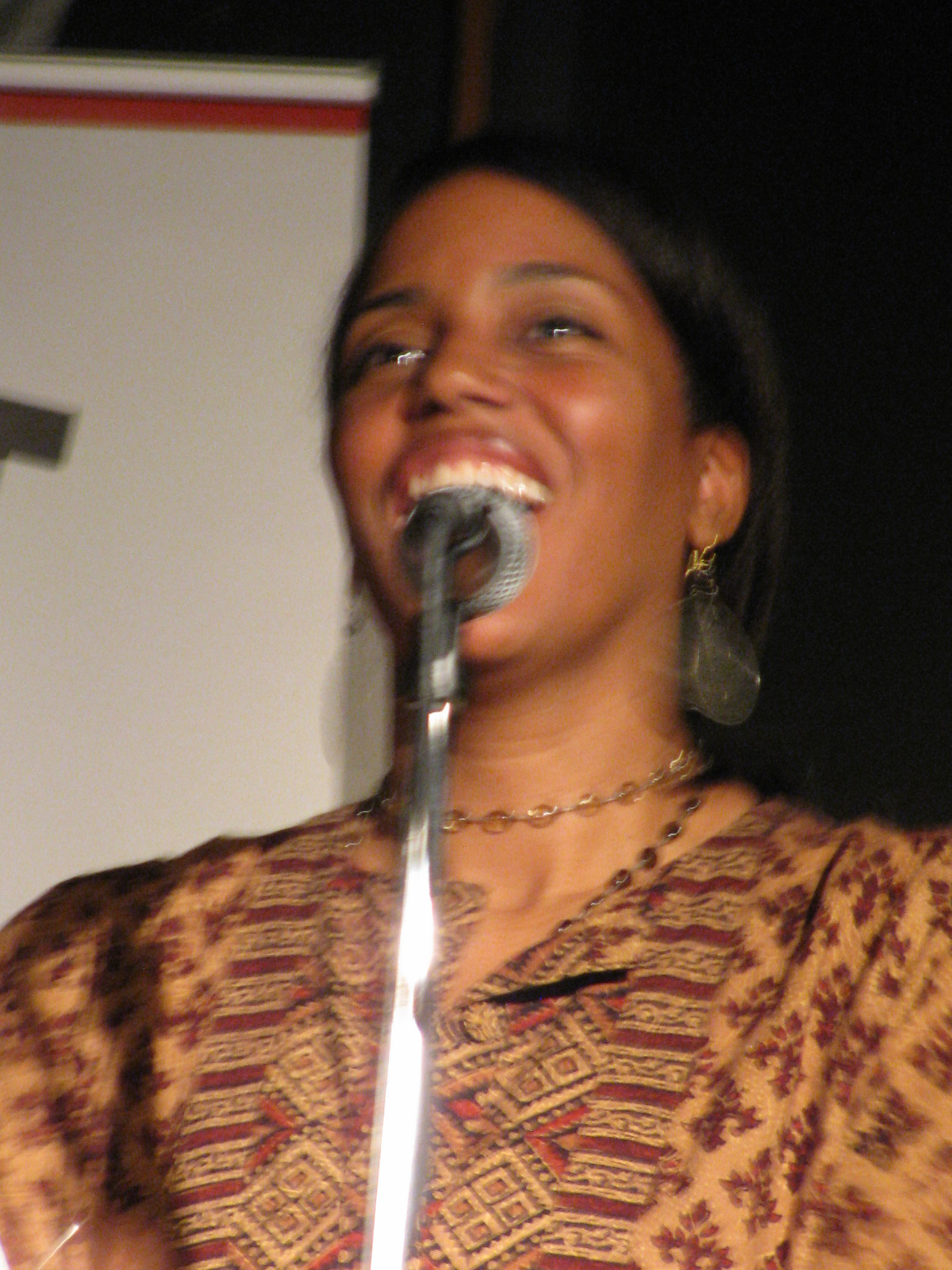
- Ruth Forman, at Sunday Kind of Love, 2013
- Education: University of California, Berkeley; University of Southern California

Ruth Forman is an American poet. Her content focuses on spirituality, love, challenge, and grace. She currently travels around the United States performing readings from her recent publication; Prayers Like Shoes, and her children's book; Young Cornrows Calling Out the Moon.

== Life ==
She graduated from University of California, Berkeley, and University of Southern California film school.

She lives in Washington DC.

== Awards ==
- 2001 Durfee Artist Fellowship to continue work on Mama John, her first novel
- 1999 Pen Oakland Josephine Miles Award for Poetry.
- 1992 Barnard Women Poets Prize

== Works ==
=== Poetry ===
- "Poetry Should Ride the Bus", David Knecht
- Prayers Like Shoes. Whit Press. 2009. ISBN 978-0-9720205-8-9.
- Renaissance. Beacon Press. 1998. ISBN 978-0-8070-6840-3.
- We Are the Young Magicians. Beacon Press. 1993. ISBN 978-0-8070-6820-5.

=== Juvenile ===
- Ruth Forman; Cbabi Bayoc (illustrations) (2007). Young Cornrows Callin Out the Moon. Children's Book Press. ISBN 978-0-89239-218-6. "Ruth Foreman poet."

=== Anthologies ===
- Kalamu ya Salaam, ed. (1998). 360, a revolution of Black poets. Black Words. ISBN 978-0-7394-1585-6.
- Gerald Costanzo; Jim Daniels, eds. (2000). American poetry: the next generation. Carnegie Mellon University Press. ISBN 978-0-88748-343-1.
- Norman Minnick, ed. (2010). Between Water and Song:New Poets for the Twenty-First Century. White Pine Press. ISBN 978-1-935210-07-8.
