= Cathy Park Hong =

American writer

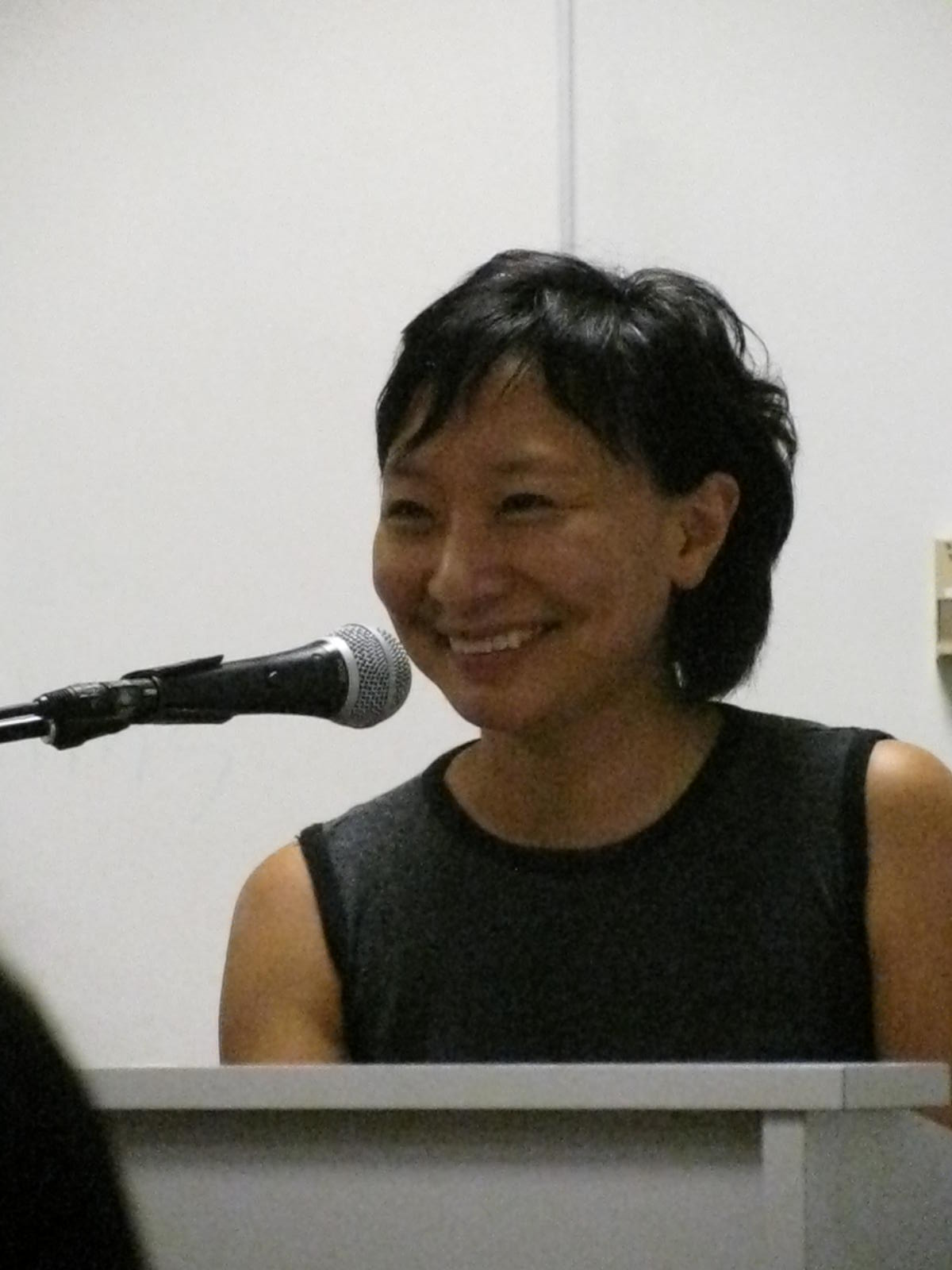
- Born: Los Angeles, California, United States
- Education: Oberlin College (BA); University of Iowa (MFA)
- Occupation: Poet
- Writing career
- Notable works: Dance Dance Revolution; Minor Feelings: An Asian American Reckoning

Cathy Park Hong is a Korean American poet, writer, and professor who has published three volumes of poetry. Much of her work includes mixed language and serialized narrative. She was named on the 2021 Time 100 list for her writings and advocacy for Asian American women.

== Life ==
Hong, a child of Korean parents, was born and raised in Los Angeles, California. She graduated from Oberlin College and has an MFA from Iowa Writers' Workshop.

She taught creative writing at Sarah Lawrence College, Rutgers University, and UC Berkeley, and was previously poetry editor for The New Republic.

== Work ==
Hong is, according to J.P. Eburne's summary of her poetic approach, "dedicated to expanding and experimenting with the capacities of a living art. Her writing, editing, and performances across media seek to open up the 'interactive possibilities' of poetry for the sake of providing 'alternative ways of living within the existing real', as she puts it. 'What are ways in which the poetic praxis can be a ritual for social experimentation? The poem as a public encounter is entrenched in habit. How many ways can we change this encounter?'"

Hong's books of poems include Translating Mo'um (2002), Dance Dance Revolution (2007), and Engine Empire (2012). Her poems have appeared in A Public Space, Paris Review, Poetry, Web Conjunctions, jubilat, and Chain, among others. She has also written articles for publications like The Village Voice, The Guardian, The Christian Science Monitor and The New York Times Magazine. In 2002, she won a Pushcart Prize for Translating Mo'um and she won the 2006 Barnard Women Poets Prize.

She was named on the 2021 Time 100 list for her writings and advocacy for Asian American women.

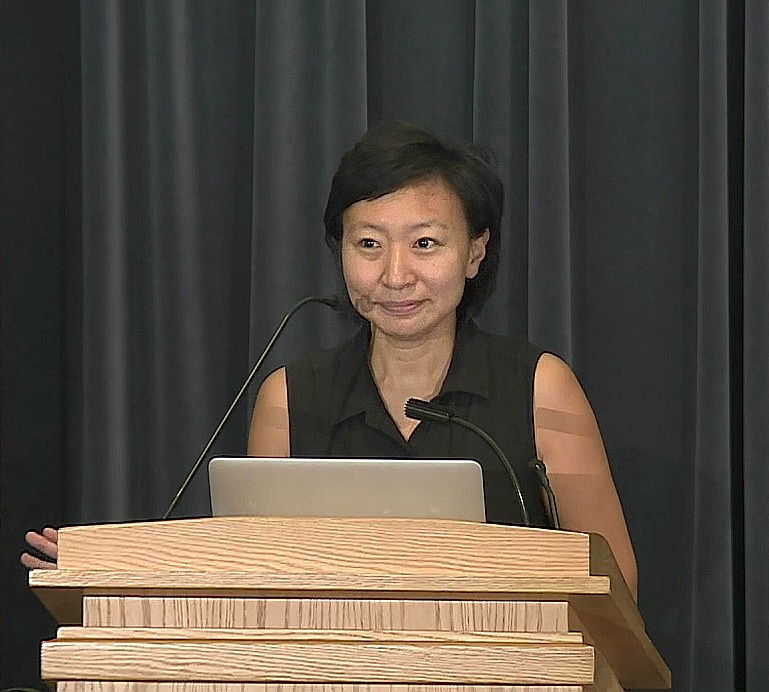
Cathy Park Hong at the Library of Congress in 2016.

=== Dance Dance Revolution ===
Dance Dance Revolution was Hong's second book, published in 2007 by W.W. Norton. It is a collection of poems, written in a style that encompasses "code-switching", or the mixture of several languages, such as English, Spanish, French and Korean, and spoken informally with the inclusion of slang. The story takes place in an imaginary place called "The Desert", a luxurious place where people of different origins and languages mingle, causing a blend of languages that form into a dialect known in the book as "Desert Creole".

The narrator of Dance Dance Revolution is the Historian, who travels to the Desert to find the woman who her father once loved. "The Guide", a character in the story who acts as the tour guide to the Historian, is that woman. Most of the poems in the book are told from The Guide's point of view, characterized by the Guide's mixture of languages and point of view, with narration of the Historian, which is characterized by the Historian's use of standard English. The Guide uses the poems to talk about her life in the Desert as well as her past during the Kwangju Revolution, when she lived in South Korea before she moved to the Desert.

When asked about the unusual language in the book, Hong commented,

As far as the language, I was reading a lot of linguistic theory at the time, particularly on this idea of Creole as a language that is in transition. French, for instance, was a Creole of Latin before it became the "official" language. English is always in transition, although the Standard version is more likely to be frozen in its glass cube. But spoken, English is a busy traffic of dialects, accents, and slang words going in and out of fashion. Slang is especially fascinating. I love outdated slang dictionaries — these words are artifacts that tell you the mindset and squeamish taboos of a certain milieu during a certain time period. I wanted the English in the book to be a hyperbole of that everyday dynamism of spoken English.

=== Minor Feelings: An Asian American Reckoning ===
Minor Feelings: An Asian American Reckoning, published in 2020 by One World, was Hong's first non-fiction book. It can be considered a memoir and autobiographical to a certain extent. Organized around seven essays and addressing different acts of racial discrimination, Minor Feelings uses Hong's life experiences and feelings to demonstrate what it is like living as part of a marginalized community in the capitalist United States of America. The book was a Pulitzer Prize finalist and won the National Book Critics Circle Award for autobiography. In 2021, Greta Lee and A24 were reported to be working on an adaptation of the book.

== Awards ==
- 2002: Pushcart Prize for Translating Mo'Um
- 2006: Barnard Women Poets Prize for Dance Dance Revolution
- 2018: Windham–Campbell Literature Prize in Poetry
- 2020: National Book Critics Circle Award for Autobiography

Other awards include a MacDowell Colony Fellowship, Guggenheim, Fulbright, National Endowment for the Arts Fellowship, and New York Foundation for the Arts Fellowships.

== Bibliography ==
- Translating Mo'um, Hanging Loose Press, 2002, ISBN 9781931236126
- Dance Dance Revolution, W. W. Norton, 2007, ISBN 9780393064841
- Engine Empire: Poems, W. W. Norton & Company, 2012, ISBN 9780393082845
- Minor Feelings: An Asian American Reckoning, One World, 2020 ISBN 9781984820365

=== Essays ===
- "Delusions of Whiteness in the Avant-Garde"
