= Sharan Strange =

American poet (born 1959)

- Born: 1959 (age 66–67)
- Education: Harvard College; Sarah Lawrence College (MFA)
- Occupations: Poet; activist; professor
- Writing career
- Notable awards: Barnard Women Poets Prize (2000); Rona Jaffe Foundation Writers' Award (2004)

Sharan Strange (born 1959) is an African-American poet, activist, and professor.

== Life ==
She grew up in Orangeburg, South Carolina. She was educated at Harvard College, and received an MFA in Poetry from Sarah Lawrence College.

She served as a contributing and advisory editor of Callaloo, and co-founder of the Dark Room Collective (1988-1998) and co-curator of the Dark Room Reading Series. The Dark Room Collective had a mission of forming a community of new African-American writers. Strange has said: "It was the sustaining practice of writing in community just as much as the activism of building a community-based reading series for writers of color that kept us engaged in collectivity."

Strange has been a writer-in-residence at Fisk University, Spelman College, Wheaton College, the University of North Carolina-Wilmington, the University of California, Davis, California Institute of the Arts, and Georgia Institute of Technology. She currently teaches writing at Spelman College.

Her work has appeared in journals such as Callaloo, The American Poetry Review, Painted Bride Quarterly, Beltway Poetry Quarterly, Agenda, AGNI, Mosaic, and L-I-N-K-E-D, and in numerous anthologies.

== Awards ==
- 1998 D.C. Commission on the Arts and Humanities Artist Award
- 2000 Barnard Women Poets Prize, for Ash, selected by Sonia Sanchez
- 2004 Rona Jaffe Foundation Writers' Award
- 2009 Pushcart Prize nomination

== Works ==
- "CHILDHOOD; STREETCORNER CHURCH; WORDS DURING WAR; THE FACTORY; SEDUCTION; ASH". Beltway Poetry Quarterly. 3 (1). Winter 2002.
- "In Praise of the Young and Black"; "Their Voices Drawing Her", L-I-N-K-E-D:The Online Journal
- "Unforgettable", Poet's Moment, NPR
- "Hunger", AGNI 56, 2002
- Ash. Beacon Press. 2001. ISBN 978-0-8070-6863-2.

=== Anthologies ===
Including:

- Nagueyalti Warren, ed. (2008). Temba Tupu! Africana Women's Poetic Self-Portrait. Africa World Press. ISBN 978-1-59221-240-8.
- Nikky Finney, ed. (2007). The Ringing Ear: Black Poets Lean South. University of Georgia Press. ISBN 978-0-8203-2926-0.
- Clarence Major, ed. (1996). The Garden Thrives: Twentieth-Century African American Poetry. Harper Perennial. ISBN 978-0-06-055364-7.
- A. R. Ammons, ed. (1994). The Best American Poetry. Scribners. ISBN 0-671-51004-5.
- Kevin Powell; Ras Baraka, eds. (1992). In the Tradition: An Anthology of Young Black Writers. Writers & Readers Publishing. ISBN 978-0-86316-316-6.
