= Dance Dance Revolution (book) =

2007 book of poems by Cathy Park Hong

- Author: Cathy Park Hong
- Language: English
- Genre: Poetry
- Published: 2007
- Publisher: W. W. Norton & Company
- ISBN: 9780393064841
- OCLC: 797578286

Dance Dance Revolution is a 2007 book of poems by American author Cathy Park Hong. The poems are transcriptions of interviews conducted by the narrator, only referred to as the Historian, of her tour guide in the fictional city called, the Desert. In the year 2016, when the Historian visits the Guide, the Desert is a place of constant movement; with people from all over the world flowing in and out of the Desert every second of the day, its language consists of words from over 300 different languages and dialects with nothing ever at rest. As a result, the Guide's speech is full of words from different languages, mostly, English (slang), Korean, Spanish, and Latin.

The Guide helps the Historian travel through the streets and the hotel in the Desert, all the while voicing her somewhat blunt and bitter opinions on the city. However, as they wander around, the Guide begins to digress from the topic of the Desert to her own childhood in South Korea. Much of the Guide's experiences refer back to the Gwangju Democratization Movement, a violently suppressed uprising that occurred in May 1980 in Gwangju, South Korea against President Chun Doo-hwan; and the life after the movement. Readers find out that the Guide was a South Korean dissident and together with her lover, Sah, aided the uprising.

Between sections of the poems, the narrator also inserts excerpts from her imaginary memoir, which mostly discuss her childhood with her father. These excerpts are in Standard English and provide relief from the complicated language of the Guide. The fragments of her history that she includes usually parallel the stages of the Guide's history, making the book feel more like one whole story, instead of two stories about two different characters.

== Title ==
The book shares its title with the popular video game Dance Dance Revolution. Hong explained in an interview,

I kept coming back to the broader concepts of the game, its phrasing, and realized the title was an appropriate fit for the narrative I was creating for my new collection. I was fascinated by the origin of the game—by the fact that the Japanese appropriated Western dance moves to turn into a video game, a game which was then imported back to the West with explosive success. I loved the cultural zigzagging, which seemed appropriate since the book has much of that misplaced cultural bartering happening in the imagined city. I was also thinking the dynamism of the game and the title’s double-verb etymology related back to the dynamism I was attempting to create in the book's language and world. I could go on and on, but to put it all simply, I stole the title of the game because there is a revolution in the book. And there is dancing.

== Themes ==
Destruction and Renewal

The themes of destruction and renewal add both an eerie foreshadowing and glimmer of hope. Chapter IV: Visions of Pamphlet Gods contains most of the prophecies that tie into the destruction of St. Petersburg. The Guide's childhood friend, Sah, has visions that are used by the author to elaborate upon the story of St. Petersburg. The chapter begins with the descriptions of the idealism behind St. Petersburg, "putti pink visionaries o lambs mewling... visionaries stolen right outta pamphlet pics from Oaklie missionary tub thumpas" The actualization of those ideals never occurs as attempting to create a city full of the best of everything will always result in the same way as the tide pool analogy, "Mine greedy fingas pry dim all off, dump en mine bucket... Two days hence, wadder in mine bucket ink rancid black... allim die..." The eventual downfall of St. Petersburg is to occur as "a shade swallowing the whole city en blood, a rica o carnage" This references the slaughter that occurred as is alluded to by the guide in Services, "Blood rust has been Windexed to amber shine, insurrecta's maurading soul wetted into papa-machetes..." The massacre does not change the eventual paths of time and from the broken leftovers the people move on Chapter IV: Visions of Pamphlet Gods contains most of the prophecies that tie into the destruction of St. Petersburg.

The themes of destruction and renewal are present in the story with more subtle nuances in the author's word choice, but the fact remains that there was a grand slaughter that occurred at the location of the St. Petersburg Hotel and that it was rebuilt full of ideals. The prophecies allude to its eventual destruction, further making the point of a perpetual destruction and rebuilding phase of this location.

Narrators' similarities: Historian and the Guide

The Guide and the Historian have many similarities in their youth. These similarities in their upbringing and fathers creates in intrinsic bond between the two, allowing the Guide's words to flow through the Historian to the reader. The Historian notes that his childhood was spent in quiet isolation from the waves of the world caused by the revolution that was ongoing and it could be inferred that his father was not truly present during his early childhood. The Guide was born in the midst of revolution while her father hid at home away from the reality of the world. Their later years involve moving to a new location from their hometowns and being influenced by new and radical ideas. Additionally both of their fathers are obsessed with dental hygiene, which is a symbol for appearance. The Historian's father is ashamed of his teeth as he is constantly reminded of what lies below his clean, white exterior. The Guide's father also strongly urges his daughter to take care of her teeth so that she may attract men to marry her, fixating on her appearance. The similarities in upbringing and parental figure suggest that the Historian is very well suited to convey the thoughts of the Guide. This, coupled with the ambiguous narrator of many of the poems, unifies the book and forms a strain of coherence among all the chaos of the languages and events.

== Awards ==
Cathy Park Hong won the Barnard Women Poets Prize for Dance Dance Revolution.
