= Dark Room Collective =

African-American poetry collective

The Dark Room Collective was an influential African-American poetry collective. Established in 1988, the collective hosted a reading series that featured leading figures in Black literature.

== Founding and activities ==
After attending the funeral of literary icon James Baldwin in 1987, poets Sharan Strange and Thomas Sayers Ellis, then Harvard undergraduates, with poet-composer Janice Lowe, a Berklee College of Music student, co-founded the Dark Room Reading Series in 1988. The series was named for a project called The Dark Room: A Collection of Black Writing, a library containing the works of black authors which was hosted in a former darkroom on the third floor of their Victorian house at 31 Inman Street in Cambridge.

The Dark Room Collective hosted a writing workshop and gatherings of black artists and writers at the house. They were visited by African-American writers including Alice Walker, bell hooks, Toni Cade Bambara, Derek Walcott, Samuel R. Delany, poet Essex Hemphill, Randall Kenan, Terry McMillan, Ntozake Shange, John Edgar Wideman, and Walter Mosley. They hosted a reading series that paired older writers with younger ones. The group was influenced by Rita Dove. Following problems with their landlord, they relocated the reading series to the Institute of Contemporary Art and later to the Boston Playwrights' Theatre.

The series ran through approximately 1998, though a "reunion tour" took place in 2012 and 2013.

== Influence and alumni ==
The Dark Room Collective has been influential in contemporary American and African-American poetry, inspiring the creation of the Cave Canem Foundation and including many alumni who went on to be highly successful. Future United States Poets Laureate Natasha Trethewey and Tracy K. Smith, New Yorker poetry editor Kevin Young, Carl Phillips, Major Jackson, Patrick Sylvain, Tisa Bryant, Danielle Legros Georges, Artress Bethany White, Trasi Johnson, Adisa Beatty, Nehassaiu deGannes, Donia Allen, Della Scott and John Keene were among the members of the collective.

== See also ==
- Black Arts Movement
- Harlem Renaissance
