= Sandra Lim =

American poet

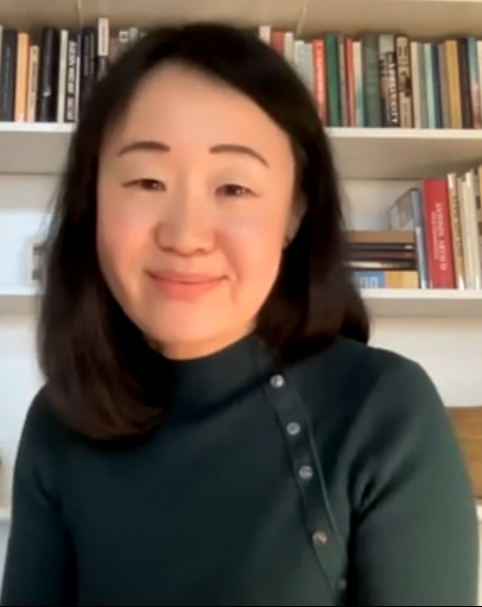
- Lim at UC Berkeley Lunch Poems in 2022
- Born: Seoul, South Korea
- Education: Stanford University; Iowa Writers' Workshop; University of California, Berkeley
- Occupations: Poet; professor
- Writing career
- Notable works: The Wilderness (2014); The Curious Thing (2021)
- Notable awards: Barnard Women Poets Prize (2013); Pushcart Prize; American Academy of Arts and Letters Award in Literature (2020); Guggenheim Fellowship (2021)
- Website: sandralimpoet.com

Sandra Lim is a Korean American poet and professor.

== Early life and education ==
Born in Seoul, Korea, Lim grew up in the San Francisco Bay Area. She earned a BA from Stanford University, an MFA from the Iowa Writers' Workshop, and a PhD in English from University of California, Berkeley.

== Career ==
Lim is Professor of English at University of Massachusetts Lowell in Lowell, Massachusetts where she has taught since 2010. She has taught for The Frost Place, Kundiman, and for the low-residency MFA program at Warren Wilson College.

She is the author of three poetry collections -- The Curious Thing (W.W. Norton, 2021), The Wilderness (W.W. Norton, 2014), and Loveliest Grotesque (Kore Press, 2006). The Wilderness was the winner of the 2013 Barnard Women Poets Prize and the Levis Reading Prize. Her poems have appeared in numerous literary journals and magazines, including The New York Review of Books, Poetry Magazine, and The New Republic. Her poems and essays have been anthologized in Atlantic Currents (Loom Press, 2020), Counterclaims (Dalkey Archive Press, 2020), The Poem's Country (Pleiades Press, 2018), and The Echoing Green (Modern Library, 2016), among others. She serves on the editorial board of Poetry Daily.

Lim received the 2023 Jackson Poetry Prize, an award given by Poets & Writers. Her other honors include fellowships from MacDowell, the Vermont Studio Center, and the Getty Foundation. She is a two-time Pushcart Prize winner and the recipient of a 2020 Award in Literature from the American Academy of Arts and Letters. In 2021, Lim was awarded a Guggenheim Fellowship for her poetry. In 2024 she was named the 2023 UMass Lowell Distinguished University Professor.

== Awards ==
- 2013: Barnard Women Poets Prize
- 2015: Levis Reading Prize
- 2015 and 2022: Pushcart Prize
- 2020: American Academy of Arts and Letters
- 2021: Guggenheim Fellowship in Poetry
- 2023: Jackson Poetry Prize
- 2023: UMass Lowell Distinguished University Professor

== Published works ==
=== Poetry books ===
- Loveliest Grotesque, Kore Press, 2006
- The Wilderness, W.W. Norton, 2014
- The Curious Thing, W.W. Norton, 2021

=== Selected anthologies ===
- Gurlesque: The New Grrly, Grotesque, Burlesque Poetics. Eds. Lara Glenum and Arielle Greenberg. Ardmore, PA: Saturnalia Books, 2010.
- The Echoing Green: Poems of Fields, Meadows, and Grasses. Ed. Cecily Parks. New York: Modern Library, 2016.
- The Poem's Country. Eds. Shara Lessley and Bruce Snider. Warrensburg, Missouri: Pleiades Press, 2018.
- There are Girls Like Lions: Poems about Being a Woman. Foreword by Cole Swenson. San Francisco: Chronicle Books, 2019.
- Atlantic Currents: Cork and Lowell Writers. Eds. Paul Marion and John Wooding. Lowell: Loom Press, 2020.
