= Didi Jackson =

American writer and professor

Didi Jackson (born April 22, 1970) is an American poet and professor. In 2020, she released her debut poetry collection, Moon Jar, and in 2024, she released another titled My Infinity, both with Red Hen Press. She is a professor of creative writing at Vanderbilt University.

== Career ==
She has taught art history courses; she has also taught in the Department of English at the University of Vermont. Since 2021, Jackson has been an assistant professor of creative writing at Vanderbilt University. Jackson has taught "many different levels of students, from high school students to graduate students."

In 2020, Jackson released her debut poetry collection, Moon Jar, with Red Hen Press. Among other experiences, the book's poems involve the suicide of Jackson's husband in 2011. She stated it "was a very difficult book to write, but one that I did so out of necessity. I felt I needed to tell my story."

In 2024, Jackson released a second poetry collection called My Infinity with Red Hen Press. Publishers Weekly particularly noted Jackson's poems in conversation with Hilma af Klint and stated "The question of why haunts this stirring collection, giving voice to the human instinct to seek answers from the dead." The Poetry Foundation said "Jackson finds inspiration in Klint’s daring work, in the power of creativity to bring us back to ourselves, to find wonder in the everyday".

In 2022, Jackson won the Robert H. Winner Memorial Award from the Poetry Society of America for her poem "Two Mule Deer". Jackson's poems have additionally been published in the New Yorker BOMB Magazine, Academy of American Poets, and others.

== Personal life ==
In 2013, she married Major Jackson, another American poet and professor. The same year, they moved to Vermont. She has a son.
