= Barbara Jordan (poet) =

American poet and academic (born 1949)

- Born: 1949 (age 76–77)
- Occupations: Poet, academic
- Employer: University of Rochester
- Known for: Poetry, Academic Work
- Notable work: Tutelary Poems; Channel; Trace Elements
- Awards: 1989 Barnard Women Poets Prize

Barbara Jordan (born 1949) is an American poet and academic. She is a professor of English at University of Rochester, and Plutzik Memorial Series director. Her work has appeared in Paris Review, Sulfur, The Atlantic, The New Yorker, Harvard Review.

== Awards ==
- 1989 Barnard Women Poets Prize

== Works ==
- Tutelary Poems. Radio Cologne.
- Channel. Beacon Press. 1990. ISBN 978-0-8070-6809-0.
- Trace Elements. Penguin Books. 1998.

=== Essays ===
- "Vision as Appetite: Clampitt as Naturalist". Antietam Review. xii. Spring 1992. Archived from the original on October 6, 2008.

== Reviews ==
Barbara Jordan's second collection, while more syntactically scumbled and abstract than her first, proceeds in a similar manner. Like a botanist crossed with a postulant, Jordan maps onto the natural world the disquieted speculations of a religious contemplative. In "Meander," Jordan calls on the renowned Bishop of Hippo to illustrate her method:

"Consciousness as landscape, /
Augustine was mindful of it. `The caverns of memory,' /
he wrote, /
`the mountains and hills of my high imagination.'"

The consciousness that permeates Jordan's landscapes, however, is of a decidedly more modern, Poundian variety.
