= Mary Baine Campbell =

American poet, scholar, and professor

Mary Baine Campbell (born Hudson, Ohio) is an American poet, scholar, and professor. She teaches medieval and Renaissance literature, as well as creative writing, at Brandeis University.

== Awards ==
- 1999 James Russell Lowell Prize, awarded to the best book of the year in literary studies, from the Modern Language Association, for Wonder and Science.
- 2000 Susanne M. Glasscock Humanities Book Award
- 1988 Barnard Women Poets Prize

== Scholarship, research, and creative works ==
- The Witness and the Other World: Exotic European Travel Writing, 400-1600. Cornell University Press. 1991. ISBN 978-0-8014-9933-3.
- Peter Hulme; Tim Youngs, eds. (2002). "Travel writing and its theory". The Cambridge companion to travel writing. Cambridge University Press. p. 261. ISBN 978-0-521-78652-2. "Mary Baine Campbell."
- Wonder & science: imagining worlds in early modern Europe. Cornell University Press. 2004. ISBN 978-0-8014-8918-1.

=== Poetry ===
- The world, the flesh, and angels. Beacon Press. 1989. ISBN 978-0-8070-6806-9.
- Trouble: poems. Carnegie Mellon University Press. 2003. ISBN 978-0-88748-382-0.

=== Editor ===
- Mary B. Campbell; Mark Rollins, eds. (1989). Begetting images: studies in the art and science of symbol production. Peter Lang. ISBN 978-0-8204-1045-6.
