= Lisa Williams (poet) =

American poet (born 1966)

- Born: 1966 (age 59–60); Nashville, Tennessee, U.S.
- Occupation: Poet

Academic background
- Education: Belmont University; University of Virginia; University of Cincinnati

Lisa Williams (born 1966) is an American poet.

== Life ==
She is from Nashville, Tennessee. She graduated from Belmont University, from the University of Virginia, with an M.F.A. and from the University of Cincinnati, with an M.A.

She is an associate professor of English at Centre College. Since 2015, she has served as Series Editor for The University Press of Kentucky New Poetry and Prose Series.

Her work has appeared in The Southwest Review, Poetry, Raritan, The Cincinnati Review, Virginia Quarterly Review, Poetry Daily, and The Hollins Critic.

== Awards ==
- 2007 Barnard Women Poets Prize, for Woman Reading to the Sea, selected by Joyce Carol Oates
- May Swenson Poetry Award, for The Hammered Dulcimer
- 2004 Rome Prize in Literature by the American Academy of Arts and Letters

== Works ==
- Gazelle in the House. New Issues. 2014. ISBN 978-1-936970-24-7.
- Woman Reading to the Sea. W.W. Norton & Co. 2008. ISBN 978-0-393-06643-2.
- The Hammered Dulcimer. Utah State University Press. 1998. ISBN 978-0-87421-249-5.

=== Anthologies ===
- David Lehman, ed. (2008). "On Not Using the Word "Cunt" in a Poem". The Best American Erotic Poems: 1800 to Present. Simon and Schuster. ISBN 978-1-4165-3746-5.
