= Minor Feelings =

2020 autobiographical book by Cathy Park Hong

Minor Feelings: An Asian American Reckoning
- First edition
- Author: Cathy Park Hong
- Language: English
- Genre: Non-fiction / Autobiography
- Publisher: One World, USA
- Publication date: February 25, 2020
- Publication place: United States of America
- Pages: 224
- ISBN: 9781984820365

Minor Feelings: An Asian American Reckoning is a 2020 autobiographical book of essays written by the American author Cathy Park Hong. It was published by Penguin Random House (under its One World imprint) in the United States and Profile Books in the United Kingdom and is composed of seven essays about growing up as an Asian-American in the United States of America. This book won the National Book Critics Circle Award for autobiography in 2020.

Hong defined the title of the book as the emotions felt by marginalized minority groups in a predominantly white society, feelings that are not only disregarded but also considered excessive. The author stated that these feelings of marginalization come from a long history of systemic racism and economic discrimination in society. Although the book is in English, and has yet to be translated, Hong frequently describes Asian-American sentiments with Korean words.

== General theme ==
Throughout the book, Hong uses her own experiences to support her arguments about the feelings of marginalized communities such as: shame, irritation, melancholy, and paranoia. Each of Hong's essays tackles different acts of racial discrimination.

== Summary ==
Minor Feelings is separated into seven essays: "United," "Stand Up," "The End of White Innocence," "Bad English," "An Education," "Portrait of an Artist," and "The Indebted."

=== United ===
Minor Feelings' first essay addresses the racial self, racial awareness, and structural racism. Hong discusses depression, the feeling of Asian-Americans having to prove themselves in a predominantly White society, and the hatred within the Asian-American community itself, leading to separate oneself from the race instead of being supportive of one another. In this essay, Hong examines societal racism towards minority groups within a university.

=== Stand Up ===
Minor Feelings' second essay involves Hong's relationship with poetry, an art form she became interested in at the age of fifteen. Hong states how she became aware of inequalities between Whites and artists of color in the publishing industry. Publishers insist that artists of color write about pain they have experienced because of racism, and books that do not talk about personal racial trauma are not considered worthy of being published. This led Hong to abandon writing and attempt stand-up comedy. She described it as a way to bluntly talk about racism. In Stand Up she also included a discussion about the hatred between the minorities themselves. Hong focused on anti-blackness within the Asian American community, and the racial unfairness showed by the predominantly White society of the United States of America towards black and Brown people compared to Asian-Americans. Hong acknowledged that Asian-Americans are regarded as a model minority in the country, a reference group for other minorities to follow.

=== The End of White Innocence ===
In Minor Feelings' third essay, Hong addresses her childhood experiences growing up as an Asian-American child in a White society and the trauma she endured because of it.

=== Bad English ===
Minor Feelings' fourth essay discusses minority groups' tendencies to not be taught proper English until they are much older (6 to 7 years old) and also addresses Asian-American accents as seen on the media compared to reality. Hong also examines cultural appropriation and how important one's own culture is for minority groups.

=== An Education ===
Minor Feelings' fifth essay talks about female friendships and Hong's education in art school. Hong describes how her friendship with two other Asian-American art students progressed and went through some challenging periods.

=== Portrait of an Artist ===
Minor Feelings' sixth essay critiques the lack of media exposure on murders and assaults of Asian-Americans, specifically women, and discusses Theresa Hak Kyung Cha and her book Dictee.

=== The Indebted ===
Minor Feelings' the seventh and final essay, covered 4 different topics: activism, politics, white supremacy, and the contrasts between living in South Korea and the United States of America.

== Reception ==
Minor Feelings received a starred review from Booklist, as well as positive reviews from The Chicago Review of Books, The Columbia Journal, The Georgia Review, Guernica, Kirkus Reviews, Library Journal, The Los Angeles Review, Los Angeles Review of Books, The Nation, The New York Times, The New Yorker, NPR, and Publishers Weekly.

Booklist's Terry Hong wrote, "Hong creates a fierce amalgamation comprised of careful memoir, radical history, sociopolitical treatise, and revolutionary call-out." Writing for the Los Angeles Review of Books, Cassie Packard said, "Dry and delightfully off-key, Hong’s sense of humor is anchored in self-mockery, if not self-flagellation." Kirkus called Minor Feelings "[a] provocatively incisive debut nonfiction book."

Hyphen's Ananya Kumar-Banerjee provided a mixed review, saying, "I didn’t find Hong’s ruminations on the inconsistency of the Asian American political identity on which 'the paint ... has not dried' particularly revelatory."

Sophia Nguyen, writing for The Washington Post, also offer a mixed review, initially saying, "'Minor Feelings' could serve as a Cliff Notes to Asian American existence for anyone new to the subject (white or otherwise)." However, Nguyen notes that, even when discussing injustices Hong faced, "Her tone is astringent, stripping the memories of any ennobling tragedy or nostalgic fuzz. The anger can’t be prettily plated." Nguyen further noted that while Hong intended to discuss anti-Asian racism, "the book takes up much of its word count discussing others" and eventually, "this tactic seems avoidant."

The New York Times, the New York Public Library, and Esquire named Minor Feelings one of the best books of the year, regardless of genre. TIME, NPR, and Book Riot named Minor Feelings one of the ten best non-fiction books of 2020.

Awards and honors for Minor Feelings
Year	Award/Honor	Result	Ref.
2020	Andrew Carnegie Medal for Excellence in Nonfiction	Longlist	
2020	Booklist's Best Memoirs of the Year	Top 10	
2020	Goodreads Choice Award for Nonfiction	Nominee	
2020	National Book Critics Circle Award for Memoir	Winner	
2020	Reading Women Award for Nonfiction	Nominee	
2021	Pulitzer Prize for General Nonfiction	Finalist	
