= Rebecca Wolff =

American writer (born 1967)

- Born: November 29, 1967; New York City
- Occupation: Poet
- Organization: Fence Magazine
- Awards: 2001 National Poetry Series Award; 2003 Barnard Women Poets Prize

Rebecca Wolff (born November 29, 1967, in New York City) is a poet, fiction writer, and the editor and creator of both Fence Magazine and Fence Books.

Wolff has won the 2001 National Poetry Series Award and 2003 Barnard Women Poets Prize for her literature.

== Life ==
Wolff received her MFA from the Iowa Writers Workshop, where she was a student editor of the Iowa Review.

She created Fence Magazine in 1998, with an editorial staff including Jonathan Lethem, Frances Richard, Caroline Crumpacker, and Matthew Rohrer, and Fence Books in 2001. Fence is now headquartered at the University at Albany, where Wolff is a fellow at the New York State Writers Institute.

She was married from 2002 until 2012 to the novelist Ira Sher. Wolff lives in Hudson, New York, with their children.

On June 25, 2019, Wolff was elected alderman for Hudson's First Ward for the 2020–2021 term.

== Awards ==
- 2001: National Poetry Series for Manderley.
- 2003: Barnard Women Poets Prize for Figment.

== Works ==
- Manderley. University of Illinois Press. November 7, 2001. ISBN 978-0-252-02698-0.
- Figment. W. W. Norton & Company. 2004. ISBN 978-0-393-05918-2.
- The King. W. W. Norton & Company. June 29, 2009. ISBN 978-0-393-06932-7.

=== Anthology ===
- Not for Mothers Only, Contemporary Poems on Child-Getting and Child Rearing, co-edited with Catherine Wagner, was published in 2007.
- Michael Dumanis; Cate Marvin, eds. (2006). Legitimate dangers: American poets of the new century. Sarabande Books. ISBN 978-1-932511-29-1.

=== Novel ===
- The Beginners was published in 2011 by Riverhead Books.

=== Editor ===
- Rebecca Wolff, ed. (2008). A Best of Fence: The First Nine Years. Fence Books. ISBN 978-1-934200-06-3.
