= Fence (magazine) =

Biannual American literary magazine

- Winter 2011 cover
- Editor: Emily Wallis Hughes, Associate Editor Soham Patel, and magazine editors
- Former editors: Rebecca Wolff
- Categories: Literary magazine
- Frequency: Biannual
- Circulation: 3,000 print / 50,000+ digital
- Founded: 1998
- First issue: Spring 1998
- Company: Fence Magazine, Incorporated
- Country: United States
- Based in: Astoria, Queens, New York
- Language: multi-lingual
- Website: fenceportal.org
- ISSN: 1097-9980

Fence is an American print and online literary publication containing both original work and critical and journalistic coverage of what may be largely termed "experimental" or "avant garde" material. Conceived by Rebecca Wolff in 1997 and first printed in Spring 1998 (receiving coverage from Poets & Writers), its editors have included Jonathan Lethem and Ben Marcus (fiction), Matthew Rohrer and Caroline Crumpacker (poetry), and Frances Richard (non-fiction). As of January 1, 2022, poets Emily Wallis Hughes and Jason Zuzga became editorial co-directors.

Fence is published biannually. The translator and National Book Award-nominated poet Cole Swensen edits La Presse, an imprint of Fence magazine publishing contemporary French poetry in translation.

Fence's book publishing arm, Fence Books, has printed volumes by a number of younger non-traditional poets as well as mid-career and older poets. Fence has also joined with McSweeney's, Wave Books and Open City to distribute content at bigsmallpress; it also runs the Constant Critic, an online reviews site. The podcast Fence Sounds is composed of audio adaptations by contributors of their words as published either online or in the print magazine. Fence Magazine, Inc. is an independent not-for-profit based in Astoria, Queens, New York City, publishing Fence as well as Fence Books.

== See also ==
- List of literary magazines
