= Danielle Legros Georges =

Haitian-American poet, essayist and academic (1964–2025)

- Born: February 14, 1964; Gonaïves, Haiti
- Died: February 11, 2025 (aged 60); Dorchester, Boston, Massachusetts, U.S.
- Education: Emerson College; New York University
- Occupations: Poet, essayist and academic
- Known for: Poet laureate of Boston, 2015–2019

Danielle Legros Georges (February 14, 1964 – February 11, 2025) was a Haitian-born American poet, translator, essayist, and academic. She was a professor of creative writing in the Lesley University MFA Program in Creative Writing. Her areas of focus included contemporary American poetry, African-American poetry, Caribbean literature and studies, literary translation, and the arts in education. She was the creative editor of sx salon, a digital forum for innovative critical and creative explorations of Caribbean literature. Legros Georges was poet laureate of Boston, Massachusetts, from 2015 to 2019.

== Life and career ==
Danielle Legros Georges was born in Gonaïves, Haiti. Her family lived in the Democratic Republic of the Congo before settling in Boston, Massachusetts. She had lived and worked in Chicago and New York.

After graduating from Emerson College with a bachelor's degree in Communication Studies, she became part of the Dark Room Collective of Black writers, and went on to earn a master's of fine arts degree in English and creative writing from New York University. As Ira Mathur observes, Legros Georges had "an enduring commitment to the arts, but also to the notion of art as a vehicle for social engagement and healing. It was at NYU that she began to seriously engage with poetry, and her work began to reflect her complex engagement with language—both as a means of expression and as a tool for cultural reclamation."

She was a professor in the Creative Arts in Learning Division of Lesley University.

Her poetry appeared in many literary journals – including Agni, The Boston Globe, Transition, World Literature Today, SpoKe, SX Salon, The Caribbean Writer, Callaloo, Salamander, Poiesis, Black Renaissance Noire, MaComère, and The American Poetry Review – and has been widely anthologised, including in New Daughters of Africa (edited by Margaret Busby, 2019).

Legros Georges's debut book of poems, Maroon, was published in 2001 by Curbstone Press / Northwestern University Press. Her second poetry collection, The Dear Remote Nearness of You (Barrow Street Press, 2016), won the New England Poetry Club's Sheila Margaret Motton Book Prize. Her last collection, Three Leaves, Three Roots: Poems on the Haiti–Congo Story, was published by Beacon Press in January 2025.

In 2014, she was chosen as Boston's poet laureate, the second person to hold the position since the first appointee, Sam Cornish, in 2008. In this ceremonial role, she was tasked with raising the status of poetry in the everyday consciousness of Bostonians, acting as an advocate for poetry, language and the arts, and creating a unique artistic legacy through public readings and civic events. In her role as laureate, she established visiting hours for Bostonians interested in discussions of poetry in branches of the Boston Public Library; created a senior writing workshop for residents of the Mount Pleasant Home and elders of the area community; visited area schools; wrote occasional poems for civic events including the Mayor's State of the City addresses of 2015 and 2016, and the re-opening of the Boston Public Library's Central Branch; and collaborated with poets and poetry organizations in public art projects. As the city laureate, Legros Georges collaborated with Boston-area museums, libraries, artists and students; and represented Boston internationally at literary festivals. In a 2016 interview, she said: "I work on reflecting the vibrancy and life of the city of Boston, my commitment is to the community, and the city's diversity." Her term of office as laureate ran from 2015 to 2019.

Legros Georges died at home in Dorchester, Boston, on February 11, 2025, at the age of 60.

== Awards ==
Awards and accolades include:

- 2012: Massachusetts Cultural Council Finalist in Poetry
- 2013: Black Metropolis Research Consortium Fellowship/Andrew W. Mellon Grant
- 2014, 2015, 2016, 2018, 2019, 2020, 2021: Pushcart Prize Nominations
- 2014: Massachusetts Cultural Council Artist Fellowship in Poetry
- 2015: Brother Thomas Artist Fellowship, The Boston Foundation
- 2016: Honorary Degree of Doctor of Humane Letters, Emerson College
- 2016: Sheila Margaret Motton Book Prize for The Dear Remote Nearness of You, New England Poetry Club
- 2017: Champion of Artists Award, Massachusetts Artists Leaders Coalition
- 2017: The 1804 List of Haitian-American Changemakers in the United States, The Haitian Roundtable
- 2022: PEN/Heim Translation Grant
- 2022: MASS MoCA (Massachusetts Museum of Contemporary Art) Fellowship
- 2022: Massachusetts Cultural Council Artist Fellowship in Poetry

== Bibliography ==
- Maroon (Curbstone Press, 2001)
- The Dear Remote Nearness of You (Barrow Street, 2016)
- Letters From Congo (a chapbook) (Central Square Press, 2017)
- City of Notions: An Anthology of Contemporary Boston Poems (Boston Mayor's Office of Arts and Culture, 2017)
- Island Heart: The Poems of Ida Faubert (translations) (Subpress Books, 2021)
- Wheatley at 250: Black Women Poets Re-Imagine the Verse of Phillis Wheatley Peters (Pangyrus Press, 2023)
- Blue Flare: Three Haitian Poets: Évelyne Trouillot, Marie-Celie Agnant, Maggy de Coster (translations) (Zephre Press, 2024)
- Three Leaves, Three Roots: Poems on the Haiti–Congo Story (Beacon Press, 2025, ISBN 978-080702048-7)
