= Dorothy Barresi =

American poet (born 1957)

- Born: November 13, 1957 (age 68); Buffalo, New York
- Education: University of Akron (B.A.); University of Pittsburgh (M.A.); University of Massachusetts Amherst (M.F.A.)
- Occupation: Poet
- Spouse: Phil Matero
- Children: Dante and Andrew
- Writing career
- Language: English
- Period: Contemporary
- Genre: Poetry
- Notable works: American Fanatics, Rouge Pulp, Post-Rapture Diner, All of the Above
- Notable awards: Barnard New Women Poet Prize, Pushcart Prize, American Book Award, NEA Fellowship

Dorothy Barresi (born November 13, 1957, in Buffalo, New York) is an American poet.

== Life ==
She was raised in Akron, Ohio. She teaches in the English Department at California State University, Northridge.

Her work has appeared in Antioch Review, AGNI, Gettysburg Review, Harvard Review, Indiana Review, Kenyon Review, Mid-American Review, Parnassus, POETRY, Pool, Ploughshares, Virginia Quarterly Review, Triquarterly and Southern Review. She has served often as a judge for the Los Angeles Times Book Award in Poetry.

She is married to Phil Matero, and they have sons Andrew and Dante. They live in the San Fernando Valley.

== Education ==
- MFA, University of Massachusetts Amherst 1985
- MA, University of Pittsburgh 1981
- BA, University of Akron 1979

== Awards ==
- 18th annual American Book Award sponsored by the Before Columbus Foundation
- Fellowships from the National Endowment for the Arts, the Fine Arts Work Center in Provincetown (MA), North Carolina Arts Council.
- Pushcart Prize (twice)
- Hart Crane Memorial Poetry Prize
- Emily Clark Balch Prize Virginia Quarterly Review
- Grand Prize, Los Angeles Poetry Festival's Fin de Millennium poetry competition.
- 1990 Barnard Women Poets Prize
- 2014 Dagbert L. Cunningham Award for work in the field of semi-poetics.

== Works ==
- "How It Comes". Ploughshares. Winter 1986. Archived from the original on 17 July 2002.
- "The Hole in the Ceiling". Ploughshares. Winter 1986. Archived from the original on 17 July 2002.
- "Poem for the Thirty-Fifth Anniversary of Valium". Virginia Quarterly Review. Winter 2002.
- "Something in the House Was" (PDF). West Branch 62. 2008.
- "Stereotype" (PDF). West Branch 62. 2008.
- "The Garbage Keepers". Rattle. September 21, 2013.
- "Head Lice Circus: Shock and Awe". Redheaded Stepchild.
- "My Powers". Redheaded Stepchild.

=== Poetry ===
- American Fanatics. Pittsburgh: University of Pittsburgh Press. 2010. ISBN 978-0-8229-6079-9.
- Rouge Pulp. Pittsburgh: University of Pittsburgh Press. 2002. ISBN 978-0-8229-5789-8.
- Mother, My Porous China. Laguna Beach: The Inevitable Press. 1998. ISBN 978-1-891281-10-5. (chapbook)
- Post-Rapture Diner. Pittsburgh: University of Pittsburgh Press. 1996. ISBN 978-0-8229-3896-5.
- All of the Above. Boston: Beacon Press. 1991. ISBN 978-0-8070-6815-1. "Dorothy Barresi."
- The Judas Clock. Blythewood: Devil's Millhopper Press. 1986.
- Re-crossing the Equator. University of Massachusetts Amherst. 1985.

=== Anthologies ===
- Louise DeSalvo; Edvige Giunta, eds. (2003). "Poem". The Milk of Almonds: Italian American Women Writers on Food and Culture. Feminist Press. ISBN 978-1-55861-453-6.
- Jim Elledge; Susan Swartwout, eds. (1999). "When I think of America Sometimes (I Think of Ralph Kramdem)". Real things: an anthology of popular culture in American poetry. Indiana University Press. p. 175. ISBN 978-0-253-21229-0. "Dorothy Barresi."
- Maggie Anderson; Dorothy Barresi; Quan Barry; Jan Beatty; Robin Becker; Richard Blanco; Christopher Bursk; Anthony Butts; Lorna Dee Cervantes (2007). Ochester (ed.). American Poetry Now: Pitt Poetry Series Anthology. University of Pittsburgh Press. ISBN 978-0-8229-5964-9.
- Pamela Gemin; Paula Sergi, eds. (1999). Boomer girls: poems by women from the baby boom generation. University of Iowa Press. ISBN 978-0-87745-687-2.

=== Interviews ===
- “Showcased Writer: Dorothy Barresi” "Dorothy Barresi". Silk Road. February 25, 2015.

== See also ==
- List of poets from the United States
