= Claire Wahmanholm =

American poet

- Education: University of Wisconsin-Madison (BA); Johns Hopkins University (MFA); University of Utah (PhD)

Claire Wahmanholm is an American poet.

Wahmanholm received a BA from University of Wisconsin-Madison, an MFA from the Writing Seminars at Johns Hopkins University and a PhD from the University of Utah. She lives in Saint Paul, Minnesota.

Her poems have appeared in Academy of American Poets Poem-a-Day series, The Cincinnati Review, The Hopkins Review, Poetry Daily, and TriQuarterly. Her debut poetry collection Wilder (Milkweed Editions, 2018) won the 2018 Lindquist & Vennum Prize for Poetry and the 2018 Society of Midland Authors Award, and was a finalist for the 2019 Minnesota Book Award. Her second book was Redmouth (Tinderbox Editions, 2019). Her most recent book, Meltwater (Milkweed Editions, 2023), was a finalist for the 2024 Minnesota Book Award and the 2024 Kingsley Tufts Poetry Award, and was a 2025 National Book Foundation Science + Literature selection. Her poem "Glacier" was the winner of the 2022 Montreal International Poetry Prize. She was a 2021 McKnight Artist Fellow.

== Bibliography ==
=== Poetry collections ===
- Night Vision. New Michigan Press. December 11, 2017. ISBN 9781934832622.
- Wilder. Milkweed Editions. November 13, 2018. ISBN 9781571315069.
- Redmouth. Tinderbox Editions. October 29, 2019. ISBN 9781943981144.
- Meltwater. Milkweed Editions. March 14, 2023. ISBN 9781639551019.

=== Selected anthology appearances ===
- Christopher Kondrich; Lucy Spelman; Susan Tacent, eds. (January 21, 2025). Creature Needs: Writers Respond to the Science of Animal Conservation. University of Minnesota Press. ISBN 9781517918316.
- Luisa A. Igloria; Aileen Cassinetto; Jeremy S. Hoffman, eds. (September 15, 2023). Dear Human at the Edge of Time. Paloma Press. ISBN 9781734496543.
- Lisa Fay Coutley, ed. (February 16, 2024). In The Tempered Dark: Contemporary Poets Transcending Elegy. Black Lawrence Press. ISBN 9781625570666.

=== Poems ===
- "About Suffering". High Country News. September 1, 2024.
- "Glacier". Montreal International Poetry Prize (2023).
- "Sounds Like Rain". TriQuarterly. 2023.
- "O". Academy of American Poets Poem-a-Day. May 2, 2020.
- "Nocturne". Cincinnati Review. 2019.
