= Barnard Women Poets Prize =

The Barnard Women Poets Prize is a literary award in the United States for an English language book of poetry. From 1986 to 2001, the prize was a first-book award called the Barnard New Women Poets Prize. Winners had their poetry book published under the auspices of the award, and 16 were published from 1986 to 2001 with support from the Axe-Houghton Foundation and alumnae of Barnard College. Beacon Press was the publisher.

A 2000 essay in the Chicago Review named this prize as one of two examples (along with the Yale Series of Younger Poets) of "first-book awards of notable integrity".

In 2003, Women Poets at Barnard, in collaboration with W.W. Norton, inaugurated a new biennial book prize for the best second book by an American woman poet, expressing the view that "a second book more firmly establishes a poet". It is awarded by Women Poets at Barnard and the publisher W.W. Norton & Company and includes publication of the poetry book and a free public poetry reading by the author at Barnard.

== Winners and judges ==
Year	Winner	Book	Judge
2016	Brittany Perham	Double Portrait	Claudia Rankine
2013	Sandra Lim	The Wilderness	Louise Glück
2011	Traci Brimhall	Our Lady of the Ruins	Carolyn Forché
2009	Sandra Beasley	I Was the Jukebox	Joy Harjo
2007	Lisa Williams	Woman Reading to the Sea	Joyce Carol Oates
2006	Cathy Park Hong	Dance Dance Revolution	Adrienne Rich
2005	Julie Sheehan	Orient Point	Billy Collins
2004	Tessa Rumsey	The Return Message	
2003	Rebecca Wolff	Figment	
2001	Lise Goett	Waiting for the Paraclete	
2000	Sharan Strange	Ash	Sonia Sanchez
1999	Christine Hume	Musica Domestica	Heather McHugh
1998	Jenna Osman	The Character	Lyn Hejinian
1997	Larissa Szporluk	Dark Sky Question	Brenda Hillman
1996	Harriet Levin	The Christmas Show	Eavan Boland
1995	Reetika Vazirani	White Elephants	Marilyn Hacker
1994	Joyce Sutphen	Straight Out of View	
1993	Donna Masini	That Kind of Danger	Mona Van Duyn
1992	Ruth Foreman	We Are the Young Magicians	Cherrie Maraga
1991	Frances McCue	The Stenographer's Breakfast	Colleen J. McElroy
1990	Dorothy Barresi	All of the Above	Olga Broumas
1989	Barbara Jordan	Channel	Molly Peacock
1988	Mary B. Campbell	The World, The Flesh, and angels	Carolyn Forché
1987	Elizabeth Socolow	Laughing at Gravity: Conversations with Isaac Newton	Marie Ponsot
1986	Patricia Storace	Heredity	Louise Bernikow
