= Major Jackson =

American poet and professor (born 1968)

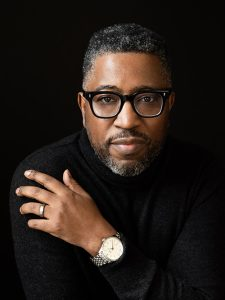
- Born: Philadelphia, Pennsylvania, U.S.
- Education: Temple University; University of Oregon
- Occupation: Poet
- Writing career
- Genre: Poetry
- Movement: Dark Room Collective
- Website: majorjackson.com

Major Jackson (born in Philadelphia, Pennsylvania) is an American poet and professor at Vanderbilt University. He is the author of six collections of poetry: Razzle Dazzle: New & Selected Poems 2002-2022 (W.W. Norton, 2023), The Absurd Man (W.W. Norton, 2020), Roll Deep (W.W. Norton, 2015), Holding Company (W.W. Norton, 2010), Hoops (W.W. Norton, 2006), finalist for an NAACP Image Award for Outstanding Literature-Poetry, and Leaving Saturn (University of Georgia, 2002), winner of the 2000 Cave Canem Poetry Prize and finalist for a National Book Critics Award Circle. His edited volumes include: Best American Poetry 2019, Renga for Obama, and Library of America's Countee Cullen: Collected Poems. His prose is published in A Beat Beyond: Selected Prose of Major Jackson (University of Michigan, 2022). From 2023 to 2025, he served as host of the award-winning podcast The Slowdown.

== Life ==
Major Jackson was born on September 9, 1968, in Philadelphia, Pennsylvania. Jackson attended a studious Catholic primary school and later attended Central High School. He earned degrees from Temple University and the University of Oregon. Jackson married Didi Jackson in May 2013. Major Jackson is the Gertrude Conaway Vanderbilt Chair in the Humanities at Vanderbilt University. From 2002 until 2020, he taught at the University of Vermont as the Richard A. Dennis Professor of English and University Distinguished Professor. He is a former graduate faculty member of the New York University Creative Writing Program and the Bennington Writing Seminars. He serves as the Poetry Editor of The Harvard Review.

His poems and essays have appeared in The American Poetry Review, The New Yorker, The Paris Review, Ploughshares, Poetry London, Orion Magazine, and The Yale Review, among other fine publications. His poetry has received critical attention in The Boston Globe, Christian Science Monitor, The New York Times, World Literature Today, Philadelphia Inquirer, and on National Public Radio's All Things Considered. His work has been included in many anthologies including The Best American Poetry (Scribner), The Pushcart Prize XXIX: Best of the Small Presses, (W.W. Norton & Company) Schwerkraft, From the Fishouse (Persea Books), and The Word Exchange: Anglo-Saxon Poems in Translation (W.W. Norton & Company, 2010). Major Jackson also became the host of The Slowdown, a podcast that selects a poem and reflects on it in a five to ten minute episode.

== Honors and awards ==
A recipient of fellowships from the Fine Arts Work Center in Provincetown, Guggenheim Foundation and National Endowment for the Arts, his awards include a Pushcart Prize, a Whiting Award, a Pew Fellowship in the Arts, and a Witter Bynner Fellowship in conjunction with the Library of Congress. He also served as poet-in-residence at The Frost Place, creative arts fellow at the Radcliffe Institute for Advanced Study at Harvard University, Jack Kerouac Writer-in-Residence at the University of Massachusetts Lowell, and Sidney Harman Writer-in-Residence at Baruch College. In 2025, he received the inaugural Patricia Cannon Willis Prize for American Poetry from Yale University Library for Razzle Dazzle: New and Selected Poems 2002–2022.

== Inspiration and effects ==
In an interview, Jackson expressed an interest in "the ethical obligation we have to the communities we claim," one of the many themes in his "Urban Renewal" series. While at Temple University, Jackson formed a relationship with Sonia Sanchez, his first creative-writing professor, who he claims is "responsible for his embrace of poetry". Other important role models include Garrett Hongo, Derek Walcott, Afaa Michael Weaver, Gwendolyn Brooks, Robert Hayden, Philip Levine and C. K. Williams.

He was a member of the Dark Room Collective.

In many of Jackson's works, he incorporates a theme of praise, as he believes that this praise "affected him most deeply in the works of the earlier generation of African America poets". Jackson went to Kenya with the mission of extending the literary conversation between Kenya and the United States by working with local writers.

== Poetry collections ==
- Razzle Dazzle: New and Selected Poems 2002-2022. W W Norton & Co Inc. 2023. ISBN 978-1-324-06490-9.
- The Absurd Man: Poems. W W Norton & Co Inc. 2020. ISBN 978-1-324-00455-4.
- Roll Deep: Poems. W W Norton & Co Inc. 2015. ISBN 978-0-393-24689-6.
- Holding Company: Poems. W W Norton & Co Inc. 2010. ISBN 978-0-393-07080-4.
- Hoops: Poems. W W Norton & Co Inc. 2006. ISBN 978-0-393-33037-3.
- Leaving Saturn: poems. University of Georgia Press. 2002. ISBN 978-0-8203-2342-8.

== Prose collections ==
- A Beat Beyond: Selected Prose of Major Jackson, ed. Amor Kohli. University of Michigan Press. 2022. ISBN 978-0-472-03906-7.
