= Dore Kiesselbach =

American poet

- Education: University of Iowa; Oberlin College
- Occupation: Poet
- Writing career
- Genre: Poetry

Dore Kiesselbach is an American poet.

== Biography ==
He graduated from Oberlin College in 1988, and the University of Iowa. His work has appeared in Agni, Antioch Review, Field, Poetry, Poetry Review (UK), and other magazines.

He is married to Karin Ciano; they live in Minneapolis.

== Awards ==
- 2014 Robert H. Winner Memorial Award
- 2011 Agnes Lynch Starrett Poetry Prize
- 2009 Bridport Prize

== Works ==
- Albatross, University of Pittsburgh Press (2017)
- Salt Pier, University of Pittsburgh Press (2012)
- "Albatross," a series, Plume
- "Hickey", Poetry Society of America
- "Catafalque", AGNI Online
- "Aubade", American Life in Poetry
- "Crucifixion", Plume
- "Turkey Fallen Dead From Tree", Poetry
- "The Painted Hall, Lascaux", Waywiser Press
