= Blood, Sparrows and Sparrows =

Poetry book by Eugenia Leigh

- Genre: Poetry
- Publisher: Four Ways Books
- Publication date: 2014

Blood, Sparrows and Sparrows is a 2014 book of poetry by the Korean American poet Eugenia Leigh. It was well received, reviewers commenting on its themes of abuse and redemption.

== Context ==
Eugenia Leigh graduated from Sarah Lawrence College. Her poetry has appeared in Drunken boat, Pank, Rattle, The Rumpus, North American Review, and Solstice. She is editor of Hyphen magazine, and has served as the poetry editor of Kartika Review.

== Book ==
=== Publication ===
Blood, Sparrows and Sparrows (2014, Four Way Books, 84 pages, ISBN 978-1-935536-49-9) is Leigh's first book of poetry. It has four sections; each of the first three are entitled "Blood"; the fourth is entitled "Sparrows". There are 41 poems in all. Some have biblical titles, such as "Genesis", "Selah", "Psalm 107", and "Testament". The eponymous poem "Blood, Sparrows and Sparrows" is in section III.

=== Reception ===
The book is described by Kenji Liu in Rumpus as masterful, maintaining freshness despite focusing tightly on a single theme, and powerfully inventive.

The book is reviewed in Portage magazine by Steve Schauz, who writes that the book thrusts the reader "into the violent landscape in which the speaker reflects upon her experiences within an abusive home, and the emotional and spiritual scarring that lingers into the present moment." Schauz states that the collection is made special by the "resilient hope" that is ever-present. He calls it "a collection of struggle, existential crises, spiritual unrest, and violence that is expressed with bold sentimentality and heart-wrenching beauty."

The poet Shaindel Beers, reviewing the book in American Book Review, states that Leigh "writes with shocking compassion towards the abuser", as one who owns up to her own tendency to violence, and understands the cycle of abuse. In this, according to Beers, Leigh's work goes further than many "survivor narratives". The poems that Beers finds "most visceral" are the ones where she asks readers to look at their own defects, as in poems like "Not a Warning, Not a Challenge, Not an Instruction Manual". Beers notes that Leigh frequently mentions bell jars, alluding to Sylvia Plath's 1963 novel The Bell Jar, both indicating the tradition she is following and showing that she is a "trailblazer". Beers writes that while the collection seems autobiographical, Leigh's alternation between the self and the world outside prevents the poems from being "too uncomfortably personal".

The poet Rachel Mennies, reviewing the book in Pank magazine, compares Leigh's use of sisters, father and mother characters to ancient Greek mythology, writing that the figures are built "to the scale of myth throughout".

The poet Sebastian H. Paramo, reviewing Blood, Sparrows and Sparrows in American Microreviews, writes that in the work "readers encounter God, angels, fragments of violence, loss, and redemption." He calls the poems "raw, honest, and unafraid to confront the speaker's flaws and of the characters she encounters." Despite this, Paramo notices the combination of "devastation and resolve", with hope gleaming out from the wreckage. He describes the poems as "brave, and a remarkable debut."

The book is reviewed in Muzzle magazine by the poet Kendra DeColo. She calls it a "searing debut about the trauma of memory", finding the poet's lyricism "refreshingly surreal, mystical, and grounded in the body." The surrealism is, writes DeColo, combined with honest portrayal of the real world.

A poem, "Recognizing Lightning", from the book has been included in Amorak Huey and W. Todd Kaneko's Poetry, A Writer's Guide and Anthology, Bloomsbury, 2018, in the "Ars Poetica" section.

== Honors and distinctions ==
Leigh has won awards and fellowships from Poets & Writers Magazine, Kundiman, Rattle, and The Asian American Literary Review for the book, and was a finalist in The National Poetry Series and Yale Younger Poets. It won her the 2015 Debut-Litzer Award for Poetry.

== Works ==
- Blood, Sparrows and Sparrows, New York, NY : Four Way Books, 2014. ISBN 9781935536499, OCLC 877852025
