= Julie Sheehan =

American poet

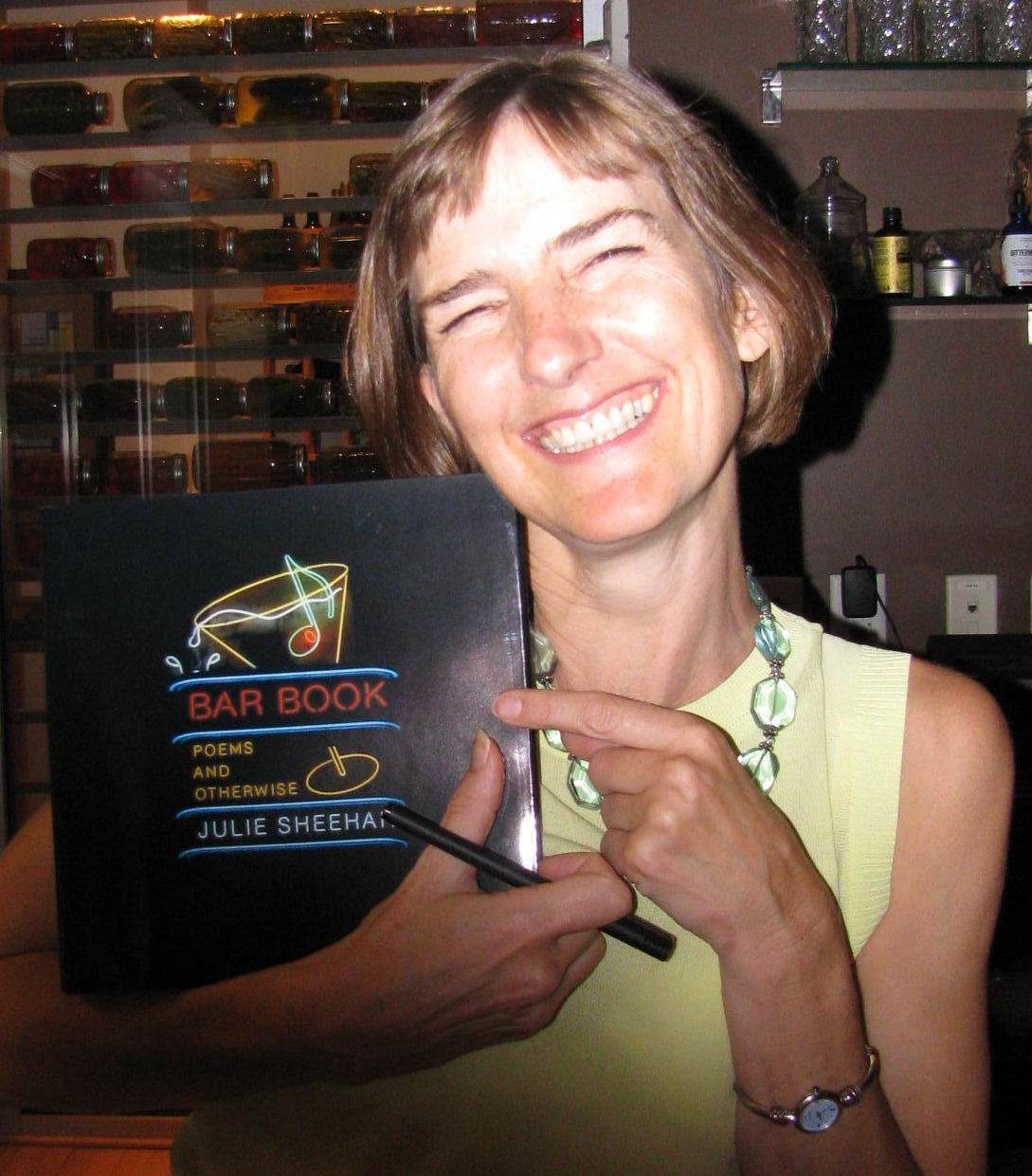
- Julie Sheehan with Bar Book, at PS7, 777 I Street, N.W., Washington, D.C.
- Born: Julie Sheehan; Iowa, U.S.
- Education: Yale University; Columbia University
- Known for: Poetry

Julie Sheehan (born in Iowa) is an American poet.

== Life ==
She graduated from Yale University, and Columbia University.

She lives in Long Island, New York, with her son, and is currently Director of the MFA in Creative Writing & Literature program as well as an assistant professor at Stony Brook Southampton.

Her work has appeared in Ploughshares, Paris Review, Southwest Review, Texas Review and Western Humanities Review.

== Awards ==
- 2009 New York Foundation for the Arts fellowship in poetry
- 2008 Whiting Award
- 2005 Barnard Women Poets Prize
- Bernard F. Conners Prize for Poetry, Paris Review
- Robert H. Winner Memorial Award, Poetry Society of America.
- Poets Out Loud Prize

== Works ==
- "Dependent Clause", Huffington Post
- "Ash Grove of Ash", Drunken boat
- "104°". Ploughshares. Winter 2000. Archived from the original on November 4, 2007.
- Thaw. Fordham Univ Press. 2001. ISBN 978-0-8232-2169-1.
- Orient Point. W.W. Norton & Co. 2007. ISBN 978-0-393-33035-9.
- Bar Book: Poems and Otherwise. W. W. Norton & Company. 2010. ISBN 978-0-393-07217-4.

=== Anthologies ===
- Paul Muldoon; David Lehman, eds. (2008). "Hate Poem". The best American poetry, 2005. Simon and Schuster. ISBN 978-0-7432-5738-1.
