= Patricia Spears Jones =

American poet (born 1951)

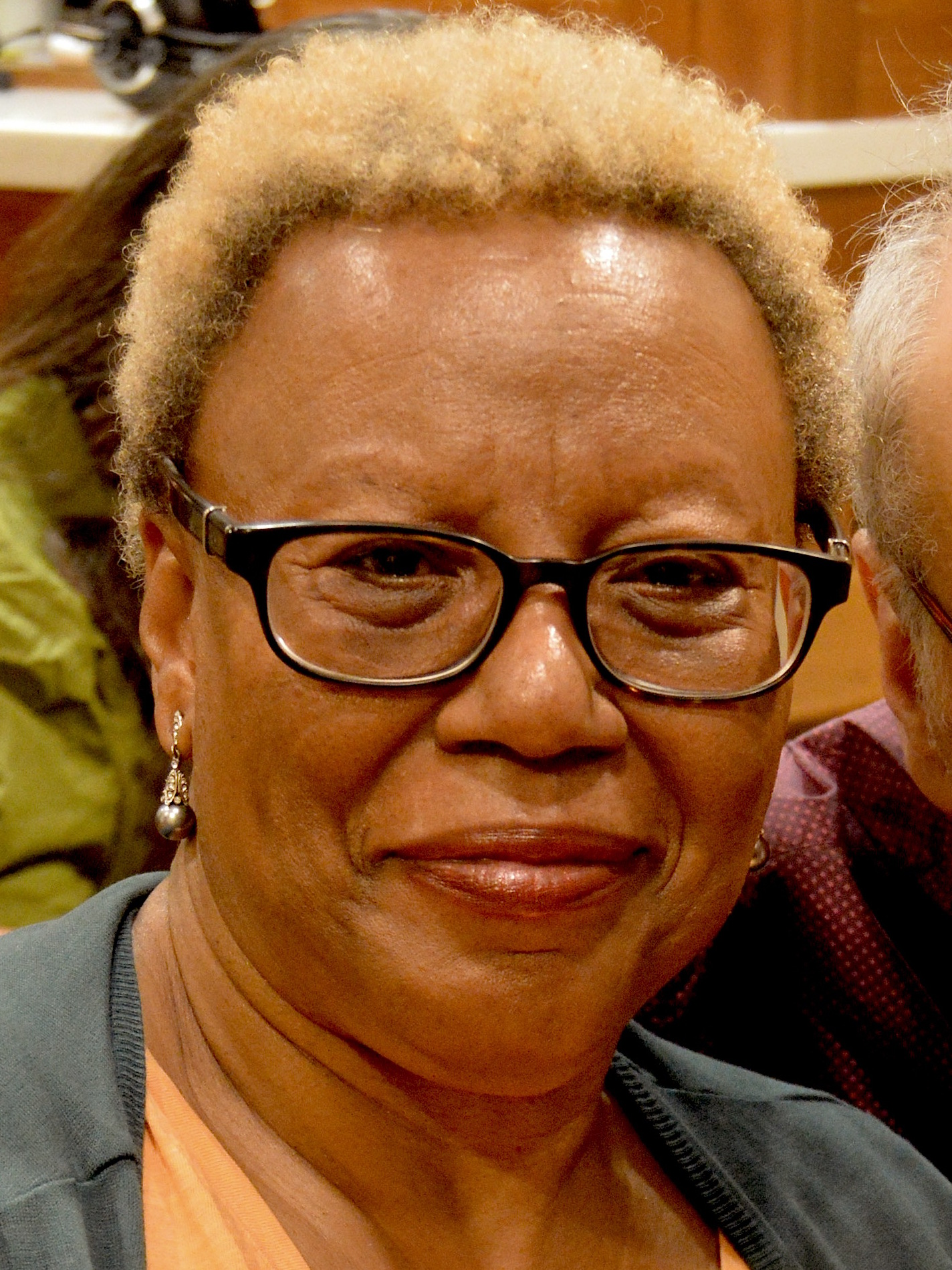
- Jones at the Kelly Writers House in 2016
- Born: 1951 (age 74–75); Forrest City, Arkansas, U.S.
- Education: Rhodes College; Vermont College
- Occupation: Poet
- Awards: Jackson Poetry Prize

Patricia Spears Jones (born 1951) is an American poet. She is the author of five books of poetry. Jones is the editor of "The Future Differently Imagined", an issue of About Place Journal, the online publication of Black Earth Institute. Previously, she was the co-editor for Ordinary Women: Poems of New York City Women. Her poem "Beuys and the Blonde" was nominated for a Pushcart Prize. Jones was the winner of the Jackson Poetry Prize for 2017, and she was the 2020 Louis D. Rubin Jr. Writer-in-Residence at Hollins University.

A native of Forrest City, Arkansas, Jones lives in New York City. She received her BA degree from Rhodes College in 1973, and her MFA from Vermont College in 1992. She has been a constant presence in the New York writing community.

== Bibliography ==
Poetry collections

- A Lucent Fire: New and Selected Poems (White Pine Press, 2015) ISBN 9781935210696
- Living in the Love Economy (Overpass Books, 2014) ISBN 9780983220664
- Painkiller: Poems (Tia Chucha Press, 2010) ISBN 9781882688401
- Femme du Monde (Tia Chucha Press, 2006) ISBN 9781882688319
- The Weather That Kills (Coffee House Press, 1995) ISBN 9781566890298

== Honors and awards ==
- 1994 — National Endowment for the Arts (NEA) Literature Fellowship, recipient
- 1996 — Foundation for Contemporary Arts Grants to Artists award
- 2000 — Featured in The Best American Poetry (edited by Rita Dove)
- 2017 — Jackson Poetry Prize (awarded by Poets & Writers)
- 2018 — Rauschenberg Foundation Resident—Captiva Island, Florida
- 2018 — Her poem "Seraphim" listed in The New Yorker's Years in Poems
- 2026 — Rauschenberg Centennial Award
