= Poets & Writers =

Nonprofit literary organization

- Poets & Writers, Inc.
- Formation: 1970
- Founder: Galen Williams
- Type: Nonprofit organization
- Tax ID no.: 13-2682458
- Legal status: 501(c)(3) organization
- Headquarters: New York City, New York, U.S.
- Executive director: Melissa Ford Gradel
- Website: www.pw.org

Poets & Writers, Inc. is one of the largest nonprofit literary organizations in the United States serving poets, fiction writers, and creative nonfiction writers. The organization publishes a bi-monthly magazine called Poets & Writers Magazine, and is headquartered in New York City.

== History ==
In 1970, the director of New York's famed 92nd Street YM-YWHA Poetry Center, Galen Williams, leveraged seed money from the New York State Council on the Arts to launch a new organization for writers that would provide them with fees for giving readings and teaching workshops. The organization began in an apartment on the fringe of the Theater District. Since that time, Poets & Writers has grown into one of the largest nonprofit organizations in the country for writers of poetry, fiction, and creative nonfiction.

Throughout the 1980s and 1990s, Poets & Writers cultivated new sources of revenue, enabling the organization to expand its programs and publications. Award-winning editorial and design changes elevated Poets & Writers Magazine to new subscription and advertising levels. The organization's Readings/Workshops program was offered in new regions across the country, connecting writers and audiences in California, Chicago and Detroit, in addition to New York State, where the program began. And the Writers Exchange program, which would introduce writers to the New York literary community, was initiated.

In 2006, Poets & Writers successfully completed its first capital campaign, raising $3 million and establishing an endowment to bring the Readings/Workshops program to six new cities: Atlanta, Houston, New Orleans, Seattle, Tucson, and Washington, D.C.

On June 18, 2022, Poets & Writers decided to join the National Coalition Against Censorship because "Efforts to limit readers' access to books are an affront to freedom." On the same day the NCAC welcomed the move.

== Magazine ==
Poets & Writers Magazine
- Frequency: Bi-monthly
- Circulation: 60,000
- Publisher: Poets & Writers
- Company: Poets & Writers
- Country: United States
- Based in: New York City
- Language: English
- Website: pw.org/magazine
- ISSN: 0891-6136

Poets & Writers Magazine is a widely distributed bi-monthly magazine. The publication features literary-based news articles, critical reviews and interviews with prominent authors.

Poets & Writers Magazine also serves as a resource for thousands of writers, with up-to-date information on literary grants and awards, literary magazines, presses, jobs, author directories and literary events. It's been called the "must-have journal for scribes."

Beginning with the May/June 2010 issue, the magazine has been available in digital format.

== Prizes sponsored ==
=== Jackson Poetry Prize ===
The Jackson Poetry Prize, established in 2006, honors an American poet of exceptional talent who has published at least two books of recognized literary merit. Initially offering an award of $50,000, this prize has grown to $100,000. There is no application process for the Jackson Poetry Prize; nominees are identified by a group of poets selected by Poets & Writers who remain anonymous; final selection is made by a panel of poets.

Honorees include the following:

Year	Recipient	Ref.
2007	Elizabeth Alexander	
2008	Tony Hoagland	
2009	Linda Gregg	
2010	Harryette Mullen	
2011	James Richardson	
2012	Henri Cole	
2013	Arthur Sze	
2014	Claudia Rankine	
2015	X. J. Kennedy	
2016	Will Alexander	
2017	Patricia Spears Jones	
2018	John Yau	
2019	Joy Harjo	
2020	Ed Roberson	
2021	Carl Phillips	
2022	Sonia Sanchez	
2023	Sandra Lim	
2024	Fady Joudah	
2025	Cyrus Cassells	

=== The Maureen Egen Writers Exchange Award ===
Initiated in 1984, the Writers Exchange Award provides two emerging writers with an all-expenses-paid trip to New York City where P&W arranges meetings with agents, editors, and prominent authors. The winners' visit culminates in a public reading in Manhattan.

Each year, two writers from one state are invited to submit manuscripts to Poets & Writers. To date, 76 writers from 30 states have received the Writers Exchange Award. Many of the winners have gone on to get their books published, receive other awards, and secure teaching positions.

In 2007, a special grant enabled P&W to offer the Writers Exchange to two writers from California. Two writers from Missouri also received the Writers Exchange Award this year.

In 2008, Writers who live in Tennessee are invited to apply for the 2009 Maureen Egen Writers Exchange Award. Bryn Chancellor was the WEX award winner of 2014. In 2016, the Maureen Egen WEX Award invited Maine writers and poets to apply for the 2017 Award. The 2017 winners were Joan Dempsey and Brian Evans-Jones. In 2019, the award selected writers from Oklahoma to admit their works, with a different state selected for different years. At the time, 40 states and Washington DC had participated.

=== The Amy Award ===
The Amy Award is presented to women poets age 30 and under living in the New York City metropolitan area or on Long Island. Winners receive an honorarium and a reading in New York City. The award was established by Paula Trachtman and Edward Butscher of East Hampton, New York in memory of Ms. Trachtman's daughter, Amy Rothholz, an actor and poet.

=== Barnes & Noble Writers for Writers Award ===
Established in 1996, the Barnes & Noble Writers for Writers Award, which is presented at P&W's annual dinner, recognizes authors who have given generously to other writers or to the broader literary community. Honorees are nominated by a committee composed of past winners, other prominent writers, and the Board of Directors of Poets & Writers.
