= Pittsburgh Book of Contemporary American Poetry =

The Pittsburgh Book of Contemporary American Poetry
- Author: Ed Ochester & Peter Oresick
- Language: English
- Genre: Poetry
- Publisher: University of Pittsburgh Press
- Publication date: June 1993
- Publication place: United States
- Media type: Print (hardcover)
- Pages: 418
- ISBN: 0-8229-3752-2
- OCLC: 27265046

The Pittsburgh Book of Contemporary American Poetry is a literary anthology of American poetry commemorating the twenty-fifth anniversary of the Pitt Poetry Series (1968–1993), one of the most prominent in the United States.

The book provides lengthy selections—about three hundred lines of verse—of the forty-five poets who were in print with the series in its twenty-fifth anniversary year. During this period, first under the editorship of Paul Zimmer, and then Ed Ochester, 156 books by 102 poets were published.

The collection was edited by Ed Ochester and Peter Oresick, both of the University of Pittsburgh.

== Selected Poets in The Pittsburgh Book of Contemporary American Poetry ==
Claribel Alegría · Maggie Anderson · Siv Cedering · Toi Derricotte · Stuart Dybek · David Huddle · Lawrence Joseph · Julia Kasdorf · Etheridge Knight · Ted Kooser · Larry Levis · Peter Meinke · Carol Muske · Leonard Nathan · Sharon Olds · Alicia Ostriker · Richard Shelton · Betsy Sholl · Gary Soto · David Wojahn
