= 1993 in poetry =

Nationality words link to articles with information on the nation's poetry or literature (for instance, Irish or France).

== Events ==
- January 20 — Maya Angelou reads "On the Pulse of Morning" at the inauguration of President Bill Clinton.
- March 31–April 3 — Writing from the New Coast: First Festival of Poetry held at the State University of New York at Buffalo. Many influential younger poets attend the conference. The final, two-volume issue of o•blék magazine this year will contain writing presented at the conference.
- December 8 — Start of the University of Buffalo POETICS listserv, informally and variously known as UBPOETICS or the POETICS list, one of the oldest and most widely known mailing lists devoted to the discussion of contemporary North American poetry and poetics. In the early days of the list, membership, list discussions and even the existence of the list itself were kept private, and members were required not to discuss the contents of list postings or the list itself with "outsiders." People who wished to join the list were asked to provide a short "personal statement" before being approved.
- T. S. Eliot Prize created.
- Reality television contest Million's Poet (Arabic: شاعر المليون) is launched in the United Arab Emirates.
- Bound by Honor, a film directed by Taylor Hackford, based on the life of poet Jimmy Santiago Baca, who co-wrote the screenplay, is released.
- Poetic Justice, a film directed by John Singleton, features Maya Angelou's poetry, and she appears as Aunt June.
- Poesia sempre, is created by the National Library of Brazil to promote poetry both from that nation and from beyond its borders and provide a forum for debate on poetry
- A new Yiddish monthly journal, Di yidishe gas ("The Jewish Street"), edited by Aron Vergelis, appears in Moscow. It is the first since the Sovetish heymland ("Soviet Homeland") became defunct.
- American literary magazine o•blék (pronounced "oblique"), founded in 1987 by Peter Gizzi who co-edited it with Connell McGrath, stopped publishing.

== Works published in English ==
Listed by nation where the work was first published and again by the poet's native land, if different; substantially revised works listed separately:

=== Australia ===
- Jennifer Maiden, Acoustic Shadow, Penguin
- Philip Salom: Feeding the Ghost, Penguin, ISBN 978-0-14-058692-3
- John Tranter:
  - Under Berlin, University of Queensland Press
  - The Floor of Heaven, HarperCollins/Angus & Robertson
- Chris Wallace-Crabbe, Rungs of Time, Oxford University Press

=== Canada ===
- George Bowering:
  - The Moustache: Remembering Greg Curnoe
  - George Bowering Selected: Poems 1961–1992
- Marilyn Bowering, Love as It Is
- Leonard Cohen, Stranger Music: Selected Poems and Songs, selected from works written between 1956 and 1992
- Sheree Fitch, In This House Are Many Women
- Judith Fitzgerald:
  - Walkin' Wounded, including a cycle of baseball poems
  - "Habit of Blues", a prose poem meditating on the fate of the late novelist Juan Butler.
- Bryan Gooch and Maureen Niwa, editors, The Emergence of the Muse: Major Canadian Poets from Crawford to Pratt, Toronto: Oxford University Press (scholarship)
- Irving Layton, Fornalutx
- Dennis Lee, Riffs London, Ont.: Brick Books.
- Gwendolyn MacEwen:
  - Atwood, Margaret and Barry Callaghan, eds. The Poetry of Gwendolyn MacEwen: The Early Years (Volume One). Toronto: Exile Editions. ISBN 978-1-55096-543-8
  - Atwood, Margaret and Barry Callaghan, eds. The Poetry of Gwendolyn MacEwen: The Later Years (Volume Two). Toronto: Exile Editions. ISBN 978-1-55096-547-6
- A. F. Moritz, The Ruined Cottage
- bp Nichol:
  - Truth: A Book of Fictions
  - First Screening
- Hernert Rosengarten and Amanda Goldrick-Jones, editors, Broadview Anthology of Poetry, anthology of American, British and Canadian poetry; ISBN 978-1-55111-006-6
- Raymond Souster, Old Bank Notes. Ottawa: Oberon.
- Raymond Souster, Riding the Long Black Horse, Ottawa: Oberon.

=== India, in English ===
- Sudeep Sen, Parallel ( Poetry in English ), with compact disc/audio cassette; Edinburgh: The Scottish Poetry Library
- Arundhathi Subramaniam, editor, In Their Own Voice: The Penguin Anthology of Contemporary Indian Women Poets, anthology; New Delhi: Penguin, ISBN 0-14-015643-7.
- Makarand Paranjape, editor, Indian Poetry in English, Madras: Macmillan India Ltd.

=== Ireland ===
- Fergus Allen, The Brown Parrots of Providencia, including "Elegy for Faustina" and "The Fall", Faber and Faber, Irish poet published in the United Kingdom
- Pat Boran, Familiar Things, publisher: Dedalus
- Ciaran Carson, First Language, including "Ovid: Metamorphoses, V, 529–550" and "Bagpipe Music", Oldcastle: The Gallery Press, ISBN 978-1-85235-128-1
- Michael D. Higgins, The Season of Fire
- Medbh McGuckian, The Flower Master and Other Poems, including "The Seed-picture", "Gateposts" and "The Flower Master", Oldcastle: The Gallery Press
- Martin Mooney, Grub, including "Anna Akhmatova's Funeral", Belfast: The Blackstaff Press
- W. R. Rodgers, Poems, including "Lent", "The Net" and "Stormy Night", Oldcastle: The Gallery Press

=== New Zealand ===
- Fleur Adcock (New Zealand poet who moved to England in 1963), Mary Magdalene and the Birds: Mezzo-soprano and Clarinet, by Dorothy Buchanan, with words by Fleur Adcock, Wellington: Waiteata Press
- Andrew Johnston, Sol How to Talk, winner of the 1994 New Zealand Book Award for Poetry and the 1994 Jessie Mackay Best First Book Award
- Cilla McQueen, Crïk'ey: New and Selected Poems
- W. H. Oliver, Bodily Presence: Words, Paintings, co-author: Anne Munz; Wellington: BlackBerry Press, New Zealand
- Keith Sinclair, Moontalk
- Ian Wedde, The Drummer

=== United Kingdom ===
- Fleur Adcock (New Zealand poet who moved to England in 1963), Mary Magdalene and the Birds: Mezzo-soprano and Clarinet, by Dorothy Buchanan, with words by Fleur Adcock, Wellington: Waiteata Press
- Fergus Allen, The Brown Parrots of Providencia, including "Elegy for Faustina" and "The Fall", Faber and Faber, Irish poet published in the United Kingdom
- Moniza Alvi, The Country at my Shoulder
- Simon Armitage, Book of Matches
- Barbara Bleiman editor, Five Modern Poets: Fleur Adcock, U. A. Fanthorpe, Tony Harrison, Anne Stevenson, Derek Walcott, Harlow, England: Longman
- Ciarán Carson: First Language: Poems, Gallery Books, Wake Forest University Press, Irish poet published in the United Kingdom
- Gillian Clarke, The King of Britain's Daughter
- Blaga Dimitrova, Bulgaria's popular vice president, The Last Rock Eagle, a translation of several of her poems
- Carol Ann Duffy, Mean Time, Anvil Press Poetry
- Douglas Dunn, Dante's Drum-Kit
- Paul Durcan, A Snail in my Prime
- D. J. Enright, Old Men and Comets
- James Fenton, Out of Danger
- Roy Fuller, Last Poems
- W. S. Graham, Aimed at Nobody (posthumous)
- Thom Gunn, Collected Poems
- Tony Harrison, Black Daisies for the Bride
- Seamus Heaney:
  - Keeping Going, Bow and Arrow Press
  - Translator: The Midnight Verdict: Translations from the Irish of Brian Merriman and from the Metamorphoses of Ovid, Gallery Press
- John Heath-Stubbs, Sweet-Apple Earth
- Jackie Kay, Other Lovers
- James Kirkup, Blue Bamboo
- Jamie McKendrick, The Kiosk on the Brink
- E. A. Markham, Letter from Ulster and the Hugo Poems
- Anna Mendelssohn (as Grace Lake), Viola Tricolor
- Sean O'Brien, A Rarity (Carnivorous Arpeggio)
- Tom Rawling, The Names of the Sea-Trout
- Carol Rumens, Thinking of Skins
- Labi Siffre, Nigger
- R. S. Thomas, Collected Poems, 1945–1990

==== Criticism, scholarship and biography in the United Kingdom ====
- Elmer Andrews, editor, The Poetry of Seamus Heaney, ISBN 0-231-11926-7
- Thomas N. Corns, editor, Cambridge Companion to English Poetry, Donne to Marvell, Cambridge: Cambridge University Press
- Michael Parker, Seamus Heaney: The Making of the Poet, ISBN 0-333-47181-4

=== United States ===
- Ai, Greed
- A.R. Ammons, Garbage, a book-length poem about American trash and its implications, winner of the National Book Award for Poetry this year and the 1994 Bobbitt National Prize for Poetry
- Jared Carter, After the Rain, winner of the Poets' Prize for 1994
- Geoffrey Dearmer, A Pilgrim's Song: Selected Poems
- Mark Doty, My Alexandria
- Petya Dubarova, Here I Am, in Perfect Leaf Today (posthumous), translated from Bulgarian to English by Don D. Wilson
- Jerry Estrin, Rome, A Mobile Home
- Margaret Gibson, The Vigil
- Donald Hall, Life Work, memoir
- John Hollander:
  - Selected Poetry
  - Tesserae and Other Poems
- Daniel Halpern, editor, The Inferno by Dante, 21 living American poets wrote their versions of the cantos
- Meto Jovanovski, Faceless Men and Other Macedonian Stories, translated from Macedonian to English by Charles Simic in collaboration with Milne Holton and Jeffrey Folks.
- Susan Ludvigson, Everything Winged Must Be Dreaming
- Jack Marshall, Sesame
- W. S. Merwin:
  - The Second Four Books of Poems, Port Townsend, Washington: Copper Canyon Press
  - W. S. Merwin, Travels: Poems, New York: Knopf
- Lorine Niedecker and Louis Zukofsky, Niedecker and the Correspondence with Zukofsky 1931–1970, edited by Jenny Penberthy (Cambridge University Press)
- Ed Ochester & Peter Oresick, Pittsburgh Book of Contemporary American Poetry (University of Pittsburgh Press)
- Jim Powell, translator, Sappho: A Garland, new translations of the poems and fragments of the 6th-century BC poet
- Lawrence Raab, What We Don't Know About Each Other
- Adrienne Rich, Collected Early Poems, 1950–1970
- David Rosenberg, translator, The Lost Book of Paradise, a verse translation of Genesis
- Sherod Santos, The City of Women, a sequence of poems and prose
- Sappho, Sappho: A Garland, new translations of the poems and fragments, translated by Jim Powell
- James Schuyler, Collected Poems
- Frederick Seidel, My Tokyo
- Charles Simic, translator, The Horse Has Six Legs: An Anthology of Serbian Poetry, from Serbian into English, including Serbian poets Ivan V. Lalić, Vasko Popa, Momčilo Nastasijević, and Nina Zivancevic.
- Sande Stojcevski, A Gate in the Cloud, translated by David Bowen and others from Macedonian to English, with more than 50 of the poet's lyrics.
- Mark Strand, Dark Harbor, Canadian native living in and published in the United States
- Luci Tapahonso, Saanii Dahataal
- Rosmarie Waldrop, Lawn of the Excluded Middle (Tender Buttons)
- Rosanna Warren, Stained Glass
- Eliot Weinberger, editor, American Poetry Since 1950: Innovators and Outsiders (Marsilio Publishers)

==== Criticism, scholarship and biography in the United States ====
- Donald Hall, Life Work, a memoir
- Jay Parini, editor, The Columbia History of American Poetry
- Alex Preminger, and T. V. F. Brogan, editors, The New Princeton Encyclopedia of Poetry and Poetics, Princeton, New Jersey: Princeton University Press
- Adrienne Rich, What Is Found There: Notebooks on Poetry and Politics
- Delmore Schwartz and James Laughlin, Selected Letters, correspondence between the poet and his publisher

==== Anthologies in the United States ====
- Don Burness, editor, Echoes of the Sunbird: An Anthology of Contemporary African Poetry, Athens: Ohio University Center for International Studies
- John Hollander, editor, American Poetry, the Nineteenth Century, two volumes (Library of America)
- Garrett Hongo, editor, The Open Boat: Poems from Asian America, New York: Doubleday

===== Poets included in The Best American Poetry 1993 =====
Poems from these 75 poets were in The Best American Poetry 1993, edited by David Lehman, guest editor Louise Glück:

- A. R. Ammons
- John Ashbery
- Michael Atkinson
- Stephen Berg
- Sophie Cabot Black
- Stephanie Brown
- Charles Bukowski
- Hayden Carruth
- Tom Clark
- Killarney Clary
- Marc Cohen
- Billy Collins
- Peter Cooley
- Carolyn Creedon
- Barbara Cully
- Carl Dennis
- Tim Dlugos
- Stephen Dobyns
- Denise Duhamel
- Stephen Dunn
- Roger Fanning
- Alice B. Fogel
- Tess Gallagher
- Albert Goldbarth
- Jorie Graham
- Allen Grossman
- Thom Gunn
- Donald Hall
- Mark Halliday
- Daniel Halpern
- Paul Hoover
- David Ignatow
- Josephine Jacobsen
- Mark Jarman
- Rodney Jones
- Donald Justice
- Brigit Pegeen Kelly
- Robert Kelly
- Jane Kenyon
- Pamela Kircher
- Kenneth Koch
- Phyllis Koestenbaum
- Stanley Kunitz
- Denise Levertov
- Lisa Lewis
- Thomas Lux
- Elizabeth Macklin
- Tom Mandel
- James McMichael
- Sandra McPherson
- W.S. Merwin
- Susan Mitchell
- A. F. Moritz
- Mary Oliver
- Ron Padgett
- Michael Palmer
- Lucia Maria Perillo
- Wang Ping
- Lawrence Raab
- Adrienne Rich
- Laura Riding
- Gjertrud Schnackenberg
- Hugh Seidman
- Charles Simic
- Louis Simpsom
- Gary Snyder
- Gerald Stern
- Ruth Stone
- Mark Strand
- James Tate
- John Updike
- Ellen Bryant Voigt
- Susan Wheeler
- C. K. Williams
- Dean Young

== Works published in other languages ==
Listed by nation where the work was first published and again by the poet's native land, if different; substantially revised works listed separately:

=== Denmark ===
- Kirsten Hammann, Jeg er så træt af min krop (Mellem tænderne), publisher: Gyldendal; Denmark
- Pia Tafdrup, Krystalskoven
- Henrik Nordbrandt, Støvets tyngde
- Thorkild Bjørnvig, Siv vand og måne
- Kirsten Hammann, Vera Vinkelvir, a cross between a prose poem and a novel

=== French language ===
==== Canada ====
- Claude Beausoleil, L'Usage du temps
- Louise Dupré, Noir déjà
- Madeleine Gagnon, La Terre est remplie de langage
- Serge-Patrice Thibodeau, Le Cycle de Prague

==== France ====
- Olivier Barbarant, Douze lettres d'amore au soldat inconnu, publisher: Editions Champ Vallon; ISBN 978-2-87673-164-6
- Yves Bonnefoy:
  - La vie errante
  - Une autre époque de l'écriture
- Claude Esteban, Sept jours d'hier, Fourbis
- Abdellatif Laabi, L'Étreinte du monde; Paris; Moroccan author writing in French and published in France
- Yves Leclair, L'or du commun

=== Germany ===
- Christoph Buchwald, general editor, and Robert Gernhardt, guest editor, Jahrbuch der Lyrik 9 ("Poetry Yearbook 9"), publisher: Luchterhand; anthology
- Heinz Czechowski, Nachtspur
- Wulf Kirsten, Stimmenschotter
- Richard Wagner, Heisse Maroni

=== Hebrew ===
- Mordechai Geldman, A'yin ("Eye")
- Israel Eliraz, Pe Karu'a ("A Torn Mouth")
- Tamir Greenberg, Dyokan Atzmi Im Qvant veHatul Met ("Self Portrait with Quantum and Dead Cat")
- Zvika Shternfeld, Hamarkiza miGovari ("The Marquise of Govari")
- Shimon Shloush, Tola Havui shel Asham ("A Hidden Worm of Guilt")

=== India ===
Listed in alphabetical order by first name:

- Gulzar, Chand Pukhraj Ka; Urdu-language
- K. Satchidanandan, Ente Satchidanandan Kavitakal, selected poems; Malayalam-language
- Kanaka Ha Ma, Holebagilu, Sagara, Karnataka: Akshara Prakashana; Kannada language
- Kunwar Narain, Koee Doosra Naheen, New Delhi: Rajkamal Prakashan, ISBN 81-267-0007-6; Hindi-language
- Mallika Sengupta, Ardheke Prithivi, Kolkata: Ananda Publishers; Bengali-language
- Manushya Puthiran, En Padukai araiyil yaroo olithirukirargal, Chennai: South Asian Books, Tamil language
- Nilmani Phookan, editor, Aranyar Gan, an anthology of Indian tribal love poems; Guwahati, Assam: Students' Store, Assamese-language
- Prabodh Parikh, Kaunsman ("Between Parentheses/In Brackets"), winner of several awards, including Best Poetry Collection of 1993-94 from the Gujarat Sahitya Akademi and the G.F. Saraf Award for Best Gujarati Book in 1992–1995; Mumbai: R.R. Sheth Publishers; Gujarati-language

=== Poland ===
- Ewa Lipska, Wakacje mizantropa. Utwory wybrane ("Misanthrope Holidays: Selected Work"), Kraków: Wydawnictwo literackie
- Jarosław Marek Rymkiewicz, Moje dzielo posmiertne ("My Posthumous Works") Kraków: Znak
- Wisława Szymborska: Koniec i początek ("The End and the Beginning")
- Jan Twardowski:
  - Kasztan dla milionera: Wiersze dla dzieci, Warsaw: Nasza Księgarnia
  - Krzyżyk na drogę ("Cross the Road"), Kraków: Znak

=== Portuguese language ===
==== Portugal ====
- Joaquim Manuel Magalhães, A poeira levada pelo vento

==== Brazil ====
- Waly Salamão, Armarinho da miudezas, which reflects native Bahian traditions
- Sebastião Uchoa Leite, published a poetry book
- Felipe Fortuna published a poetry book
- Adão Ventura, Texturaafro,

=== Serbia ===
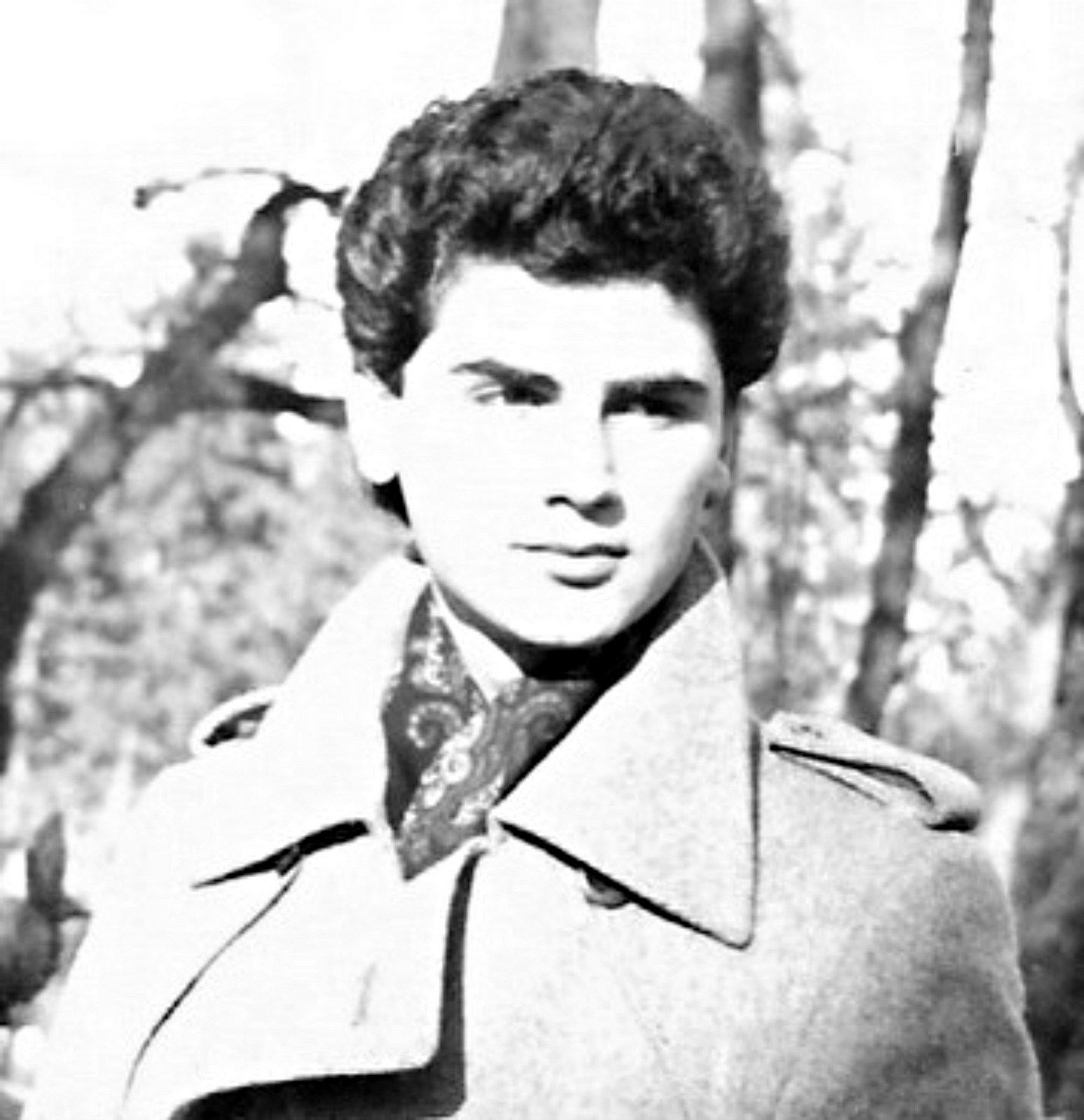
Dejan Stojanović in Belgrade, 1981

- Miodrag Pavlović:
  - Knjiga horizonta ("The Book of Horizon")
  - Nebo v pećini ("The Sky in the Rocks")
  - Ogledi o narodnoj i staros srpskoj poeziji ("A Treatise on Folk and Old Serbian Poetry"), scholarship
- Dejan Stojanović, Krugovanje: 1978–1987 ("Circling"), first edition, Narodna knjiga–Alfa, Beograd

=== Spain ===
- Matilde Camus, Amor dorado ("Golden Love")
- Ángel González, Poemas
- Xavier Sabater, editor, Poesía experimental 93, a visual poetry anthology; Barcelona: Sedicions

=== Sweden ===
- Jesper Svenbro:
  - Blått ("Blue")
  - Samisk Apollon och andra dikter ("The Sami Apollo and Other Poems")
- Henrik Nilsson, Utan skor

=== Yiddish ===
- Israel Chaim Biletzky, Uri Zvi Greenberg Der Yidish-Dikhter ("Uri Tsvi Grinberg: The Yiddish Poet") biography on the poet

=== Other ===
- Lindita Arapi, Kufomë lulesh, Albania
- Blaga Dimitrova, Bulgaria's popular vice president, Noshten dnevnik ("Night Diary"), 70 poems written from 1989 to 1992
- Lo Fu (Luo Fu), Hidden Title Poems, Chinese (Taiwan)
- Cathal Ó Searcaigh, Homecoming/An Bealach 'na Bhaile, including "Bo Bhradach", "Na Piopai Creafoige", and "Caoineadh", Gaelic-language, Ireland
- Novica Tadić, Night Mail: Selected Poems, Macedonia
- Yu Jian, Dui yi zhi wuya de mingming, Chinese

== Awards and honors ==
=== Australia ===
- C. J. Dennis Prize for Poetry: Les Murray, Translations from the Natural World
- Dinny O'Hearn Poetry Prize: At the Florida by John Tranter
- Kenneth Slessor Prize for Poetry: Les Murray, Translations from the Natural World
- Mary Gilmore Prize: Jill Jones - The Mask and Jagged Star

=== Canada ===
- Gerald Lampert Award: Elisabeth Harvor, Fortress of Chairs and Roberta Rees, Eyes Like Pigeons
- Archibald Lampman Award: Marianne Bluger, Summer Grass
- 1993 Governor General's Awards: Don Coles, Forests of the Medieval World (English); Denise Desautels, Le Saut de l'ange
- Pat Lowther Award: Lorna Crozier, Inventing the Hawk
- Prix Alain-Grandbois: Anne Hébert, Le Jour n'a d'égal que la nuit
- Dorothy Livesay Poetry Prize: Bill Bissett, inkorrect thots [sic]
- Prix Émile-Nelligan: Martin-Pierre Tremblay, Le Plus Petit Désert

=== India ===
- Poetry Society India National Poetry Competition : Shampa Sinha for Siesta

=== United Kingdom ===
- Cholmondeley Award: Patricia Beer, George Mackay Brown, P. J. Kavanagh, Michael Longley
- Forward Poetry Prize Best Collection: Carol Ann Duffy, Mean Time (Anvil Press)
- Forward Poetry Prize Best First Collection: Don Paterson, Nil Nil (Faber and Faber)
- T. S. Eliot Prize (United Kingdom and Ireland): Ciaran Carson, First Language: Poems
- Whitbread Award for poetry: Carol Ann Duffy, Mean Time
- National Poetry Competition : Sam Gardiner for Protestant Windows

=== United States ===
- Agnes Lynch Starrett Poetry Prize: Natasha Sajé, Red Under the Skin
- Aiken Taylor Award for Modern American Poetry: George Starbuck
- AML Award for poetry to Linda Sillitoe for "Crazy Living"
- Bernard F. Connors Prize for Poetry: Stephen Yenser, "Blue Guide"
- Bollingen Prize (United States): Mark Strand
- Frost Medal: William Stafford
- National Book Award for poetry (United States): A.R. Ammons, Garbage (will also win 1994 Bobbitt National Prize for Poetry)
- Poet Laureate Consultant in Poetry to the Library of Congress: Rita Dove appointed
- Pulitzer Prize for Poetry: Louise Glück, The Wild Iris
- Rhysling Award:
  - William J. Daciuk, To Be from Earth (Long Form)
  - Jane Yolen, Will (Short Form)
- Ruth Lilly Poetry Prize: Charles Wright
- Whiting Awards: Mark Levine, Nathaniel Mackey, Dionisio D. Martinez, Kathleen Peirce
- Fellowship of the Academy of American Poets: Gerald Stern

== Deaths ==
Birth years link to the corresponding "[year] in poetry" article:

- April 23 – Bertus Aafjes, 89 (born 1914), Dutch poet
- June 19 – William Golding, 82 (born 1919), English novelist, poet and winner of the 1983 Nobel Prize for Literature
- June 22 – Jerry Estrin, 46 (born 1947 in poetry), American poet (Rome, A Mobile Home) and magazine editor (Vanishing Cab)
- August 28 – William Stafford, 79, American poet and pacifist, and father of poet and essayist Kim Stafford
- September 16 – Oodgeroo Noonuccal, 71, Australian poet, actress, writer, teacher, artist and campaigner for Aboriginal causes
- September 26 – Nina Berberova, Нина Николаевна Берберова (born 1901), Russian-born poet, novelist, playwright, critic and academic who lived in Europe from 1922 to 1950, then in the United States
- October 27 – Peter Quennell, 88, English biographer, historian and poet
- October (exact date not known) – Gu Cheng, Chinese poet, by suicide
- December 4
  - Parijat, पारिजात, Bishnu Kumari Waiba, c.56 (born 1937), Nepalese novelist and poet
  - Seán Rafferty, 83 (born 1909), Scottish-born poet and pub landlord

== See also ==
- Poetry
- List of years in poetry
- List of poetry awards
