= For a Living =

1995 book

For a Living: The Poetry of Work
- Author: Nicholas Coles & Peter Oresick
- Language: English
- Subject: Working-class literature
- Genre: Poetry
- Publisher: University of Illinois Press
- Publication date: September 1995
- Publication place: United States
- Media type: Print (paperback)
- Pages: 432
- ISBN: 978-0-252-06410-4
- OCLC: 29845143

For a Living: The Poetry of Work is a literary anthology of American labor poetry written during the 1980s and 1990s.

The book identifies within American literature of the current Information Age or service economy a new work poetry about the nature and culture of nonindustrial work: white collar, pink collar, domestic, clerical, technical, managerial, or professional. The poems cross lines of status, class, and gender and range from mopping floors to television news reporting, Wall Street brokerage, and raising children. The anthology offers nearly two hundred poems by ninety-six poets, most of whom are of the baby boomer generation.

The collection was edited by Nicholas Coles and Peter Oresick, both of the University of Pittsburgh. It is a companion volume to their critically acclaimed Working Classics: Poems on Industrial Life, an anthology of blue-collar work poetry. For a Living remains in print since its first publication in 1995 by the University of Illinois Press.

"[This] new anthology . . . challenges the view that work is a less provocative subject than nature, spirituality or even love. . . . For a Living liberates the voices of those we work alongside every day without perhaps really hearing them."

— Carol Hymowitz, The Wall Street Journal

== Selected poets in For a Living ==
Ai · Maggie Anderson · John Ashbery · Dorothy Barresi · Jan Beatty · Wanda Coleman · Jim Daniels · Toi Derricotte · Cornelius Eady · Martín Espada · Alice Fulton · Tess Gallagher · Dana Gioia · Albert Goldbarth · Judy Grahn · Edward Hirsch · David Ignatow · Denis Johnson · Lawrence Joseph · Maxine Hong Kingston · Susan Kinsolving · Ted Kooser · Brad Leithauser · Philip Levine · Thomas Lynch · Campbell McGrath · Joyce Carol Oates · Ed Ochester · Sharon Olds · Alicia Ostriker · Louis Simpson · Michelle Tokarczyk · John Updike · Judith Vollmer · Tom Wayman · C. K. Williams
