= Working Classics =

Working Classics: Poems on Industrial Life
- Author: Peter Oresick Nicholas Coles
- Language: English
- Subject: Working-class literature
- Genre: Poetry
- Publisher: University of Illinois Press
- Publication date: September 1990
- Publication place: United States
- Media type: Print (paperback)
- Pages: 304
- ISBN: 978-0-252-06133-2
- OCLC: 20753880

Working Classics: Poems on Industrial Life is a literary anthology of American working-class poetry written during the second half of the 20th century.

The book identifies within post-World War II American literature an emerging trend: a new poetry about mills and mines and blue-collar neighborhoods. Much of this verse was inspired by the postwar industrial prosperity of the 1950s and 1960s followed by rapid deindustrialization in the United States in the 1970s and 1980s. The anthology offers nearly two hundred poems by seventy-five poets, most of whom are of the baby boomer generation.

The collection was conceived and compiled by Peter Oresick and further developed with co-editor Nicholas Coles, both of the University of Pittsburgh. This "new work writing," argue the editors, "has its antecedents not with the proletarian literature of 1930s, but more with Walt Whitman, William Carlos Williams, the Beats, and Confessional poetry."

Working Classics is frequently used in U.S. and Canadian university courses in literature and labor history. It remains in print since its first publication in 1990 by the University of Illinois Press.

The anthology's strong critical reception and sales, as well as a prompt within a book review of Working Classics by Fred Pfeil in The Village Voice, spawned a sequel in 1995 by the same editors called For a Living: The Poetry of Work. This companion volume features poems about the nature and culture of nonindustrial work in the current Information Age or service economy, i.e. work that may be categorized as white collar, pink collar, clerical, or professional.

"A great feast of an anthology. . . . Here is a volume of great diversity, challenge, and reward, a Midwestern dark horse of a book whose riches, coming from the coal mines, canneries, sweatshops and factories of the country, compose an unprecedently American (and slightly Canadian) experience".

Jessica Greenbaum, The Nation

== Selected Poets in Working Classics ==
Maggie Anderson · Antler · Robert Bly · Jim Daniels · Patricia Dobler · Stephen Dunn · Tess Gallagher · John Giorno · Donald Hall · Edward Hirsch · Richard Hugo · David Ignatow · June Jordan · Lawrence Joseph · Philip Levine · Robert Mezey · Lisel Mueller · Joyce Carol Oates · Ed Ochester · Jay Parini · Kenneth Patchen · Vern Rutsala · Michael Ryan · James Scully · Gary Soto · Susan Stewart · Tom Wayman · James Wright · Robert Wrigley
