= Ed Ochester =

American poet and editor (1939–2023)

Edwin Frank Ochester (September 15, 1939 – August 22, 2023) was an American poet and editor. He was born in Brooklyn, New York, and educated at Cornell, Harvard, and the University of Wisconsin–Madison.

For nearly twenty years, Ochester served as director of the writing program at the University of Pittsburgh, and he was twice elected president of the Association of Writers & Writing Programs. From 1967 to 1970, he was assistant professor of English at the University of Florida, Gainesville.

From 1979, he served as general editor of the Pitt Poetry Series, one of the largest lists of contemporary American poetry, published by the University of Pittsburgh Press. Ochester was also general editor of the Drue Heinz Literature Prize for short fiction.

Poets published by Ochester in the Pitt Series include Sharon Olds, Billy Collins, Ted Kooser, Lawrence Joseph, Richard Shelton, Larry Levis, Denise Duhamel, Lynn Emanuel, Bob Hicok, Jim Daniels, Gary Soto, Stuart Dybek, Kathleen Norris, Alicia Ostriker, Toi Derricotte, Dean Young, and David Wojahn.

His book Dancing on the Edges of Knives won the 1973 Devins Award for Poetry, and he has won fellowships in poetry from the National Endowment for the Arts and the Pennsylvania Council on the Arts.

He died in August 2023, at the age of 83.

== Works ==
- We Like It Here, poetry (Madison: Quixote Press, 1967)
- The Great Bourgeois Bus Company, poetry (Madison: Quixote Press, 1969)
- The Third Express, poetry (Madison: Quixote Press, 1973)
- Natives: An Anthology of Contemporary American Poetry, (editor), poetry anthology (Madison: Quixote Press, 1973)
- Dancing on the Edges of Knives, poetry (Columbia: University of Missouri Press, 1973)
- The End of the Ice Age, poetry (Pittsburgh: Slow Loris Press, 1977)
- A Drift of Swine, poetry (Birmingham: Thunder City Press, 1979)
- Miracle Mile, poetry (Pittsburgh: Carnegie Mellon University Press, 1984)
- Weehawken Ferry, poetry (Bangor: Juniper Press, 1985)
- Changing the Name to Ochester, poetry (Pittsburgh: Carnegie Mellon University Press, 1988)
- The Pittsburgh Book of Contemporary American Poetry, (co-editor with Peter Oresick), poetry anthology, (Pittsburgh: University of Pittsburgh Press, 1993)
- Allegheny, poetry (Easthampton: Adastra Press, 1995)
- Cooking in Key West, poetry (Easthampton: Adastra Press, 2000)
- Snow White Horses: Selected Poems 1973–1988, poetry (Pittsburgh: Autumn House Press, 2000)
- The Land of Cockaigne, poetry (Ashland: Story Line Press, 2001)
- American Poetry Now: Pitt Poetry Series Anthology, poetry anthology, (Pittsburgh: University of Pittsburgh Press, 2007)
- The Republic of Lies, poetry (Easthampton: Adastra Press, 2007)
- Unreconstructed: Poems Selected and New, poetry (Pittsburgh: Autumn House Press, 2007)
- Sugar Run Road, poetry (Pittsburgh: Autumn House Press, 2015)

== Sources ==
- Contemporary Authors Online. The Gale Group, 2002. PEN (Permanent Entry Number): 0000074046.
