= David Rivard =

American poet (born 1953)

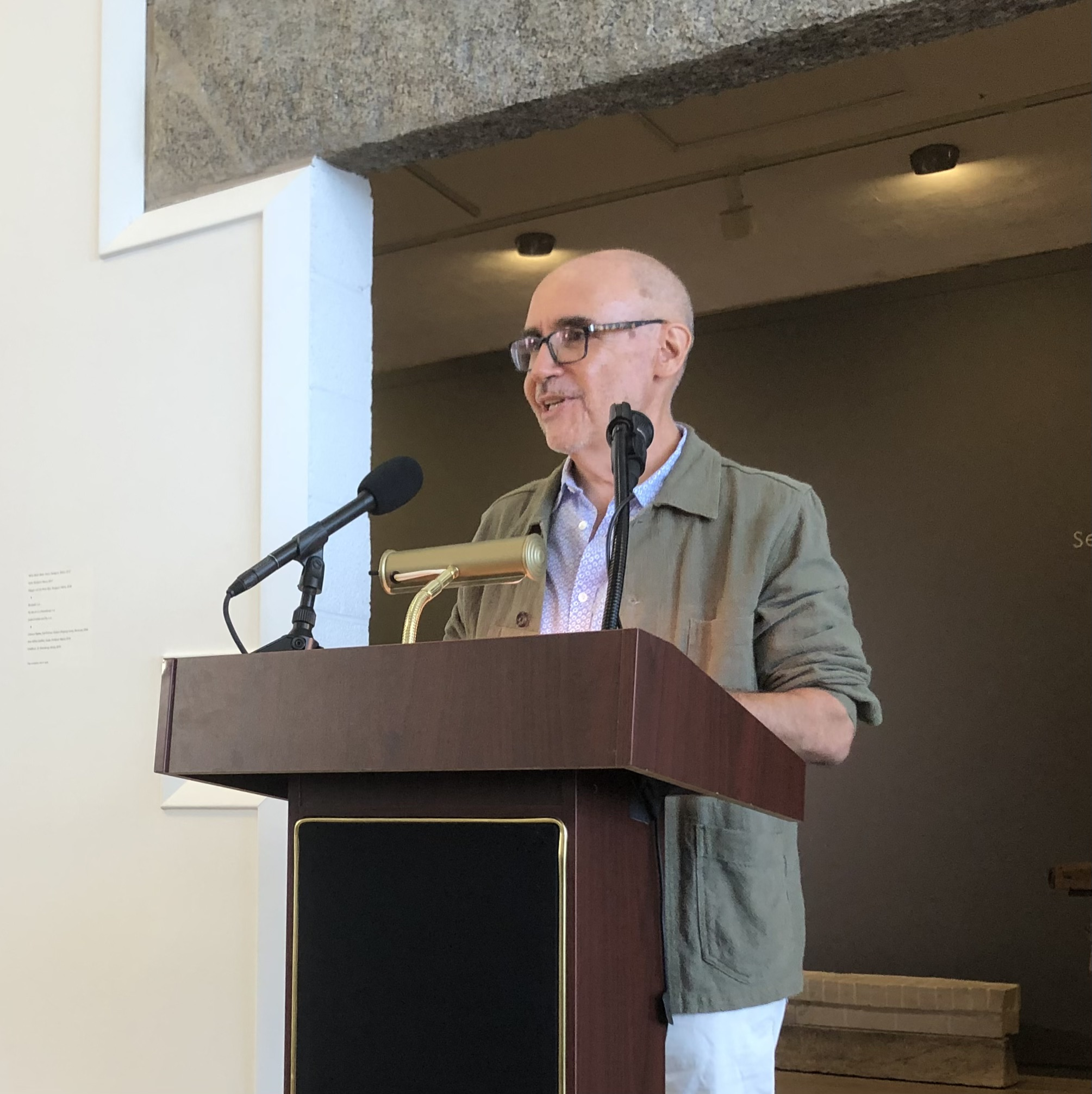
- Rivard reading at the Ogunquit Museum of American Art in 2019.
- Born: Fall River, Massachusetts, US
- Writing career
- Genre: Poetry
- Notable work: Wise Poison
- Notable awards: Guggenheim Fellowship

David Rivard (born 1953 in Fall River, Massachusetts) is an American poet. He is the author of seven books including Wise Poison, winner the 1996 James Laughlin Award, and Standoff, winner the 2017 PEN New England Award in Poetry. He is also a Professor of English Creative Writing in the Masters of Fine Arts program at the University of New Hampshire.

His poems and essays have appeared in numerous literary magazines, including New England Review, Ploughshares, Poetry, and TriQuarterly.

== Early life ==
Rivard was born in Fall River, Massachusetts and grew up in a blue-collar family of civil servants and dressmakers. His father was a fireman and his great-grandfather is the first Portuguese policeman in Fall River. He is the oldest of four.

Rivard holds a B.A. from the University of Massachusetts Dartmouth and an M.F.A. from the University of Arizona. He studied under Jon Anderson, Tess Gallagher, and Steve Orlen. Among his classmates were Tony Hoagland, David Wojahn, and Li-Young Lee.

== Awards ==
- Two grants from the National Endowment for the Arts
- Fellowship from the Massachusetts Arts Foundation
- Fellowship the Fine Arts Work Center in Provincetown
- Celia B. Wagner Award from the Poetry Society of America
- Pushcart Prize
- O. B. Hardison, Jr. Poetry Prize
- 1987 Agnes Lynch Starrett Poetry Prize
- 1996 James Laughlin Award for his second collection of poems Wise Poison
- 2001 Guggenheim Fellowship

== Works ==
- "Bewitched Playground". Poetry. 24 April 2023.
- "Fall River". Poetry. 25 April 2023.
- "Late?". Poetry. 25 April 2023.
- "Question for the Bride". Poetry. 25 April 2023.
- "Going". Poetry. 25 April 2023.
- "Zeus and Apollo". Poetry. 25 April 2023.
- "Torque". Poetry. 29 February 2024.

=== Ploughshares ===
- "Double Elegy, With Curse". Ploughshares. Spring 2006. Archived from the original on 2006-08-24.
- "Somewhere Between a Row of Traffic Cones and the Country Once Called Burma". Ploughshares. Spring 2006. Archived from the original on November 4, 2007.
- "Bon Ton". Ploughshares. Winter 2003–04. Archived from the original on November 5, 2007.
- "A Story About America". Ploughshares. Spring 1997. Archived from the original on August 20, 2006.
- "Welcome, Fear". Ploughshares. Winter 1994–95. Archived from the original on August 28, 2007.
- "The Shy". Ploughshares. Winter 1994–95. Archived from the original on February 17, 2007.
- "Little Wing". Ploughshares. Fall 1991. Archived from the original on May 13, 2006.

=== Books ===
- Some of You Will Know, (Arrowsmith Press, 2022) ISBN 979-8-9863401-0-4
- Standoff, (Graywolf Press, 2016) ISBN 978-1-55597-745-0
- Otherwise Elsewhere, (Graywolf Press, 2010) ISBN 978-1-55597-573-9
- Sugartown, (Graywolf Press, 2006) ISBN 978-1-55597-435-0
- Bewitched Playground, (Graywolf Press, 2000) ISBN 978-1-55597-302-5
- Wise Poison, (Graywolf Press, 1996) ISBN 978-1-55597-247-9
- Torque (1987), which won the Agnes Lynch Starrett Poetry Prize and was published by the Pitt Poetry Series.

=== Criticism ===
- "Oubliette by Peter Richards". Ploughshares. Spring 2002. Archived from the original on August 21, 2006.
- "Day Moon by Jon Anderson". Ploughshares. Spring 2001. Archived from the original on May 25, 2006.
- "Red Sauce, Whiskey and Snow by August Kleinzahler". Ploughshares. Fall 1996. Archived from the original on October 28, 2007.
- "Mercy Seat by Bruce Smith". Ploughshares. Winter 1994–95. Archived from the original on February 18, 2007.
- "The River at Wolf by Jean Valentine". Ploughshares. Fall 1993. Archived from the original on October 28, 2007.
- "All of the Above by Dorothy Barresi". Ploughshares. Winter 1992–93. Archived from the original on November 4, 2007.
