= Len Roberts =

American poet

- Born: March 13, 1947; Cohoes, New York, United States
- Died: May 25, 2007 (aged 60); Bethlehem, Pennsylvania, United States
- Occupations: Poet and professor

Len Roberts (March 13, 1947 – May 25, 2007) was an American poet.

== Life ==
He graduated from Siena College, the University of Dayton with a master's degree, and from Lehigh University with a Ph.D.

He presented some of his work at Lafayette College. Allen Ginsberg sent his manuscript to a publisher which was Cohoes Theater.

He translated three books of Hungarian poet Sándor Csoóri, whose writing helped to inspire the Hungarian Revolution of 1956.

He taught at the University of Pittsburgh, Muhlenberg College, Lafayette College, and Northampton Community College (for 33 years).

== Awards ==
- 1988, National Poetry Series Award, for Black Wings
- 1991 John Simon Guggenheim Memorial Award for poetry
- two awards from the National Endowment for the Arts
- National Endowment for the Humanities Fellowship
- two Fulbright Scholar awards

== Works ==
=== Poetry ===
- "Doing the Laundry"; "All day cutting wood, thinking"; "Contemplating Again the Jade Chrysanthemum, or Why the Ancient Chinese Poets Remained Unmarried"; "Acupuncture and Cleansing at Forty-Eight"; "Learning on Olmstead Street"; "More Walnuts, Late October", Poetry Magazine, April 2000
- Cohoes Theater. Santa Monica: Momentum Press, 1980.
- From the Dark. Albany: SUNY Press. 1984. ISBN 978-0-87395-758-8. "Len Roberts."
- Sweet Ones. Minneapolis: Milkweed Editions. 1988. ISBN 978-0-915943-24-1.
- Black Wings. New York: Persea. 1989. ISBN 978-0-89255-141-5.
- Dangerous Angels. Providence: Copper Beech Press. 1993. ISBN 978-0-914278-61-0.
- The Million Branches: Selected Poems and Interview. Mount Nebo: Yarrow Press, 1993.
- Counting the Black Angels. Urbana: University of Illinois Press. 1994. ISBN 978-0-252-06381-7. "Len Roberts."
- The Trouble-Making Finch. Urbana: University of Illinois Press. 1998. ISBN 978-0-252-06693-1.
- The Silent Singer: New and Selected Poems. Urbana: University of Illinois Press. 2001. ISBN 978-0-252-06952-9.
- The Disappearing Trick. Urbana: University of Illinois Press. 2007. ISBN 978-0-252-07374-8.

=== Translations ===
- The Selected Poems of Sándor Csoóri. Port Townsend: Copper Canyon Press. 1992. ISBN 978-1-55659-047-4.
- Sándor Csoóri (2004). Before and After the Fall: New Poems. Rochester: BOA Editions, Ltd. ISBN 978-1-929918-46-1.

=== Anthologies ===
- Peter Oresick; Nicholas Coles, eds. (1990). "Coal Miners". Working classics: poems on industrial life. University of Illinois Press. p. 206. ISBN 978-0-252-06133-2. "Len Roberts."
- Laure-Anne Bosselaar, ed. (1999). Outsiders: poems about rebels, exiles, and renegades. Milkweed Editions. ISBN 978-1-57131-409-3.
- Charles Simic; David Lehman, eds. (1992). The Best American Poetry, 1992. Simon & Schuster. ISBN 978-0-684-19501-8.
