= Jon Anderson (poet) =

American poet & educator (1940–2007)

Jon Victor Anderson
- Born: July 4, 1940; Somerville, Massachusetts, United States
- Died: October 20, 2007 (aged 67); Tucson, Arizona, United States
- Occupation: Poet
- Writing career
- Genre: Meditative/Lyric
- Notable awards: John Simon Guggenheim Memorial Foundation Fellowship, National Endowment for the Arts, and the Poetry Society of America's Shelley Memorial Award

Jon Victor Anderson (1940–2007) was an American poet and educator.

== Early life ==
Anderson was born on July 4, 1940, in Somerville, Massachusetts, to Henry Victor and Frances (Ladd) Anderson.

== Education ==
Anderson earned a BS from Northeastern University (1964) and a MFA from the Iowa Writers' Workshop at the University of Iowa (1968).

== Works ==
Anderson's first book, Looking for Jonathan, was an inaugural selection of the Pitt Poetry Series of the University of Pittsburgh Press in 1967. His second, Death & Friends, was nominated for the National Book Award.

- Looking for Jonathan, poetry (Pittsburgh: University of Pittsburgh Press, 1968)
- Death & Friends, poetry (Pittsburgh: University of Pittsburgh Press, 1970)
- In Sepia, poetry (Pittsburgh: University of Pittsburgh Press, 1974)
- Counting the Days, poetry (Lisbon: Penumbra, 1974)
- Cypresses, poetry (Port Townsend: Graywolf Press, 1981)
- The Milky Way: Poems 1967-1982, poetry (New York: Ecco Press, 1983)
- Day Moon, poetry (Pittsburgh: Carnegie Mellon University Press, 2001)

== Accolades ==
He won a Guggenheim Fellowship from the John Simon Guggenheim Memorial Foundation in 1976; the Shelley Memorial Award from Poetry Society of America in 1983 for career achievement; and a National Endowment for the Arts fellowship in poetry in 1986.

== Teaching ==
He began his teaching career at the University of Portland 1968–72 as an instructor, becoming an assistant professor of creative writing. He was assistant professor of creative writing at Ohio University 1972–73, the University of Pittsburgh 1973–76, and University of Iowa, Iowa City, 1976–77. At the University of Arizona he served as associate professor from 1978 until his retirement. In February 2008 they held a tribute reading.

Poets who studied under Anderson include Agha Shahid Ali, Michael Collier, Stuart Dischell, Loren Goodman, Tony Hoagland, Peter Oresick, David Rivard, and David Wojahn.

== Personal life ==
He married Nancy Garland in 1964; married his second wife, Linda Baker, in 1967; and married third wife, Barbara Hershkowitz in 1971, with whom he had one son, Bodi Orlen Anderson.

== Death ==
Anderson died on October 20, 2007, in Tucson, Arizona, after several weeks of illness. He was cremated and his ashes spread, according to his wishes, in the woods outside of Flagstaff, Arizona.

== Sources ==
Contemporary Authors Online. The Gale Group, 2002. PEN (Permanent Entry Number): 0000002170.
