= Pitt Poetry Series =

List of contemporary American poetry

The Pitt Poetry Series, published by the University of Pittsburgh Press in Pittsburgh, Pennsylvania, USA, is one of the largest and best known lists of contemporary American poetry.

== History ==
The Pitt Poetry Series was established in 1968 by press director Frederick A. Hetzel and press editor Paul Zimmer. The Series received initial funding through the A. W. Mellon Educational and Charitable Trust and its president Theodore L. Hazlett, via the agency of the International Poetry Forum and its director, Samuel Hazo. From the mid-1970s to the present many volumes have been supported by the National Endowment for the Arts and the Pennsylvania Council on the Arts.

During its entire history the Pitt Poetry Series has had several general editors: Paul Zimmer (1968-1978), Ed Ochester (1979-2021), Terrance Hayes (2021 to the present).

== Poets ==
Poets in the Pitt Series include Sharon Olds, Billy Collins, Ted Kooser, Lawrence Joseph, Jon Anderson, Richard Shelton, Larry Levis, Robert Louthan, Jim Daniels, Michael S. Harper, Tomas Tranströmer, John Balaban, Norman Dubie, Archibald MacLeish, Odysseus Elytis, Gary Soto, Stuart Dybek, Kathleen Norris, Alicia Ostriker, Toi Derricotte, and David Wojahn.

== Agnes Lynch Starrett Poetry Prize ==
The Pitt Series annually awards a prize for a first book, the Agnes Lynch Starrett Poetry Prize.
