= Robert Louthan =

American poet (born 1951)

- Born: 1951 (age 74–75)
- Education: Goddard College
- Occupation: Poet
- Writing career
- Genre: Poetry

Robert Louthan (born 1951) is an American poet.

== Life ==
Louthan graduated from Goddard College in 1978 with a Master of Fine Arts degree.

His work has appeared in The American Poetry Review, Antioch Review, The Paris Review, and Ploughshares.

== Awards ==
- 1978 Grolier Poetry Prize
- Bread Loaf Transatlantic Review scholarship

== Works ==
- Shrunken Planets. Alice James Books. 1980. ISBN 978-0-914086-28-4.
- Living in Code. University of Pittsburgh Press. 1983. ISBN 978-0-8229-3483-7.

=== Anthologies ===
- Peter Oresick; Nicholas Coles, eds. (1990). "Heavy Machinery". Working classics: poems on industrial life. University of Illinois Press. p. 157. ISBN 978-0-252-06133-2.
- Michael Klein, ed. (1989). Poets for life: seventy-six poets respond to AIDS. Crown Publishers. ISBN 978-0-517-57242-9.
