= Ludvigson =

Ludvigson is a surname. Notable people with the surname include:

- Kalon Ludvigson, American trampoline gymnast
- Susan Ludvigson (born 1942), American poet
- Sydney C. Ludvigson, American economist
