= Irene McKinney =

American poet (1939–2012)

- Born: April 20, 1939 Belington, West Virginia, U.S.
- Died: February 4, 2012 (aged 72) Barbour County, West Virginia, U.S.
- Occupation: Poet
- Education: West Virginia Wesleyan College (BA); West Virginia University (MA); University of Utah (PhD)
- Spouse: Joe McKinney
- Children: 2
- Parents: Ralph Durrett; Celia Phares Durrett

Irene McKinney (April 20, 1939 – February 4, 2012) was an American poet and editor, and served as the Poet Laureate of the state of West Virginia from her appointment by Governor Gaston Caperton in January 1994 until her death.

== Biography ==
Third oldest of her parents' (Ralph Durrett and Celia Phares Durrett) six children, Irene McKinney was born and grew up in Belington, Barbour County, WV on a 300-acre farm that had been in her family for generations. She had five siblings (two older siblings named Harold Durrett and Eleanor Leary and three younger siblings named Ralph Waldo Durrett, Janet Stonerook and Eileen Martin). Her family grew most of their food on their farm due to the struggle of living on one income and having to feed eight mouths in the house.

She attended a one-room school, Concord School, for first through fifth grades. McKinney recalls that her second grade teacher, Mrs. Teeter, recognized and encouraged her by giving her a double promotion from second to fourth grade. From a young age, her father Ralph Durrett, a schoolteacher, read her works by Ralph Waldo Emerson, William Wordsworth, Edgar Allan Poe, and Pinocchio.

Irene graduated Belington High School in 1956 married her high school boyfriend Joe McKinney. They later had two children named Julia Vickers nee McKinney and Paul McKinney. Initially a stay-at-home mom, her interest in poetry and literature was piqued when she discovered that the library in Buckhannon (Buckhannon Public Library) where she lived had a lot of books that she was really interested in learning from. Through this activity, she became highly influenced by the likes of Emily Dickinson and Sylvia Plath.

Her husband supported her and their two children when she began taking classes at Wesleyan College in Buckhannon, WV. She received her B.A. in English Literature at West Virginia Wesleyan College in 1968, her M.A. at West Virginia University in 1970 and her PhD in English literature with a doctorate in creative writing from the University of Utah in 1980.

She later got a fellowship from West Virginia University for her work and was also one of the first students to complete a creative thesis at WV University. Her dissertation was her first poetry collection, Room for the Wakers. McKinney was also the protégé of and editor for Louise McNeill, fellow poet and the predecessor to the Poet Laureate position for West Virginia from 1979 to her death in 1993. Irene helped edit for her and her friendship and relationship with Louise helped her move towards focusing on regionalism (focusing on local dialect, customs, and other features for a specific region) in her writing and poems. McKinney's poetry is steeped in the rural Appalachian landscape and frequently explores the connections between people and place. Though she retired in 2000, she was still active and continued to teach at Wesleyan College.

During the last two years of her life, McKinney dedicated herself to fulfilling her dream of creating a program at West Virginia Wesleyan College which situated “good writing [as] the center of a community, with its roots in the region of the writers [while] also being able to reference the outside world”. She developed the Low-Residency MFA (Master of Fine Arts) Program at West Virginia Wesleyan College, a contribution it later honored by establishing the Irene McKinney Award for West Virginia Wesleyan MFA Students and the McKinney Postgraduate Teaching Fellowship, which offers an MFA program graduate the opportunity to gain experience in teaching under the mentorship of experienced faculty members.

She died of cancer at the family home in Barbour County at the age of 72.

McKinney was proud of her West Virginia rural heritage, which she constantly referenced in her poetry. She said, "When people say this state is backward, I simply am astounded. I had access to a farm community, a small peaceful town and school and good, dedicated teachers. I was in nature and in literature--a perfect combination for a writer". She also said, "I'm a hillbilly, a woman, and a poet and I realized early on that nobody was going to listen to anything I had to say, so I might as well just say whatever I wanted to".

== Teaching ==
As a teacher, she taught at West Virginia Wesleyan College (Professor Emeritus - from 1971 until she went to complete her Master's and then she came back in 1991 as a professor of English and director of creative writing), Buckhannon-Upshur High School (she taught now well-known novelist Jayne Anne Phillips), Western Washington University, UC Santa Cruz, Hamilton College, Potomac State College, University of Utah, and Huttonsville Correctional Center.

She was also a Writer-in-Residence at UC Santa Cruz, Western Washington University at Bellingham, University of New Mexico at Albuquerque, Hamilton College, Lynchburg College, Alderson-Broaddus College (visiting writer-in-residence), and University of Kerala, India.

She was also a Poet-in-Residence at West Virginia Commission of the Arts.

== Awards ==
She was awarded residencies at The Bread Loaf Writers' Conference, The Utah Arts Council, Kentucky Foundation for Women, West Virginia Center for the Creative Arts, Blue Mountain Center, and Potomac State College of West Virginia University named her a 2005 Whitmore-Gates Scholar.

She was also awarded/granted fellowships at MacDowell Colony in 1982 and 1995, and at the National Endowment for the Arts in 1986 for Creative Writing.

As for individual awards, she received The Utah Arts Council Prize Award in Fiction, The Breadloaf Scholarship, Cincinnati Review Annual Poetry Prize, Kentucky Foundation for Women Award, and the Appalachian Mellon Scholarship.

== Poetry collections ==
- Room for the Wakers
- The Girl With the Stone in Her Lap (North Atlantic Books, 1976)
- The Wasps at the Blue Hexagons (Small Plot Press, 1984)
- Quick Fire and Slow Fire (North Atlantic Books, 1988)
- Six O'Clock Mine Report (University of Pittsburgh Press, 1989)
- Vivid Companion (Vandalia Press, 2004)
- Unthinkable: Selected Poems 1976-2004 (Red Hen Press, 2009)

== As editor ==
- Backcountry: Contemporary Writing in West Virginia (Editor, Vandalia Press, 2002)
- Cofounder of Trellis, a West Virginia Poetry Journal, with fellow Appalachian Poet Maggie Anderson and Winston Fuller in 1971 (she worked on it from 1973 - 1979).
- Assistant Editor for Quarterly West, an American literary magazine at the University of Utah
