= Lynda Hull =

American poet (1954–1994)

Lynda Hull (December 5, 1954 – March 29, 1994) was an American poet. She had published two collections of poetry when she died in a car accident in 1994. A third, The Only World (Harper Perennial, 1995), was published posthumously by her husband, the poet David Wojahn, and was a finalist for the 1994 National Book Critics Circle Award. Collected Poems By Lynda Hull (Graywolf Press), was published in 2006.

Hull was the recipient of fellowships from the National Endowment for the Arts and the Illinois Arts Council, and received four Pushcart Prizes. Her poems were published widely in literary journals and magazines including The New Yorker, AGNI, Colorado Review, The Kenyon Review, The Iowa Review, Ploughshares, and Poetry.

Hull was born and grew up in Newark, New Jersey. At the age of 16 she won a scholarship to Princeton University, but ran away from home. During the next ten years she struggled with heroin addiction on and off and lived in many places including various Chinatowns following a marriage to an immigrant from Shanghai. In the early 1980s Hull started studying at the University of Arkansas at Little Rock and earned her B.A., and then her M.A. from Johns Hopkins University. She also reconnected with her family during this time and met the poet David Wojahn, whom she married in 1984.

She taught English at Indiana University, De Paul University, and in the MFA in Writing program at Vermont College of Fine Arts. She served as a poetry editor for the literary journal Crazyhorse, which offers an annual award in her honor, the Lynda Hull Memorial Poetry Prize.

== Literary influences and praise ==
In his review of her Collected Poems, Craig Morgan Teicher described Hull's poetry as, "lush, intensely lyrical evocations of the underbelly of American urban life, driven by a sense of inevitable loss and degradation but also by a powerful attachment to momentary beauty." In a 2008 interview with Gulf Coast, David Wojahn said of her study and work, "She steeped herself in the Romantics, especially Keats and Shelley, and she knew Hart Crane almost by heart. I'm still in awe of that acuity, and of how she used it to do honor to a broken world, post-apocalyptic, filled with ruins and ruined lives. And she gave such dignity to that landscape and those lives. She really did have an incredible lyric gift, one that no other poet of my generation possessed." Poet David St. John wrote that "Of all the poets of my generation, Lynda Hull remains the most heartbreaking, merciful, and consoling."

== Awards and honors ==
- 1991 Carl Sandburg Award for Star Ledger
- 1990 Edwin Ford Piper Award for Star Ledger
- 1989 NEA Literature Fellowship in Poetry
- 1986 Juniper Prize for Ghost Money

== Books ==
- Collected Poems By Lynda Hull (Graywolf Press, 2006)
- The Only World (Harper Perennial, 1995)
- Star Ledger (University of Iowa Press, 1991)
- Ghost Money (University of Massachusetts Press, 1986)

=== Anthologies ===
- Best American Poetry 1992,
- Last Call: Poems on Alcoholism, Addiction and Deliverance (Sarabande Books, 1997)
- New American Poets of the 90's (David R. Godine, 1991)
- Under 35 the New Generation of American Poets, Nicholas Christopher, Editor; Anchor Press, c. 1989

== Sources ==
- The Academy of American Poets Biographical Entry
