= Warhol-o-rama =

Warhol-o-rama: a serial portrait of the serial portrait pioneer
- Author: Peter Oresick
- Language: English
- Subject: Andy Warhol
- Genre: Poetry
- Publisher: Carnegie Mellon University Press
- Publication date: 6 August 2008
- Publication place: United States
- Media type: Print (paperback)
- Pages: 104
- ISBN: 978-0-88748-503-9
- OCLC: 233543471

Warhol-o-rama is a book of American poetry that examines the life—and robust afterlife—of the artist Andy Warhol (1928–1987).

A poetic sequence by Peter Oresick, it employs techniques of multiple perspective and Warholian parody and appropriation, often to humorous effect. The sequence draws heavily from source material in the archives of the Andy Warhol Museum as well as a large body of mythology surrounding the pop art icon to render a postmodern serial portrait of Warhol.

The book was published on 6 August 2008, the occasion of Andy Warhol's 80th birthday, by the university press at Carnegie Mellon University, of which Warhol was an alumnus.

"We Pittsburghers are a little proud of Andy, a little ashamed. I had the privilege of eating ice-cream cones with him and driving him to the train station in 1949, so I can attest to the incredible knowledge and accuracy of Oresick's poems; but I'd also like to attest to their wit, originality, and loveliness. It's déjà Warhol all over again".

Gerald Stern

== See also ==
- Songs for Drella
