= Living Up the Street =

Book by Gary Soto

First edition

Living up the Street is a book written by Gary Soto. It was published in 1985. The book is a collection of short stories, recollections of growing up Chicano in Fresno, California. It won a Before Columbus Foundation's American Book Award in 1985.

In these "narrative recollections" poet Gary Soto reflects on his Mexican American childhood in the ethnically mixed laboring-class neighborhoods of Fresno, California. His was a life lived at the margins—economic margins and cultural margins. In these recollections of family relationships, youthful mischief-making, farm and factory jobs, adolescent rebellion, and the transition to professional writing Soto subtly and humorously draws attention to the discontinuities between the lives of Chicanos and Anglos.

== Stories ==
"The Beauty Contest" describes how young Gary entered his younger half-brother in a playground beauty contest. "Strong build, a chipped tooth, half Mexican and half white--he might win, I thought." (43) Gary knows that only a lighter complexioned child could meet the Anglo standards of beauty that prevail. In fact, he has internalized those standards himself: " . . . we were awed by the blond and fair skinned kids in good clothes. They looked beautiful, I thought." We are led to infer that the Anglo contestants come from a world of comfort and parental attentiveness whereas Gary has been left on his own to tend to his brother while his parents are away at their work of manual labor.

In "Looking for Work" Gary wanted to imitate the Anglo families in the television programs that he continually watched. He tried to convince his siblings to wear shoes to dinner and improve their appearance so that "white people would like us more." (26) In "1,2,3," Soto reconstructs the shocking vindictiveness of an Anglo father after his young daughter falls off of a swing that is being pushed by Gary's Chicana friend, Rosie. Soto ends this piece, "I wanted to . . . explain that it was a mistake; that we also fell from the swings and the bars and got hurt . . . ." (15)

Soto foregrounds violence as an integral part of his childhood. The lead-off sketch, "Being Mean," recounts childhood pranks involving the setting of fires and abuse of pets. But this violence also included and was a response to verbal violence from others, such as being called "dirty Mexicans." (3) "Bloodworth" chronicles the evolution from fisticuffs--"all through elementary and junior high school, it was bob and weave, jab and stick" (95)--to the more controlled violence of the high school wrestling team.

Soto tells of his back-breaking farm laboring and factory jobs in "One Last Time" and "Black Hair." There is no romance in these episodes, "no grace" (124) in the miserable conditions, and no comfort. Rather, there is always the fear he will forever have to "work Mexican hours, and in the end die a Mexican death, broke and in despair." (123)

Gary is the main character who lives in Fresno in 1957. He has an older brother and younger sister. His mom works most of the times and the dad just died at work which devastated Gary. Gary has his normal life as a child like going to school, playing in an alley, playing baseball and working. Gary always has a crush on a girl and has to act cool but always screws it up. Gary later runs away where he goes to a small town and work. He finds a job that refurbishes and sells tires and is hired. He has two other friends who work there a lot and one night stole goods from one of his friends family but immediately is filled with guilt. He returns the goods he stole and buys a bus ticket but while on the bus, he doesn't want to leave so he refunds to stay with the gang.

== Reception ==
Chris Watson, writing for the Santa Cruz Sentinel, thought that while specific to Soto's experiences, many of the stories would be familiar to many people's childhoods. He also was complementary of the writing thinking the book's style was "simple, detailed and totally lacking in pedantry". The San Francisco Examiner's Sandor Weiner similarly opined that the work showed that "Soto is a talented writer, who cares deeply for his craft".
