= Stuart Dischell =

American poet (born 1954)

Stuart Dischell (born May 29, 1954 in Atlantic City, New Jersey) is an American poet and Professor in English Creative Writing in the Master of Fine Arts Program at the University of North Carolina at Greensboro.

== Career ==
Stuart Dischell studied Literature at Antioch College and received his Master of Fine Arts degree at the Writers workshop of the University of Iowa, where he studied poetry with Donald Justice, Stanley Plumly and Jon Anderson. After graduating Iowa, he moved to Cambridge, Massachusetts and taught at Boston University. Since 1992, he has taught Creative Writing in the Master of Fine Arts Program at the University of North Carolina at Greensboro. He also taught in the Sarah Lawrence Summer Literary Seminars and in the Low Residency MFA Program for Writers at Warren Wilson College.

== Publications ==
- Animate Earth (Limited edition), Jeanne Duvall Editions, 1988
- Good Hope Road (National Poetry Series), Viking Books, 1993
- Evening and Avenues, Penguin Books, 1996
- Dig Safe Penguin Books, 2003
- Backwards Days, Penguin Books, 2007
- Touch Monkey, Forklift Ink., 2013
- Standing on Z, Unicorn Press, 2016
- Children with Enemies, University Of Chicago Press, 2017
- The lookout man, University Of Chicago Press, 2022

Stuart Dischell has also been published in anthologies like Essential Pleasures: A New Anthology of Poems to Read Aloud, Hammer and Blaze: A Gathering of Contemporary American Poets The Pushcart prize, XIX, 1994-1995: best of the small presses, and Good Poems and in various media such as The Atlantic, New Republic, Agni, From the Fishouse, Ploughshares, Slate, The Kenyon Review and the Alaska Quarterly Review.

== Awards and honors ==
- National Poetry Series Award, 1991
- Pushcart Prize, 1994
- National Endowment for the Arts Fellowship, 1996
- North Carolina Arts Fellowship, 2001
- John Simon Guggenheim Memorial Foundation Fellowship, 2004
- National Endowment for the Arts Fellowship, 2008.
