= Jim Powell (poet) =

American poet

Jim Powell is an American poet, translator, and classicist from the San Francisco Bay Area.

== Career ==
Powell's poetry of 1977-2007 is collected in It Was Fever That Made The World (1989) and Substrate (2009). He has translated the poetry of Sappho (1993, rev. 2007 and 2019) and selections from other ancient Greek and Latin lyric poets, and published essays and reviews. Thom Gunn and Robert Duncan were teachers, mentors and friends; he was a member of Duncan's Homer Group. He was poet-in-residence at Reed College (1988–90), a graduate student instructor at University of California, Berkeley (1981-1987), a MacArthur Fellow (1993–98), the Sherry Poet at the University of Chicago (2005), and 2014 recipient of the Oscar Williams and Gene Derwood Award for Poetry.

== Publications ==
- The Poetry of Sappho (2019, new & expanded edition)
- Substrate (2009)
- The Poetry Of Sappho (2007)
- "To Sea Again, Dear Ship" (Common Knowledge 2007, 10 translations)
- Catullan Revenants (2001 chapbook)
- California Blue Indian Ghost Dance (2000 chapbook)
- A Victorian Connoisseur Of Sunsets (1999 chapbook)
- Sappho: A Garland (1993)
- It Was Fever That Made the World (1989)
- "The Recovery of the Creaturely World" (Threepenny Review 2014, on Lawrence's poetry)
- "The Eternal Ones of the Dream" (Threepenny Review 2012, on Duncan's H.D. Book)
- "Wendell Berry: Light in Darkness" (Threepenny Review 2011)
- "Poetry Without Imposture" (Threepenny Review, 2008, on Thom Gunn)
- "Reading The Canon" (Kean Review 2007)
- "Poetry And Second Thoughts" (TriQuarterly 1993)
- "In The Waiting Room" (TriQuarterly 1991)
- "Basil Bunting and Mina Loy" (Chicago Review 1990)
- "William Everson (Brother Antoninus") (Beat Generation Writers, Dictionary of Literary Biography)
- "Rope Of Twined Lifetimes: The Poetry Of John Peck" (Occident 1980)
- "The Light Of Vers Libre" (Paideuma 1979, on Pound's metric)
