= Nina Živančević =

- Born: January 30, 1957 (age 69); Belgrade, Yugoslavia

Nina Živančević (born 1957) is a Serbian-born poet, playwright, fiction writer, translator, scholar, performer, curator and art critic. She apprenticed as a young poet with Allen Ginsberg and has gone on to work in various capacities as both a writer and scholar of experimental, underground and avant-garde literature.

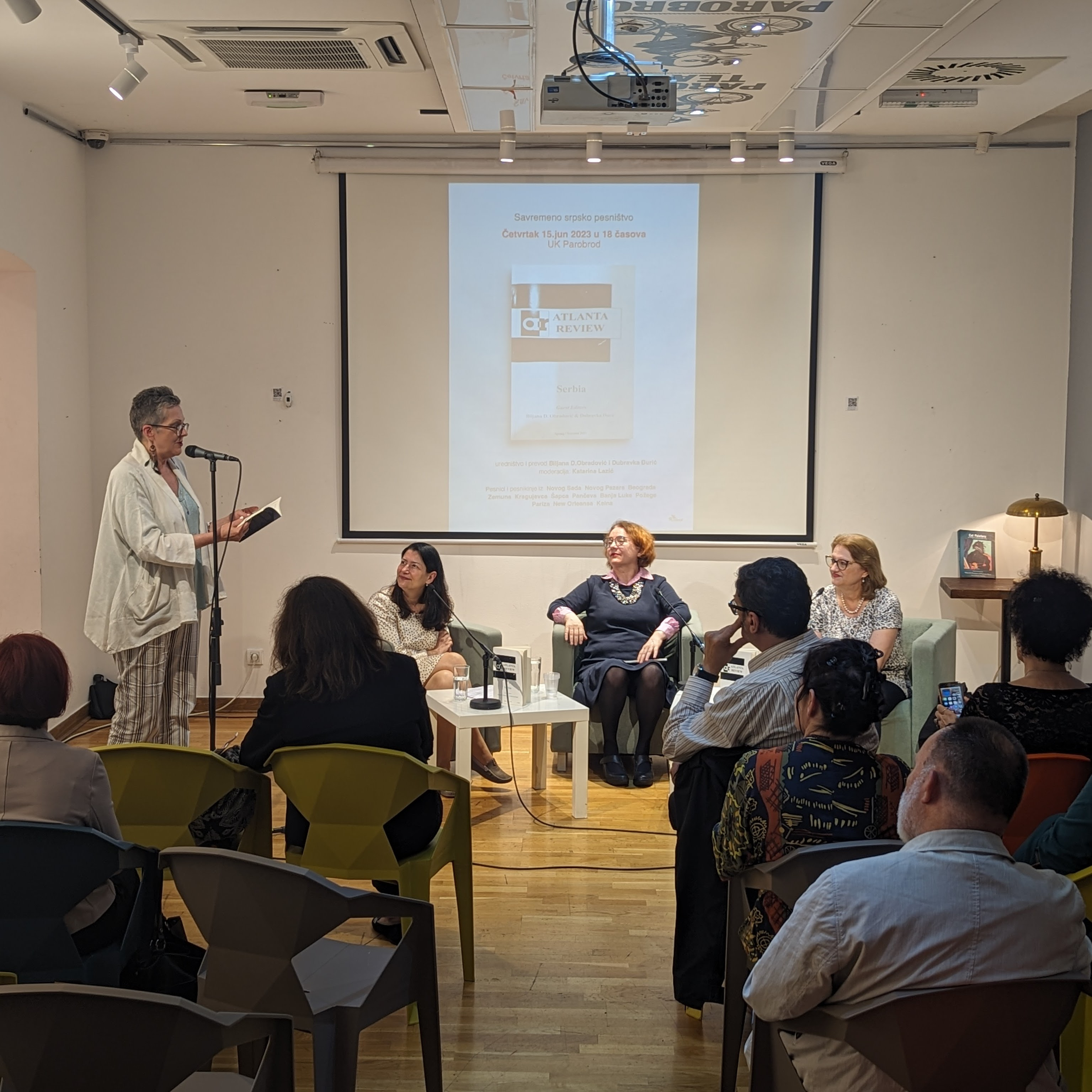
Nina Živančević reading her poetry at UK Parobrod in Belgrade, June 2023

== Biography ==
Živančević published her first book in 1982 for which she won the National Award for poetry in Yugoslavia. From 1980 to 1981 she worked as a teaching assistant and secretary to Allen Ginsberg. She worked as a literary editor for East Village Eye and Theater X, as a freelance journalist for Politika, El Pais, L'Unita, Woman (Spain), and Nexus, and as a contributor to The New Yorker and New York Arts Magazine. Besides having performed with The Living Theater (1988-1992) and La Mama Experimental Theatre Club, she co-founded in 1988 the Odiyana Theatre. She is author of more than twenty books and has translated notable works of poetry into Serbian. In 2001 she completed her PhD in Comparative Literature and Slavic Studies at Université Nancy 2 with a thesis on the modernist literature of Serbian writer Miloš Crnjanski. That same year she contributed the text 'Pandora's Box' to the Semiotext(e) reader Hatred of Capitalism, in which she addresses the war in Yugoslavia, and in relation to which she worked in 1996 as an official Serbian, Croatian and Bosnian translator for the International Tribunal for War Crimes in the Hague. In 2002 she received a Special Grant from the American PEN association of writers presided by Robert Creeley. Živančević is the winner of the 2021 Centre National du Livre grant for creative writing (poetry domain) for a project titled “The Source of Light". She presently serves on the editorial committee of the journal Au Sud de l'Est. She lives in Paris and teaches languages and the theatre of the avant-gardes at Paris University.

== Quotes ==
Johny Brown, the English poet and playwright, said: "Nina is Serbia's true Punk Laureate. Nina stands over the mike stand. She reads in Serbian but the hairs on the back of my neck stand up. Every face in the room, all the generations, all the clans, every subculture representative, is trained on her... Nina pushes her words way beyond Acker and Ginsberg to a place all her own. The punk metaphysicist! Other civilisations and their attendant cultures seep through the city walls of her poems. Faded brocade ruffles hang from under the sleeves of cracked black leather jackets."

== Published works ==
- Poems (1982)
- Growing Bridges (1984)
- Gledajuci Knjige Nezavisnih, Narodna Knjiga (1985)
- More or Less Urgent (1988)
- Recherche Philippe Sollers (1992)
- I Was a War Reporter in Egypt (1992)
- Inside and Out of Byzantium (1994)
- Byzantine Stories (1995)
- Poet's Diwan (1995)
- Minotaur and the Maze (1996)
- Vendors of Dreams (2000)
- As I Said Before (2002)
- Death of New York City (2002)
- Orpheus: Return (2003)
- Letter Pi (2004)
- The End of Century (2006)
- Milosh Crnjanski, La Serbie, l'exil, le retour (2007)
- Iznenadni Blesak (2009)
- Sous le signe de Cyber-Cybèle (2009)
- Onze Femmes: Artistes, Slaves et Nomades (2011)
- Isceljenje, Mali Nemo (2012)
- Crnjanski i njegov citalac, Mali Nemo (2012)
- L'Amour n'est qu'un mot (2013)
- Living on Air (2014)
- Letters to Myself (2014)
- Sonnets En Avion (2015)
- Ono što se pamti (2017)
- Notes en patins à roulettes (2020)
- Veštačka inteligencija i prirodna glupost (2021)
- Roller-Skating Notes (2021)
- La Source de lumière (2021)
- Nomadkinje (2022)
- Ono što se vidi (2022)
- Jedini izvor svetlosti (2023)
- Smrti (2023)
- New York City Jail & Other Stories (2023)

=== Translations ===
- Rumi: Poems (1980)
- Kabir: Poems (1980)
- Lao Tzu: Tao Te Ching (1981)
- Walter Abish: How German Is It? (1987)
- Charles Bukowski: Notes on Ordinary Madness (1985)
- Kathy Acker: Great Expectations (1986)
- Lynne Tillman: Haunted Houses (1990)
- Chris Kraus: Aliens and Anorexia (2000)
- Julia Kristeva: Selected Interviews (2003)
- Simone Weil: Gravity and Grace (2007)
- Jean-Pierre Faye:Izgubljeno nađeno(2020)
