= Susan Ludvigson =

American poet (born 1942)

- Ludvigson with cat, 1987
- Born: February 13, 1942 (age 84); Rice Lake, Wisconsin, U.S.
- Education: University of Wisconsin–River Falls (baccalaureate); University of North Carolina at Charlotte (MA)
- Occupation: Poet
- Spouse: David Bartels (m. 1961; div. 1974) Scott Ely (m. 1988; died 2013)
- Writing career
- Years active: 1974–present
- Genre: Poetry
- Notable awards: Guggenheim Fellowship (1983)

Susan Gayle Ludvigson (born February 13, 1942) is an American poet. A 1983 Guggenheim Fellow, she has written more than half a dozen poetry volumes. She is also a professor emeritus at Winthrop University.

== Biography ==
Susan Gayle Ludvigson was born on February 13, 1942, in Rice Lake, Wisconsin. Of Norwegian-American and Swedish-American descent, she was the first-born of Mabel Helgeland and Howard C. Ludvigson, her father being a cafe owner and horse breeder. She obtained a bachelor's degree (Note: Sources conflict on whether it is specifically a Bachelor of Arts degree with honors or a Bachelor of Science degree.) in English and psychology from University of Wisconsin–River Falls in 1965.

Ludvigson taught English at public schools in River Falls, Wisconsin (1965-1968) and Ann Arbor, Michigan (1968-1971). She later attended University of North Carolina at Charlotte (where she got an MA in Education in 1973) and worked as a mental health educator in Mecklenburg County, North Carolina (1972-1973). She attended the University of South Carolina under James Dickey, spending two years there.

Ludvigson had been writing poems since childhood, but was initially disinterested in a career. However, she dealt with problems in her first marriage with therapy poems, and became inspired to write them by seeing Donald Hall read Galway Kinnell's "The Bear". After moving to Charlotte and joining several writers from the Charlotte Writers Club in 1972, she released her first poetry volume Step Carefully in Night Grass in 1974, winning the North Carolina Poetry Council's 1975 Oscar Arnold Young Memorial Award for that book. She became an assistant professor of English at Winthrop College in 1975.

In 1980, Ludvigson received a MacDowell Fellowship in Literature. In 1981, she published another poetry volume, Northern Lights, and she was promoted to associate professor at Winthrop. In 1983, she was awarded a Guggenheim Fellowship in poetry, for which she planned to travel to Scandinavia; she stated that her intent was to "understand how Scandinavian Americans I grew up with, and am, got to be the way they are". After three of her friends died in three successive years, she wrote The Swimmer, a small volume where she "attempt[s] to come to terms with death and other losses"; it was released in 1984.

In 1986, Ludvigson released Defining the Holy, her first poetry book since her return from her European trip. That same year, she published The Beautiful Noon of No Shadow, a three-part volume centered on the idea of change. She later released To Find the Gold (1990) where she addresses several aspects of art, including the life of sculptor Camille Claudel and her own art career, and Everything Winged Must Be Dreaming (1993), where she uses flight as a prominent motif. She also recorded an hour of poetry at the Library of Congress.

Ludvigson released Trinity (1996), which has the first of its three sections written in terza rima, and Sweet Confluence (2000), a collection of previous Ludvigson poems. She appeared in a 2000 International Poetry Forum reading with Sherod Santos, with Bob Hoover of the Pittsburgh Post-Gazette calling them "practitioners of the narrative poem [who] brought to the evening's reading a collection packed with vivid descriptions, compelling stories and a clear, powerful style". In 2006, she published another volume, Escaping the House of Certainty, where she addresses the intersection of human identity and physical reality. In April 2009, she was elected to the South Carolina Academy of Authors. She won the 2014 Five Points James Dickey Prize for Poetry.

According to poet and professor of English Ken Autrey, some of Ludvigson's poetry volumes use themes such as grief, memories, dreams, and relationships. Ludvigson explained in a 2002 interview with the Centre Daily Times that many of her poems are centered on her family and childhood. Professor of English Judy Jo Small describes Ludvigson as "a Romantic quester in a postmodern era [who] writes as a woman searching for wider, deeper experience of herself and her world". Author Michael J. Bugeja, writing in the Writer's Digest, said that "Ludvigson is known for her ability to re-create entire worlds out of the clay of language". Meanwhile, poet Jeff Gundy said that her poetry tends to be free verse.

Ludvigson married speech and hearing therapist David Bartels in 1961; the couple had one son before their divorce in 1974. On October 28, 1988, she married Scott Ely, a novelist who also taught at Winthrop, in Puivert, France; they were married until his death in 2013. She lives in Rock Hill, South Carolina.

== Works ==
- Step Carefully in Night Grass (1974) (Note: Reviews of this book:)
- Northern Lights (1981) (Note: Reviews of this book:)
- The Swimmer (1984) (Note: Reviews of this book:)
- The Beautiful Noon of No Shadow (1986) (Note: Reviews of this book:)
- Defining the Holy (1986)
- To Find the Gold (1990) (Note: Reviews of this book:)
- Everything Winged Must Be Dreaming (1993) (Note: Reviews of this book:)
- Trinity (1996)
- Sweet Confluence (2000) (Note: Reviews of this book:)
- Escaping the House of Certainty (2006) (Note: Reviews of this book:)
