= Paul Zimmer (poet) =

American poet, and editor (born 1934)

- Born: September 18, 1934 (age 91); Canton, Ohio, U.S.
- Education: Kent State University
- Occupation: Poet

Paul Zimmer (born 1934 in Canton, Ohio) is an American poet, and editor.

== Life ==
He flunked out of college, and worked in a steel mill. From 1954 to 1955 Zimmer served in the United States Army as a journalist. The Ribs of Death, his first book, was published in 1968. He received a Bachelor of Arts and Science degree from Kent State University in 1968.

He has directed the university presses at Georgia, Iowa, and Pittsburgh, and helped found the Pitt Poetry Series. His papers are held at Kent State.

== Awards ==
- Open Book Award from the American Society of Journalists and Authors
- American Academy and Institute of Arts and Letters
- 1998 National Poetry Series, for The Great Bird of Love
- Distinguished Alumni Award from the College of Arts and Sciences at Kent State University in 2004.
- Two NEA fellowships
- Helen Bullis Memorial Award
- Two Pushcart Prizes
- An Ohioana Award in 2005

== Works ==
- The Ribs of Death, October House, 1967
- The Republic of Many Voices, October House, 1969
- A Seed in the Wind, Three Rivers Press, C.M.U., 1975
- The Zimmer Poems. Dryad Press. 1976. ISBN 978-0-931848-16-2.
- With Wanda: Town and Country Poems. Dryad Press. 1980. ISBN 978-0-931848-32-2.
- Family Reunion: Selected and New Poems (1983)
- The Great Bird of Love (1989)
- Big Blue Train. University of Arkansas Press. 1993. ISBN 978-1-55728-297-2. "poet Paul Zimmer."
- Crossing Into Sunlight. University of Georgia Press. 1996. ISBN 978-0-8203-1829-5.
- Crossing to Sunlight Revisited. University of Georgia Press. 2007. ISBN 978-0-8203-2944-4.

=== Anthologies ===
- Garrison Keillor, ed. (2006). "Suck It Up". Good Poems for Hard Times. Penguin Group. ISBN 978-0-14-303767-5.
- Billy Collins, ed. (2003). Poetry 180: a turning back to poetry. Random House Trade Paperbacks. ISBN 978-0-8129-6887-3.

=== Memoir ===
- Trains in the distance. Kent State University Press. 2003. ISBN 978-0-87338-796-5.
- After the fire: a writer finds his place. University of Minnesota Press. 2002. ISBN 978-0-8166-4019-5.

== Reviews ==
It is not often that a "new and selected" documents the progressions, departures, and returns of a writer's consciousness as lucidly and profoundly as Paul Zimmer's Crossing to Sunlight Revisited (the long-awaited sequel to 1996's Crossing to Sunlight: Selected Poems). Zimmer's newer poems are at the start of the book; they chronicle his ascension into, what seems to be, comfortable old age. Note that "old" is not my word here; in fact, in his preface, Zimmer informs us that he is "no longer an aging poet or an older poet." He says, "I am an old poet."
