= Larry Levis =

American poet and teacher

- Born: Larry Patrick Levis; September 30, 1946; Fresno, California
- Died: May 8, 1996 (aged 49); Richmond, Virginia
- Education: Fresno State College (BA, 1968); Syracuse University (MA,1970); University of Iowa (Ph.D, 1974)
- Occupations: Poet, teacher
- Spouse: Marcia Southwick
- Children: Nicholas Levis
- Writing career
- Years active: 1972–1996
- Notable works: Winter Stars (1985); The Widening Spell of the Leaves (1992); Elegy (1997); The Darkening Trapeze (2016)
- Notable awards: National Poetry Series, Lamont Poetry Selection

Larry Patrick Levis (September 30, 1946 – May 8, 1996) was an American poet and teacher who published five books of poetry during his lifetime. Two more volumes of previously unpublished poems appeared posthumously, and received general acclaim.

== Life and work ==
=== Youth ===
Larry Levis was born in Fresno, California in 1946. He was the fourth (and youngest) child born to William Kent Levis, a grape grower, and Carol Mayo Levis.

"The young Levis grew up driving a tractor, picking grapes, and pruning vines in Selma, California, a small fruit-growing town in the San Joaquin Valley. He later wrote of the farms, the vineyards, and the Mexican migrant workers that he worked alongside. He also remembered hanging out in the local billiards parlor on Selma's East Front Street, across from the Southern Pacific Railroad tracks."

=== Education ===
Levis earned a bachelor's degree from Fresno State College in 1968, where he had studied under Philip Levine. For Levine's classes and poetry workshops, Levis completed many of the poems that would appear in his first book of poems, Wrecking Crew (1972). Levine and Levis formed a lifelong friendship that left a mark on both their writing and their art. Each continued to exchange poems for critique and consultation —either by mail or in person— during the remainder of Levis's life. Levine would edit Levis's posthumously published 1997 volume, Elegy.

Levis completed a master's degree from Syracuse University in 1970, where he studied under the guidance of poet Donald Justice. One of Levis's classmates at that time, poet Stephen Dunn, later wrote about their 1969-70 experience at Syracuse:

"We had come to study with Philip Booth, Donald Justice, W.D. Snodgrass, George P. Elliott, arguably the best group of writer-teachers that existed at the time."

Levis earned his Ph.D. from the University of Iowa in 1974. While at Iowa, he became friends with Ernesto Trejo who helped him in his study of 20th-century Spanish poetry. Also at Iowa, Levis renewed his friendship with David St. John, whom he'd first met at Fresno State in classes they took with Levine. St. John would later edit two of Levis's posthumous publications: The Selected Levis (2000), and The Darkening Trapeze (2016). In his foreword to Elegy, Levine acknowledged St. John's guidance while editing the latter volume for posthumous publication in 1997.

=== Academic career ===
Levis taught English at the University of Missouri from 1974–1980. He was co-editor of Missouri Review, from 1977 to 1980.

From 1980 to 1992, he was an associate professor at the University of Utah, where he also directed the Creative Writing Program. He was a Fulbright Lecturer in Yugoslavia in 1988.

From 1992 until his death from a heart attack in 1996, Levis was the Senior Poet and a Professor of English at Virginia Commonwealth University. During this period of time he also taught at the Warren Wilson College MFA Program for Writers.

== Awards and recognition ==
By the late 1960s, Levis had written many of the poems that would appear in his first book, Wrecking Crew (1972), which won the 1971 U. S. Award of the International Poetry Forum, and included publication in the Pitt Poetry Series by the University of Pittsburgh Press.

The Academy of American Poets named his second book, The Afterlife (1976) as a Lamont Poetry Selection. His third book of poems, The Dollmaker's Ghost, was selected by Stanley Kunitz as the winner of the Open Competition of the National Poetry Series in 1981.

Other awards included a YM-YWHA Discovery award, three fellowships in poetry from the National Endowment for the Arts, a Fulbright Fellowship, and a 1982 Guggenheim Fellowship. Levis’s poems are often included in many anthologies such as American Alphabets: 25 Contemporary Poets (2006)

== Personal life ==
Levis was married three times. He was married to his first wife, Barbara Campbell, from 1969 to 1973. His second wife was Marcia Southwick, a fellow poet, whom he married on March 15, 1975. David St. John served as best man. Together the couple had a son, Nicholas Southwick Levis (b.1978). They were together until the early 1980s, and their marriage eventually ended in divorce. Southwick later married Murray Gell-Mann, the Nobel Prize-winning physicist, in 1992. Levis was married to his third wife, Mary Jane Hale, from 1989 to 1990.

Despite his professional and artistic acclaim, Levis struggled with depression and alcohol and drug use throughout his life. The 2016 documentary film about Levis, A Late Style of Fire, explores in part the "risks and sacrifices that are necessary to live the life of an artist." The film shows Levis constantly wrestling with the "dark side" of artistic creation. This included various self-destructive and "bad boy" impulses.

=== Death ===
Levis died of cardiac arrest triggered by a drug overdose, in Richmond, Virginia on May 8, 1996, at the age of 49.

== Legacy ==
The Levis Reading Prize is awarded each year by the Department of English and its MFA in Creative Writing program at Virginia Commonwealth University (VCU). The prize is given annually in the name of the late Larry Levis for the best first or second book of poetry published in the previous calendar year. Essays and articles about Levis are featured each year in Blackbird, an online journal of literature and the arts published by VCU.

Two previously unpublished poems (eventually collected in The Darkening Trapeze) appeared in The Best American Poetry book series in 2014 and 2016, two decades after his death.

In 2016, a documentary film on the life and poetry of Levis was released titled A Late Style of Fire: Larry Levis, American Poet. It was produced and directed by filmmaker Michele Poulos, and co-produced with her husband, poet Gregory Donovan. Says Donovan:

"He was such a central figure for so many American poets and that continues to be true."

== Selected bibliography ==
Poetry

- Wrecking Crew (1972)
- The Afterlife (1977)
- The Dollmaker's Ghost (1981)
- Winter Stars (1985)
- The Widening Spell of the Leaves (1991)
- Elegy (1997)
- The Selected Levis (2000)
- The Darkening Trapeze: Last Poems (2016)
- Swirl & Vortex: Collected Poems (2026); edited by David St. John; Graywolf Press. ISBN 978-1-64445-371-1.

Prose

- The Gazer Within (2000)

Fiction

- Black Freckles (1992)
