= Samuel Hazo (writer) =

American writer (born 1928)

Samuel John Hazo
- Born: July 19, 1928 (age 98); Pittsburgh, Pennsylvania, U.S.
- Education: University of Notre Dame, Duquesne University, University of Pittsburgh
- Occupations: Novelist, poet, essayist, playwright, professor
- Partner: Mary Anne
- Children: Samuel Hazo
- Website: www.samhazopoet.com

Samuel John Hazo (born 19 July 1928) is a poet, playwright, fiction novelist, and the founder and director emeritus of the International Poetry Forum in Pittsburgh, Pennsylvania. He is also McAnulty Distinguished Professor of English Emeritus at Duquesne University, where he taught for forty-three years.

== Early life and education ==
Hazo was born in Pittsburgh, Pennsylvania in 1928 to refugee parents, a Lebanese mother and an Assyrian father from Jerusalem. From 1950 until 1957 Hazo served in the United States Marine Corps, completing his tour as a captain. He earned his Bachelor of Arts degree magna cum laude from the University of Notre Dame, and obtained his Master of Arts degree from Duquesne University, as well as a doctorate from the University of Pittsburgh. He and his wife, Mary Anne, have one son, Samuel Hazo Jr., who is an American composer.

== Life ==
As a young boy, Hazo's mother died and he grew closer to his brother, Robert. Although their father was alive, the pair were taken into the care of their aunt, who took on the responsibility of raising them. Their aunt held education in very high regard, and due to its importance, prioritized it when raising the boys. Hazo gives her credit for instilling in him a love for learning as well as inspiring much of his curiosity for writing.

Hazo first began writing poems during his time as an undergraduate student at the University of Notre Dame, where he originally studied law before switching to English. His first few works were written at times of random inspiration or specifically for the purpose of being recognized in literary magazines. It was not until his time as a captain in the United States Marine Corps during the time of the Korean War that he began to look back at his previous work as well as reflect on his life – a pivotal point for his work. Themes that became much more apparent in his work after that point mainly include things that Hazo considered relevant to his own life: family, Christianity, war, suffering, the absurdities of life, and the mystery of death.

== Contributions to the Poetry Community ==
Hazo is very passionate about not only literature in the many forms that he has worked in, but also specifically about poetry and its importance in the world. Speaking to the Pittsburgh-Post Gazette in 2010, Hazo argued that “[poetry] speaks to us personally and with absolute sincerity, like a private letter, and we nod and assent to the truth of it as we would to the mention of our very names." Hazo's founded the International Poetry Forum. For 43 years under Hazo's direction, the International Poetry Forum brought numerous poets to Pittsburgh in order to “demonstrate the relevance and centrality of poetry to the general public through the oral presentation of poetry”.

== Bibliography ==
=== Poetry ===
- Discovery. Sheed and Ward. 1959.
- The Quiet Wars. Sheed and Ward. 1962.
- Listen With the Eye. University of Pittsburgh Press. 1964.
- My Sons in God. University of Pittsburgh Press. 1965.
- Blood Rights. Pittsburgh: University of Pittsburgh Press. 1968.
- Twelve Poems. Self-Published. 1970.
- Once for the Last Bandit. University of Pittsburgh Press. 1972. ISBN 0822932407., finalist for the National Book Award for Poetry.
- Quartered. University of Pittsburgh Press. 1974. ISBN 0822932849.
- To Paris. New Directions. 1981. ISBN 0811207870.
- Thank a Bored Angel. New Directions. 1983. ISBN 0811208699.
- The Color of Reluctance. Dooryard Press. 1986. ISBN 0937160164.
- Nightwords. The Sheep Meadow Press. 1987. ISBN 0935296743.
- Silence Spoken Here. The Marlboro Press. 1988. ISBN 0910395381.
- The Past Won't Stay Behind You. University of Arkansas Press. 1993. ISBN 1557282803.
- Latching the Fist. Byblos. 1996.
- The Holy Surprise of Right Now. University of Arkansas Press. 1996. ISBN 9781557284273.
- As They Sail. University of Arkansas Press. 1999. ISBN 1557285675.
- Just Once. Autumn House Press. 2002. ISBN 0966941950.
- Jots Before Sleep. Kreider Printing. 2004.
- A Flight to Elsewhere. Autumn House Press. 2005. ISBN 1932870040.
- The Song of the Horse. Autumn House Press. 2008. ISBN 978-1932870213.
- Like a Man Gone Mad. Syracuse University Press. 2010. ISBN 978-0815609575.
- Sexes: The Marriage Dialogues. TriQuarterly. 2014.
- And The Time Is. Syracuse University Press. 2014.
- They Rule the World. Syracuse University Press. 2016.
- When Not Yet Is Now. Franciscan University Press. 2019. ISBN 978-0999513453.
- The Next Time We Saw Paris. Wiseblood Books. 2020. ISBN 978-1951319984.
- The Less Said, the Truer. Syracuse University Press. 2022.
- Becoming Done. Serif Press. 2023. ISBN 978-1735440477.
- The Treachery of Luck. Serif Press. 2024. ISBN 9798990910409.

=== Fiction ===
- Inscripts. Ohio University Press. 1975. ISBN 0821401998.
- The Wanton Summer Air. North Point Press. 1982. ISBN 0865470855.
- Stills. Syracuse University Press. 1998. ISBN 0815605374.
- The Time Remaining. Syracuse University Press. 2012.
- If Nobody Calls, I'm Not Home. Wiseblood Books. 2020. ISBN 978-1951319052.
- Hazo, Samuel (2022). This Part of the World: A Novel. Syracuse: Syracuse University Press.
- I Want It to Happen: Love as a Saga. Self Published. 2022.

=== Drama ===
- Until I'm Not Here Anymore!. 1992. OCLC 79884920.
- Solos. Byblos. 1994.
- Feather. 1996.
- Mano a Mano. 2001.
- Watching Fire, Watching Rain. 2006.
- Tell It to the Marines: A Play for the Time at Hand. 2015.

=== Essays and Criticism ===
- Entries from the Interior. Rook Press. 1976. ISBN 0916684121.
- Smithereened Apart: A Critique of Hart Crane. Ohio University Press. 1977. ISBN 0821403737.
- The Pittsburgh That Stays Within You. Word Association Publishers. 2017. ISBN 978-1633852198.
- The Rest is Prose. Duquesne University Press. 1990. ISBN 0820702242.
- The Power of Less: Essays on Poetry & Public Speech. Marquette University Press. 2005. ISBN 0874620139.
- Stroke of a Pen: Essays on Poetry and Other Provocations. University of Notre Dame Press. 2011. ISBN 978-0268030940.
- Outspokenly Yours,: Commentaries 1993-2016. Word Association Publishers. 2017.
- Hazo, Samuel (2017). The Feast of Icarus: Memoir and Myth. Lambing Press. ISBN 978-0997821512.
- The World within the Word. Franciscan University Press. 2018. ISBN 978-0996930574.
- Who Needs a Horse That Flies?:Essays on Poetry and Pretense. Serif Press. 2023. ISBN 978-1735440491.

=== Translations ===
- Adonis. The Blood of Adonis. University of Pittsburgh Press. 1971. ISBN 9780822932130.
- Denis de Rougemont. The Growl of Deeper Waters. University of Pittsburgh Press. 1976. ISBN 0822933152.
- Nadia Tueni. Lebanon: Twenty Poems for One Love. Byblos. 1990.
- Adonis. The Pages of Day and Night. Marlboro Press. 2000. ISBN 0810160811.

=== Other Works ===
- Hazo wrote “When the Evening Gets Down to Cigars” for the Pittsburgh-based cigar-friendly men's club, Rascals, Rogues, and Rapscallions.

== Awards and honors ==
Hazo received a Phi Beta Kappa Honorary Membership (1976), the Hazlett Award for Excellence in Literature (1986), the Forbes Medal for Outstanding Cultural Contributions to Western Pennsylvania (1987), the Pittsburgh Centre for the Arts Cultural Award (1995), the Elizabeth Kray Award for Outstanding Service to Poetry from New York University, and twelve honorary doctorates. For his collection of poems, Just Once, he received the Maurice English Poetry Award in 2003. A new collection of poems entitled A Flight To Elsewhere was published in 2005, as was a new prose collection entitled The Power of Less: Essays on Poetry And Public Speech. In 2004, he was honored with the Griffin Award for Creative Writing from the University of Notre Dame, his alma mater. A National Book Award Finalist, he was chosen the first poet laureate of the Commonwealth of Pennsylvania by Governor Robert Casey in 1993, serving in that capacity until 2003.
