= International Poetry Forum =

Cultural foundation

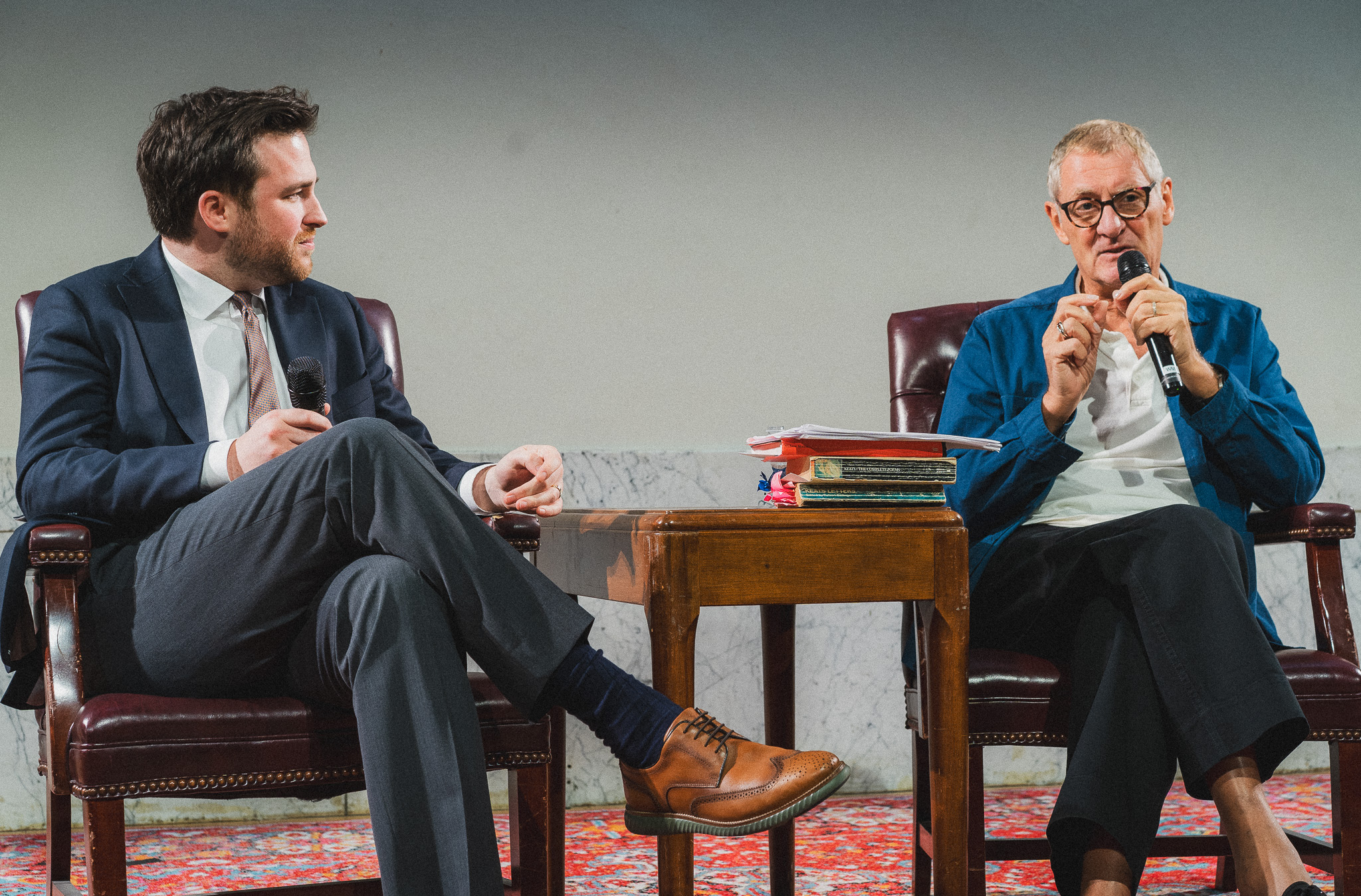
Jake Grefenstette and Sir Andrew Motion at an International Poetry Forum event in honor of John Keats

The International Poetry Forum is an independent 501(c)(3) nonprofit organization dedicated to spoken poetry and poetry education. Founded in 1966 by Samuel John Hazo in Pittsburgh, PA, the International Poetry Forum has hosted poetry readings and educational programs featuring over 800 poets and performers from more than 50 countries at Carnegie Lecture Hall, Carnegie Music Hall, Heinz Hall, and other venues in Pittsburgh. Alumni of the Forum's programs include a number of Nobel Prize laureates, Academy Award winners, U.S. Poets Laureate, National Book Award winners, Pulitzer Prize winners, and Tony Award winners. Often cited as one of the most significant poetry programs in the country, the International Poetry Forum has received the James Smithson Bicentennial Medal from the Smithsonian Institution for its contributions to the arts.

== History ==
Supported by initial funding from the Mellon Trust and Carnegie Library of Pittsburgh, the International Poetry Forum's inaugural reading featured Archibald MacLeish at Pittsburgh's Carnegie Lecture Hall on October 19, 1966. Other poets to perform at the Forum have included W.H. Auden, Jorge Luis Borges, Seamus Heaney, Mary Oliver, Octavio Paz, Elizabeth Bishop, Czesław Miłosz, Robert Penn Warren, Derek Walcott, Gwendolyn Brooks, Adonis, Donald Hall, John Berryman, Lawrence Ferlinghetti, James Merrill, Mary Karr, Dana Gioia, Richard Wilbur, Yevgeny Yevtushenko, Robert Lowell, May Swenson, Adrienne Rich, Jan Beatty, W.S. Merwin, Joseph Brodsky, John Ashbery, Denise Levertov, Tomas Tranströmer, Billy Collins, Lucille Clifton, Paul Muldoon, Edward Kamau Brathwaite, Joyce Carol Oates, Terrance Hayes, Rita Dove, and hundreds more.

In addition to poets, the Forum has hosted readings by actors such as Anthony Hopkins, Gregory Peck, Brooke Shields, Ruby Dee, Ossie Davis, Ellen Burstyn, José Ferrer, Danny Glover, and James Earl Jones; novelists such as Kurt Vonnegut, Chinua Achebe, and Saul Bellow; playwrights such as Edward Albee and Tennessee Williams; musicians such as Judy Collins, Noel Harrison, Lucinda Williams, Nana Mouskouri, and The Clancy Brothers; and public figures such as Queen Noor of Jordan and Princess Grace of Monaco.

Beyond its flagship reading series, the Forum has sponsored the publication of a number of poetry collections and founded the Poets in Person outreach program, which has sent authors and educators such as Fred Rogers and Samuel Pickering to speak at schools across Western Pennsylvania. Although most of its events are in Pittsburgh, the Forum has also presented performances at venues including the Wolf Trap National Park for the Performing Arts and the Smithsonian Institution's Hirshhorn Museum in Washington, D.C.

In 2023, after a decade-long hiatus, Samuel Hazo announced the revival of the Forum's public reading series, naming local academic Jake Grefenstette as his successor. Grefenstette has since relaunched the Forum's readings and educational programs and developed one of the world's most widely followed platforms for online educational poetry videos on social media. Events under Grefenstette's tenure have included readings by a number of new and returning poets and performers, including the world premiere of Poet Laureate of the United Kingdom Simon Armitage's verse translation of the Epic of Gilgamesh. As a 501(c)(3) nonprofit organization, the International Poetry Forum is primarily supported by foundation grants and individual donations.

== Legacy ==
In 1967, the University of Pittsburgh Press launched the Pitt Poetry Series in collaboration with the International Poetry Forum as a platform for publishing winning manuscripts of the Forum's United States Award, which was awarded from 1967–1976. In 1978, the Forum launched its own Byblos Editions imprint, which has published collections by Vicente Aleixandre, William Jay Smith, Adonis, and others.

Samuel Hazo, who served as the Forum's founder and director for 43 years, was named Pennsylvania’s first Poet Laureate in 1993, a position he served for a decade. For his work directing the Forum, Hazo received honorary doctorates from institutions such as the University of Notre Dame and Carnegie Mellon University; the Hazlett Award for Excellence in Literature from the Pennsylvania Governor; the Forbes Medal for Outstanding Cultural Contributions to Western Pennsylvania; and the Common Wealth Award of Distinguished Service.

In January 2023, Carlow University presented “The Power of Poetry: Celebrating the Legacy of the International Poetry Forum,” a public event featuring poetry readings by Samuel Hazo, Naomi Shihab Nye, Richard Blanco, and Tracy K. Smith.

After his retirement, Hazo established an archival collection at Carlow covering his tenure as director. Audio recordings for the Forum's 1966–2009 poetry readings have since been digitized, donated, and made available through the International Poetry Forum Collection at Carlow’s Grace Library. Recordings from the Grefenstette administration are publicly available on the International Poetry Forum's own YouTube and social media channels.
