= Nicholas Coles =

Nicholas Joe Howard Coles (born Nov. 11, 1947 in Leeds, England) is a British-American scholar in working-class literature and composition studies, and is Professor Emeritus of English at the University of Pittsburgh.

== Life ==
He holds BA and MA degrees from Oxford University (Coles was educated at Balliol College, where he was awarded a first-class undergraduate degree), and he holds MA and PhD degrees from the State University of New York at Buffalo. His 1981 PhD dissertation was titled The Making of a Monster: The Working Class in the Industrial Novels and Social Investigations of 1830–1855.

He wrote and taught about literacy, pedagogy, contemporary poetry, and teacher-research. His best-known book, Working Classics (1990), co-edited with Peter Oresick, was the first scholarly work to highlight a seldom acknowledged working-class presence within contemporary American poetry.

In the 1990s he was also a field director of the National Writing Project (NWP). From the late 1980s until 2002 he directed the Western Pennsylvania Writing Project, a site of the NWP, working to improve children's writing and academic performance in K-12 schools in the Western Pennsylvania region.

== Family ==
Coles is the eldest of four children. His father, John Howard Coles, was educated at Jesus College, Cambridge, and served as a solicitor in Leeds, England, having co-founded the law firm Walker Morris . Coles has lived in the United States since 1972 and is a citizen. He has lived in Buffalo, N.Y.; Boulder, Colo.; and primarily in Pittsburgh, Pa. In 1990 he separated from his ex-wife Annie Kraft, the mother of his elder son, in order to establish a relationship with psychotherapist, author, and artist Jennifer Matesa, whom he married in 1994; they had a son, Jono Coles (now an architect).

== Works ==
- Nicholas Coles; Peter Oresick, eds. (1995). For a Living: The Poetry of Work. University of Illinois Press. ISBN 978-0-252-06410-4.
- Peter Oresick; Nicholas Coles, eds. (1990). Working Classics: Poems on Industrial Life. University of Illinois Press. ISBN 978-0-252-06133-2. "nicholas coles."
- Nicholas Coles; Janet Zandy, eds. (2007). American Working-Class Literature: An Anthology. Oxford University Press. ISBN 978-0-19-514456-7.
