= Jan Beatty =

American poet

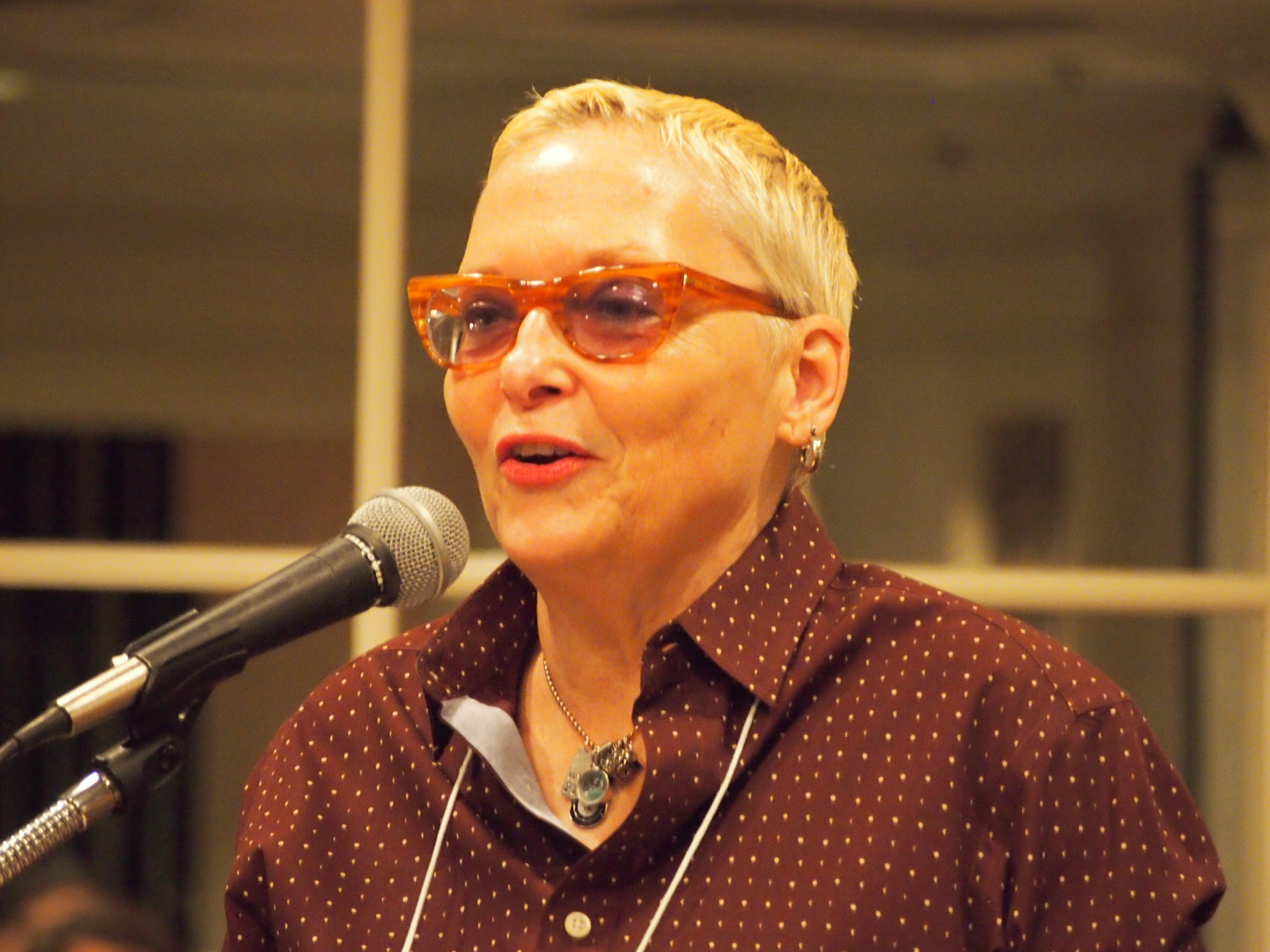
- Born: 1952 (age 73–74); Pittsburgh, Pennsylvania, U.S.
- Education: West Virginia University (BA); University of Pittsburgh (MFA)
- Occupation: Poet
- Writing career
- Language: English
- Genre: Poetry
- Website: www.janbeatty.com

Jan Beatty is an American poet. She is a recipient of the Agnes Lynch Starrett Poetry Prize, the Pablo Neruda Prize for Poetry, and the Creative Achievement Award in Literature.

== Life ==
Born in 1952 in Pittsburgh, Pennsylvania, she received her Bachelor of Arts from the West Virginia University and her Master of Fine Arts from the University of Pittsburgh. She currently resides in Pittsburgh, Pennsylvania, with her husband, musician Don Hollowood.

Her most recent poetry collection is The Switching/Yard (University of Pittsburgh Press, 2013), and her poems have appeared in literary journals and magazines including Quarterly West, Gulf Coast, Indiana Review, and Court Green, and in anthologies published by Oxford University Press, University of Illinois Press, and University of Iowa Press. Her honors include fellowships from the Ucross Foundation, the Pennsylvania Council on the Arts, and Yaddo. She was awarded the Pablo Neruda Prize for Poetry from the Tulsa Arts and Humanities Council in 1990, and the $15,000 Creative Achievement Award in Literature from the Heinz Foundation. Her first book, Mad River, won the Agnes Lynch Starrett Poetry Prize of the University of Pittsburgh Press in 1994. Some of Beatty's poetry, considered sexually explicit, led to problems with a scheduled reading at Joseph-Beth Booksellers in April 2008.

Beatty currently heads the writing program at Carlow University, where she also directs the Madwomen in the Attic Writing Workshop. She has also taught creative writing at the University of Pittsburgh. Along with Ellen Wadey, Beatty hosts and produces Prosody, a weekly radio program featuring the work of national writers.

== Published works ==
- American Bastard, poetry (Red Hen Press, 2021)
- The Body Wars, poetry (Pittsburgh: University of Pittsburgh Press, 2020).
- Jackknife: New and Selected Poems, poetry (Pittsburgh: University of Pittsburgh Press, 2017).
- The Switching/Yard, poetry (Pittsburgh: University of Pittsburgh Press, 2013).
- Ravage, poetry chapbook (Lefty Blondie Press, 2012).
- Red Sugar, poetry (Pittsburgh: University of Pittsburgh Press, 2008).
- Boneshaker, poetry (Pittsburgh: University of Pittsburgh Press, 2002).
- Mad River, poetry (Pittsburgh: University of Pittsburgh Press, 1995).
- Ravenous, poetry chapbook (Brockport, NY: State Street Press, 1995).

== Honors and awards ==
- 1994 Agnes Lynch Starrett Poetry Prize
- 1990 Pablo Neruda Prize for Poetry from the Tulsa Arts and Humanities Council
- Creative Achievement Award in Literature from the H. J. Heinz Foundation
