= Richard Shelton (writer) =

American poet and professor (1933–2022)

Richard Shelton (June 24, 1933 – November 29, 2022) was an American writer, poet and emeritus Regents Professor of English at the University of Arizona.

Shelton was born in Boise, Idaho on June 24, 1933. He wrote nine books of poetry; his first collection of poems, The Tattooed Desert, won the International Poetry Forum's U.S. Award. His 1992 memoir Going Back to Bisbee, a New York Times Notable Book was selected for the One Book Arizona program in 2007. Shelton also won the Western States Book Award for Creative Nonfiction in 1992 for Going Back to Bisbee. In 2000, Shelton received a $100,000 grant from the Lannan Foundation to complete two books.

His poems and prose pieces have appeared in more than two hundred magazines and journals including The New Yorker, The Atlantic, The Paris Review, and The Antioch Review. They have been translated into Spanish, French, Swedish, Polish, and Japanese.

In 1974, Shelton established a writer's workshop at the Arizona State Prison, and a number of books of prose and poetry written by men in Shelton's prison workshops have been published, including the writing of authors Jimmy Santiago Baca and Ken Lamberton. Shelton was directing three prison writers' workshops in three units of the Arizona State Prison. His last book, Crossing the Yard: Thirty Years as a Prison Volunteer is about this experience. It won the 2007 Southwest Books of the Year award.

Shelton died on November 29, 2022, at the age of 89.
