= Gary Soto =

American poet and writer (born 1952)

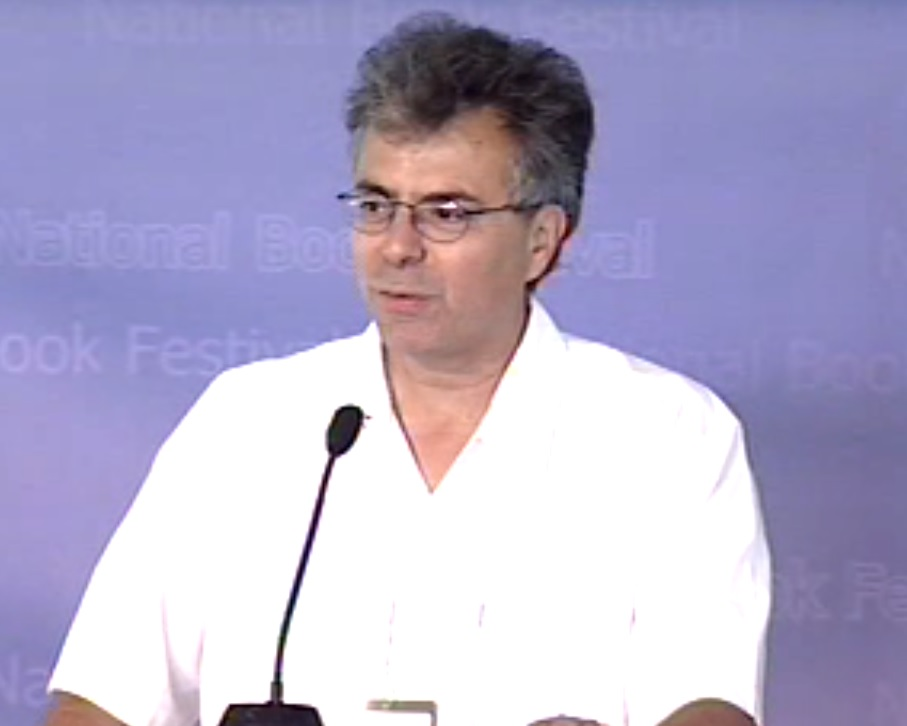
- Soto at the 2001 National Book Festival
- Born: Gary Anthony Soto; April 12, 1952 (age 74); Fresno, California, U.S.
- Education: California State University, Fresno (BA); University of California, Irvine (MFA)
- Occupations: Author, poet
- Writing career
- Period: 1977–present
- Genres: poetry, novels, memoirs, children's literature
- Notable works: Petty Crimes; New and Selected Poems; Living Up the Street
- Notable awards: Academy of American Poets Prize; American Book Award; NEA Fellowship; Guggenheim Fellowship
- Website: garysoto.com

Gary Anthony Soto (born April 12, 1952) is an American poet, novelist, and memoirist.

== Life and career ==
Soto was born to Mexican-American parents Manuel (1910–1957) and Angie Soto (1924–). In his youth, he worked in the fields of the San Joaquin Valley. Soto's father died in 1957, when he was five years old. As his family had to struggle to find work, he had little time or encouragement in his studies. Soto notes that in spite of his poor early academic record, while at high school he found an interest in poetry through writers such as Ernest Hemingway, John Steinbeck, Jules Verne, Robert Frost and Thornton Wilder.

Soto attended Fresno City College and California State University, Fresno, where he earned his B.A. degree in English in 1974, studying with poet Philip Levine. He did graduate work in poetry writing at the University of California, Irvine, where he was the first Mexican-American to earn a M.F.A. in 1976. He states that he wanted to become a writer in college after discovering the novelist Gabriel García Márquez and the contemporary poets Edward Field, W. S. Merwin, Charles Simic, James Wright and Pablo Neruda, whom he calls "the master of them all."

Soto taught at University of California, Berkeley and at the University of California, Riverside, where he was a Distinguished Professor.

Soto was a 'Young People's Ambassador' for the United Farm Workers of America, introducing young people to the organization's work and goals. Soto became the sponsor for the Pattonville High School Spanish National Honor Society in 2009.

Soto lives in northern California, dividing his time between Berkeley and Fresno, but is no longer teaching.

== Work ==
Soto's poetry focuses on daily experiences, often reflecting on his life as a Mexican American. Regarding his relationship with the Mexican-American community, Soto commented "as a writer, my duty is not to make people perfect, particularly Mexican Americans. I’m not a cheerleader. I’m one who provides portraits of people in the rush of life."

Soto writes novels, plays and memoirs, and has edited several literary anthologies. His story "The No-Guitar Blues" was made into a film, and he produced another film based on his book "The Pool Party." He is a prolific writer of children's books.

About his work Joyce Carol Oates noted "Gary Soto's poems are fast, funny, heartening, and achingly believable, like Polaroid love letters, or snatches of music heard out of a passing car; patches of beauty like patches of sunlight; the very pulse of a life."

== Awards and honors ==
Soto's first collection of poems, The Elements of San Joaquin, won the United States Award of the International Poetry Forum in 1976 prior to its publication in the Pitt Poetry Series in 1977. The New York Times Book Review also honored the book by reprinting six of the poems. In 1985, his memoir Living Up the Street received the Before Columbus Foundation's American Book Award.

In 1993, Soto received the Andrew Carnegie Medal for Film Excellence from the Association for Library Service to Children for his production work on the film The Pool Party. In 1999, Soto received the Hispanic Heritage Award for Literature, the Author-Illustrator Civil Rights Award from the National Education Association, and the PEN Center West Book Award for Petty Crimes.

Other honors include the "Discovery"/The Nation Prize, the Bess Hokin Prize and the Levinson Award from Poetry. He has received The California Library Association's John and Patricia Beatty Award (twice), a Recognition of Merit from the Claremont Graduate School for Baseball in April, the Silver Medal from the Commonwealth Club of California, and the Tomás Rivera Prize.

The library at Winchell Elementary School in Fresno was named after Soto.

In 2011, the Old Administration Building at Fresno City College became the permanent home of the Gary Soto Literary Museum.

In 2014, Soto received the Phoenix Award for his 1994 children's book Jesse. The award committee stated: "Jesse is both a coming-of-age story of one Mexican-American boy with a poetic sensibility and the story of a community and a country at a difficult time—facing poverty and prejudice and war, problems we are still facing today. Jesse offers an unembellished slice of life in Vietnam-era Fresno, California."

== Bibliography ==
=== Poetry collections ===
- Downtime (Gunpowder Press, 2023)
- Meatballs for the People: Proverbs to Chew On (Red Hen Press, 2017)
- Sudden Loss of Dignity. Stephen F. Austin University Press. 2013. ISBN 978-1-62288-005-8.
- Partly Cloudy: Poems of love and longing (Harcourt, 2009)
- A Simple Plan (Chronicle Books, 2007)
- One Kind of Faith (Chronicle Books, 2003)
- A Natural Man (Chronicle Books, 1999)
- Junior College (1997)
- New and selected poems (Chronicle Books, 1995) National Book Award finalist
- Canto Familiar/Familiar Song (1994)
- Neighborhood Odes (1992)
- Home Course in Religion (1991)
- Saturday at the Canal (1991)
- Who Will Know Us? (1990)
- Black Hair (1985)
- Where Sparrows Work Hard (1981)
- The Tale of Sunlight (1978)
- The Elements of San Joaquin (1977)
- Waiting at the curb: Lynwood California (1967)

=== Young adult/children's books ===
- Baseball in April (1990)
- A Fire in My Hands (1991)
- Taking Sides (1991)
- Pacific Crossing (1992), sequel to Taking Sides added by DaeQuan Jones
- Too Many Tamales (1992)
- The Skirt (1992)
- The Pool Party (1993)
- Local News (1993)
- Jesse (1994)
- 7th grade (1995)
- Crazy Weekend (1994)
- Boys at Work (1995)
- Summer On Wheels (1995)
- Canto Familiar (1995)
- Buried Onions (1997)
- The Cat's Meow (1997)
- Jessie De La Cruz: A Profile of a United Farm Worker (2000)
- Fearless Fernie (2002)
- If the Shoe Fits (2002)
- The Afterlife (2003)
- Marisol (2005)
- When Dad Came Back (2011), ebook

==== Chato ====
Beginning in 1995 with Chato's Kitchen (Chato y su cena), Soto released a series of children's picture books in Spanish and English about a real, cool cat (gato), a low rider from the barrio of East Los Angeles. They were illustrated by Susan Guevara, and the second one Chato and the Party Animals (Chato y los amigos pachangueros.) (2000) won the Pura Belpre Medal for best illustration in 2002. The series continued with Chato Goes Cruisin' (2004) and Chato's Day of Dead (2006).

=== Anthologies as editor ===
- Entrance: Four Latino Poets (1976)
- California Childhood (1988)
- Pieces of Heart (1993)

=== Memoir ===
- Why I Don't Write Children's Literature (2015)
- What Poets Are Like: Up and Down with the Writing Life (2013)
- Living Up the Street (1985), American Book Award
- Small Faces (1986)
- Lesser Evils: Ten Quartets (1988)
- A Summer Life (1990)
- The Effects of Knut Hamsun on a Fresno Boy (2001)
- The Jacket (1983)

=== Plays ===
- Novio Boy: A play (2006)
- Nerdlandia (1999)

=== Film ===
- The No-Guitar Blues (1991) based on a story from Baseball in April
- The Bike (1991, director)
- The Pool Party (producer, 1992) Carnegie Medal for Excellence in Children's Video (1993)
- Novio Boy (1994, director)
