= Maggie Anderson =

American poet and editor (born 1948)

- Born: September 23, 1948 (age 77); New York City
- Education: Bachelor's Degree in English with High Honors from West Virginia University (1970); M.A. in English (Creative Writing) from West Virginia University in 1973; M.S.W. from West Virginia University in 1977
- Occupations: American poet and editor
- Writing career
- Notable works: Windfall: New and Selected Poems (University of Pittsburgh Press, 2000); Wick Poetry First Book Series (founder and editor); Wick Poetry Chapbook Series for Ohio Poets (Kent State University Press, 1993–2011); co-founded Trellis, a poetry journal, in 1971
- Notable awards: Two fellowships in poetry from the National Endowment for the Arts; Isabella Gardner Fellowship.; University Distinguished Teaching Awards from KSU Alumni Association in 2002; Helen and Laura Kraut Memorial Ohioana Poetry Award from the Ohioana Library Association (2003); Honored by Emory and Henry College at their 23rd annual Appalachian Literary Festival (2004); Honored with a Distinguished Scholar Award from Kent State University

Maggie Anderson (born September 23, 1948) is an American poet and editor with roots in Appalachia.

== Education and beginning of career ==
Anderson attended West Virginia Wesleyan College from 1966–68 and earned a bachelor's degree in English, with high honors, from West Virginia University in 1970. Her M.A. in English (Creative Writing) in 1973 and an M.S.W. in 1977 were also from WVU. She worked as a rehabilitation counselor for blind and visually impaired clients at the West Virginia Rehabilitation Center from 1973-77. Beginning in 1979, she worked as poet-in-residence for ten years, in schools, senior centers, correctional facilities and libraries in West Virginia, Ohio, and Pennsylvania. She has served as visiting writer at several universities, including the University of Pittsburgh, the University of Oregon, the Pennsylvania State University, Hamilton College, and West Virginia University. In addition to her travels in the United States, Anderson has lived in Denmark (1992–1993) and traveled extensively throughout western and eastern Europe, Russia, and Scandinavia.

== Teaching ==
In 1989, Anderson began teaching creative writing at Kent State University and was appointed coordinator of the Wick Poetry Program in 1992. In 2004, when the Wick Poetry Program celebrated its 20th anniversary and received a $2 million endowment to create the Wick Poetry Center in the College of Arts and Sciences, Anderson was named director. Anderson was on the founding committee of the Northeast Ohio Master of Fine Arts in Creative Writing and served as Kent State University’s Campus Coordinator for the NEOMFA from 2003–2006 and as Director of the Northeast Ohio MFA Consortium from 2006-2009. Upon her retirement from KSU in 2009, the Maggie Anderson Endowment Fund was established in her honor. The Fund aims to assist talented writing students at the university with writing-related travel expenses.

== Poetry ==
Anderson is the author of several poetry collections, the most recent of which is Dear All, (Four Way Books, 2017), and the founder and editor of the Wick Poetry First Book Series and the Wick Poetry Chapbook Series for Ohio Poets (Kent State University Press, 1993–2011). In 1971 she co-founded Trellis, a poetry journal, with Winston Fuller and Irene McKinney, and served as editor until 1981.

== Awards ==
Anderson’s awards and honors include two fellowships in poetry from the National Endowment for the Arts and grants from the Ohio Arts Council and the MacDowell Colony, including an Isabella Gardner fellowship. In 2004, Emory and Henry College in Virginia honored her at their 23rd annual Appalachian Literary Festival, and Kent State University honored her with a Distinguished Scholar Award. In 2003, she received the Helen and Laura Kraut Memorial Ohioana Poetry Award from the Ohioana Library Association. In 2002, the KSU Alumni Association awarded her one of just three University Distinguished Teaching Awards.

== Journal publications and music ==
More than 40 of Anderson’s poems have been published in poetry journals, including The American Poetry Review, New Letters, Prairie Schooner, The Georgia Review, and Hamilton Stone Review, and her work has appeared in more than 50 anthologies and textbooks. Essays have appeared in 17 anthologies and journals of contemporary poetry and poetics. Her poems have been set to music four times by contemporary composers, including "The Dream Vegetables" in Dreams and Nocturnes: Chamber Music of Stephen Gryc, "In Singing Weather" by Monica Houghton, "Nightmare" by Anne LeBaron, and "Related to the Sky" from "Sun Songs and Nocturnes" by John David Earnest, an a cappella piece for male chorus performed at Lincoln Center in 1992 by Chanticleer and the New Jersey Philharmonic Orchestra.

== Works ==
- Dear All, (Four Way Books, 2017)
- Windfall: New and Selected Poems. (Pittsburgh: University of Pittsburgh Press, 2000)
- A Space Filled with Moving. (Pittsburgh: University of Pittsburgh Press, 1992)
- Cold Comfort. (Pittsburgh: University of Pittsburgh Press, 1986)
- Years That Answer. (New York: Harper and Row Publishers, Inc., 1980)
- Greatest Hits: 1984-2004. (Columbus: Pudding House Publications, 2004)
- The Great Horned Owl. (Riderwood: Icarus Press, 1979)
