= Jim Daniels =

American poet and writer

James Raymond Daniels (born 1956 in Detroit, Michigan) is an American poet and writer.

He lives in Pittsburgh with his wife, the writer Kristin Kovacic.

== Life and work ==
Daniels' writing style is as this:
Fine dust in the summer field of childhood
and the dark dank of lust
unfinished and forgotten feuds
vile taunts and sing-song slurs.
The tainted gentle stench of weeds
the absence of stately trees, adult supervision
the wide flat factories
the chemical tar of their parking lots.
The bicycles and t-shirts and greasy rags
and the foreign tenderness of girls
we shied away from, then dreamt about.

Daniels was on the faculty of the creative writing program at Carnegie Mellon University in Pittsburgh, Pennsylvania, from 1981 to 2021, where he was the Thomas Stockham Baker University Professor of English. He taught in the Antioch University-Los Angeles low-residency MFA Program from 2007 to 2021. He currently teaches in the Alma College low-residency MFA Program.

The majority of Daniels' papers are held in Michigan State University Libraries Special Collections.

Daniels' literary works have been recognized and highlighted at Michigan State University in their Michigan Writers Series. He won the inaugural Brittingham Prize in Poetry in 1985 from the University of Wisconsin–Madison. He was educated at Alma College and Bowling Green State University.

== Works ==
=== Poetry ===
- Factory Poems (Alma: Jack-in-the-Box Press, 1979)
- On the Line (Menomonee Falls: Signpost Press, 1981)
- Places/Everyone (Madison: University of Wisconsin Press, 1985)
- The Long Ball (Pittsburgh: Pig-in-a-Poke Press, 1988)
- Digger's Territory (Easthampton: Adastra Press, 1989)
- Punching Out (Detroit: Wayne State University Press, 1990)
- Hacking It (St. Clair Shores: Ridgeway Press, 1992)
- M-80 (Pittsburgh: University of Pittsburgh Press, 1993)
- Niagara Falls (Easthampton: Adastra Press, 1994)
- Blessing the House (Pittsburgh: University of Pittsburgh Press, 1993)
- Brooding the Heartlands (Huron: Bottom Dog Press, 1998)
- Blue Jesus (Pittsburgh: Carnegie Mellon University Press, 2000)
- Black Vinyl, Red Vinyl (Toledo: Aureole Press, 2001)
- Greatest Hits (Johnstown: Pudding House Press, 2002)
- Night with Drive-by Shooting Stars (Kalamazoo: New Issues Press, 2002)
- Digger's Blues, (Easthampton: Adastra Press, 2002)
- Show and Tell: New and Selected Poems (Madison: University of Wisconsin Press, 2003)
- Street (Huron: Bottom Dog Press, 2005)
- Now Showing (Burlington, Ontario: Aladada Books, 2006)
- Revolt of the Crash-Test Dummies (Cheney: Eastern Washington University Press, 2007)
- In Line for the Exterminator (Detroit: Wayne State University Press, 2007)
- From Milltown to Malltown (Grosse Pointe Farms: Marick Press, 2010)
- Having a Little Talk with Capital P Poetry (Pittsburgh: Carnegie Mellon University Press, 2011)
- All of the Above. (Easthampton: Adastra Press, 2011)
- Birth Marks. (Rochester: BOA Editions, 2013)
- Apology to the Moon, (Midland: BatCat Press, 2015)
- Rowing Inland, (Detroit: Wayne State University Press, 2017)
- Street Calligraphy (Bowling Green, KY: Steel Toe Books, 2017)
- The Middle Ages (Santa Fe, NM: Red Mountain Press, 2018)
- Gun/Shy (Detroit: Wayne State University Press, 2021)
- The Human Engine at Dawn (South Bend: Wolfson Press, 2022)
- Comment Card (Pittsburgh: Carnegie Mellon University Press, 2024)
- Ars Poetica Chemistrica (Greensburgh, PA: WPA Press, 2025)
- Late Invocation for Magic (East Lansing: Michigan State University Press, forthcoming, 2026)

=== Fiction ===
- No Pets, stories (Huron: Bottom Dog Press, 1999)
- Detroit Tales, stories (East Lansing: Michigan State University Press, 2003)
- Mr. Pleasant, stories (East Lansing: Michigan State University Press, 2007)
- Trigger Man: More Tales of the Motor City, stories (East Lansing: Michigan State University Press, 2011)
- Eight Mile High, stories (East Lansing: Michigan State University Press, 2014)
- The Perp Walk, stories (East Lansing: Michigan State University Press, 2019)
- The Luck of the Fall, stories (East Lansing: Michigan State University Press, 2023)

=== Nonfiction ===
- An Ignorance of Trees, essays (University of Wisconsin-Stevens Point: Cornerstone Press, 2025)

=== Screenplays ===
- No Pets, screenplay (director: Tony Buba) (Braddock: Braddock Films, 1994)
- Dumpster, screenplay (director: John Rice) (Pittsburgh: Three Rivers Film Festival, 2005)
- Mr. Pleasant, screenplay (director: John Rice) (Pittsburgh: Three Rivers Film Festival, 2010)
- The End of Blessings, screenplay (director: John Rice) (Pittsburgh: Three Rivers Film Festival, 2015)

=== Anthologies ===
- The Carnegie Mellon Anthology of Poetry, (co-editor) poetry anthology (Pittsburgh: Carnegie Mellon University Press, 1993)
- Letters to America: Contemporary Poetry on Race, (editor) poetry anthology (Detroit: Wayne State University Press, 1995)
- American Poetry: The Next Generation, (co-editor) poetry anthology (Pittsburgh: Carnegie Mellon University Press, 2000)
- Challenges to the Dream: The Best of the Martin Luther King, Jr. Day Writing Awards, (editor) (Pittsburgh: Carnegie Mellon University Press, 2017)
- R E S P E C T: The Poetry of Detroit Music, (co-editor) anthology (East Lansing: Michigan State University Press, 2020)

== Sources ==
Contemporary Authors Online. The Gale Group, 2003. PEN (Permanent Entry Number): 0000023043.
