= David Wojahn =

American poet (born 1953)

- Born: 1953 (age 72–73)
- Education: University of Minnesota (BA); University of Arizona (MFA)
- Occupations: Poet and Professor of Creative Writing
- Writing career
- Period: 1970s-present
- Genre: Poetry
- Notable works: Icehouse Lights, 1982

David Wojahn (born 1953, in St. Paul, Minnesota) is a contemporary American poet who is a Professor Emeritus in the Department of English at Virginia Commonwealth University, and in the low residency MFA in Writing program at the Vermont College of Fine Arts. He has been the director of Virginia Commonwealth University's Creative Writing Program.

== Career ==
He was educated at the University of Minnesota and the University of Arizona.

Wojahn taught for many years at Indiana University. He has also taught at University of Alabama, University of Arkansas at Little Rock, University of Chicago, University of Houston, and University of New Orleans. In 2003, he joined Virginia Commonwealth University in Richmond, Virginia. He also teaches at Vermont College of Fine Arts.

== Poetry ==
Much of Wojahn's poetry is metrical although he also works in free verse, usually addressing political and social issues in American life. He often takes as his subjects moments of significance in popular culture, such as the assassination of John Lennon, the professional decline of Jim Morrison or the drowning of Brian Jones. He has said that he hopes his poetry is considered "activist."

The poet Richard Hugo selected Wojahn's first book, Icehouse Lights, as a winner of the Yale Series of Younger Poets prize. "David Wojahn's poems concern themselves with emotive basics: leaving home, watching those we love age and die, the inescapable drone of our mortality," Hugo wrote. "Yet as poems, they are far from usual. They help us welcome inside, again and again, the most personal of feelings."

Wojahn has gone on to publish seven more books of poetry, all with the University of Pittsburgh Press. Wojahn has also edited a volume of poetry by his late wife, Lynda Hull, entitled The Only World (HarperPerennial, 1995), as well as her more recent Collected Poems (Graywolf, 2006).

== Awards ==
- Bread Loaf Writers’ Conference
- writing residencies from the Yaddo, and McDowell colonies.
- 1987-1988 Amy Lowell Poetry Travelling Scholarship
- Icehouse Lights, was chosen by Richard Hugo as a winner of the 1982 Yale Series of Younger Poets prize, winner of the Poetry Society of America's William Carlos Williams Book Award.
- Glassworks, awarded the Society of Midland Authors’ Award for best volume of poetry
- Interrogation Palace: New and Selected Poems 1982-2004, was one of three named finalists for the Pulitzer Prize, and winner of the O. B. Hardison, Jr. Poetry Prize from the Folger Shakespeare Library
- In April 2007, Wojahn was one of two finalists for the Pulitzer Prize for Interrogation Palace.
- 2003 List of Guggenheim Fellowships awarded in 2003
- National Endowment for the Arts, Fellowship
- Illinois Arts Council award
- the Fine Arts Work Center in Provincetown, Fellowship
- William Carlos Williams Award
- Celia B. Wagner Award from the Poetry Society of America
- Vermont College's Crowley/Weingarten Award for Excellence in Teaching
- George Kent Prize from Poetry magazine
- Six Pushcart Prizes.
- 2008 he was named VCU's Outstanding Faculty Award Winner
- 2008 Carole Weinstein Poetry Prize.
- 2013 Poets' Prize

== Works ==
=== Poetry Books ===
- For the Scribe. University of Pittsburgh Press, 2017.
- World Tree. Pittsburgh: University of Pittsburgh Press. 2011. ISBN 978-0-8229-6142-0.
- Interrogation Palace: New and Selected Poems 1982-2004. Pittsburgh: University of Pittsburgh Press. 2006. ISBN 978-0-8229-5917-5.
- Spirit Cabinet. Pittsburgh: University of Pittsburgh Press. 2002. ISBN 978-0-8229-5776-8.
- The Falling Hour. Pittsburgh: University of Pittsburgh Press. 1997. ISBN 978-0-8229-3995-5.
- Late Empire. Pittsburgh: University of Pittsburgh Press. 1994. ISBN 978-0-8229-3793-7.
- Mystery Train. Pittsburgh: University of Pittsburgh Press. 1990. ISBN 978-0-8229-3637-4.
- Glassworks. Pittsburgh: University of Pittsburgh Press. 1987. ISBN 978-0-8229-3553-7.
- Icehouse Lights. New Haven: Yale University Press. 1982. ISBN 978-0-300-02816-4.

=== Essays ===
- From the Valley of Making: Essays on the Craft of Poetry. University of Michigan Press. 2015. ISBN 978-0-472-07250-7.
- Strange Good Fortune (Arkansas, 2001)
- "The Language of My Former Heart" : The Memory-Narrative In Recent American Poetry (Published in Green Mountains Review 1988)

=== Edited ===
- Lynda Hull (1995). David Wojahn (ed.). The Only World. HarperPerennial. ISBN 978-0-06-095112-2.
- Profile of Twentieth Century American Poetry, with Jack Myers (Southern Illinois University, 1991)
