= Lawrence Joseph =

American poet (born 1948)

- Born: 1948 (age 77–78); Detroit, Michigan, U.S.
- Education: University of Detroit Jesuit High School; University of Michigan (B.A., 1970); Magdalene College, Cambridge (B.A., 1972; M.A., 1976); University of Michigan Law School (J.D., 1975)
- Occupations: Poet, writer, essayist, critic, lawyer, professor of law
- Spouse: Nancy Van Goethem
- Writing career
- Notable works: Shouting at No One (1983); Curriculum Vitae (1988); Before Our Eyes (1993); Codes, Precepts, Biases, and Taboos: Poems 1973–1993 (2005); Into It (2005); So Where Are We? (2017); A Certain Clarity (2020); Lawyerland (1997); The Game Changed: Essays and Other Prose (2011)
- Notable awards: John Simon Guggenheim Memorial Foundation fellowship; 2 National Endowment for the Arts fellowships; Hopwood Award in poetry

Lawrence Joseph (born 1948 in Detroit, Michigan) is an American poet, writer, essayist, critic, lawyer, and professor of law.

== Early life and education ==
Lawrence Joseph was born in 1948 in Detroit, Michigan. Joseph's grandparents, Lebanese Maronite and Syrian Melkite Eastern Catholics, were among the first Arab Americans to emigrate to Detroit around 1910, where both Joseph's parents were born.

He attended the University of Detroit Jesuit High School, the University of Michigan (B.A, 1970), Magdalene College, Cambridge (B.A. 1972, M.A. 1976), and the University of Michigan Law School (J. D. 1975).

== Career ==
Joseph, perhaps best known as a poet, won the 1983 Agnes Lynch Starrett Poetry Prize from the Pitt Poetry Series for his first book, Shouting at No One. His second book of poems, Curriculum Vitae, was published by the University of Pittsburgh Press in 1988. His most recent books of poems, Before Our Eyes (1993); Codes, Precepts, Biases, and Taboos: Poems 1973–1993 (2005), Into It (2005); So Where Are We? (2017); and A Certain Clarity (2020) are published by Farrar, Straus and Giroux.

Joseph is also the author of Lawyerland, a book of prose, published by FSG in 1997. Lawyerland was optioned for a film by John Malkovich, Lianne Helfon and Russell Smith's Mr. Mudd Productions. A symposium, "The Lawyerland Essays," appeared in the Columbia Law Review. His book The Game Changed : Essays and Other Prose, appeared in 2011 in the University of Michigan Press’s Poets on Poetry series.

Joseph's poems, essays and criticism have appeared in magazines and newspapers both in the United States and internationally. His essay on Motown music and Rhythm and Blues, "The Music Is," which originally appeared in Tin House, was included in Da Capo Best Music Writing 2003, chosen by Guest Editor Matt Groening. His work has been widely anthologized, and his poetry is included in The Oxford Book of American Poetry.

Joseph is also the Tinnelly Professor of Law at St. John's University School of Law in New York City. Joseph served as law clerk to Justice G. Mennen Williams of the Michigan Supreme Court. He then joined the faculty at the University of Detroit School of Law. In 1981, he moved to New York City, where he was associated with the firm of Shearman & Sterling. He joined the St. John's law faculty in 1987.

Writing as a lawyer, Joseph has published in areas of labor, employment, tort and compensation law, jurisprudence, law and literature, and legal theory. He has served as Consultant on Tort and Compensation Law for the Michigan State Senate's Commission on Courts, and as Consultant for the Governor of Michigan's Commission on Workers' Compensation, Occupational Disease and Employment and has received a grant from the Employment Standards Division of the United States Department of Labor. He is former Chairperson of the Association of American Law Schools section on Law and Interpretation.

Joseph has read from his work at numerous universities and law schools throughout the country and internationally, including Stanford University, Columbia University, Harvard University, University of Michigan, New York University, University of Pennsylvania, Georgetown University, and Northwestern University. Among his awards are also a fellowship from the John Simon Guggenheim Memorial Foundation and two National Endowment for the Arts fellowships. In 2006 he was named the third recipient of the New York County Lawyers Association's "Law and Literature Award" (prior recipients are Louis Auchincloss and Louis Begley). As an undergraduate at Michigan, he received a major Hopwood Award in poetry.

He has been a member of the board of directors of Poets House, Poetry Society of America, and The Writer's Voice, and served on the International PEN Events Committee. In 1989, he lectured on law and on poetry in Jordan, Palestine, and Egypt through the cultural affairs offices of the United States embassies in each country. In 1994, he taught in the Council of the Humanities and Creative Writing Program at Princeton University.

His literary, professional, and personal papers have been acquired by the University of Michigan's Special Collections Library and are housed at the Hatcher Graduate Library.

Joseph is a member of Phi Beta Kappa and the American Bar Association. He is married to the painter Nancy Van Goethem and lives in New York City.

== Bibliography ==
=== Poetry ===
Collections

- Shouting at No One (Pittsburgh: University of Pittsburgh Press, 1983)
- Curriculum Vitae (Pittsburgh: University of Pittsburgh Press, 1988)
- Before Our Eyes (New York: Farrar, Straus and Giroux, 1993)
- Codes, Precepts, Biases, and Taboos: Poems 1973–1993 (New York: Farrar, Straus and Giroux, 2005)
- Into It (New York: Farrar, Straus and Giroux, 2005)
- So Where Are We? Poems, poetry, (New York: Farrar, Straus and Giroux, 2017)
- A Certain Clarity: Selected Poems, poetry (Farrar Straus and Giroux, 2020)

List of poems

Title	Year	First published	Reprinted/collected
A fable	2016	Joseph, Lawrence (January 25, 2016). "A fable". The New Yorker. 91 (45): 52–53.	

=== Other works ===
- Lawyerland, prose, (New York: Farrar, Straus and Giroux, 1997)
- The Game Changed: Essays and Other Prose, criticism, (Ann Arbor, MI: University of Michigan Press, 2011)

———————
