= Peter Oresick =

American writer (1955–2016)

Peter Oresick (/ɔːˈrɛsɪk/ or-ESS-ik; September 8, 1955 – September 3, 2016) was an American poet.

Oresick was best known as the editor of Working Classics, a literary anthology of working-class poetry, and as a publisher. He served in senior positions in literary, scholarly, and technical publishing from 1981 to 2004 at the University of Pittsburgh Press, the Graphic Arts Technical Foundation, and Printing Industries of America. In 2010, he became editor-in-chief of the literary magazine The Fourth River.

Oresick earned his B.A. and M.F.A. at the University of Pittsburgh. He taught at Emerson College, the Tepper School of Business at Carnegie Mellon University, Chatham University, the University of Pittsburgh, and the Pittsburgh High School for the Creative and Performing Arts.

Oresick resided in Pittsburgh. He died on 3 September 2016 at the age of 60 from cancer.

== Published works ==
=== Poetry ===
- Iconoscope: New and Selected Poems, poetry (Pittsburgh: University of Pittsburgh Press, 2015).
- To a Museum Guard at Shift Change, poetry (Chicago: West North Press, 2012).
- Warhol-o-rama, poetry (Pittsburgh: Carnegie Mellon University Press, 2008).
- For a Living: The Poetry of Work, (co-editor with Nicholas Coles), poetry anthology (Urbana and Chicago: University of Illinois Press, 1995).
- Fermi Buffalo, by Louise McNeil (posthumously), (editor), poetry (Pittsburgh: University of Pittsburgh Press, 1994).
- The Pittsburgh Book of Contemporary American Poetry, (co-editor with Ed Ochester), poetry anthology (Pittsburgh: University of Pittsburgh Press, 1993).
- Despite the Plainness of Day: Love Poems, by David Ignatow, (co-editor with Anthony Petrosky), poetry (Pittsburgh: Mill Hunk Books, 1991).
- Working Classics: Poems on Industrial Life, (co-editor with Nicholas Coles), poetry anthology (Urbana and Chicago: University of Illinois Press, 1990).
- Definitions, poetry (Albuquerque: West End Press, 1990).
- An American Peace, (Foreword by Gerald Stern) poetry (Minneapolis: Shadow Press USA, 1985)
- Other Lives, poetry (Easthampton: Adastra Press, 1985).
- The Story of Glass, poetry (Cambridge: West End Press, 1977).

== Sources ==
- Contemporary Authors Online. The Gale Group, 2006. PEN (Permanent Entry Number): 0000074923.
