= National Poetry Series =

American literary awards

The National Poetry Series is an American literary awards program.

Every year since 1979, the National Poetry Series has sponsored the publication of five books of poetry. Manuscripts are solicited through an annual open competition, judged and chosen by poets of national stature, and issued by various publishers. Past judges of this prestigious series include Louise Glück (12th Poet Laureate of the United States), Tracy K. Smith (22nd Poet Laureate of the United States), Ada Limón (24th Poet Laureate of the United States), and Richard Blanco (United States inaugural poet).

The National Poetry Series has also created the Paz Prize for Poetry, named in honor of Nobel Prize-winning poet, Octavio Paz; this award recognizes a previously unpublished poetry book written in Spanish by a distinguished poet residing in the U.S. This award is highly recognized as one of the most important prizes in Spanish languages in the United States. Past winners of this prize include Dinapiera Di Donato by Colaterales/Collateral in 2012 and Cuban-American Carlos Pintado for his Nueve monedas/Nine coins in 2014.

== Winners ==
Each year links to its corresponding "[year] in poetry" article:

Year	Book	Author	Judge
2024	Games for Children	Keith Wilson	Rosalie Moffett
2024	82nd Division	D.M. Aderibigbe	Colin Channer
2024	Blue Loop	A.J. White	Chelsea Dingman
2024	Our Hands Hold Violence	Kieron Walquist	Brenda Hillman
2024	Shade is a Place	MaKshya Tolbert	Maggie Millner
2023	Field Guide for Accidents	Albert Abonado	Mahogany L. Browne
2023	Post-Volcanic Folk Tales	Mackenzie Schubert Poloyni Donnelly	Ishion Hutchinson
2023	The Sky Was Once A Dark Blanket	Kinsale Drake	Jacqueline Trimble
2023	Playing With The Jew	Ava Winter	Sean Hill
2023	the space between men	Mia S. Willis	Morgan Parker
2022	Sweet Movie	Alisha Dietzman	Victoria Chang
2022	Tender Headed	Olatunde Osinaike	Camille Rankine
2022	Survival Strategies	Tennison S. Black	Adrienne Su
2022	I Love Information	Courtney Bush	Brian Teare
2022	Organs of Little Importance	Adrienne Chung	Solmaz Sharif
2021	Symmetry of Fish	Su Cho	Paige Lewis
2021	Ask the Brindled	No'u Revilla	Rick Barot
2021	Extinction Theory	Kien Lam	Kyle Dargan
2021	Harbinger	Shelley Puhak	Nicole Sealey
2021	Relinquenda	Alexandra Lytton Regalado	Reginald Betts
2020	Dear Specimen	W.J. Herbert	Kwame Dawes
2020	[WHITE]	Trevor Ketner	Forrest Gander
2020	Borderline Fortune	Teresa K. Miller	Carol Muske-Dukes
2020	Requeening	Amanda P. Moore	Ocean Vuong
2020	Philomath	Devon Walker-Figueroa	Sally Keith
2019	Little Big Bully	Heid Erdrich	Amy Gerstler
2019	Field Music	Alexandria Hall	Rosanna Warren
2019	Fractal Shores	Diane Louie	Sherod Santos
2019	Thrown in the Throat	Benjamin Garcia	Kazim Ali
2019	An Incomplete List of Names	Michael Torres	Roque Salas Rivera
2018	Fear of Description	Daniel Poppick	Brenda Shaughnessy
2018	Valuing	Christopher Kondrich	Jericho Brown
2018	Eyes Bottle Dark with a Mouthful of Flowers	Jake Skeets	Kathy Fagan
2018	It's Not Magic	Jon Sands	Richard Blanco
2018	Nervous System	Rosalie Moffett	Monica Youn
2017	The Lumberjack's Dove	GennaRose Nethercott	Louise Glück
2017	Anarcha Speaks	Dominique Christina	Tyehimba Jess
2017	feeld	Jos Charles	Fady Joudah
2017	What It Doesn't Have to Do With	Lindsay Bernal	Paul Guest
2017	Museum of the Americas	J. Michael Martinez	Cornelius Eady
2016	I Know Your Kind: Poems	William Brewer	Ada Limón
2016	Thaw	Chelsea Dingman	Allison Joseph
2016	For Want of Water: And Other Poems	Sasha Pimentel	Gregory Pardlo
2016	Madness	Sam Sax	Terrance Hayes
2016	Civil Twilight	Jeffrey Schultz	David St. John
2015	The Sobbing School	Joshua Bennett	Eugene Gloria
2015	Trébuchet	Danniel Schoonebeek	Kevin Prufer
2015	Scriptorium	Melissa Range	Tracy K. Smith
2015	The Wug Test	Jennifer Kronovet	Eliza Griswold
2015	Not on the Last Day, But on the Very Last	Justin Boening	Wayne Miller
2014	Monograph	Simeon Berry of Somerville, Massachusetts	Denise Duhamel
2014	The Regret Histories	Joshua Poteat of Richmond, Virginia	Campbell McGrath
2014	Let's Let That Are Not Yet: Inferno	Ed Pavlić of Athens, Georgia	John Keene
2014	Double Jinx	Nancy Reddy of Madison, Wisconsin	Alex Lemon
2014	Viability	Sarah Vap of Venice, California	Mary Jo Bang
2013	Ampersand Revisited	Simeon Berry of Somerville, Massachusetts	Ariana Reines
2013	Trespass	Thomas Dooley of New York, New York	Charlie Smith
2013	Bone Map	Sara Eliza Johnson of Salt Lake City, Utah	Martha Collins
2013	Its Day Being Gone	Rose McLarney of Tulsa, Oklahoma	Robert Wrigley
2013	What Ridiculous Things We Could Ask of Each Other	Jeffrey Schultz of Los Angeles, California	Kevin Young
2012	Visiting Hours at the Color Line	Ed Pavlić of Athens, Georgia	Dan Beachy-Quick
2012	The Cloud that Contained the Lightning	Cynthia Lowen of Brooklyn, New York	Nikky Finney
2012	The Narrow Circle	Nathan Hoks of Chicago, Illinois	Dean Young
2012	the meatgirl whatever	Kristin Hatch of San Francisco, California	K. Silem Mohammad
2012	Failure & I Bury the Body	Sasha West of Austin, Texas	D. Nurkse
2011	The Apothecary's Heir	Julianne Buchsbaum of Lawrence, Kansas	Lucie Brock-Broido
2011	Your Invitation to a Modest Breakfast	Hannah Gamble of Chicago, Illinois	Bernadette Mayer
2011	Green Is for World	Juliana Leslie of Santa Cruz, California	Ange Mlinko
2011	Exit, Civilian	Idra Novey of Brooklyn, New York	Patricia Smith
2011	Maybe the Saddest Thing	Marcus Wicker of Ann Arbor, Michigan	D.A. Powell
2010	The Lifting Dress	Lauren Berry of Houston, Texas	Terrance Hayes
2010	Stutter	William Billiter of Clinton, New York	Hilda Raz
2010	Exhibit of Forking Paths	James Grinwis of Florence, Massachusetts	Eleni Sikelianos
2010	The Lamp with Wings: 60 Love Sonnets	M.A. Vizsolyi of New York, New York	Ilya Kaminsky
2010	A Map Predetermined and Chance	Laura Wetherington of Roanoke, Virginia	C.S. Giscombe
2009	Sarah-Of Fragments and Lines	Julie Carr of Denver, Colorado	Eileen Myles
2009	Here Be Monsters	Colin Cheney of Brooklyn, New York	David Wojahn
2009	Burn Lake	Carrie Fountain of Austin, Texas	Natasha Trethewey
2009	Ideal Cities	Erika Meitner of Blacksburg, Virginia	Paul Guest
2009	The Network	Jena Osman of Philadelphia, Pennsylvania	Prageeta Sharma
2008	If Birds Gather Your Hair for Nesting	Anna Journey of Houston, Texas	Thomas Lux
2008	The Black Automaton	Douglas Kearney of Van Nuys, California	Catherine Wagner
2008	Mixology	Adrian Matejka of Edwardsville, Illinois	Kevin Young
2008	Bird Eating Bird	Kristin Naca of Minneapolis, Minnesota	Yusef Komunyakaa
2008	catch light	Sarah O'Brien of Brookfield, Ohio	David Shapiro
2007	Installations	Joe Bonomo	Naomi Shihab Nye
2007	Spring	Oni Buchanan	Mark Doty
2007	House Held Together by Winds	Sabra Loomis	James Tate
2007	The Cosmopolitan	Donna Stonecipher	John Yau
2007	Collapsible Poetics Theater	Rodrigo Toscano	Marjorie Welish
2006	The Scented Fox	Laynie Browne of Oakland, California	Alice Notley
2006	Novel Pictorial Noise	Noah Eli Gordon of Denver, Colorado	John Ashbery
2006	Veil and Burn	Laurie Clements Lambeth of Houston, Texas	Maxine Kumin
2006	Vertigo	Martha Ronk of Los Angeles, California	C.D. Wright
2006	Nervous Systems	William Stobb of La Crosse, Wisconsin	August Kleinzahler
2005	The Resurrection Machine	Steve Gehrke	T.R. Hummer
2005	The Anatomy Theater	Nadine Meyer	John Koethe
2005	Teahouse of the Almighty	Patricia Smith	Edward Sanders
2005	Three, Breathing	S.A. Stepanek	Mary Ruefle
2005	An Almost Pure Empty Walking	Tryfon Tolides	Mary Karr
2004	The Welcome	David Friedman	Stephen Dunn
2004	leadbelly	Tyehimba Jess	Brigit Pegeen Kelly
2004	PYX	Corinne Lee	Pattiann Rogers
2004	Starred Wire	Ange Mlinko	Bob Holman
2004	Corruption	Camille Norton	Campbell McGrath
2003	Shiva's Drum	Stephen Cramer	Grace Schulman
2003	Citizen	Andrew Feld	Ellen Bryant Voigt
2003	Murder (a violet)	Raymond McDaniel	Anselm Hollo
2003	The White Train	John Spaulding	Henry Taylor
2003	Unrelated Individuals Forming a Group Waiting to Cross	Mark Yakich	James Galvin
2002	Rhythm & Booze: Poems	Julie Kane	Maxine Kumin
2002	Sanskrit of the Body	W. B. Keckler	Mary Oliver
2002	The Monster Lives of Boys and Girls	Eleni Sikelianos	Diane Ward
2002	The Standing Wave: Poems	Gabriel Spera	Dave Smith
2002	Tenderness Shore	Meredith Stricker	Fred Chappell
2001	Year of Morphines: Poems	Betsy Brown	George Garrett
2001	Theory of Devolution: Poems	David Groff	Mark Doty
2001	Hip Logic	Terrance Hayes	Cornelius Eady
2001	Edgewater: Poems	Ruth L. Schwartz	Jane Hirshfield
2001	Pure Descent	Elizabeth Robinson	Fanny Howe
2000	Anthem	Jean Donnelly	Charles Bernstein
2000	That Kind of Sleep	Susan Atefat Peckham	Victor Hernández Cruz
2000	Tremolo: Poems	Spencer Short	Billy Collins
2000	Manderley: Poems	Rebecca Wolff	Robert Pinsky
2000	Asunder	Susan Wood	Garrett Hongo
1999	Madame Deluxe	Tenaya Darlington	Lawson Fusao Inada
1999	Nova	Standard Schaefer	Nick Piombino
1999	Climbing Back	Dionisio D. Martinez	Jorie Graham
1999	Drivers at the Short-Time Motel	Eugene Gloria	Yusef Komunyakaa
1999	Renunciation : Poems	Corey Marks	Philip Levine
1998	Butterfly Effect	Harry Humes	Pattiann Rogers
1998	Atmosphere Conditions	Ed Roberson	Nathaniel Mackey
1998	Looking for the Parade: Poems	Joan Murray	Robert Bly
1998	Beyond Heart Mountain: Poems	Lee Ann Roripaugh	Ishmael Reed
1998	So Often the Pitcher Goes to Water Until It Breaks	Rigoberto González	Ai
1997	Except by Nature	Sandra Alcosser	Eamon Grennan
1997	Tales of Muraski and Other Poems	Martine Bellen	Rosemarie Waldrop
1997	The Origins of Evening: Poems	Robert Gibb	Eavan Boland
1997	Silent Treatment: Poems	Lisa Lewis	Stanley Plumly
1997	Lost Wax: Poems	Heather Ramsdell	James Tate
1996	Red Signature	Mary Leader	Deborah Digges
1996	The Little Door Slides Back: Poems	Jeff Clark	Ray DiPalma
1996	Placebo Effects: Poems	Jeanne Marie Beaumont	William Matthews
1996	The New Intimacy	Barbara Cully	Carolyn Forché
1996	Nine Skies: Poems	A V. Christie	Sandra McPherson
1995	Leaving a Shadow	Heather Allen	Denise Levertov
1995	Response	Juliana Spahr	Lyn Hejinian
1995	Crash's Law: Poems	Karen Volkman	Heather McHugh
1995	Strange Relation	Daniel Hall	Mark Doty
1995	The Broken World: Poems	Marcus Cafagna	Yusef Komunyakaa
1995	Infanta	Erin Belieu	Hayden Carruth
1994	To Give It Up	Pam Rehm	Barbara Guest
1994	Hummock in the Malookas: Poems	Matthew Rohrer	Mary Oliver
1994	The Human Abstract	Elizabeth Willis	Ann Lauterbach
1994	Theater of Animals: Poems	Samn Stockwell	Louise Glück
1993	The Other Man Was Me: A Voyage to the New World	Rafael Campo	Gloria Vando
1993	Most Way Home: Poems	Kevin Young	Lucille Clifton
1993	The Landlady in Bangkok	Karen Swenson	Maxine Kumin
1993	The Other Stars	Rachel Wetzsteon	John Hollander
1993	The High Road to Taos: Poems	Martin Edmunds	Donald Hall
1992	Lost Body	Terry Ehret	Carolyn Kizer
1992	Shorter Poems	Gerald Burns	Robert Creeley
1992	Debt: Poems	Mark Levine	Jorie Graham
1992	What We Don't Know about Each Other	Lawrence Raab	Stephen Dunn
1992	My Alexandria: Poems	Mark Doty	Philip Levine
1991	A Flower Whose Name I Do Not Know	David Romtvedt	John Haines
1991	To Put the Mouth to	Judith Hall	Richard Howard
1991	As If	James Richardson	Amy Clampitt
1991	Good Hope Road	Stuart Dischell	Thomas Lux
1991	The Dig	Lynn Emanuel	Gerald Stern
1990	Words for My Daughter	John Balaban	W.S. Merwin
1990	Questions About Angels: Poems	Billy Collins	Edward Hirsch
1990	Rainbow Remnants in Rock Bottom Ghetto Sky: Poems	Thylias Moss	Charles Simic
1990	The Island Itself	Roger Fanning	Michael Ryan
1990	The Surface: Poems	Laura Mullen	C. K. Williams
1989	Terra Firma	Thomas Centolella	Denise Levertov
1989	Artist and Model	Carol Snow	Robert Hass
1989	The Brother's Country: Poems	Tom Andrews	Charles Wright
1989	Blessings in Disguise	David Clewell	Quincy Troupe
1989	Stubborn: Poems	Roland Flint	Dave Smith
1988	Green the Witch-Hazel Wood	Emily Hiestand	Jorie Graham
1988	After We Lost Our Way	David Mura	Gerald Stern
1988	Black Wings	Len Roberts	Sharon Olds
1988	No mercy	Lee Upton	James Tate
1988	Great Bird of Love: Poems	Paul Zimmer	William Stafford
1987	A Guide to Forgetting	Jeffrey Skinner	Tess Gallagher
1987	Singing Underneath	Jeffrey Harrison	James Merrill
1987	The Good Thief: Poems	Marie Howe	Margaret Atwood
1987	New Math: Poems	Cole Swensen	Michael Palmer
1987	The Hand of God and a Few Bright Flowers	William Olsen	David Wagoner
1986	Cardinals in the Ice Age	John Engels	Philip Levine
1986	Red Roads	Charlie Smith	Stanley Kunitz
1986	Junk City	Barbara Anderson	Robert Pinsky
1986	Little Star: Poems	Mark Halliday	Heather McHugh
1986	Cities in Motion	Sylvia Moss	Derek Walcott
1985	As Long As You're Happy: Poems	Jack Myers	Seamus Heaney
1985	Saints	Reginald Gibbons	Roland Flint
1985	Local Time	Stephen Dunn	Dave Smith
1985	Palladium: Poems	Alice Fulton	Mark Strand
1984	Wild Onion	Robert L. Jones	Carolyn Forché
1984	The Raft	Kathy Fagan	Daniel Halpern
1984	Afterwards	Amy Bartlett	Galway Kinnell
1984	Silver and Information	Bruce Smith	Hayden Carruth
1984	Eroding Witness	Nathaniel Mackey	Michael S. Harper
1983	In the Solar Wind	Wendy Battin	William Matthews
1983	God's Mistress	James Galvin	Marvin Bell
1983	The persistence of memory: Poems	Mary Fell	Madeline DeFrees
1983	Black Dog, Red Dog: Poems	Stephen Dobyns	Robert Hass
1982	The Greater Leisures	Jane Miller	Stanley Plumly
1982	Going On: Selected Poems 1958-1980	Joanne Kyger	Robert Creeley
1982	From the Abandoned Cities	Donald Revell	C.K. Williams
1982	The Hands in Exile	Susan Tichy	Sandra McPherson
1982	Corpse and Mirror	John Yau	
1981	Accidental Weather	Sherod Santos	Charles Wright
1981	Hugging the Jukebox	Naomi Shihab Nye	Josephine Miles
1981	Second Sight	Jonathan Aaron	Anthony Hecht
1981	The Incognito Lounge: And Other Poems	Denis Johnson	Mark Strand
1981	The Mud Actor	Cyrus Cassells	Al Young
1980	Gumbo	George Barlow	Ishmael Reed
1980	The Dollmaker's Ghost	Larry Levis	Stanley Kunitz
1980	Leaving Taos	Robert Peterson	Carolyn Kizer
1980	So This Is the Map	Reg Saner	Derek Walcott
1980	In Winter	Michael Ryan	
1979	Any Body's Song	Joseph Langland	Ann Stanford
1979	The collected poems of Sterling A. Brown	Sterling Allen Brown	Michael Harper
1979	Silks	Roberta Spear	Philip Levine

== See also ==
- American poetry
- List of poetry awards
- List of literary awards
- List of years in poetry
- List of years in literature
