= Ragdale =

Historic house in Illinois, United States

- U.S. National Register of Historic Places
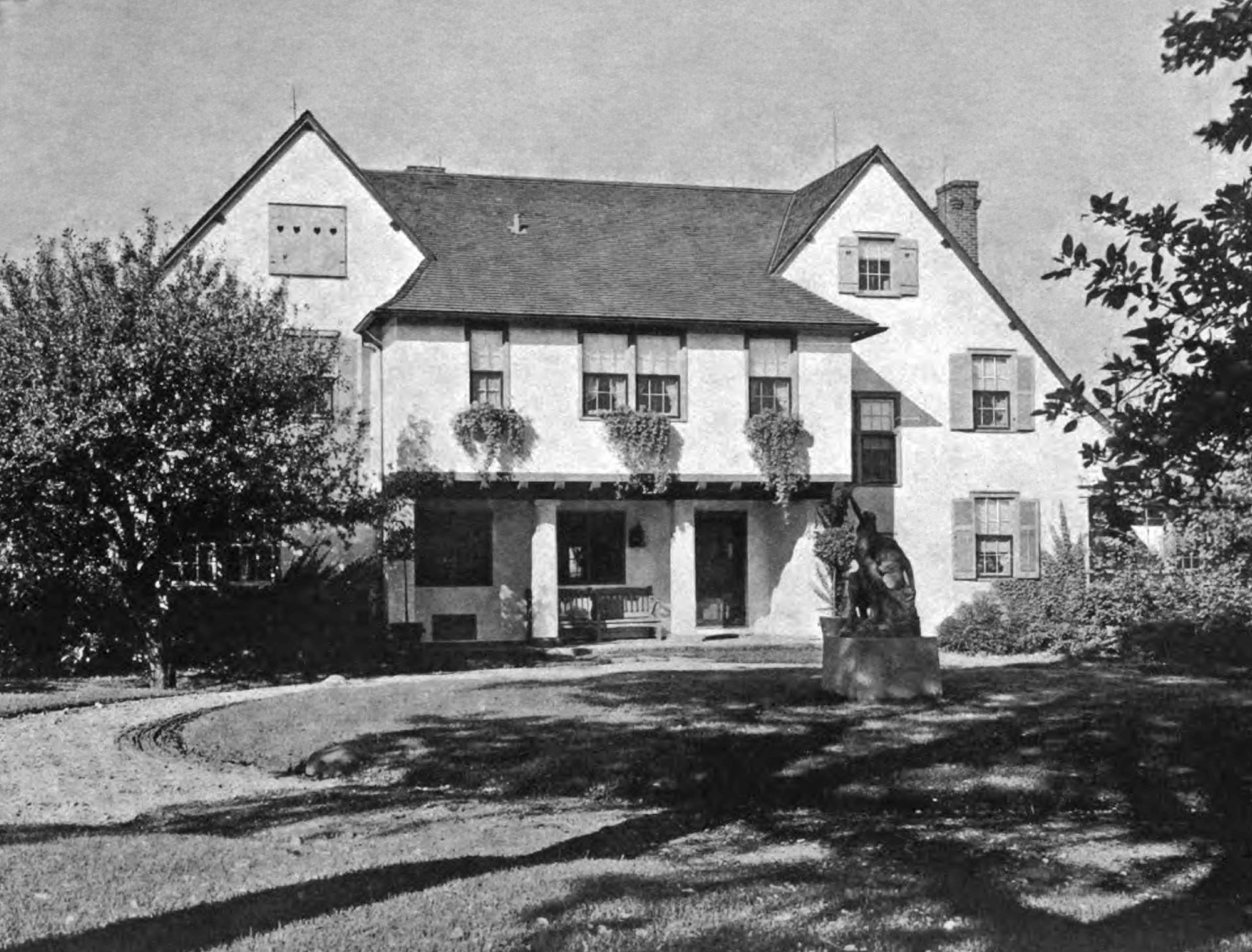
- Ragdale

- Location within Illinois Location within the United States
- Location: 1230 N. Green Bay Rd., Lake Forest, Illinois
- Coordinates: 42°15′45″N 87°51′2″W
- Area: 33 acres (13 ha)
- Built: 1897
- Architect: Howard Van Doren Shaw
- Architectural style: Arts and Crafts
- NRHP reference No.: 76000717
- Added to NRHP: June 3, 1976

Ragdale is the former summer retreat of Chicago architect Howard Van Doren Shaw, located in Lake Forest, Illinois. It is the home of the Ragdale Foundation, an artist residency program that hosts creators from a number of disciplines: nonfiction and fiction writers, composers, poets, play- and screenwriters, visual artists, choreographers, as well as those from interdisciplinary interests.

== The house and barn ==
Built in 1897, the house and barn were built in Shaw's typical Arts and Crafts manner.

Howard Shaw named his new country house 'Ragdale' after an old Tudor house in Leicestershire, England, more because he liked the name itself than because the house was one of his favorites. To him, Ragdale meant meadows and woods and hollow apple trees and country vistas. The raggedy look of the shrubbery, the low hanging branches of trees, and the invasion of the lawn by violets were all deliberate effects. He was aiming for informal country surroundings for his house, not a well-groomed estate.
—Alice Hayes and Susan Moon, Ragdale: A History and Guide.

The property underwent another change in 1912 as the Ragdale Ring was installed; at the outdoor theatre, Shaw's family and friends frequently performed Frances Shaw's works for the Lake Forest community, in the 1930s. Benches were incorporated to accommodate over 200 audience members.

Ragdale was also where Sylvia Shaw Judson (1897–1978), Howard's daughter, sculpted her piece Bird Girl, which is prominently featured on the cover of John Berendt's best-selling nonfiction book Midnight in the Garden of Good and Evil. In 1943, the Meadow Studio was built on the prairie in an effort to accommodate Sylvia's work as a sculptor; in fact, it was here that she formed the Bird Girl as well as a number of other well-known pieces, such as Cats and Summer.

== The Ragdale Foundation ==
In 1976 Shaw's granddaughter, poet Alice Judson Hayes, founded The Ragdale Foundation as a non-profit aimed at providing a place of rest and relaxation for artists of all disciplines.

I am grateful to my mother, Sylvia Shaw Judson, who gave me the house, to the ancestors, relatives, and ghosts with whom I communed when I came back to live there in 1976, to all the artists and writers who by their creativity have validated the idea of the Ragdale Foundation, and to the many people who have helped make the Foundation work. Finally, I am grateful to the house itself for its smell and taste and texture and for the views out of its windows and for its nurturing spirit.
—Alice Hayes, Preface to Ragdale: A History and Guide.

Initially, Hayes ran the foundation with little assistance, managing the landscaping, cooking, and facilities on her own.

In 1980, the Ragdale Foundation was able to obtain the Ragdale Barnhouse from the Preston Family, who had purchased it from Shaw's youngest daughter, Theodora, in the late 1940s, then remodeled it in the 1950s. It is within this converted barn that the Foundation offices are housed.

Hayes donated both the buildings and 5 acres (20,000 m^{2}) of grounds in 1986 to the City of Lake Forest, in an effort to preserve the Ragdale property as well as its environmental integrity.

1991 marked itself as yet another year of progress as the Friends' Studio was built. The space provided a workroom to choreographers, visual artists, composers, and performance artists. Additionally, its well-lit area provided a perfect place for exhibitions and performances.

The Friends Studio was conceived and paid for by Alice Hayes along with Christopher and John Holabird to commemorate the long friendship of their mothers, Sylvia Shaw and Dorothy Holabird. Alice, always focused, had coined the Ragdale motto, 'A place for artists and writers to work.' As there was a growing demand for different kinds of studio space, it was decided to create a composers' studio and a larger studio that could be used by painters, sculptors and dance choreographers. This would be the first new building since the creation of Ragdale and it had to blend in. The site was selected and the design created with a little fear and trepidation. Would the new studio intrude or would it be a complementary addition? The answer came months later in the form of an unintended design critique of the new studio from a former Ragdale resident. She said, 'What did we used to use that building for?' Whew!
—Walker Johnson, architect and former Ragdale Board President

In 2006, the Ragdale Foundation both celebrated its 30th anniversary and mourned the death of Alice Judson Hayes.

On April 9, 2008, the Meadow Studio was reopened, after having been the workspace of Sylvia Shaw Judson. Partnering with 12 fourth- and fifth-year students from the Illinois Institute of Technology College of Architecture under the direction of Associate Professor Frank Flurry, the Foundation was able to utilize the original footprint of the building in constructing a building light on environmental impact. Due to poor roof maintenance in the studio's early years, it was subject to extensive damage—however, the Ragdale Foundation was fortunate in attaining the funds necessary to rebuild it.

=== Notable alumni ===
- Kim Addonizio
- Elizabeth Alexander
- Yehuda Amichai
- A. Manette Ansay
- Francisco Aragón
- Lynda Barry
- Judith Baumel
- Jan Beatty
- Robin Becker
- Star Black (poet)
- Lawrence Block
- Bruce Bond
- Marianne Boruch
- Lan Samantha Chang
- Susan Cheever
- Maxine Chernoff
- Kelly Cherry
- Shimmer Chinodya
- Rita Ciresi
- Barbara Croft
- Moira Crone
- Stanley Crouch
- John Dilg
- Crescent Dragonwagon
- Camille Dungy
- Janice Moore Fuller
- Pamela Gemin
- Kinereth Gensler
- Hector Giuffre (painter)
- Eugene Gloria
- Lauren Groff
- Jane Hamilton
- Martha Hollander
- Nancy Horan
- Ma. Luisa Aguilar Igloria
- Colette Inez
- Halvard Johnson
- Janet Kaplan
- Brigit Kelly
- Carolyn Kizer
- Alex Kotlowitz
- Wlodzimierz Ksiazek
- Jean Kwok
- Anne Laughlin
- Dennis Lehane
- Sabra Loomis
- Sheryl Luna
- Jacki Lyden
- Rebecca Makkai
- Charles Martin
- J. Michael Martinez
- Stephen McCauley
- Sandra McPherson
- Jacquelyn Mitchard
- Lisel Mueller
- Audrey Niffenegger
- John Frederick Nims
- Kathleen Norris
- Camille Norton
- Alice Notley
- Sara Paretsky
- Oliver de la Paz
- Katha Pollitt
- Kim Roberts
- Alice Sebold
- Ravi Shankar
- Alan Shapiro
- Barbara Smith
- Carmen Giménez Smith
- Ann Snodgrass
- David Sosnowski
- John Spaulding
- Mark Strand
- Stephanie Strickland
- Deborah Sullivan
- Gail Tsukiyama
- Luís Alberto Urrea
- Dan Vera
- Mark Winegardner
- Rafael Yglesias
