= Noʻu Revilla =

Hawaiian Poet and Scholar

Noʻu Revilla is a queer Hawaiian femme poet, educator, and scholar. She is the author of several scholarly articles, two chapbooks, and a poetry collection that was the winner of the 2021 National Poetry Series. Her work prioritizes collaboration, aloha, and gratitude. She has performed and facilitated poetry workshops throughout Hawaiʻi as well as Canada, Papua New Guinea, and the United Nations. Currently, Revila is an assistant professor of Creative Writing in the English Department at the University of Hawaiʻi at Mānoa.

== Early life and education ==
Revilla was born and raised in Waiʻehu on the island of Maui. Growing up, she was surrounded by wāhine, fishermen, hula dancers, singers, and storytellers.

Revilla's work has been heavily influenced by Haunani-Kay Trask. Revilla first discovered Trask's work at the Bobst Library at NYU, while studying journalism in 2005. Trask's poetry and use of language informed Revilla's work on love and Aloha ʻĀina. Trask's work, particularly her poem Sons, which approaches the notion of being "slyly / reproductive", is a theme in Revila's approach to queer ʻŌiwi feminist ethos.

Revilla received a B.A. in Women's Studies, a M.A. in English with a concentration in Cultural Studies, and a PhD in Creative Writing at University of Hawai’i at Mānoa.

== Poetry ==
Revilla is the author of Say Throne, a chapbook published by TinFish Press in 2011. This chapbook consists of poems that are described as "meld[ing] sex and sovereignty" by editor Susan Schultz.

Trask's notion of "slyly / reproductive" is also referenced directly in Revilla's chapbook Say Throne in the poem Pull Without Push, which was re-titled as Rope / Tongue when it was reprinted as Poem of the Week by Kore Press in 2016.]

Her next chapbook titled Permission to Make Digging Sounds was published in Effigies III by Salt Publishing in 2019. The Effigies series is an anthology that featured four debut books that weave the work of "Pacific islander women poets from Guam, Hawai’i, and Fiji. Despite their distant origins, all these writers explore culture, history, politics, genealogy, feminism, and the environment."

In 2021, Revilla's full-length poetry collection titled Ask the Brindled was selected by Rick Barot as the winner of the National Poetry Series and was published with Milkweed Editions in 2022. This collection is dedicated to Haunani-Kay Trask and all her "sly siblings.”

This collection is described in a review featured in Poetry Foundation: “Throughout Ask the Brindled, this conflation of the intimate and the political, an embodied queer, decolonial critique is powerfully manifest in the poems’ visceral imagery, their fluidity between English and the Hawaiian language, and in Revilla’s formal strategies.”

== Scholarly work ==
Revilla, in collaboration with Jamaica Heolimeleikalani Osorio, was featured in Detours: A Decolonial Guide to Hawaiʻi, a book published by Duke University in 2019. Their article titled Aloha is Deoccupied Love offers a view of aloha that Revilla and Osorio say demonstrates "a complex set of practices and relationships that keep the integrity of our ʻāina, ʻohana, and lāhui at the center."

In 2020, Revilla co-edited a special issue of Biography: An Interdisciplinary Quarterly. In collaboration with Bryan Kamaoli Kuwada, they co-wrote the introduction, Mana from the Mauna. This journal issue, published by the University of Hawaiʻi Press, was curated by Revilla and Kuwada to highlight the 2019 stand at Puʻuhuluhulu on Hawaiʻi island, the most recent in a long history of ʻŌiwi resistance to development on Maunakea. The contributors of this issue testify to the movement to protect Maunakea, enforcing what the collective believe is worth protecting, and who should be protectors.

== Activism and public presentations ==
From 2012 to 2013, Revilla wrote the visual poem, Altering Papers, in response to the 21 letters written by Queen Lilioukalani and performed this poem at The Honolulu Museum of Art.

Revilla was a part of the Critical Ethnic Studies Association Conference in Toronto in 2015, where she presented on Ea/Breath/Rising: Poetry for Love, Reconnection, and Sovereignty.

In the summer of 2019, Revilla taught poetry at Puʻuhuluhulu University while standing to protect Maunakea with her lāhui. In November of the same year, Revilla attended the 40th National Women's Studies Association conference in San Francisco, where she presented Love Letter to Haunani-Kay Trask in the roundtable session titled Oceanic Indigenous Feminisms: S/Pacific Bodies, Poetics and Politics, which focused on poets, scholars, and activists who practice inter- and transnational feminist politics.

After Haunani-Kay Trask died in 2021, the English Department at the University of Hawaiʻi at Mānoa organized a colloquium entitled Haunani-Kay Trask and the Study of Literature in Hawaiʻi, which featured Brandy Nālani McDougall, Laura Lyons, kuʻualoha hoʻomanawanui, and Revilla as speakers.

Revilla in collaboration with Hawai’i State Poet Laureate Brandy Nālani McDougall and Dana Naone Hall, ʻŌiwi poets of Maui, composed a five-page poem entitled Aia i hea ka wai o Lahaina ("Where is the Water of Lahaina"), which is dedicated to Lahaina and the communities of Maui Komohana (West Maui). Composed as a water song, Aia i hea ka wai o Lahaina connects the August 2023 wildfires on Maui with the history of colonial deforestation and water diversion in Hawaiʻi. Aia i hea ka wai o Lahaina borrows its titular refrain from the beloved ancestral mele (song) He mele no Kāne ("Where is the water of Kāne"), which emphasizes all of the ways that water is sacred and comes to us to give us life. This work was first presented in September 2023 as the opening for Indigenous human rights lawyer Julian Aguon’s Honolulu lecture Gathering Flowers by the Road: An Indigenous Pursuit of Climate Justice.

== Selected works ==
Poetry

- "Kino" (2016)
- "Basket" (2017)
- "After She Leaves You, Femme" (2018)
- "Memory as Missionary Position" (2018)
- "Intergenerational Memory" (2019)
- "threshold" (2020)
- "Myth Bitch" (2020)
- "Mercy" (2020)
- "When You You Say ‘Protestors’ Instead of ‘Protectors’" (2020)
- "Preparing Kaʻuiki" (2021)
- "Sucking Sounds, Pōhai Street" (2022)
- "Eggs" (2022)
- "So sacred, so queer" (2022)
- "The opposite of dispossession is not possession; it is connection" (2022)

In Anthologies

- "lessons in quarantine" (2020)
- "Maunakea" (2020)
- "Shapeshifters Banned, Censored, or Otherwise Shit-Listed, aka Chosen Family Poem" (2020)
- "Welcome to the Gut House" (2022)

Interviews

- "Noʻu Revilla, in Conversation" (2022)
- "The Place of Return: Talking Story with Noʻu Revilla” (2022)
- "The Beauty of Being: Our Eighteenth Annual Look at Debut Poets” (2023)

Translation

- "A Chant for Kekalukaluokēwā" (2019)
