= Steve Gehrke =

American poet (born 1971)

Steve Gehrke (born 1971) is an American poet.

== Life ==
He was raised in Mankato, Minnesota. He graduated from Minnesota State University, and University of Texas-Austin, with an MFA. He graduated from the University of Missouri with a Ph.D., where he studied with Lynne McMahon, and Sherod Santos. He was poetry editor of the Missouri Review. He taught at the University of Missouri, Seton Hall University, and Gettysburg College. He currently teaches in the MFA program at the University of Nevada, Reno.

His work has appeared in The Georgia Review, Indiana Review, and Mississippi Review, The Yale Review, Slate, The Iowa Review, The Kenyon Review. His first collection of poems, The Resurrection Machine, covers a range of topics related to human health, including transplantation (he had kidney failure, and his sister, Gwen, donated a kidney), disease, and the degeneration of the body. It won the 1999 John Ciardi Prize for Poetry. His second book, The Pyramids of Malpighi, won the Philip Levine Prize, judged that year by Philip Levine himself. Michelangelo's Seizure, his third book of poetry, was selected for the 2005 National Poetry Series by T. R. Hummer. Writing in the journal Parnassus, reviewer Leonard Barkan called it "a dazzling success".

== Awards ==
- 1999 John Ciardi Prize for Poetry
- 2002 Philip Levine Prize in Poetry
- 2005 National Poetry Series
- 2009 Lannan Foundation, Marfa Residency

== Works ==
- "Caravaggio's The Death of the Virgin". Blackbird. Fall 2005.
- "From a Distance, I Saw Bird". Blackbird. Fall 2005.
- "From The Machine Gunner's Letters". Blackbird. Fall 2005.
- "Late Self-Portrait". AGNI. April 2005.
- "Vanitas for Robert Mapplethorpe". AGNI. April 2005.
- "Francis Bacon in His Studio". Southwest Review. 90 (2). 2005. Archived from the original on 2009-07-07.
- The Resurrection Machine. Kansas City: BkMk Press, University of Missouri. 2000. ISBN 978-1-886157-21-7.
- The Pyramids of Malpighi. Anhinga Press. 2004. ISBN 978-0-938078-76-0.
- Michelangelo's Seizure. University of Illinois Press. 2007. ISBN 978-0-252-07420-2.

=== Anthologies ===
- Gerald Costanzo; Jim Daniels, eds. (2000). American poetry: the next generation. Carnegie Mellon University Press. ISBN 978-0-88748-343-1.

== Reviews ==
Steve Gehrke also seeks to comprehend beauty in the mystery of the human body, yet Gehrke's search for comfort and understanding leads in rather a different direction than Stevens' abstractions, taking us through an unvarnished look at the body's flaws and failings that is another aspect of its power to inspire awe. Through the eyes of both patients and artists, Steve Gehrke examines "the world in repair." The savage and strange exploration of fragility embodied in this collection of poems nevertheless has the capacity to lend unexpected comforts to a reader faced with an inescapable mortality.
