= George Barlow (American poet) =

American poet

- Born: 1948 (age 77–78)
- Education: California State University, East Bay; University of Iowa
- Occupation: Poet

George Barlow (born 1948) is an American poet. He graduated from California State University, East Bay, and from the University of Iowa with an M.A. in American Studies and a M.F.A. George Barlow currently teaches at Grinnell College.

He has published in The Black Scholar, Caliban 2, River Styx, The Iowa Review, Antaeus, Callaloo, The Beloit Poetry Journal, Nimrod, The American Poetry Review, Yardbird Reader, Big Moon and Obsidian.

He was on the nominating committee for the Iowa poet laureate.

== Awards ==
- Woodrow Wilson Fellowship
- Ford Foundation Fellowship
- 1980 National Poetry Series, for Gumbo

== Works ==
- Gabriel. Broadside Press. 1974. ISBN 978-0-910296-92-2.
- Gumbo. Doubleday. 1981. ISBN 978-0-385-17529-6.

=== Editor ===
- About Time III: An Anthology of California Prison Writing, Grady Hillman, Maude Meehan, George Barlow eds.

=== Anthologies ===
- Arnold Rampersad; Hilary Herbold, eds. (2006). The Oxford Anthology of African American Poetry. Oxford University Press US. ISBN 978-0-19-512563-4.
- Noah Blaustein, ed. (2001). Motion: American Sports Poems. University of Iowa Press. ISBN 978-0-87745-755-8.
- Clarence Major, ed. (1996). The Garden Thrives: Twentieth-Century African-American Poetry. HarperPerennial. ISBN 978-0-06-055364-7.
- Jerry Washington Ward, ed. (1997). Trouble the Water: 250 Years of African-American Poetry. Mentor. ISBN 978-0-451-62864-0.
- Michael Carey, ed. (1996). Voices on the Landscape: Contemporary Iowa Poets. Mid-Prairie Books. ISBN 978-0-931209-65-9.
- Keith Gilyard; Anissa Janine Wardi, eds. (2004). African American Literature. Pearson Longman. ISBN 978-0-321-11341-2.
- Ethelbert Miller, ed. (1999). In Search of Color Everywhere. Illustrator Terrance Cummings. Bt Bound. ISBN 978-0-613-03372-5.
- Al Young, ed. (1994). Color: A Sampling of Contemporary African-American Writing. San Francisco: The Poetry Center and American Poetry Archives, San Francisco State University.
- Michael S. Harper; Anthony Walton, eds. (February 1994). Every Shut Eye Ain't Asleep: An Anthology of Poetry by African Americans Since 1945. Little, Brown & Company. ISBN 978-0-316-34710-5.
- Yusef Komunyakaa; Sascha Feinstein, eds. (June 1991). The Jazz Poetry Anthology. Indiana University Press. ISBN 978-0-253-32163-3.
- William H. Gass; Charles Simic, eds. (1985). The Best of Intro. Associated Writing Programs. ISBN 978-0-936266-06-0.
- Jack Elliott Myers; Roger Weingarten, eds. (1984). New American Poets of the 80s. Wampeter Press. ISBN 978-0-931694-35-6.
- Quincy Troupe; Rainer Schulte, eds. (1975). Giant Talk: Voices of the Third World. Random House. ISBN 978-0-394-48800-4.
- Bruce Taylor, Kendall, ed. (January 1, 1974). Eating the Menu. Hunt Pub. Co. ISBN 978-0-8403-1056-9.
- R. Baird Shuman (ed.). A Galaxy of Black Writing. Moore Publishing Company. ISBN 978-0-04-105300-5.
- Arnold Adoff, ed. (1977). Celebrations: a new anthology of Black American poetry. Follett Pub. Co. ISBN 978-0-695-40699-8.
