= Martin Edmunds =

American poet

- Born: 1955 (age 70–71)
- Occupation: Poet
- Writing career
- Genre: Poetry

Martin Edmunds (born 1955) is an American poet. His work has appeared in the Paris Review, The New Yorker, Ep;phany, and elsewhere.

== Works ==
- "December 27, 1988", AGNI 56, 2002
- The High Road to Taos, University of Illinois Press (1994) ISBN 978-0-252-06404-3

=== Screenplay ===
- Passion in the Desert (1998) (additional script)

=== Anthologies ===
- Nicholas Christopher, ed. (1989). Under 35: The New Generation of American poets. Anchor Book. ISBN 978-0-385-26035-0.
- Ted Hughes; Seamus Heaney, eds. (1982). Arvon Foundation Poetry Competition: 1980 Anthology. Kilnhurst Pub. Co. ISBN 978-0-9508078-0-5.

== Awards ==
- 1993 National Poetry Series, for The High Road to Taos
- 1991 Discovery-The Nation prize
