= Jos Charles =

American poet

jos charles
- Education: University of Arizona (MFA)
- Occupations: Poet; writer; translator; editor
- Writing career
- Language: English
- Genre: Poetry
- Notable works: Safe Space (2016) feeld (2018) a Year & other poems (2022)
- Notable awards: Finalist, Pulitzer Prize for Poetry (2019); Guggenheim Fellowship (2024); Ruth Lilly & Dorothy Sargent Rosenberg Poetry Fellowship (2016)
- Website: Official website

jos charles (stylized in lowercase) is a trans American poet, writer, translator, and editor. Her book feeld won the National Poetry Series, was longlisted for the National Book Award for Poetry, and was a finalist for the Pulitzer Prize for Poetry and the Los Angeles Times Book Prize. In 2024, she received a Guggenheim Fellowship. She currently resides in Long Beach, California. She founded THEM, the first trans literary journal in the United States.

== Early life and education ==
Charles grew up in a conservative Evangelical Christian family, and wrote her first poem, about the Crucifixion, when she was seven years old. She received a Master of Fine Arts degree from the University of Arizona. She is a PhD student in English at the University of California, Irvine.

== Biography ==
Charles's debut poetry collection, Safe Space, was published in 2016 by Ahsahta Press. Her poetry has been published by Poetry, PEN, Washington Square Review, Denver Quarterly, GLAAD, Lambda Literary, The Feminist Wire, Action Yes, Bloom, and The Capilano Review. In 2015 she received the Monique Wittig Writer's Scholarship. In 2016 Charles received a Ruth Lilly & Dorothy Sargent Rosenberg Fellowship through the Poetry Foundation and was a finalist for the Lambda Literary Award for Transgender Poetry.

Her second book, feeld, uses an original vocabulary that combines Middle English and textspeak. Chosen for the National Poetry Series by the poet Fady Joudah, it has been praised for its groundbreaking twist on classic pastoral traditions.

In June 2019, to mark the 50th anniversary of the Stonewall riots, an event widely considered a watershed moment in the modern LGBTQ rights movement, Queerty named her one of the Pride50 "trailblazing individuals who actively ensure society remains moving towards equality, acceptance and dignity for all queer people".

== Publications ==
- Safe Space (Ahsahta, 2016; ISBN 9781934103708)
- feeld (Milkweed, 2018; ISBN 9781571315052; OCLC 1022077889)
- a Year & other poems (US: Milkweed, 2022, ISBN 9781571315472; UK: Broken Sleep Books, 2024, ISBN 9781916938120)
