= Alexandra Lytton Regalado =

Salvadoran-American author

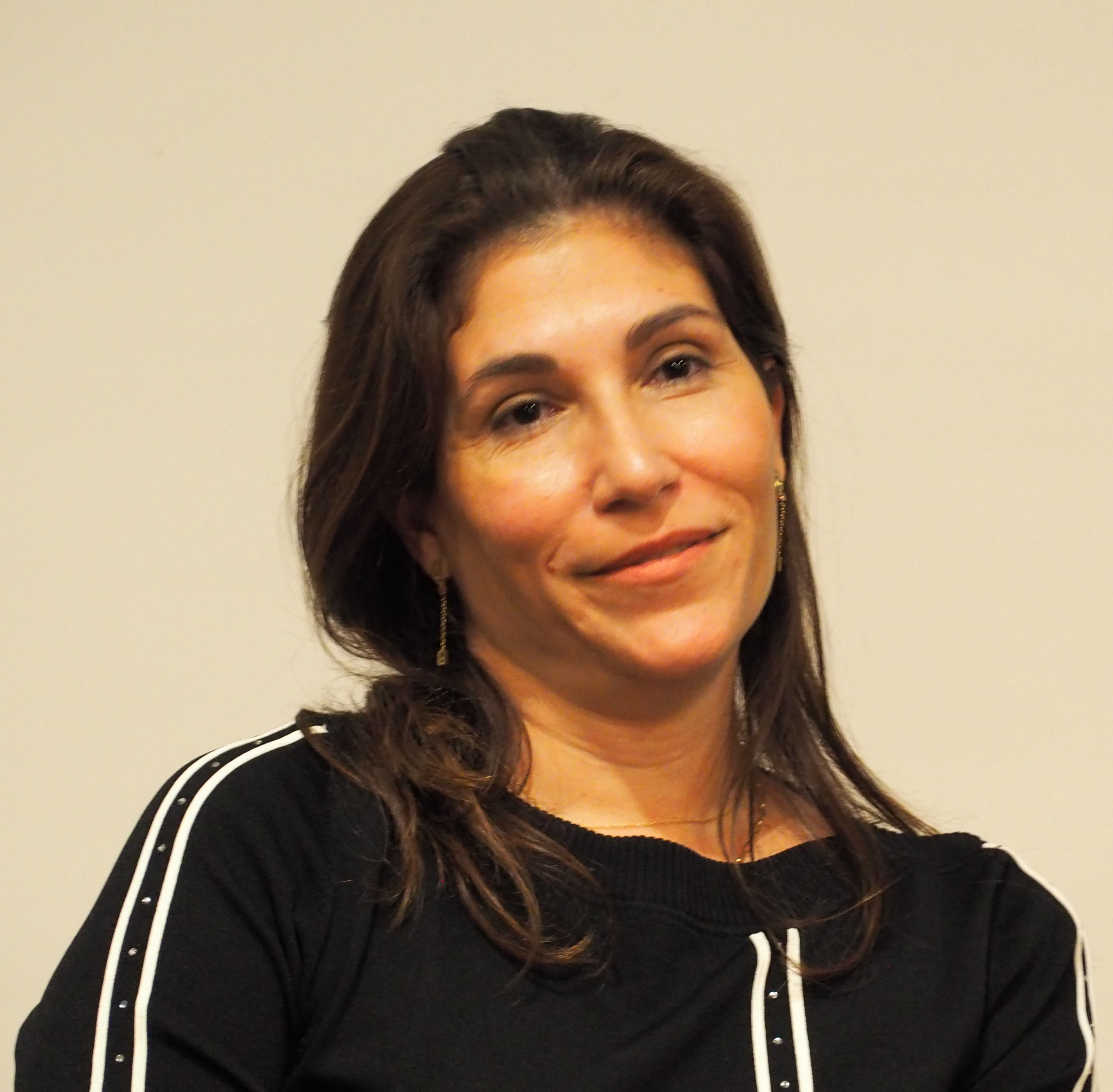
- Alexandra Lytton Regalado reading at busboys and poets, Washington, DC
- Genre: Poetry
- Notable works: Relinquenda
- Notable awards: National Poetry Series, St. Lawrence Book Prize, Coniston Poetry Prize

Website
- www.alexandralyttonregalado.com

Alexandra Lytton Regalado is a Salvadoran-American author, translator, and poet. She is known for her prize-winning books Relinquenda and Matria. She is a CantoMundo fellow, and she won a Coniston prize.

== Early life ==
Lytton Regalado was born in El Salvador but moved to the Miami, Florida in the United States at the age of 7 amidst El Salvador's civil war. She holds an MFA in Poetry from Florida International University and an MFA in fiction Pacific University. She also has a degree in visual art and photography. After living in the US for 24 years, she returned to San Salvador, El Salvador after getting married.

== Career ==
She co-founded Kalina publishing alongside Lucía de Sola in 2006 which published bilingual works by Salvadorans within and outside El Salvador. As an extension of Kalina, she is the Chief Editor-in-Spanish and a translator for La Piscucha Magazine. She has also collaborated to translate Kalina authors such as Kijadurías and Lauri García Dueñas. Similarly, Lytton Regalado was an editor and translator for Vanishing Points / Puntos de Fuga: Contemporary Salvadoran Prose (2017). She edited and translated Vanishing Points: Contemporary Salvadoran Prose (2017).

She is an Associate Editor at Supporting Women Writers in Miami.

Her work appeared in Bomb, poets.org, and The Los Angeles Review, among others.

== Awards ==
Lytton Regalado's most recent work, Relinquenda was a winner of the 2021 National Poetry Series and was chosen by Reginald Betts. Her earlier work Matria won the St. Lawrence Book Award from Black Lawrence Press. She also won the Coniston Poetry Prize in 2015 as selected by Lynn Emmanuel.

== Works ==
- Relinquenda, Beacon Press, 2022. ISBN 9780807007105
- Piedra, La Chifurnia, 2022.
- Matria, Black Lawrence Press, 2017. ISBN 9781625579652
- Puntos de fuga: Prosa salvadoreña contemporánea / Vanishing Points: Contemporary Salvadoran Prose, Executive Editor, published by Editorial Kalina, El Salvador, 2017. ISBN 9789996179037
- La Medusa, and: La Doña, Cream City Review, 2016.
- Teatro bajo mi piel, Una Antología de poesía contemporánea salvadoreña / Theatre Under My Skin, An Anthology of Contemporary Salvadoran Poetry, Executive Editor, 291 pages, published by Editorial Kalina, El Salvador, 2014. ISBN 9789992387672
