= Gabriel Spera =

American poet

- Education: Cornell University; University of North Carolina at Greensboro (MFA)
- Occupation: Poet
- Website: gabrielspera.com

Gabriel Spera is an American poet.

== Life ==
He graduated from Cornell University, and from University of North Carolina at Greensboro, with an M.F.A.

He lives in Los Angeles.

His work appeared in Cimarron Review, Prairie Schooner, The Missouri Review,

== Awards ==
- 2009 National Endowment for the Arts, Fellowship
- 2005 Dana Awards, finalist
- 2005 Dogwood Poetry Prize, finalist
- 2004 PEN USA-West Literary Book Award for Poetry
- 2003 Pushcart Prize Nomination
- 2002 National Poetry Series
- 1995 Villa Montalvo Biennial Poetry Competition, Honorable Mention
- 1991 Associated Writing Programs, Intro Award,
- 1989 Randall Jarrell Fellowship, UNC-G,

== Works ==
- "In a Field Outside the Town". Poetry. April 1999.
- The Standing Wave. Harper Perennial. 2003. ISBN 978-0-06-054182-8.
- Come, go with me. University of North Carolina at Greensboro. 1991.

=== Anthology ===
- Joseph Parisi; Stephen Young, eds. (2002). The Poetry anthology, 1912-2002: ninety years of America's most distinguished verse magazine. Ivan R. Dee. ISBN 978-1-56663-468-7.
- Rita Dove; David Lehman, eds. (2000). The Best American poetry, 2000. Scribner. ISBN 978-0-684-84281-3.
