= David Friedman (poet) =

American poet (1938–2021)

- Born: 1938; Washington, D. C., U.S.
- Died: February 6, 2021 (aged 82–83)
- Education: Cornell University; Columbia University
- Occupation: Poet
- Writing career
- Genre: Poetry

David Joel Friedman (1938 – February 6, 2021) was an American poet.

Friedman was a poet whose work won recognition, including the 2012 Augury Books Editors’ Prize for his collection Soldier Quick with Rain.

Soldier Quick with Rain is known for its inventive use of language and unusual images.

Friedman died on 6 February 2021, at the age of 82–83.

== Life ==
He was raised in Washington, D.C., and studied at Cornell University, and Columbia University.

He lived in New York City.

== Awards ==
- 2004 National Poetry Series, for The Welcome

== Works ==
- "Welcome", Poetry Daily
- The Welcome: poems. University of Illinois Press. 2006. ISBN 978-0-252-07292-5.

== Reviews ==
Fact is, though, writers like Friedman show that some people are actually willing to plant something in the ground that has been broken by prose poets like Maxine Chernoff, Charles Simic and James Tate. Not to say that The Welcome is derivative – rather that it is aware of what has gone before it, that it is the continuation of a noble tradition of smart, witty, accessible yet intelligent prose poetry. In a literary climate where most poets just want credit for breaking new ground, no matter how many times it's been broken already, this would be enough in itself.
