= Karen Swenson =

American poet and journalist (born 1936)

- Born: July 29, 1936 (age 90); New York City, U.S.
- Education: Barnard College; New York University
- Occupations: Poet; journalist

Karen Swenson (born July 29, 1936 New York City) is an American poet and journalist.

== Life ==
She grew up in Chappaqua, New York, and studied at Barnard College and New York University.

Swenson has been Poet-in-Residence at Skidmore College, the University of Idaho, University of Denver, Clark University, Scripps College and Barnard College. She taught at City College, New York.

Her work has appeared in The New York Times, The Beloit Poetry Journal, Paris Review, American Poetry Review, "Saturday Review", and "The New Yorker".

== Awards ==
- 1993 National Poetry Series, for The Landlady in Bangkok
- Lannan Residency
- Yaddo Residencies

== Works ==
- A daughter's latitude: new & selected poems. Copper Canyon Press. 1999. ISBN 978-1-55659-094-8.
- The landlady in Bangkok. Copper Canyon Press. 1994. ISBN 978-1-55659-067-2.
- A sense of direction. Smith. 1989. ISBN 978-0-912292-85-4.
- East-West: poems. Confluence Press. 1980. ISBN 978-0-917652-23-3.
- An attic of ideals. Doubleday. 1974. ISBN 978-0-385-08073-6.

=== Stories ===
- James O'Reilly; Larry Habegger, eds. (2002). "Roaches and Redheads". Travelers' Tales Thailand: True Stories. Travelers' Tales. ISBN 978-1-885211-75-0.

=== Anthologies ===
- Hilda Raz, ed. (2001). "I Have Lost the Address of my Country". Best of Prairie schooner: fiction and poetry. Translator Hilda Raz. University of Nebraska Press. ISBN 978-0-8032-8972-7.

=== Edited ===
- Sarah M. Anderson; Karen Swenson, eds. (2002). Cold counsel: women in Old Norse literature and mythology : a collection of essays. Routledge. ISBN 978-0-8153-1966-5.
