= S. A. Stepanek =

American poet (1960–2019)

- Born: July 1, 1960
- Died: October 6, 2019 (aged 59)
- Education: Iowa Writers' Workshop (MFA); University of Houston (PhD)
- Occupation: Poet

Sally Anna Stepanek (July 1, 1960 – October 6, 2019) was an American poet. She graduated from the Iowa Writer's Workshop with an M.F.A. and from the University of Houston with a Ph.D. Stepanek taught at Wheaton College.

She was on a panel at the 2007 Association of Writers & Writing Programs. Stepanek won the 2005 National Poetry Series award.

== Awards ==
- 2005 National Poetry Series, for Three, Breathing selected by Mary Ruefle

== Works ==
- Three, Breathing. Wave Books. 2006. ISBN 978-1-933517-12-4.
