= Robert Gibb (poet) =

American poet

Robert Gibb (born September 5, 1946) is an American poet. Gibb won the 1997 National Poetry Series Open Competition for The Origins of Evening. It, along with his next two books, comprise what Gibb calls The Homestead Trilogy, a nearly 100-poem cycle probing the fading industrial history and culture of America's Steel City.

== Life ==
He was born to a family of steelworkers in Homestead, Pennsylvania, a mill town six miles south of downtown Pittsburgh along the Monongahela River. The town was home to Andrew Carnegie's famous Homestead Steel Works and site of the infamous Homestead Strike.

Gibb earned a Bachelor of Fine Arts at Kutztown University of Pennsylvania in 1971, a Master of Fine Arts at the University of Massachusetts Amherst in 1974, and his Master of Arts and Ph.D. at Lehigh University in 1976 and 1986, respectively.

== Works ==
- "Hummingbird". The New Yorker. May 25, 2009.
- "Industrial Landscapes". Ploughshares. Spring 2004. Archived from the original on March 8, 2006.
- What the Heart Can Bear: Selected and Uncollected Poems, 1979–1993. Autumn House Press. August 1, 2009. ISBN 978-1-932870-30-5.
- World Over Water. Fayetteville: The University of Arkansas Press. 2007. ISBN 978-1-55728-836-3.
- The Burning World. Fayetteville: The University of Arkansas Press. 2004. ISBN 978-1-55728-765-6.
- The Origins of Evening, poetry (New York: W. W. Norton, 1998)
- Fugue for a Late Snow. Columbia: University of Missouri Press. 1993. ISBN 978-0-8262-0861-3.
- Momentary Days, poetry (Camden: Walt Whitman Center, 1989)
- A Geography of Common Names. Aiken: Devil's Millhopper Press. 1987. ISBN 978-1-889806-00-6.
- Entering Time, Barnwood Press, poetry (Daleville: Barnwood Press, 1986)
- The Winter House, poetry (Columbia: University of Missouri Press, 1984)
- The Names of the Earth in Summer, poetry (Menemsha: Stone Country, 1983)
- The Margins, poetry (Menemsha: White Bear Books, 1979)
- Whale Songs. Cranston: Turkey Press. 1976. ISBN 978-0-918824-17-2.

=== Anthologies ===
- Brooke Horvath; Tim Wiles, eds. (2002). "Williams in Autumn". Line drives: 100 contemporary baseball poems. SIU Press. ISBN 978-0-8093-2440-8.

== Reviews ==
Peter Oresick wrote:

Move over, John Edgar Wideman. Poet Robert Gibb's "The Homestead Trilogy," now completed, takes its place alongside "The Homewood Trilogy" in the canon of Pittsburgh literature. World Over Water concludes a fiercely ambitious cycle of Pittsburgh poems – nearly 100 in all – in the project Gibb began 10 years ago with "The Origins Of Evening," selected by Eavan Boland as winner of the 1997 National Poetry Series and published by Norton.
