= Carol Snow =

American poet

Carol Snow is an American poet.

== Life ==
In 2002, she was resident poet at the University of California, Berkeley.

She lives in San Francisco.

== Awards ==
- 1989 National Poetry Series, for Artist and Model, selected by Robert Hass
- Poetry Center Book Award),
- Joseph Henry Jackson Award in Literature
- Poetry Fund grant
- Pushcart Prize
- National Endowment for the Arts Fellowship.

== Works ==
- "Respecting", Electronic Poetry Review
- Artist and Model. Atlantic Monthly Press. January 1991. ISBN 978-0-87113-400-4.
- Breath as: short poems. Em Press. 1994. ISBN 978-0-9632085-6-9.
- For. University of California Press. April 2000. ISBN 978-0-520-21783-6.
- The seventy prepositions: poems. University of California Press. 2004. ISBN 978-0-520-24081-0.
- Placed: Karesansui Poems. Counterpath Press. 2008. ISBN 978-1-933996-09-7.

=== Anthologies ===
- Billy Collins, ed. (2003). Poetry 180: a turning back to poetry. Random House, Inc. ISBN 978-0-8129-6887-3.
- Carol Snow (2002). "Le Dejeuner". In Phyllis Stowell; Jeanne Foster (eds.). Appetite: food as metaphor : an anthology of women poets. BOA Editions. p. 25. ISBN 978-1-929918-24-9.
