= Heather Ramsdell =

American poet and playwright

Heather Ramsdell is an American poet and playwright.

Her work appears in Conjunctions and Verse. She lives in Williamsburg, New York.

== Awards ==
- 1997 National Poetry Series, for Lost Wax: Poems

== Works ==
=== Poetry ===
- "from Vague Swimmers", DC Poetry, 2001
- "Good Sheep", DC Poetry, 2001
- Lost wax: poems. University of Illinois Press. 1998. ISBN 978-0-252-06706-8.

=== Plays ===
- The Situation Room

=== Anthologies ===
- Gerald Costanzo; Jim Daniels, eds. (2000). American poetry: the next generation. Carnegie Mellon University Press. ISBN 978-0-88748-343-1.
- Reginald Shepherd, ed. (2004). The Iowa anthology of new American poetries. University of Iowa Press. ISBN 978-0-87745-908-8.
- Mary Margaret Sloan, ed. (January 1998). Moving Borders: Three Decades of Innovative Writing by Woman. Talisman House Publishers. ISBN 978-1-883689-47-6.
