= Kathy Fagan =

American poet

- Education: California State University, Fresno (BA); Columbia University (MFA); University of Utah (PhD)
- Occupation: Poet
- Website: www.kathyfagan.net

Kathy Fagan Grandinetti is an American poet.

== Biography ==
Fagan earned a B.A. in English from California State University, Fresno in 1980. She holds an M.F.A. from Columbia University and a Ph.D. from the University of Utah. She teaches at Ohio State University. Her poems have appeared in AGNI, The Paris Review, FIELD, The Kenyon Review, Slate, Ploughshares, The New Republic, Shenandoah and The Missouri Review.

== Awards ==
- National Endowment for the Arts Fellowship
- Ingram Merrill Foundation Fellowship
- Ohio Arts Council Fellowship
- 2018 Shortlisted for the Kingsley Tufts Poetry Award and William Carlos Williams Award,
- 2017 Ohio Poet of the Year
- 2017 Raymond J. Hanley Award
- 2004 Ohioana Award for Editorial Excellence.
- 1998 Vassar Miller Prize for Poetry, for Moving & St Rage
- 1985 The Frost Place poet in residence
- 1984 National Poetry Series Award, for The Raft

== Works ==
- Bad Hobby. Milkweed Editions. 2022. ISBN 978-1-57131-545-8.
- Sycamore. Milkweed Editions. 2017. ISBN 978-1-57131-473-4.
- Lip. Eastern Washington University Press. 2009. ISBN 978-1-59766-049-5.
- Greatest hits, 1983-2003. Pudding House Publications. 2003. ISBN 978-1-58998-200-0.
- The Charm. Zoo Press. 2002. ISBN 978-0-9708177-4-7.
- Moving & St Rage. University of North Texas Press. 1999. ISBN 978-1-57441-066-2.
- The Raft. Dutton. 1985. ISBN 978-0-525-24326-7.

=== Anthologies ===
- Nicholas Christopher, ed. (1989). Under 35: The New Generation of American Poets. Anchor Book. ISBN 978-0-385-26035-0.
- Christopher Buckley; Gary Young, eds. (1999). Geography of Home: California and the Poetry of Place. Heyday Books. ISBN 978-1-890771-19-5.
- "Moving & St Rage". Extraordinary Tide: Contemporary Poetry by American Women. Columbia. 2001. ISBN 978-0-231-11962-7.
- Virgil Suárez; Ryan G. Van Cleave, eds. (2001). American Diaspora. University of Iowa Press. ISBN 978-0-87745-746-6.
- The Breath of Parted Lips: 25 Years of Poems from the Frost Place. CavanKerry Press. 2001. ISBN 978-0-9678856-2-9.
- William J. Walsh, ed. (2006). Under the rock umbrella: contemporary American poets, 1951-1977. Mercer University Press. ISBN 978-0-88146-047-6.
