= William Stobb =

American poet

William Stobb (born 1970) is an American poet and author of essays and short fiction. He is a professor of English at the University of Wisconsin–La Crosse, and an editor at Conduit magazine and Conduit Books and Ephemera.

Stobb's first poetry collection was a chapbook, For Better Night Vision, published by the Black Rock Press at the University of Nevada. His first full-length book, Nervous Systems, was selected by August Kleinzahler for the National Poetry Series, and published by Penguin Books in 2007. Absentia (Penguin) and Artifact Eleven: Desert Fragments (Black Rock Press) appeared in 2011. In 2018, Stobb's poetry collection You Are Still Alive won the 42 Miles Press poetry prize, and was published in 2019.

Stobb's work has appeared in American Poetry Review, Colorado Review, Conduit, Denver Quarterly, DIAGRAM, Kenyon Review, Lit Hub, and Mississippi Review, among other publications. In 2025, his work appeared in the critical anthology Afterlives of the New York School of Poets: An Anthology (Routledge), edited by Angela Ball. Stobb has received poetry awards and fellowships from the Academy of American Poets and the Nevada Arts Council, as well as the Editors' Prize from Spoon River Poetry Review for his poem "A Moment for Authentic Shine." Stobb's short story, "All the Bodies," won the 2019 Zona Gale Award from the Council of Wisconsin Writers for best short story by a Wisconsin author. In 2025, Stobb's critical essay on Michael Heizer's earthwork City appeared in North American Review. Stobb creates audio art that can be heard on SoundCloud. His early podcast, "Hard to Say," was presented by miPOradio from 2004–2010. Stobb has presented at the Association of Writers & Writing Programs (AWP) Conference.

Stobb was born in Little Falls, Minnesota, and studied at the University of North Dakota and the University of Nevada.

== Awards ==
- 1994 Academy of American Poets' Thomas McGrath Award
- 2000 Nevada Arts Council Poetry Fellowship
- 2006 National Poetry Series
- 2012 Spoon River Poetry Review Editors' Prize.
- 2014 Science Fiction Poetry Association Long Form Prize
- 2016 Science Fiction Poetry Association Long Form Prize
- 2019 Council for Wisconsin Writers Zona Gale Award for Short Fiction
- 2019 42 Miles Press Book Award

== Bibliography ==
=== Poetry collections ===
- Nervous Systems. Penguin Books. 2007. ISBN 978-0-14-311199-3.
- Absentia. Penguin Books. 2011. ISBN 0143120182.
- You Are Still Alive. 42 Miles Press. 2019. ISBN 1732851107.

=== Poetry chapbooks ===
- For Better Night Vision: Poems. Reno: Black Rock. 2001. University of Nevada.
- Artifact Eleven: Desert Poems. Reno: Black Rock. 2011. ISBN 1891033549. University of Nevada.
