= Tenaya Darlington =

American writer

- Born: 1971 (age 54–55)
- Occupations: Writer, associate professor
- Awards: National Poetry Series (1999)

Academic background
- Education: Beloit College (BA); Indiana University Bloomington (MFA)

Academic work
- Discipline: Food writing, fiction, poetry, creative nonfiction, journalism
- Institutions: Saint Joseph's University

Tenaya Darlington (born 1971) is an American writer as well as associate professor at Saint Joseph’s University in Philadelphia, Pennsylvania. Her general fields of professional interest include food writing, fiction, poetry, creative nonfiction, and journalism. She is the author of six books.

== Life ==
She graduated from Beloit College, and Indiana University Bloomington, with a Master of Fine Arts, in 1997.

She worked as a food critic, and writer for Isthmus Newspaper, the alternative weekly in Madison, Wisconsin, where she wrote a biweekly culture column about the bizarre, called “On the Loose.”.

She was a visiting writer at DePauw University. She teaches at St. Joseph's University.

Her work has appeared in Bomb, Image Journal, Hayden's Ferry Review.

She has worked with her brother, Andre Darlington, on a number of cocktail books.

== Awards ==
- 1999 National Poetry Series, for Madame Deluxe
- Great Lakes Colleges Association New Writer’s Award.

== Blog ==
In 2010 Tenaya began a dairy diary on Blogger to go along with a class she was teaching. Tenaya is now an avid cheese blogger also known as Madame Fromage. "Madame Fromage has just one goal, you see? To help you fall hopelessy in love with cheese. Just as she has."

== Works ==
=== Poetry ===
- Madame Deluxe. Coffee House. 2000. ISBN 978-1-56689-105-9.

=== Articles ===
- Bee a Good Neighbor: Urban Apiaries' Honey Could Hardly be More Local, Buzzing in from City Rooftops and Bottled by Zip Code. The Philadelphia Inquirer. 2011.
- Food Desert: North Philly Still Lacks Fresh Food Access. Grid Magazine. 2009. Archived from the original on 2015-06-10.
- Daily Dish: Farm to Philly Hosts Bloggers Who Eat Locally, Seasonally. Grid Magazine. 2009. Archived from the original on 2013-11-13.
- Whole Hog. Ecotone. 2007. Archived from the original on 2015-06-10.

=== Novel ===
- Di Bruno Bros. House of Cheese, A Guide to Wedges, Recipes, and Pairings. Running Press. 2013. p. 17. ISBN 978-0-7624-4604-9.
- Maybe Baby. Back Bay Books (Little, Brown & Co.). 2004. ISBN 978-0-316-00075-8.

=== Anthologies ===
- Raphael Kadushin, ed. (2005). "A Patch of Skin". Barnstorm: contemporary Wisconsin fiction. Terrace Books. ISBN 978-0-299-20854-7.
- Brett Fletcher Lauer; Aimee Kelley, eds. (2004). Isn't it romantic: 100 love poems by younger American poets. Verse Press. ISBN 978-0-9746353-1-6.

=== Cocktail Books ===
- The New Cocktail Hour. Running Press. 2016. ISBN 978-0762457267.
- Turner Classic Movies: Movie Night Menus. 2016. ISBN 978-0762460939.
- Booze and Vinyl. Running Press. 2018. ISBN 978-0-7624-6347-3.

== Reviews ==
Some poets aren't satisfied with plain clothes or plain language, they turn their metaphors into absurdist imaging or trace an elliptical line of thought. But, sometimes, they simply paint their face perfectly seductive and then smear it, walk out in public with mad sexhair not just for show but for a sense of bawdy, over-the-top control of the world remembered/encountered. Tenaya Darlington is one such poet and her debut, Madame Deluxe, is full of such brash and brazen flaunt.
