= Raymond McDaniel =

American poet

- Born: Florida, U.S.
- Education: University of Michigan (MFA)
- Occupation: Poet

Raymond McDaniel (born in Florida) is an American poet, author of four poetry collections, all published by Coffee House Press: The Cataracts (2018), Special Powers and Abilities (2013), Saltwater Empire (2008), and Murder (a Violet) (2004). Murder (a Violet) was a National Poetry Series winner selected by Anselm Hollo. He graduated from University of Michigan in 1995, with an MFA. He teaches at the University of Michigan, and writes book reviews for The Constant Critic.

== Published works ==
Full-Length Poetry Collections

- The Cataracts. Coffee House Press. 2018. ISBN 978-1-56689-493-7.
- Special Powers and Abilities. Coffee House Press. 2013. ISBN 978-1-56689-315-2.
- Saltwater Empire. Coffee House Press. 2008. ISBN 978-1-56689-213-1.
- Murder (a violet). Coffee House Press. 2004. ISBN 978-1-56689-165-3.
