= Standard Schaefer =

American poet (born 1971)

Standard Schaefer (born 1971) is an American poet.

== Life ==
Standard grew up in Houston, Texas. He graduated from the Kinkaid School of Houston in 1990, and after high school he attended Occidental College, graduating with a Bachelor of Arts.

He is an independent journalist, a free-lance writer, and a contributor to CounterPunch. His first book, Nova, was selected for the National Poetry Series in 1999 and published by Sun and Moon Books. His second book, Water & Power, was published by Agincourt Books. His poetry and criticism have appeared in several U.S. anthologies, and two international ones.

He taught at Otis College and after living in San Francisco, California, Standard and his wife moved to Portland, Oregon.

His work appears in Boston Review, The New Review of Literature, The Washington Review, Aufgabe, Interim, Fence, Rain Taxi, New American Writing, Fence, Non, Ribot, X-Connect, Epoch, and Rosebud. He co-edited the literary journals Rhizome with Evan Calbi and Ribot with Paul Vangelisti. He is the non-fiction editor of The New Review of Literature.

He and his wife live in Portland, Oregon, where he is working on a master's degree in Media Studies.

== Awards ==
- 1999 National Poetry Series, for Nova

== Works ==
- "Regression to Mean: An Elegy for New Orleans", Slope #22, Fall/Winter 2005
- "GALVESTON"; "RED HEADED STRANGER"; "AUGUST 21, 1971"; "PINE"; "OCCIDENTAL", Fence, Volume 2
- "REAGAN IS DEAD"; "MY STINT IN THE ACLU", Octopus Magazine
- "from nova suite, iv, part 6", Cross Connect
- "The Birds Sing to Plato"; "Socrates (A Hasty Reply)"; "Upon Entering"; "Aristotle in the Thinkery"; "The Boy in the Back of the Room or The Young Paremenides"; "At the Registrar"; "The Birds Sing to the Boy"; "The Boy at the Back of the Room Sings to the Birds"; "Aristophanes to Aristotle: Concerning First Books Or How I Think We Met "; "Aristophanes"; "A Few Words from Parmenides", Gut Cult, Issue 6
- Nova. Sun & Moon Press. 2001. ISBN 978-1-55713-404-2.
- Water and Power. Agincourt Press. 2005. ISBN 978-1-56886-107-4.

=== Criticism ===
- "Ropes of Light", Jacket 32, April 2007
- Edward Foster; Joseph Donahue, eds. (2002-01-01). "The World in Time and Space". Talisman. Talisman House. ISSN 0898-8684.

=== Edited ===
- Leslie Scalapino (2000). Paul Vangelisti; Standard Schaefer (eds.). Ribot Music. Sun & Moon Press. ISBN 978-1-928801-00-9.
- Embarrassment of Survival: Selected Poems 1970-2000. Marsillio. 2001. ISBN 978-1-56886-101-2.
