= A. V. Christie =

American poet (1963–2016)

- Born: Ann Victoria Christie; February 2, 1963 Redwood City, California, U.S.
- Died: April 7, 2016 (aged 53) West Chester, Pennsylvania, U.S.
- Occupation: Poet
- Education: Vassar College (AB); University of Maryland, Baltimore (MFA)

Ann Victoria "A V." Christie (February 2, 1963 – April 7, 2016) was an American poet.

== Life ==
Ann Victoria Christie was born in Redwood City, California. She was raised in California's San Francisco Bay area as well as in Montana, and British Columbia. A graduate of Vassar College, she received her Master of Fine Arts degree from the University of Maryland. She was a visiting writer and writer-in-residence at colleges along the Pennsylvania Main Line and regionally, including Villanova and La Salle universities; Bryn Mawr College; Goucher College in Baltimore; the University of Maryland, College Park; and Penn State Abington.

Her first poetry collection, Nine Skies, won the 1996 National Poetry Series prize. The poet Henri Cole described it as "hard-bitten, luxuriant and true," and the Philadelphia-area poet Eleanor Wilner called it "diamond-faceted, elliptical." W.S. DiPiero said of her 2014 collection The Wonders that "her poems invoke and respect strangeness and make strangeness feel near."

Her poems, reviews, and interviews appeared in AGNI, American Poetry Review, Poetry, Excerpt, Iowa Review, Commonweal, The Journal, Ploughshares, and Prairie Schooner.

Her collection The Housing (2004) was co-winner of the Robert McGovern Publication Prize. The Wonders (2014), a chapbook-length poem and Editor's Selection, was published by Seven Kitchens Press. Her chapbook And I Began to Entertain Doubts was published in May 2016 by Folded Word Press.

== Death ==
Christie died of breast cancer in West Chester, Pennsylvania, aged 53.

== Awards ==
- 1997 National Poetry Series, for Nine Skies
- 2004 Robert McGovern Publication Prize co-winner, for The Housing
- National Endowment for the Arts Fellowship
- Maryland State Arts Council Fellowship
- Pennsylvania State Arts Council Fellowship
- Ludwig Vogelstein Fellowship

== Works ==
- Nine Skies. University of Illinois Press. 1997. ISBN 978-0-252-06644-3.
- The Housing. Ashland Poetry Press. 2004.
- The Wonders. Seven Kitchens Press. 2014.
- And I Began to Entertain Doubts. Folded Word Press. 2016. ISBN 978-1-610-19601-7.

=== Anthologies ===
- Michael Collier, ed. (2000). The New American Poets. University Press of New England.
