= David Romtvedt =

American poet

- Education: Reed College; Iowa Writers' Workshop
- Occupation: Poet
- Spouse: Margo Brown
- Children: 1

David Romtvedt is an American poet.

== Life ==
He graduated from Reed College, and the Iowa Writers' Workshop. He teaches at University of Wyoming. He lives in Buffalo, Wyoming, with his wife, the potter Margo Brown. His daughter, Caitlin Belem, plays Brazilian and Latin music with the band Maracuja.

His work has appeared in The Sun Magazine, The American Poetry Review, The Paris Review, Ploughshares, Prairie Schooner, The Missouri Review, and the Basque cultural review Erle.

He is a founder and current board member of Worlds of Music. Romtvedt plays button accordion with the band The Fireants. They have recorded three CDs: Bury My Clothes, Ants on Ice and It's Hot. The band plays Latin and Cajun/Zydeco music as well as original music that David Romtvedt has written.

== Awards ==
- 1991 National Poetry Series, for A Flower Whose Name I Do Not Know
- Pushcart Prize
- two National Endowment for the Arts Fellowships
- Wyoming Arts Council literature fellowship
- Wyoming Governor's Arts Award.

== Works ==
- Dilemmas of the Angels. Baton Rouge, LA: Louisiana State University Press. 2017. ISBN 978-0-8071-6580-5
- Zelestina Urza in Outer Space. Reno, NV: Center for Basque Studies. University of Nevada. 2015. ISBN 978-1-935709-61-9.
- Buffalotarrak. Reno, NV: Center for Basque Studies. University of Nevada. 2011. ISBN 978-1-935709-14-5.
- Some Church. Minneapolis, MN: Milkweed Editions. 2005. ISBN 1-57131-422-9.
- Windmill: Essays from Four Mile Ranch. Santa Fe, NM: Red Crane Books. 1997. ISBN 1-878610-62-7.
- Certainty: Poems. Fredonia, NY: White Pine Press. 1996. ISBN 1-877727-59-8.
- A Flower Whose Name I Do Not Know: Poems. Port Townsend, WA: Copper Canyon Press. 1992. ISBN 1-55659-046-6.
- Crossing Wyoming. Fredonia, New York: White Pine Press. 1992. ISBN 978-1-877727-23-8.
- Yip, a Cowboy's Howl. Spartanburg, SC: Holocene Books. 1991.
- Letters from Mexico. Missoula, MT: Kutenai Press. 1988. ISBN 0-937459-04-6.. Illustrated by Pat Weyer.
- How Many Horses. Memphis, TN: Ion Books. 1988. ISBN 0-938507-15-X.
- Moon: Poems (1984). St. Paul, MN: Bieler Press. ISBN 0-931460-16-6. Illustrated by R W Scholes.
- Free and Compulsory for All: Tales. Port Townsend, WA: Graywolf Press. 1984. ISBN 0-915308-50-9.

=== Anthologies ===
- John Bradley, ed. (1995). "Eating Dinner at My Sister's". Atomic ghost: poets respond to the nuclear age. Coffee House Press. p. 181. ISBN 978-1-56689-027-4. "David Romtvedt."
- Sam Hamill, ed. (1996). The gift of tongues: twenty-five years of poetry from Copper Canyon Press. Copper Canyon Press. ISBN 978-1-55659-116-7.

=== Editor ===
- Michael Shay; David Romtvedt; Linn Rounds, eds. (2003). Deep West: A literary tour of Wyoming. Greybull, WY: Pronghorn Press. ISBN 0-9714725-7-2.
- David Romtvedt, ed. (2007). Wyoming Fence Lines. Wyoming Humanities Council. ISBN 978-0-9789829-1-1.
