= Tryfon Tolides =

American poet

Tryfon Tolides (born Korifi Voiou, Greece) is a Greek-American poet, author of An Almost Pure Empty Walking (Penguin, 2005). His poems have appeared in literary journals and magazines including America, Atlanta Review, Mwondo Greco, Poetry Daily, Washington Square Review, and Worcester Review. He studied at Boston University, and Tunxis Community College, and graduated from University of Maine with a BFA, and Syracuse University with an MFA. He lives in Farmington, Connecticut.

== Honors and awards ==
- 2005 National Poetry Series selection (awarded by his college professor)
- 2009 Lannan Foundation Marfa residency

== Published works ==
- An Almost Pure Empty Walking. Penguin Books. 2006. ISBN 978-0-14-303709-5.
