= Spencer Short =

American poet

Spencer Ryun Short is an American poet.

== Life ==
Short graduated from James Madison University, the University of Michigan and the Iowa Writers' Workshop, where he was awarded a Teaching Writing Fellowship. His collection of poetry, Tremolo, was a winner of the 2000 National Poetry Series, selected by Billy Collins. It was published by HarperPerennial in 2001.

He studied law at the University of Chicago. While in law school, he worked for the MacArthur Justice Center and as a teaching assistant for law professor Cass Sunstein. He also aided prominent civil rights (and MacArthur Justice Center) attorney Joseph Margulies on his book, Guantanamo and the Abuse of Presidential Power. He currently works as an attorney at Skadden, Arps, Slate, Meagher and Flom in New York. He lives in Brooklyn.

== Critical reception ==
Emily Nussbaum, reviewing Tremolo for The New York Times, noted ""a prickly stir of humor, philosophy and romantic giddiness," and that "reading this book is something like walking into a kitchen at a party and coming upon a wild charmer you'd never met, mid-gesticulation -- a terrific storyteller, but also one eager to switch gears mid-sentence, mid-phrase, mid-thought." According to Nussbaum, "Short is genuinely funny -- a rare and beautiful quality among contemporary poets." Cal Bedient, reviewing Tremolo in the Boston Review, found "a clawing power of invention." Travis Nichols, reviewing Tremolo in Jacket, called it "a singular achievement, both astute and warm, that hopefully represents only the first meditation in an ongoing and fruitful emergency." In 2003, Short was included in the Poetry Society of America's New American Poets festival honoring the "most interesting recent first book poets." His poems have been included in several anthologies.

== Awards ==
- 2000 National Poetry Series Open Competition with Tremolo (published in 2001 by HarperCollins).

== Works ==
- Tremolo. HarperPerennial. 2001.
