= Betsy Brown =

American poet

Betsy Brown (born 1963) is an American poet.

== Life ==
She is from Oshkosh, Wisconsin. She graduated from the University of Arizona in 1984.

She graduated from the Iowa Writers' Workshop. She lives in Minneapolis, Minnesota.

Her work has been published in American Poetry Review, Seneca Review.

== Awards ==
- 2001 National Poetry Series, for Year of Morphine

== Works ==
- "Dignity in the Home", poets.org
- Year of morphines: poems. Louisiana State University Press. 2002. ISBN 978-0-8071-2782-7.

=== Anthologies ===
- Joyce Sutphen; Connie Wanek; Thom Tammaro, eds. (2006). To Sing Along the Way: Minnesota Women Poets from Pre-Territorial Days to the Present. New Rivers Press. ISBN 978-0-898232-32-5.
