= Andrew Feld =

American poet

- Born: 1961 (age 64–65); Cambridge, Massachusetts, U.S.
- Education: University of Houston
- Occupation: Poet
- Writing career
- Subject: Poetry

Andrew Feld (born 1961 in Cambridge, Massachusetts) is an American poet.

== Life ==
He graduated from the University of Houston, with an MFA. Currently, he teaches at University of Washington, and is the editor of The Seattle Review. His work has appeared in AGNI, The Nation, New England Review, The Paris Review, Poetry, Triquarterly, The Virginia Quarterly Review, The Yale Review. Feld currently lives in Seattle, Washington.

== Awards ==
- 2003 National Poetry Series
- Wallace Stegner Fellowship from Stanford University
- "Discovery", The Nation Award

== Works ==
- "Little Viral Song", Seattle Poetry Chain
- "On Fire", Virginia Quarterly Review, Spring 2002
- "The Drunk Singer (II)", Virginia Quarterly Review, Spring 2002
- "Quarters", Gulf Coast: A Journal of Literature and Fine Arts
- Raptor. University of Chicago Press. April 2012.
- Citizen. Harper Perennial. June 29, 2004. ISBN 978-0-06-072603-4.
- The lie of the land: poems. University of Houston. 1998.

=== Anthologies ===
- Michael Dumanis; Cate Marvin, eds. (2006). Legitimate dangers: American poets of the new century. Sarabande Books. ISBN 978-1-932511-29-1.
- Paul Muldoon; David Lehman, eds. (2008). "19--: An Elegy". The best American poetry, 2005. Simon and Schuster. ISBN 978-0-7432-5738-1.
- Bill Henderson, ed. (2004). Pushcart prize XXIX, 2005: best of the small presses. W. W. Norton & Company, Incorporated. ISBN 978-1-888889-39-0.
- Bill Henderson, ed. (1999). The Pushcart prize XXX, 2006: best of the small presses. Pushcart Press. ISBN 978-1-888889-19-2.
