= William Olsen =

American Poet

William Olsen (born Omaha, Nebraska) is an American poet.

== Life ==
He was raised in Park Forest, Illinois.

His poems and essays have appeared in Chicago Review, "Crazyhorse", "Gettysburg Review", "The Kenyon Review", "The Nation", The New Republic, Paris Review, "Poetry", "Poetry Northwest", Southern Review, TriQuarterly, and elsewhere. He teaches at Western Michigan University, and the MFA Program at Vermont College.

== Awards ==
- 2005 Guggenheim Fellowship
- Breadloaf Fellowships
- National Endowment of the Arts Creative Writing Fellowship
- Nation/Discovery Award
- The Texas Institute of Arts Award

== Works ==
- TechnoRage. TriQuarterly: Northwestern University Press. 2017. ISBN 978-0-8101-3512-3.
- Sand Theory. TriQuarterly: Northwestern University Press. 2011. ISBN 978-0-8101-5217-5.
- "Infinity", Ploughshares, Spring 2004
- Avenue Of Vanishing. TriQuarterly: Northwestern University Press. 2007. ISBN 978-0-8101-5182-6.
- Trouble Lights. TriQuarterly. 2002. ISBN 978-0-8101-5106-2.
- Vision of a Storm Cloud. TriQuarterly. 1996. ISBN 978-0-8101-5044-7.
- The Hand of God and a Few Bright Flowers. University of Illinois Press. 1988. ISBN 978-0-252-06001-4.

=== Editor ===
- William Olsen; Jack Ridl, eds. (2013). Poetry in Michigan / Michigan in Poetry. New Issues Poetry & Prose. ISBN 978-1-9369-7016-2.
- Sharon Bryan; William Olsen, eds. (2003). Planet on the table: poets on the reading life. Sarabande Books. ISBN 978-1-889330-91-4.

=== Anthologies ===
- Jack Elliott Myers; Jack Elliott Myers; Roger Weingarten, eds. (1991). New American poets of the 90's. D.R. Godine. ISBN 978-0-87923-892-6.
- Michael Collier; Stanley Plumly, eds. (1999). "Face". The New Breadloaf Anthology of Contemporary Poetry. UPNE. ISBN 978-0-87451-950-1.
- Roger Weingarten; Richard Higgerson, eds. (2001). Poets of the New Century. David R. Godine Publisher. ISBN 978-1-56792-178-6.
