= Laurie Clements Lambeth =

American poet

- Born: Newport Beach, California, U.S.
- Education: Loyola Marymount University (BA); University of Houston (MFA, PhD)
- Occupation: Poet

Laurie Clements Lambeth is an American poet, specializing in the topic of disability. She was raised in Laguna Beach and Palos Verdes, California. She graduated from the University of Houston with an MFA and PhD. Her work has appeared in The Paris Review, Indiana Review, Mid-American Review, Seneca Review, and The Iowa Review. She lives in Houston, Texas.

== Life ==
Laurie Clements Lambeth was born in Newport Beach, and grew up in places like Laguna Beach, Santa Ynez, and Palos Verdes. She was diagnosed with relapsing-remitting multiple sclerosis at seventeen years of age. This event in her life influenced her to become a poet. Lambeth has shared her personal story on the National MS Society Website, where she discusses her disease and its influence on her poetry: "I was diagnosed at the age of 17, so MS has defined much of my adult life. I consider what goes on in my body an important factor of who I am; we are intricately linked, MS and me" . One of her symptoms from her disease is numbness. She explains that "living with numbness opened my perception of what is me and what is outside of me". According to Lambeth, if she had not been diagnosed with MS and had not gone through the many symptoms that have made her more aware of who she is, she probably would not have continued writing poetry. She writes poetry that looks into the individual body's form within the context of the world. She went on to graduate with a BA from Loyola Marymount University, Los Angeles, California, as well as an MFA and PhD in creative writing at the University of Houston, where she was awarded the Michener Fellowship and Inprint Fellowship, in honor of Donald Barthelme. Lambeth has appeared in many journals during her career, such as The Paris Review, Indiana Review, Mid-American Review, Seneca Review, and The Iowa Review. She has also produced a popular book of poetry entitled Veil and Burn. She has recently appeared in the anthology Beauty is a Verb: The New Poetry of Disability. She currently lives in Houston, Texas, with her husband and dog, where she works on her poetry and is an avid horsewoman, having ridden and trained horses competitively for many years.

== Awards ==
- 2006 National Poetry Series
- Runner-up for Iowa Award in Nonfiction, The Iowa Review
- Barthelme and Michener fellowships

== Works ==
- "Retrobulbar", Verse Daily
- "Symptoms*", Disability Studies Quarterly
- Veil and Burn. University of Illinois Press. 2008. ISBN 978-0-252-07503-2.
- Beauty is a Verb: The New Poetry of Disability. Cinco Puntos Press. 2011. ISBN 978-1-935955-05-4.

== Reviews ==
- Veil and Burn:

From the opening lines of Veil and Burn readers know they are in for something special and not the usual first book of poems. Laurie Clements Lambeth has given us a book of poetry about disability that is at once both searing and sensuous. This in itself may not seem surprising coming from a poet who is the book review editor for the Disability Studies Quarterly, but what one does not necessarily expect is the deftness of the organizational structure.

A simple online search of Laurie Clements Lambeth will bring up the most popular topic that is spoken about her, her novel Veil and Burn. As a writer with a disability her novel is described as being: "Concerned with physical experience, pain, and disability, Veil and Burn illuminates an intense desire to feel through the Other, embrace it, become it, and in the transformation, to understand the suffering body. In poems about animals, artifacts, and monsters, Lambeth displays a fascination for all bodies while exploring their pain, common fate, alienation, and abilities. Hovering between poem and prose fragment, between the self and fellow creatures, Laurie Clements Lambeth celebrates physical sensation, imbuing it with lyric shape, however broken, however imprisoned the shape may be." Her poetry is very much involved with her disability and what it "celebrates".

Most of the reviews or descriptions of this book involve the progressive loss of vision. Lambeth, in an interview, also expresses how "the prose fragments explore vision loss and fear of blindness, something I felt was too melodramatic or maudlin for poetry, their positioning against the poems and their spar[s]eness are what I feel bring the book together through tension—what can and can’t be sung". Her view of a subject being "melodramatic" shows that Lambeth does not see her disability as something about which to be overly dramatic. Much of her work deals with the symptoms and sensations that MS has brought her. Veil and Burn is also supposed to be an unraveling of what MS does to her body's functioning. It "is not an ode to false hope, a cheery eyeing of her place in heaven, or a Spartan vow to overcome. It is a clear-eyed seeing of the worth of the material world". Lambeth does not seem to be a poet who writes for a disability movement or create sympathy towards people with a disability and she does not try to play with the notion of being strong and overcoming the struggles that MS has brought her.

An interesting thing to find out about her book is the reason why she named it the way she did. "The title Veil and Burn then speaks to these two modes—more effusive poems and spare prose—and enlarges the concept of "Gauze Fragment," which seeks representation of my vision loss in an old Hollywood trick: veiling the camera lens to soften wrinkles in close-up and burning the veil with a cigarette to let the actor's wet eyes sparkle through". This stands as a reassurance of her perhaps more positive perception of herself and MS as they coexist and her eyes are opened to the beauty and life that occurs with MS.

- Beauty is a Verb: The New Poetry of Disability:

In her opening poetics, "Reshaping the Outline," in her section of the anthology, Beauty is a Verb: The New Poetry of Disability, Laurie Clements Lambeth describes a conversation she had with her doctor, in which her doctor informed her that writing was not going to make her MS better, to which she replied, "Oh, I’m perfectly aware of that. I’m under no illusions that anything at all will make me better." She goes on to say of that experience, "I wanted to tell her that my writing and my disease have existed side by side from the moment I was diagnosed at seventeen, my new physical life giving birth to my life in words". Lambeth explains that she has experienced a deepened sense of disability since she has been writing about it in her poetry. For her, this process sets something undesirable aside, so that she can "investigate it, sculpt it, and create something outside of my body that is vividly physical, in subject and in form". One can see this in her poetry without being told. Her poetry embodies a movement and physicality that enlivens the subject matter and heightens the sense of disability that comes with MS.

This is particularly true in her poems, "Hypoesthesia" and "Dysaesthesia," which she put into this anthology because "these narrative lyrics attempt to describe lack of sensation (numbness), or the feeling of pain without source, dyseasthesia: “wrong feeling"...the feeling in each is a sense of hesitancy, disruption in fluidity, reflective of the inability to share physical experience, even at our most intimate or domestic movements." These poems serve to describe her MS in a very physical form, allowing the reading to come close to an understanding of her disability. The movement of lines and the subject matter are compelling as insights into Lambeth’s life.

However, perhaps, of the poetry Laurie Clements Lambeth includes in this anthology, nothing is more manifesting of her disability than the poetry that does not seem to manifest it at all, for example, "The Shaking." Due to the fact that "The Shaking" is a carefully constructed villanelle describing the frustrations of her shaking, we are forced to see how she carefully manipulates her experiences to oppose the shaking she must come to terms with. There is a sense of catastrophe waiting behind the shaking that emotionally rips her from those she loves in the earthquake of her nervous system. She seem to be reminding herself that it seems worse than it is, and yet as it worsens, she wonders if she will have the strength to continue. As comfort fades into panic in the face of the future, containing the experience and eliminating the physical shaking from her poetry allows her to discuss it in an organized way, enforced by the complicated structure of the villanelle. As she deals with her "unfair" disease, it seems that the only thing really "strong enough to hold back its shaking" is the complicated structure of her contained poems that allow her to stop shaking long enough to come to terms with it.
