= Samn Stockwell =

American poet

Samn Stockwell is an American poet.

== Life ==
She lives in Marshfield, Vermont. She has published poetry in Ploughshares, Prairie Schooner, Rhino, Seneca Review, and The New Yorker.

== Awards ==
- 1994 National Poetry Series, for Theater of Animals

== Works ==
- "To Utopia", AGNI
- "Beholder", Ploughshares, Spring 2003
- "Exoskeleton"; "Five P.M."; "DMQ Review"
- Theater of Animals. University of Illinois Press. 1995. ISBN 978-0-252-06476-0.
- Recital. Elixir Press. 2004-01-01. ISBN 978-1-932418-08-8.

=== Anthologies ===
- Nina Kossman, ed. (2001). "Aphrodite at Solstice". Gods and mortals: modern poems on classical myths. Oxford University Press US. ISBN 978-0-19-513341-7.
