= Teresa K. Miller =

American poet

Teresa K. Miller is an American poet.

Born and raised in Seattle, Washington, Miller graduated from Barnard College and the Mills College MFA program. She is the author of the poetry book sped (Sidebrow, 2013). The poetry chapbook Forever No Lo (Tarpaulin Sky, 2008). With Tanya Kerssen, she co-edited the anthology Food First: Selected Writings from 40 Years of Movement Building (Food First Books, 2015) for the Institute for Food and Development Policy. She has published poems and essays in ZYZZYVA, AlterNet, Entropy, DIAGRAM, Common Dreams, Empty Mirror, and elsewhere.

Miller is a winner of the 2020 National Poetry Series. Former California Poet Laureate Carol Muske-Dukes selected her manuscript Borderline Fortune for publication by Penguin in 2021. She has previously placed as a finalist with two other manuscripts.
