= James Grinwis =

American writer specialising in poetry

- Born: United States
- Occupation: Poet

James Grinwis is an American writer specialising in poetry, best known for the book Exhibit of Forking Paths. He has also produced very short stories.

== Early life ==
Grinwis graduated from Kent School in 1990. He also graduated from the MFA Program for Poets & Writers. He attended Hamilton College before graduate school at the University of Massachusetts-Amherst.

== Awards ==
- 2010 National Poetry Series selection for Exhibit of Forking Paths

== Works ==
- City From Nome (National Poetry Review Press, 2011)
- Exhibit of Forking Paths (Coffee House, 2011)

== Reaction ==
Publishers Weekly praised Exhibit of Forking Paths for poems that are "fun, disjunctive, and seem improvisatory, while also sturdy". James Heflin has described how Grinwis "piles images into mad quilts that instantly intrigue, and later tumble into intuitive meaning".
