= Mark Yakich =

American poet

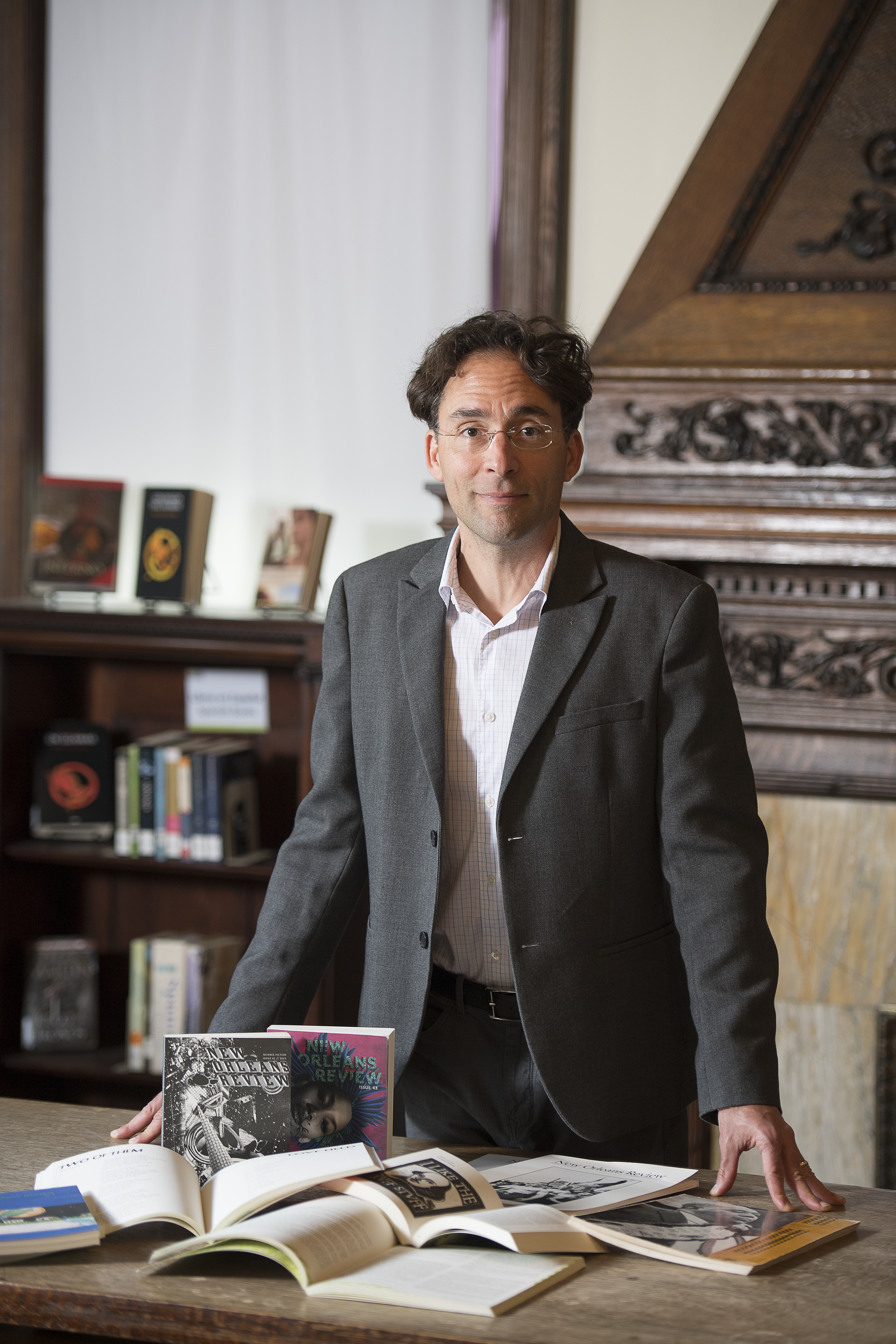
- Mark Yakich, Latter Library, New Orleans, 2017.

Academic work
- Discipline: English studies / Poetry
- Institutions: Loyola University New Orleans

Mark Yakich is an American poet, novelist, painter, and the Gregory F. Curtin, S.J., Distinguished Professor of English at Loyola University New Orleans. Yakich co-founded and co-edits Airplane Reading, a media venue dedicated to collecting travelers' stories about flight. He is director of Loyola's Center for Editing & Publishing. From 2012-2020, he was editor of New Orleans Review.

== Awards ==
His collection of poems Unrelated Individuals Forming a Group Waiting to Cross was one of five winners of the National Poetry Series in 2003. Another collection, The Making of Collateral Beauty, won the Snowbound Chapbook Award and was published by Tupelo Press in 2006. He has also published The Importance of Peeling Potatoes in Ukraine (Penguin Poets, 2008), Green Zone New Orleans (Press Street, 2008), and Spiritual Exercises (Penguin Poets, 2019). Yakich's first novel, A Meaning for Wife, was named by the National Book Critics Circle as the No. 1 Small Press Highlight for 2011.

Yakich was a Fulbright Fellow (2011–12) and taught in the School of Letters at the University of Lisbon, Portugal. He was a Resident Fellow (summer 2022) at The American College of the Mediterranean, Aix-en-Provence.

In 2019, Yakich was awarded the Dux Academicus award, Loyola University's highest honor given to a faculty member by their peers.

== Books ==
- Unrelated Individuals Forming a Group Waiting to Cross. Penguin Books. 2004. ISBN 978-0-14-200451-7.
- The Making of Collateral Beauty. Tupelo Press. 2006. ISBN 978-1-932195-22-4.
- The Importance of Peeling Potatoes in Ukraine. Penguin Books. 2008. ISBN 978-0-14-311333-1.
- Green Zone New Orleans. Press Street. 2008. ISBN 978-0-9777681-2-7.
- Checking In/Checking Out. NO Books. 2011. ISBN 978-0-615-46640-8.
- A Meaning for Wife. Ig Publishing. 2011. ISBN 978-1-935439-41-7.
- Poetry: A Survivor's Guide. Bloomsbury. 2015. ISBN 978-1-5013-0949-6.
- Airplane Reading. Zero Books. 2016. ISBN 978-1-78279-818-7.
- The Dangerous Book of Poetry for Planes. Eyewear. 2017. ISBN 978-1-911335-38-2.
- Interviews from the Edge: 50 Years of Conversations about Writing and Resistance. Bloomsbury. 2019. ISBN 978-1-5013-4745-0.
- Spiritual Exercises. Penguin Poets. 2019. ISBN 978-0-14-313327-8.
- Football (Soccer). Bloomsbury. 2022. ISBN 978-1-5013-6706-9.
- Poetry: A Survivor's Guide (Second ed.). Bloomsbury. 2022. ISBN 978-1-5013-7620-7.
- Little Data (with Christopher Schaberg). Red Flag. 2024.
- The Poetry Reader: An Anthology. Bloomsbury. 2025.
