= Roger Fanning =

American poet

- Born: Millington, Tennessee, U.S.
- Occupation: Poet

Roger Fanning (born 1962 in Millington, Tennessee) is an American poet.

== Life ==
He teaches in the low-residency Warren Wilson MFA program out of Goddard College. He lives in Seattle with his wife and son.

His work is noted for its ironic sincerity and exaltation of the mundane.

== Awards ==
- 1992 Whiting Award
- National Poetry Series for The Island Itself

== Works ==
=== Books ===
- The Island Itself. Penguin Books. 1992. ISBN 978-0-14-058689-3. (1st edition 1991)
- Homesick. Penguin Poets. 2002. ISBN 978-0-14-200052-6.
- The Middle Ages. Penguin Books. 2012. ISBN 978-0-14312-034-6.

=== Anthologies ===
- Michael Collier, ed. (2000). "The Space Needle". The new American poets. UPNE. ISBN 978-0-87451-964-8.

=== Poems ===
- "Australia"; "Henry", The Drunken Boat, spring 2000
- "Poet's Choice: Hospital Sidewalk." Selected by Mary Karr. The Washington Post, October 19, 2008
