= Barbara Cully =

American poet (born 1955)

- Born: 1955 (age 70–71); San Diego, California, U.S.
- Occupation: Poet

Barbara Cully (born 1955 in San Diego, California) is an American poet.

== Life ==
She has taught at the Prague Summer Writers' Program, and teaches at the University of Arizona. She is a contributing editor of Cue.

== Awards ==
- 1996 National Poetry Series Open Competition, for The New Intimacy
- Arizona Commission on the Arts Fellowship
- Writer-in-Residence for the YMCA Writer's Voice.

== Works ==
- "Night Fishing"; "Organizing a Piece of Cheese", Spork Press
- "Repressed Theme", Berkeley
- "You your day...", University of Arizona Poetry Center
- Desire Reclining. Penguin Books. 2003. ISBN 978-0-14-200343-5.
- The New Intimacy. Penguin. 1997.
- Shoreline Series. Kore Press. 1997. ISBN 978-1-888553-05-5. (chapbook)

=== Anthology ===
- Louise Gluck, ed. (1993). The Best American Poetry 1993. New York: Collier Books. ISBN 978-0-02-069846-3.
