= Sarah O'Brien =

American poet

- Writing career
- Genre: Poetry

Sarah O'Brien is an American poet.

== Life ==
Her work has appeared in Eleven Eleven.

== Awards ==
- 2008 Cleveland State University Poetry Center first book finalist
- 2008 National Poetry Series, selected by David Shapiro

== Works ==
- Catch Light. Coffee House Press. September 28, 2009. ISBN 978-1-56689-237-7.

=== Translations ===
- Sekiguchi, Ryoko. Heliotropes. Translator Sarah O'Brien. La Presse Books. ISBN 978-1-934200-20-9.

=== Anthologies ===
- "3,785 Page Pirated Poetry Anthology", Poetry Foundation
