= Corinne Lee =

American writer

Corinne Lee (Corinne Lee Greiner) is the author of short stories, poems, and essays.

== Biography ==
A graduate of Palos Verdes High School, Lee was also educated at the University of Southern California, Harvard University, the Iowa Writers' Workshop, Columbia University, and the University of Texas at Austin.

Her book PYX won the National Poetry Series and was published by Penguin. Lee was chosen in 2007 by the Poetry Society of America as one of the top ten emerging poets in the United States. Six of her poems were featured in Best American Poetry 2010.

Her eco-epic, Plenty, was also published by Penguin and was listed at the 2016 Texas Book Festival.

Lee is a Master Naturalist and an environmental activist.

== Works ==
- "The Narrows," "Lysistrata Motley," "Ten Cents A Dance", foame
- "Lysistrata Motley", Poets & Writers
- PYX. Penguin Books. 2005. ISBN 978-0-14-303551-0.
