= Amy Bartlett =

American poet and poetry editor

Amy Wyllys Bartlett
- Born: March 18, 1949; Concord, Massachusetts, U.S.
- Died: February 29, 2004 (aged 54)
- Education: Vassar College (AB, 1972); * New York University (MA, 1985)
- Occupations: Poet, poetry editor
- Writing career
- Language: English
- Genre: Poetry
- Notable work: Afterwords
- Notable awards: 1984 National Poetry Series

Amy Wyllys Bartlett (March 18, 1949 – February 29, 2004) was an American poet and poetry editor.

== Life ==
She grew up in Concord, Massachusetts. She graduated from Vassar College in 1972, and from New York University with a master's degree in 1985.

She served on the Board of Directors of Poets House and as poetry editor of Tin House Magazine.

Her work appeared in Tin House

Her papers are held at Vassar College.

== Awards ==
- 1984 National Poetry Series, for Afterwords

== Works ==
- Afterwards. New York: Persea Books. 1985. ISBN 0-89255-091-0.
