= Stephen Cramer =

American poet

- Writing career
- Genre: poetry

Stephen Cramer is an American poet.

== Life ==
He teaches at the University of Vermont.

His work appeared in Atlanta Review, Cimarron Review, Green Mountains Review, Hayden's Ferry Review, Mid-American Review, New York Quarterly, and Southwest Review.

He is with the American poets opposed to the death penalty.

== Awards ==
- 2008 grant from the Vermont Arts Council.
- 2003 National Poetry Series

== Works ==
- Shiva's drum: poems. University of Illinois Press. 2004. ISBN 978-0-252-07204-8. "Stephen Cramer."
- Tongue and groove. University of Illinois. 2007. ISBN 978-0-252-03236-3.
