= Jean Donnelly =

American poet

- Education: George Mason University
- Occupation: Poet
- Writing career
- Notable awards: National Poetry Series (2000)

Jean Donnelly is an American poet.

== Life ==
Jean Donnelly studied poetry at the creative writing program at George Mason University, where she co-founded the journal So To Speak: A Feminist Journal of Language & Art.

Her work appeared in Big Allis, Fence, The Germ, Lingo, Situation, and Volt.

She has co-curated the In Your Ear reading series at the District of Columbia Arts Center, and has taught poetry at Georgetown University.

She lives in Exeter, New Hampshire.

== Awards ==
- 2000 National Poetry Series, for Anthem

== Works ==
- "from ANTHEM", Beltway Poetry Quarterly, Volume 3, Number 1, Winter 2002.
- "li", Limetree
- "Gg", Germ
- Anthem. Sun & Moon Press. 2002. ISBN 978-1-55713-405-9.
- The Julia Set. Edge Books. 1995. ISBN 978-0-9619097-6-5. (chapbook)

=== Anthologies ===
- Catherine Wagner; Rebecca Wolff, eds. (2007). Not for mothers only: contemporary poems on child-getting & child-rearing. Fence Books. ISBN 978-0-9771064-8-6.
- DC Poetry Anthology 2000.

== Reviews ==
Jean Donnelly’s debut volume, Anthem, presents an unusually cohesive, finely conceived examination of contemporary American life from the perspective of an innovative, community-minded poet. The poet is also a mother — a fact most often relegated to bio-note relevance but which in this case is actually central to the poetry itself.
