= John Spaulding (poet) =

American poet

- Born: Hanover, New Hampshire, U.S.
- Education: University of Arizona (MA, PhD); Boston University (MFA)
- Occupation: Poet

John Spaulding (born Hanover, New Hampshire) is an American poet.

== Life ==
He graduated from the University of Arizona, Tucson, with an M.A. in English literature and a Ph.D. in psychology. He also has an M.F.A. in creative writing from Boston University.

A native of Vermont, he was mental health director at the Phoenix Area Indian Health Service. and lived in Phoenix, Arizona. for ten years. He was chief of mental health and social services for the Puget Sound Service Unit of the Indian Health Service but also worked with native people in Canada, Oklahoma, Arizona, Utah, and Nevada. In addition to being a psychologist, he has worked as a high school teacher, a proofreader, an editor, and is currently teaching writing at Pima College in Tucson, Arizona.

His work has appeared in The Atlantic Monthly, The Iowa Review, Prairie Schooner, Poetry, American Poetry Review, Boston Review, Hunger Mountain, Rattle, Nimrod and many other periodicals. He is also the editor of Civil War Recipes, a book of culinary history published by the University of Kentucky Press in 1999.

== Awards ==
In 2003 The White Train was a winner in the National Poetry Series.

== Works ==
- "Watching Newsreels"; "Salt Pork"; "Hartford, Vermont"; "Un Soir Après la Guerre", 236
- "Red Glass Necklace", Boston Review, NOVEMBER/DECEMBER 2007
- Walking in Stone. Wesleyan University Press. 1989. ISBN 978-0-8195-1176-8.
- The Roses of Starvation. Riverstone Press. 1987. ISBN 978-0-936600-07-9.
- The White Train. LSU Press. 2004. ISBN 978-0-8071-2998-2.
- Hospital. Finishing Line Press. 2011. ISBN 978-1-59924-837-0.
