= Sabra Loomis =

Irish-American poet (1938–2017)

- Born: 1938
- Died: 2017 (aged 79–80)
- Occupation: Poet
- Awards: National Poetry Series

Academic background
- Education: New York University

Sabra Loomis (1938 – 2017) was an Irish-American poet. Her poetry collection House Held Together by Winds (Harper Perennial, 2008) won the 2007 National Poetry Series. Her honors included Yaddo and MacDowell Colony fellowships.

Her poems appeared in literary journals and magazines including American Poetry Review, American Voice, Cincinnati Poetry Review, Cyphers, Florida Review, Heliotrope, Lumina, Negative Capability, Poetry Ireland Review, Salamander, Salt Hill Journal, and St. Ann's Review.

The daughter of Alfred Loomis of Tuxedo Park, New York, she graduated from New York University, taught at the University of Massachusetts Boston, and was on the faculty of the Poets' House, Donegal. She divided her time between New York City and Achill Island, Ireland.

Loomis died in 2017, at the age of 79–80.

== Honors and awards ==
- 2007 National Poetry Series
- Artists Foundation
- Yeats Society
- British Council
- Yaddo Fellowship
- MacDowell Colony Fellowship
- Virginia Center for the Creative Arts residency

== Published works ==
Full-Length Poetry Collections

- House Held Together by Winds. Harper Perennial. 2008. ISBN 978-0-06-157715-4.
- Rosetree. Alice James Books. 1989. ISBN 978-0-914086-85-7.

Chapbooks

- The Ship (Firm Ground Press, 2001)
- Travelling on Blue. Firm Ground Press. 1998.

Anthology Publications

- Smock, Frederick, ed. (1998). "For Ishi". The American voice anthology of poetry. University Press of Kentucky. p. 67. ISBN 978-0-8131-0956-5. "Sabra Loomis."
- Tobin, Daniel, ed. (2007). The book of Irish American poetry: from the eighteenth century to the present. University of Notre Dame Press. ISBN 978-0-268-04230-1.

== Reviews ==
The house in House Held Together by Winds is both mansion and metaphor. Our docent for each construction is a little girl in a lace collar whose satirical observations of her dominating relatives expose the fears at the root of chauvinism....Readers who allow themselves to be voyeuristically fascinated by the gothic eccentricities of these poems will be moved by the transformation.
