= T. R. Hummer =

American writer

Terry Randolph Hummer
- Born: August 7, 1950 (age 76); Macon, Mississippi, U.S.
- Education: University of Southern Mississippi; University of Utah
- Occupations: Poet, professor
- Awards: Guggenheim Fellowship (1992)

Terry Randolph Hummer (born August 7, 1950) is an American poet and professor. His most recent books of poetry are After the Afterlife (Acre Books) and the three linked volumes Ephemeron, Skandalon, and Eon (Louisiana State University Press). He has published poems in literary journals and magazines including The New Yorker, Harper's, Atlantic Monthly, The Literati Quarterly, Paris Review, and Georgia Review. His honors include a Guggenheim Fellowship inclusion in the 1995 edition of Best American Poetry, the Hanes Prize for Poetry, the Richard Wright Award for Literary Excellence, and three Pushcart Prizes. His Zeitgeist Lightning: New and Selected Poems 1976 to 2026 will be published in March of 2027 by Louisiana State University Press.

== Early life ==
Hummer was born and raised in Mississippi, and graduated from University of Southern Mississippi with a B.A. in 1972 and M.A. in 1974. He graduated from the University of Utah with a PhD, where he studied with Dave Smith and was editor of Quarterly West in 1979.

== Career ==
He taught at Oklahoma State University, where he was poetry editor of The Cimarron Review. In 1984 he relocated to Kenyon College; there, after visiting positions at Middlebury College (where he guest edited New England Review) and the University of California, Irvine, he became editor of The Kenyon Review. In 1989 he returned to Middlebury as editor of New England Review. He relocated to the University of Oregon in 1993, where he directed the MFA Program in Creative Writing. In 1997, he taught at Virginia Commonwealth University. He taught at the University of Georgia, and was editor of The Georgia Review. He retired from Arizona State University.

== Honors and awards ==
- 1992 Guggenheim Fellowship
- National Endowment for the Arts Fellowship
- Pushcart Prize (twice)
- Donald Justice Award for Poetry

== Bibliography ==
=== Poetry ===
Collections

- Hummer, T. R. (1982). The angelic orders : poems. Baton Rouge: Louisiana State University Press.
- — (1984). The passion of the right-angled man. University of Illinois Press.
- Lower-Class Heresy (University of Illinois, 1987)
- The Eighteen-Thousand-Ton Olympic Dream. Morrow. 1990. ISBN 978-0-688-09018-0.
- Walt Whitman in Hell: Poems (Louisiana State University Press, 1996)
- Useless Virtues. Louisiana State University Press. 2001. ISBN 978-0-8071-2669-1.
- The Infinity Sessions: Poems. Southern Messenger Poets. 2005. ISBN 978-0-8071-3066-7.
- Bluegrass Wasteland: Selected Poems 1978-2003. Arc Publications. 2005. ISBN 978-1-900072-82-3.
- Ephemeron: Poems. LSU Press Southern Messenger Poets. 2012. ISBN 978-0-8071-3987-5.
- Skandalon: Poems. LSU Press Southern Messenger Poets. 2014. ISBN 978-0-8071-5741-1.
- Eon: Poems. LSU Press Southern Messenger Poets. 2018.
- After the Afterlife. Acre Books, Cincinnati Review/University of Cincinnati. 2018. ISBN 978-1946724014.
- Zeitgeist Lightning: New and Selected Poems 1976-2026, forthcoming from LSU Press Southern Messenger Poets, 2027.

Chapbooks

- Urn (Diode Editions, 2015)
- Translation of Light (Cedar Creek Press, 1976)

Appearances in anthologies

- Jay Parini, ed. (2005). "Courtly Love". The Wadsworth Anthology of Poetry. Cengage Learning. ISBN 978-1-4130-0473-1.
- Bill Henderson, ed. (2003). Pushcart Prize XXVII: Best of the small presses. Pushcart Press. ISBN 978-1-888889-35-2.
- Leon Stokesbury, ed. (1999). "Inner Ear". The Made Thing: An anthology of contemporary Southern poetry. University of Arkansas Press. p. 138. ISBN 978-1-55728-579-9. "T.R. Hummer."
- Richard Howard; David Lehman, eds. (1995). The Best American Poetry 1995. Simon and Schuster. ISBN 978-0-684-80151-3.
- Bill Henderson, ed. (1993). The Pushcart Prize XVIII: Best of the Small Presses. Pushcart Press. ISBN 978-0-916366-89-6.

List of poems

Title	Year	First published	Reprinted/collected
Glass ceiling	2015	Hummer, T. R. (June 29, 2015). "Glass ceiling". The New Yorker. 91 (18): 33.	
As for the housefly	2016	Hummer, T. R. (October 10, 2016). "As for the housefly". The New Yorker. 92 (32): 81.	

=== Essays ===
- The Muse in the Machine: Essays on Poetry And the Anatomy of the Body Politic (The Life of Poetry: Poets on Their Art and Craft). University of Georgia Press, 2006.
- Mickey Hart; Paul Bresnick, eds. (2004). "The Mechanical Muse". Da Capo Best Music Writing 2004: the year's finest writing on rock, hip-hop, jazz, pop, country, and more. Da Capo Press. p. 129. ISBN 978-0-306-81380-1. "T.R. Hummer mechanical muse."
- Available Surfaces: Essays on Poesis (Poets on Poetry). University of Michigan Press, 2012
