= Camille Norton =

American poet and academic (born 1955)

Camille Norton (born 1955) is an American poet and academic.

== Life ==
She studied with Martha Collins, Linda Dittmar, and Lois Rudnick at the University of Massachusetts Boston; graduated from University of Massachusetts Boston, and Harvard University with a M.A. and Ph.D.

Her work appeared in Greensboro Review, Field: Contemporary Poetry and Poetics, The Colorado Review, Tiferet, Iris, Exphrasis, The White Pelican Review, The Gail Scott Reader, and How2.

She teaches at University of the Pacific.

She will be on the panel for Association of Writers & Writing Programs 2010, "Poets in the World: Building Diverse Communities through Independent Poetry Centers, Blogs, and Radio."

== Awards ==
- 2004 National Poetry Series Award Winner
- Best American Poetry 2010 Selection

== Works ==
- "Estuary", Caffeine Destiny
- Corruption. Harper Perennial. November 29, 2005. ISBN 978-0-06-079913-7.

=== Criticism ===
- Reading the society of outsiders: exile and gender in the modernist novel. Harvard University. 1992.
- Lianne Moyes, ed. (2002). "After Reading Gail Scott's Space Like Stairs". Gail Scott: essays on her works. Guernica Editions. ISBN 978-1-55071-164-6.

=== Editor ===
- Lou Robinson; Camille Norton, eds. (1991). Resurgent: New Writing by Women. University of Illinois Press. ISBN 978-0-252-01835-0.
