= J. Michael Martinez =

American poet

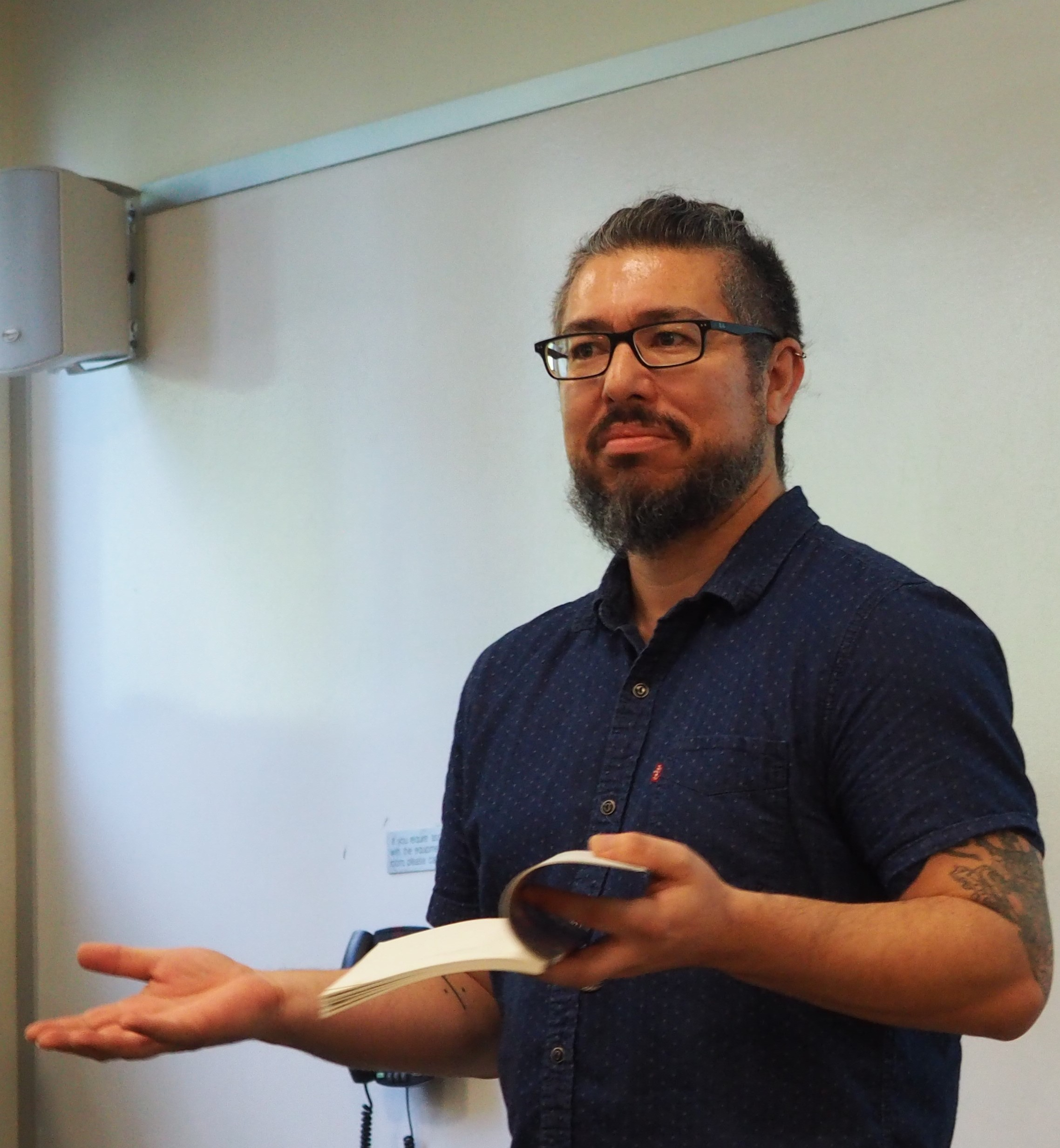
- Education: University of Northern Colorado, George Mason University

J. Michael Martinez is an American poet.

== Life ==
J. Michael Martinez was born and raised in Greeley, Colorado. He is a graduate of the University of Northern Colorado, and George Mason University, with an MFA in creative writing.

His work has appeared in New American Writing, Five Fingers Review, The Colorado Review, and Crab Orchard Review.

He is the recipient of the 2006 Five Fingers Review Poetry Prize and is co-editor and co-founder of Breach Press. Martinez and Gabriel Gomez had a panel at the 2009 AWP conference together.

In 2009, Martinez's poetry collection Heredities was selected by Juan Felipe Herrera for the Academy of American Poets' Walt Whitman Award for first book publication. About his work, Herrera wrote:

Heredities breaks away from four decades of inquiry into cultural identity. Martinez's exhilarating descent into the unspoken—lit by metaphysical investigations, physiological charts, and meta-translations of Hernán Cortés's accounts of his conquests—gives voice to a dismembered continental body buried long ago. This body, though flayed and fractured, rises and sings.

== Awards ==
- 2006 Five Fingers Review Poetry Prize
- 2009 Walt Whitman Award from the Academy of American Poets.
- 2017 National Poetry Series chosen by Cornelius Eady for Penguin Books

== Work ==
=== Poetry ===
- Heredities, LSU Press, 2010, ISBN 978-0807136430
- In the Garden of the Bridehouse, University of Arizona Press, 2014, ISBN 978-0816530892
- Museum of the Americas, Penguin Random House, 2018, ISBN 978-0143133445

=== Anthology ===
- Junta: Avant-Garde Latino/a Writing.
