= Roland Flint =

American writer and academic (1934–2001)

Roland Henry Flint (February 27, 1934 - January 2, 2001) was an American poet and professor of English at Georgetown University.

== Life ==
Born in Park River, North Dakota, he attended the University of North Dakota before joining the United States Marine Corps. He served in post-war Korea and then returned to and graduated from the University of North Dakota. He earned an M.A. in English from Marquette University and a Ph.D. from the University of Minnesota, where he wrote his dissertation on the early work of Theodore Roethke and began to publish his poetry.

He was a professor of English at Georgetown University from 1968 to 1997 and received several university awards for his teaching. During his tenure at Georgetown, Flint received MacDowell (formerly MacDowell Colony) residency awards in 1976, 1983, and 1985. While at MacDowell, he befriended fellow awardee American composer and printer Paul W. Whear, who hand typeset, and letterpress printed "The Honey and Other Poems for Rosalind" for its publication. Whear's work for solo violin and orchestra "A Poem of Roland" was inspired by one of Flint's poems.

Flint is the subject of the eponymous poem "Roland Flint," an excerpt from which was published in The Brooklyn Review in 2016 and which appeared in its entirety in The Revenant Quarterly in 2023.

Flint had a phenomenal memory for poetry and could recite thousands of poems he knew "by heart". He was Poet Laureate of Maryland from 1995 to 2000, when he resigned due to poor health. He died of pancreatic cancer in 2001 at the age of 66. His papers are held at the University of Maryland.

== Selected bibliography ==
=== Poetry ===
- Easy (Louisiana State University, 1999)
- Pigeon (North Carolina Wesleyan, 1991)
- Hearing Voices, with William Stafford, (Willamette University, 1991)
- Stubborn (University of illinois1990)
- Sicily (North Carolina Wesleyan, 1987)
- Resuming Green (The Dial Press, 1982)
- Say It (Dryad Press, 1979)
- The Honey and Other Poems for Rosalind (Unicorn Publications, Limited, 1976)
- And Morning (Dryad Press, 1975)
