= Simeon Berry =

American poet

Simeon Berry (born 1973 in Guilford, Connecticut) is a poet who authored the prize-winning collections Ampersand Revisited and Monograph. His poetry has been published widely in literary journals, including AGNI, Antioch Review, The Literary Review, Washington Square Review, The Iowa Review, New Orleans Review, Southern Poetry Review, Notre Dame Review, Crazyhorse, Passages North, Hayden's Ferry Review, Seneca Review, American Letters & Commentary, Chelsea, The Southeast Review, and Verse.

Berry has won the Academy of American Poets Award and the Career Chapter Award from the National Society of Arts and Letters.
