= Eugene Gloria =

American poet

- Born: 1957 (age 68–69); Manila, Philippines
- Education: San Francisco State University; Miami University; University of Oregon
- Occupation: Poet
- Website: www.eugenegloria.com

Eugene Gloria (born 1957) is a Filipino-born American poet.

== Life ==
Eugene Gloria was born in Manila, Philippines in 1957 and raised in San Francisco, California. He attended St. Agnes School in the Haight-Ashbury and St. Ignatius College Preparatory. He earned a B.A. from San Francisco State University, M.A. from Miami University, and MFA from University of Oregon. He is the John Rabb Emison Professor of Creative and Performing Arts and Professor of English at DePauw University in Greencastle, Indiana where he teaches creative writing and English literature. He served as the Bowling Green State University College of Arts and Sciences Distinguished Visiting Writer for the 2013 spring semester. During the 2017 spring semester, he was a Fulbright Visiting Writer at the University of Santo Tomas Center for Creative Writing and Literary Studies (CCWLS).

He is the author of four books of poems: Sightseer in This Killing City (Penguin Random House, 2019), My Favorite Warlord (Penguin Books, 2012), Hoodlum Birds (Penguin Books, 2006), and Drivers at the Short-Time Motel (Penguin Books, 2000). His individual poems and prose have appeared in The American Poetry Review, TriQuarterly, Shenandoah, The New Republic, Prairie Schooner, Ploughshares, Seneca Review and Harvard Review.

He has been a scholar at the Bread Loaf Writers' Conference and a resident at the MacDowell Colony, Djerassi Artists Residency, Montalvo Arts Center, Willapa Bay Artist-in-Residence (AiR) Program, Fundación Valparaíso in Spain, Le Château de Lavigny in Switzerland, and Virginia Center for the Creative Arts in Virginia and in France.

== Awards ==
- Fulbright Scholar Grant, University of the Philippines
- Poetry Society of America George Bogin Memorial Award
- National Poetry Series selection for Drivers at the Short-Time Motel
- Asian American Literary Award
- Fulbright Lecturer Award, University of Santo Tomas
- 2013 Anisfield-Wolf Book Award
- 2020 Eugene and Marilyn Glick Indiana Authors Award for Poetry

== Work ==
=== Books ===
- —— (2000). Drivers at the Short-Time Motel (paperback 1st ed.). New York: Penguin Books.
- —— (2006). Hoodlum Birds (paperback 1st ed.). New York: Penguin Books.
- —— (2012). My Favorite Warlord (paperback 1st ed.). New York: Penguin Books.
- —— (2019). Sightseer in This Killing City (paperback 1st ed.). New York: Penguin Random House.

=== Anthologies ===
- —— (2004). "Aubade". In Bill Henderson (ed.). The Pushcart Prize XXVIII: Best of the Small Presses. Pushcart Press. ISBN 9781888889376.
- —— (2014). "Liner Notes for Monk". In David Lehman and Terrance Hayes (ed.). The Best American Poetry 2014. Scribner. ISBN 9781476708157.
