= Rick Barot =

American poet and educator

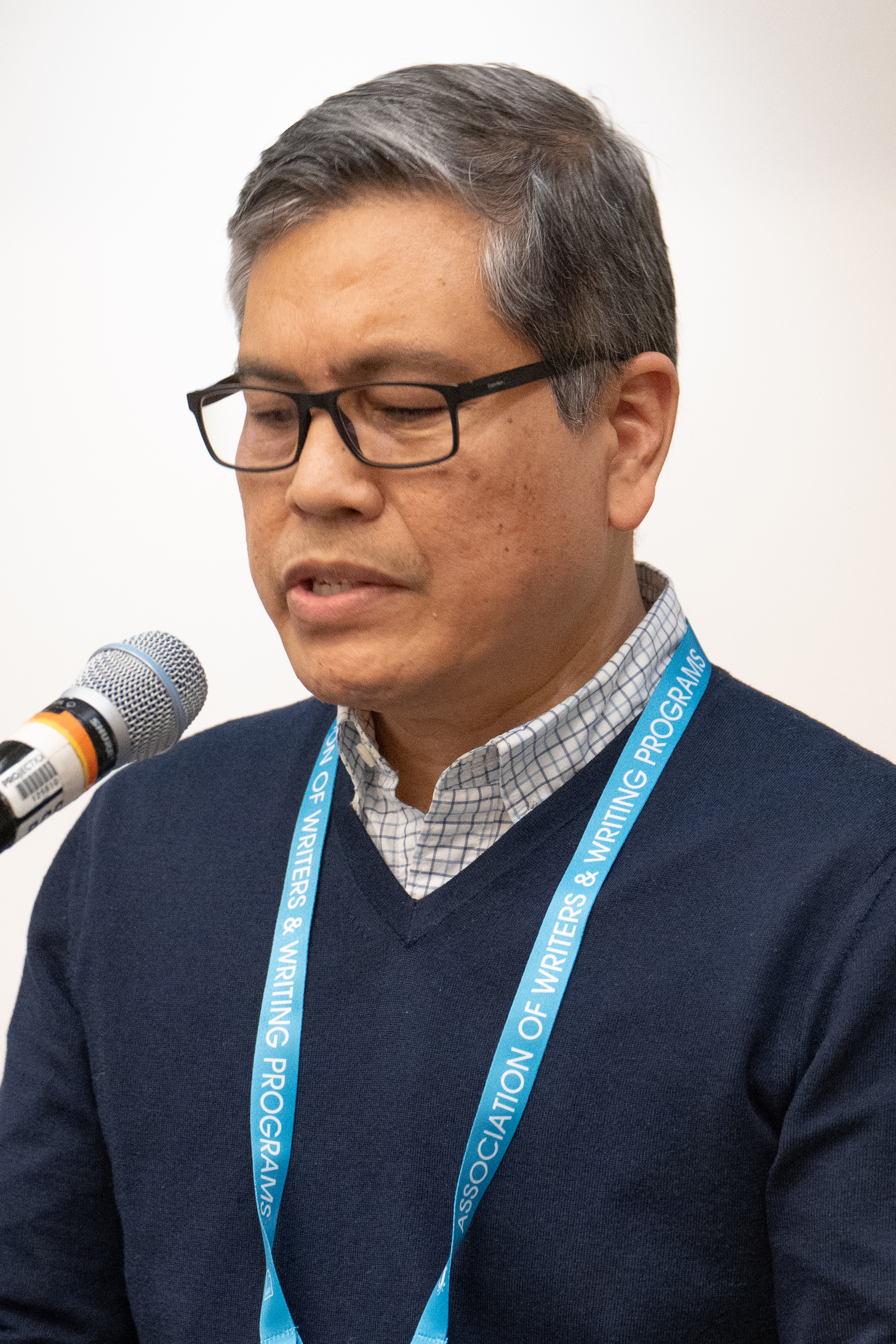
- Barot at AWP 2026
- Born: February 19, 1969 (age 57); Philippines
- Education: Wesleyan University; Iowa Writers' Workshop
- Occupations: Poet, writer, educator
- Website: rickbarot.com

Rick Barot (born February 19, 1969) is an American poet and educator.

== Life ==
Barot was born in the Philippines, grew up in the San Francisco Bay Area, and attended Wesleyan University and the Iowa Writers Workshop.

He has published three books of poetry with Sarabande Books: The Darker Fall (2002), which received the Kathryn A. Morton Prize; Want (2008), which was a finalist for the Lambda Literary Award and won the 2009 Grub Street Book Prize; and Chord (2015), which was a finalist for the LA Times Book Prize and received the 2016 UNT Rilke Prize, the PEN Open Book Award, and the Publishing Triangle's Thom Gunn Award. He has received fellowships from the Guggenheim Foundation, the National Endowment for the Arts, the Artist Trust of Washington, the Civitella Ranieri Foundation, and Stanford University, where he was a Stegner Fellow and a Jones Lecturer in Poetry.

Barot is the poetry editor of New England Review. He lives in Tacoma, Washington, and teaches at Pacific Lutheran University. He is also the director of the Rainier Writing Workshop, the low-residency MFA in creative writing at Pacific Lutheran University. He previously taught at the low-residency MFA at Warren Wilson College. His fourth book of poems, The Galleons, was published by Milkweed Editions in 2020.

== Bibliography ==
=== Poetry ===
Collections

- Barot, Rick (2002). The darker fall. Louisville: Sarabande Books.
- — (2008). Want. Louisville: Sarabande Books.
- — (2015). Chord. Louisville: Sarabande Books.
- — (2020). The galleons. Minneapolis: Milkweed Editions.

List of poems

| Title | Year | First published | Reprinted/collected |
|---|---|---|---|
| Nectarine | 2024 | Barot, Rick (Summer 2024). "Nectarine". 32 Poems. 43: 9. | |
| Here | 2024 | Barot, Rick (Summer 2024). "Here". 32 Poems. 43: 10. | |
