= Dave Smith (poet) =

American poet

Dave Smith (born 19 December 1942 in Portsmouth, Virginia) is an American poet, writer, critic, editor, and educator.

== Biography ==
Dave Smith (David Jeddie Smith) holds BA, MA, and PhD degrees in English from the University of Virginia, Southern Illinois University, and Ohio University, respectively.

Smith served as a staff sergeant in the United States Air Force from 1969 to 1972. Thereafter, he briefly taught English and French and was the football coach at Poquoson High School.

He is the author of more than a dozen volumes of poetry, and has also published works of prose and edited collections. Smith has taught literature and creative writing at numerous institutions of higher education, including the University of Utah, the University of Florida, Virginia Commonwealth University, Louisiana State University, and Johns Hopkins University. Formerly editor of The Southern Review, Smith now serves as editor of the Southern Messenger Poets series from Louisiana State University Press. He is an elected member of the Fellowship of Southern Writers and a frequent Sewanee Writers' Conference faculty member.

== Awards ==
- National Endowment for the Arts Fellowship
- John Simon Guggenheim Foundation Fellowship
- Rockefeller Foundation Fellowship
- Lyndhurst Fellowship
- Virginia Prize in Poetry
- American Academy and Institute of Arts and Letters Award in Poetry

== Bibliography ==
=== Poetry ===
Full-Length Collections

- Mean Rufus Throw Down. Basilisk Press, 1973.
- The Fisherman’s Whore. Ohio University Press, 1974; Carnegie-Mellon University Press, 1989.
- Cumberland Station. University of Illinois Press, 1977.
- Goshawk, Antelope. University of Illinois Press, 1979.
- Blue Spruce. Tamarack Press, 1981.
- Dream Flights. University of Illinois Press, 1981.
- Homage to Edgar Allan Poe. Louisiana State University Press, 1981.
- In the House of the Judge. Harper & Row, 1983; Carnegie-Mellon University Press, 2004.
- Gray Soldiers. Stuart Wright, 1984.
- The Roundhouse Voices: Selected and New Poems. Harper & Row, 1985.
- Cuba Night. William Morrow & Co., 1990.
- Night Pleasures: New and Selected Poems. Bloodaxe Books (England), 1992.
- Fate’s Kite: Poems 1991-1995. Louisiana State University Press, 1995.
- Floating on Solitude: Three Books of Poems. University of Illinois Press, 1997.
- The Wick of Memory: New and Selected Poems 1970-2000. Louisiana State University Press, 2000.
- Little Boats, Unsalvaged. Louisiana State University Press, 2006.
- Hawks on Wires: Poems 2005-2010. Louisiana State University Press, 2011.

Chapbooks

- Bull Island. Back Door Press, 1970.
- Drunks. Sou’wester, 1975.
- In Dark, Sudden With Light. Croissant & Co., Ltd, 1977.
- The Traveling Photographer. Prairie Schooner, 1981.
- Three Poems. Mir Poets/Word Press, England, 1989.
- Tremble. The Black Warrior Review, 1998.

Broadsides

- "Photograph of a Confederate Soldier Standing on Rocks in the James River at Richmond." Stuart Wright, 1982.
- "Brown Shoes." Rattlesnake Mountain Press, Idaho, 1989.

=== Fiction ===
- Onliness. Louisiana State University Press, 1981.
- Southern Delights. Croissant & Co, Ltd., 1984.

=== Essays ===
- Local Assays: On Contemporary American Poetry. University of Illinois Press, 1985.
- Hunting Men: Reflections on a Life in American Poetry. Louisiana State University Press, 2006.

=== Edited Collections ===
- The Pure Clear Word: Essays on the Poetry of James Wright. University of Illinois Press, 1982.
- The Morrow Anthology of Younger American Poets. William Morrow & Co., 1985. Co-edited with David Bottoms.
- The Essential Poe. ECCO Press, 1991.
