= Jack Elliott Myers =

American poet and educator (1941–2009)

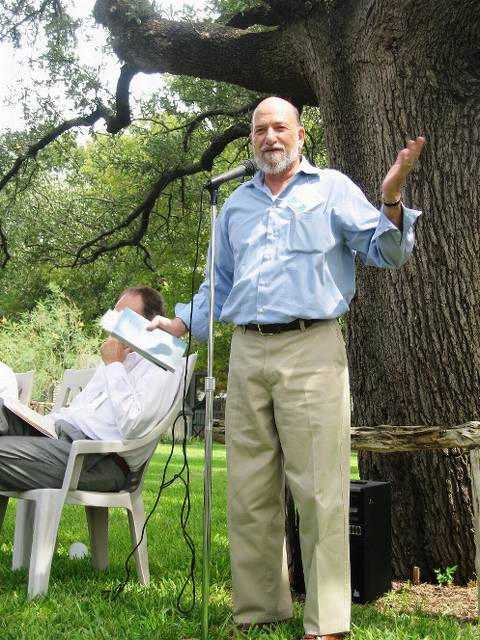
- Jack Myers reading
- Born: November 29, 1941; Lynn, Massachusetts, United States
- Died: November 23, 2009 (aged 67)
- Occupations: Poet; professor; editor; writer
- Writing career
- Notable work: As Long As You're Happy
- Literary movement: New American Poets Modernism

Jack Elliott Myers (November 29, 1941 – November 23, 2009), was an American poet and educator. He was Texas Poet Laureate in 2003, and served on the faculty of Southern Methodist University in Dallas for more than 30 years. He was director of creative writing at SMU from 2001 through 2009. Myers co-founded The Writer's Garret, a nonprofit literary center in Dallas, with his wife, Thea Temple. He published numerous books of and about poetry, and served as a mentor for aspiring writers at SMU and as part of the writers' community and mentoring project of The Writer's Garret.

== Early life ==
Jack Myers was born in Lynn, Massachusetts, to Jewish parents Alvin G. and Ruth L. Myers, and developed an interest in writing and poetry at a young age. In his twenties he worked many odd jobs to support his self-directed study of poetry.

== Early career ==
In 1967, Jack Myers married his first wife, Nancy Leppert, and a year later they had their first son, Benjamin. Myers earned his Bachelor of Arts degree in English literature from the University of Massachusetts Amherst in 1970. After finishing his degree, he moved his family to Iowa City, Iowa where he was accepted into the famed Iowa Writers' Workshop at the University of Iowa. His second son, Seth was born in 1972 while Myers was in Iowa. He became friends with his professor, Dick Hugo, whom he later honored with the Festschrift, A Trout in the Milk: A Composite Portrait of Richard Hugo, in 1980.

== Later career ==
After obtaining his Master of Fine Arts in Poetry Writing, Myers moved his family to Dallas in 1975 when he was hired as an assistant professor of English at Southern Methodist University.

In 1981 Myers became a "Field Faculty" member of Vermont College, and in June of that year married his second wife, Willa Robins. This union produced two children, Jacob and Jessica.

In 1981 he also became the Program Chair of SMU's English Department and served on many committees. During this time he wrote hundreds of poems; edited anthologies; and published The Longman Dictionary of Poetic Terms, a chapbook, and two collections of poetry. One of these, As Long As You're Happy, won the 1985 National Poetry Series (selected by Nobel laureate Seamus Heaney).

In 1993, Myers met his third wife, Thea Temple, at an AWP conference in Norfolk, Virginia. They were married six months later. This union led to a literary partnership and the most productive period of Myers' life, including the founding of the non-profit literary center, The Writer's Garret in Dallas.

== Final years ==
From 1993 until his death, Myers published nine books of and about poetry, taught at six universities, chaired the board of The Writer's Garret, directed the creative writing program at SMU, appeared on radio and television talking about writing and poetry, edited magazines, and founded the Writers' Community and Mentorship Project (CAMP). He also won awards for his writing and teaching.

Myers was named the Poet Laureate of Texas in 2003, and the city of Mesquite honored him with "Jack Myers Day".

== Video ==
- Jack Myers on The Art of Living on YouTube

== Appearances ==
- KERA-radio, Think, w/Kris Boyd, for National Poetry Month, April 2007
- Arts & Letters Live, commissioned poem for multi-media event, April 2007
- The Art of Living, a 26-part national TV series, New Leaf TV, a network devoted to healthy lifestyles
- KERA-radio, Glen Mitchell Show, "What Poetry Means to Dallas", March 9, 2005
- Texas House of Representatives and Senate: Introducing resolution of 2003 Texas Poet Laureate (May/2003)
- ABC's Wide World of Sports, "Fathers and Sons in Golf", June 21, 2003
- Mesquite City Council, Proclamation of "Jack Myers Day", June 2, 2003

== Books ==
- The Memory of Water, New Issues Press, Spring 2011. A volume of poems.
- Routine Heaven, Texas Review Press, 2005. Volume of poems.
- The Poet's Portable Workshop, Wadsworth/Thomson College Textbooks, 2004
- Dictionary of Poetic Terms, North Texas State University, 2003
- The Glowing River: New & Selected Poems, Invisible Cities Press, 2001
- OneOnOne, Autumn House Press, Pittsburgh, 1999. A volume of poems.
- Human Being, Rancho Loco Press, Dallas, 1998, a chapbook of poems.
- Leaning House Poets, Vol. 1, Leaning House Records, Dallas, 1996. A CD/anthology of works by seven nationally known poets, co-edited with Mark Elliott.
- Blindsided, David R. Godine, Inc., Boston, 1993. A volume of poems.
- New American Poets of the 90s, David R. Godine, Inc., Boston, 1991. An anthology of contemporary poetry co-edited with Roger Weingarten (3rd printing)
- A Profile of Twentieth-Century American Poetry, Southern Illinois University Press, Carbondale, 1991. A critical/aesthetic history co-edited with David Wojahn.
- As Long as You're Happy, Graywolf Press, Saint Paul, 1986. Winner of the 1985 National Poetry Series Open Competition (selected by Nobel laureate Seamus Heaney)
- The Longman Dictionary of Poetic Terms, Longman, Inc., New York, 1985. A reference work co-edited with Michael Simms (paperback edition, 1988). Revised edition, 1995.
- New American Poets of the 80s, Wampeter Press, Key West, 1984. An anthology of contemporary poetry co-edited with Roger Weingarten.
- Coming to the Surface, Trilobite Press, Denton, TX, 1984. A chapbook of poems.
- I'm Amazed That You're Still Singing, L'Epervier Press, Seattle, 1981. A full volume of poems.
- A Trout in the Milk: A Composite Portrait of Richard Hugo, Confluence Press, Lewiston, ID, 1980. Festschrift.
- The Family War, L'Epervier Press, Fort Collins, CO, 1977. A volume of poems. (1978 Texas Institute of Letters Award, finalist in Elliston Small Press Book Award)
- Will It Burn, Falcon Publishing, Boston, 1974. Poems with photographs by David Akiba.
- Black Sun Abraxas, Halcyone Press, Boston, 1970. A book of poems.

== Essays and poems in anthologies, textbooks, and recordings ==
- Breathe: 101 Contemporary Odes, Ryan Van Cleave and Chad Prevost, ed., C & R Press, 2008.
- The Weight of Addition: An Anthology of Texas Poetry, Mutabilis Press, Houston, 2008.
- A Student's Texas Treasury of Verse, TCU Press, 2008.
- Joyful Noise: An Anthology of American Spiritual Poetry, ed. Robert Strong, Autumn House Press, 2007.
- Open Book: Essays from the Postgraduate Writers' Conference, Featherstone & Weingarten, eds., Cambridge Scholars Press, UK, 2006
- Under the Rock Umbrella: Contemporary American Poets, 1951–1977, Wm. Walsh, ed., Mercer University Press, 2006.
- The Autumn House Anthology of American Poems and Prayers, ed. Robert Strong, Autumn House Press, 2006.
- Manthology: Poems of the Male Experience, David R. Godine, 2006
- The Giant Book of Poetry, ed. William Roetzheim, Level Four Press, 2006
- 180 More: Extraordinary Poems for Every Day, ed. Billy Collins, Random House, 2005
- Is This Forever or What?: Poems & Paintings from Texas (Greenwillow Press, 2004)
- Stand Up for Poetry: For the Page & the Stage, University of Iowa Press, 2002
- Poets of the New Century, David R. Godine, 2002
- Essential Love, ed., Ginny Lowe, Grayson Books, 2000.
- American Diaspora: Poetry of Exile, Univ. of Iowa Press, 2000
- Clockpunchers: Poetry of America's Workplace, Partisan Press, 2000
- The Body Electric, W.W. Norton, 2000
- Poems and Their Sources, The Literary Review Press, 2000
- Who Are the Rich and Where Do They Live?, Poetry East Special Edition, 2000
- Best of American Poetry Review, W.W. Norton, New York, 2000.
- My Business Is Circumference: Influence & Mastery, Paul Dry Books, Philadelphia, 2000
- What Have You Lost? William Morrow, 2000
- Best Texas Poetry 2, Fire Wheel Editions, 1999
- Best Texas Poetry 1, Fire Wheel Editions, 1998
- Leaning House Poets I, CD/anthology of poetry, Leaning House Records, Dallas, 1996
- Inheritance of Light, anthology, University of North Texas Press, 1996
- Seneca Review 25-Year Retrospective, 1995
- Heartcore: Inspirations for Healthy Sexual Intimacy (HarperCollins, 1996)
- Dog Music: A Poetry Anthology (St. Martin's Press, 1996)
- Articulations: Contemporary Poetry About Medicine (Univ. of Iowa Press, 1995)
- Texas in Poetry: A 150 Year Anthology (Center for Texas Studies, 1994)
- Sports in America (Witness, Wayne State University Press, 1995)
- Stand Up Poetry (California State University Press, Long Beach, 1993)
- The Art and Craft of Poetry (Writers' Digest/North Light Books, 1993)
- The Practice of Poetry (Harper Books, 1992)
- Celebrating Men (forthcoming poetry anthology)
- New American Poets of the 90s (David R. Godine, 1992)
- The Texas Poetry Anthology (Corona Press, 1991)
- The Best of Crazy Horse (University of Arkansas, 1991)
- Anthology of Magazine Verse and Yearbook of American Poetry (Monitor Pub., 1985)
- New American Poets of the 80s (Wampeter Press, 1984)
- Ohio Review Ten-Year Retrospective (Ohio University Press, 1984)
- The Poet's Choice: 100 American Poets (Tendril Press, 1980)
- Anthology of Magazine Verse and Yearbook of American Poetry (Monitor Pub., 1980)
- Voices Within the Ark: Modern Jewish Poets (Avon, 1980)
- Texas Poetry Anthology, 1979
- Texas Stories and Poems, 1977
- Travois, 1976
- The American Poetry Anthology: Poets Under 40 (Avon, 1975)
- Intro #4, 1972
- Anthology of College Poetry, 1964
