= Cold Thief Place =

2025 debut poetry collection by Esther Lin

- Author: Esther Lin
- Publisher: Alice James Books
- Publication date: March 11, 2025
- Pages: 100
- Award: Alice James Award
- ISBN: 978-1949944709

Cold Thief Place is a 2025 debut poetry collection by Esther Lin. Filled with poems about Lin's own experience as an undocumented immigrant in the United States for 21 years, it won the 2023 Alice James Award and was longlisted for the 2025 National Book Award for Poetry.

== Critical reception ==
In a starred review, Publishers Weekly concluded that "These stunning poems breathe new life into the confessional form."

Christopher Kempf, in the Los Angeles Review of Books, lauded Lin's clean, spare style, as well as her ability to sharply observe the undocumented immigrant experience, calling it an "impressive debut" by "a first-book writer already possessed of the graceful touch of the master."

In The Rumpus, Asa Drake wrote that "Esther Lin's Cold Thief Place is a testament to this kind of liberation through art—the ability to find oneself reflected in the canon and to, in turn, offer that visibility to others."
