= A Holy Dread =

2026 poetry collection by R. A. Villanueva

- Author: R. A. Villanueva
- Genre: Poetry
- Publisher: Alice James Books
- Publication date: February 27, 2026
- Pages: 100
- ISBN: 978-1-949944-86-0

A Holy Dread is a 2026 poetry collection by R. A. Villanueva, published by Alice James Books. It won the 2024 Alice James Award.

== Cover ==
In Electric Literature, Villanueva stated he chose a painting by a Filipino artist for the cover, as he wanted the image to correspond to the book's themes: "the sacred and the mortal, the elegy and the praise song, the pressures of language and tradition, grief and gratitude."

== Reception ==
Publishers Weekly gave the book a starred review, describing it as "Intellectually rigorous and emotionally piercing" and "a dynamic book of witness, resistance, and radical hope."

Library Journal lauded Villanueva's tackling of "difficult topics while interweaving...Filipino American upbringing throughout," calling him "a gifted poet" who can "appeal to many readers."

Luisa A. Igloria, in RHINO, wrote that "perhaps one of the more quiet achievements of this book lies in its reframing of that 'holy dread' through history, when history is told from the point of view of a formerly colonized subject."

The Bear Review described it as "a small document—a devotional, maybe, or a book of conjuring—to help give some shape to the mystery."
