= Esther Lin =

Brazil–born poet of Chinese descent

- Born: Rio de Janeiro, Brazil
- Occupation: Poet
- Notable work: Cold Thief Place
- Awards: Alice James Award (2023); Pushcart Prize (2024)

Esther Lin is a Brazil–born poet of Chinese descent. Her debut poetry collection, Cold Thief Place, won the 2023 Alice James Award, was published by Alice James Books in 2025, and was longlisted for the 2025 National Book Award for Poetry.

== Early life ==
Lin was born in Rio de Janeiro, Brazil; her parents had defected from China. She and her family later moved to the United States, where she lived as an undocumented immigrant for 21 years. At age 27, she received her green card and later became an American citizen.

== Career ==
Lin's work has been supported by the Fine Arts Work Center, the T. S. Eliot House, Cité Internationale, the Stegner Fellowship. In addition to her poetry, she serves as a critic-at-large at Poetry Northwest. She also co-runs Undocupoets, an organization founded in 2015 to provide fellowships to other undocumented poets and promote a sense of literary community.

In 2017, Lin released her debut chapbook, The Ghost Wife, which won the Poetry Society of America's Chapbook Fellowship.

In 2024, Lin's poem, "French Sentence," won a Pushcart Prize.

In 2025, Lin released her debut poetry collection, Cold Thief Place, which won the 2023 Alice James Award and the 2026 Norma Farber First Book Award in addition to being longlisted for the National Book Award for Poetry. In The Rumpus, Asa Drake wrote that "Esther Lin's Cold Thief Place is a testament to this kind of liberation through art—the ability to find oneself reflected in the canon and to, in turn, offer that visibility to others." Christopher Kempf, in the Los Angeles Review of Books, lauded Lin's clean, spare style, as well as her ability to sharply observe the undocumented immigrant experience.

== Bibliography ==
=== Poetry collections ===
- Cold Thief Place (Alice James Books, 2025), ISBN 9781949944709
- The Ghost Wife (Poetry Society of America, 2017) (chapbook)
