= Henrietta Goodman =

American poet and author

- Occupations: Poet; author
- Writing career
- Notable awards: Beatrice Hawley Award (2007)

Henrietta Goodman is an American poet, author of three poetry collections, most recently, All That Held Us (BkMk Press, 2018). Her first book, Take What You Want (Alice James Books, 2007), won the Beatrice Hawley Award.

== Honors and awards ==
- 2007 Beatrice Hawley Award, for Take What You Want
- Individual Artist Fellowship from the Montana Arts Council
- Fishtrap Fellowship
- residency at the Kimmel Harding Nelson Center for the Arts
- 2001; 2002 Marjorie Davis Boyden Wilderness Writing Residency

== Published works ==
Full-Length Poetry Collections

- All That Held Us (BkMk Press, 2018)
- Hungry Moon (Mountain West Poetry Series, University Press of Colorado, 2013)
- Take What You Want. Alice James Books. 2007. ISBN 978-1-882295-62-3.

Criticism

- Paying attention: time and form in the work of James Galvin. University of Montana. 1998.
