= Cleveland State University Poetry Center =

Literary small press and poetry outreach organization in Cleveland, Ohio

- Parent company: Cleveland State University
- Founded: 1962
- Founder: Lewis Turco
- Country of origin: United States
- Headquarters location: Cleveland, Ohio
- Distribution: Small Press Distribution
- Publication types: books
- Fiction genres: poetry
- Official website: www.csupoetrycenter.com

The Cleveland State University Poetry Center is a literary small press and poetry outreach organization in Cleveland, Ohio, operated under the auspices of the English Department at Cleveland State University. It publishes original works of poetry by contemporary writers, though it also publishes novellas, essay collections, and occasional works of criticism or translated poetry collections. It was founded in 1962 by poet Lewis Turco at what was then Fenn College, attained its present name two years later when Fenn College was absorbed into the newly founded Cleveland State University, and began publishing books in 1971. From 2007 to 2012 its director and series editor was poet and professor Michael Dumanis. From 2014, its director and Series Editor is the poet and professor Caryl Pagel.

== History ==
In its history, the poetry center has published more than 150 titles, including works by David Baker, Scott Cairns, Jared Carter, Chrystos, Martha Collins, Emily Kendal Frey, David Graham, Richard Hague, Mark Jarman, Claudia Keelan, David Kirby, Thomas Lux, Thylias Moss, Shane McCrae, Amy Newman, Mwatabu S. Okantah, Carol Potter, Claudia Rankine, Tim Seibles, Larry R. Smith, Judith Vollmer, Jeanne Murray Walker, Sam Witt, Russell Atkins, and Franz Wright.

== Poetry center competitions ==
In recent years, the poetry center has acquired the majority of its books through two annual poetry contests, the First Book Competition for new poets and the Open Competition for poets who already have published books. Recent judges for the First Book Competition have included the poets Rae Armantrout, Nick Flynn, Matthea Harvey, and D. A. Powell. From 2008 to 2013, the Open Competition has been juried by a panel consisting of poets Kazim Ali, Mary Biddinger, Michael Dumanis, and Sarah Gridley. In 2015, the Poetry Center will run its first Essay Collection Competition, judged by Wayne Koestenbaum.

== Recent and forthcoming publications ==
Recent and forthcoming publications include books by Samuel Amadon, Oliver Baez Bendorf, John Bradley, Lily Brown, Elyse Fenton, Emily Kendal Frey, Lizzie Harris, Rebecca Hazelton, Rebecca Gayle Howell, Chloe Honum, Dora Malech, Shane McCrae, Helena Mesa, Philip Metres, Zach Savich, Sandra Simonds, S.E. Smith, Mathias Svalina, Allison Titus, Liz Waldner, Michael Joseph Walsh, William Waltz, Allison Benis White, Jon Woodward, Chloe Honum, and Wendy Xu.

The authors it publishes frequently go on to win major literary prizes. Poetry Center author Elyse Fenton won the 2010 University of Wales Dylan Thomas Prize for her collection Clamor. A Whiting Writers' Award was awarded to Poetry Center author Shane McCrae for his collection Mule.

The Cleveland State University Poetry Center was selected by the Huffington Post as one of the 15 independent, small-press publishers that exemplifies "the best qualities of this publishing tradition."

The poetry center also hosts a Visiting Writers/Reading Series for the university community. It is a member of the Community of Literary Magazines and Presses, and its recent titles are distributed by Small Press Distribution.
