= Steve Kistulentz =

American novelist and poet (born 1967)

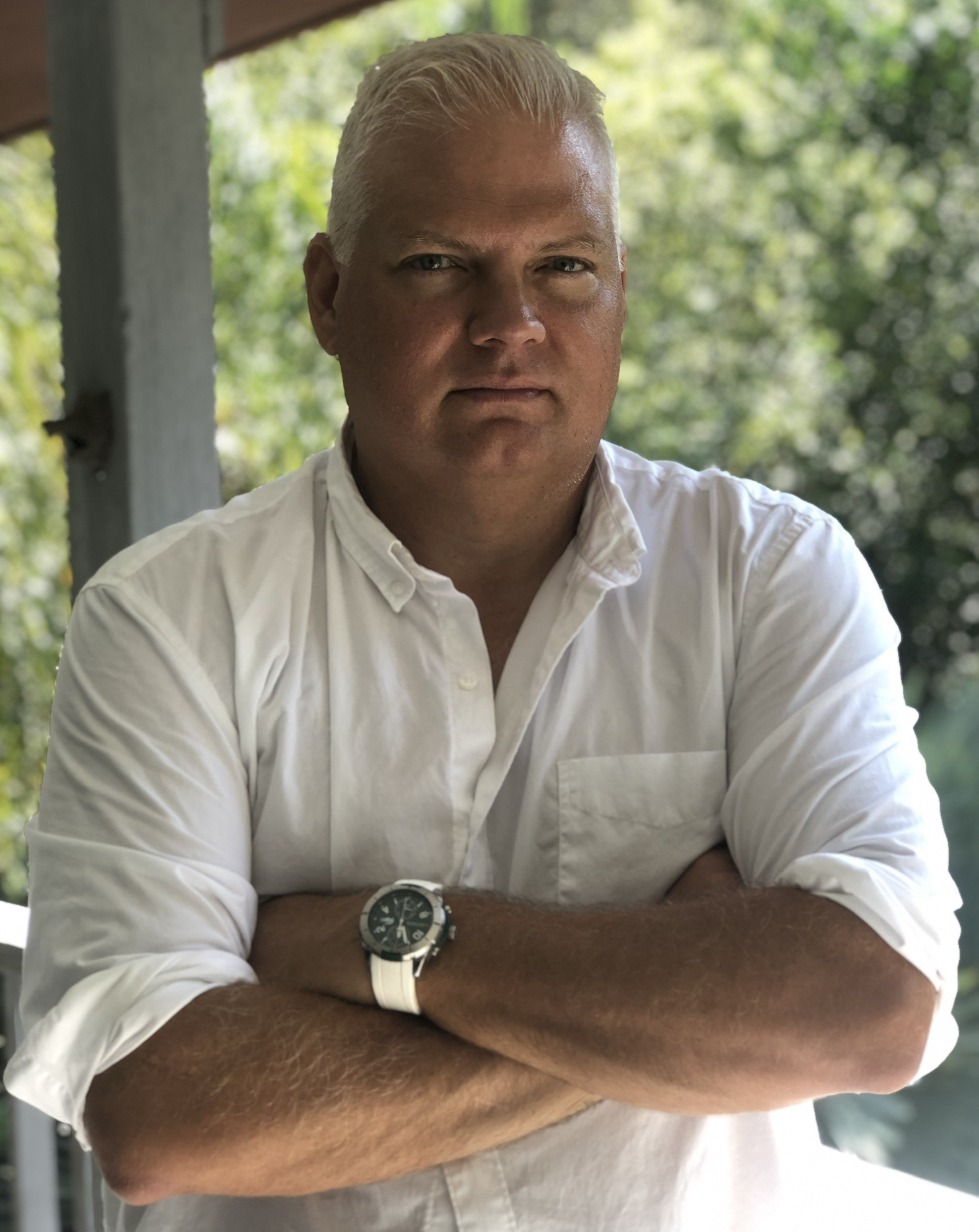
- Kistulentz in 2020
- Born: January 18, 1967 (age 59); Washington, D.C., US
- Education: College of William and Mary (B.A.); Johns Hopkins University (M.A.); Iowa Writer's Workshop (MFA); Florida State University (PhD)
- Occupations: Novelist, poet, screenwriter
- Website: www.kistulentz.com

Steve Kistulentz (born January 18, 1967) is an American novelist, poet, and screenwriter. He is the founding director of the graduate creative writing program at Saint Leo University in Florida. He is a former Poet Laureate of Safety Harbor, Florida.

== Life ==
His novel, Panorama (2018), was named a must-read by publications as diverse as Entertainment Weekly, The New York Daily News, and the Chicago Review of Books. Robert Olen Butler, Pulitzer Prize-winning author of A Good Scent from a Strange Mountain, called Panorama "...A stunning debut by an important new writer." Kirkus Reviews labeled him a "writer to watch."

Kistulentz's first book of poems, The Luckless Age, was selected by Nick Flynn as the winner of the 2010 Benjamin Saltman Award and was published in early 2011 by Red Hen Press. His second book, Little Black Daydream, was an editor's selection in the Akron Series in Poetry and was published by the University of Akron Press in 2013.

His poetry has appeared in such literary magazines as The Antioch Review, Black Warrior Review, Crab Orchard Review, and New England Review, New Letters, Quarterly West, The Southern Review, and many others.

Individual poems have also won recognition from such noted poets as former Poet Laureate of the United States Mark Strand, who selected “The David Lee Roth Fuck Poem…” for the 2008 edition of the Best New Poets anthology, and by the Academy of American Poets, which included the John Mackay Shaw award-winning poem “Bargain” in the ninth volume of its Helen Burns Anthology, edited by Mark Doty. His poem "The Rosenstiel Cycle" won the 1999 Writers at Work Fellowship in Poetry. His work appeared in Barrelhouse Review.

His essay, "Home from the War: An Appreciation of Magnum PI," appeared in the debut issue of the independent literary magazine Barrelhouse, and was nominated for a Pushcart Prize. The essay was later anthologized in the sold-out collection, Bring the Noise: The Best Pop Culture Essays From Barrelhouse.

He has taught previously at the University of Tampa, where he directed the MFA program, and at Millsaps College. He received his doctorate from the Florida State University, where he was the Edward and Marie C. Kingsbury Fellow, an award given to the outstanding graduate students in the College of Arts and Sciences; he also holds an M.F.A. from the Iowa Writers' Workshop, where he taught creative writing as the Joseph and Ursil Callan Scholar, and was a classmate of such notable writers as Yiyun Li, Nam Le, and Daniel Alarcón.

He was awarded an M.A. from Johns Hopkins University, and a B.A. from the College of William and Mary in Virginia.

In 2021, Kistulentz published The Mating Calls of the Dead, a collection of poems about grief and family. Poet Shane McCrae called the poems in this book "among the best recent poems of the American South."

In 2022, Kistulentz was arrested for and confessed to ten counts of intentional viewing of child pornography.

== Works ==
- The Mating Calls of the Dead, Black Lawrence Press, 2021. ISBN 978-1-62557-020-8
- Panorama, Little, Brown and Company, 2018. ISBN 978-0316551762
- The Luckless Age: Poems, Red Hen Press, 2011, ISBN 9781597094948
- Little Black Daydream, University of Akron Press, 2013, ISBN 9781937378202
- Ava Gardner: Touches of Venus, Entasis Press, 2010. ISBN 978-0980099959
- The Helen Burns Poetry Anthology: New Voices from the Academy of American Poets Vol 9., Academy of American Poets, 2010. ISBN 978-0615319407
- Bring the Noise: The Best Pop Culture Essays from Barrelhouse, 2013. ISBN 978-0988994508
