= Carol Potter =

Carol Potter may refer to:

- Carol Potter (poet), American poet and professor
- Carol Potter (actress) (born 1948), American actress
