= Alice James Award =

Annual poetry prize

The Alice James Award, formerly the Beatrice Hawley Award, is given annually by Alice James Books. The award includes publication of a book-length poetry manuscript and a cash prize (currently $2,000).

The award was established by the press in 1986 to honor cooperative member author Beatrice Hawley (Making the House Fall Down, 1977) who died in 1985 at forty-one years of age from lung cancer. The Award was renamed, like its sponsoring publisher, after Alice James "whose extraordinary gift for writing went unrecognized in her lifetime." The Award is a nationally-offered publication prize open to poets at any stage of their careers.

The first award recipient was Linnea Johnson, for The Chicago Home. Winners of the award have often gone on to receive national attention and further honors for their winning works, most notably, Brian Turner for Here, Bullet, which received national and international media attention. Turner also received numerous further awards and honors for his work, including a 2006 Lannan Literary Fellowship, the 2006 Northern California Book Award in Poetry, the 2006 PEN Center USA "Best in the West" Literary Award in Poetry, a 2007 NEA Literature Fellowship in Poetry, the 2007 Poets' Prize, and the 2009 Amy Lowell Poetry Traveling Scholarship.

Catherine Barnett (Into Perfect Spheres Such Holes Are Pierced, 2003) was further recognized with the 2004 Glasgow Prize for Emerging Writers, a Whiting Award, and a Guggenheim Fellowship. Mary Szybist (Granted, 2003) was further recognized with the 2004 Great Lakes Colleges Association New Writers Award, and was a 2003 National Book Critics Circle Award Finalist. B.H. Fairchild (The Art of the Lathe, 1997) was 1998 National Book Award Finalist, and won the 1999 William Carlos Williams Award, the 1999 PEN Center West Poetry Award, the 1999 Kingsley Tufts Poetry Award, and the 1999 California Book Award.

The 2008 winner, Slamming Open the Door, by Kathleen Sheeder Bonanno, was reviewed by The New York Times Sunday Book Review, and Bonanno was interviewed on NPR's Fresh Air by Terri Gross.

== Beatrice Hawley / Alice James Award Winners ==
- 1986: Linnea Johnson, for The Chicago Home
- 1987: Laurel Trivelpiece, for Blue Holes
- 1988: Jean Valentine, for Home Deep Blue
- 1992: Alice Jones, for The Knot
- 1994: Richard McCann, for Ghost Letters
- 1995: Forrest Hamer, for Call & Response
- 1996: Cynthia Huntington, for We Have Gone to the Beach
- 1997: B.H. Fairchild, for The Art of the Lathe
- 1998: Laura Kasischke, for Fire and Flower
- 1999: Amy Newman, for Camera Lyrica
- 2000: Claudia Keelan, for Utopic
- 2001: Liz Waldner, for Self and Simulacra
- 2002: Mary Szybist, for Granted
- 2003: Catherine Barnett, for Into Perfect Spheres Such Holes Are Pierced
- 2004: Dobby Gibson, for Polar
- 2005: Brian Turner, for Here, Bullet
- 2006: Henrietta Goodman, for Take What You Want
- 2007: Lia Purpura, for King Baby
- 2008: Kathleen Sheeder Bonanno for Slamming Open the Door
- 2009: Reginald Dwayne Betts, for Shahid Reads His Own Palm
- 2010: Lesle Lewis, for lie down too
- 2011: Jane Springer, for Murder Ballad
- 2012: Jamaal May for Hum
- 2013: Philip Metres for Sand Opera
- 2014: Richie Hofmann for Second Empire
- 2015: Elizabeth Lyons for The Blessing of Dark Water
- 2016: Anna Rose Welch for Noah's Woods
- 2017: Mia Malhotra for When I See You Again It Will Be With a Different Face
- 2018: Amy Woolard for Neck of the Woods
- 2019: Rosebud Ben-Oni for If This is the Age We End Discovery
- 2020: Aldo Amparán for Brother Sleep
- 2021: Ina Cariño for Feast
- 2022: Willie Lee Kinard III for Orders of Service
- 2023: Esther Lin for Cold Thief Place
- 2024: R. A. Villanueva for A Holy Dread
- 2025: Malvika Jolly for Visiting Hours of the World

== Sources ==
- alicejamesbooks.org, official website of Alice James Books
