= Catherine Barnett =

American writer

- Education: Princeton University (B.A.); Warren Wilson College (M.F.A.)
- Occupations: Poet; educator
- Website: https://www.catherinebarnett.com/

Catherine Barnett is an American poet and educator. She is the author of Solutions for the Problem of Bodies in Space (Graywolf Press, 2024); Human Hours (Graywolf Press, 2018), winner of the Believer Book Award; The Game of Boxes (Graywolf Press, 2012), winner of the James Laughlin Award; and Into Perfect Spheres Such Holes Are Pierced (Alice James Books, 2004), winner of the Beatrice Hawley Award. Her honors include an Award in Literature from the American Academy of Arts and Letters, a Whiting Award, a Guggenheim Fellowship, and a fellowship from the Civitella Ranieri Foundation. She has published widely in journals and magazines including The American Poetry Review, Barrow Street, The Iowa Review, The Kenyon Review, The Massachusetts Review, The New York Review of Books, The New Yorker, Harper's, The Nation, Pleiades, Poetry, the Virginia Quarterly Review, and The Washington Post. Her poetry was featured in The Best American Poetry 2016, edited by Edward Hirsch. Barnett teaches in the graduate and undergraduate writing programs at New York University. She has also taught in the MFA Program at Hunter College, Princeton University, The New School, and Barnard College. She also works as an independent editor. She received her B.A. from Princeton University and an M.F.A. from the Warren Wilson College MFA Program for Writers.

== Honors and awards ==
- 2022 Award in Literature from the American Academy of Arts and Letters
- 2021 Golden Dozen Teaching Award, NYU
- 2019 Finalist, Four Quartets Prize
- 2018 Believer Book Award
- 2012 James Laughlin Award
- 2006 Guggenheim Fellowship
- 2004 Whiting Award
- 2004 Glasgow Prize for Emerging Writers
- 2003 Beatrice Hawley Award

== Published works ==
- Into Perfect Spheres Such Holes are Pierced (Alice James Books, 2004)
- The Game of Boxes (Graywolf Press, 2012)
- Human Hours (Graywolf Press, 2018)
- Solutions for the Problem of Bodies in Space (Graywolf Press, 2024)

== Sources ==
- New York University > Creative Writing Program > Faculty
- The New School > Riggio Honors Program: Writing and Democracy > Faculty
