= Linnea Johnson =

American poet (born 1946)

- Born: September 22, 1946; Chicago, Illinois, U.S.
- Died: April 20, 2013 (aged 66); Topeka, Kansas, U.S.
- Education: University of Nebraska–Lincoln (BA, PhD); Goddard College (MA)
- Writing career
- Genre: Poetry
- Website: linneajohnsonauthor.com

Linnea Johnson (September 22, 1946 – April 20, 2013) was an American poet, and feminist writer, winner of the inaugural Beatrice Hawley Award for The Chicago Home (Alice James Books, 1986). Johnson was raised in Chicago, and lived for much of her life in Topeka, Kansas.

She earned a B.A. and a Ph.D. from the University of Nebraska, and an M.A. in writing and women's studies from Goddard College. She has hosted radio shows on WGLT-FM (Normal, Illinois) and on KRNU (Lincoln, NE). Among her performance pieces are Swedish Christmas and a multi-media piece, Crazy Song. She studied papermaking at Carriage House Paper in Boston, and is founder and director of Red Stuga Studio and Espelunda 3 Productions, a Writing, Creativity, and Mentoring Consultancy also offering classes in creativity, poetry, prose, and play writing; Play, CD, and Staged Reading Productions. Her photographs can be found in Blatant Image, Nebraska Review, Prairie Schooner, Spoon River Poetry Journal.

Her poems have been published in literary journals and magazines including The American Poetry Review, Beloit Poetry Review, Cimarron Review, Ekphrasis, Luna, North American Review, Prairie Schooner, Red Hawk Review, Spoon River Poetry Review, The Antioch Review, Black, Warrior Review, Mother Earth News, and Rain and Thunder.

Adrienne Rich has praised her poems as, "strong and ardent and credible, full of wisdom and indignation. They tell stories we need to hear, sung with the pounding verve of the blood behind them."

== Published works ==
Full-length Poetry Collections

- Augury. Backwaters Press. 2009. ISBN 978-1-935218-12-8.
- The Chicago Home. Alice James Books. 1986. ISBN 978-0-914086-63-5.

Anthology Publications

- Maureen T. Reddy; Martha Roth; Amy Sheldon, eds. (1994). Mother journeys: feminists write about mothering. Spinsters Ink. ISBN 978-1-883523-04-6.
