= Betsy Sholl =

American poet

- Born: 1945 (age 80–81)
- Education: Bucknell University; University of Rochester; Vermont College of Fine Arts
- Writing career
- Genre: Poetry
- Notable works: The Red Line; Don't Explain; Otherwise Unseeable
- Notable awards: AWP Award for Poetry; Poet Laureate of Maine
- Website: betsysholl.com

Elizabeth "Betsy" Sholl (born 1945) is an American poet who was poet laureate of Maine from 2006 to 2011 and has authored nine collections of poetry. Sholl has received several poetry awards, including the 1991 AWP Award, and the 2015 Maine Literary Award, as well as receiving fellowships from the National Endowment for the Arts and the Maine Arts Commission.

Sholl's poetry has been published in anthologies and in literary journals including Orion Magazine, Field, TriQuarterly, The Kenyon Review, The Massachusetts Review, and Ploughshares.

== Career ==
Sholl was one the founding members of Alice James Books, a non-profit publishing house at the University of Maine at Farmington, established in 1973 with the intent of widening women's access to publishing. Sholl published her first three poetry collections with Alice James Books: Changing Faces (1974), Appalachian Winter (1978) and Rooms Overhead (1986).

In 1991, Sholl's chapbook Pick a Card won the Maine Chapbook Competition, which was judged by Donald Hall. That same year, her poetry collection The Red Line won the Association of Writers & Writing Programs award for poetry. The National Endowment for the Arts gave Sholl an artist fellowship in 1994.

In 1997, Sholl's collection Don't Explain was selected by Rita Dove to receive the Felix Pollak Prize in Poetry. Dove, a previous holder of the position of US Poet Laureate, described Sholl's poems as "what narrative can aspire to – namely, the grace and ease of the lyric rhapsody".

Sholl served as Maine's third poet laureate from 2006 to 2011. This is an honorary five-year position, with the laureate chosen in a process overseen by the Maine Arts Commission and appointed by the Governor of Maine, then John Baldacci.

Sholl's collection Otherwise Unseeable won two prizes, the 2014 Four Lakes Prize in Poetry, and the 2015 Maine Literary Award for Poetry.

Sholl taught at the University of Southern Maine for over two decades. She teaches in the Master of Fine Arts program at the Vermont College of Fine Arts, and she has been a visiting poet at the University of Pittsburgh and at Bucknell University, and has twice received an Individual Artist Fellowship Award from the Maine Arts Commission.

Regarding poetry, Sholl has said that its main purpose "is to refresh or renew the language" and that "it renews the presence and aliveness of language".

== Personal life and education ==
Born in Lakewood Township, New Jersey, Sholl grew up in Bricktown, New Jersey. In 1967, she gained a BA in English Literature from Bucknell University, in 1969 an MA from the University of Rochester, and in 1989 a MFA in writing from Vermont College. She moved to Maine in 1983 after stints in Boston and Big Stone Gap, Virginia, and now lives in Portland, Maine with her husband Doug.

== Published works ==
=== Full-length poetry collections ===
- Changing Faces. Cambridge, Massachusetts: Alice James Books. 1974. ISBN 9780914086055. OCLC 1217580.
- Appalachian winter. Cambridge, Massachusetts: Alice James Poetry Cooperative. 1978. ISBN 9780914086215. OCLC 464637445.
- Rooms Overhead. Cambridge, Massachusetts: Alice James Books. 1986. ISBN 9780914086673. OCLC 15001945.
- The Red Line. Pittsburgh, Pennsylvania: University of Pittsburgh Press. 1992. ISBN 9780822954828.
- Don't Explain. Madison, Wisconsin: University of Wisconsin Press. 1997. ISBN 9780299157203. OCLC 36676000.
- Late Psalm. Madison, Wisconsin: University of Wisconsin Press. 2004. ISBN 9780299198930. OCLC 929635289.
- Rough Cradle. Farmington, Maine: Alice James Books. 2009. ISBN 9781882295739. OCLC 261175896.
- Otherwise Unseeable. Madison, Wisconsin: University of Wisconsin Press. 2014. ISBN 9780299299330. OCLC 930854601.
- House of Sparrows : New and selected poems. Madison, Wisconsin: University of Wisconsin Press. 2019. ISBN 9780299323042. OCLC 1053147930.

=== Chapbooks ===
- Pick a Card. A Coyote/Bark Publication of the Maine Arts Commission. 1991. ISBN 9780913341148. OCLC 25568426.
- Coastal Bop. Durham, New Hampshire: Oyster River Press. 2001. ISBN 9781882291809. OCLC 57252210.
- Greatest Hits, 1974-2004. Columbus, Ohio: Pudding House Publications. 2006. ISBN 9781589983762. OCLC 71791296.

=== Contributions in anthologies ===
- Daniels, Jim, ed. (1995). "Betsy Sholl". Letters to America : contemporary American poetry on race. Detroit, Michigan: Wayne State University Press. pp. 162–166. ISBN 9780814325421. OCLC 779970337.
- Gemin, Pamela; Sergi, Paula, eds. (1999). "Betsy Sholl, 'Sex Ed'". Boomer Girls : poems by women from the baby boom generation. Iowa City: University of Iowa Press. p. 169. ISBN 9780877456988. OCLC 632556743.
- McNair, Wesley, ed. (2006). The Maine Poets : An Anthology of Verse. Camden, Maine: Down East Books. ISBN 9780892727087. OCLC 53884604.
- Wagoner, David; Lehman, David, eds. (2009). "Betsy Sholl, 'Gravity and Grace'". The Best American Poetry, 2009. Simon and Schuster. pp. 113-114. ISBN 9780743299763.
- An Endless Skyway : poetry from the State Poets Laureate. North Liberty, Iowa: Ice Cube Books. 2011. ISBN 9781888160529. OCLC 707245290.
- Zaleski, Philip, ed. (2011). "Betsy Sholl, 'Pears, Un stolen'". The Best Spiritual Writing 2012. Penguin Books. ISBN 9781101552650.
- Macari, Anne Marie; Salerno, Carey, eds. (2013). Lit from Inside : 40 years of poetry from Alice James Books. Alice James Books. ISBN 9781882295968.

=== Contributions in literary journals ===
- "We Keep Her in a Box". Ploughshares. No. 11. 1977.
- "The Red Line". Ploughshares. No. 51. 1990.
- "Three Wishes". Ploughshares. No. 51. 1990.
- "The Coat". The Massachusetts Review. Vol. 32, no. 2. 1991.
- "Half the Music". The Massachusetts Review. Vol. 40, no. 2. 1999.
- "Late Psalm". The Kenyon Review. Vol. XXIV, no. 1. 2002.
- "Transport". TriQuarterly. No. 119. 2004. Archived from the original on 2023-12-16.
- "Endless Argument". Orion Magazine.
- "Philomela". Field. No. 97. 2017.
- "Shrines". Ploughshares. No. 113. 2010.
- "Blue Village". The Massachusetts Review. Vol. 53, no. 1. 2012.
- "Orion". Beloit Poetry Journal. 64 (1): 12. 2013.
