= Lesle Lewis (author) =

American poet and professor

Lesle Lewis is an American poet and professor. She is the author of seven poetry collections, most recently John's Table and Survival of the Fittest Pronoun (both released in 2026). Her fourth collection A Boot's a Boot was the winner of the 2013 Cleveland State University Poetry Center Open Book Competition. In reviewing her earlier collection, lie down too, winner of the 2010 Beatrice Hawley Award, (Alice James Books, 2011). Publishers Weekly, wrote "Few poets handle both syntax and sound as she does, and few flirt so well both with, and against, common sense, with and against ordinary adult experience." Her first collection, Small Boat (University of Iowa Press, 2003), won the 2002 Iowa Poetry Prize. Her poems have been published in many literary journals and magazines including American Letters and Commentary, Green Mountains Review, Barrow Street, Pool, The Hollins Critic, The Massachusetts Review, and Jubilat, and featured on the Academy of American Poets website.

Lewis earned a B.S. in education at the New York University, an M.A.L.S. in English at Keene State College, and an M.F.A. in poetry from the University of Massachusetts Amherst. She recently retired from teaching at Landmark College in Putney, Vermont, and currently lives in Alstead, New Hampshire.

== Published works ==
- Survival of the Fittest Pronoun. Quale Press, 2026
- John's Table. Piżama Press, 2026
- Hydrogen. Factory Hollow Press, 2025
- Rainy Days on the Farm. Fence Books, 2019
- A Boot's a Boot. Cleveland State University Poetry Center, 2014
- It's Rothko in Winter or Belgium. Factory Hollow Press, 2012
- lie down too. Alice James Books, 2011
- Landscapes I & II. Alice James Books, 2006
- Small Boat. University of Iowa Press, 2003
