= Dobby Gibson =

American poet (born 1970)

Dobby Gibson (born 1970) is an American poet. His first book of poetry, Polar, (2004) won the 2004 Alice James Award and was a finalist for the 2006 Minnesota Book Award. He is also author of Skirmish (2009), It Becomes You (2013), Little Glass Planet (2019), and Hold Everything (2024), all published by Graywolf Press. His book It Becomes You was a finalist for the 2013 Believer Poetry Award. The title poem of his collection Hold Everything won the 2025 Four Quartets Prize from the Poetry Society of America and the T.S. Eliot Foundation.

Gibson's poetry has appeared in The New Yorker, The Paris Review, Ploughshares, Fence, Iowa Review, New England Review, American Poetry Review, Conduit, among other publications. He is the recipient of poetry fellowships from the Lannan Foundation and the McKnight Foundation. Born in Minneapolis, Minnesota, he earned a B.A. from Connecticut College in 1993 and an M.F.A. from Indiana University Bloomington in 1997. He lives in St. Paul, Minnesota.

== Published works ==
- Gibson, Dobby (2005). Polar. Alice James Books. ISBN 978-1-882295-49-4.
- Gibson, Dobby (2009). Skirmish. Graywolf Press. ISBN 978-1-55597-515-9.
- Gibson, Dobby (2013). It Becomes You. Graywolf Press. ISBN 978-1-55597-632-3.
- Gibson, Dobby (2019). Little Glass Planet. Graywolf Press. ISBN 978-1-55597-842-6.
- Gibson, Dobby (2024). Hold Everything. Graywolf Press. ISBN 978-1-64445-309-4.
