= Cynthia Huntington =

American poet

Cynthia Huntington is an American poet, memoirist and a professor of English and Creative Writing at Dartmouth College. In 2004 she was named Poet Laureate of New Hampshire.

== Life and career ==
Huntington has published numerous books of poetry, including Heavenly Bodies (Southern Illinois University Press, 2012), a finalist for the National Book Award. She has published poems in numerous literary journals and magazines including TriQuarterly, The Michigan Quarterly Review, Harvard Review, Cimarron Review, AGNI, Ploughshares, and Massachusetts Review, and in anthologies including The Best American Erotic Poems: From 1800 to the Present (Sribner, 2008) and Contemporary Poetry of New England (Middlebury College Press, 2002).

She was born in Meadville, Pennsylvania, and received her M.A. from The Bread Loaf School of English at Middlebury College. She is Professor of English and Creative Writing at Dartmouth College.

== Awards and honors ==
- 2004 Poet Laureate of New Hampshire.
- 2012 National Book Award (Poetry), finalist, Heavenly Bodies

Huntington has received grants from the New Hampshire State Council on the Arts, The Fine Arts Work Center in Provincetown, and the Massachusetts Cultural Council, as well as two fellowships from the National Endowment for the Arts. Other awards include: the Robert Frost Prize from The Frost Place in Franconia, New Hampshire, the Jane Kenyon Award in Poetry, and the Emily Clark Balch Prize.

== Works ==
Poetry

- Terra Nova (Southern Illinois University Press, 2017)
- Fire Muse: Poems from the Salt House (Dartmouth College Press, 2016)
- Heavenly Bodies (Southern Illinois University Press, 2012)
- The Radiant (Four Way Books, 2003, winner of the Levis Poetry Prize)
- We Have Gone to the Beach (Alice James Books, 1996, winner of the Beatrice Hawley Award)
- The Fish-Wife (University of Hawaii Press, 1986, Pacific Poetry Series Comp Winner)

Prose

- The Salt House: A Summer on the Dunes of Cape Cod (University Press of New England, 1999)
