= Ina Cariño =

American poet

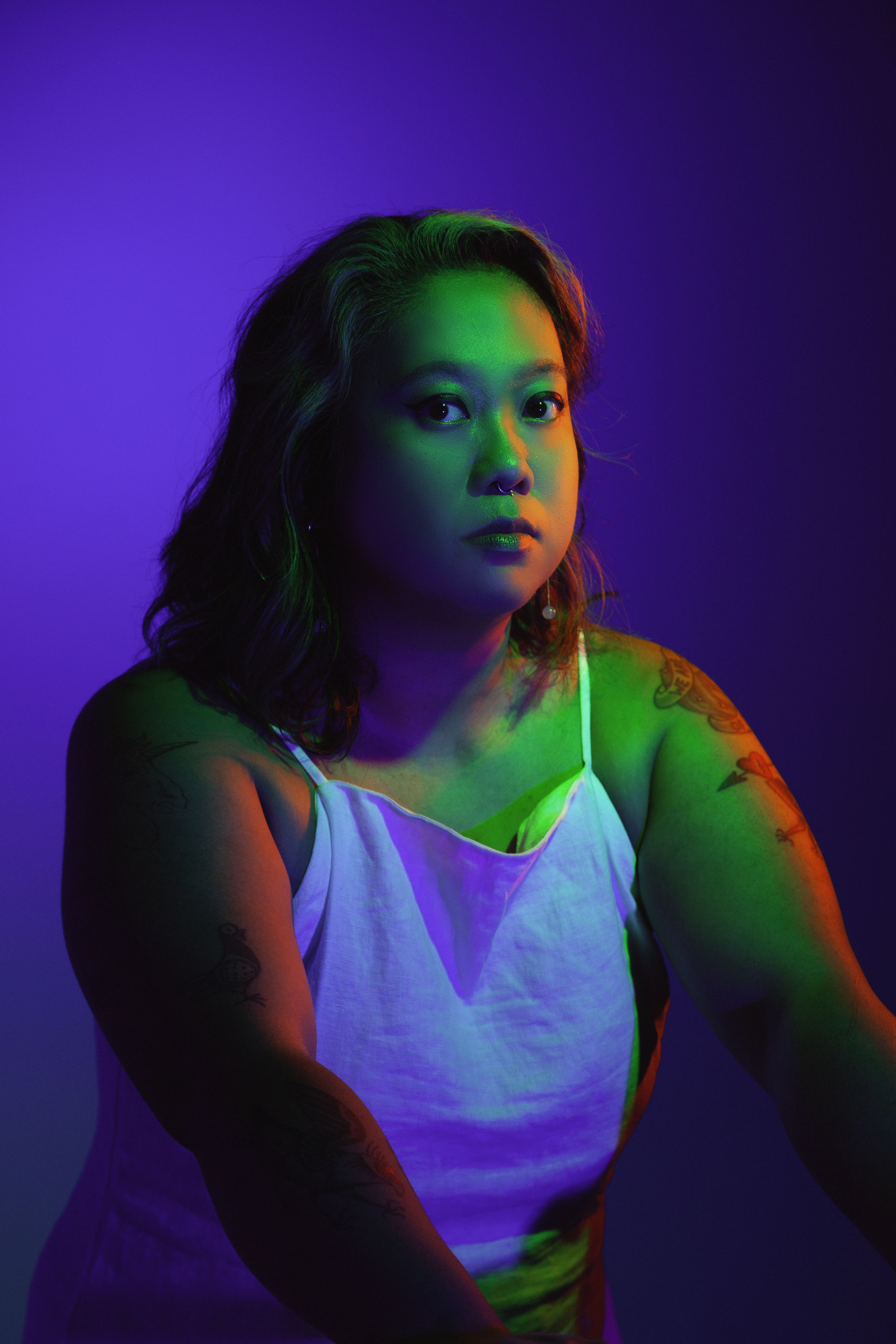

Ina Cariño is a Filipinx American poet. They are the winner of a 2022 Whiting Award for poetry, and the winner of the 2021 Alice James Award for their first poetry collection Feast, published by Alice James Books in March 2023.

== Biography ==
Cariño has an MFA in creative writing from North Carolina State University. They also have a BA in English literature with a minor in music performance on the violin from East Carolina University.

A Kundiman fellow, their work has appeared in literary journals such as Guernica, Poetry Magazine, The Paris Review Daily, and elsewhere.

In 2019, Cariño founded a poetry reading series called Indigena Collective, a platform that aims to center marginalized creatives in the NC community and beyond.

== Publications ==
- Feast (Alice James Books, March 2023)
- Reverse Requiem (Alice James Books, April 2026)

== Awards and honors ==
- 2026 Roanoke Chowan Award for poetry
- 2025 Lucille Medwick Memorial Award
- 2022 George Bogin Memorial Award
- 2022 Whiting Award for poetry
- 2021 Alice James Award
- 2021 92Y Discovery Contest winner
