= Pedrick =

Pedrick is a surname of British origin. People with that name include:

- Arthur Paul Pedrick (1918–1976), British patent examiner and inventor
- Gale Pedrick (1906–1970), English author, journalist, scriptwriter and broadcaster
- Jean Pedrick (1922–2006), American author, poet, editor and publisher
- Robert John (born Robert John Pedrick Jr., 1946), American singer-songwriter

== See also ==
- Marcellus Pedrick House AKA Pedrick-Lawson House, located in Ripon, Wisconsin
- USS Stag (AW-1), originally laid down as SS Norman O. Pedrick
