= Theophanies (book) =

Poetry collection by Sarah Ghazal Ali

- Cover of Theophanies
- Author: Sarah Ghazal Ali
- Language: English
- Genre: Poetry
- Publisher: Alice James Books
- Publication date: 2024
- Publication place: United States
- ISBN: 9781949944587

Theophanies is a poetry collection by poet Sarah Ghazal Ali. It was published by Alice James Books in 2024. A UK edition was published by the87press in 2025.

In 2025, Theophanies won the GLCA New Writers Award for Poetry and the California Book Award Gold Medal for Poetry. It was shortlisted for the Forward Prize for Best First Collection and was a finalist for the Kate Tufts Discovery Award.

Theophanies has been reviewed in publications including the Los Angeles Review of Books, Publishers Weekly, and Harvard Review.
