= Kathleen Sheeder Bonanno =

American poet

Kathleen Sheeder Bonanno (1956-2017) was an American poet, teacher, and contributing editor to The American Poetry Review.. Bonanno received a Knights Foundation Grant in 2011 (selected from 1700 submissions) to create a literary arts center in Philadelphia, PA, called Musehouse: a Center for the Literary Arts.

She was the author of Slamming Open the Door (Alice James Books, 2009), which was the 2008 Beatrice Hawley Award winner and the 9th best-selling poetry book in 2009. It received a positive, full-page review in The New York Times,, while Library Journal praised it as "A stunning first book." Bonanno was interviewed about her writing of the book on NPR's Fresh Air by Terri Gross, who began the interview by praising the book, "I really love the poems we're about to hear. They're beautifully written. But some of them really hurt. They're about the worst thing that can happen to a mother, the murder of her child." The poems in Slamming Open the Door tell the story of the aftermath of the murder of the author’s daughter, Leidy Bonanno, who was strangled in 2003 by an ex-boyfriend, just after she had graduated from nursing school. Bonanno was an advocate for victims’ rights and a member of the Montgomery County Parents of Murdered Children. She was honored with a 2008 “Women of Courage/Women of Inspiration Purple Ribbon Award” from Lutheran Settlement House in Philadelphia.

Bonanno was born in Reading, Pennsylvania, and received an undergraduate degree in English and a master’s in education from Temple University. She taught at Dobbins High School for five years and at Cheltenham High School for thirteen years. She was married to David Bonanno, a native of Caldwell, New Jersey and co-editor of The American Poetry Review.
