= Amy Newman =

American poet

- Education: Ohio University (PhD)
- Occupations: Poet; translator; professor
- Spouse: Joe Bonomo
- Writing career
- Language: English
- Genre: Poetry
- Notable works: Dear Editor; On This Day in Poetry History; Camera Lyrica
- Notable awards: Beatrice Hawley Award; John Frederick Nims Memorial Prize

Amy Newman is an American poet, translator, and professor. She is a Presidential Research Professor at Northern Illinois University.

== Life and career ==
Newman graduated with a Ph.D. in English literature and language from Ohio University.

Newman is the author of six collections of poems, most recently An Incomplete Encyclopedia of Happiness and Unhappiness (Persea Books). Her other books include On This Day in Poetry History; Dear Editor, winner of the Lexi Rudnitsky Editor's Choice Award; fall; Camera Lyrica, winner of the Beatrice Hawley Award; and her first book, Order, or Disorder, which received the Cleveland State University Poetry Center Prize.

Newman has received fellowships in poetry from the MacDowell Colony and the Ohio and Illinois Arts Councils. She was awarded the Friends of Literature Prize from the Poetry Foundation for her poem "Howl", the John Frederick Nims Memorial Prize for Translation for her translations of the Italian poet Antonia Pozzi, and the Neil Postman Prize in Metaphor from Rattle magazine.

Newman's poems have appeared in literary journals and magazines, including The Kenyon Review, The Missouri Review, Hotel Amerika, The Ohio Review, Colorado Review, Denver Quarterly, The Gettysburg Review, Hayden's Ferry Review, Willow Springs, Indiana Review, The Carolina Quarterly, and The Connecticut Poetry Review, and in anthologies including The Iowa Anthology of New American Poetries, The Rose Metal Press Field Guide to Prose Poetry, An Introduction to the Prose Poem, Lit from Inside: 40 Years of Poetry from Alice James Books, and The Hide-and-Seek Muse: Annotations of Contemporary Poetry. Her poetry has been translated and published in Italy and Romania.

Newman was named the poetry critic at the Chicago Sun-Times in October 2006 and in the same month served as online poet-in-residence for the British newspaper The Guardian. She has published articles on the poets Agha Shahid Ali, W. S. Merwin, Jean Valentine, Adrienne Rich, and Theodore Roethke.

== Personal life ==
Newman lives in DeKalb with her husband, the essayist and music writer Joe Bonomo.

== Published works ==
=== Full-length poetry collections ===
- An Incomplete Encyclopedia of Happiness and Unhappiness (Persea Books, 2024)
- On This Day in Poetry History (Persea Books, 2016)
- Dear Editor (Persea Books, 2012)
- fall (Wesleyan University Press, 2004/2006)
- Camera Lyrica (Alice James Books, 1999)
- Order, or Disorder (Cleveland State University Poetry Center, 1996)

=== Chapbooks ===
- The Sin Sonnets: A Redouble (Scantily Clad Press, 2009)
- The BirdGirl Handbook (Green Tower Press, 2006)

== Sources ==
- Ohio University Department of English > Alumni: Amy Newman
- Alice James Books > Author Page > Amy Newman
