= Lily Brown =

American poet

Lily Brown (born March 20, 1981, in Boston, Massachusetts) is an American poet.

Brown is author of the poetry collection Rust or Go Missing (Cleveland State University Poetry Center, 2011) and Blade Work (Parlor Press, 2025), the latter receiving the Maine Literary Award for poetry in 2026. Her poetry has appeared in journals such as American Letters and Commentary, Colorado Review, Denver Quarterly, Fence, Gulf Coast, Pleiades, and Tarpaulin Sky.

Brown holds an A.B. in women's studies from Harvard College, an M.F.A. in creative writing from Saint Mary's College of California, and a PhD in literature from the University of Georgia. She is the grand-niece of artist Mary Meigs and the great-great-grand-niece of Civil War general Montgomery Meigs.
