= Emily Kendal Frey =

American poet

Emily Kendal Frey (born January 20, 1976, in McLean, Virginia) is an American poet.

Frey is the author of the full-length poetry collections The Grief Performance (Cleveland State University Poetry Center, 2011), Sorrow Arrow (Octopus Books, 2014), and LOVABILITY (Fonograf Editions, 2021); the chapbooks Frances (Poor Claudia, 2010), The New Planet (Mindmade Books, 2010), and Airport (Blue Hour, 2009); as well as three chapbook collaborations. Frey’s The Grief Performance was selected for the Cleveland State Poetry Center’s 2010 First Book Prize by Rae Armantrout. She also won the Poetry Society of America's 2012 Norma Farber First Book Award. Frey’s poetry also appears in journals such as Octopus and The Oregonian.

Frey received a B.A. from The Colorado College in Colorado Springs, Colorado, and an M.F.A. from Emerson College in Boston, Massachusetts. She lives in Portland, Oregon.
