= Helena Mesa =

American poet (born 1972)

Helena Mesa (born 1972) is an American poet.

Mesa is the author of two poetry collections, Where Land Is Indistinguishable from Sea (Terrapin Books, 2023) and Horse Dance Underwater (Cleveland State University Poetry Center, 2009). She is also a co-editor of an anthology of essays, with Blas Falconer and Beth Martinelli, titled Mentor and Muse: Essays from Poets to Poets (Southern Illinois University Press, 2010). In 2010 she was a Residency Recipient from Writers in the Heartland. Mesa's poems have been in journals such as Barrow Street, Bat City Review, Indiana Review, Poet Lore and Third Coast.

Helena Mesa was born and raised in Pittsburgh, Pennsylvania to Cuban parents. She is a former writer for Writers in the Schools (WITS) in Houston, Texas. She has a Bachelor of Arts from Indiana University Bloomington, a Master of Fine Arts from the University of Maryland and a Ph.D. from the University of Houston. Currently, she lives in Ann Arbor, MI and is an associate professor of English at Albion College.
