= B. H. Fairchild =

American poet and academic (born 1942)

B.H. Fairchild (born 1942) is an American poet and former college professor. His most recent book is An Ordinary Life (W.W. Norton, 2023), and his poems have appeared in literary journals and magazines including The New Yorker, The Paris Review, The Southern Review, Poetry, TriQuarterly, The Hudson Review, Salmagundi, The Sewanee Review. His third poetry collection, The Art of the Lathe, winner of the 1997 Beatrice Hawley Award (Alice James Books, 1998), brought Fairchild's work to national prominence, garnering him a large number of awards and fellowships including the William Carlos Williams Award, Kingsley Tufts Poetry Award, California Book Award, Natalie Ornish Poetry Award, PEN Center USA West Poetry Award, National Book Award (finalist), Capricorn Poetry Award, and Rockefeller and Guggenheim fellowships. The book ultimately gave him international prominence, as The Waywiser Press in England published the U.K. edition of the book. The Los Angeles Times wrote that "The Art of the Lathe by B.H. Fairchild has become a contemporary classic—a passionate example of the plain style, so finely crafted and perfectly pitched...workhorse narratives suffused with tenderness and elegiac music."

Fairchild has written that a fellowship from the National Endowment for the Arts was vital to his career as a poet: "It's very simple: without an NEA Fellowship in 1989–90, I would not have been able to complete my second book, Local Knowledge, nor have had the necessary time to compose the core poems for The Art of the Lathe, my third book, which, I am proud to say, received the Kingsley Tufts Award and was a finalist for the National Book Award, thus bringing my work to a wider audience than the immediate members of my family and also, therefore, making future work possible."

He was born in Houston, Texas, and grew up in small towns in the oil fields of Oklahoma, Texas, and Kansas, later working through high school and college for his father, a lathe machinist. He taught English and Creative Writing at California State University, San Bernardino and Claremont Graduate University. He lives in Claremont, California with his wife, Patti, and dog, Minnie. As of 2011, it has been announced that Fairchild will teach at The University of North Texas.

== Books ==
Full-Length Poetry Collections

- An Ordinary Life (W. W. Norton, 2023)
- The Blue Buick: New and Selected Poems (W. W. Norton, 2014)
- Usher (W. W. Norton, 2009)
- Local Knowledge (W. W. Norton, 2005, second edition)
- Early Occult Memory Systems of the Lower Midwest (W. W. Norton, 2003)
- The Arrival of the Future (Alice James Books, 2000, second edition)
- The Art of the Lathe (Alice James Books, 1998)
- Local Knowledge (Quarterly Review of Literature, Princeton, NJ, 1991)
- The Arrival of the Future (illustrated by Ross Zirkle, Swallow's Tale Press, 1985; Livingston Publishing, 1985)

Chapbooks

- The System of Which the Body Is One Part (State Street Press, 1988)
- Flight (Devil's Millhopper Press, 1985)
- C & W Machine Works (Trilobite Press, 1983)

Special Editions

- Trilogy, with an introduction by Paul Mariani and engravings by Barry Moser. (Pennyroyal Press, 2008)

Literary Criticism

- Such Holy Song: Music as Idea, Form, and Image in the Poetry of William Blake (Kent State University Press, 1980)

== Honors and awards ==
- 2015 The Paterson Poetry Prize
- 2015 The Blue Buick, one of two books of poetry chosen for the RUSA/ALA Notable Books List
- 2014 John William Corrington Award for Literary Excellence from Centenary College
- 2014 Pushcart Prize in Poetry for "The Story"
- 2011 Pushcart Prize in the Essay for "Logophilia"
- 2010 Best of the Net Award for "The Student Assistant"
- 2009 Pushcart Prize in Poetry for "Frieda Pushnik"
- 2007 University of Kansas Distinguished Achievement Award
- 2005 Lannan Foundation Residency in Marfa, Texas
- 2005 Gold Medal in Poetry, California Book Awards
- 2005 Aiken Taylor Award for Modern American Poetry
- 2005 National Endowment for the Arts – Literature Fellowship in Poetry
- 2004 Bobbitt National Prize for Poetry
- 2002 Arthur Rense Prize, from the American Academy of Arts and Letters
- 2002 National Book Critics Circle Award, for Early Occult Memory Systems of the Lower Midwest
- 2001 The Frost Place poet in residence
- 2000 Rockefeller Fellowship
- 1999 Guggenheim Fellowship
- 1999 William Carlos Williams Award
- 1999 Kingsley Tufts Poetry Award
- 1999 California Book Award
- 1999 Natalie Ornish Poetry Award
- 1999 PEN Center USA West Poetry Award
- 1998 Finalist, National Book Award
- 1997 Beatrice Hawley Award
- 1996 Capricorn Poetry Award
- 1988 National Endowment for the Arts – Literature Fellowship in Poetry
- Walter E. Dakin Fellowship to the Sewanee Writers Conference
- National Writers’ Union First Prize
- AWP Anniversary Award
