= Mary Szybist =

American poet (born 1970)

- Born: September 20, 1970 (age 55); Williamsport, Pennsylvania, United States
- Education: University of Virginia (1992, BA) (1994, MT); Iowa Writers' Workshop (1996, MFA)
- Occupations: Poet, Professor
- Writing career
- Genre: Poetry
- Notable awards: 2013 National Book Award for Poetry; 2003 Beatrice Hawley Award

Mary Szybist (born 20 September 1970) is an American poet. She won the National Book Award for Poetry for her collection Incarnadine.

== Life ==
She grew up in Pennsylvania, earned her B.A. and M.T. (Master of Teaching) from the University of Virginia, and attended the Iowa Writers' Workshop, where she was a Teaching-Writing Fellow.

Szybist's Incarnadine (Graywolf Press, 2013) was the recipient of the 2013 National Book Award for Poetry, and her collection Granted (Alice James Books, 2003) won the 2003 Beatrice Hawley Award from Alice James Books and the 2004 Great Lakes Colleges Association New Writers Award, and was a finalist for the 2004 National Book Critics Circle Award in Poetry.

In a feature on NBCCA poetry finalists, the Christian Science Monitor wrote:

...with her intelligence and understated grace, Szybist may become one of the best-known writers of her generation.

Szybist's poetry has appeared in Denver Quarterly, Colorado Review, AGNI, Virginia Quarterly Review, The Iowa Review, Poetry, Tin House, and The Kenyon Review, and The Best American Poetry 2008.

Szybist is an associate professor of English at Lewis & Clark College in Portland, Oregon, and a faculty member at the Warren Wilson College MFA Program for Writers. She also has taught at Kenyon College, the University of Iowa, the Tennessee Governor’s School for Humanities, the University of Virginia’s Young Writers’ Workshop, and West High School in Iowa City.

== Honors and awards ==
- 2019 Laureate of The George W. Hunt, S.J., Prize for Journalism, Arts & Letters
- 2013 National Book Award for Poetry
- 2009 National Endowment for the Arts Literature Fellowship
- 2009 Witter Bynner Fellowship
- 2004 Great Lakes Colleges Association New Writers Award
- 2003 National Book Critics Circle Award Finalist
- 2002 Beatrice Hawley Award
- 1996 Rona Jaffe Foundation Writers' Award
- Academy of American Poets Prize

== Bibliography ==
=== Poetry ===
- Incarnadine: Poems. Graywolf Press. 17 December 2013. ISBN 978-1-55597-330-8.
- Granted, Alice James Books, 2003, ISBN 9781882295371

==== List of poems ====
Title	Year	First published	Reprinted/collected in
Troubadour			Wright, Charles; Lehman, David, eds. (2008). "Troubadour". The Best American Poetry 2008. Simon and Schuster. pp. 128–129.
On a spring day in Baltimore the art teacher asks the class to draw flowers	2011	Szybist, Mary (Fall 2011). "On a spring day in Baltimore the art teacher asks the class to draw flowers". The Kenyon Review. 33 (4).	Henderson, Bill, ed. (2013). "On a spring day in Baltimore the art teacher asks the class to draw flowers". The Pushcart Prize XXXVII : best of the small presses 2013. Pushcart Press. pp. 232–233.
