= Kevin Goodan =

American poet and professor

Kevin Goodan is an American poet and professor. His most recent book is Spot Weather Forecast (Alice James Books, 2021). His first book, In the Ghost-House Acquainted, won a New England/New York Award from Alice James Books, as well as the 2005 L.L. Winship/PEN New England Award. His poems have been published in Ploughshares, Colorado Review, Crazyhorse, Mid-American Review, American Poet Magazine, Cutbank, and other journals.

Raised on the Flathead Indian Reservation in Western Montana, Goodan began working for the U.S. Forest Service at a young age. He has lived in Northern Ireland and western Massachusetts. He received his M.F.A. degree from the MFA Program for Poets & Writers at the University of Massachusetts Amherst and his B.A. degree from the University of Montana. He has taught at the University of Connecticut and as Visiting Writer at Wesleyan University. He was formerly employed at Lewis-Clark State College, and is currently an adjunct professor at Colby-Sawyer College.

== Published works ==
Full-length Poetry Collections

- Spot Weather Forecast (Alice James Books, 2021)
- Anaphora (Alice James Books, 2018)
- Let the Voices (Red Hen Press, 2016)
- Upper Level Disturbances (Colorado State University/Center for Literary Publishing 2012)
- Winter Tenor (Alice James Books, 2009)
- In the Ghost-House Acquainted (Alice James Books, 2004)

Chapbooks

- Thine Embers Fly: Ten Poems (Factory Hollow Press, 2007)

== Awards ==
- 2005 L. L. Winship/PEN New England Award, In the Ghost-House Acquainted
- New York/New England Award (Alice James Books)
