= Prairie Schooner =

US literary magazine

- Fall 2010 issue cover
- Discipline: Literature
- Language: English
- Edited by: Timothy Schaffert

Publication details
- History: 1926–present
- Publisher: University of Nebraska Press for the University of Nebraska–Lincoln (United States)
- Frequency: Quarterly

Standard abbreviations
- ISO 4: Prairie Schoon.

Indexing
- ISSN: 0032-6682
- JSTOR: 00326682

Links
- Journal homepage; Prairie Schooner at the University of Nebraska Press

Prairie Schooner is a literary magazine published quarterly at the University of Nebraska–Lincoln with the cooperation of UNL's English Department and the University of Nebraska Press. It is based in Lincoln, Nebraska and was first published in 1926. It was founded by Lowry Wimberly and a small group of his students, who together formed the Wordsmith Chapter of Sigma Upsilon (a national honorary literary society).

Although many assume it is a regional magazine, it is nationally and internationally distributed and publishes writers from all over the United States and the world.

Prairie Schooner has garnered selections and honorable mentions in the Pushcart Prize anthologies and various of the Best American series, including Best American Short Stories, Best American Essays, Best American Mystery Stories, and Best American Nonrequired Reading.

== Editors ==
Prairie Schooner's current editor (from 2025) is Timothy Schaffert, novelist and Adele Hall Professor of English and director of creative writing at the university.

=== Previous editors ===
- 2011-2025 Kwame Dawes
- 1987–2011 Hilda Raz
- 1980–1987 Hugh Luke
- 1963–1980 Bernice Slote
- 1956–1963 Karl Shapiro
- 1926–1956 Lowry Wimberly

== Notable contributors ==
- Jacob M. Appel
- Beth Bachmann
- Joseph Payne Brennan
- Charles Bukowski
- Robert Olen Butler
- Truman Capote
- Raymond Carver
- Judith Ortiz Cofer
- Rita Dove
- Richard Foerster
- Roxane Gay
- Marilyn Hacker
- Lillian Halegua
- Albert Halper
- Michael Derrick Hudson
- Honorée Fanonne Jeffers
- Hugh Kenner
- Jesse Lee Kercheval
- Russell Kirk
- Ted Kooser
- Diane Lockward
- Lee Martin
- Joyce Carol Oates
- Sharon Olds
- Alicia Ostriker
- Lori Ostlund
- Octavio Paz
- Robert Peters
- Carol Potter
- Alberto Rios
- Susanna Roxman
- Mari Sandoz
- Susan Fromberg Schaeffer
- Tim Schaffert
- Enid Shomer
- R. T. Smith
- Jim Thompson
- Chris Ware
- Eudora Welty
- Tennessee Williams
- Ladette Randolph

== Glenna Luschei Fund and awards ==
In 2001, the magazine and its editorship were endowed in perpetuity by poet and literary philanthropist Glenna Luschei under the Glenna Luschei Fund for Excellence at the University of Nebraska Foundation. In addition to funding the magazine and its special projects, the endowment funds one $1,500 Glenna Luschei Prairie Schooner Award and ten $250 Glenna Luschei Prairie Schooner Awards every year. The Glenna Luschei Prize for African Poetry is run by the African Poetry Book Fund in partnership with Prairie Schooner and is also named for and funded by Glenna Luschei.

== Raz-Shumaker Prairie Schooner Book Prize ==
The Raz-Shumaker Prairie Schooner Book Prize is an American literary award presented yearly since 2003, one award for poetry and one award for fiction. It is run by the literary magazine Prairie Schooner and University of Nebraska Press. Winners receive $3,000 and publication through the University of Nebraska Press. Manuscripts are accepted from all living writers, including non-US citizens, writing in English.

=== Past winners ===
Year	Fiction	Poetry
2003	K. L. Cook, Last Call	Cortney Davis, Leopold's Maneuvers
2004	Brock Clarke, Carrying the Torch	Rynn Williams, Adonis Garage
2005	John Keeble, Nocturnal America	Kathleen Flenniken, Famous
2006	Jesse Lee Kercheval, The Alice Stories	Paul Guest, Notes for My Body Double
2007	Katherine Vaz, Our Lady of the Artichokes and Other Portuguese-American Stories	Mari L'Esperance, The Darkened Temple
2008	Anne Finger, Call Me Ahab	Kara Candito, Taste of Cherry
2009	Ted Gilley, Bliss, and Other Short Stories	Shane Book, Ceiling of Sticks
2010	Greg Hrbek, Destroy All Monsters	James Crews, The Book of What Stays
2011	Karen Brown, Little Sinners (submitted as "Leaf House")	Susan Blackwell Ramsey, A Mind Like This
2012	Xhenet Aliu, Domesticated Wild Things	Orlando Ricardo Menes, Fetish
2013	Amina Gautier, Now We Will Be Happy	R. A. Villanueva, Reliquaria
2014	Bryn Chancellor, When Are You Coming Home?	Jennifer Perrine, No Confession, No Mass
2015	Dustin M. Hoffman, One-Hundred Knuckled Fist	Safiya Sinclair, Cannibal
2016	Venita Blackburn, Black Jesus and Other Superheroes	Susan Gubernat, The Zoo at Night
2017	Sara Batkie, Better Times	Luisa Muradyan, American Radiance
2018	Liz Breazeale, Extinction Events: Stories	Aria Aber, Hard Damage
2019	Megan Cummins, If the Body Allows It	Jihyun Yun, Some Are Always Hungry
2020	Kristina Gorcheva-Newberry, What Isn't Remembered	Susan Nguyen, Dear Diaspora
2021	Karin Lin-Greenberg, Vanished	Mónica Gomery, Might Kindred
2022	Gen Del Raye, Boundless Deep and Other Stores	Jared Harél, Let Our Bodies Change the Subject
2023	Janelle Bassett, Thanks for This Riot	Lory Bedikian, Jagadakeer: Apology to the Body
2024	Mi Jin Kim, Invitation	Gbenga Adesina, Death Does Not End At The Sea
2025	Micah Dean Hicks, Vulture Gold	Adam O. Davis, Pyrrhic Symphony

== In popular culture ==
Stephen King's novella "Rat" centers on a fiction writer who publishes a story in Prairie Schooner.
