= Elyse Fenton =

American poet

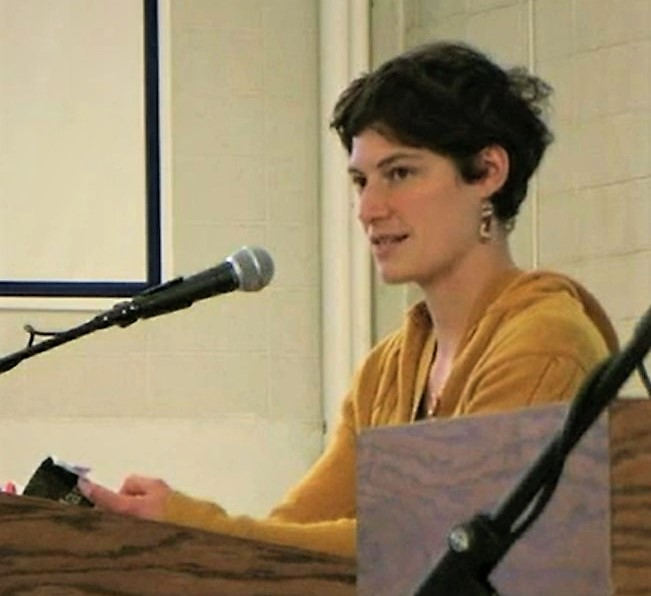
Fenton at Franklin & Marshall College in 2011

Elyse Fenton (born September 4, 1980 in Brookline, Massachusetts) is an American poet.

Fenton is the author of the poetry collections Clamor (Cleveland State University Poetry Center, 2010) which was selected for the 2009 Cleveland State University Poetry Center First Book Prize by D. A. Powell and Sweet Insurgent (Saturnalia, 2017). Fenton’s Clamor also received the 2010 University of Wales Dylan Thomas Prize and the 2011 Bob Bush Memorial Award for First Book of Poetry from the Texas Institute of Letters. She was recipient of the 2008 Pablo Neruda Award from the Nimrod International Literary Journal. Fenton’s poetry and nonfiction have appeared in numerous publications including The Iowa Review, The Massachusetts Review, and The New York Times. She was featured in Poetry Society of America's New American Poets 2011 selected by Rachel Zucker.

Fenton received her B.A. from Reed College and her M.F.A. from the University of Oregon.
