= Joe Bonomo =

American writer

- Born: Wheaton, Maryland, U.S.
- Education: University of Maryland (BA); Ohio University (MA, PhD)
- Occupations: Essayist; music writer; professor
- Spouse: Amy Newman
- Writing career
- Language: English
- Years active: 1995–present
- Genres: Essay; music criticism
- Notable works: Sweat: The Story of the Fleshtones; AC/DC's Highway to Hell; Installations; No Place I Would Rather Be
- Notable awards: National Poetry Series

Joe Bonomo (buh-NOH-moh) is an American essayist and music writer. He is the author of books on subjects including AC/DC, Jerry Lee Lewis, The Fleshtones, and the baseball writer Roger Angell.

== Life and career ==
Bonomo was born and raised in Wheaton, Maryland. He graduated from the University of Maryland and Ohio University.

In 2012 Bonomo was named the music columnist for The Normal School literary magazine, for which he writes two essays annually. Two of his books, Jerry Lee Lewis: Lost and Found and Sweat, have been translated into French; the latter was published in France as The Fleshtones: Histoire d'un Groupe de Garage Américain.

He has published personal essays widely since the mid-1990s in Creative Nonfiction, The Normal School, Fourth Genre, Brevity, Defunct, Hotel Amerika, Diagram, Free Verse, Georgia Review, Gulf Coast, Laurel Review, Quarter After Eight, River Teeth, Seneca Review, Sentence, and elsewhere, as well as in the anthologies Brief Encounters: An Anthology of Short Nonfiction; How to Write About Music; and The Rose Metal Press Field Guide to Prose Poetry.

From 1995 to 2026 he taught creative nonfiction and literature at Northern Illinois University. He lives with his wife, the translator Amy Newman, in DeKalb, Illinois.

== Books ==
- Sweat: The Story of the Fleshtones, America's Garage Band (Bloomsbury, 2007)
- Installations (National Poetry Series, Penguin Books, 2008)
- Jerry Lee Lewis: Lost and Found (Bloomsbury, 2009)
- AC/DC's Highway to Hell (33 1/3 Series, Continuum Intl Pub Group, 2010)
- Conversations with Greil Marcus (Literary Conversations Series, University Press of Mississippi, 2012)
- This Must Be Where My Obsession with Infinity Began, essays (Orphan Press, 2013)
- Field Recordings from the Inside, essays (Soft Skull Press, 2017)
- No Place I Would Rather Be: Roger Angell and a Life in Baseball Writing (University of Nebraska Press, 2019)
- Play This Book Loud: Noisy Essays (University of Georgia Press, 2025)

== Audiobooks ==
- AC/DC's Highway to Hell, read by Heath Miller (Spotify Audiobooks, 2025)

== Awards ==
- Illinois Arts Council Fellowships
- Award for Excellence in Undergraduate Instruction (Northern Illinois University)
- National Poetry Series
- Orphan Press Creative Nonfiction Book Award
