= Allison Titus =

American poet

Allison Titus is an American poet. Titus is the author of the poetry collection Sum of Every Lost Ship (Cleveland State University Poetry Center, 2009), the chapbook Instructions from the Narwhal (Bateau Press, 2006) and the novel The Arsonist's Song Has Nothing to Do with Fire (Etruscan Press 2014). Her chapbook was the winner of the Bateau Press BOOM Chapbook Prize. She is the recipient of the 2011 Literature Fellowship in Creative Writing from The National Endowment for the Arts (NEA). Titus's poems and stories have appeared in Blackbird, Crazyhorse, Denver Quarterly, Ninth Letter, and Sycamore Review.

Allison Titus received her B.A. at the University of Mary Washington, an M.F.A in fiction from Virginia Commonwealth University in 2003 and her M.F.A. in poetry from Vermont College in 2005. She currently lives in Richmond, Virginia with her husband, the poet Joshua Poteat.
