= Richard McCann =

American writer and academic (1949–2021)

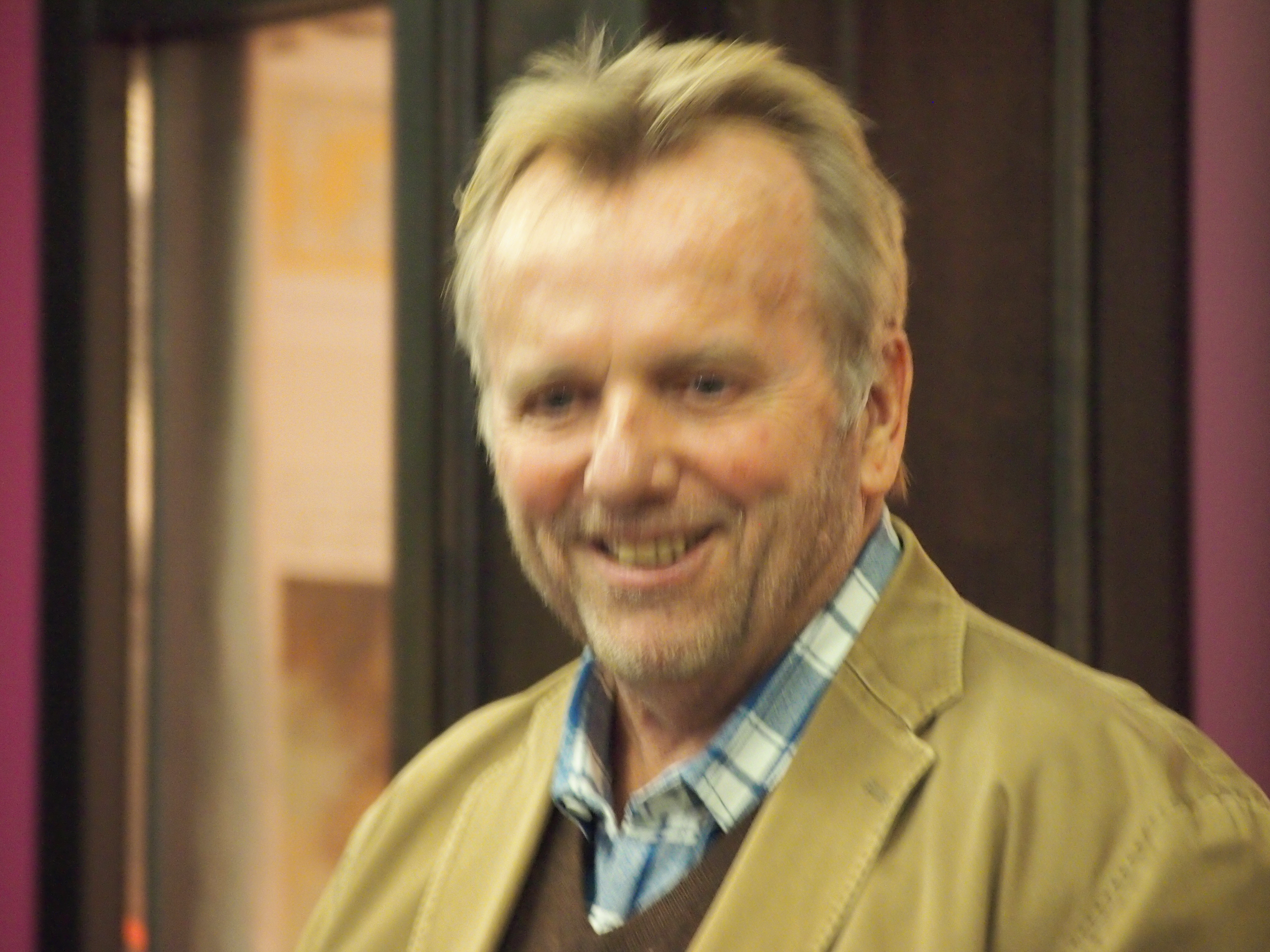
- Born: December 12, 1949
- Died: January 25, 2021 (aged 71); Washington, D.C.
- Education: MA in Creative Writing and Modern Literature, Hollins University. MA and PhD in American Studies from the University of Iowa
- Alma mater: Iowa
- Occupations: Writer, professor
- Writing career
- Period: 20th & 21st centuries
- Genres: Poetry, Nonfiction, Gay literature Memoir
- Notable awards: Guggenheim, Fulbright, Rockefeller, NEA

Richard John McCann (December 12, 1949 – January 24, 2021) was an American writer of fiction, nonfiction, and poetry. He lived in Washington, D.C., where he was a longtime professor in the MFA Program in Creative Writing at American University.

As a teenager, he wrote to Bette Davis, whose work he greatly admired; they shared a correspondence which he recounted in a 2016 article in the Washington Post.

== Career ==
A gay writer, he was the author of Mother of Sorrows, a collection of linked stories that novelist Michael Cunningham has described as "almost unbearably beautiful." It won the 2005 John C. Zacharis First Book Award from Ploughshares and was also an American Library Association Stonewall Book Award recipient, as well as a finalist for the Lambda Literary Award. Amazon named it one of the Top 50 Books of 2005.

McCann's book of poems, Ghost Letters, won the 1994 Beatrice Hawley and Capricorn Poetry awards. With Michael Klein, he edited Things Shaped in Passing: More 'Poets for Life' Writing from the AIDS Pandemic. His stories, poems, and essays have appeared in The Atlantic, Esquire, Ms., Tin House, Ploughshares, and numerous anthologies, including The O. Henry Prize Stories 2007, Best American Essays 2000, and The Penguin Book of Gay Short Stories. He has received fellowships from the Guggenheim and Rockefeller foundations and the Yaddo Corporation. In 2010, he was the Master Artist at The Atlantic Center for the Arts in New Smyrna Beach, Florida.

McCann was the writer-in-residence at the Jenny McKean Moore program at George Washington University in 1987-88. He then became a professor of creative writing and director of the MFA program at American University in 1988, where he remained director until 2002, and continued to teach in the program until his retirement in 2017. He was known for his teaching of literary nonfiction and memoir. McCann received the AU Scholar-Teacher of the Year award in 2005, organized the MFA Visiting Writers series, and continued to teach his literary nonfiction course even after retirement

McCann was associated with the town of Provincetown, Massachusetts, where he lived intermittently since the 1970s and where he served on the board of trustees of the Fine Arts Work Center. He was twice a fellow at the Work Center, in 1972-1973 and in 1993-1994, and served on its board of trustees from 2000 to 2008. He also taught writing during the center’s summer program for many years. He also served on the board of directors of the PEN/Faulkner Foundation in Washington, D.C., and was a Member of the Corporation of Yaddo in Saratoga Springs, New York.

The Pen/Faulkner Foundation announced his death on January 25, 2021, at the age of 71.
