= Zach Savich =

American poet (born 1982)

Zach Savich (born December 1, 1982, in Lansing, Michigan) is an American poet.

== Life ==
Savich is the author of the poetry collections Full Catastrophe Living (University of Iowa Press, 2009) which won the 2008 Iowa Poetry Prize; Annulments (University of Colorado Press, 2010) which won the 2010 Colorado Prize for Poetry; and The Firestorm (Cleveland State University Poetry Center, 2011) which won the 2010 Cleveland State University Poetry Center Open Competition. He is also the author of the chapbook The Man Who Lost His Head (Omnidawn, 2010) selected by Elizabeth Robinson as the winner of the 2010 Omnidawn Chapbook Poetry Prize and a nonfiction book, Events Film Cannot Withstand (Rescue+Press, 2011 ). His poems, essays, and reviews have appeared in numerous journals and anthologies, including A Public Space, Colorado Review, the Denver Quarterly, Gulf Coast, and Best New Poets 2008.

Savich received a B.A. in English from the University of Washington an M.F.A. from the University of Iowa Writers’ Workshop and a second M.F.A from the program for Poets and Writers at University of Massachusetts Amherst. He currently teaches at the University of the Arts, and serves as book review editor with The Kenyon Review.
