= Association of Vermont Independent Colleges =

Coordinates: 44.254906°N 72.568227°W

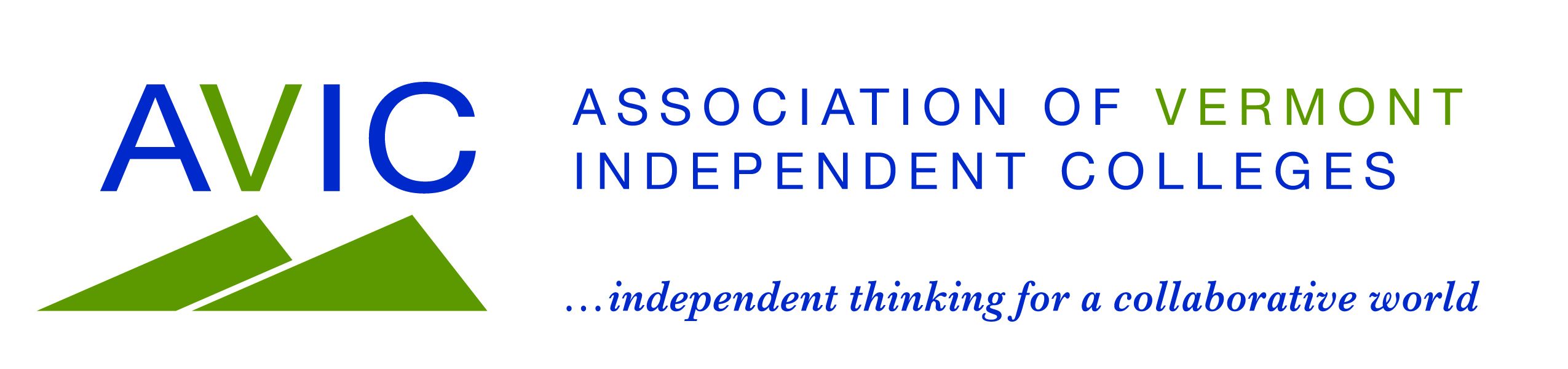
AVIC logo

Association of Vermont Independent Colleges (AVIC) is a membership industry organization for independent Vermont higher education institutions. It was founded in 1982 and is located in Montpelier, Vermont, the state capital.

AVIC services school administrators and leaders of 10 private institutions. AVIC is a member of the National Association of Independent Colleges and Universities.

== Organization ==
The organizational structure is as a 501c(3) not-for-profit with a board and a president.

=== President ===
- Susan Stitely (2008–2022)
- Kimberley Jessup (2022–present)

== Membership ==
AVIC members include all nine private colleges in Vermont:

- Bennington College, founded 1932
- Champlain College, founded 1878
- Landmark College, founded 1985
- Middlebury College, founded 1800
- Norwich University, founded 1819
- Saint Michael's College, founded 1904
- School for International Training, founded 1964
- Vermont College of Fine Arts, founded 1834
- Vermont Law & Graduate School, founded 1972

In addition, the Center for Cartoon Studies, which is not regionally accredited, but is approved to grant the Master of Fine Arts degree and certificates by the State of Vermont Agency of Education is also a member.

== Mission ==
The organization's mission is to broadly inform both decision-makers and the public about the role that independent colleges and universities can play in the future of Vermont and the nation, shape public policy, and support the work of campus leaders, specifically through increasing the quality and access to higher education in Vermont, focusing cooperation among member institutions, and attracting students who will contribute to the state's future workforce as well as the economic, civic, and cultural life of Vermont.
