= Kara Candito =

American poet, author and, educator

Kara Candito is an American author and educator. She is a Creative Writing Professor at the University of Wisconsin-Platteville and co-curator of the Monsters of Poetry reading series in Madison, Wisconsin.

== Education ==
Candito earned a PhD in creative writing and literary theory at Florida State University, and a MFA in creative writing at the University of Maryland.

== Works and publications ==
Her work has been published in literary journals including AGNI, The Kenyon Review, and Drunken Boat. She has also been anthologized in A Face to Meet the Faces: An Anthology of Contemporary Persona Poetry (2012) and Best New Poets 2007.

Candito has served as editor in chief of the Driftless Review and has been a co-curator of the Monsters of Poetry reading series.

== Awards ==
Her book Taste of Cherry won the Prairie Schooner Book Prize in Poetry, and her poetry collection Spectator received the Agha Shahid Ali Poetry Prize. She has received other awards, including an Academy of American Poets Prize and scholarships from the Bread Loaf Writers' Conference, the Council for Wisconsin Writers, the Vermont Studio Center, the MacDowell Colony, and the Santa Fe Arts Institute. Her work has appeared in such journals as AGNI, jubilat, The Kenyon Review, Indiana Review, and Drunken Boat.

== Personal life ==
Candito was born in Boston, Massachusetts. She resides in Madison, Wisconsin.
