= Chloe Honum =

New Zealand-American poet

Chloe Honum (born 1981) is a New Zealand-American poet and professor. She was born in Santa Monica, California, and was raised in Auckland, New Zealand, and holds dual-citizenship. She earned her B.A. from Sarah Lawrence College in 2003, her M.F.A in Poetry from University of Arkansas in 2010, and her Ph.D. in Poetry from Texas Tech University in 2016.

She is currently an Associate Professor of Poetry at Baylor University in Texas. Her interests are listed as creative writing poetry and postmodern American poetry.

She has won a Pushcart Prize, and received a Ruth Lilly Fellowship alongside fellowships from the MacDowell Colony, the Kerouac House of Orlando, and the Djerassi Resident Artists Program. In 2019, Honum was the recipient of the Grimshaw Sargeson Fellowship and focused her work on forced adoptions in New Zealand during the 1950s through the 1970s. The collection was tentatively named The Girl Alone. She also earned a Texas Institute of Letters Award.

Her work has been published in Poetry magazine, The Adroit Journal, Blackbird, Tupelo Quarterly, and Shenandoah.

Honum cites her background as a ballerina in her youth as an influence, stating, "As in ballet, in poetry I’m drawn to precision, strength, and music." She has stated that grief was "what first drew her to poetry", and her poetry often deals heavily with the loss of her mother, who committed suicide when Honum was 17.

== Works ==
Her first book, The Tulip-Flame, was published in 2014 which was selected by Tracy K. Smith for the Cleveland State University Poetry Center First Book Prize. Catherine Pond from the Los Angeles Review of Books described the collection as, "In fact, what the collection lacks is in many ways its greatest strength. Patience is Honum’s virtuosity. She is taking her time. This is how poetry is meant to be written – and read."

Her next book, Then Winter, was published in 2017 by Bull City Press.

Her most recent collection, The Lantern Room, was published in 2022 by Tupelo Press.
