= Human Hours =

2018 poetry collection

- First edition
- Author: Catherine Barnett
- Genre: Poetry
- Publisher: Graywolf Press
- Publication date: 2018

Human Hours is a 2018 collection of poetry and essays written by Catherine Barnett, published by Graywolf Press. The collection received positive reviews.

== Development ==
Originally, Barnett intended to call the book The Accursed Questions. Barnett first heard the term from poet Ilya Kaminsky, in reference to the "huge questions of humanity" addressed by "nineteenth-century Russian novelists".

Barnett drew inspiration from Ellen Bryant Voigt's collection Headwaters and Samuel Beckett's 1961 play Happy Days during the book's composition.

== Reception ==
A review in Publishers Weekly referred to the book as "elegantly understated".
