= Landmark College =

Private college in Putney, Vermont, US

- Motto: Nosce te ipsum
- Motto in English: Know Thyself
- Type: Private college
- Established: 1985; 41 years ago
- Founder: Charles Drake
- Accreditation: NECHE
- Affiliations: Six College Collaborative, Association of Vermont Independent Colleges
- Endowment: $24.4 million (2022)
- President: Jim Dlugos
- Faculty: 56 FT/ 28 PT
- Students: 650 (2023)
- Undergraduates: 598 (2023)
- Postgraduates: 52 (2023)
- Location: 19 River Road South, Putney, Vermont, 05346, United States; 42°58′36″N 72°30′43″W
- Campus: Rural
- Colors: Blue and gold
- Mascot: Finn the Shark
- Website: www.landmark.edu

Landmark College is a private college in Putney, Vermont, United States, that is designed exclusively for students who learn differently, including those with a learning disability (such as dyslexia), ADHD, autism or executive function challenges. It was established in 1985 and was the first institution of higher learning to pioneer college-level studies for students with dyslexia.

The college offers associate and bachelor's degree programs in the liberal arts and sciences. It is accredited by the New England Commission of Higher Education (NECHE).

== History ==
The campus that the college occupies originally belonged to Windham College. After Windham shuttered in 1978, the campus remained unused. Plans for a prison and a conference center fell through. Putney Selectman Peter Shumlin persuaded the government to allow Landmark School in Beverly, Massachusetts, to start a college on the dormant campus. Landmark College was established in 1985.

Lynda Katz was appointed as the college's third president in 1994. Dr. Katz came in with goal of expanding and renovating the campus, implementing a faculty rank and promotion system as well as increased salaries, and pinning the college on the map as a contributor to the state.

The newly renovated Strauch Family Student Center was opened in 1997, which houses Student Affairs offices, Health & Counseling, the campus bookstore, student mail, the Fireside Cafe, and game room.

From 1999-2000, Landmark College received a Title III grant which improved the college's academic and residential programs, and a Title VII from the US Department of Education, which allowed Landmark College to share their expertise on learning disability and ADHD nationwide.

On May 17, 2001, the Chris Family Click Center (or "Click Center" for short) opened with expanded recreation and exercise facilities, including a climbing wall, replacing the original "bubble" that previously occupied the space.

In early 2004, the Landmark College Board of Trustees approved three capital projects, which included the East Academic Building (now Lewis Academic Building), Dining Hall (now Alumni Dining Hall), and the Bridges suite-style residences.

Following Katz's retirement in 2011, Peter A. Eden was named as the college's 4th president on July 1 the same year. Dr. Eden came in with a biotechnology and science background, which pushed for new degree programs in the sciences, including the first bachelor degree programs.

Landmark began offering its first bachelor degree in 2012, a Bachelor of Arts in Liberal Studies. Associates degrees in Computer Science and Life Science were also offered the same year.

The college built a $9.6 million, 28,500-square-foot (2,650 m^{2}) science and technology center named the MacFarlane Building in 2015. It was the first building erected since the college's founding.

In September 2016, Landmark College received a grant from the National Science Foundation of $650K. The Access to Innovative Education: STEM Opportunities for Students with Learning Disabilities (AIE-STEM) supports student scholar in its Computer Science and Life Science (now Biology) programs. Students in the program were offered scholarships up to $10,000, and receive mentoring and internship opportunities.

On July 13, 2024, Jim Dlugos was named as interim president after Peter Eden's departure. In 2025, Dlugos was named as the permanent president after a presidential search committee came to an agreement with him.

== Academics ==
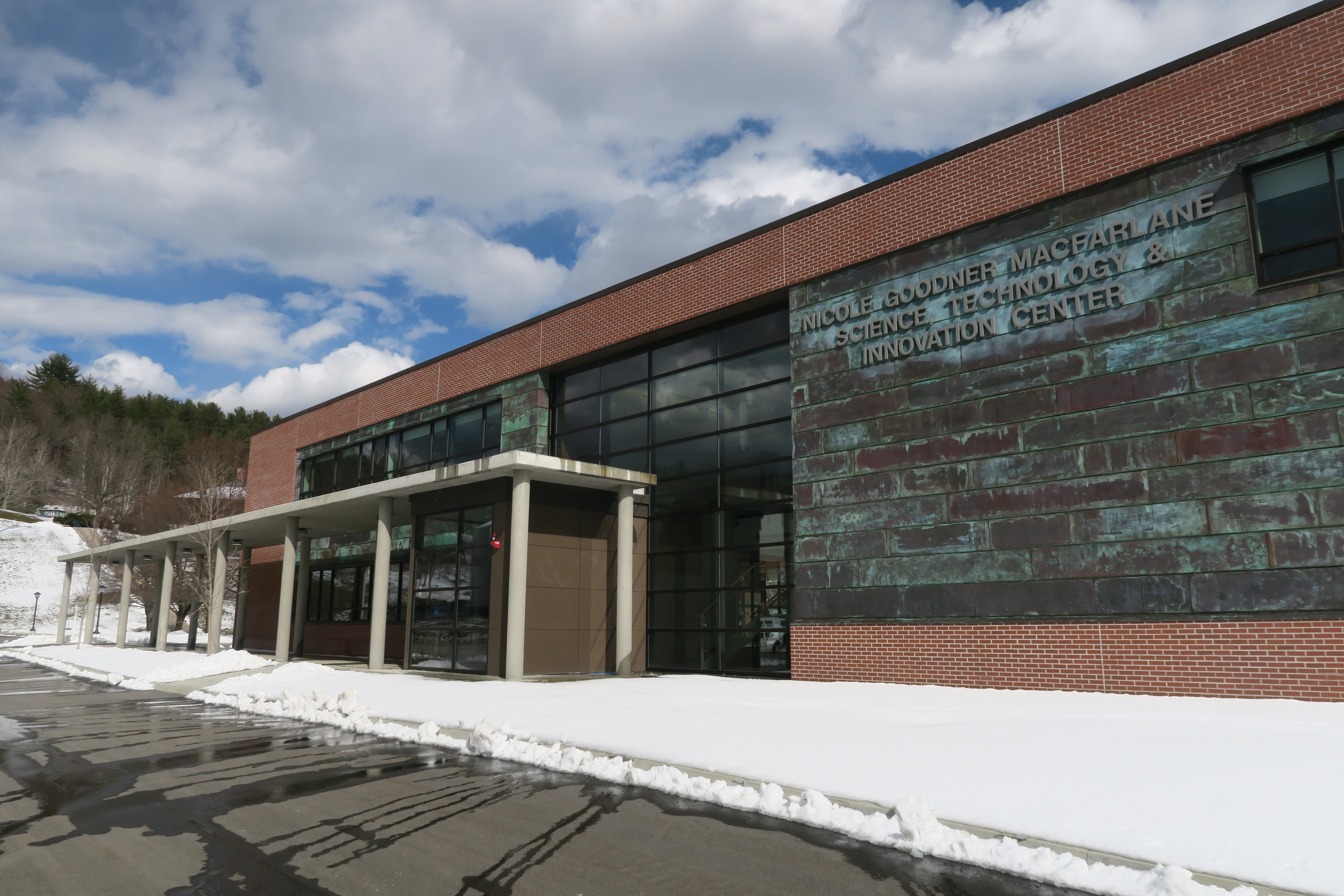
Nicole Goodner MacFarlane Science, Technology and Innovation Center

Applicants to the college are required to document average to above-average intelligence with the ability to complete college level work, along with a condition that impairs learning. Students are offered personal assistance in their studies, with a student-to-faculty ratio of 6:1, and a center for academic support employed with professional academic staff. Classroom faculty employ universal design principles and multi-modal teaching strategies.

The college offers associate degrees and, since 2012, has offered bachelor's degrees. Additionally, a post-baccalaureate certificate in Learning Differences and Neurodiversity aimed at education professionals was introduced in 2018.

High school students in several areas of Landmark's county, Windham, can access dual-enrollment NEASC-accredited courses. Middle school students can participate in a summer program called "Expanded Learning Opportunities in Science, Technology, Engineering and Mathematics."

In 2011, The New York Times reported that 30% of students in the associate program graduated within three years; many dropped out in their first or second semester.

=== High School Summer Program ===
The three-week-long High School Program is intended to assist high school students entering their junior or senior year. The program is designed to help students who may be struggling in school to learn about their learning styles, develop good habits and study skills, and serve as an introduction to college level academics. Students must be between 16–18 years old in order to be eligible for the program.

The program also has a Social Pragmatics track, where for an additional fee, students receive instruction in the PEERS curriculum for students struggling with making and keeping social connections. Students also have regular 1:1 sessions with a social coach.

== Costs ==
Tuition and fees for 2022–23 were $76,680, making it the 50th most expensive college, according to the National Center for Education Statistics. Tuition and fees for the 2015–2016 year were $51,330. In 2015, it topped CNN Money's list of the most expensive colleges. It was also the most expensive four-year private non-profit by list price according to the Department of Education's rankings for the 2012–2013 year; fees including room and board were reported to be $59,930 in 2013 and $61,910 in 2015. Scholarships of up to $30,000 are available.

== Student life ==
The average age is 20 years old, and about 97% of students live on campus. The male-to-female student ratio is about 3:1. Students are not required to have taken the SAT or ACT examinations. About half of Landmark's full-time students transferred from another college. Student turnover is high; there are now several bachelor's degrees offered, including Biology, Computer Science, Liberal Studies, Psychology, Integrated Arts, and Communications & Entrepreneurial Leadership (aka. COMEL) at the bachelors level. Associates Degree offerings include Business Studies, General Studies, Liberal Studies, Computer Science, and Biology.

== Athletics ==
The Landmark College Sharks field four sports spread across fall, winter, and spring seasons. Sharks athletics compete as independent programs not bound by NCAA, NAIA, or USCAA.

Sport	Season
Soccer (coed)	Fall (indoor in the spring)
Cross Country (coed)	Fall
Basketball (men's & women's)	Winter
Baseball	Spring

Soccer is a coed program that was first fielded in the fall of 1985 to coincide with the opening of the college. Its home facility was at the quad area of campus until 2017 when the new Charles Drake Field opened, named after the founder of the college. Landmark maintained a rivalry with Hampshire College throughout much of the team's history, which was referred to as the I-91 Connector Classic in the 1990s. Also in the 1990s, Landmark competed in the Crossroads Athletic Conference: a soccer league consisting of small colleges including Bennington College, Marlboro College, Simon's Rock at Bard College, School for International Training (S.I.T.) and Hampshire College. The Sharks won the league championship in 1995 and also achieved an undefeated season with 12 wins and 0 losses that season. Landmark College also offers indoor soccer in select years in the spring. The 2016 and 2017 squads won back to back league titles.

Men's basketball, like Soccer, began in the college's inaugural year in the fall of 1985. While basketball has competed as an independent program for most of its history, they have played in the Brattleboro Men's League, a company basketball league consisting of teams in the Brattleboro area and around Vermont, New Hampshire, and Massachusetts. They joined the league for their inaugural season in 1985–86 only, followed by another stint from 1996–97 to 2003–04. The Sharks won the Division 3 championship of the Men's League in 2000–01 The Sharks were also a basketball member of the Northern New England Small College Conference from the late-80s to the early-90s, finishing as Division B runner-up to Manchester Tech in 1988–89 as part of a 12–2 campaign. Prior to the opening of the present-day Sports Center in spring 2001, Landmark's basketball and volleyball teams played inside a plastic dome on campus that was constructed while the campus was home to Windham College. Landmark also played games at the nearby Gibson-Aiken Center in Brattleboro during their years in the Brattleboro Men's League

Former sports at Landmark include volleyball, equestrian, and softball. Volleyball was an inaugural sport, first competing as a coed team in 1985, followed by a men's team in 1986. Volleyball went dormant before returning in the late 1990s as a women's team for several seasons. Landmark equestrian first competed in 2003 in a competition at Mount Holyoke College. They returned in 2009 and competed until 2012. The team notably achieved a 4th place finish at a Mount Holyoke College show in November 2010.

== Facilities ==
Rooms are either doubles or singles. Residential halls are equipped with wireless Internet, laundry facilities, and common lounge space, as well as full-time residential staff. Some suite buildings have kitchens.

The four standard residence halls include Frost Hall, Alumni Hall (formerly Middle Hall), Stone Hall (formerly Hall 4), and Davis Hall, each can hold 55–75 students. Most students in their first year (and those who have not transferred from another college/university) will be placed in one of the four traditional buildings. Double-occupancy rooms make up a majority of the rooms in these buildings (with a handful of single-occupancy rooms)

Upperclass students can choose to live in premium housing options, including Aiken Hall, the Bridges, or Chumley. Bridges and Chumley offer suite/apartment style living with a common space, bathroom, and kitchenette for cooking including a stove, oven and microwave.

== Media ==
Media produced at the college include Impressions literary magazine, Voices Magazine student newspaper (formerly The Independent), WLMC Radio, and LC Voices.

WLMC Radio is the online streaming student-run radio station of Landmark College, broadcasting 24/7. The station has a regular cast of live DJs who are mostly students, but faculty and staff can also have shows. The station was founded in 2008 as part of a student initiative, and has been operating in the basement of the Strauch Family Student Center. WLMC Radio has won multiple awards from both the College Radio Foundation and the Intercollegiate Broadcasting System. Such awards include Spirit of College Radio, Best Streaming/Online Only Station Under 10K Students, Best Radio Drama, Best Public Service Announcement, and Best Spot News Interview.

== Notable alumni ==
- Quinn Bradlee, filmmaker, author, and disability advocate
- Dave Cole, visual artist and sculptor
- Ennis Cosby, only son of American comedian Bill Cosby
- Yishay Garbasz, interdisciplinary artist

=== Notable staff ===
- Alice B. Fogel, poet and writer; English professor
- Lesle Lewis, poet; English professor

== See also ==
- Beacon College
