= Paige Rense =

American magazine editor (1929–2021)

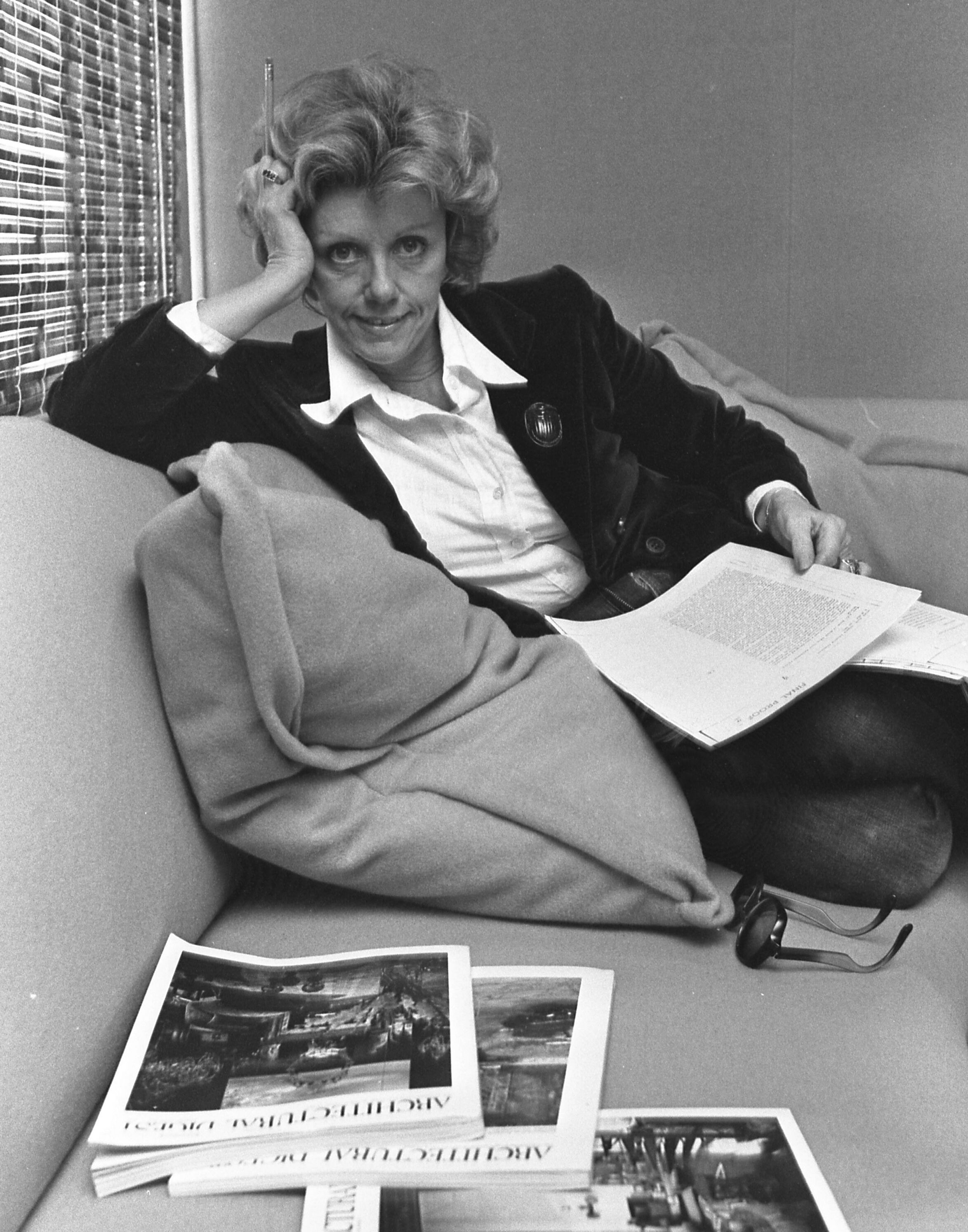
- Rense in her office in 1976
- Born: Patty Lou Pashong; May 4, 1929; Des Moines, Iowa, US
- Died: January 1, 2021 (aged 91)
- Occupations: Writer and editor
- Known for: Editor of Architectural Digest, 1975–2010
- Spouse(s): Richard F. Gardner (m.1950); David Thomas (m.?–1956); Arthur F. Rense (m.1958–1974 and 1987–1990); Kenneth Noland (m.1994–2010)

Paige Rense, also known as Paige Rense Noland (May 4, 1929 – January 1, 2021) was an American writer and editor who served as editor-in-chief of Architectural Digest magazine from 1975 until 2010. She founded the Arthur Rense Prize poetry award. Rense also transformed the cooking magazine Bon Appétit into its modern format, was editor-in-chief of GEO, and wrote a mystery novel, Manor House (Doubleday, 1997).

== Early life ==
Born on May 4, 1929 and adopted as an infant by Lloyd R. Pashong (1895–1988), a Des Moines, Iowa, public-school custodian, and his wife, the former Margaret May Smith (1890–1983), she was originally known as Patty Lou Pashong and took the name Paige as a teenager. By 1940, the family was living at 1014 Douglas Avenue in Des Moines, the residence of her maternal grandmother, Martha Smith; her father then was working as a spinner in a wool mill.

In the early 1940s she and her parents moved from Iowa, to Los Angeles, California. After running away from home at age 15 to escape her abusive father, she worked as an usherette in movie theaters.

== Career ==
A high-school dropout, Rense began her career in journalism in the mid-1950s, as a member of the editorial staff of the skin-diving magazine Water World, where her future husband Arthur F. Rense was the managing editor. After leaving Water World she wrote a how-to beauty book and a novel, in addition to articles for Cosmopolitan, and worked in publicity and advertising.

In October 1970 Rense became associate editor of Architectural Digest. Six months later she was named head of the magazine after the murder of its editor-in-chief, Bradley Little, and was appointed editor-in-chief in 1975. She held that position until 2010, having transformed the magazine, which was founded in 1920 as a trade journal, into "a bible for the design world and increasing its circulation to more than 850,000 from 50,000 during her tenure". As editor-in-chief, she focused the magazine on the work of architects, interior designers, and celebrity home highlights. She sought to hire well-known writers and award-winning photographers, eventually creating an international network and reach. When Conde Nast acquired the publication in 1993, a part of the deal was for Rense to remain editor-in-chief.

At the time of her retirement, she was reported to be working on a book about the career of her late husband Kenneth Noland, the color field artist.

Rense wrote Architectural Digest: Autobiography of a Magazine 1920–2010, in October 2018, which tells the story of Architectural Digest during her tenure as editor.

== Awards ==
Rense was the recipient of:

- The Museum of Arts & Design Achievement Award (2006)
- The American Academy of Achievement Award (2000)
- The Pratt Institute Founder Awards (1997)
- The Interior Design Hall of Fame Award (1985)

== Personal life ==
Rense was married four times over. Her first marriage was to Richard F. Gardner, a Los Angeles advertising executive. They married on August 25, 1950 and later divorced. She met David Thomas in the early 1950s while they were both working for the US Armed Forces Radio Service in Tokyo, Japan. They divorced in Baker, Florida, in 1956. By her third marriage to Arthur F. Rense (1916–1990), a sports journalist for the Los Angeles Daily News and the director of public relations for Howard Hughes's Summa Corporation, she had three stepsons. The couple were married twice, from February 22, 1958, until their divorce in March 1974 and from December 22, 1987, until Arthur Rense's death in 1990. In 1998, Rense established the triennial Arthur Rense Prize in poetry in honor of her late husband, an amateur poet; it is given by the American Academy of Arts and Letters. In 1994, she married color field painter Kenneth Noland (1924–2010), and she had four stepchildren.

Rense died on January 1, 2021, of heart disease.
