= Arthur Rense =

American sports journalist (1917–1990)

Arthur F. Rense
- Born: 1917
- Died: 1990 (aged 72–73)
- Occupation: Sports journalist
- Known for: Director of PR for Summa Corporation (Howard Hughes)

Arthur F. Rense (1917 – 1990) was a sports journalist for the Los Angeles Daily News and the director of public relations for Howard R. Hughes' Summa Corporation.

== Biography ==
Arthur Frederick Rense was born 20 May 1917 in Cleveland, Ohio, to Austrian-Italian immigrant parents, Joseph Rensi and his wife, the former Rosalia Luther. He had six siblings, including five brothers: Louis, Rudolph, Andrew, Frank, William; and a sister, Rose. After graduating from Ohio State University with a degree in English, Rense served in the United States Coast Guard during World War II.

== Career ==
Rense moved to Los Angeles after World War II and joined the original Los Angeles Daily News, one of four downtown Los Angeles newspapers (calling itself "the only Democratic newspaper west of the Rockies") as a sportswriter. He covered all sports, from young UCLA basketball coach John Wooden's Bruins to the then-new Los Angeles Rams football team, including their 1951 world championship. In 1954, after the Daily News folded, he joined United Press as a reporter, and in 1957 published and edited a magazine group that included "The Art Rense Sports Book: Professional Football", the first magazine devoted exclusively to professional football.

Between 1959 and 1974 Rense handled public relations for the Douglas Aircraft Company, Missiles and Space division (pre-McDonnell-Douglas). In the mid-1970s Rense became public relations specialist for Harvey Mudd College, and later collaborated with football player Tom Harmon on Tom Harmon's Football Today in Las Vegas. After that, Rense worked on public relations for hotels in Las Vegas owned by the Summa Corporation, mainly the Desert Inn. He was a lifelong poet by avocation.

== Marriages ==
Rense was married three times:

- (Mary, last name unknown), of Cleveland, Ohio.
- Madelon Shearer. The couple had three sons, Kirk, Jeff, and Rip.
- Patricia Pashong, whom he married twice, firstly in 1957 (divorced March 1974) and secondly on 22 December 1987. She became known as Paige Rense, editor-in-chief of Architectural Digest magazine.

== Death ==
Arthur F. Rense died of leukemia at the age of 74 on 28 December 1990 in Las Vegas, Nevada.

== Arthur Rense Prize ==
In 1998, Rense's widow, Paige, established the Arthur Rense Prize in poetry, presented by the American Academy of Arts and Letters. The award, given triennially, provides $20,000 to an exceptional poet.

=== Winners ===
- 1999 — James McMichael
- 2002 — B.H. Fairchild
- 2005 — Daniel Hoffman
- 2008 — Hayden Carruth
- 2011 — David Wagoner
- 2014 — Ellen Bryant Voigt
- 2017 — August Kleinzahler
- 2020 — Mary Ruefle
- 2023 — Shane McCrae
