= Lillian Halegua =

American writer

Lillian Halegua (also known by the pseudonym Lillian Hale) was an American writer. Her first published work appeared in 1958, a short story titled "We Are All Animals" in the journal Prairie Schooner. In 1959, her debut novel The Pearl Bastard was released under the pseudonym Lillian Hale by the publisher George Braziller. It was received positively by critics, the New York Times Book Review calling the book "a searing, stunning experience". The Pearl Bastard proved to be her most successful book, and was reprinted several times in the following decades. It was published in Spanish translation in 1990.

Halegua wrote a few more books, among them the 1970 novel The Hanging, which was also translated into Spanish. She retrained as a librarian, and her literary career eventually tapered away.
