= Carol Potter (poet) =

American poet and professor

- Education: University of Massachusetts Amherst
- Occupations: Poet, Professor
- Writing career
- Notable work: Some Slow Bees

Carol Potter is an American poet and professor known for writing the book Some Slow Bees. She currently teaches at Antioch University.

== Early life and education ==
Potter was born and raised in northwestern Connecticut. She earned her B.A. in English/Journalism, Women's Studies from the University of Massachusetts Amherst and her MFA from the MFA Program for Poets & Writers there, as well as her Certificate in Women's Studies.

== Career ==
She is the 2014 winner of the FIELD Poetry Prize from Oberlin College Press for her book, Some Slow Bees. Her previous collection of poems is Otherwise Obedient (Red Hen Press, 2007), which was a 2008 Lambda Literary Award finalist. Her poems have appeared in literary journals and magazines including Poetry Magazine, FIELD, The Massachusetts Review, The American Poetry Review, Iowa Review, Women's Review of Books, Prairie Schooner, Maize, The Journal, and Arts & Letters, and in anthologies, including Pushcart XXVI. She won the 2004 dA Center for the Arts Poetry Award and has received residency and fellowship grants from MacDowell Colony, Yaddo, Fundacion Valparaiso, Villa Montalvo, Centrum, and the Millay Colony for the Arts. She was also Writer-in-Residence at Thurber House in 2003, and Visiting Poet at the Indiana University MFA Program (2003–2004).

Potter taught for 17 years at Holyoke Community College, currently teaches in the MFA program at Antioch University in Los Angeles, as well as at the Community College of Vermont in Newport, and lives in Vermont's Northeast Kingdom.

== Published works ==
- Before We Were Born (Alice James Books, 1990)
- Upside Down in the Dark (Alice James Books, 1995)
- Short History of Pets (Cleveland State University Poetry Center, 2000)
- Otherwise Obedient (Red Hen Press, 2007)
- Some Slow Bees (Oberlin College Press, 2015)

== Awards and honors ==
- 1986: Tom McAfee Discovery Award from The Missouri Review
- 1990: New Letters Award for Poetry
- 1999: The Balcones Poetry Prize from Austin Community College
- 1999: Cleveland State University Poetry Center Award
- 2001: Pushcart Prize
- 2001: The Balcones Poetry Prize from Austin Community College
- 2004: dA Center for the Arts Poetry Award
- 2008: Lambda Literary Award finalist
- 2014: FIELD Poetry Prize from Oberlin College Press
- 2015: Ekphrasis Prize for Poetry
