= Liz Waldner =

American poet

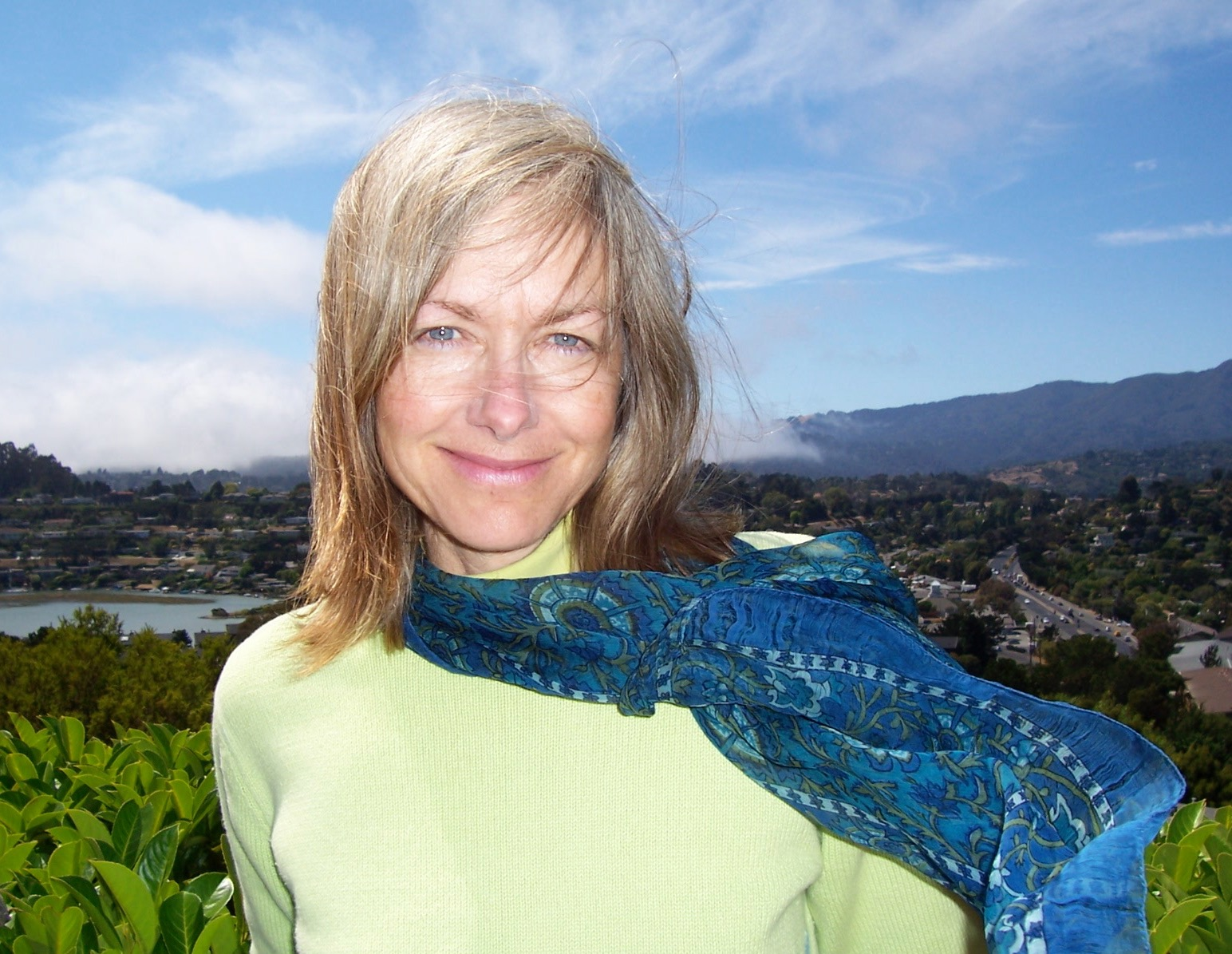
- Born: Cleveland, Ohio
- Occupation: Writer
- Writing career
- Genres: poetry non-fiction fiction
- Notable work: Homing Devices

Liz Waldner is an American poet.

== Life ==
Waldner was raised in small town Mississippi. At 28, she received a B.A. in philosophy and mathematics from St. John's College; she later studied at the Summer Language School in French Middlebury College, and received an M.F.A. from the Iowa Writers' Workshop. Waldner was a Regents Fellow in the Communication Department at the University of California, San Diego.

She is the author of eight poetry collections, most recently Play (Lightful Press) and Trust (winner of the Cleveland State University Poetry Center Open Competition). Her collection, Dark Would (the missing person) (University of Georgia Press), was the winner of the 2002 Contemporary Poetry Series; her collection, Self and Simulacra (2001), won the Beatrice Hawley Award; and her collection, A Point Is That Which Has No Part (2000), received the 1999 Iowa Poetry Prize and the 2000 James Laughlin Award from the Academy of American Poets.

Other honors include grants from the Washington State Professional Development Grant for Artists, Massachusetts Cultural Council Artist Fellowship, the Boomerang Foundation, the Gertrude Stein Award for Innovative Poetry and the Barbara Deming Money for Women Grant. She received fellowships from the Vermont Studio Center, the Djerassi Foundation, Centrum, Hedgebrook, Virginia Center for the Creative Arts, Villa Montalvo, Fundación Valparaiso and the MacDowell Colony.

Waldner's poem "The Ballad of Barding Gaol", along with a selection of others, won the Poetry Society of America's Robert M. Winner Memorial Award, and her poetry has appeared in literary journals and magazines such as Ploughshares, Poetry, The New Yorker, The American Poetry Review, The Journal, Parnassus West, The Cortland Review, Electronic Poetry Review, Colorado Review, Denver Quarterly, New American Writing, Indiana Review, Abacus, and VOLT.

She was an adjunct at Millsaps College in Jackson MS (1988–90) where she used the "Eyes On The Prize" PBS series as a text in her freshman comp course, inviting the college community to regard it as an all-college text; sponsored and served as panelist on the first Environmental Symposium; began with her students a campus recycling program; was advisor for the Rape Awareness office; co-led an NIH symposium on Suffering and Tragedy, gave a paper at the Philosophy Department's Colloquium, and attempted to live on $1000 a course.

Her other teaching positions included Lecturer at Tufts University, the Institute for Language and Thinking at Bard College, Cornell College, Hugo House (Seattle), and the College of Wooster.

== Other Awards ==
- 2017: Foundation for Contemporary Arts Dorothea Tanning Award
- 2004: Northern California Book Awards
- 2001: Beatrice Hawley Award
- 2000: James Laughlin Award

== Published works ==
=== Full-length poetry collections ===
- Waldner, Liz (2016). Her Faithfulness. Miami University Press. ISBN 978-1-881163-58-9.
- Waldner, Liz (2016). Little House, Big House (Now How I Am An American). Noemi Press. ISBN 978-1-934819-56-2.
- Waldner, Liz (2009). Play. Lightful Press. ISBN 978-0-9822471-0-5.
- Waldner, Liz (March 2, 2009). Trust. Cleveland State University. ISBN 978-1-880834-84-8.
- Waldner, Liz (2004). Saving the Appearances. Ahsahta Press. ISBN 978-0-916272-79-1.
- Waldner, Liz (2001). Self and Simulacra. Alice James Books. ISBN 978-1-882295-32-6.
- Waldner, Liz (2002). Dark Would (the missing person). University of Georgia Press. ISBN 978-0-8203-2391-6.
- Waldner, Liz (2002). Etym(bi)ology. Omnidawn Press. ISBN 978-1-890650-10-0.
- Waldner, Liz (2000). A Point Is That Which Has No Part. University of Iowa Press. ISBN 978-0-87745-702-2.
- Waldner, Liz (1997). Homing Devices. O Books. ISBN 978-1-882022-31-1.

=== Chapbooks ===
- Waldner, Liz (2000). Call. Meow Press.
- Waldner, Liz (2000). With the Tongues of Angels. Owl Creek Press. ISBN 978-0-937669-64-8.
- Waldner, Liz (2002). Representation. Quale Press. ISBN 978-0-9700663-4-3.
- Waldner, Liz (2000). Read Only Memory. Seeing Eye Press.
- Waldner, Liz (1996). Memo (la)mento. Texture Press.

=== Works published in periodicals ===
- "semblance, screens". Poetry. Sep 2009.
- "inchant, penchant". Parnassus West. 2009.
- "A Calculus of Readiness". poets.org.
- "Es/chew". poets.org.
- "Where, Broken (the darkness". poets.org.
- "Witness". poets.org.
- "The Sovereignty and the Goodness of God, Together with the Faithfulness of His Promises Displayed". The New Yorker. January 5, 2009.
- "Adjunct". The Journal. 2008.
- "Photo (Op/tative) Synthesis". Poetry. May 2008.
- "Seattle, Third and Pike". Boston Review. April–May 2003.
- "Can the Regime of Meaning Be An Extension of the Regime of Truth?". The Cortland Review. 17. August 2001.
- "Projector: A lover's Lament; Twin Hymns" (PDF). Antennae. 2001. Archived from the original (PDF) on 2008-11-23.

=== Ploughshares ===
- "The Imagined Snake Is the Sport of the Rope". Ploughshares. Winter 2002–2003. Archived from the original on October 11, 2007.
- "Off Course: Ineffable". Ploughshares. Spring 2001. Archived from the original on September 3, 2007.
- "Determinate Inflorescence: Ephemera". Ploughshares. Spring 2001. Archived from the original on June 4, 2006.
- "Homeseeker's Paradise". Ploughshares. Spring 2001. Archived from the original on August 22, 2007.
