= Amy Woolard =

American lawyer and poet

Amy Woolard is an American attorney and poet. She won the 2018 Alice James Prize. She won the 2015 1/2 K Prize,

She is Chief Program Officer for the ACLU of Virginia. She is an advocate for criminal justice reform in Virginia.

== Early life ==
She graduated from the University of Virginia, where she studied with Gregory Orr in the University of Virginia School of Law.

== Career ==
Her work appeared in Virginia Quarterly Review, The Rumpus, Guernica, Ploughshares, Gulf Coast, Colorado Review, Fence, Slate, The New Yorker, and The Paris Review.

== Works ==
- Woolard, Amy (2020). Neck of the woods. Farmington, Maine. ISBN 978-1-948579-07-0. OCLC 1119475018.
