= Jean Pedrick =

Jean Pedrick Kefferstan (August 5, 1922 – July 31, 2006) was an American author, poet, editor and publisher.

Pedrick published her first book, the novel The Fascination in 1947 and published four books of poetry and nine chapbooks during her career. Pedrick co-founded the Alice James Poetry Cooperative (later Alice James Books). Pedrick also published poems in The Atlantic Monthly, The New Yorker, Yankee, The Paris Review, and other magazines.

== Early life and education ==
Pedrick was born in Salem, Massachusetts to Laurence Davis (a businessman) and Elfrieda (Virchow) Pedrick. She attended Wheaton College, graduating with a B.A. in 1943.

== Legacy ==
The New England Poetry Club has named a yearly award, the Jean Pedrick Chapbook Prize, in her honor, "for a chapbook of poems published in the last two years."
