= Pamela Gemin =

American poet

Pamela Gemin (born April 20, 1954) is an author and editor. She is also Professor Emerita of English at the University of Wisconsin–Oshkosh.

== Works ==
Pamela Gemin is the author of Vendettas, Charms, and Prayers (1999, New Rivers Press), which was a Minnesota Voices Project winner. She is also the editor of University of Iowa Press' Boomer Girls (1999, with Paula Sergi), Are You Experienced? (2003), and Sweeping Beauty (2005). Her new collection of poems, Another Creature, was a finalist for the Miller Williams Poetry Prize and will be published by University of Arkansas Press in 2010.

Gemin has published poems in such journals as Green Mountains Review and Prairie Schooner, and her poetry and anthologies have been featured on National Public Radio's All Things Considered and Morning Edition, as well as Garrison Keillor's Writers' Almanac.

== Honors ==
She received a 2005 Wisconsin Arts Board Awards Fellowship in Literary Arts from the Wisconsin Arts Board for her poetry.

She was awarded the D.H. Lawrence Fellowship from the University of New Mexico in 2001, and was a writer-in-residence at the Chautauqua Institution in 2005 and 2009.
