= Shane McCrae =

American poet (born 1975)

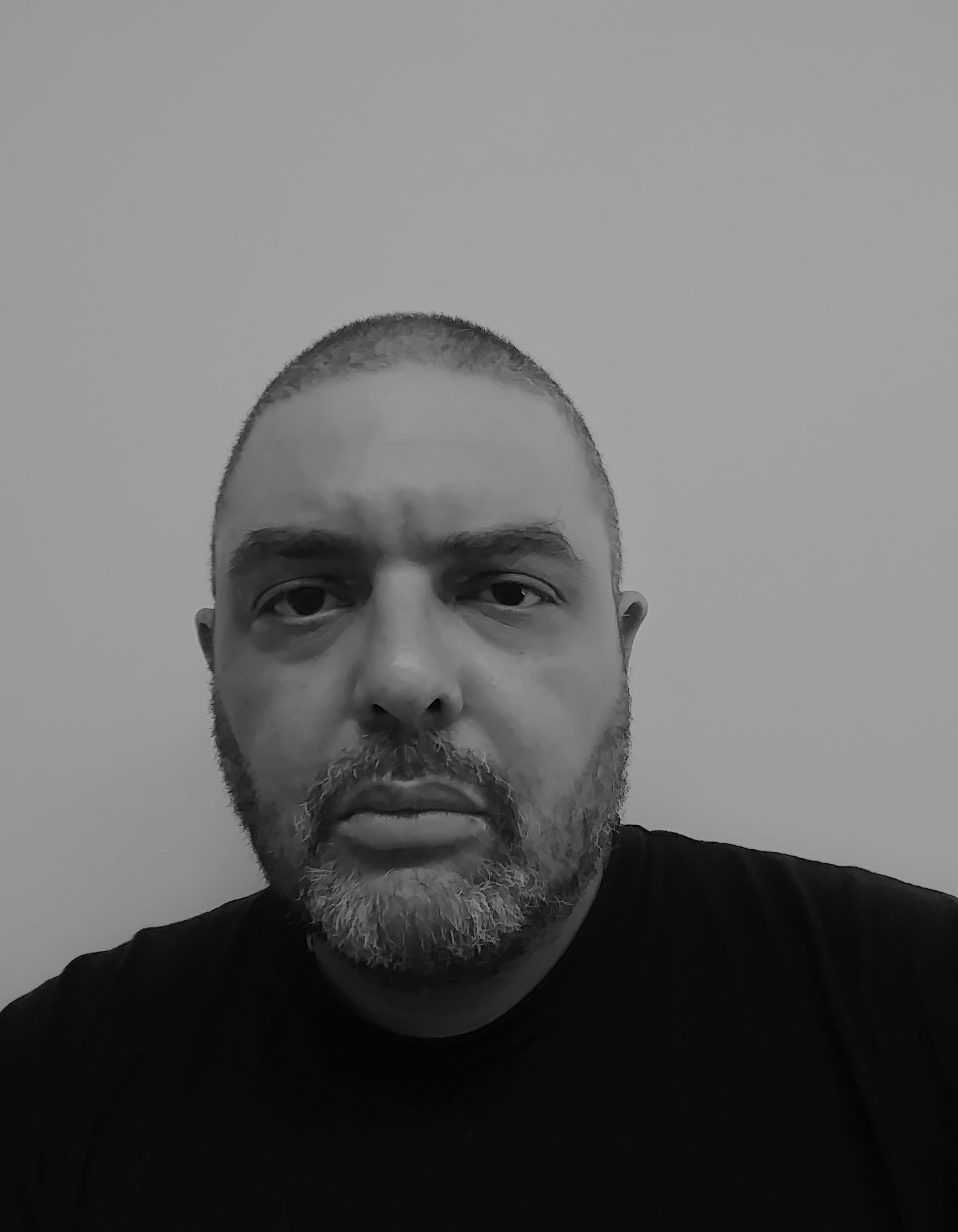
Shane McCrae

Shane McCrae (born September 22, 1975, in Portland, Oregon) is an American poet who is also the poetry editor of the journal Image and an associate professor at the Columbia University School of the Arts.

McCrae was the recipient of a 2011 Whiting Award, and in 2012 his collection Mule was a finalist for the Kate Tufts Discovery Award and a PEN Center USA Literary Award. In 2013, McCrae received a fellowship from the National Endowment for the Arts. He received a Lannan Literary Award in 2017, in 2018 his collection In the Language of My Captor won an Anisfield-Wolf Book Award, and in 2019 he was awarded a Guggenheim Fellowship.

His poems have appeared in numerous journals and anthologies, including Best American Poetry, American Poetry Review, African American Review, Fence, and AGNI.

== Early life and education ==
Born in Portland, Oregon to a white mother and black father, he was kidnapped by his maternal grandparents when he was three years old who raised him to believe that his father had abandoned him. His grandfather was a white supremacist who abused him. He moved to California with his grandparents when he was 10 years old, but he grew up there and in Texas. He did not see his father again until he was 16.

He dropped out of high school, had a child at 18, and later earned a GED. He attended Chemeketa Community College but graduated with a B.A. in 2002 from Linfield College in McMinnville, Oregon. He has earned three graduate degrees: an M.F.A. from the University of Iowa in Iowa City (2004), a J.D. from Harvard Law School (2007), and an M.A. from the University of Iowa (2012).

== Career ==
McCrae was an assistant professor in the Creative Writing program at Oberlin College from 2015 to 2017 and is an associate professor in the Creative Writing MFA program at Columbia University.

He is the author of the poetry collections Mule (Cleveland State University Poetry Center, 2011), Blood (Noemi Press, 2013), Forgiveness Forgiveness (Factory Hollow Press, 2014), The Animal Too Big to Kill (Persea Books, 2015), In the Language of My Captor (Wesleyan University Press, 2017), The Gilded Auction Block (Farrar, Straus and Giroux, 2019), Sometimes I Never Suffered (Farrar, Straus and Giroux, 2020) Cain Named the Animal (Farrar, Straus and Giroux, 2022), and Pulling the Chariot of the Sun: A Memoir of a Kidnapping (Scribner, 2023).

=== Awards ===
In 2011, McCrae received the Whiting Award, and in 2012 his collection Mule was a finalist for the Kate Tufts Discovery Award and a PEN Center USA Literary Award.

The Animal Too Big to Kill won the 2014 Lexi Rudnitsky/Editor's Choice Award.

In the Language of My Captor was a finalist for the 2017 National Book Award and a winner of the 2018 Anisfield-Wolf Book Awards.

McCrae received a Lannan Literary Award in 2018, and a Guggenheim Fellowship in 2019.

Sometimes I Never Suffered was shortlisted for the 2020 T. S. Eliot Prize.

In 2020, McCrae received a NYSCA/NYFA Artist Fellowship.

In 2023, McCrae received the Arthur Rense Prize, an award given only every three years for a poet's "exceptional" body of work.

== Works ==
- In Canaan, Milwaukee: Rescue Press, 2010. ISBN 9780984488919, OCLC 707718211
- Mule, Cleveland: Cleveland State University Poetry Center, 2011. ISBN 9781880834930, OCLC 732166609
- Blood, Noemi Press, 2013. ISBN 9781934819302, OCLC 931029174
- Nonfiction, Pittsburgh, PA: Black Lawrence Press, 2014. ISBN 9781937854980, OCLC 833301672
- Forgiveness Forgiveness, Hadley, MA: Factory Hollow Press, 2014. ISBN 9780983520313, OCLC 890624391
- The Animal Too Big to Kill, New York: Persea Books, 2015. ISBN 9780892554645, OCLC 913514526
- In the Language of My Captor Middletown, Connecticut: Wesleyan University Press, 2017. ISBN 9780819577115, OCLC 1018464460
- The Gilded Auction Block, New York: Farrar, Straus and Giroux, 2019. ISBN 9780374162252, OCLC 1035365132
- Sometimes I Never Suffered, New York: Farrar, Straus and Giroux, 2020. ISBN 9780374240813, OCLC 1182576051
- Cain Named the Animal, New York: Farrar, Straus and Giroux, 2022. ISBN 9780374602857, OCLC 1246143402
- Pulling the Chariot of the Sun: A Memoir of a Kidnapping, New York: Scribner, 2023. ISBN 9781668021743, OCLC 1390879054
- The Many Hundreds of the Scent: Poems, New York: Farrar, Straus and Giroux, 2023. ISBN 9780374607197, OCLC 1344332594
