= BkMk Press =

- Parent company: Independent, non-profit.
- Founded: 1971
- Country of origin: United States
- Headquarters location: Kansas City, Missouri
- Distribution: Small Press Distribution
- Publication types: Books
- Nonfiction topics: poetry, prose
- Fiction genres: literary press

BkMk Press is an independent literary press formerly affiliated with the University of Missouri-Kansas City, that publishes full-length collections of poetry, fiction, and essays. Founded in 1971 by Dan Jaffe, it had been a part of UMKC's College of Arts and Sciences since 1983. In July 2021 the university separated BkMk Press and BkMk became an independent entity. The press has received funding and awards from the National Endowment for the Arts, the Missouri Arts Council, the Swedish Institute in Stockholm, the Witter Bynner Foundation, and the Kansas City Institute for Trusts and Foundations.

Notable authors published by BkMk Press include Mmbembe Milton Smith, Yehuda Amichai, Howard Schwartz, Alfred Kisubi, George Gurly, Sylvia Wheeler and others. Recent publications by Kelly Cherry, Alice Friman, Rane Arroyo, Carolyn Kizer, Tony Barnstone, and Mary Troy.

BkMk Press publishes on average six titles a year, and sponsors two annual publication awards for the best submitted book-length manuscript in English: the John Ciardi Prize for Poetry, and the G.S. Sharat Chandra Prize for Short Fiction.
