= R. A. Villanueva =

Filipino American poet

- Born: 20th century New Jersey, U.S.
- Education: Rutgers University; New York University
- Occupation: Writer
- Writing career
- Language: English
- Genre: Poetry
- Notable awards: Prairie Schooner Book Prize (2013)
- Website: caesura.nu

R. A. Villanueva is a Filipino American poet. His debut collection, Reliquaria, won the 2013 Prairie Schooner Book Prize. He is a founding editor of Tongue: A Journal of Writing & Art.

== Early life and education ==
Villanueva was born in New Jersey, United States, and graduated from Rutgers University, located in New Brunswick, New Jersey. He holds an MFA degree from New York University.

== Career ==
Villanueva's writing has appeared online at Guernica, Prac Crit, and McSweeney's Internet Tendency, as well as in print publications such as Poetry, the American Poetry Review, AGNI, Gulf Coast, Virginia Quarterly Review, Bellevue Literary Review, Ambit, and DIAGRAM. His work has also been featured by the Academy of American Poets and on BBC Radio London. Villanueva's poem, "Life Drawing", was the focus of the December 4, 2020, episode of the podcast Poetry Unbound.

== Awards ==
His honors include commendations from the Forward Prizes and the 2013 Ninth Letter Literary Award for Poetry, and fellowships from Kundiman, The Constance Saltonstall Foundation for the Arts, and the Asian American Literary Review.

== Works ==
- Reliquaria. University of Nebraska Press. 2014. ISBN 978-0-8032-7652-9.

== See also ==
- List of poets from the United States
- List of Rutgers University people
