= Christopher Kempf =

American writer and scholar (born 1985)

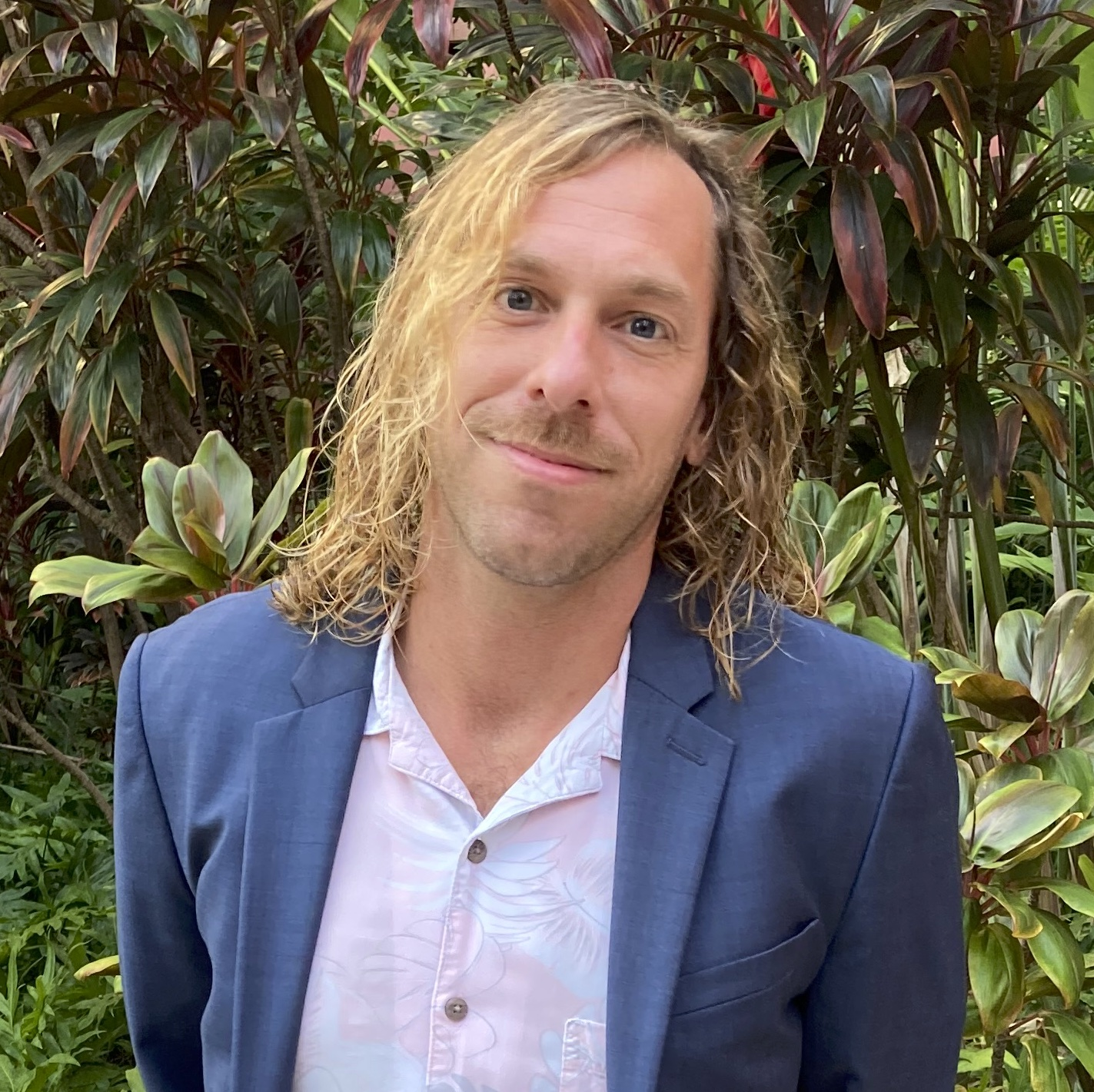
- Born: 1985 (age 40–41); Marion, Ohio, USA
- Education: John Carroll University (BA, 2007); Cornell University (MFA, 2009); Stanford University (Stegner Fellowship, 2014); University of Chicago (PhD, 2020)
- Occupations: Assistant Professor, University of Illinois
- Notable work: Late in the Empire of Men, What Though the Field Be Lost, Craft Class: The Writing Workshop in American Culture

Christopher Kempf (born 1985) is an American poet, essayist, and scholar of American literature.

== Education ==
Kempf holds a BA in English from John Carroll University, an MFA in Poetry from Cornell University, a Ph.D. in English Language and Literature from the University of Chicago, and was a 2012–2014 Wallace Stegner Fellow in Poetry at Stanford University. His honors include a Pushcart Prize, a National Endowment for the Arts Fellowship, and a National Parks Arts Foundation residency.

== Career ==
Kempf is the author of the scholarly book Craft Class: The Writing Workshop in American Culture (Johns Hopkins, 2022) and two poetry collections: Late in the Empire of Men (Four Way, 2017) and What Though the Field Be Lost (LSU, 2021). He has published creative nonfiction in Indiana Review, Meridian, and Narrative, among other places. Additionally, his creative nonfiction has been long-listed in Best American Essays and Best American Sports Writing.

A former Emerging Writer Lecturer at Gettysburg College, Kempf teaches in the MFA program at the University of Illinois.

== Published books ==
=== Poetry ===
- Late in the Empire of Men (Four Way, 2017)
- What Though the Field Be Lost] (LSU, 2021)

=== Scholarship ===
- Craft Class: The Writing Workshop in American Culture] (Johns Hopkins, 2022)

== Selected honors and awards ==
- Guggenheim Fellowship in Poetry (2026)
- Illinois Arts Council 2023 Individual Artist Fellowship
- Narrative Summer 2020 Story/Essay Contest, First Place (for essay Local Color)
- The Best American Poetry (2020) (for poem "After,")
- National Parks Arts Foundation Residency (2018)
- Pushcart Prize (2017)
- National Endowment for the Arts Fellowship (2015)
- Wallace Stegner Fellowship in Poetry, Stanford University (2012–2014)

== Critical acclaim ==
=== Late in the Empire of Men ===
In The New York Times, Stephanie Burt celebrated how, in Late in the Empire of Men "long sentences and interwoven plots contrast the poet's confined early life in blue-collar Ohio with the measure of freedom he found on the West Coast," heralding the book's critique of "American, and Midwestern, bad faith." In Kenyon Review, Brian Tierney found the collection "timely insight for our annus horribilis." "[S]wagger, dark wit, erotic melancholy, syntactic dexterity, and many laudable skills are on display in Empire," Tierney writes, "which successfully contribute to its tonal and thematic universe." In Colorado Review, Benjamin Voigt noted a "particular gift for vulnerability." The poem "Clearing the History," Voigt contended, "does the important cultural work of exploring how digital pornography impacts male sexuality, but beneath its referential pyrotechnics, it's essentially a poem about shame and desire."

=== What Though the Field Be Lost ===
In Los Angeles Review of Books (LARB), Lisa Russ Spaar writes, of What Though the Field Be Lost, that "what Kempf does ...feels original and important." In our "identity-facing moment," Spaar argues, "Kempf steps with smarts, humor, a depth and breadth of historical knowledge, and a nimble imagination into the thick of the debate about the meaning of America, avoiding rancor, rage, or oversimplification." In Colorado Review, Katherine Indermaur likewise finds in the collection "precisely the kind of honesty missing from contemporary political discourse." Evan Goldstein, writing in The Adroit Journal, calls the book an "incisive look...at the social tensions and unanswered historical questions in America." And in The Civil War Monitor, Kent Gramm writes that "Kempf has written an excellent series of reflections," describing poems that are "cerebral, dense with literary and historical allusions, and riddled with ambiguity and irony."
