= Alice James Books =

American non-profit poetry press located in Farmington, Maine

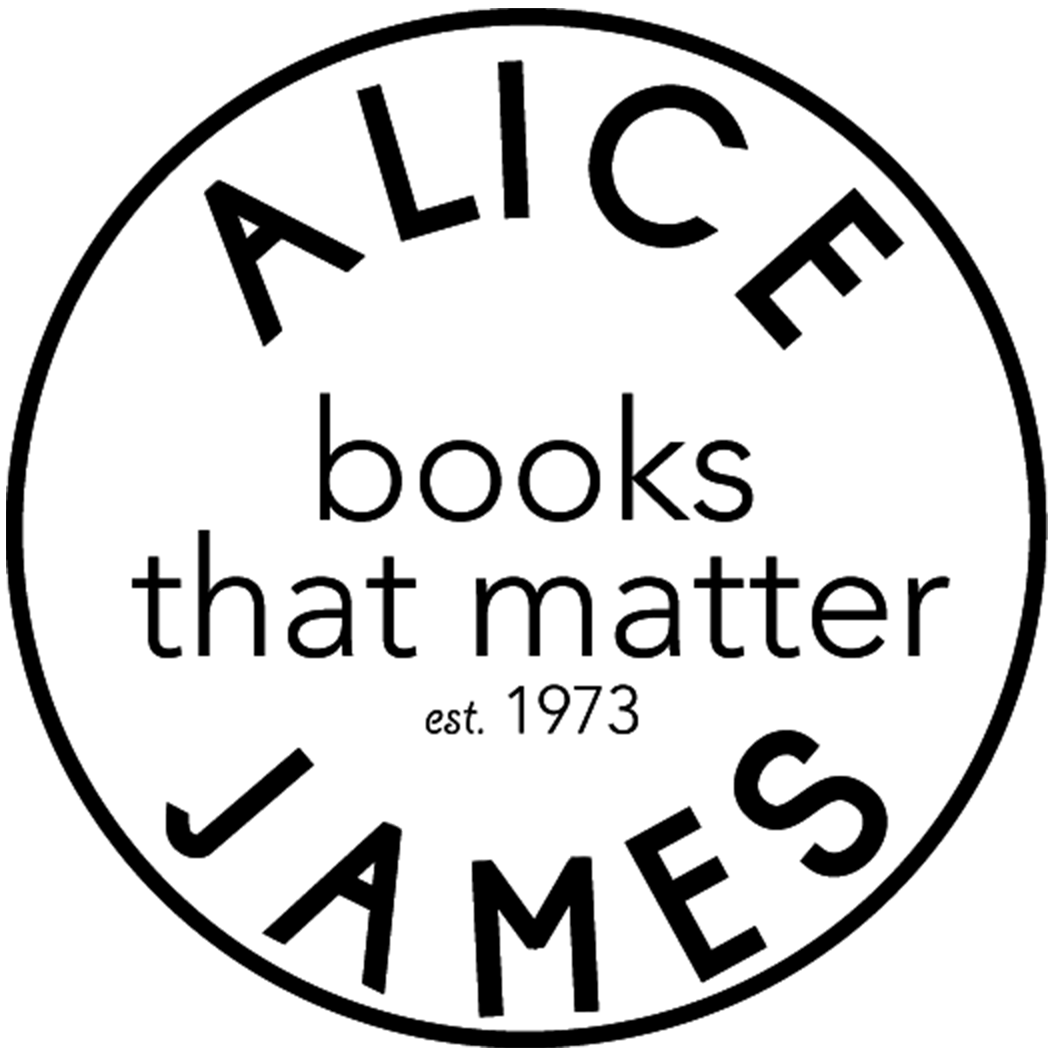
- Founded: 1973
- Founder: Patricia Cumming, Marjorie Fletcher, Lee Rudolph, Ron Schreiber, Betsy Sholl, Cornelia Veenendaal, and Jean Pedrick
- Country of origin: United States
- Headquarters location: New Gloucester, Maine
- Distribution: Consortium Book Sales & Distribution
- Publication types: Books
- Official website: alicejamesbooks.org

Alice James Books is an American non-profit poetry press located in New Gloucester, Maine.

== History and mission ==
"Alice James Books was founded as a co-operative press in Cambridge, MA in 1973 by five women and two men: Patricia Cumming, Marjorie Fletcher, Lee Rudolph, Ron Schreiber, Betsy Sholl, Cornelia Veenendaal, and Jean Pedrick. The intent of this company was to provide women with a greater representation in literature and involve the writer in the publishing process. In the 1970s women writers had a very difficult time being published. Recognizing this dire need, Alice James Books was established." Maine Poet Laureate Betsy Sholl shared her memory of being a founding member of the press in an interview: "The experience of starting the press from the ground up, she says, was a heady one, not least because the organization put a special emphasis on publishing poetry written by women. 'There really were attitudes that made it hard for women to publish,' Sholl says. 'There weren't a lot of women being published, and male editors tended to be pretty disdainful.' " The press is named for Alice James (sister of novelist Henry James and philosopher William James), whose fine journal and gift for writing were unrecognized within her lifetime. The mission of Alice James Books, a cooperative poetry press, is to seek out and publish the best contemporary poetry by both established and beginning poets, with particular emphasis on involving poets in the publishing process.

== Notable authors and honors ==
Notable poets published by Alice James Books include Franny Choi, Taylor Johnson, Sumita Chakraborty, Kevin Goodan, Alessandra Lynch, Andres Cerpa, Cynthia Cruz, Jane Kenyon, Donald Revell, Jean Valentine, David Kirby, Cole Swensen, Brian Turner, Kaveh Akbar, Robin Becker, Frank X. Gaspar, Mary Szybist, Forrest Hamer, Sarah Manguso, Kazim Ali, Ellen Doré Watson, Fanny Howe, B.H. Fairchild and Matthea Harvey.

Authors have been recipients of Lannan Literary Awards, the Witter Bynner Award, Amy Lowell Poetry Travelling Scholarship, American Book Award, Kingsley Tufts Poetry Award, the Norma Farber First Book Award, the Arthur Rense Poetry Prize, the Lenore Marshall Poetry Prize, the William Carlos Williams Award, The Nation/Discovery Prize, The Rona Jaffe Foundation Award, Whiting Writer's Award, Guggenheim Fellowships, NEA fellowships, and many other honors. B.H. Fairchild's The Art of the Lathe (1998) and Cole Swensen's Goest (2004) were National Book Award finalists.

Alice James Books authors have been interviewed on PBS NewsHour, National Public Radio, BBC Radio, and profiled in print media including The New York Times, The Paris Review, and many other publications.

Alice James Books titles have been reviewed in The New York Times Sunday Book Review, The New Yorker, ALA Booklist, Publishers Weekly, Library Journal, Boston Globe, Los Angeles Times, and many other publications. Alice James Books itself has been featured in such magazines as Ms, Poets & Writers, Publishers Weekly, Slate, and Poetry Daily.

The press received the 2021 Golden Colophon Award for Paradigm Independent Publishing from the Community of Literary Magazines and Presses.

== Manuscript selection and awards ==
"The cooperative selects manuscripts for publication through its national, annual award, the Alice James Award, previously known as the Beatrice Hawley Award. The press previously offered the Kinereth Gensler Awards, a regional, annual competition open to residents of New England, New York and New Jersey. Winners of the Kinereth Gensler Awards became active cooperative members, judging future contests and participating in editorial and executive decisions. The Alice James Award does not carry a cooperative work commitment." The Kundiman Poetry Prize was previously offered through Alice James Books for a first or second book by an Asian American poet. The prize was co-sponsored by Kundiman (nonprofit organization).

Alice James Books also has selected manuscripts for publication through the AJB Translation Series, which accepts queries of poetry manuscripts translated into English.

== Affiliation and funding ==
From 1994 to 2022, the press was affiliated with the University of Maine at Farmington, and offered a publishing internship program for UMF students which offers the students work experience and education. Since 2022, Alice James Books has been headquartered in Pineland Farms in New Gloucester, Maine, where it hosts an independent publishing internship. The press has received funding from the Maine Arts Commission, as well as receiving funding from UMF and the National Endowment for the Arts, private foundations, and individuals.

== Sources ==
- Alice James Books Website
- University of Maine at Farmington, Creative Writing Department
