= List of Warren Wilson College people =

Warren Wilson College is a private liberal arts college work college in Swannanoa, North Carolina. It was established in 1894 as the Asheville Farm School, and became the Warren H. Wilson Vocational Junior College and Associated Schools in 1942. It took its current name in 1966 when it became a four-year college. Following is a list of some of the college's notable alumni and faculty.

== Alumni ==
- Dilruba Ahmed (MFA), poet
- Louise Aronson (MFA, 2006), geriatrician, writer, and professor of medicine at the University of California, San Francisco
- Sally Ball (MFA, 1994), poet and professor at the Arizona State University
- Catherine Barnett (MFA), poet and professor at New York University
- Ven Begamudré (MFA), writer and writer-in-residence for the University of Calgary and the University of Alberta
- Bart Bellairs (1979), college basketball coach at Virginia Military Institute and athletic administrator for Savannah State University and Southeastern Louisiana University
- Sara Benincasa (2005), comedian and television writer
- Reginald Dwayne Betts, poet, legal scholar, and teacher at Emerson College
- Brian Blanchfield (MFA), poet and essayist
- Adrian Blevins (MFA, 2002), poet and professor at Colby College
- Tommye Blount (MFA), poet
- Laure-Anne Bosselaar (MFA), poet and professor
- Brandel France de Bravo (MFA), poet and public health specialist
- Christopher Bursk (MFA) poet
- William Brandon Lacy Campos, poet, writer, columnist, LGBT and HIV/AIDS activist
- Shannon Cain (MFA, 2005), writer
- Bianca Canizio, team captain for the United States Virgin Islands women's national team
- Victoria Chang (MFA, 2005), poet, writer, and chair in poetry at Georgia Tech
- Kipyego Cheluget, Kenyan diplomat and assistant secretary of the Common Market for Eastern and Southern Africa
- Patrick Donnelly (MFA), poet and program director of The Frost Place
- Tony Earley (1983), novelist, short story writer, and Samuel Milton Fleming chair in English at Cornell University
- Elizabeth Eslami (MFA), writer and professor of creative writing at DePauw University
- Diane Gilliam Fisher (MFA), poet
- James Franco (MFA), actor and filmmaker
- Richard P. Gabriel (MFA, 1998), poet and distinguished engineer and chief scientist at Sun Microsystems
- Rayna Gellert, fiddler and former member of The Freight Hoppers
- Donna Gershten (MFA), novelist
- Doreen Gildroy (MFA), poet
- Jennifer Givhan (MFA), author and poet
- Goldie Goldbloom (MFA), novelist, essayist and short story writer
- Lee Meitzen Grue (MFA, 1992), poet
- Shadab Zeest Hashmi (MFA), poet
- Artis Henderson (MFA), journalist
- Janet Holmes (MFA), poet and professor at Boise State University
- Samantha Hunt (MFA), novelist, essayist, and short story writer; professor at the Pratt Institute
- Charlotte Hussey MFA, 1991), poet, literary critic, and English professor at Dawson College and McGill University
- Jenny Johnson (MFA), poet and professor at University of Pittsburgh and West Virginia University
- A. Van Jordan (MFA, 1998), poet
- Pentti Kanerva (A.A., 1956), neuroscientist and the originator of the sparse distributed memory model
- Vita Kari (B.A., 2018), multi-media visual artist and social media personality
- Maeve Kinkead (MFA, 2008), actress and poet
- Mary Leader (MFA), poet and teacher at the University of Memphis and Warren Wilson College
- Krys Lee (MFA), writer, journalist, and translator
- Jeffrey Levine (MFA), poet
- Chris Llewellyn, poet
- Vyvyane Loh (MFA), novelist, choreographer, and physician
- Corey Marks (MFA, 1994), poet
- Jamaal May (MFA), poet
- Grace Dane Mazur, author
- Heather McElhatton (MFA), public radio producer and presenter
- Richard Mibey (B.A., 1976), professor of mycology and vice-chancellor of Moi University
- Elizabeth Mosier (MFA), novelist and essayist
- Angel Nafis (MFA), poet and spoken-word artist
- Mary Jane Nealon (MFA), poet
- Hieu Minh Nguyen (MFA), poet
- Tiana Nobile (MFA), poet
- Achy Obejas (MFA, 1993), writer and translator
- Kira Obolensky (MFA), playwright and author
- Dzvinia Orlowsky (MFA), poet, translator, and editor
- Meghan O'Rourke (MFA, 2005), nonfiction writer, poet, and critic
- Mariah Parker (B.A.), rapper and labor organizer
- Marie Gluesenkamp Perez (non-degreed), United States House of Representatives
- Maya Phillips (MFA), poet and arts critic at large for The New York Times
- Michael Pritchett (MFA), novelist and associate professor at the University of Missouri–Kansas City Volker Campus
- Lewis Pullman, actor and son of Bill Pullman
- Alicia Jo Rabins (MFA, 2009), member of the band Golem, writer, and poet
- Martha Rhodes (MFA), writer, publisher, and college instructor
- Gwyn Hyman Rubio (MFA, 1986), author
- Jim Schley (MFA), poet and editor
- Rebecca Seiferle (MFA, 1989), poet
- Marisa Silver (MFA), author, screenwriter, film director, and college educator
- Tatjana Soli (MFA), novelist and short-story writer
- Sandy Solomon (MFA), poet and writer in residence at Vanderbilt University
- Matthew Specktor (MFA, 2009), novelist and screenwriter
- Katie Spotz (2008), youngest Atlantic solo rower
- Lisa Gluskin Stonestreet (MFA), poet
- Laura-Gray Street (MFA), poet and assistant professor at Randolph College
- Michael Thomas (MFA), author and academic, winner of the International Dublin Literary Award
- Daniel Tobin (MFA), poet and professor at Emerson College
- Duncan Trussell, stand-up comic and actor
- David Weber (B.A.), science fiction and fantasy writer
- Joe Wenderoth (MFA, 1993), poet
- Billy Edd Wheeler (1953), songwriter, performer, writer, and visual artist
- David Wilcox, folk musician
- Fran Wilde (MFA, 1996), science fiction and fantasy writer
- Paul Wright, racing cyclist
- Charles Wyatt (MFA), musician and writer
- David Wroblewski (MFA), novelist
- Martha Zweig (MFA, 1998), poet

== Faculty and staff ==
=== Undergraduate faculty and staff ===
- Ruth Currie-McDaniel, former professor of history and political science
- Stacey Enos, athletic director and head coach of the women's soccer team from 2001 to 2017
- Vievee Francis, poet; creative writing instructor
- Sebastian Matthews, poet; creative writing instructor
- Todd May, political philosopher; professor of philosophy
- Doan Ogden, landscape architect; taught at Asheville Farm School
- Al Petteway, guitarist; artist in residence
- Hank Steinbrecher, head soccer coach and athletic director
- Lisa Sturz, puppeteer
- Lydia Vandenbergh, head women's soccer coach

=== Graduate faculty ===
- Betty Adcock, poet; instructor in the MFA Program for Writers
- Kaveh Akbar, poet, novelist, and editor; instructor in the MFA Program for Writers
- Agha Shahid Ali, poet; instructor in the MFA Program for Writers
- Debra Allbery, poet; director of the MFA Program for Writers from 2009 to 2023, poetry faculty from 1995
- A. Manette Ansay, author; instructor in the MFA Program for Writers
- Lesley Nneka Arimah, writer; instructor in the MFA Program for Writers
- Elizabeth Arnold, poet; instructor in the MFA Program for Writers
- David Baker, poet; instructor in the MFA Program for Writers
- Dean Bakopoulos, writer; instructor in the MFA Program for Writers
- Sally Ball, poet; instructor in the MFA Program for Writers
- Oliver Baez Bendorf, poet; instructor in the MFA Program for Writers
- Wilton Barnhardt, writer and sports journalist; instructor in the MFA Program for Writers
- Rick Barot, poet; instructor in the MFA Program for Writers
- Andrea Barrett, novelist and short story writer; instructor in the MFA Program for Writers
- Charles Baxter, novelist, essayist, and poet; instructor in the MFA Program for Writers
- Don Belton, author and editor; instructor in the MFA Program for Writers
- Karen Bender, novelist and short story writer; instructor in the MFA Program for Writers
- Adria Bernardi, novelist and translator; instructor in the MFA Program for Writers
- Marianne Boruch, poet; instructor in the MFA Program for Writers
- Robert Boswell, short story writer and novelist; instructor in the MFA Program for Writers
- Liam Callanan, novelist; instructor in the MFA Program for Writers
- Gabrielle Calvocoressi, poet, editor, and essayist; instructor in the MFA Program for Writers
- Anne Carson, poet; instructor in the MFA Program for Writers
- Raymond Carver, poet and short story writer; instructor in the MFA Program for Writers
- Maud Casey, novelist; instructor in the MFA Program for Writers
- Christopher Castellani, novelist; instructor in the MFA Program for Writers
- Lan Samantha Chang, novelist and short story writer; instructor in the MFA Program for Writers
- Richard Chess, poet; instructor in the MFA Program for Writers
- Robert Cohen, playwright and dramastist; instructor in the MFA Program for Writers
- Michael Collier, poet; instructor in the MFA Program for Writers
- Frank Conroy, author; instructor in the MFA Program for Writers
- Peter Cooley, poet; instructor in the MFA Program for Writers
- Justin Cronin, novelist; instructor in the MFA Program for Writers
- Charles D’Ambrosio, short story writer and essayist; instructor in the MFA Program for Writers
- Tracy Daugherty, writer and biographers; instructor in the MFA Program for Writers
- Carl Dennis, poet; instructor in the MFA Program for Writers
- Stacey D’Erasmo, novelist; instructor in the MFA Program for Writers
- Stuart Dischell, poet; instructor in the MFA Program for Writers
- Stephen Dobyns, poet and novelist; instructor in the MFA Program for Writers
- Judy Doenges, writer; instructor in the MFA Program for Writers
- Anthony Doerr, novelist and winner of the Pulitzer Prize for Fiction; instructor in the MFA Program for Writers
- Stephen Dunn, poet; instructor in the MFA Program for Writers
- Stuart Dybek, writer and poet; instructor in the MFA Program for Writers
- Kim Edwards, novelist and short story writer; instructor in the MFA Program for Writers
- Lynn Emanuel, poet; instructor in the MFA Program for Writers
- Susan Engberg, novelist; instructor in the MFA Program for Writers
- Danielle Evans, fiction writer; instructor in the MFA Program for Writers
- Richard Ford, novelist and short story writer; instructor in the MFA Program for Writers
- B. H. Fairchild, poet; instructor in the MFA Program for Writers
- Roger Fanning, poet; instructor in the MFA Program for Writers
- Angela Flournoy, novelis; iinstructor in the MFA Program for Writers
- Chris Forhan, poet; instructor in the MFA Program for Writers
- Daisy Fried, poet; instructor in the MFA Program for Writers
- Carol Frost; poet; instructor in the MFA Program for Writers
- Reginald Gibbons, poet; instructor in the MFA Program for Writers
- Louise Glück; poet and winner of the 2020 Nobel Prize in Literature; instructor in the MFA Program for Writers
- Linda Gregerson, poet; instructor in the MFA Program for Writers
- Lauren Groff, novelist; instructor in the MFA Program for Writers
- Judith Grossman, writer; instructor in the MFA Program for Writers
- Jennifer Grotz, poet; instructor in the MFA Program for Writers
- Allan Gurganus, novelist and short story writer; instructor in the MFA Program for Writers
- Donald Hall, poet, writer, editor, and literary critic; instructor in the MFA Program for Writers
- Jane Hamilton, novelist; instructor in the MFA Program for Writers
- Matthea Harvey, poet; instructor in the MFA Program for Writers
- Robert Hass, poet; instructor in the MFA Program for Writers
- Ehud Havazelet, novelist and short story writer; instructor in the MFA Program for Writers
- Brooks Haxton, poet and translator; instructor in the MFA Program for Writers
- David Haynes, novelist; instructor in the MFA Program for Writers
- Edward Hirsch, poet and critic; instructor in the MFA Program for Writers
- Tony Hoagland, poet; instructor in the MFA Program for Writers
- Jonathan Holden, poet; instructor in the MFA Program for Writers
- Marie Howe, poet; instructor in the MFA Program for Writers
- David Huddle, writer; instructor in the MFA Program for Writers
- Allegra Hyde, writer; instructor in the MFA Program for Writers
- John Irving, novelist and screenwriter; instructor in the MFA Program for Writers
- Mark Jarman, poet and critic; instructor in the MFA Program for Writers
- Diane Johnson, novelist and essayist; instructor in the MFA Program for Writers
- Joyce Johnson, novelist; instructor in the MFA Program for Writers
- T. Geronimo Johnson, novelist; instructor in the MFA Program for Writers
- Edward P. Jones; novelist and short story writer; instructor in the MFA Program for Writers
- Rodney Jones, poet; instructor in the MFA Program for Writers
- A. Van Jordan, poet; instructor in the MFA Program for Writers
- Murad Kalam, writer; instructor in the MFA Program for Writers
- Laura Kasischke, poet and fiction writer; instructor in the MFA Program for Writers
- Brigit Pegeen Kelly, poet; instructor in the MFA Program for Writers
- Pagan Kennedy, author and columnist; instructor in the MFA Program for Writers
- Laila Lalami, writer; instructor in the MFA Program for Writers
- Victor LaValle, novelist and short story writer; instructor in the MFA Program for Writers
- Mary Leader, poet; instructor in the MFA Program for Writers
- Dana Levin, poet; instructor in the MFA Program for Writers
- Larry Levis, poet; instructor in the MFA Program for Writers
- Sandra Lim, poet; instructor in the MFA Program for Writers
- Margot Livesey, novelist and essayist; instructor in the MFA Program for Writers
- James Longenbach, poet and critic; instructor in the MFA Program for Writers
- Thomas Lux, poet; instructor in the MFA Program for Writers
- Thomas Mallon, novelist, essayist, and critic; instructor in the MFA Program for Writers
- Maurice Manning, poet; instructor in the MFA Program for Writers
- Michael Martone, writer; instructor in the MFA Program for Writers
- William Matthews, poet and essayist; instructor in the MFA Program for Writers
- Grace Dane Mazur, novelist and short story writer; instructor in the MFA Program for Writers
- Nina McConigley, fiction writer and playwright; instructor in the MFA Program for Writers
- Campbell McGrath, poet; instructor in the MFA Program for Writers
- Erin McGraw, novelist and short story writer; instructor in the MFA Program for Writers
- Heather McHugh, poet; instructor in the MFA Program for Writers
- Kevin McIlvoy, novelist and editor; instructor in the MFA Program for Writers
- James McManus, writer; instructor in the MFA Program for Writers
- T. M. McNally, novelist and short story writer; instructor in the MFA Program for Writers
- Pablo Medina, poet and novelist; instructor in the MFA Program for Writers
- Ana Menendez, novelist; instructor in the MFA Program for Writers
- Claire Messud, novelist; instructor in the MFA Program for Writers
- Lisel Mueller, poet; instructor in the MFA Program for Writers
- Antonya Nelson, novelist; instructor in the MFA Program for Writers
- Susan Neville, writer and essayist; instructor in the MFA Program for Writers
- Craig Nova, novelist; instructor in the MFA Program for Writers
- Alix Ohlin, novelist and short story writer; instructor in the MFA Program for Writers
- Matthew Olzmann, poet; instructor in the MFA Program for Writers
- Steve Orlen, writer; instructor in the MFA Program for Writers
- Peter Orner, novelist and short story writer; instructor in the MFA Program for Writers
- Gregory Orr, poet; instructor in the MFA Program for Writers
- Michael Parker, novelist; instructor in the MFA Program for Writers
- Janet Peery, novelist and short story writer; instructor in the MFA Program for Writers
- Kathleen Peirce, poet; instructor in the MFA Program for Writers
- Lucia Perillo; poet; instructor in the MFA Program for Writers
- Carl Phillips, poet and writer; instructor in the MFA Program for Writers
- Rowan Ricardo Phillips, poet; instructor in the MFA Program for Writers
- Connie Porter, children's writer; instructor in the MFA Program for Writers
- Francine Prose, novelist, short story writer, essayist, and critic; instructor in the MFA Program for Writers
- Hanna Pylväinen, novelist; instructor in the MFA Program for Writers
- Nahid Rachlin, novelist; instructor in the MFA Program for Writers
- Claudia Rankine; poet, essayist, and playwright; instructor in the MFA Program for Writers
- Barbara Ras; poet, publisher, and translator; instructor in the MFA Program for Writers
- Frederick Reiken, novelist; instructor in the MFA Program for Writers
- Martha Rhodes, poet and publisher; instructor in the MFA Program for Writers
- Richard Rhodes, Pulitzer Prize-winning author; instructor in the MFA Program for Writers
- Marilynn Robinson, novelist and essayist; instructor in the MFA Program for Writers
- Robin Romm, fiction and nonfiction writer; instructor in the MFA Program for Writers
- Mary Ruefle, poet and essayist; instructor in the MFA Program for Writers
- Richard Russo, novelist, short story writer, and screenwriter; instructor in the MFA Program for Writers
- Michael Ryan, poet and writer; instructor in the MFA Program for Writers
- Ira Sadoff, poet; instructor in the MFA Program for Writers
- Jason Schneiderman, poet; instructor in the MFA Program for Writers
- Alan Shapiro, poet; instructor in the MFA Program for Writers
- Jim Shepard, novelist and short story writer; instructor in the MFA Program for Writers
- David Shields, author and film director; instructor in the MFA Program for Writers
- Jane Shore, poet; instructor in the MFA Program for Writers
- Grace Shulman, poet; instructor in the MFA Program for Writers
- Joan Silber, novelist and short story writer; instructor in the MFA Program for Writers
- Marisa Silver, writer and film director; instructor in the MFA Program for Writers
- Bennett Sims, novelist; instructor in the MFA Program for Writers
- John Skoyles, poet; instructor in the MFA Program for Writers
- Tom Sleigh, dramatist; instructor in the MFA Program for Writers
- Jane Smiley, novelist; instructor in the MFA Program for Writers
- Dave Smith, poet; instructor in the MFA Program for Writers
- Dominic Smith, novelist; instructor in the MFA Program for Writers
- Anna Solomon, novelist; instructor in the MFA Program for Writers
- Patrick Somerville, novelist and screenwriter; instructor in the MFA Program for Writers
- Debra Spark, novelist, short story writer, essayist, and editor; instructor in the MFA Program for Writers
- Megan Staffel, writer; instructor in the MFA Program for Writers
- Mary Szybist, poet; instructor in the MFA Program for Writers
- Daniel Tobin, poet; instructor in the MFA Program for Writers
- Chase Twichell, poet; instructor in the MFA Program for Writers
- Laura van den Berg, fiction writer; instructor in the MFA Program for Writers
- Ellen Bryant Voigt, poet; instructor in the MFA Program for Writers
- Namita Gupta Wiggers, artist and curator; founding director of MA in Critical and Historical Craft Studies from 2017 to 2023
- Alan Williamson, novolist and journalist; instructor in the MFA Program for Writers
- Eleanor Wilner, poet and editor; instructor in the MFA Program for Writers
- Geoffrey Wolff, novelist and writer; instructor in the MFA Program for Writers
- Tobias Wolff, short story writer, memoirist, and novelist; instructor in the MFA Program for Writers
- Monica Youn, poet: instructor in the MFA Program for Writers
- Dean Young, poet; instructor in the MFA Program for Writers
- C. Dale Young, poet, writer, and editor; instructor in the MFA Program for Writers

== Presidents ==
- Arthur Bannerman (1942–1971)
- Reuben A. "Ben" Holden (1971–1986)
- John J. Carey (1986–1988)
- Alfred O. Canon (Interim, 1988–1989, 1989–1992)
- Doug Orr Jr. (1992–2006)
- Sandy Pfeiffer (2006–2012)
- Stephn Solnick (2012–2017)
- Lynn Morton (2017–2022)
- Bill Chirstie (Interim, 2022–2023)
- Damián J. Fernández (2023–to date)
