= Cohen Awards (Ploughshares) =

From 1986 through 2010, the Cohen Awards honored the best short story and poem published in the literary journal Ploughshares. The awards were sponsored by longtime Ploughshares patrons Denise and Mel Cohen. Finalists were nominated by staff editors, and the winners were selected by the advisory editors. Each winner received a cash prize of $600. The journal has since replaced the award with the Alice Hoffman Prize for Fiction.

== Past winners ==
Year	Poetry	fiction	Nonfiction
1986	Tom Sleigh, Hope, Winter 1984	Gerald Duff, Fire Ants, Winter 1984	Domenic Stansberry, John Gardner: The Return Home, Fall 1984
1987	Al Young, from 22 Moon Poems, Fall 1986	Mona Simpson, Lonnie Tishman, Spring 1986	Phillip Lopate, Against Joie de Vivre, Spring 1986
1988	Carol Frost, In Scarecrow's Garden, Spring 1987	Linda Bamber, The Time-to-Teach-Jane-Eyre-Again Blues, Fall 1987	Gerald Shapiro, Evan S. Connell: A Profile, Fall 1986
1989	Dennis Sampson, The Commandment, Winter 1988	Josip Novakovich, The Apple, Fall 1988	Richard Yates, R.V. Cassill's Clem Anderson, Fall 1988
1990	Patricia Traxler, from The Widow's Words, Winter 1989 Michael Ryan, A Burglary, Spring 1989	Christopher Tilghman, In a Father's Place, Fall 1989	James Carroll, The Virtue of Writing, Fall 1989
1991	Susan Mitchell, Night Music, Winter 1990-91	Carol Roh-Spaulding, Waiting for Mr. Kim, Fall 1990	William Kittredge, from Hole in the Sky, Winter 1990-91
1992	Tess Gallagher, from The Valentine Elegies, Spring 1991 Richard McCann, Nights of 1990, Winter 1991-92	Eileen Pollack, Neversink, Fall 1991	Dan Wakefield, Lion: A Memoir of Mark Van Doren, Fall 1991
1993	Richard Garcia, In the Year 1946, Spring 1992	Ron Carlson, Blazo, Spring 1992	Debra Spark, The Lure of the West, Spring 1992
1994	Cleopatra Mathis, The Story, Winter 1993-94	Fred Leebron, Lovelock, Fall 1993	
1995	Mary Ruefle, Glory, Winter 1994-95	Marshall N. Klimasewiski, Snowfield, Spring 1994	Charles Baxter, Dysfunctional Narratives, Fall 1994
1996	Louise Glück, Penelope's Stubbornness, Winter 1995-96	Janet Desaulniers, After Rosa Parks, Winter 1995-96	
1997	Campbell McGrath, Praia dos Orixas, Winter 1996-97	Andrew Sean Greer, Come Live with Me and Be My Love, Fall 1996	
1998	Maxine Swann, Flower Children, Fall 1997	Mark Doty, Mercy on Broadway, Spring 1997	
1999	Herman Fong, Grandfather's Alphabet, Spring 1998	Chris Adrian, The Sum of Our Parts, Winter 1998-99	
2000	Jonah Winter, Sestina: Bob, Spring 1999	Judith Grossman, How Aliens Think, Spring 1999	
2001	Adrian C. Louis, This is the Time of Grasshoppers and All That I See is Dying, Winter 2000	Elizabeth Graver, The Mourning Door, Fall 2000	
2002	Caroline Finkelstein, Conjecture Number One Thousand, Fall 2001	Julie Orringer, Pilgrims, Spring 2001	
2003	Scott Withiam, Walk Right In, Spring 2002	Joan Silber, The High Road, Fall 2002	
2004	Jane Mead, Was Light, Spring 2003	Rebecca Soppe, The Pantyhose Man, Winter 2003-04	
2005	Daisy Fried, Shooting Kinesha, Spring 2004	Xu Xi, Famine, Winter 2004-05	
2006	R. T. Smith, Dar He, Spring 2005	Laura Kasischke, If a Stranger Approaches You about Carrying a Foreign Object with You onto the Plane . . ., Fall 2005	
2007	Victoria Chang, Proof, Spring 2006	Joan Wickersham, The Woodwork, Fall 2006	
2008	Jennifer Grotz, The Life and Times of George Van Den Heuvel, Winter 2007-08	Bret Anthony Johnston, Republican, Fall 2007	
2009	Tarfia Faizullah, from Interview with a Birangona, Winter 2008-09	Steven Schwartz, Bless Everybody, Fall 2008	
2010	Adrian Blevins, The Waning, Winter 2009-10	Andria Nacina Cole, Leaving Women, Spring 2009	
