= Frontier Poetry =

American poetry magazine

- Founded: 2017
- Founder: Kim Winternheimer, Joshua Roark
- Country of origin: United States
- Headquarters location: Portland, Oregon & Los Angeles, California
- Distribution: Independent Publishers Group
- Publication types: Online, Books
- Fiction genres: Poetry
- Official website: www.frontierpoetry.com

Frontier Poetry is an American poetry magazine and publisher based in Portland, Oregon and Los Angeles, California. Established in 2016 by founding editors, Kim Winternheimer and Joshua Roark, the magazine publishes work from newer poets and unpublished writers.

== Online ==
Frontier Poetry publishes much of its content online, including poetry, essays, interviews with literary figures, craft essays, submission opportunities to other literary magazines and publications, book reviews, and literary and cultural criticism.

It publishes essays and commentary from guests including: Kwame Dawes of Prairie Schooner, John Skoyles of Ploughshares, Xandria Phillips of Winter Tangerine, and Jessica Faust of The Southern Review.

== Publications and awards ==
Frontier Poetry focuses on newer writers with the aim to "lift people up who are just breaking into the community." yet occasionally publishes works from established poets as well. They are open to writers with multiple chapbooks, self-published collections or saw a circulation below 3000 copies. Frontier Poetry accepts submissions and poems from writers around the world. Frontier also sees regular publication on Verse Daily.

Frontier Poetry awards an "Award for New Poets" annually, which showcases and promotes emerging poets. The publication hosts several other contests year round, including its fellowship program, which offers financial assistance and grants to emerging poets, publication, and mentorship opportunities.

=== Digital Chapbook ===
The Frontier Poetry Digital Chapbook serves as an endorsement for new writers. Printed annually, one poet receives a digital edition of their chapbook, cash prizes, and distribution online.

=== New Voices ===
New Voices appear online every Friday throughout the year. This category is open throughout the year and invites emerging writers to submit poetry, selected by Frontier Poetry staff. At minimum, two authors are chosen each month from this free category and are paid for publication rights.

=== Featured poetry ===
Frontier Poetry also provides Featured Poetry, or poems written by established guest writers to appear online throughout the year. In this way, the publication aligns their new writers with established writers while offering free access to poetry to its readership.

==== Featured Writers and Collaborators in Frontier Poetry ====
- Hanif Abdurraqib, 2017 (Poem)
- Aria Aber, 2022 (Judge)
- Hannah Aizenman, 2018 (Editors Talk Interview)
- Kaveh Akbar, 2017 (Poem)
- Rick Barot, 2019 (Editors Talk Interview)
- Gabrielle Bates, 2018 (Editors Talk Interview)
- Greg Brownderville, 2018 (Editors Talk Interview)
- Sumita Chakraborty, 2018 (Editors Talk Interview)
- Victoria Chang, 2019 (In Class Interview, Judge)
- Jos Charles, 2017 (Poem), 2018 (Interview)
- Tiana Clark, 2017 (Poem)
- Melissa Crowe, 2018 (Editors Talk Interview)
- J. P. Dancing Bear, 2022 (Judge)
- Jim Daniels, 2017 (Poem)
- Kwame Dawes, 2017 (Editors Talk Interview)
- Mai Der Vang, 2017 (Poem)
- Saddiq Dzukogi, 2022 (Judge)
- Safia Elhillo, 2017 (Poem)
- Eve Ewing, 2019 (Judge)
- Tarfia Faizullah, 2022 (Judge)
- Jessica Faust, 2018 (Editors Talk Interview)
- Sarah Gambito, 2019 (Interview, Judge)
- Tyehimba Jess, 2017 (Judge)
- Chelene Knight, 2019 (Editors Talk Interview)
- Debra Marquart, 2019 (In Class Interview)
- Don Share, 2018 (Editors Talk Interview, Judge)
- John Skoyles, 2017 (Editors Talk Interview)
- Lisa Spaar, 2019 (In Class Interview)
- Tallinn Tahajian, 2018 (Editors Talk Interview)
- Ocean Vuong, 2019 (Judge)
- Marion Wrenn, 2018 (Editors Talk Interview)
- Matthew Zapruder, 2018 (Judge)
