= Emily Hyland =

American restaurateur, poet, and yoga teacher

- Born: 1982 (age 43–44)
- Education: Roger Williams University (BFA); Brooklyn College (MFA, MA)
- Occupations: Restaurateur, poet, yoga teacher
- Known for: Co-founder of Pizza Loves Emily and Emmy Squared Pizza
- Notable work: EMILY: The Cookbook; Divorced Business Partners: A Love Story; My Wise Little Ghost
- Spouse(s): Matt Hyland Jeffrey Silberman (m. 2022)
- Awards: Howling Bird Press Poetry Prize (2024)
- Website: emilyhyland.com

Emily Hyland (born 1982) is an American restaurateur, poet, and yoga teacher. With chef Matt Hyland, she co-founded the Pizza Loves Emily and Emmy Squared Pizza restaurant groups, and co-authored EMILY: The Cookbook (2018). Hyland is also the author of two poetry collections, including Divorced Business Partners: A Love Story (2024), which received the Howling Bird Press Poetry Prize, and My Wise Little Ghost (2026).

Hyland is a co-owner and director of YogaSource in Santa Fe, New Mexico. She co-leads writing and movement retreats with the poet Mark Doty.

== Early life and education ==
Hyland was born in 1982. She grew up in Ridgewood, New Jersey and attended Roger Williams University in Rhode Island, where she earned a Bachelor of Fine Arts and met chef Matt Hyland. She later earned an MFA in poetry and an MA in English education from Brooklyn College.

Before entering the restaurant industry, she worked as a high school English teacher and instructional coach in New York City public schools and as an adjunct English professor at New York City College of Technology.

== Career ==
=== Restaurants ===
In 2014, Hyland and Matt Hyland opened the wood-fired pizzeria EMILY, also known as Pizza Loves Emily, in Clinton Hill, Brooklyn. She managed front-of-house operations and served as the restaurant's opening CEO and national brand ambassador while Matt Hyland developed the menu, including the Emmy Burger. The restaurant became known for its namesake "Emily" pie, topped with three cheeses, pistachios, and honey, and for the Emmy Burger, which has appeared on multiple "best burger" lists in New York City.

In 2016, they opened the first Emmy Squared in Williamsburg, Brooklyn, specializing in Detroit-style pizza and the Le Big Matt burger. Later that year, investors Howard Greenstone and Ken Levitan joined as partners to help expand the business. The group later opened locations in cities including Nashville, Philadelphia, Washington, D.C., Louisville, Atlanta, Charlotte, Alexandria, and Birmingham. By the 2020s, Pizza Loves Emily operated about 30 restaurants.

In 2017, Emily Hyland and Matt Hyland were named StarChefs Rising Star Concept Chefs for Emmy Squared.

After their divorce, Emily and Matt Hyland continue to co-own and operate the original EMILY. In 2022, Hyland moved to Santa Fe, New Mexico, from where she oversees operations and philanthropic initiatives at EMILY in Clinton Hill but focuses primarily on poetry and yoga.

=== Writing ===
Hyland's debut poetry collection, Divorced Business Partners: A Love Story, was published by Howling Bird Press in October 2024 and was the recipient of the Howling Bird Press Poetry Prize in 2024. Her individual poems have appeared in The Brooklyn Review, Frontier Poetry, The Hollins Critic, Palette Poetry, and Mount Hope Magazine, among others.

Her second poetry collection, My Wise Little Ghost, is forthcoming from Trio House Press in July 2026. A third collection is forthcoming from Cornerstone Press, an imprint of the University of Wisconsin Press, in March 2027.

Hyland is the co-author, with Matt Hyland, of EMILY: The Cookbook (Ballantine Books, 2018), a debut cookbook of more than 100 recipes drawn from the couple's restaurants. Reviewing the book, The New York Times food editor Sam Sifton called it "perhaps the first really full-throated American pizza cookbook." Publishers Weekly gave the book a starred review, and The New York Times named it one of the "Best 19 Cookbooks for Fall 2018."

=== Yoga and wellness ===
Hyland began practicing yoga in 2007 and completed a 200-hour teacher training program at Yogamaya in 2012. She is the co-owner and director of YogaSource in Santa Fe, where she teaches an array of classes from somatic flow to yin to strength training. Hyland co-leads writing and movement retreats with the poet Mark Doty, including residential retreats in upstate New York, Mexico, and New Mexico.

In 2023, Hyland underwent a prophylactic double mastectomy with DIEP flap reconstruction after losing several maternal relatives to breast cancer. Her Brooklyn restaurant and Santa Fe yoga studio have hosted annual fundraisers for The Breasties, a nonprofit supporting people affected by breast and gynecologic cancers.

== Personal life ==
Hyland was married to Matt Hyland from 2007 to 2019; the two have continued to co-own and operate their original restaurant together following their divorce. Hyland is remarried to the attorney Jeffrey Silberman, as of 2022. She lives in Santa Fe, New Mexico.

== Bibliography ==
- EMILY: The Cookbook (with Matthew Hyland), 2018
- Divorced Business Partners: A Love Story (2024)
- My Wise Little Ghost (2026)
- Post-Mastectomy Poems (2026)
