= Andrea Reinkemeyer =

American composer (born 1976)

Andrea Reinkemeyer (born 1976) is an American composer from Portland, Oregon. She graduated with a bachelor's degree from the University of Oregon and continued her studies in composition at the University of Michigan, graduating with a master's and doctoral degree. She was awarded a 2017 Virginia B. Toulmin Orchestral Commission, 2022-23 Edith Green Distinguished Professor and 2019 Julie Olds and Thomas Hellie Creative Achievement Award for Linfield Faculty; her Smoulder for Wind Ensemble was awarded the 2021 Alex Shapiro Prize in the 40th Annual Search for New Music by the International Alliance of Women in Music (IAWM) and named a 2020 finalist for the National Band Association William D. Revelli Composition Contest.

Her music has been described as "haunting", "clever, funky, jazzy and virtuosic".

While at the University of Michigan, Reinkemeyer taught as a graduate student instructor in electronic composition. After completing her education, she took a position teaching composition, theory and technology at Bowling Green State University in Ohio. She previously served as Associate Professor of Music Composition and Theory and Chair of the Department of Music at Linfield University in McMinnville, Oregon (2014-2023). She is currently the Director of Composition and Associate Professor at George Mason University (Fairfax, Virginia).

She married Brian Amer and has one daughter. Reinkemeyer has also worked teaching music in Detroit community outreach programs.

== Works ==
Selected works include:

- Into the Labyrinth (2022) for Narrator, Drum set, Wind Ensemble, and Wind Band (orchestrator)
- Letter to a friend (2022) for Soprano, Horn in F, and Piano (Megan Levad and D. Allen, poets)
- The Diver (2022) for Soprano and Piano (Megan Levad, poet)
- Smoulder (2021) for Orchestra
- Red Flame (2021) for Flute and Marimba
- Hustle and Bustle (2021) for Concert Band
- Triptych: Three Disasters a Virtual Opera Scene (2020); Patrick Wohlmut, libretto
- Smoulder (2019) for Wind Ensemble
- Opening Up (2019) for Narrator and String Quartet
- Water Sings Fire (2018) for Orchestra
- in the speaking silence (2018) for Alto Saxophone and Bassoon
- Saturation (2017) for Soprano Saxophone and Piano
- From Cycles of Eternity (2017) for Women's Vocal Ensemble; Henrietta Cordelia Ray, poet
- Crisp Point Fanfare (2017) for Brass Quintet
- When Justice Reigns (2016) for Mixed Choir; Janine Applegate, poet
- The Thaw (2016) for Soprano, Tenor, Mixed Choir and Wind Ensemble; Artis Henderson, poet
- NaamJai (Liquid Heart) (2015) for Orchestra
- Wings to Air (2013) for Flute
- Things Heard, Misunderstood (2012) for Alto Saxophone
- Wrought Iron (2012) for Flute and Percussion
- Dos Danzas (2010) for Concert Band
- Wild Silk (2009) for Baritone Saxophone, Percussion and Piano
- Half Moon Nocturne (2007) for Clarinet in B-flat, Bassoon, Horn in F, Piano, Violin, Viola, Cello & Bass
- Souvenirs (2006) for Piano
- Lured by the Horizon (2005) for Orchestra
- Through Leaves (2004) for Percussion and Fixed Media
- Elegy (2001) for Viola and Fixed Media
- #@&%!* (expletive deleted) (2000) for Percussion Quartet
- Four Poems for Robin (1999, rev. 2006) for Soprano and Viola; Gary Snyder, poet
