= Adam Halbur =

American-born poet

Adam Halbur is an American-born poet. He received the resident poet award from The Frost Place in 2010. His first book was POOR MANNERS and his work has been published in various journals, such as The Fourth River, Forklift, OH and Verse Wisconsin. He was a contributing poet to the anthology, Never Again: Poems about First Experiences, edited by Laure-Anne Bosselaar. He is an editor for Go North.
