= Nieson =

Nieson is a surname. Notable people with the surname include:

- Chuck Nieson (1942–2026), American baseball player
- Marc Nieson (fl. from 1992), American screenwriter and professor

== See also ==
- Nielson, another surname
