= Daniel Tobin =

American poet

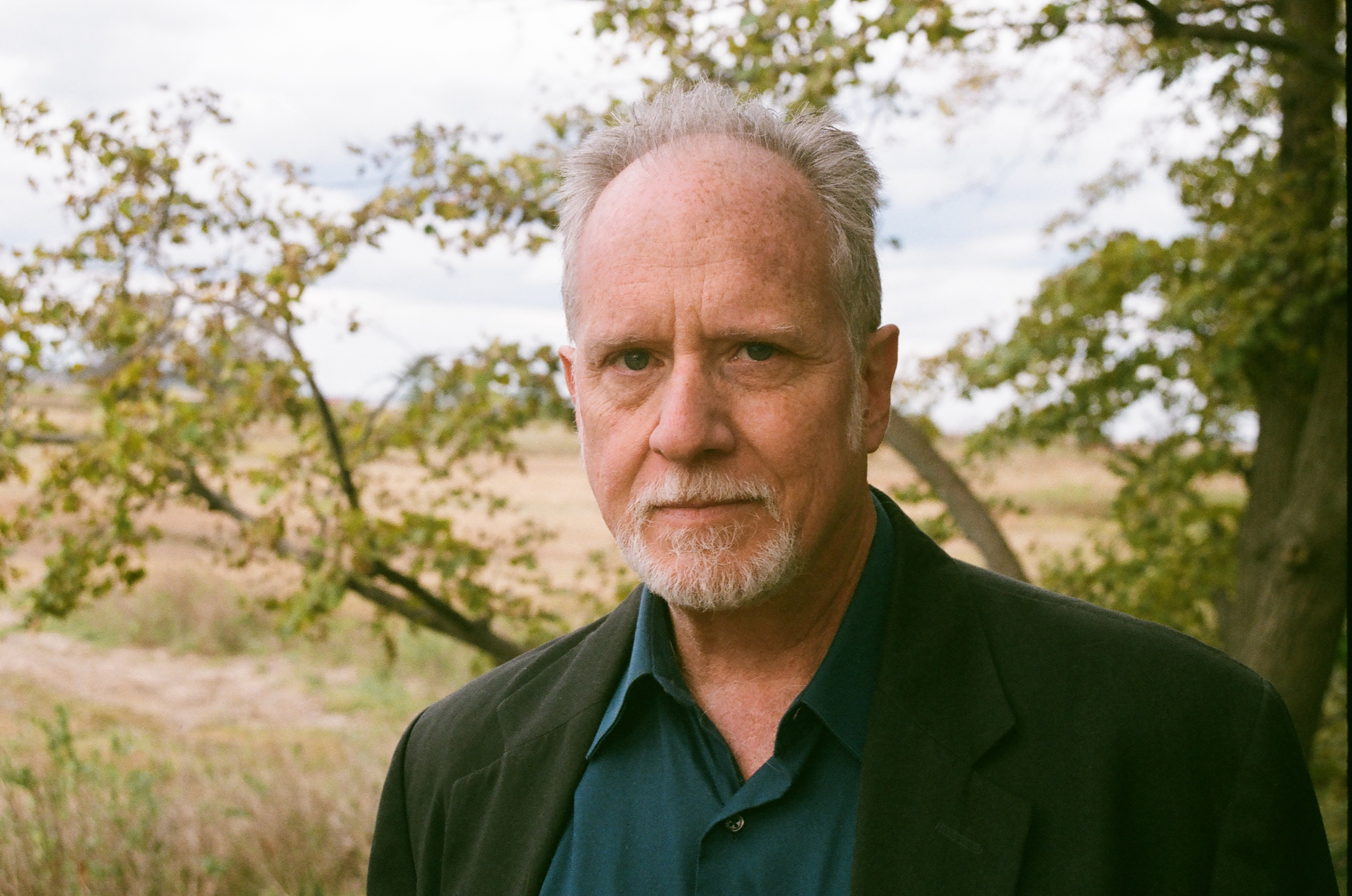
- Born: January 13, 1958 (age 68); New York City, US
- Education: Iona College; Harvard University; Warren Wilson College
- Writing career
- Genre: poetry
- Notable work: Where the World is Made
- Notable awards: Katherine Bakeless Nason Prize; Massachusetts Book Award; Julia Ward Howe Award

Daniel Tobin (born January 13, 1958) is an American poet, scholar, editor, and essayist.

== Life ==
Daniel Tobin was born in Bay Ridge, Brooklyn, New York, to Gerard Tobin and Helen Ruane Tobin. Both parents were of Irish ancestry, and his upbringing in Brooklyn and his ancestral links to Ireland inform his poetry, scholarship, and teaching.

He graduated from Xaverian High School before attending Iona College where he graduated with a B.A. in Religious Studies, as well as in Psychology. He also graduated from Harvard University with a Master of Theological Studies, from Warren Wilson College with an M.F.A. in Poetry, and from the University of Virginia with a Ph.D. in Religion and Literature. He has taught at James Madison University in Virginia, Carthage College in Wisconsin, the School of the Art Institute of Chicago, and the Program for Writers at Warren Wilson College, with which he maintains an affiliation.

He is presently Professor of Writing, Literature and Publishing at Emerson College in Boston, where he previously was Department Chair and Interim Dean of the School of the Arts. He is a citizen of both America and Ireland. He is married to poet and scholar Christine Casson.

== Reception of the poetry ==
Daniel Tobin's poems have appeared in a myriad of journals, from The Times Literary Supplement to The Paris Review to Poetry, and hundreds of others on both sides in America and Europe, as well as in more than fifty anthologies, including The Norton Introduction to Poetry.

Tobin's first book of poems, Where the World is Made, won the Katherine Bakeless Nason Prize. The poems reveal a quest for transcendence with a strong theological impulse, though without appeal to dogma. The judge of the award, Ellen Bryant Voigt, called the book “a musical Bildungroman… a first book of remarkable authority.” Edward Hirsch praised the book as a “work profoundly alert to spiritual matters” composed of ‘finely wrought poems… in search of the sacred,” and Eleanor Wilner viewed the poems as “darkly devotional… unsparing, unsparing at times harrowing in their awareness.”

Double Life gained particular praise for its polyphonic sequence on the life of the Spanish plantation master turned friar, Bartolome de las Casas, and its “Homage to Bosh,” a long ekphrastic poem based on the paintings of Hieronymous Bosh.

Eamonn Wall described The Narrows, Tobin's third book, as a “mural in verse” as “a prodigious feat of raw physical, moral, psychic and literary energy.” Of the book B.H Fairchild wrote: “All stories of arrival and survival in America are the American story, but rarely are they told as compellingly as this one… a poem of narrative power and astonishing lyric depth and grace.”

A review of Second Things, his fourth book, marked Tobin as fast becoming “one of the best poets of his generation.” Belated Heavens, in turn, won the Massachusetts Book Award. Of The Net, Tobin's sixth book of poems, David Ferry remarked: These are very beautiful poems, and The Net is a very beautiful book” that displays “an extraordinary capacity for using his resources as a poet through his command of diction and idiom, and through his versification.” “The whole book is a master class in craft,” remarked Jill Alexander Essbaum.

The book-length poem From Nothing, on the life of Jesuit priest and physicist, Georges Lemaître, won the Julia Ward Howe Award and is part of a proposed three book trilogy. On From Nothing, Emily Grosholz reflects, “the poet draws the weft of scientific vocabulary through the warp of everyday speech.” “In From Nothing,” Alan Shapiro declared, “Tobin brings his learning and astounding imaginative powers to bear on such central questions as the origin and end of the universe… a memorable, powerful and moving book that should be read by everyone who wonders how we got here and what our being here can mean.”

Steven Schneider called The Stone in the Air, Tobin's suite of translations from the German of Paul Celan, “compelling and haunting, a testimony to the power of language and poetry to confront the unspeakable.”

The New York Times named Blood Labors one of the Best Poetry Books of the Year. “Blood Labors is an ebullient and ecclesiastical wonder, capturing more of creation, the uncreated, and the recreated than any dozen books on a poetry bookshelf,” Barbara Ras commented, “[it] dazzles with its brilliance.”

Ryan Wilson declared that The Mansions ". . . is nothing less than a wonder. In its compendious learning, its consummate artistry, and its spiritual wisdom, this poem inspires genuine awe, and it challenges the reader to think more broadly and more acutely, to feel more profoundly, and to live life more attentively."

== Scholarship ==
Tobin has published essays on poetry, and is the author of Passage to the Center: Imagination and the Sacred in the Poetry of Seamus Heaney, a study of religious motifs in the work of poet Seamus Heaney.

Tobin is the editor of The Book of Irish American Poetry from the Eighteenth Century to the Present and of two anthologies of the work of transnational feminist, leftist poet Lola Ridge: Light in Hand: The Selected Early Poems of Lola Ridge and To the Many: The Collected Early Works of Lola Ridge.

Poet’s Work, Poet’s Play: Essays on the Practice and the Art (with poet Pimone Triplett) brings together essays from the faculty of the Program for Writers at Warren Wilson College.

== Works ==
- Where the World is Made, University Press of New England, 1999, ISBN 978-0-87451-956-3
- Double Life, Louisiana State University Press, 2004, ISBN 978-0-8071-2956-2
- The Narrows, Four Way Books, 2005, ISBN 978-1-884800-59-7
- Second Things, Four Way Books, 2008, ISBN 978-1-884800-88-7
- Belated Heavens, Four Way Books, 2010 ISBN 978-1935536031
- The Net, Four Way Books, 2014 ISBN 978-1935536406
- From Nothing, Four Way Books, 2016 ISBN 978-1935536697
- Blood Labors, Four Way Books, 2018 ISBN 978-1945588198
- The Stone in the Air: A Suite of Forty Poems, Versions of Paul Celan Salmon Poetry, 2018 ISBN 978-1910669693
- The Mansions, Four Way Books, 2023 ISBN 978-1954245600
- From the Distances of Sleep, Staircase Books, 2025

=== Criticism ===
Critical Studies and Essays

- Passage to the Center: Imagination and the Sacred in the Poetry of Seamus Heaney, University of Kentucky Press (1999)ISBN 978-0813120836
- Awake in America: An Inquiry into Irish American Poetry, University of Notre Dame Press (2011) ISBN 978-0268042370
- On Serious Earth, Orison Books (2019) ISBN 978-1949039030

Editor

- To the Many: Collected Early Poems of Lola Ridge Little Island Press 2018
- The Book of Irish American Poetry from the Eighteenth Century to the Present University Press of Notre Dame 2008
- Light in Hand: Selected Early Poems of Lola Ridge Quale Press 2007
- Poet's Work, Poet's Play: Essays on the Practice and the Art University of Michigan Press 2007

== Awards ==
2023

- National Indie Excellence Awards for The Mansions: 18th Annual Contest
- Human Relations Indie Book Awards for The Mansions

2018

- Pushcart Prize for "The White Road"
- Best Poetry Books of 2018, New York Times, for Blood Labors
- Verse Daily (Featured Poem) "Post-Orpheus" from The Stone in the Air
- Stephen J. Meringoff Poetry Award for "This Broken Symmetry"
- Special Commendation (Poetry Society UK) for To the Many: Collected Early Works of Lola Ridge (Editor)

2017

- Julia Ward Howe Book Prize for From Nothing (Boston Authors Club)

2016

- Verse Daily (Featured Poem) "Cove" from From Nothing

2012

- Best American Poetry "The Turnpike"

2011

- The Massachusetts Book Award in Poetry for Belated Heavens
- Four Way Books Fellow
- Massachusetts Poetry Festival "Must Read Book" for Belated Heavens

2010

- Massachusetts Cultural Council Grant Finalist

2009

- Guggenheim Fellow

2005

- Foreword INDIES Honorable Mention Poetry Book of the Year for The Narrows
- Artist of the Month (June)

2004

- Verse Daily (Featured Poem) "To Acedia"

1999

- Robert Frost Fellowship

1998

- Katherine Bakeless Nason Prize in Poetry, Bread Loaf/University Press of New England
- Vermont Studio Center Fellowship in Poetry

1996

- Creative Writing Fellowship, National Endowment for the Arts
