= David Graham (American poet) =

American poet

David Graham is an American writer married to the artist Lee Shippey. He has published six collections of poetry, as well as poetry and short stories in numerous literary magazines. Born and raised in Johnstown, New York, he has taught English at Ripon College in Ripon, Wisconsin since 1987, where he became full professor in 2001. In 1996 he was poet in residence at The Frost Place in Franconia, NH.

== Education ==
- M. F. A. in English, University of Massachusetts Amherst MFA Program for Poets & Writers, 1980
- B.A. Dartmouth College, 1975. Summa cum laude. Major: English Literature and Creative Writing

== Books ==
- The Honey of Earth. Terrapin Books, 2019.
- Local News: Poetry About Small Towns. (Poetry anthology) Ed. David Graham & Tom Montag. MWPH Books, 2019.
- David Graham: Greatest Hits 1975-2000 Pudding House Publications, 2001
- Stutter Monk Flume Press, 2000
- Doggedness Devil's Millhopper Press, c. 1989 but appeared 1991
- Second Wind Texas Tech University Press, 1990.
- Magic Shows Cleveland State University Poetry Center, 1986
- Common Waters Flume Press, 1986
- After Confession: Poetry as Autobiography (Co-edited with Kate Sontag) Graywolf Press, 2001
