= Frances Cha =

South Korean and American author (born 19??

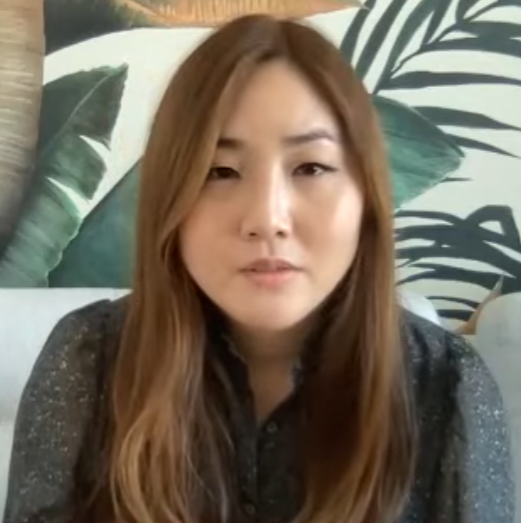
- In a Columbia alumni video in 2021
- Born: Saint Paul, Minnesota, U.S.
- Citizenship: South Korea and United States
- Education: Dartmouth College
- Occupation: Novelist
- Writing career
- Genre: Fantasy
- Website: Official website

Frances Cha (Note: Her birth date is unknown.) is a South Korean and American writer. She was born in Saint Paul, Minnesota, lived in Texas when she was very young, went to elementary school in Hong Kong, moved to Korea when she was 11 or 12, and currently teaches fiction in Columbia University's Master of Fine Arts program. She is a former travel and culture editor for CNN in Seoul and Hong Kong.

== Education ==
Cha knew she wanted to become a writer at age eight. Cha graduated from Dartmouth College with a bachelor's degree in English Literature and Asian Studies in 2007. The large amounts of time she spent in both Korea and the United States taught her to navigate multiple cultures and to write for multiple audiences. She has dual US and South Korean citizenship. At Dartmouth she was editor-in-chief of the literary journal. While at Dartmouth, Catherine Tudish and Cleopatra Mathis were significant influences upon her. Cha graduated from Columbia's School of the Arts (MFA) master's program in creative writing in 2011.

== Career ==
Cha's first novel, If I Had Your Face, is about four young women in Seoul trying to find their way in a world defined by unrealistic standards of beauty amidst economic inequity, entrenched classism, and patriarchy. This book was "named one of the Best Books of the Year by Time Magazine, NPR, and BBC, among other publications." In relation to having four main characters, the number four is considered unlucky in Korea because it sounds like the word for death. (Note: "Four" and "death" have the same Hangul, 사, and are both pronounced the same, as “sa” (with a soft “s” sound). Their Hanja characters are different: (4 is 四 and death is 死). Similar to the western world's aversion to the number thirteen, building floors and hotel rooms often omit the number four.) Cha is very superstitious and will change hotel rooms if the room number has a four in it. The book is unusual in that it is a novel in English about life in modern Korea, whereas most English-language novels about Korea are historicial.

Publications Cha has written for include: The Atlantic, The Believer, and Yonhap News Agency. In addition to teaching at Columbia, she has also taught at Ewha Womans University and Yonsei University, both in Korea. As of 2025 she was living in Sleepy Hollow, New York with her husband and two daughters.

== Works ==
- Cha, Frances (2020). If I Had Your Face. New York City: Ballantine Books. ISBN 9780593129463.
- Cha, Frances (2023). The Goblin Twins. New York City: Crown Books for Young Readers. ISBN 9780593480236.
- Cha, Frances (2024). The Goblin Twins: Too Hard to Scare. New York City: Crown Books for Young Readers. ISBN 9780593480267.
