= The Last Painting of Sara de Vos =

2016 novel by Australian-American author Dominic Smith

- Author: Dominic Smith
- Language: English
- Genre: Literary novel
- Publisher: Sarah Crichton Books
- Publication date: May 2016
- Publication place: USA
- Media type: Print
- Pages: 384 pp.
- Awards: 2017 Indie Book Awards Book of the Year – Fiction, winner
- ISBN: 9780374106683

The Last Painting of Sara de Vos is a 2016 novel by the Australian-American author Dominic Smith.

It was the winner of the 2017 Indie Book Awards Book of the Year – Fiction.

== Synopsis ==
Sara de Vos, in 1631, was the first woman admitted as a master painter to the Guild of St. Luke's in Holland. Three hundred years after her death only one painting attributed to her remains. A young Australian painter is commissioned to paint a forgery of it and 50 years later discovers that the original and her forgery are to be both featured in an exhibition she is curating.

== Critical reception ==
Reviewing the novel for Australian Book Review Kerryn Goldsworthy found that "this beautiful novel is a gift. Even the most minor walk-on characters are brought to life in a few strokes; the three main characters are all vivid and intriguing".

The Kirkus Reviews reviewer noted: "This is a beautiful, patient, and timeless book, one that builds upon centuries and shows how the smallest choices—like the chosen mix for yellow paint—can be the definitive markings of an entire life."

== Awards ==
- 2017 Indie Book Awards Book of the Year – Fiction, winner

== Publication history ==
After the novel's initial publication in 2016 in USA by Sarah Crichton Books, it was reprinted as follows:

- Allen & Unwin, Australia, 2019

It was also translated into Dutch in 2016, German and Italian in 2017, and French and Polish in 2018.

== Notes ==
- Dominic Smith wrote about overlooked women painters of the Dutch Golden Age in an essay for The Paris Review.

== See also ==
- 2016 in Australian literature
