= Puerto del Sol =

- Discipline: Literature
- Language: English
- Edited by: Brandon Hobson

Publication details
- Publisher: Department of English, New Mexico State University (United States)
- Frequency: Biannually

Standard abbreviations
- ISO 4: Puerto Sol

Links
- Journal homepage

Puerto del Sol is a non-profit literary magazine run by faculty and graduate students from the MFA program in creative writing at New Mexico State University. It is based in Las Cruces, New Mexico and has been in circulation since 1960.

Puerto del Sol includes works of fiction, poetry, creative non-fiction, visual art and book reviews. As of Fall 2021, it has returned to publishing twice a year. Work from Puerto del Sol is considered for the Pushcart Prize, O. Henry Awards, Best American Short Stories, and other awards.

In addition to publishing established authors, Puerto del Sol also accepts work from up-and-coming writers. Past notable authors include David Foster Wallace, George Saunders, Pam Houston, Jenny Boully, and Rodrigo Toscano.

The editor-in-chief is MFA faculty member Brandon Hobson, and past editors include Kevin McIlvoy, Evan Lavender-Smith, Carmen Giménez Smith and Lily Hoang.

Puerto del Sol also hosts the digitally curated Black Voices Series edited by Naima Yael Tokunow and hosts an annual competition in both poetry and prose.
