= Julie Agoos =

American poet

- Born: 1956 (age 69–70); Boston
- Education: BA, Harvard University; MA from The Writing Seminars of The Johns Hopkins University
- Occupations: American poet; teacher in the English department and MFA program in poetry at Brooklyn College
- Writing career
- Notable works: Overnight, Ploughshares, Winter 1997-98; Man at the Piano, Ploughshares, Winter 1997-98; In a New Climate, Ploughshares, Winter 1984 [5]; Above the Land. Yale University Press. September 10, 1987.; Property. Ausable Press. May 1, 2008.
- Notable awards: 1989 poet in residence at The Frost Place in Franconia, NH; Tow Professorship Award, Brooklyn College. 2008; Creative Achievement Award, Brooklyn College. 2006; Towson State University Prize for Literature. 1988; Yale Series of Younger Poets Award. 1987; Briggs Literary Fellowship for one year of travel to Florence, Italy. Department of English, Harvard University. 1979; Grolier Poetry Prize, Grolier Book Shop, Cambridge, Massachusetts (Awards and Honors) 1979; Lloyd McKim Garrison Poetry Prize, Department of English, Harvard University. 1979

Julie Agoos (born 1956, in Boston) is an American poet.

== Life ==
Julie Agoos is the author of two previous collections of poetry, Above the Land (Yale University Press, 1987) and Calendar Year (The Sheep Meadow Press, 1996).

She received a BA from Harvard University, and an MA from The Writing Seminars of Johns Hopkins University. She was the 1989 poet in residence at The Frost Place in Franconia, NH.

Agoos taught for eight years as a lecturer in the creative writing program at Princeton University. She also taught in the English department and MFA program in poetry at Brooklyn College since 1994. She teaches courses that cover various subjects including Victorian Poetry, modern British & Irish Poetry, as well as special courses designed as tutorial courses in reading and writing.

Her area of expertise is in the dramatic and narrative modes of poetry, and in lyric strategies for the long poem. Agoos is also interested in exploring, in book form, the ways in which poems overlap and infiltrate each other to create a sustained form beyond the forms of individual lyrics.

She lives in Nyack, New York.

== Awards and achievements ==
- Robert Frost Place Residency Fellowship. 1989
- Tow Professorship Award, Brooklyn College. 2008
- Creative Achievement Award, Brooklyn College. 2006
- Towson State University Prize for Literature. 1988
- Yale Series of Younger Poets Award. 1987
- Briggs Literary Fellowship for one year of travel to Florence, Italy. Department of English, Harvard University. 1979
- Grolier Poetry Prize, Grolier Book Shop, Cambridge, Massachusetts (Awards and Honors) 1979
- Lloyd McKim Garrison Poetry Prize, Department of English, Harvard University. 1979

== Bibliography ==
Collections

- Above the Land. Yale University Press. September 10, 1987. ISBN 978-0-300-03861-3.
- Property. Ausable Press. May 1, 2008. ISBN 978-1-931337-37-3.

List of poems

Title	Year	First published	Reprinted/collected
Cold War Free Radio	2015	Agoos, Julie (May 25, 2015). "Cold War Free Radio". The New Yorker. Vol. 91, no. 14. p. 38.	
Primogeniture, poets.org			
Overnight, Ploughshares, Winter 1997-1998			
Man at the Piano, Ploughshares, Winter 1997-1998			
In a New Climate, Ploughshares, Winter 1984			
