= The Fourth River =

- Discipline: Literary magazine
- Language: English
- Edited by: Sheila Squillante

Publication details
- History: Spring 2005 to 2017; Fall 2014 to Present
- Publisher: Chatham University (USA)
- Frequency: Biannually (Spring, Fall)

Standard abbreviations
- ISO 4: Fourth River

Indexing
- ISSN: 1559-310X (print); 1559-3118 (web)
- LCCN: 2005216427
- OCLC no.: 62715594

Links
- Journal homepage

The Fourth River is an American literary magazine with a focus on nature and place-based writing.

== History and profile ==
Established in 2005 by the MFA Program in Creative Writing at Chatham University in Pittsburgh, Pennsylvania, the journal is edited by graduate students and Chatham faculty. Publication is annual as a quality paperback and twice monthly in its online format.

The Fourth River takes its name from a subterranean river beneath Pittsburgh, a city famously sited at the confluence of three rivers: Monongahela, Allegheny, and Ohio. The fourth river, unseen yet indispensable to the city's riverine ecosystem, is actually an aquifer geologists call the "Wisconsin Glacial Flow". Founding editor and poet Jeffrey Thomson wrote in first issue that the genesis of The Fourth River is the idea that “between and beneath the visible framework of the human world and the built environment, there exist deeper currents of force and meaning supporting the very structure of that world". The journal also takes inspiration from Rachel Carson, the biologist, zoologist, and nature writer who is one of Chatham's most notable alumnae.

== Staff ==
The editor-in-chief is Sheila Squillante, the fiction editor Marc Nieson and the nonfiction editor Heather McNaugher.

== Past contributors ==
Contributors to the journal include:

- Michael Byers
- Astrid Cabral
- Peter Cole
- Robert Hass
- Terrance Hayes
- Ted Kooser
- Phillip Lopate
- Dinty W. Moore
- Naomi Shihab Nye
- Claudia Rankine
- Janisse Ray
- Mary Swander
- Judith Vollmer
