= Christopher Gilbert =

American poet (1949–2007)

Christopher Gilbert (August 1, 1949, Birmingham, Alabama – July 5, 2007) was an American poet.

== Life ==
He was the son of Floyd and Rosie (Walker) Gilbert. He grew up in Lansing, Michigan.

He graduated from the University of Michigan in 1972, and PhD. in psychology from Clark University in 1986.

His work appears in African-American Literary Review, Callaloo, Crab Apple Review, Graham House Review, Indiana Review, Massachusetts Review, Ploughshares, Urbanus, William & Mary Review, and New York Quarterly.

His poem Any Good Throat, is on a monument in Jackson Square, Boston.

He lived in Providence, Rhode Island.

== Awards ==
- 1983 Walt Whitman Award
- 1986 The Frost Place poet in residence

== Works ==
=== Poetry ===
- Nikky Finney, ed. (2007). "Time with Stevie Wonder in It". The ringing ear. University of Georgia Press. ISBN 978-0-8203-2925-3.
- Across the Mutual Landscape. Graywolf Press. 1984. ISBN 978-0-915308-48-4.

=== Anthologies ===
- Arnold Rampersad, Hilary Herbold, ed. (2006). The Oxford anthology of African-American poetry. Oxford University Press. ISBN 978-0-19-512563-4.
- Fred Moramarco, Al Zolynas, ed. (1992). Men of Our Time: An Anthology of Male Poetry in Contemporary America. University of Georgia Press. p. 383. ISBN 978-0-8203-2394-7. "Christopher Gilbert poet."
- Sascha Feinstein, Yusef Komunyakaa, ed. (1991). The Jazz poetry anthology. Indiana University Press. ISBN 978-0-253-20637-4.
