= Lovelock Paiute Tribe of the Lovelock Indian Colony =

Lovelock Paiute Tribe
Küpadökadö (Northern Paiute)

Regions with significant populations
- United States (Nevada)

Languages
- Northern Paiute language, English

Related ethnic groups
- other Northern Paiute people

The Lovelock Paiute Tribe of the Lovelock Indian Colony (Northern Paiute: Küpadökadö) is a federally recognized tribe of Northern Paiute Indians in Pershing County, Nevada.

== Reservation ==
Location of the Lovelock Indian Colony

The Lovelock Paiute Tribe has a federal reservation, the Lovelock Indian Colony, at 40°10′26″N 118°29′00″W in Pershing County. The reservation was established in 1907 and is 20 acres (81,000 m^{2}). In 1990 80 tribal members lived on the reservation. In 1992, 110 people were enrolled in the tribe.

The tribe's headquarters is located in Lovelock, Nevada. Sandra Winap is the tribal chairperson of a five-person tribal council. There is also a tribal police force consisting of one police chief and two officers.

== Tribal history ==
Different bands of Northern Paiutes took the name of their principal food and those living in the area of present-day Lovelock called themselves Küpadökadö (Koop Ticutta), ground squirrel eaters. Other meats included jackrabbits, groundhogs, ducks, geese and fish. There were also plenty of wild vegetables and fruits to gather such as choke berries, pine nuts, wild onions, sweet potatoes, tule shoots and cane.

Mary Dave (born 1881) remembered being given bread and jam by the friendly founder of the town, George Lovelock, and also attending the school run by Sarah Winnemucca between 1885 and 1888. In 1891 the tribe executed the last suspected witch in the US, a Shoshone medicine woman named Winnescheika.

Soon after the reservation was established, another Indian school was created, of which there were photographs taken in 1911 and 1920. During the 1920s ethnographer Mark Raymond Harrington photographed tribal people in the area.

== Notable Lovelock Paiute ==
- Adrian C. Louis, author and educator
