= James Hoch (poet) =

American poet

- Born: July 9, 1967 (age 59); New Jersey, United States
- Education: Millersville University; University of Maryland
- Occupations: Poet, professor

James Hoch (born June 9, 1967) is an American poet.

== Biography ==
The son of a teacher-coach and a saleswoman, Hoch grew up in Collingswood, New Jersey, with three older siblings. Hoch studied philosophy at Millersville University and graduated from University of Maryland with an MFA in creative writing/poetry.

He has taught at Franklin and Marshall College and Lynchburg College. He now teaches in the Salameno School of Humanities and Global Studies at Ramapo College in New Jersey. Prior to teaching, Hoch worked as a dishwasher, dock worker, cook, social worker, and shepherd.

Hoch's poems have appeared in American Poetry Review, Virginia Quarterly Review, The Washington Post, Antioch, Slate, The Kenyon Review, The Gettysburg Review, Ninth Letter, Carolina Quarterly, The Virginia Quarterly Review, New England Review, Pleiades, Black Warrior Review, Gettysburg, Five Fingers, and The New Republic.

He was the 2008 The Frost Place Poet in residence.

== Personal life ==
Hoch has lived in Lancaster, Pennsylvania; Takoma Park, Maryland; Charlottesville, Virginia; Pittsburgh, Pennsylvania; Albuquerque, New Mexico; Collingswood, New Jersey and Nyack, New York. He now resides Garrison, NY, with his wife, younger son Owen and older son Aidan.

== Awards ==
- Bread Loaf Writers' Conference fellowships
- Sewanee Writers' Conference fellowships
- Summer Literary Seminars fellowships
- Pennsylvania Council on the Arts Individual Artists Fellowship, 2002
- National Endowment for the Arts Literature Fellowship, 2007
- The Frost Place Poet in residence, 2008
- Gerald Cable Award, for A Parade of Hands

== Bibliography ==
- Last Pawn Shop in New Jersey. LSU Press. 2022. ISBN 978-0807174050.
- Radio Static. Green Linden Press. 2021. ISBN 978-1-7371625-2-0.
- Miscreants. W.W. Norton. 2007. ISBN 978-0-393-06486-5.
- A Parade of Hands. Silverfish Review Press. 2003. ISBN 978-1-878851-19-2.
