= John Engels =

American poet (1931–2007)

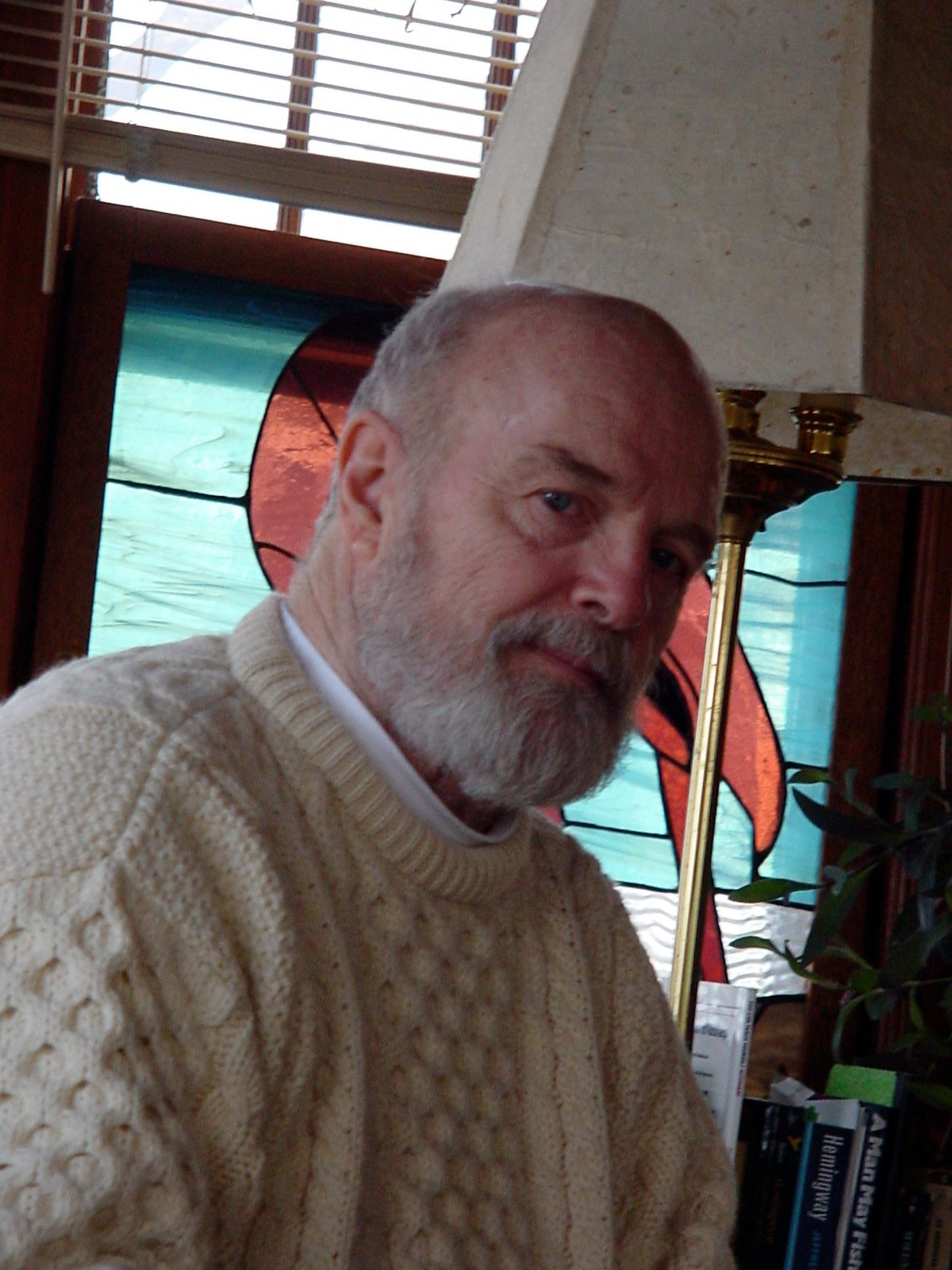
- Born: January 19, 1931; South Bend, Indiana, U.S.
- Died: June 13, 2007 (aged 76); Vermont, U.S.
- Education: University of Notre Dame; University College Dublin; Iowa Writers' Workshop (MFA)
- Occupation: Poet

John Engels (January 19, 1931 South Bend, Indiana – June 13, 2007 Vermont) was an American poet.

== Life ==
In 1952, John Engels graduated from the University of Notre Dame in English. After Navy service, he studied Anglo-Irish literature at the University College, Dublin, then graduated from the Iowa Writers' Workshop, with an M.F.A. in 1957. Engels taught at St. Norbert College, Saint Michael's College, Sweet Briar College, Randolph-Macon Woman's College, Middlebury College, Emory University, and the University of Alabama. In 1995, he was Wyndham Robertson Chair in Creative Writing at Hollins College.

Engels' work appeared in Harper's, the New Yorker, and many other prestigious journals.

== Awards ==
- 1976 — Frost Fellow at Bread Loaf Writers Conference
- 1979 — Guggenheim Fellowship
- 1986 — National Poetry Series, for Cardinals in the Ice Age
- 1988 — Poet in residence at The Frost Place

== Works ==
- "Adam After the Ice Storm", Poetry Foundation
- "Love Poem--Describing the Austere Comfort of the Dream in Which Nothing Is Named", Ploughshares, Spring 1977
- The Homer Mitchell place: poems. University of Pittsburgh Press. 1968.
- Blood Mountain. University of Pittsburgh Press. 1977. ISBN 978-0-8229-3289-5.
- Weather-fear: new and selected poems, 1958-1982. University of Georgia Press. 1983. ISBN 978-0-8203-0654-4.
- Cardinals in the Ice Age: poems. Graywolf Press. 1987. ISBN 978-0-915308-91-0.
- Big water: poems. Globe Pequot. 1995. ISBN 978-1-55821-358-6.
- Sinking creek: poems. Globe Pequot. 1998. ISBN 978-1-55821-638-9.
- House and garden. University of Notre Dame Press. 2001. ISBN 978-0-268-03056-8.
- Recounting the seasons: poems, 1958-2005. University of Notre Dame Press. 2006. ISBN 978-0-268-02770-4.
