= Heather McNaugher =

American poet

Heather McNaugher is an American poet.

She has been an associate professor of English and Creative Writing at Chatham University since 2006 and poetry editor of The Fourth River.

McNaugher has published poems in many literary magazines and earned her PhD at Binghamton University.

== Books ==
- Panic & Joy, poetry chapbook (Georgetown, KY: Finishing Line Press, 2008)
- System of Hideouts, poetry (Charlotte, NC: Main Street Rag Publishing Company, 2012)
- Double Life, poetry chapbook, (Night Ballet Press, 2014)
- Mixtape, collaborative poetry e-chapbook, (Blast Furnace, 2015)
