= Adrian C. Louis =

American writer (1946–2018)

- Born: April 24, 1946; Lovelock, Nevada, U.S.
- Died: September 9, 2018 (aged 72)
- Education: Brown University (MA)
- Occupation: Author
- Writing career
- Notable awards: Cohen Award (2001)
- Website: adrian-c-louis.com

Adrian C. Louis (April 24, 1946 – September 9, 2018) was an American author. Hailing from Nevada, Louis was a member of Lovelock Paiute tribe who lived on the Pine Ridge Reservation in South Dakota. He has taught at Oglala Lakota College.

His novel Skins (1995) discusses reservation life and issues such as poverty, alcoholism, and social problems and was the basis for the 2002 film, Skins. He also published books of poetry and a collection of short stories, Wild Indians and Other Creatures (1996). His work was noted for its realism.

He died on September 9, 2018.

== Biography ==
Born in Lovelock, Nevada, in 1946, Louis was the eldest of twelve children. Of mixed heritage, Louis was of Lovelock Paiute descent. In 1963 his first poem was published when he was a junior in high school. He moved from Nevada to South Dakota's Pine Ridge Reservation. Louis graduated from Brown University with a Bachelor's and MA in Creative Writing.

Louis worked as a journalist and was the editor of several newspapers, some of them tribal. In 1982, he became editor of Talking Leaf, a Los-Angeles-based Indian Newspaper. Later in the 1980s, he was publisher and managing editor of the Lakota Times (later renamed Indian Country Today). He was a co-founder of the Native American Journalists Association.

Louis has ten published books of poetry and two novels. His poetry and fiction have garnered him much recognition and awards. His work has been praised by notable Native American writers, including Sherman Alexie, N. Scott Momaday, James Welch and Leslie Marmon Silko. In 1999, he was added to the Nevada Writer's Hall of Fame.

In 2001 he was awarded the Writer of the Year by Wordcraft Circle of Native Writers and Storytellers and the Cohen Award for best published poem in Ploughshares. He is also the recipient of the Pushcart Prize as well as fellowships from the Bush Foundation, the South Dakota Arts Council, the Nebraska Arts Council, the National Endowment of the Arts and the Lila Wallace–Reader's Digest Foundation.

Louis taught English at Pine Ridge's Oglala Lakota College from 1984 to 1997; from 1999 to 2014, he taught in the Minnesota State University systems.

== Bibliography ==
=== Poetry ===
- The Indian Cheap Wine Seance, chapbook (1974, Grey Flannel Press)
- Muted War Drums (1977, Blue Cloud Quarterly)
- Sweets for the Dancing Bears (1979, Blue Cloud Quarterly)
- Fire Water World (1989, West End Press)
- Among the Dog Eaters (1992, West End Press)
- Blood Thirsty Savages (1994, Time Being Books)
- Days of Obsidian, Days of Grace: Selected Poetry and Prose by Four Native American Writers (1994. Bookman)
- Vortex of Indian Fevers (1995, TriQuarterly Books)
- Ceremonies of the Damned (1997, University of Nevada Press)
- Skull Dance, chapbook (1998, Bull Thistle)
- Ancient Acid Flashes Back (2000, University of Nevada Press)
- Bones & Juice (2001, TriQuarterly Books)
- Evil Corn (2004, Ellis Press)
- Deer Dreams (2006, Red Dragonfly Press)
- Logorrhea (2006, TriQuarterly Books)
- Savage Sunsets (2012, West End Press)
- Random Exorcisms (2016, LSU Press)
- The Bible of Adrian (2017, Bullhead Books)
- Electric Snakes (2018, The Backwaters Press/University of Nebraska Press)

Anthologies:

- Songs from This Earth on Turtle's Back, edited by Joseph Bruchac (1983, The Greenfield Review Press)

=== Prose ===
- Skins (1995, Crown)
- Wild Indians & Other Creatures (1996, University of Nevada Press)

=== Filmography ===
- Skins (2002) - screenplay
