= Jim Schley =

American poet

- Education: Dartmouth College (B.A.); Warren Wilson College (M.F.A.)
- Occupations: Poet; teacher; editor; theater artist
- Employer(s): Tupelo Press; Community College of Vermont
- Known for: Poetry; editing; sustainable-living publishing; work with Bread and Puppet Theater
- Notable work: As When, In Season (2008)
- Website: www.jimschley.com

Jim Schley is an American poet, teacher, editor, and theater artist. He is author of two poetry collections, most recently, As When, In Season (Marick Press, 2008), and has had his poems published in many literary journals and magazines including Ironwood, Crazyhorse, Rivendell, and Orion Magazine, in anthologies including Best American Spiritual Writing, and on The Writer’s Almanac with Garrison Keillor.

Schley was Co-Editor of the literary quarterly New England Review (1980–86), Production Editor at University Press of New England, and Managing Editor then Editor-in-Chief at the book publisher Chelsea Green, where he developed a line of "sustainable living" books about organic gardening and farming, renewable energy, and ecological building techniques. He is co-founder with Ann Aspell of Chapiteau Press, which publishes poetry chapbooks. He was executive director of The Frost Place museum and poetry center from 2006 to 2008. He has also toured extensively with theater companies including the world-renowned Bread and Puppet Theater, the Swiss ensemble Les Montreurs d'images, and the Flock Dance Troupe.

In 2004, following the unexpected loss of a job, he wrote a "My Turn" feature for Newsweek magazine about the experience of working numerous part-time jobs at once. It appeared in the September 20th, 2004 issue.

He is currently Managing Editor of Tupelo Press and teaches writing at the Community College of Vermont. He is a member of the National Book Critics Circle and an associate of the journalists' collective Homelands Productions.

Schley was born and raised in Wisconsin, and moved to New England in the 1970s to attend Dartmouth College, where he earned his B.A. He earned his M.F.A. from Warren Wilson College. He now lives with his wife Becky and daughter Lillian in a house they built in an off-the-grid cooperative in central Vermont. Jim and the house were featured in an article in the New York Times, June 19, 1999.

== Published works ==
Full-length Collections

- As When, In Season (Marick Press, 2008)

Chapbooks

- One Another (Chapiteau Press, 1999)
