= Kevin McIlvoy =

American writer and editor (1953–2022)

- Born: May 7, 1953; Madison, Illinois
- Died: September 30, 2022 (aged 69); Asheville, North Carolina
- Occupation: Writer
- Writing career
- Notable awards: New Mexico Governor’s Art Award

Kevin McIlvoy (1953–2022) was an American writer and the former Editor in Chief of the acclaimed literary magazine Puerto del Sol. His novels include A Waltz (1981), The Fifth Station (1987, 1989), Little Peg (1991), Hyssop (1998, 1999), At the Gate of All Wonder (2018), and One Kind Favor (2021.) His short stories, collected in The Complete History of New Mexico (2005) and 57 Octaves Below Middle C (2017), have appeared in such nationally acclaimed literary journals as The Southern Review, Ploughshares, TriQuarterly, Chelsea and The Paris Review. He taught as a Regents Professor in the English Department at New Mexico State University (1981–2008) and in the Creative Writing MFA program at Warren Wilson College (1987–2019.)
