= Sebastian Matthews =

American poet and writer (born 1965)

- Born: August 25, 1965 (age 61)
- Education: University of Michigan (MFA)
- Occupations: Poet; writer
- Parent(s): William Matthews; Marie Harris

Sebastian Matthews (born August 25, 1965) is an American poet and writer.

== Life ==
He graduated from the University of Michigan with an MFA.

His books include In My Father's Footsteps (memoir), We Generous (poetry), Miracle Day (poetry) and Beginner's Guide to a Head-on Collision (hybrid).

His father is William Matthews. His mother is Marie Harris.

He lives with his wife in Asheville, North Carolina.

== Awards ==
- Bernard De Voto Fellow in Nonfiction
- Vermont Studio Center residency.

== Works ==
- "Messages in a Bottle: Notes from an Unlikely Curator," an essay about curating an exhibition of collage artist Ray Johnson's work at Black Mountain College + Arts Museum, in Blackbird Fall 2010, v9n2
- "Barbershop Quartet, East Village Grille", American Life in Poetry
- "Song for My Father", Virginia Quarterly Review, Winter 2004
- "Buying Wine", Virginia Quarterly Review, Winter 2004
- "GHOST BOXES", La Petite Zine
- We Generous. Red Hen Press. 2007. ISBN 978-1-59709-087-2.
- Coming to Flood. Hollyridge Press. 2005. ISBN 978-0-9772298-0-2. (the Hollyridge Press Chapbook Series)

=== Memoir ===
- In My Father's Footsteps. W. W. Norton & Company. 2003. ISBN 978-0-393-05738-6. "Sebastian Matthews."

=== Editor ===
- Sebastian Matthews; Stanley Plumly, eds. (2004). Search Party: Collected Poems of William Matthews. Houghton Mifflin Harcourt. ISBN 978-0-618-35007-0.
