= Grace Dane Mazur =

American writer (born 1944)

- Born: April 22, 1944 (age 82); Boston, Massachusetts
- Occupation: Writer
- Spouse: Barry Mazur
- Writing career
- Period: Early - 1990s until present
- Genres: Fiction, short story, non-fiction
- Website: gracedanemazur.org

Grace Dane Mazur (born 1944) is an American writer. Her works include the novels Trespass (1998) and The Garden Party (2018), the short story collection Silk (1996), and Hinges (2010), a book that combines "personal essay, literary criticism, art history, and memoir."

== Biography ==
Initially pursuing a career in the biological sciences, Mazur earned a PhD in cellular and developmental biology from Harvard University in 1981, after which she spent a number of years as a postdoctoral fellow researching morphogenesis and micro-architecture in silkworms at Harvard's Biological Laboratories. In 1993, she earned a Master of Fine Arts in fiction from Warren Wilson College. Mazur worked as fiction editor at the Harvard Review from 1993 to 2004. She has taught creative writing at the Harvard Extension School and in the Master of Fine Arts program at Warren Wilson College. Her works have been reviewed in The New York Times, The Washington Post, the Los Angeles Times, and People, as well as on Vox. She is married to mathematician Barry Mazur, the Gerhard Gade University Professor and senior fellow at Harvard University.

== Selected works ==
=== Novels ===
- The Garden Party, Random House 2018 (ISBN 9780399179723)
- Trespass: A Novel, Nocturnum Press 1999 (ISBN 9781555973643)

=== Short-story collections ===
- Silk, Brookline Books 1996. (ISBN 9781571290281)

=== Nonfiction ===
- Hinges: Meditations on the Portals of the Imagination, CRC Press 2010. (ISBN 9781568817156)
