= Anna Solomon =

American novelist

Anna Solomon is an American novelist.

Prior to writing her first novel, she was a journalist for National Public Radio. She then received her MFA from the Iowa Writers Workshop. Her first book, the 2011 novel The Little Bride, is about the life of an orphaned, Jewish girl from the Russian Pale of settlement who goes to a South Dakota farm as a mail order bride.

Her second novel is Leaving Lucy Pear, a story about a baby that has been abandoned in a pear orchard.

She is the two time recipient of the Pushcart Prize and the recipient of the Missouri Review Editor's Prize.

Solomon was born and raised in Gloucester, Massachusetts and lives in Brooklyn, New York along with her two kids.

== Books ==
- The Little Bride (2011)
- Leaving Lucy Pear (2016)
- The Book of V. (2020)
