= Dominic Smith (author) =

American novelist (born 1971)

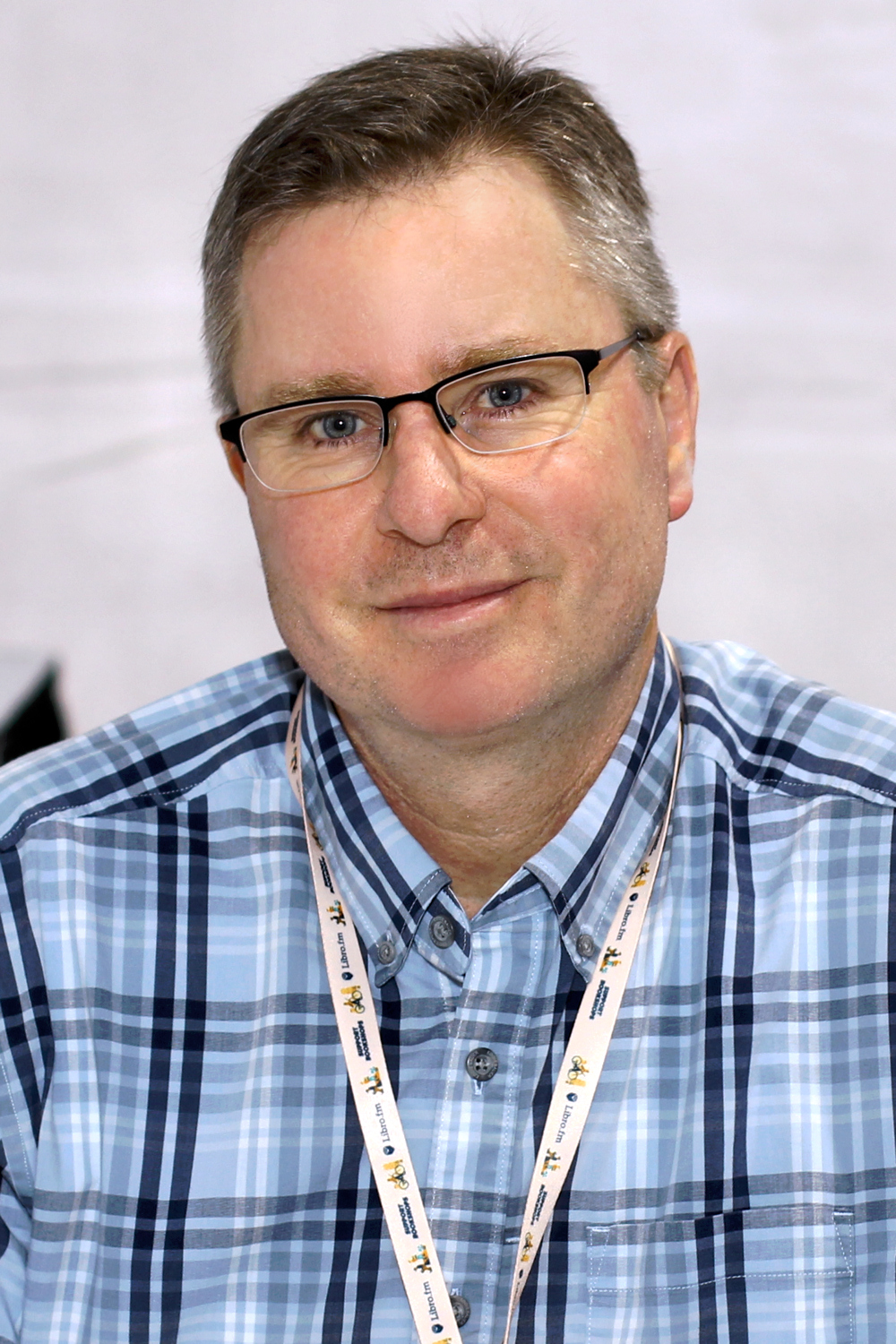
Smith at the 2023 Texas Book Festival

Dominic Smith (born 1971) is an Australian-American novelist.

== Early life and education ==
Smith was born in Brisbane, Australia in 1971. He grew up in the Blue Mountains and in Sydney. His father was an American corporate manager, his Australian mother worked as a secretary. Smith, one of four children, was eight years old when his parents separated. The following year, the family home burned down and Smith's mother suffered a stroke and became disabled; the family struggled to make ends meet. Australian politician Tamara Smith is his sister.

Smith graduated from college in 1994 at age 23 with a B.A. in anthropology. He completed an MFA in creative writing on a Michener Fellowship at the University of Texas at Austin in 2003.

He lives in Seattle, Washington with his wife, Emily, an instructional coach and early-childhood specialist. He has two daughters, Mikaila and Gemma. Smith has taught in the Warren Wilson MFA Program for Writers.

== Publications ==
Smith's writing has appeared in The New York Times, The Atlantic, Texas Monthly and The Australian. His novel The Last Painting of Sara de Vos was a New York Times bestseller.

== Novels ==
- Return to Valetto: A Novel (2023 Farrar, Straus, Giroux in USA; Allen & Unwin in Australia)
- The Electric Hotel: A Novel (Farrar, Straus, Giroux/Sarah Crichton Books, June 2019)
- The Last Painting of Sara de Vos (2016, Farrar, Straus, Giroux/Sarah Crichton Books in USA; Allen & Unwin in Australia)
- Bright and Distant Shores (Atria, 2011)
- The Beautiful Miscellaneous (Atria, 2007)
- The Mercury Visions of Louis Daguerre (Atria, 2006)

== Awards and Fellowships ==
- National Endowment for the Arts Literature Fellowship 2018
- Australia Council for the Arts New Works Grant
- Dobie Paisano Fellowship
