= Doreen Gildroy =

American poet

- Education: University of Illinois (BA); Warren Wilson College (MFA)
- Occupation: Poet
- Spouse: Michael Ryan
- Children: 1
- Writing career
- Notable awards: John C. Zacharis First Book Award (2002)

Doreen Gildroy is an American poet.

== Life ==
She graduated from the University of Illinois with a B.A. and Warren Wilson College with an M.F.A. Her work has appeared in The American Poetry Review, The Antioch Review, The Colorado Review, The Marlboro Review, TriQuarterly, The Virginia Quarterly Review, and Volt.

She lives in California with her husband, poet Michael Ryan, and their daughter, Emily.

== Awards ==
- 2002 John C. Zacharis First Book Award
- Bread Loaf Writers' Conference Robert Frost Fellow in Poetry

== Works ==
- "How She Moves Her Hand", American Poetry Review, Vol. 36 No. 3
- American Poetry Review, Vol. 33 No. 5
- "What I Looked at Today ", Ploughshares, Winter 1998-99
- "Winds", Ploughshares, Winter 1998-99
- "Viva Vox", Ploughshares, Winter 2005-06
- "Human Love", Slate, Sept. 27, 2005
- The little field of self. University of Chicago Press. 2002. ISBN 978-0-226-29329-5. "Doreen Gildroy."
- Human love. University of Chicago Press. 2005. ISBN 978-0-226-29330-1.
