= Ruth Currie-McDaniel =

American historian

- Born: Ruth Douglas Currie

Academic background
- Education: Duke University
- Thesis: Georgia carpetbagger: John Emory Bryant and the first phases of Reconstruction (1971)

Academic work
- Institutions: Appalachian State University
- Main interests: Reconstruction Era

Ruth Currie-McDaniel, formerly Ruth Douglas Currie, is a professor and historian of Reconstruction Era history in the United States. She attended Warren Wilson College in Swannanoa, North Carolina. She is professor emerita at Appalachian State University's history department and was a historian for the U.S. Army Strategic Defense Command for four years. She retired as professor of history and political science at Warren Wilson College in Asheville, North Carolina. She has written books about John Emory Bryant, his wife Emma Spaulding Bryant, and American policy in the Pacific theater including Kwajalein Atoll and the Marshall Islands.

She married Kenneth B. Orr (now deceased) who served as president of Presbyterian College.

== Work ==
Currie-McDaniel's 1987 book about John Emory Bryant, Carpetbagger of Conscience describes a "typical" carpetbagger. The Journal of American History writes that the "treatment of her subject is much more shaded and ambivalent than the title suggests." The Georgia Historical Quarterly writes that her treatment of Bryant stands "somewhere near the boundary between the rehabilitationist and what we might label the "post-rehabilitationist" schools of Reconstruction historiography." The North Carolina Historical Review wrote, "This book should be considered the standard biography of John Emory Bryant."

Currie-McDaniel's book, Emma Spaulding Bryant: Civil War Bride, Carpetbagger's Wife, Ardent Feminist - Letters and Diaries 1860-1900 (2004) describes the life of Emma Spaulding Bryant apart from her husband, John Emory Bryant. The Journal of Southern History wrote "this volume serves as a unique resource for students of women, race, Reconstruction, and gender relations."

== Bibliography ==
- Carpetbagger of conscience: a biography of John Emory Bryant, by Ruth Currie-McDaniel (Fordham University Press, 1999, ISBN 978-0823219377, ISBN 0823219372; also University of Georgia Press, 1987)
- Emma Spaulding Bryant: Civil War Bride, Carpetbagger's Wife, Ardent Feminist : Letters and Diaries, 1860-1900, compiled by Ruth Douglas Currie (Fordham Univ Press, 2004, ISBN 978-0823222742, ISBN 0823222748)
- Kwajalein Atoll, the Marshall Islands and American Policy in the Pacific (McFarland, October 17, 2016, ISBN 978-1476663111, ISBN 1476663114)
- Appalachian State University: The First Hundred Years (with Jack Mellott, Mike Rominger, and Charles Shoffner, Harmony House, 1998, ISBN 978-1564690456)
