= Daisy Fried =

American poet (born 1967)

- Born: 1967 (age 58–59); Ithaca, New York, U.S.
- Education: Swarthmore College
- Occupation: Poet
- Writing career
- Subject: Poetry

Daisy Fried (born 1967, Ithaca, New York) is an American poet.

== Life ==
Fried graduated from Swarthmore College in 1989.

Her work has appeared in The London Review of Books, The Nation, Poetry, The New Republic, American Poetry Review, Antioch Review, Threepenny Review, Triquarterly.

She teaches creative writing in the Warren Wilson College MFA Program for Writers, and has taught creative writing as the Grace Hazard Conkling Poet-in-Residence at Smith College, at Haverford College, Bryn Mawr College, Villanova University, Temple University, University of Pennsylvania, the low-residency MFA program at Warren Wilson College and the Fine Arts Work Center in Provincetown. She has written prose about poetry for Poetry, The New York Times and The Threepenny Review and has been a blogger for Harriet, the blog of the Poetry Foundation.

She lives with her husband, Jim Quinn, a writer (not the radio talk show host), and their daughter, in Philadelphia.

== Awards ==
- 1998 Pew Fellowships in the Arts
- 1999 Agnes Lynch Starrett Poetry Prize, for She Didn't Mean to Do It
- 2004 Hodder Fellowship from Princeton University
- 2005 Cohen Award from Ploughshares for "Shooting Kinesha"
- 2006 Guggenheim Fellow
- 2007 Finalist for the National Book Critics Circle Awards for My Brother is Getting Arrested Again
- 2009 Poetry magazine Editor's Prize for best feature article in the past year for "Sing God-Awful Muse"
- Pushcart Prize
- Pennsylvania Council on the Arts Fellowship

== Works ==
Books

- She Didn't Mean to Do It. University of Pittsburgh Press. 2000. ISBN 0-8229-5738-8.
- My Brother is Getting Arrested Again. University of Pittsburgh Press. 2006. ISBN 978-0-8229-5919-9.
- Women's Poetry: Poems and Advice. University of Pittsburgh Press. 2013. ISBN 978-0-8229-6238-0.

Poems Online

- "Doll Ritual; Shooting Kinesha; Better Read, A Valentine; Stealing From Lehigh Dairy & My Brother Is Getting Arrested Again". Poetry magazine. Spring 2006. Archived from the original on July 15, 2011.
- "Women's Poetry". The Nation. June 3, 2009.
- "Attenti agli Zingari". American Poetry Review. 38 (6). December 2009. Archived from the original on February 3, 2014.
- "Torment". Poetry. March 2011 – via Poetry Foundation.

=== Anthologies ===
- Collins, Billy, ed. (2003). Poetry 180: a turning back to poetry. Random House Trade Paperbacks. ISBN 978-0-8129-6887-3.
- Coghill, Sheila; Tammaro, Thom, eds. (2003). Visiting Walt: poems inspired by the life & work of Walt Whitman. University of Iowa Press. ISBN 978-0-87745-854-8.
- Ochester, Ed, ed. (2007). American poetry now: Pitt poetry series anthology. University of Pittsburgh Press. ISBN 978-0-8229-4310-5.
- Schwepcke, Barbara Haus; Swainson, Bill, eds. (2019). A New Divan: A Lyrical Dialogue Between East and West. Gingko Library. ISBN 978-1-90994-228-8. (Translator)

=== Essays ===
- "Poetry on the Web". Poetry. May 2005 – via Poetry Foundation.
- "Who Needs to Hear A Quagga's Voice?". Poetry. January 2009 – via Poetry Foundation.
- "Prufrock Moment". Harriet Books. February 5, 2009 – via Poetry Foundation.
- "Sing, God-awful Muse!". Poetry. August 2009 – via Poetry Foundation.
