= Patrick Donnelly (poet) =

American poet (born 1956)

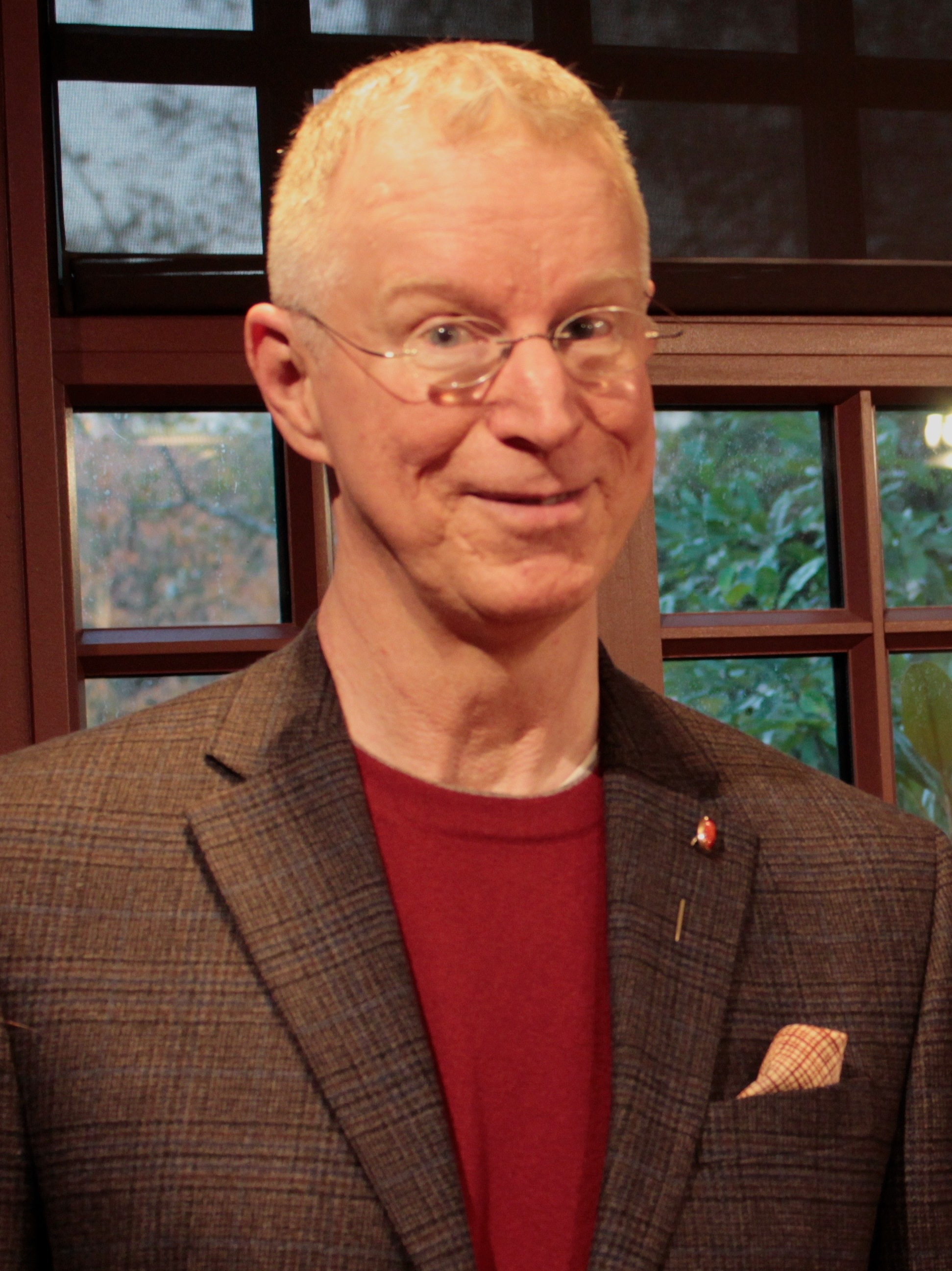
- Donnelly in 2019
- Born: 25 September 1956 (age 70); Tucson, Arizona
- Occupations: Poet, associate editor, professor
- Writing career
- Period: 2003-
- Notable works: The Charge; Nocturnes of the Brothel of Ruin
- Notable awards: Lambda Literary Award (2013 finalist); The Publishing Triangle Award for Gay Male Poetry (2004 finalist); U.S./Japan Creative Artists Program Award; 2015-2016 Japan-U.S. Friendship Commission Prize for the Translation of Japanese Literature

Patrick Donnelly (born September 25, 1956 in Tucson, Arizona) is an American poet. He is the author of first poetry collections, The Charge (Ausable Press, 2003, which in 2009 became part of Copper Canyon Press) Nocturnes of the Brothel of Ruin (Four Way Books, 2012), Jesus Said (a chapbook from Orison Books, 2017), Little-Known Operas (Four Way Books, 2019) and Willow Hammer (Four Way Books, 2025) . His poems have appeared in many journals, including The American Poetry Review, The Yale Review, The Virginia Quarterly Review, The Massachusetts Review, Ploughshares, Hayden's Ferry Review, and Slate, and in anthologies including The Book of Irish American Poetry from the 18th Century to the Present (University of Notre Dame Press, 2007), and From the Fishouse: An Anthology of Poems that Sing, Rhyme, Resound, Syncopate, Alliterate, and Just Plain Sound Great (Persea Press, 2009).

Though not of any specific religion, his poetry often takes on subjects such as erotic love or the AIDS epidemic in religious terms. Writing in 88: A Journal of Contemporary Poetry, Lee Rossi said of Donnelly's work: "Donnelly's greatest strength may be his control of the pitch and inflection of his poems. We see it not just in the let's-go-to-bed poems, but also in the poems of suffering and loss...The poet is not just some rueful roué, but something more complicated and human. Caught between God and God's creation, he is the anchorite who never completely turns his back on this world, the angelic sybarite who never quite quits his conversation with God."^{[1]}

Since 2024, Donnelly has served as Program Director for The Frost Place in Franconia, New Hampshire, and also directed the Poetry Seminar at The Frost Place. ^{[2]} He is currently an associate editor of Poetry International and a contributing editor of Trans-Portal, and from 1999 to 2009 he was an associate editor at Four Way Books. He received his MFA from the Warren Wilson College MFA Program for Writers, and has taught at Smith College, Colby College, the Lesley University MFA in Creative Writing Program, and Lynchburg College. Donnelly's awards include a U.S./Japan Creative Artists Program Award, an Artist Fellowship from the Massachusetts Cultural Council, the Margaret Bridgman Fellowship in Poetry from the Bread Loaf Writers' Conference, and a 2018 Amy Clampitt Residency Award.

With his spouse Stephen D. Miller, Donnelly translated classical Japanese poems in The Wind from Vulture Peak: the Buddhification of Japanese Waka in the Heian Period (Cornell East Asia Series, 2012). The Vulture Peak translations were awarded the 2015-2016 Japan-U.S. Friendship Commission Prize for the Translation of Japanese Literature, from the Donald Keene Center of Japanese Culture at Columbia University. Donnelly's translations with Miller have appeared in many journals, including Bateau, Circumference, eXchanges, Inquiring Mind, Metamorphoses, New Plains Review, and Poetry International.^{[4]}

Donnelly was the 2015 – 2017 Poet Laureate of Northampton, Massachusetts.

== Works ==
- The Charge. Ausable Press (since 2009 part of Copper Canyon Press). 2003.
- Nocturnes of the Brothel of Ruin. Four Way Books. 2012.
- Jesus Said. Orison Books. 2017.
- Little-Known Operas. Four Way Books. 2019.
- Willow Hammer. Four Way Books. 2025.
