= Cleopatra Mathis =

American poet (born 1947)

Cleopatra Mathis (born 1947 in Ruston, Louisiana) is an American poet who since 1982 has been the Frederick Sessions Beebe Professor in the English department at Dartmouth College, where she is also director of the Creative Writing Program. Her most recent book is White Sea (Sarabande Books, 2005). She is a faculty member at The Frost Place Poetry Seminar.

== Life ==
Born in Ruston, Mathis was raised by her Greek mother’s family, including her grandfather, who spoke no English, and her grandmother, who ran the family café. Her father left when she was six years old. Mathis received her bachelor's degree from Southwest Texas State University in 1970, and spent seven years teaching public high school. During this time, Mathis became interested in poetry, and she earned her M.F.A. from Columbia University, graduating in 1978. Writer and professor Frances Cha sites her as a significant influence.

== Career ==
Her first five books of poems were published by Sheep Meadow Press, and are distributed by University Press of New England. Her fifth book (What to Tip the Boatman?) won the Jane Kenyon Award for Outstanding Book of Poems in 2001. Prizes and honors for her work include two National Endowment for the Arts grants, in 1984 and 2003; the Peter Lavin Award for Younger Poets from the Academy of American Poets; two Pushcart Prizes, 1980 and 2006; a poetry residency at The Frost Place in 1982; a 1981-82 Fellowship in Poetry at the Fine Arts Work Center in Provincetown, Massachusetts, and fellowship residencies at Yaddo and the MacDowell Colony; The May Sarton Award; and Individual Artist Fellowships in Poetry from both the New Hampshire State Council on the Arts and the New Jersey State Arts Council.

Cleopatra Mathis' work has appeared widely in magazines and journals, including The New Yorker, Poetry, The American Poetry Review, Tri-Quarterly, The Southern Review, The Georgia Review, AGNI, and in textbooks and anthologies including The Made Thing: An Anthology of Contemporary Southern Poetry (University of Arkansas Press, 1999), The Extraordinary Tide: Poetry by American Women (Columbia University Press, 2001), and The Practice of Poetry (HarperCollins, 1991).

== Published works ==
- After the Body: New & Selected Poems (Sarabande Books, 2020) ISBN 9781946448613
- Book of Dog (Sarabande Books, 2012) ISBN 9781936747474
- White Sea (Sarabande Books, 2005) ISBN 9781932511161
- What to Tip the Boatman? (Sheep Meadow Press, 2001) ISBN 9781878818973
- Guardian (Sheep Meadow Press, 1995) ISBN 9781878818416
- The Center for Cold Weather (Sheep Meadow Press, 1989)
- The Bottom Land (Sheep Meadow Press, 1983)
- Aerial View of Louisiana (Sheep Meadow Press, 1979) ISBN 9780935296013
