= Vita Kari =

American multimedia artist (born 1994)

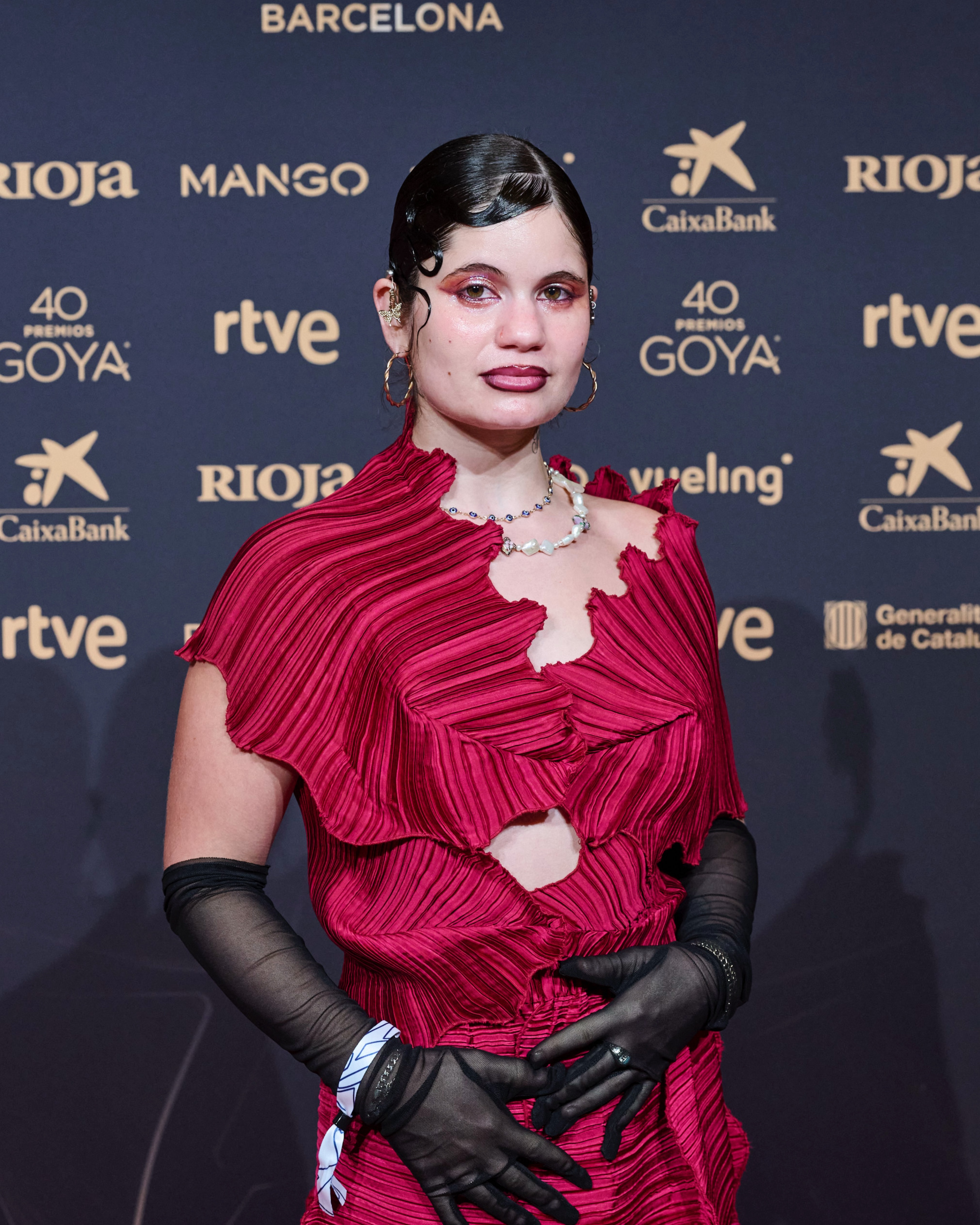
- Vita Kari at the 40th Goya Awards (2026)
- Born: November 11, 1994 (age 32); Los Angeles, California, U.S.
- Education: Warren Wilson College (BA), Otis College of Art and Design (MFA)
- Occupations: Social media personality, visual artist
- Known for: Performance art, video art, sculpture, textile art
- Website: vitakari.com

Vita Kari (born November 11, 1994) is an American visual artist and social media personality. They work across performance art, video art, and textiles. Kari is non-binary and explore different media for art creation such as sculptural works, performances, and videos which analyze the boundaries between online visual art and physical artistic presentation.

== Biography ==
Vita Kari was born on November 11, 1994, in Los Angeles, California. They attended the Otis College of Art and Design's pre-college summer of art program in Los Angeles. Kari is Middle Eastern and Jewish, non-binary, and uses the pronouns they/them.

Kari received a bachelor's degree in 2018 in art from Warren Wilson College in Swannanoa, North Carolina; and MFA degree in 2024 from Otis College of Art and Design.

== Notable works ==
Kari started to use social media as an art practice in 2022, they are best known for their TikTok account. From 2020–2022, Kari created and operated a space for queer artists called Vitawood.

"Billboard Prenup: A Byte of Love" is a performance art piece Kari finished when they were attending the MFA program. The idea is that they are married with their online visual identity, the art cooperates performance, tapestries, and sculptures.

Their performative art work titled "Burger As Body" for New York Fashion Week in 2024, was inspired by their grandmother's eating a burger upon first arriving in the United States.

Kari has worked with fashion brands including Warby Parker and Levi's.

"Virality as Form: The Craziest Thing About Being Creative" is a series which Kari makes videos to study the connections between attentions being paid to online social media and the cost of personal identities. These videos reflects the ideology formed by public mass, and the idea that Virality is art media.

In 2024, Kari was designed tapestries, and used classical Moroccan patterns, architectural design, and online elements to inform the work. BlackBerry phones and selfies were also sources of inspirations for the tapestries.
