= Tarfia Faizullah =

Bengali American poet

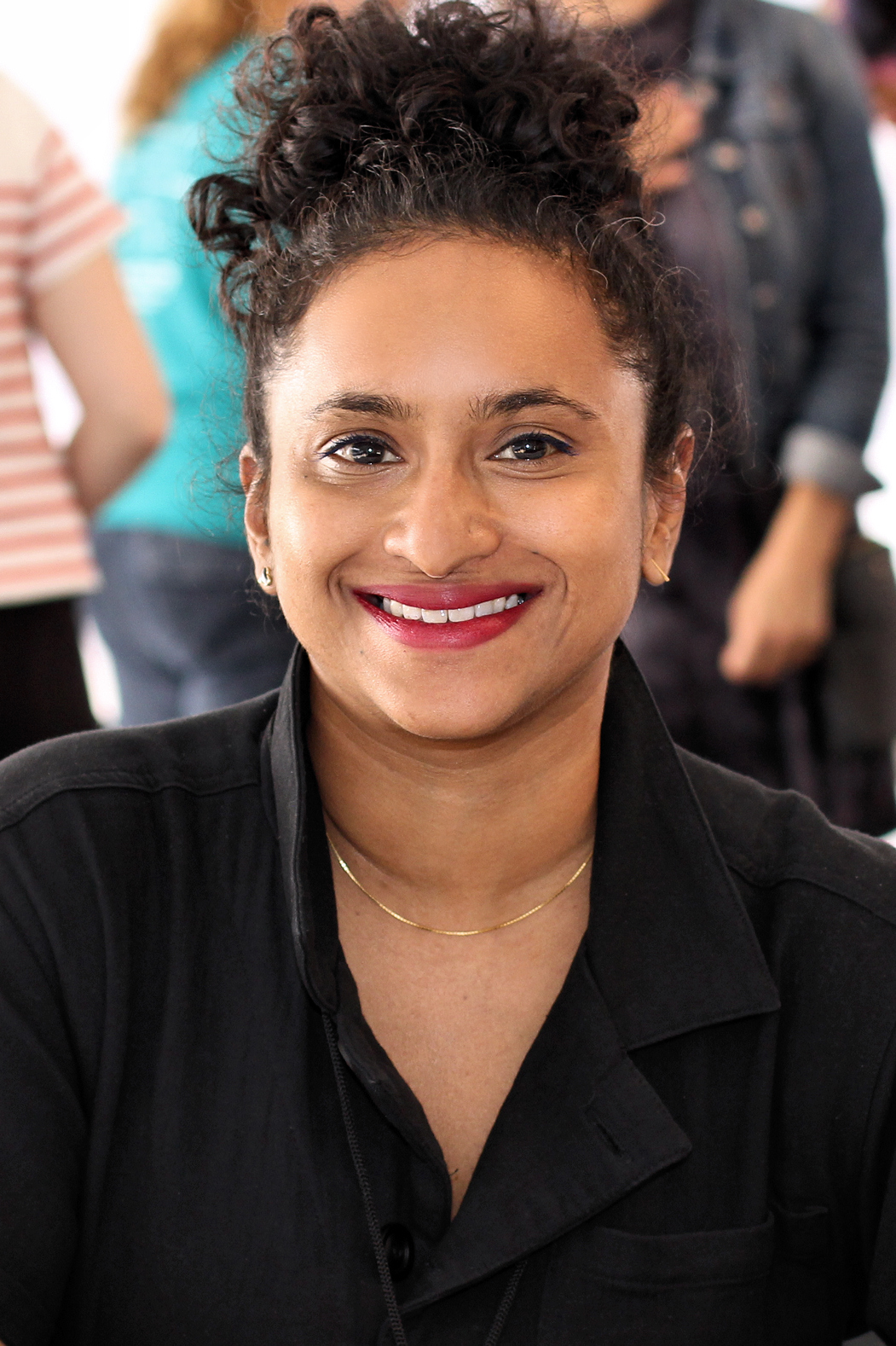
- Faizullah at the 2018 Texas Book Festival
- Born: 1980 (age 45–46); Brooklyn, New York City
- Education: Virginia Commonwealth University
- Writing career
- Language: English
- Genre: Poetry
- Website: www.tfaizullah.com

Tarfia Faizullah is a Bangladeshi American poet. Born in 1980 in Brooklyn, New York, she was raised in West Texas. In 2010 she traveled to Bangladesh to interview survivors of rape by Pakistani soldiers during the 1971 Liberation War, who were officially known as the birangona. Seam (SIU, 2014), her first book, was a collection of poems inspired by the many interviews she had with the birangona; it won the Crab Orchard Series in Poetry Open Competition Awards Her writing has also appeared widely in media across the US and abroad and in many journalistic media such as BuzzFeed. In 2016, Harvard Law School included Faizullah in their list of 50 Women Inspiring Change

== Life ==
Tarfia Faizullah is a Bengali American poet. Born in 1980 in Brooklyn, New York City; she was raised in Midland, Texas. She earned an MFA from the Virginia Commonwealth University program in creative writing. In 2006, after attending a poetry panel at the University of Texas at Austin which featured the Bengali author Mahmud Rahman. He had translated an excerpt of a novel, Talaash, by a writer named Shaheen Akhtar, which described the life of a woman who had been raped by Pakistani soldiers during the 1971 Liberation War. This historical event inspired her to begin researching the women affected by it. After applying and receiving a Fulbright scholarship, she traveled to Dhaka, Bangladesh, in 2010 to interview survivors of these atrocities, whom the Bengali government has dubbed birangona. Seam (SIU, 2014), her first book, was a collection of poems that were inspired by the many interviews she had with the birangona. Her second book, Registers of Illuminated Villages (Graywolf Press, 2018), was in development for 15 years and discusses many personal themes; it interrogates questions of memory, faith and locations beyond Bangladesh. Until 2019 she served at the University of Michigan's Helen Zell Writers’ Program as the Nicholas Delbanco Visiting Professor in Poetry.

== Works ==
- Seam, Southern Illinois University Press, 2014, ISBN 9780809333257
- Registers of Illuminated Villages: Poems, Gray Wolf Press, 2018, ISBN 9781555978006

In Anthology

- Ghost Fishing: An Eco-Justice Poetry Anthology, University of Georgia Press, 2018, ISBN 9780820353159
- Halal If You Hear Me Haymarket, 2019, ISBN 9781608466047

== Awards ==
- Associated Writers Program Intro Journals Award
- Dorothy Sargent Rosenberg Prize
- Copper Nickel Poetry Contest (2012)
- Bread Loaf Writers’ Conference Margaret Bridgman Scholarship in Poetry
- Sewanee Writers’ Conference scholarship
- Fulbright fellowship
- Three Pushcart Prizes
- 'Ploughshares’ Cohen Award.
- Crab Orchard Series in Poetry Open Competition Awards
