= William Matthews (poet) =

American poet

- Born: William Procter Matthews III; November 11, 1942; Cincinnati, Ohio
- Died: November 12, 1997 (aged 55); New York
- Education: Yale University (BA); University of North Carolina, Chapel Hill (MA)
- Children: 2
- Writing career
- Genre: Poetry
- Notable works: Time & Money; Search Party: Collected Poems; After All: Last Poems
- Notable awards: Fellowships from the Guggenheim Foundation, and the National Endowment for the Arts; Poet in residence at The Frost Place in Franconia, New Hampshire (1980); Ruth Lilly Poetry Prize (1997); National Book Critics Circle Award for Time & Money (1996); Lenore Marshall Poetry Prize finalist

William Procter Matthews III (November 11, 1942 – November 12, 1997) was an American poet and essayist.

== Life ==
Born and raised in Cincinnati, Ohio, Matthews attended Berkshire School and later earned a bachelor's degree from Yale University as well as a master's from the University of North Carolina at Chapel Hill.

In addition to serving as a Writer-in-Residence at Boston's Emerson College, Matthews held various academic positions at institutions including Cornell University, the University of Washington at Seattle, the University of Colorado at Boulder, and the University of Iowa. He served as president of Associated Writing Programs and of the Poetry Society of America. At the time of his death he was a professor of English and director of the creative writing program at City College of New York. A reading series has been named for him at City College of New York. His sons are Sebastian Matthews and Bill Matthews.

== Awards ==
During his 27 years as an author, Matthews received fellowships from the Guggenheim Foundation, and the National Endowment for the Arts. In 1980, Matthews was the poet in residence at The Frost Place in Franconia, New Hampshire, and in 1997 he was a recipient of the Ruth Lilly Poetry Prize.

== Works ==
Matthews published 11 books of poetry, including Time & Money which won the National Book Critics Circle Award in 1996 and was a Lenore Marshall Poetry Prize finalist. Two posthumous collections have been released: Search Party: Collected Poems and After All: Last Poems. Frequent subjects in his writing are the early years of professional basketball and historical Jazz figures.

Matthews believed that poetry should have subject matter, so as to provide the substance needed for the art to fulfill its function.

== Bibliography ==
- The Parataxic Mode: Concerning Defoe's Use of Irony in Moll Flanders (1966, MA Thesis, UNC)
- Broken Syllables (pamphlet, 1969)
- Ruining the New Road (1970)
- The Cloud (1971)
- Matthews' Compleat Palmistry (1971)
- Sleek for the Long Flight: New Poems (1972)
- Sticks and Stones (1975)
- Rising and Falling (1979)
- Flood (1982)
- Good (1983)
- A Happy Childhood (1984)
- Foreseeable Futures (1987)
- Sleek For the Long Flight (1988)
- Blues if You Want (1989)
- Curiosities (Poets on Poetry) (essays, 1989)
- Selected Poems and Translations, 1969-1991 (1992)
- The Mortal City: 100 Epigrams of Martial (translator/editor, 1995)
- Time & Money: New Poems (1996)
- After All: Last Poems (1998)
- The Poetry Blues: Essays and Interviews (ed. Stanley Plumley, 2001)
- The Satires of Horace (editor/translator, 2002)
- Sebastian Matthews; Stanley Plumly, eds. (2004). Search Party: Collected Poems of William Matthews. Houghton Mifflin Harcourt. ISBN 978-0-618-35007-0.
- Sebastian Matthews; Stanley Plumly, eds. (2010). New Hope for the Dead. Red Hen Press. ISBN 978-1-59709-162-6
