= The Frost Place =

Historic house in New Hampshire, United States

- Frost Place
- U.S. National Register of Historic Places
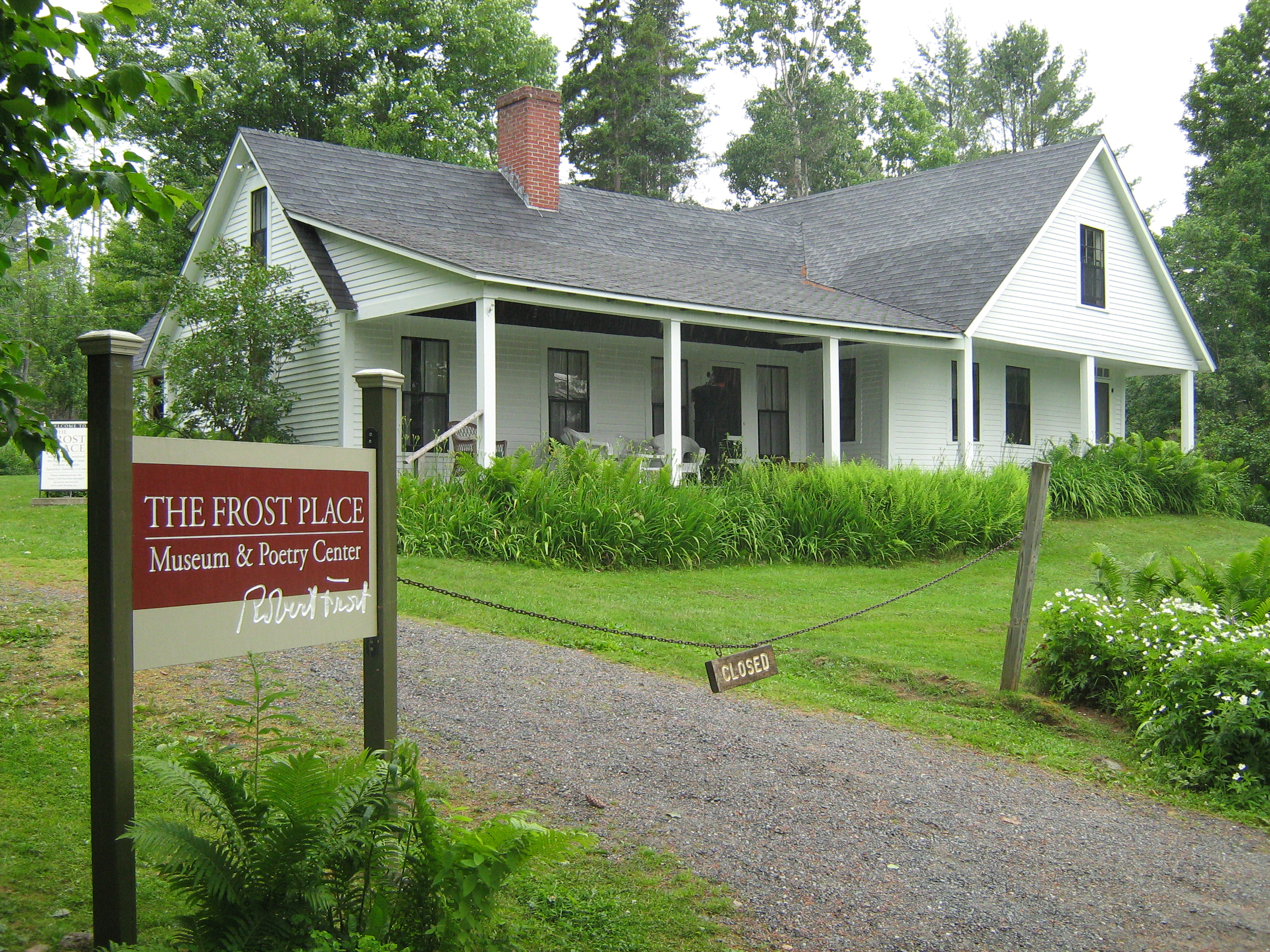
- The Frost Place in 2008

- Location within New Hampshire Location within the United States
- Interactive map showing the location of the Frost Place
- Location: Ridge Road; Franconia, New Hampshire, United States
- Coordinates: 44°12′46″N 71°45′27″W
- Area: 9 acres (3.6 ha)
- NRHP reference No.: 76000126
- Added to NRHP: November 30, 1976

The Frost Place is a museum and nonprofit educational center for poetry located at Robert Frost's former home on Ridge Road in Franconia, New Hampshire, United States. The property was listed on the National Register of Historic Places in 1976.

== History ==
According to local family lore, poet Robert Frost spotted this property on the west side of Franconia's Ridge Road in 1915 while looking for a home in the area. He purchased it from farmer Willis Herbert, who reportedly moved into his cousin's empty house down the road. The house is 1½ stories in height, with a long front facade covered by a porch. The facade affords fine views of the Franconia Range and Mount Lafayette.

Frost and his family lived in the house until 1920. It remained a private residence until The Frost Place was founded in 1976 when the farm was purchased by the town of Franconia, restored, and given its name, opening as a museum in 1977. Since 1977, the Frost Place has awarded a resident poet award to an emerging American poet, which includes a stipend and the opportunity to live and write in the house during the summer.

From 2013 until 2022, The Frost Place offered an annual chapbook prize, with the winning chapbook published by Bull City Press. Past winners include Jill Osier, Lisa Gluskin Stonestreet, Anders Carlson-Wee, Tiana Clark, Yuki Tanaka, Cassandra Bruner, Aa Hee Lee, and Ethan Chua.

== Conferences ==
In 2024, The Frost Place hired poet Patrick Donnelly to lead as Program Director. He continues to direct the annual Poetry Seminar. For many years, The Frost Place sponsored a Conference on Poetry, and a Conference on Poetry and Teaching. The Conference on Poetry was directed by poet Gabrielle Calvocoressi, with poet Ross White serving as Associate Director. The Conference on Poetry and Teaching and the Writing Intensive was directed by poet Dawn Potter; associate director was poet and teacher Kerrin McCadden.

== Management ==
A board of trustees assumed responsibility for the management of the museum and associated programs, and Donald Sheehan served as executive director until 2005. In 2006, the trustees appointed Jim Schley to be Sheehan's successor. From the fall of 2008 until April 2011 the trustees managed The Frost Place. Maudelle Driskell was named executive director in April 2011 and served until 2023, when Stacy Holmes was hired as Interim Executive Director in the fall of that year. In 2024, Stacy Holmes was appointed Executive Director. Friends of the Frost Place is the nonprofit organization that manages The Frost Place house-museum and its programs.

== Resident poets ==
Year	Poet
1977	Katha Pollitt
1978	Robert Hass
1979	Gary Miranda
1980	William Matthews
1981	Mary Jo Salter
1982	Cleopatra Mathis
1983	Denis Johnson
1984	Sherod Santos
1985	Kathy Fagan
1986	Christopher Gilbert
1987	Pattiann Rogers
1988	John Engels
1989	Julie Agoo
1990	Rosanna Warren
1991	Stanley Plumly
1992	Robert Cording
1993	Sharon Bryan
1994	Mark Halliday
1995	Luci Tapahonso
1996	David Graham
1997	Jeffrey Skinner
1998	Sue Ellen Thompson
1999	Mary Ruefle
2000	Mark Cox
2001	B. H. Fairchild
2002	Gray Jacobik
2003	Adrienne Su
2004	Major Jackson
2005	Laura Kasischke
2006	Robert Farnsworth
2007	Jody Gladding
2008	James Hoch
2009	Rigoberto González
2010	Adam Halbur
2011	K. A. Hays
2012	Paula Bohince
2013	Nicole Terez Dutton
2014	Rebecca Foust
2015	Todd Hearon
2016	Rose McLarney
2017	Christina Hutchins
2018	Nicole Homer
2019	Matthew Minicucci
2023	Jessica Jacobs
2024	Aurielle Marie
2025	Nathan Xavier Osorio
2026	Adam Giannelli

== See also ==
- Robert Frost Farm (Derry, New Hampshire)
- Robert Frost Farm (Ripton, Vermont)
- Robert Frost Farm (South Shaftsbury, Vermont)
- Robert Frost House, Cambridge, Massachusetts
- Robert Frost Stone House Museum, South Shaftsbury, Vermont
- National Register of Historic Places listings in Grafton County, New Hampshire
- List of residences of American writers
