= Marc Nieson =

American screenwriter and professor

Marc Nieson (born in Brooklyn, New York) is an American screenwriter and professor. His writings span fiction, creative nonfiction, and screenwriting. He has been awarded the Literal Latte Fiction Award and a Raymond Carver Short Story Award.

He teaches on the Master of Fine Arts in Creative Writing Program at Chatham University in Pittsburgh, Pennsylvania.

He studied at New York University (B.F.A.) and Iowa Writers' Workshop (M.F.A.)

== Books ==
- Schoolhouse, memoir (Ice Cube Press, 2016)

== Screenplays ==
- '"Bottomland'", (Feature Film) Co-Writer, Co-producer. (Winner 1992 Houston Int'l Film Fest)
- "The Dream Catcher", (Feature Film), Co-Writer. 1999. (Winner 11 Int'l Film Festivals)
- "The Speed of Life", (Feature Film), Co-Writer. (Premiere/Special Jury Prize: 2007 Venice Int'l Film Fest)
