= Alan Shapiro (poet) =

American writer

Alan Richard Shapiro (born February 18, 1952, in Boston, Massachusetts) is an American poet and professor of English and creative writing at the university of North Carolina, Chapel Hill.

Shapiro's poetry books include Tantalus in Love, Song and Dance, and Dead Alive and Busy. In addition to poetry, Shapiro has published two personal memoirs, Vigil and The Last Happy Occasion.

== Bibliography ==
=== Poetry collections ===
- The Courtesy
- Happy Hour
- Covenant
- Mixed Company
- The Last Happy Occasion
- Vigil
- After the Digging
- The Dead Alive and Busy
- Song and Dance
- Tantalus in Love
- Old War
- Night of the Republic
- Reel to Reel

=== List of poems ===
| Title | Year | First published | Reprinted/collected |
|---|---|---|---|
| Reel to reel | 2013 | Shapiro, Alan (April 15, 2013). "Reel to reel". The New Yorker. Vol. 89, no. 9. pp. 48–49. | |

=== Essays ===
- Shapiro, Alan (1993). In praise of the impure : poetry and the ethical imagination : essays, 1980-1991. Evanston, Ill.: TriQuarterly Books.

== Awards and honors ==
- Wallace Stegner Creative Writing Fellowship in poetry, Stanford University, 1975–76
- Academy of American Poets Award, Stanford University, 1976
- Illinois Arts Council Award (Happy Hour, Bedtime Story,Genie), 1984
- National Endowment for the Arts Fellowship in poetry, 1984–85
- Guggenheim Fellowship in poetry, 1985–86
- Nomination for National Book Critics' Circle Award (Happy Hour), 1987
- Robert and Hazel Ferguson Memorial Award (Happy Hour), 1987
- William Carlos Williams Award (Happy Hour), 1987
- Illinois Arts Council Award (Maison des Jeunes), 1988
- Lila Wallace-Reader's Digest Writers Award, 1991
- National Endowment for the Arts Fellowship in poetry, 1991
- John H. McGinnis Award for best essay (Fanatics), 1995
- Los Angeles Times Book Award in poetry (Mixed Company), 1996
- Finalist for National Book Circle Critics Award (The Last Happy Occasion ), 1996
- Publishers Weekly Best Book of the Year (The Last Happy Occasion), 1996
- Pushcart Prize - Essay (Fanatics), 1996
- New England Book Sellers Association Discovery of the Month Award (Vigil), 1997
- Undergraduate Teaching Award, University of North Carolina, Chapel Hill, 1998
- Arts Fellowship from The Project on Death in America of the Open Society Institute, 1999
- Institute for the Arts and Humanities Fellowship, UNC (spring), 1999
- O .B. Hardison Jr. Poetry Prize, from the Folger Library, 1999
- Kingsley Tufts Poetry Award (Dead Alive and Busy), 2001
- American Academy of Arts and Letters Writer's Award, 2002
- Roanoke-Chowan Award - NC Literary and Historical Society, (Song & Dance), 2003
- Elected Fellow to the American Academy of Arts and Sciences, 2005
- Roanoke-Chowan Award (Tantalus in Love ), 2005
- Sara Teasdale Award - Wellesley College, 2005
- Ambassador Book Award - English Speaking Union of the United States (Old War), 2009
- Finalist for National Book Award in poetry, 2012
