= Artis Henderson =

American journalist and memoirist

- Alma mater: University of Pennsylvania; Columbia University Graduate School of Journalism; Warren Wilson College MFA Program for Writers
- Occupation: Writer, memoirist
- Works: Unremarried Widow
- Website: artishenderson.com/index.html

Artis Henderson is an American journalist and essayist known for Unremarried Widow, her memoir of young marriage to a military officer. As a young widow, she experienced a rare event that put her at odds with her contemporaries, and her book is used as an example by the European Journal of Life Writing of a paradigm for the subgenre of young widow memoirs.

== Education ==
Henderson has an undergraduate degree from the University of Pennsylvania, a graduate degree from Columbia University’s School of Journalism, and an MFA from the Program for Writers at Warren Wilson College.

== Career ==
Henderson's drive to become a writer was inspired by a letter she received in her husband's possessions after his death, in 2006, while serving in Iraq. His letter told her that if anything should happen to him, she should "follow your dreams with all your heart, and with honor and decency”.

Henderson's book Unremarried Widow began as a New York Times "Modern Love" column and was described as 'gold star work' by the New York Times Book Review. The book was a New York Times Editors' Choice winner and was named to more than 10 Best of the Year Lists.

Her journalism work has covered conservation easements in Florida, water quality on Florida’s southwest coast, the importance of mangroves and swampland for balancing development and the environment, the shrimping industry on San Carlos Island, and wreck diving off the coast of Key Largo.

As a conservation journalist and recipient of the 2024 Fulbright-National Geographic Award, she investigates the effects of climate change on the flora of Shark Bay in Western Australia and the cultural implications for the Malgana people.

== Books ==
- Unremarried Widow: A Memoir (2016) ISBN 978-1-4516-4929-1 (Note: A selection of reviews written about the book: Book review: ‘Un-Remarried Widow,’ by Artis Henderson – Dallas Morning News; BOOK REVIEW: ‘Unremarried Widow’ By Artis Henderson – San Antonio Report; Book review: Un-Remarried Widow, by Artis Henderson – South China Morning Post; 'Un-Remarried Widow': Toll of war touchingly told by soldier's wife – The Columbus Dispatch; 'Unremarried Widow' recounts how Army wife lost husband in Iraq 4 months after wedding (review) – Mlive; Review: "Unremarried Widow" – Columbia Magazine; Unremarried Widow: A Memoir by Artis Henderson – The Week; Book Shelf: Unremarried Widow – Tragedy Assistance Program for Survivors; ’Artis Henderson’s memoir will be on my list of best of 2014’ – Maclean's; REVIEW: 'Unremarried Widow,' by Artis Henderson – Minnesota Star Tribune; Nonfiction Reviews: Unremarried Widow – Publishers Weekly; Unremarried Widow – The Booklist; Young war widow's memoir a revealing portrait of grief – The Buffalo News)
- No Ordinary Bird: Drug Smuggling, a Plane Crash, and a Daughter’s Quest for the Truth (2025) Harper. ISBN 978-0-358-65027-0
