= Carol Frost =

American poet (born 1948)

Carol Frost (born 1948) is an American poet. Frost has published several collections of poetry, and has held several teaching residencies. Frost is the founder and director of the Catskill Poetry Workshop at Hartwick College. Her work has featured in four Pushcart Prize anthologies.

== Biography ==
Frost was born in Lowell, Massachusetts, and later graduated from the State University of Oneonta and Syracuse University after studying at the Sorbonne in Paris. Frost has received grants from the National Endowment for the Arts and is the winner of Pushcart Prizes. Frost's poetry has been praised for its "protean layers of observation" and her “encyclopedic approach to subject matter.”

Frost writes in intensive bursts of at least three weeks after spending not writing for several weeks or months. After her bursts of writing she likes to walk or go sailing. As a teacher Frost has been in residence at the Vermont Studio Center and taught at Washington University in St. Louis, Hartwick College and Wichita State University. Frost has also been a visiting poet at University of Wollongong in Australia.

== Bibliography ==
- Alias City (2019)
- Entwined: Three Lyric Sequences (2014)
- Honeycomb: Poems (2010)
- The Queen's Desertion (2006)
- I Will Say Beauty (2003)
- Love and Scorn: New and Selected Poems (2000)
- Venus and Don Juan (1996)
- Pure (1994)
- Chimera (1990)
- Day of the Body (1986)
- The Fearful Child (1983)
- Liar’s Dice (1978)
- The Salt Lesson (1976)
