= John Skoyles (poet) =

American poet and writer (born 1949)

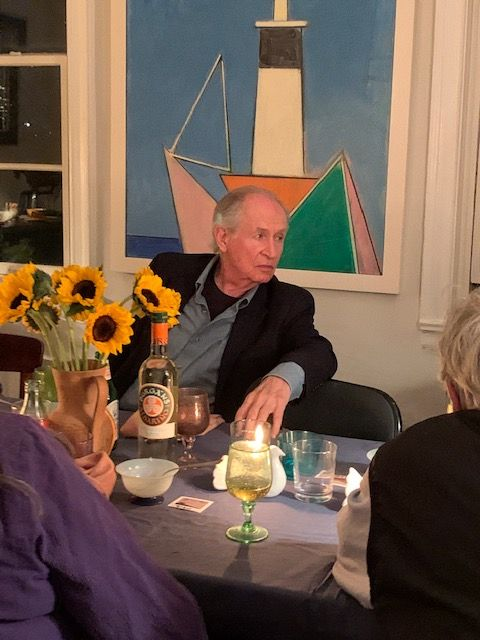
- Born: December 11, 1949 (age 76); New York City, U.S.
- Education: Fairfield University, BA; University of Iowa (MA, MFA)
- Occupations: Poet, writer
- Website: johnskoyles.org

John Skoyles (born December 11, 1949, in Queens, New York) is an American poet and writer.

== Early years ==
John Skoyles was born in Flushing, New York, the son of Olga (Bertolotti) and Gerard Skoyles, an envelope salesman. He attended Mater Christi High School (now St. John's Prep) in Astoria, graduating in 1967. He did his undergraduate work at Fairfield University and attended workshops at The Poetry Project at St. Mark's Church in-the-Bowery, where he was a student of Dick Gallup and Lewis MacAdams. He has an M.A. in English and an M.F.A. from the University of Iowa.

== Career ==
John Skoyles has taught at Southern Methodist University, Sarah Lawrence College, Warren Wilson College (where he directed the MFA program) and Emerson College. He has also served as the executive director of the Fine Arts Work Center in Provincetown from 1992 to 1994 and again in 2007.

He has written twelve books of fiction, nonfiction and poetry and served as poetry editor of Ploughshares from 2007 to 2025. His work has appeared in The New York Times, The New Yorker, The Atlantic, The American Poetry Review, Poetry, The Paris Review and others “My Mother, Heidegger, and Derrida”. He is a member of the Order of the Occult Hand and of the Writing Committee of the Fine Arts Work Center in Provincetown, Massachusetts. His latest book of prose is Driven, a memoir in travelogue form. His seventh book of poems, Yes and No, was published by Carnegie-Mellon University Press in the fall of 2021. His autobiographical novel, All the Question Marks is forthcoming in 2026 from Unbound Edition Press and his eighth book of poems, That's Where You Come In, will be published that same year by Carnegie-Mellon. He lives in New York City.

== Bibliography ==
=== Poetry ===
Collections

- Skoyles, John (1981). A little faith : poems. Pittsburgh: Carnegie Mellon University Press.
- Permanent Change (Carnegie Mellon University Press, 1991)
- Definition of the Soul (Carnegie Mellon University Press, 1998)
- The Situation, (Carnegie Mellon University Press, 2007)
- Suddenly It's Evening: Selected Poems (Carnegie Mellon University Press, 2016)
- Inside Job: New Poems (Carnegie Mellon University Press, 2016)
- Yes and No (Carnegie-Mellon University Press, 2021)
- That's Where You Come In (Carnegie-Mellon University Press, 2026)

List of poems

Title	Year	First published	Reprinted/collected
Autobiography	2014	Skoyles, John (March 31, 2014). "Autobiography". The New Yorker. Vol. 90, no. 6. pp. 62–63.	

=== Novels ===
- A Moveable Famine (The Permanent Press, 2014)
- All the Question Marks (Unbound Edition Press, 2026)

=== Non-fiction ===
- The Smoky Mountain Cage Bird Society and Other Magical Tales from Everyday Life (New York: "Kodansha International, 1997)
- The Nut File (Quale Press, 2017)
- Driven (MadHat Press, 2019)

Memoirs

- Generous Strangers and Other Moments from My Life (New York: Kodansha International, 1999) This is a re-titled paperback reprint of "The Smoky Mountain Cage Bird Society."
- Secret Frequencies: A New York Education (Lincoln: University of Nebraska Press, 2003)

== Sources ==
Contemporary Authors Online. The Gale Group, 2005.
