= Michael Ryan (poet) =

American poet, writer, and educator (born 1946)

- Born: 1946 (age 79–80); St. Louis, Missouri, U.S.
- Occupations: Poet; writer; educator
- Spouse: Doreen Gildroy
- Children: 1
- Writing career
- Notable awards: Whiting Award (1987); Kingsley Tufts Poetry Award (2005)

Michael Ryan (born 1946 in St. Louis) is an American poet, writer, and educator. He has been teaching creative writing and literature at University of California, Irvine since 1990.

== Life ==
He taught previously at the University of Iowa, Princeton University, the University of Virginia, and in the Warren Wilson College MFA Program for Writers. He is also a contributing editor at The Alaska Quarterly Review. He is currently the director of the MFA program at the University of California, Irvine.

He has written four books of poems, an autobiography, a memoir, and a collection of essays about poetry and writing.

His work has appeared regularly in The American Poetry Review, The Alaska Quarterly Review, The Threepenny Review, The New Yorker, Poetry Magazine.

He currently lives in California with his wife, Doreen Gildroy, and their daughter, Emily.

== Awards ==
- 1974 Yale Series of Younger Poets Award for Threats Instead of Trees
- 1980 National Poetry Series, In Winter
- 1981 Guggenheim Fellowship
- 1987 Whiting Award
- 1990 Lenore Marshall Poetry Prize for God Hunger
- 2005 Kingsley Tufts Poetry Award, for New and Selected Poems

== Selected publications ==
- "A Posthumous Poetics". Poetry. September 1973.
- "Insult". The New Yorker. November 5, 2007.
- "Airplane Food". Threepenny Review. Winter 2005.
- New And Selected Poems. (Houghton Mifflin, 2004)
- Baby B [memoir]. (Graywolf Press, 2004)
- A Difficult Grace: On Poets, Poetry, and Writing [essays]. (University of Georgia Press, 2000)
- Secret Life [autobiography]. (Pantheon, 1995; Vintage paperback, 1996)
- God Hunger [poems]. (Viking Penguin, 1989; paperback, 1990)
- In Winter [poems]. (Holt, 1981)
- Threats Instead of Trees [poems]. (Yale University Press, 1974)
