= 1995 in poetry =

Nationality words link to articles with information on the nation's poetry or literature (for instance, Irish or France).

== Events ==
- February 16 – It is announced that 300 poems by Samuel Taylor Coleridge have been discovered.
- February 17 – Sotheby's announce discovery of four Walt Whitman notebooks.
- March 1 – The Dylan Thomas Centre in Swansea (Wales) is opened by Jimmy Carter.
- May 26 – Cannes Film Festival première of movie Dead Man, written and directed by Jim Jarmusch, about a man named William Blake on a trek through the American West who is taken as the resurrected Romantic poet by a character named Nobody.

== Works published ==
Listed by nation where the work was first published and again by the poet's native land, if different; substantially revised works listed separately:

=== Australia ===
- Jennifer Harrison: Mosaics & Mirrors: Composite poems (Black Pepper)
- Chris Mansell, Day Easy Sunlight Fine in Hot Collation (Penguin, Melbourne) ISBN 978-0-14-024540-0
- Chris Wallace-Crabbe, Selected Poems 1956-1994, Oxford: Oxford University Press, Australia

=== Canada ===
- Margaret Atwood, Morning in the Burned House, McClelland & Stewart
- Anne Carson, Plainwater: Essays and Poetry, Knopf
- Roy Miki, Random Access File, Canada
- John Reibetanz, Morning Watch
- Joe Rosenblatt, A Tentacled Mother. (in the original plus new sonnets) Exile.
- Joe Rosenblatt,The Rosenblatt Reader. (selected poems and prose, 1962–1995) Exile.
- Raymond Souster, No Sad Songs Wanted Here. Ottawa: Oberon Press.

=== India, in English ===
- Meena Alexander, River and Bridge ( Poetry in English ), Toronto: TSAR Press and New Delhi: Rupa, by an Indian writing living in and published in the United States and India
- Sujata Bhatt, The Stinking Rose ( Poetry in English ), Carcanet Press and New Delhi: Penguin
- Keki Daruwalla, A Summer of Tigers ( Poetry in English ), New Delhi: Indus
- A. K. Ramanujan, The Collected Poems of A.K. Ramanujan ( Poetry in English ), Delhi: Oxford University Press; posthumously published
- Sudeep Sen, Dali’s Twisted Hands ( Poetry in English), New York City: White Swan Books; Leeds: Peepal Tree, ISBN 0-948833-84-X
- Tejdeep, Caught in a Stampede ( Poetry in English ), New Delhi: Sterling Publishers Private Limited
- K. Satchidanandan, Summer Rain: Three Decades of Poetry, edited by R. D. Yuyutsu; New Delhi: Nirala Publishers

=== Ireland ===
- Patrick Crotty (editor), editor, Modern Irish Poetry: An Anthology, Belfast, The Blackstaff Press Ltd., ISBN 0-85640-561-2
- Gerald Dawe, Heart of Hearts, Oldcastle: The Gallery Press, ISBN 978-1-85235-154-0
- John Montague, Collected Poems, including "Small Secrets", Oldcastle: The Gallery Press
- Maurice Riordan, A Word from the Loki, including "Milk", "A Word from the Loki" and "Time Out"", Faber and Faber, Irish poet published in the United Kingdom

=== New Zealand ===
- Fleur Adcock (New Zealand poet who moved to England in 1963) and Jacqueline Simms, editors, The Oxford Book of Creatures, verse and prose anthology, Oxford: Oxford University Press
- Jenny Bornholdt, How We Met, New Zealand
- Janet Charman, end of the dry, Auckland: Auckland University Press
- Robin Hyde, The Victory Hymn, 1935-1995, with an essay by Michele Leggott; Auckland: Holloway Press, New Zealand
- Mark Williams and Michele Leggott, editors, Opening the Book : New Essays on New Zealand Writing Auckland: Auckland University Press, criticism

=== United Kingdom ===
- Fleur Adcock (New Zealand poet who moved to England in 1963) and Jacqueline Simms, editors, The Oxford Book of Creatures, verse and prose anthology, Oxford University Press
- James Berry, Hot Earth, Cold Earth
- Alison Brackenbury, 1829, Carcanet Press, ISBN 978-1-85754-122-9
- Gerry Cambridge, The Shell House, Scottish Cultural Press, ISBN 1-898218-34-X
- Flora Garry, Collected Poems
- George Gissing (died 1903), The Poetry of George Gissing, edited by Bouwe Postmus, Edwin Mellen Press
- Tony Harrison, The Shadow of Hiroshima
- Ted Hughes, New Selected Poems 1957–1994
- Jan Kochanowski, Laments, a cycle of Polish Renaissance elegies, translated by Seamus Heaney and Stanisław Barańczak, Faber & Faber
- Michael Longley, The Ghost Orchid
- Derek Mahon, The Hudson Letter, Gallery Press
- Sean O'Brien, Ghost Train, Oxford University Press
- Peter Reading, Collected Poems 1970–1984
- Maurice Riordan, A Word from the Loki, Faber & Faber, Irish poet published in the United Kingdom
- Carol Rumens, Best China Sky
- Labi Siffre, Blood on the Page
- R. S. Thomas, No Truce with the Furies
- Charles Tomlinson, Jubilation

==== Anthologies in the United Kingdom ====
- Simon Armitage, Tony Harrison and Sean O'Brien, Penguin Modern Poets 5, Penguin
- Eavan Boland, Carol Ann Duffy and Vicki Feaver, Penguin Modern Poets 2, Penguin
- Roderick Watson, editor, The Poetry of Scotland: Gaelic, Scots and English, 1380–1980, Edinburgh University Press (anthology)
- Stella Chipasula and Frank Chipasula, editors, The Heinemann book of African women's poetry, London: Heinemann (anthology)

==== Criticism, scholarship and biography in the United Kingdom ====
- Robert F. Garratt, editor, Critical essays on Seamus Heaney, ISBN 0-7838-0004-5

=== United States ===
- Meena Alexander, River and Bridge, Toronto: TSAR Press and New Delhi: Rupa, by an Indian writing living in and published in the United States and India
- Ralph Angel, Neither World
- John Ashbery, Can You Hear, Bird?
- Matthew Rohrer, ‘’A Hummock in the Malookas’’
- Joseph Brodsky: On Grief and Reason: Essays, New York: Farrar, Straus & Giroux Russian-American
- Henri Cole, The Look of Things
- Nicholas Coles & Peter Oresick, For a Living (University of Illinois Press)
- Alice Fulton, Sensual Math
- Michael S. Harper, Honorable Amendments
- Fanny Howe, O'Clock
- Walter K. Lew, editor, Premonitions: The Kaya Anthology of New Asian North American poetry, New York: Kaya Productions
- James Merrill, A Scattering of Salts (his last book)
- Carl Rakosi, Poems, 1923-1941
- Mary Oliver, Blue Pastures
- Michael Palmer, At Passages
- Molly Peacock, Original Love
- Carl Phillips, Cortége
- Giorgos Seferis, Complete Poems (in English), translated by Edmund Keeley and Philip Sherrard

==== Criticism, scholarship and biography in the United States ====
- John Hollander, The Gazer's Spirit: Poems Speaking to Silent Works of Art, criticism
- Helen Vendler, The Breaking of Style: Hopkins, Heaney, Graham, Harvard University Press

==== The Best American Poetry 1995 ====
Richard Howard is the guest editor for The Best American Poetry 1995 (David Lehman, series editor). Howard changes the rules of inclusion for this year: "[P]oets whose work has appeared three or more times in this series are here and now ineligible, as are all seven former editors of the series." A total of 75 poems are included.

Poems from these 75 poets were in this year's anthology:

- Margaret Atwood
- Sally Ball
- Catherine Bowman
- Stephanie Brown
- Lewis Buzbee
- Cathleen Calbert
- Rafael Campo
- William Carpenter
- Nicholas Christopher
- Jane Cooper
- James Cummins
- Olena Kalytiak Davis
- Lynn Emanuel
- Elaine Equi
- Irving Feldman
- Donald Finkel
- Aaron Fogel
- Richard Frost
- Allen Ginsberg
- Peter Gizzi
- Jody Gladding
- Elton Glaser
- Albert Goldbarth
- Beckian Fritz Goldberg
- Laurence Goldstein
- Barbara Guest
- Marilyn Hacker
- Judith Hall
- Anthony Hecht
- Edward Hirsch
- Janet Holmes
- Andrew Hudgins
- T. R. Hummer
- Brigit Pegeen Kelly
- Karl Kirchwey
- Carolyn Kizer
- Wayne Koestenbaum
- John Koethe
- Yusef Komunyakaa
- Maxine Kumin
- Lisa Lewis
- Rachel Loden
- James Longenbach
- Robert Hill Long
- Gail Mazur
- J. D. McClatchy
- Heather McHugh
- Susan Musgrave
- Charles North
- Geoffrey O'Brien
- Jacqueline Osherow
- Molly Peacock
- Carl Phillips
- Marie Ponsot
- Bin Ramke
- Katrina Roberts
- Michael J. Rosen
- Kay Ryan
- Mary Jo Salter
- Tony Sanders
- Stephen Sandy
- Grace Schulman
- Robyn Selman
- Alan Shapiro
- Reginald Shepherd
- Angela Sorby
- Laurel Trivelpiece
- Paul Violi
- Arthur Vogelsang
- David Wagoner
- Charles H. Webb
- Ed Webster
- David Wojahn
- Jay Wright
- Stephen Yenser

=== Other in English ===
- Aharon Shabtai, Ha-lev ("The Heart"), Hebrew
- The Labourers of Herakles

== Works published in other languages ==
Listed by nation where the work was first published and again by the poet's native land, if different; substantially revised works listed separately:

=== Denmark ===
- Katrine Marie Guldager, Styrt, publisher: Gyldendal
- Klaus Høeck:
  - 1001 Digt, publisher: Gyldendal
  - Hommage, publisher: Basilisk

=== French language ===
- Andree Chedid, Par dela les mots (Lebanese resident of France, writing in French)
- Michel Deguy, A ce qui n'en finite pas; France
- Denise Desautels, Cimetières: La rage muette, autour de photographies de Monique Bertrand, Montréal: Éditions Dazibao; Canada
- Claude Esteban, Quelqu'un commence à parler dans une chambre, Flammarion; France

=== India ===
Listed in alphabetical order by first name:

- Amarjit Chandan, Jarhan, Aesthetic Publications, Ludhiana; Punjabi-language
- Basudev Sunani, Aneka Kichhi Ghatibaara Achhi, Nuapada: Eeshan-Ankit Prakashani; Oraya-language
- Chandrakanta Murasingh, Holong Kok Sao Bolong Bisingo, Agartala: Shyamlal Debbarma, Kokborok Sahitya Sanskriti Samsad; India, Kokborok-language
- Debarati Mitra, Kavitasamagra, Kolkata: Ananda Publishers; Bengali-language
- Dilip Chitre, Ekoon Kavita – 2, Mumbai: Popular Prakashan; Marathi-language
- Kedarnath Singh, Uttar Kabir aur Anya Kavitayen, Delhi: Rajkamal Prakashan; Hindi
- Namdeo Dhasal, Ya Sattet Jeev Ramat Nahi; Marathi-language
- Nirupama Dutt, Ik Nadi Sanwali Jahi ("A Stream Somewhat Dark"); Panchkula: Aadhar Prakashan; Punjabi-language
- Nirendranath Chakravarti, Shotyo Shelukash, Kolkata: Ananda Publishers; Bengali-language
- Saroop Dhruv, Salagti Havao, Ahmedabad: Samvedan Sanskritic Manch, Ahmedabad; Gujarati-language
- Udayan Vajpeyi; Hindi-language:
  - Kuchh Vakya, New Delhi: Vani Prakashan
  - Pagal Ganitagya Ki Kavitayen, New Delhi: Vani Prakashan

=== Spain ===
- Matilde Camus, Vuelo de la mente ("Mind flight")

=== Other languages ===
- Stanisław Barańczak, Slon, traba i ojczyzna ("The Elephant, the Trunk, and the Polish Question"), light verse; Kraków: Znak; Poland
- Mario Benedetti, El olvido está lleno de memoria ("Oblivion Is Full of Memory"), published in Spain, Uruguay
- Christoph Buchwald, general editor, and Joachim Sartorius, guest editor, Jahrbuch der Lyrik 1995/96 ("Poetry Yearbook 1995/96"), publisher: Beck; anthology; Germany
- Chen Kehua, Qiankantou shi ("Head-hunting Poems") Chinese (Taiwan)
- Limaza tarakt al-hissan wahidan (Why did you leave the horse alone?), 1995. English translation 2006 by Jeffrey Sacks (ISBN 0976395010)

== Awards and honors ==
- Nobel prize: Seamus Heaney

=== Australia ===
- C. J. Dennis Prize for Poetry: Bruce Beaver - Anima and Other Poems
- Dinny O'Hearn Poetry Prize: Selected poems 1956-1994 by Chris Wallace-Crabbe
- Kenneth Slessor Prize for Poetry: Peter Boyle, Coming Home From the World
- Mary Gilmore Prize: Jordie Albiston - Nervous Arcs

=== Canada ===
- Gerald Lampert Award: Keith Maillard, Dementia Americana
- Archibald Lampman Award: John Barton, Designs from the Interior
- 1995 Governor General's Awards: Anne Szumigalski, Voice (English); Émile Martel, Pour orchestre et poète seul (French)
- Pat Lowther Award: Beth Goobie, Scars of Light
- Prix Alain-Grandbois: Rachel Leclerc, Rabatteurs d'étoiles
- Dorothy Livesay Poetry Prize: Linda Rogers, Hard Candy
- Prix Émile-Nelligan: Marlène Belley, Les jours sont trop longs pour se mentir

=== India ===
- Sahitya Akademi Award : Kunwar Narayan for Koi Doosra Nahin
- Poetry Society India National Poetry Competition : Tabish Khair for Birds of North Europe & Gopi Kottoor for The Coffin Maker

=== New Zealand ===
- Montana Book Award for Poetry: Michael Jackson, Pieces of Music
- New Zealand Book Award for Poetry: Michele Leggott, Dia

=== United Kingdom ===
- Cholmondeley Award: U. A. Fanthorpe, Christopher Reid, C. H. Sisson, Kit Wright
- Eric Gregory Award: Colette Bryce, Sophie Hannah, Tobias Hill, Mark Wormald
- Forward Poetry Prize Best Collection: Sean O'Brien, Ghost Train (Oxford University Press)
- Forward Poetry Prize Best First Collection: Jane Duran, Breathe Now, Breathe (Enitharmon Press)
- T. S. Eliot Prize (United Kingdom and Ireland): Mark Doty, My Alexandria
- Whitbread Award for poetry: Bernard O'Donoghue, Gunpowder
- National Poetry Competition : James Harpur for The Frame of Furnace Light

=== United States ===
- Agnes Lynch Starrett Poetry Prize: Sandy Solomon, Pears, Lake, Sun
- Aiken Taylor Award for Modern American Poetry: Maxine Kumin
- AML Award for poetry to Marden J. Clark for "Snows"
- Bernard F. Connors Prize for Poetry: Vijay Seshadri, "Lifeline"
- Bollingen Prize: Kenneth Koch
- National Book Award for poetry: Stanley Kunitz, Passing Through: The Later Poems
- Poet Laureate Consultant in Poetry to the Library of Congress: Robert Hass appointed
- Pulitzer Prize for Poetry: Philip Levine, The Simple Truth
- Rhysling Award:
  - David Lunde, Pilot, Pilot (Long Form)
  - Dan Raphael, Skin of Glass (Short Form)
- Ruth Lilly Poetry Prize: A.R. Ammons
- Wallace Stevens Award: James Tate
- Whiting Awards: Lucy Grealy, James L. McMichael, Mary Ruefle
- Fellowship of the Academy of American Poets: Denise Levertov

== Deaths ==
Birth years link to the corresponding "[year] in poetry" article:

- January 28 – George Woodcock, 82 (born 1912), Canadian poet, biographer, academic and prominent anarchist
- February 6 – James Merrill, 68 (born 1926), American poet, of a heart attack
- April 14 – Brian Coffey, 89 (born 1905), Irish poet and publisher
- April 22 – Jane Kenyon, 47 (born 1947), American poet, of leukemia
- May 11 – David Avidan, 61 (born 1934), Israeli Hebrew-language poet
- July 7 – Helene Johnson, 89 (born 1906), African American poet, after osteoporosis
- July 16:
  - May Sarton, 83 (born 1912), American poet, novelist and memoirist, of breast cancer
  - Stephen Spender, 86, (born 1909), English poet and essayist, of a heart ailment
- September 3 – Earle Birney, 91 (born 1904), Canadian poet
- September 13 – Maheswar Neog, 80 (born 1915), Indian, Assamese-language scholar and poet
- September 18 – Donald Davie, 73 (born 1922), English poet, of cancer
- September 26 – Lynette Roberts, 86 (born 1909), Welsh poet
- October 22 – Kingsley Amis, 73 (born 1922), English novelist and poet, after a fall
- November 5 – Essex Hemphill, 38 (born 1957), African American poet and gay activist, from complications relating to AIDS
- December 30 – Heiner Müller, 66 (born 1929), German dramatist and poet

== See also ==
- Poetry
- List of years in poetry
- List of poetry awards
