= The Best American Poetry 1995 =

The Best American Poetry 1995, a volume in The Best American Poetry series, was edited by David Lehman and by guest editor Richard Howard.

For this edition of the series, Howard announced that "poets whose work has appeared three or more times in this series are here and now ineligible, as are all seven former editors of the series".

== Poets and poems included ==
Poet	Poem	Where poem previously appeared
Margaret Atwood	"Bored"	The Atlantic Monthly
Sally Ball	"Nocturnal"	Southwest Review
Catherine Bowman	"Mr. X"	Chelsea
Stephanie Brown	"Schadenfreude"	American Poetry Review
Lewis Buzbee	"Sunday, Tarzan in His Hammock"	ZYZZYVA
Cathleen Calbert	"The Woman Who Loved Things"	Harvard Review
Rafael Campo	"The Battle Hymn of the Republic"	Ploughshares
William Carpenter	"Girl Writing a Letter"	Iowa Review
Nicholas Christopher	"Terminus"	The Paris Review
Jane Cooper	"The Infusion Room"	American Poetry Review
James Cummins	"Sestina"	The Paris Review
Olena Kalytiak Davis	"Thirty Years Rising"	Michigan Quarterly Review
Lynn Emanuel	"Film Noir: Train Trip Out of Metropolis"	The Antioch Review
Elaine Equi	"Sometimes I Get Distracted"	New American Writing
Irving Feldman	"Terminal Laughs"	The Yale Review
Donald Finkel	"In the Clearing"	The Yale Review
Aaron Fogel	"The Printer's Error"	The Stud Duck
Richard Frost	"For a Brother"	North American Review
Allen Ginsberg	"Salutations to Fernando Pessoa"	The Threepenny Review
Peter Gizzi	"Another Day on the Pilgrimage"	apex of the M
Jody Gladding	"Asparagus"	The Yale Review
Elton Glaser	"Undead White European Male"	The Gettysburg Review
Albert Goldbarth	"A Still Life, Symbolic of Lines"	Southwest Review
Beckian Fritz Goldberg	"Being Pharaoh"	Field
Laurence Goldstein	"Permissive Entry: A Sermon on Fame"	The Tampa Review
Barbara Guest	"If So"	Princeton University Library Chronicle
Marilyn Hacker	"Days of 1992"	Colorado Review
Judith Hall	"St. Peregrinus' Cancer"	Western Humanities Review
Anthony Hecht	"Prospects"	The New Yorker
Edward Hirsch	"Unearthly Voices"	TriQuarterly
Janet Holmes	"Against the Literal"	The Georgia Review
Andrew Hudgins	"Seventeen"	The Southern Review
T. R. Hummer	"Apocatastasis Foretold in the Shape of a Canvas of Smoke"	Sewanee Theological Review
Brigit Pegeen Kelly	"All Wild Animals Were Once Called Deer"	The Massachusetts Review
Karl Kirchwey	"Sonogram"	The New Republic
Carolyn Kizer	"On a Line from Valery"	Princeton University Library Chronicle
Wayne Koestenbaum	"1975"	Boulevard
John Koethe	"Falling Water"	Western Humanities Review
Yusef Komunyakaa	"Troubling the Water"	Urbanus
Maxine Kumin	"Getting the Message"	Tikkun
Lisa Lewis	"Bridget"	American Poetry Review
Rachel Loden	"My Night with Philip Larldn"	B City
James Longenbach	"What You Find in the Woods"	The Yale Review
Robert Hill Long	"Refuge"	Manoa
Gail Mazur	"Fracture Santa Monica"	Colorado Review
J. D. McClatchy	"My Mammogram"	Poetry
Heather McHugh	"And What Do You Get"	Urbanus
Susan Musgrave	"Exchange of Fire"	Nimrod
Charles North	"Shooting for Line"	Hanging Loose
Geoffrey O'Brien	"The Interior Prisoner"	Hambone
Jacqueline Osherow	"Late Night Tete-a-Tete with a Moon in Transit"	Western Humanities Review
Molly Peacock	"Have You Ever Faked an Orgasm?"	The Paris Review
Carl Phillips	"Toys"	Boston Phoenix
Marie Ponsot	"Old Mama Saturday"	Western Humanities Review
Bin Ramke	"How Light Is Spent"	Pequod
Katrina Roberts	"How Late Desire Looks"	Harvard Magazine
Michael J. Rosen	"The Night Before His Parents' First; Trip to Europe His Mother Writes a Letter 'To Our Children'"	Salmagundi
Kay Ryan	"Outsider Art"	Partisan Review
Mary Jo Salter	"The Age of Reason"	The Threepenny Review
Tony Sanders	"Transit Authority"	The Yale Review
Stephen Sandy	"Threads"	The Paris Review
Grace Schulman	"The Present Perfect"	Boulevard
Robyn Selman	"Avec Amour"	The American Voice
Alan Shapiro	"Manufacturing "	TriQuarterly
Reginald Shepherd	"Brotherhood"	Colorado Review
Angela Sorby	"Museum Piece"	Kansas Quarterly
Laurel Trivelpiece	"The Nursery"	Witness
Paul Violi	"Scatter"	Painted Bride Quarterly
Arthur Vogelsang	"The Nose, the Grand Canyon, and the Sixties"	The Antioch Review
David Wagoner	"Walt Whitman Bathing"	The Yale Review
Charles H. Webb	"The Shape of History"	Michigan Quarterly Review
Ed Webster	"San Joaquin Valley Poems: 1969"	Western Humanities Review
David Wojahn	"Homage to Ryszard Kapuściński"	Poetry
Jay Wright	"The Cradle Logic of Autumn"	Callaloo
Stephen Yenser	"Blue Guide"	The Paris Review

== See also ==
- 1995 in poetry
