= The Best American Poetry 1998 =

The Best American Poetry 1998, a volume in The Best American Poetry series, was edited by David Lehman and by guest editor John Hollander.

== Poets and poems included ==
Poet	Poem	Where poem previously appeared
Jonathan Aaron	"Mr. Moto's Confession"	The New Republic
Agha Shahid Ali	"The Floating Post Office"	The Kenyon Review
Dick Allen	"The Cove"	The Hudson Review
A. R. Ammons	"Now Then"	Michigan Quarterly Review
Daniel Anderson	"A Possum's Tale"	Raritan
James Applewhite	"Botanical Garden: The Coastal Plains"	The Southern Review
Craig Arnold	"Hot"	Poetry
Sarah Arvio	from "Visits from the Seventh"	The Paris Review
John Ashbery	"Wakefulness"]	The New Yorker
Frank Bidart	"The Second Hour of the Night"	The Threepenny Review
Robert Bly	"A Week of Poems at Bennington"	AGNI
George Bradley	"In an Old Garden"	The New Yorker
John Bricuth	from "Just Let me Say This About That"	Southwest Review
Anne Carson	"TV Men: Antigone (Scripts 1 and 2)"	The Paris Review
Turner Cassity	"Symbol of the Faith"	Southwest Review
Henri Cole	"Self-Portrait as Four Styles of Pompeian Wall Painting"	The New Republic
Billy Collins	"Lines Composed Over Three; Thousand Miles from Tintern Abbey"	Poetry
Alfred Corn	"Jaffa"	New England Review
James Cummins	"Echo"	The Antioch Review
Thomas M. Disch	"What Else Is There"	Poetry
Denise Duhamel	"The Difference Between Pepsi and Pope"	Salt Hill
Lynn Emanuel	"Like God"	Boston Review
Irving Feldman	"Movietime"	The Kenyon Review
Emily Fragos	"Apollo's Kiss"	Chelsea (magazine)
Debora Greger	"Mass in B Minor"	New England Review
Allen Grossman	"Weird River"	Partisan Review
Thom Gunn	"To Cupid"	The New Yorker
Marilyn Hacker	"Again, The River"	Ploughshares
Rachel Hadas	"Pomegranate Variations"	The Kenyon Review
Donald Hall	"Letter with No Address"	Ploughshares
Joseph Harrison	"The Cretonnes of Penelope"	The Paris Review
Anthony Hecht	"Rara Avis in Terris"	The New Republic
Daryl Hine	"The World Is Everything; That Is the Case"	Poetry
Edward Hirsch	"The Lectures on Love"	The Paris Review
Richard Howard	"The Job Interview"	The New Republic
Andrew Hudgins	"The Hanging Gardens"	River Styx
Mark Jarman	"The Word "Answer"	Connecticut Review
Donald Justice	"Stanzas on a Hidden Theme"	The New Yorker
Brigit Pegeen Kelly	"The Orchard"	New England Review
Karl Kirchwey	"Roman Hours"	The Yale Review
Carolyn Kizer	"Second Time Around"	Michigan Quarterly Review
Kenneth Koch	"Ballade"	The Yale Review
John Koethe	"The Secret Amplitude"	Southwest Review
Rika Lesser	"About Her"	Poetry
Phillis Levin	"Ontological"	The New Criterion
Philip Levine	"Drum"	Michigan Quarterly Review
Rebecca McClanahan	"Making Love"	The Gettysburg Review
J. D. McClatchy	"Descartes's Dream"	Southwest Review
Heather McHugh	"Past All Understanding"	Denver Quarterly
Sandra McPherson	"Chalk-Circle Compass"	Poetry
W. S. Merwin	"The Chinese Mountain Fox"	The Yale Review
Robert Mezey	"Joe Simpson [ 1919-1996]"	The New Yorker
A. F. Moritz	"Artisan and Clerk"	The Yale Review
Thylias Moss	"The Right Empowerment of Light"	Michigan Quarterly Review
William Mullen	"Enchanted Rock"	The Yale Review
Eric Ormsby	"Flamingos"	The Gettysburg Review
Jacqueline Osherow	"Views of La Leggenda della Vera Croce"	Western Humanities Review
Robert Pinsky	"Ode to Meaning"	The Threepenny Review
Reynolds Price	"The Closing, the Ecstasy"	Poetry
Wyatt Prunty	"March"	Connecticut Review
Stephen Sandy	"Four Corners, Vermont"	The New Republic
Alan Shapiro	"The Coat"	Ploughshares
Robert B. Shaw	"A Geode"	The Hudson Review
Charles Simic	"Ambiguity's Wedding"	FIELD
Mark Strand	"The View"	The London Review of Books
James Tate	"Dream On"	American Poetry Review
Sidney Wade	"A Calm November. Sunday in the Fields."	Denver Quarterly
Derek Walcott	"Signs"	Conjunctions
Rosanna Warren	"'Departure'"	The New Republic
Rachel Wetzsteon	"from "Home and Away""	The Paris Review
Susan Wheeler	"Shanked on the Red Bed"	The New Yorker
Richard Wilbur	"For C."	The New Yorker
C. K. Williams	"The Bed"	Ontario Review
Greg Williamson	"The Dark Days"	The Yale Review
Charles Wright	"Returned to the Yaak Cabin, I Overhear an Old Greek Song"	Poetry

== See also ==
- 1998 in poetry
