= Sewanee Writers' Conference =

Writers' conference in Tennessee, USA

The Sewanee Writers' Conference is a writers' conference held every summer on the campus of the University of the South in Sewanee, Tennessee. The conference was started in 1989 by founding director Wyatt Prunty and the current director is Leah Stewart. The conference is funded largely by an endowment from the estate of acclaimed American playwright Tennessee Williams. The conference takes place over twelve days, during which participants attend writing workshops, readings, panel presentations, lectures on the craft of poetry, fiction, and playwriting, and numerous social gatherings.

== Admission ==
Admission to the conference is competitive and is decided through a formal application process. All applicants who are accepted to the conference have a portion of their expenses underwritten by the estate of Tennessee Williams.

Poets, non-fiction, and fiction writers who have published at least one full-length book, whether through a legitimate small press or a major publishing house, are eligible to apply for a limited number of fellowships to cover all tuition, room, and board for the conference. Poets, non-fiction, and fiction writers with a record of publication in periodicals are eligible to apply for scholarships (also limited in number) to cover conference tuition. Playwrights are also eligible for these awards if their work has seen production, either professional or amateur. Publication or production is not required for general admission to the conference.

== Faculty and staff ==
The faculty of the Sewanee Writers' Conference has included poets, fiction writers, nonfiction writers, and playwrights such as Daniel Anderson, Richard Bausch, Venita Blackburn, John Casey, Jaquira Díaz, Claudia Emerson, Daisy Foote, B.H. Fairchild, Debora Greger, Barry Hannah, Robert Hass, Beth Henley, Vanessa Hua, Andrew Hudgins, Mark Jarman, Donald Justice, Randall Kenan, Katie Kitamura, Margot Livesey, William Logan, Maurice Manning, Charles Martin, Alex Marzano-Lesnevich, Claire Messud, Jill McCorkle, Alice McDermott, Erin McGraw, Dan O'Brien, Elena Passarello, Carl Phillips, Aisha Sabatini Sloan, Mary Jo Salter, Christine Schutt, Dave Smith, A.E. Stallings, Mark Strand, Mona Van Duyn, Sidney Wade, Richard Wilbur, Steve Yarbrough, and many others.

Current and former conference staff members include current director Leah Stewart, Caki Wilkinson, Megan Roberts, Adam Latham, Gwen E. Kirby, Amy Arthur, Erica Dawson, Samuel Fox, Juliana Gray, Ananda Lima, Daniel Groves, Jonathan Bohr Heinen, Hastings Hensel, Carrie Jerrell, Jake Ricafrente, Kate Jayroe, Norris Eppes, and Adam Vines.
