= Interpretationes nominum Hebraicorum =

The interpretationes nominum Hebraicorum (lit. 'translations of Hebrew names', sing. interpretatio) are lexicons that give translations of the proper names of the Hebrew Bible into Latin. They were widely used study aids in the Latin Church during the Middle Ages and were often copied alongside the biblical text.

The end of Genesis (S–T–Y–Z) and start of Exodus (A) in a 9th-century copy of Jerome's interpretatio

The original interpretatio was the Liber interpretationum Hebraicorum nominum of Jerome (died 420). This was arranged by biblical book and alphabetically within each book. This led sometimes to doubling of entries. Jerome drew on the work of Philo and the Onomasticon of Eusebius, but whereas Eusebius listed mainly place names, Jerome's lists was mostly personal names. He also included references to his own Hebrew Questions on Genesis. The headwords are in Hebrew (or occasionally Aramaic) transliterated into Latin followed by a definition ranging in length from a single word to a short paragraph. Jerome's first entry is Aethiopiae.

Most later lexicons are derived from Jerome's Liber. Alcuin's Interpretationes nominum Hebraicorum progenitorum Domini Nostri Iesu Christi is a "digest" of Jerome's but informed by Ailerán's Interpretatio mystica et moralis progenitorum Domini Iesu Christi. A few later lexicons are new creations, such as that in the British Library manuscript Royal MS 2 F IV, which was created from the Etymologies of Isidore without the use of Jerome.

Later lexicons are usually organized alphabetically without division. Some later ones were enhanced with a better knowledge of Hebrew. In the 12th century, Ralph Niger titled his work Philippicus in honour of the Jew who helped him with it. Most interpretationes, however, are conventionally known by their initial lemmata. Chronologically, they are:

- Adam homo sive terrenus, which arragnes entries by book within each letter
- Aaron mons fortitudinis (before 1139)
- Aaz apprehendens (early 12th century), wrongly attributed to Bede, Remigius of Auxerre and Stephen Langton, although a revision attributed Langton may be found in a near-contemporary manuscript in Montpellier
- Abba interpretatur pater, by an anonymous Carthusian
- Assur a quo dominati sunt assiri, by Jehannot Roussignol

Interpretationes and the meanings they provided were especially popular among monastic exegetes doing tropological readings. After about 1230, they were the norm in single-volume bibles and survive in hundreds of manuscripts. Aaz was the most popular, followed by Aaron then Adam.

Given the many variations in the manuscripts and their complicated transmission, it is impossible to give a precise number of entries for each of the Jerome derivatives. Jerome's work has 3,157 entries. Adam has about 1,050; Aaron about 1,425; and Aaz about 5,250, including a certain number of non-biblical words. In Adam, the gloss is preceded by description of the person or place. In the Aaron–Zorobabel, a late subclass of Aaron, the gloss is followed by a reference to book and chapter. For example, the entries for Arphaxad are as follows:

Jerome
Arfaxath
healer of the ravaging

Adam
Arfaxad
the third son of Sem, Noah's son; of whom came the race of Chaldees; likewise king of Medes in Judith
healer of the ravaging

Aaron–Zorobabel
Arphaxath
healer or speaker of the ravaging
(Gen. 10, Jud. 1)

Aaz
Arphaxat
healer or speaker of the ravaging

== Works cited ==
- Bullough, Donald (2004). Alcuin: Achievement and Reputation. Brill.
- Campanini, Saverio (2023). "Some Preliminary Remarks on the Origins of Hebrew–Latin Lexicography". Histoire Épistémologie Langage. 45 (2): 87–104.
- Dahan, Gilbert (2000). "Interpretationes nominum Hebraicorum". In André Vauchez (ed.). Encyclopedia of the Middle Ages. Vol. 1. Fitzroy Dearborn. p. 730.
- Garrison, Mary (1995). Alcuin's World Through His Letters and Verse (PhD diss.). University of Cambridge.
- Poleg, Eyal (2013). "The Interpretations of Hebrew Names in Theory and Practice". In Eyal Poleg; Laura Light (eds.). Form and Function in the Late Medieval Bible. Brill. pp. 217–236.
- Pucci, Joseph, ed. (2024). The Poetry of Alcuin of York: A Translation with Introduction and Commentary. Routledge.
- Valle Rodríguez, Carlos del (2000). Corpus hebraicum nebrissense: la obra hebraica de Antonio de Nebrija. Aben Ezra Ediciones.
