= D. M. Aderibigbe =

Nigerian poet

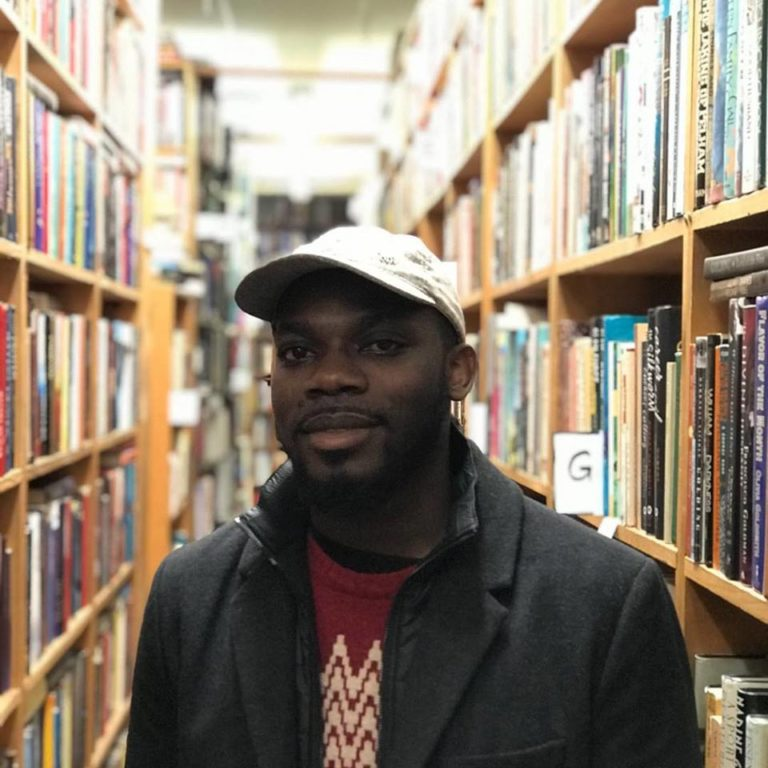
- Born: Damilola Michael Aderibigbe; 1989 (age 36–37); Lagos, Nigeria
- Education: University of Lagos; Boston University
- Occupation: Poet

Damilola Michael Aderibigbe (born 1989) is a Nigerian poet based in Binghamton, New York. He is an assistant professor of poetry at Binghamton University (State University of New York). He is the author of the debut collection of poems, How the End First Showed, which won the Brittingham Prize in Poetry, among other honors. In 2024, Aderibigbe's poetry collection, 82nd Division, was selected for the National Poetry Series, one of the most prestigious poetry book awards in the United States.

== Early life and education ==
Born in Lagos, Aderibigbe earned his bachelor's degree in history at the University of Lagos in 2014, after which he was admitted to the MFA program in creative writing at Boston University, where he received a Robert Pinsky Global Fellowship. Upon completing his masters studies in 2017, he proceeded to Florida State University where he earned his doctorate degree in 2022, majoring in English and Creative Writing, with a minor in Global Black Literature.

== Career ==
Aderibigbe is the author of the debut poetry collection, How the End First Showed, which won the 2018 Brittingham Prize in Poetry, a Florida Book Award, and was a finalist for the Glenna Luschei Prize for African Poetry and the Sheila Margaret Motton Book Prize. The book also received praise and coverage from numerous publications, including The Washington Post, The Boston Globe, The New York Journal of Books, The Bay State Banner, Bostonia Magazine, Poetry Daily, The Hartford Courant, Africa in Words, The Stockholm Review of Literature, The Journal of Gender Studies among others. He is also the author of a poetry chapbook, In Praise of Our Absent Father, selected for the New Generation African Poets Series of the African Poetry Book Fund. His first full-length manuscript, My Mothers' Songs and Other Similar Songs I Learnt, received a special mention in the 2015 Sillerman First Book Prize for African Poets.

Aderibigbe's poems have appeared in the African American Review, Alaska Quarterly Review, New England Review, The Hudson Review, The Nation, Ninth Letter, Poetry Review, Sierra,Prairie Schooner, Shenandoah, and elsewhere, and has been featured on Verse Daily.

Aderibigbe has won several fellowships, residencies, and honors from the James Merrill House, Banff Center for the Arts, Provincetown Fine Arts Work Center, Ucross Foundation, Sewanee Writers’ Conference (Walter E. Dakin Fellowship) at the University of the South, OMI International Arts Center, the Jentel Foundation, among others.
