= Bird Skin Coat =

2009 book by Angela Sorby

Bird Skin Coat is a book of poetry by Angela Sorby published in 2009. It won the 2009 Brittingham Prize in Poetry, judged by Marilyn Nelson.
