= Greg Williamson (poet) =

American poet (born 1964)

- Born: 1964 (age 61–62)
- Education: Vanderbilt University; University of Wisconsin–Madison; Johns Hopkins University
- Occupations: Poet & poetry professor
- Employer: Johns Hopkins University
- Website: gregwilliamsonbooks.com

Greg Williamson (born 1964) is an American poet. He is most known for the invention of the "Double Exposure" form in which one poem can be read three different ways: solely the standard type, solely the bold type in alternating lines, or the combination of the two.

== Life ==
Williamson grew up in Nashville, Tennessee. He was educated at Vanderbilt University, University of Wisconsin–Madison and Johns Hopkins University.

He teaches at Johns Hopkins University in the Writing Seminars and lives in Baltimore, Maryland. He is Associate Editor at Waywiser Press.

== Awards ==
- 1998 Whiting Award
- Nathan Haskell Dole Prize
- 1995 Nicholas Roerich Poetry Prize
- John Atherton Fellowship
- 2004 Academy Award in Literature from the American Academy of Arts and Letters
- The Best American Poetry 1998
- Runner-up for NYC Poets' Prize

== Works ==
- "The Birdhouse", Verse Daily
- "from Double Exposures", Poetry, August 2000
- The Silent Partner. Story Line Press. 1995. ISBN 978-1-885266-11-8.
- Errors in the Script. Overlook Press. 2001. ISBN 978-1-58567-117-5.
- A Most Marvelous Piece of Luck. Waywiser Press. 2008. ISBN 978-1-904130-28-4.

=== Anthologies ===
- John Hollander; David Lehman, eds. (1998). The Best American poetry, 1998. Scribner. ISBN 978-0-684-81453-7.
- Michael Dumanis; Cate Marvin, eds. (2006). Legitimate dangers: American poets of the new century. Sarabande Books. ISBN 978-1-932511-29-1.
- Maggie Anderson; David Hassler, eds. (1999). "Drawing Hands". Learning by heart: contemporary American poetry about school. University of Iowa Press. ISBN 978-0-87745-663-6.
