= Jazzy Danziger =

American poet and editor

- Born: Jessica Danziger; 5 December 1984; St. Louis, Missouri, USA
- Education: Washington University; University of Virginia
- Occupation: Poet
- Writing career
- Notable awards: Brittingham Prize in Poetry (2012)
- Website: www.jazzydanziger.com

Jazzy Danziger (born 1984) is an American poet and editor.

== Life and career ==
Danziger was born in St. Louis, Missouri, and raised in Maitland, Florida. She earned her bachelor's degree from Washington University in St. Louis and her MFA in Poetry from the University of Virginia, where she was Editor in Chief of Meridian. She has served as series editor for the annual Best New Poets anthology since 2011.

== Books ==
As author:

- Darkroom (University of Wisconsin Press, 2012)

As editor:

- Best New Poets 2015 (Samovar/University of Virginia Press, 2015) with guest editor Tracy K. Smith
- Best New Poets 2014 (Samovar/University of Virginia Press, 2014) with guest editor Dorianne Laux
- Best New Poets 2013 (Samovar/University of Virginia Press, 2013) with guest editor Brenda Shaughnessy
- Best New Poets 2012 (Samovar/University of Virginia Press, 2012) with guest editor Matthew Dickman
- Best New Poets 2011 (Samovar/University of Virginia Press, 2011) with guest editor D. A. Powell

Anthology publications:

- Two Weeks: A Digital Anthology of Contemporary Poetry (Linebreak, 2011)

== Awards ==
- Brittingham Prize in Poetry (Judge: Jean Valentine) (2012)

From the University of Virginia:

- Henry Hoyns/Poe-Faulkner Fellowship (2008–2010)

From Washington University in St. Louis:

- Academy of American Poets Prize (Judge: Bin Ramke) (2006)
- Academy of American Poets Prize Honorable Mention (Judge: Thomas Sayers Ellis) (2007)
- Roger Conant Hatch Prize for Poetry (2006 and 2007)
- Norma Lowry Memorial Fund Prize for Poetry (2007)
- Andrea Goff Memorial Prize for Poetry (2007)
- Julia Viola McNeely Memorial Prize for Poetry (2006 and 2007)
