= Judith Vollmer =

American poet

Judith Vollmer (born 1951 in Pittsburgh, Pennsylvania) is an American poet and editor.

She teaches privately, and in The Drew University MFA Program in Poetry & Poetry in Translation; and is Emerita Professor of English, University of Pittsburgh/Greensburg.

Vollmer is the author of five full-length books of poetry, including most recently The Apollonia Poems (University of Wisconsin Press 2017).Vollmer co-founded 5 AM, a national poetry journal which published twice yearly from 1984-2013. Three of her five full-length books are from the university press at the University of Wisconsin–Madison.

== Awards and honours ==
Book publication awards include the Brittingham, the Cleveland State, and the Center for Book Arts (limited edition) prizes. She has won Literature Fellowships from the National Endowment for the Arts and Pennsylvania Council on the Arts, as well as residencies at the American Academy in Rome, Yaddo, Centrum Foundation, Blue Mountain Center, and Vermont Studio Colony.

== Published works ==
- The Water Books, poetry (Pittsburgh: Autumn House Press, 2012)
- Reactor, poetry (Madison: University of Wisconsin Press, 2004)
- The Door Open To the Fire, poetry (Cleveland: Cleveland State University, 1998)
- Black Butterfly, poetry (New York: Center for Book Arts, 1997)
- Level Green, poetry; winner of the Brittingham Prize in Poetry (Madison: University of Wisconsin Press, 1990)
