= Julie Bruck =

Canadian-American poet

- Born: Montreal, Quebec
- Occupation: poet
- Spouse: Lewis Buzbee
- Writing career
- Period: 1990s–present
- Notable works: The Woman Downstairs, Monkey Ranch

Julie Bruck is a Canadian-American poet who won the Governor General's Award for English-language poetry in 2012 for her collection Monkey Ranch. She has published two previous collections, The Woman Downstairs (1993) and The End of Travel (1999). The Woman Downstairs won the A.M. Klein Prize for Poetry from the Quebec Writers' Federation Awards in 1994. She has also won two National Magazine Awards for poetry published in Canadian literary magazines. Bruck has also won a Sustainable Arts Foundation Promise Award and has also been nominated twice for the Pushcart Prize. She has received grants from the Canada Council for the Arts, and a Catherine Boettcher Fellowship from the MacDowell Colony.

== Biography ==
Julie Bruck is originally from Montreal, Quebec.

Beside publishing books, Bruck has also published in magazines and journals like The New Yorker, Ploughshares, The Walrus, The Malahat Review and Valparaiso Poetry Review. Her poems have featured in numerous anthologies.

Bruck has had a long teaching career. She has taught at many colleges and universities in Canada. She is a former resident faculty member at The Frost Place in Franconia, New Hampshire. Since 2005, she has been teaching poetry workshops for The Writing Salon in San Francisco's Mission district. She also teaches at the University of San Francisco.

She is currently based in San Francisco, California. She is married to American writer Lewis Buzbee.

== Bibliography ==
- The Woman Downstairs (1993)
- The End of Travel (1999)
- Monkey Ranch (2012)
- How to Avoid Huge Ships (2019)

=== Selected poems available online ===
- Bruck, Julie (November 7, 2011). "A marriage". The New Yorker.
