= Joanna Scott =

American writer (born 1960)

- Born: June 22, 1960 (age 66); Darien, Connecticut, U.S.
- Education: Trinity College (BA); Brown University (MFA)
- Occupations: author; professor
- Spouse: James Longenbach
- Children: 2
- Writing career
- Period: 1987–present
- Notable awards: MacArthur Fellowship (1992)

Joanna Scott (born June 22, 1960) is an American novelist, short story writer, and essayist. Her award-winning fiction is known for its wide-ranging subject matter and its incorporation of historical figures into imagined narratives.

A native of Darien, Connecticut, Scott graduated from Trinity College in Hartford and earned a master's degree from Brown University. In addition to her work as an author, she has had a career in academia, teaching at the University of Maryland and the University of Rochester, where she has been a member of the faculty since 1988. As of 2023 Scott is the Roswell Smith Burrows Professor of English at the University of Rochester.

== Early life and education ==
Joanna Scott was born on June 22, 1960, the youngest child of Walter Lee and Yvonne Scott. She was raised in Darien, Connecticut, with her three older brothers. Her father worked in advertising, and her mother was a psychologist for the school system in Stamford, Connecticut. Scott has described her childhood as one of extraordinary freedom but also isolation, both of which nurtured her imagination. As a student at Darien High School, she encountered the novels of William Faulkner, which she has described as an "unsettling" experience that prompted her first attempts at writing fiction.

After taking a bus trip across the United States, Scott enrolled at Trinity College in Hartford, Connecticut, where she majored in English and studied under the author Stephen Minot. She spent one semester in Rome and one academic year at Barnard College before graduating in 1983. She then spent a year as an assistant at a literary agency in New York City before enrolling in the Creative Writing Program at Brown University, where she studied with the authors Susan Sontag, Robert Coover, and John Hawkes. After earning her master's degree in 1985, she stayed at Brown for a year as a teaching fellow.

== Writing career ==
Scott began writing her first novel, Fading, My Parmacheene Belle, while at Brown University. It was published in 1987. Writing in The New York Times, Nancy Ramsey called it a "remarkably inventive first novel" that was moving and wise. In a separate review in The New York Times, Christopher Lehmann-Haupt criticized the novel's plot, but praised the "mad eloquence" of its prose.

In 1988, Scott's second novel, The Closest Possible Union, was published. Narrated by a teenaged boy, it tells the story of the violent voyage of a slave ship. Publishers Weekly declared that the "Kafkaesque" story "demonstrates conclusively that modern literature has a major new voice". However, the author Robert Houston found the novel disappointing, writing in The New York Times that it suffered from a disconnect between its language and its material.

Scott's third novel, Arrogance, appeared in 1990 to mixed reviews. A fragmented, fictional account inspired by the life of Austrian artist Egon Schiele, it was criticized in Publishers Weekly as reading like "an innovative treatise". Writing in The New York Times, the author Scott Bradfield also classified the work as "more…a treatise than a novel", although he praised its "vivid" use of "sensuous, provocative" material. However, Entertainment Weekly gave the novel an 'A' grade, and, writing in The Washington Post, J. D. McClatchy called it "a convincing portrait of tortured artistic genius and a dazzling literary performance".

In 1994, Scott released a collection of stories, Various Antidotes. This was followed by another novel, The Manikin (1996), a gothic story set in western New York. In the Los Angeles Times, Anna Mundow praised the novel's "feverish, hermetically sealed atmosphere", although she criticized its portrayal of its characters. Calling it "richly atmospheric", Kirkus Reviews declared that the novel "splendidly reinforces Scott's reputation as an original and imaginative writer". In The New York Times, Peter Prescott compared Scott's prose to the Metamorphoses of Ovid. The novel went on to be a finalist for the Pulitzer Prize in 1997.

In 2000, Scott published her fifth novel, Make Believe. She then took a sabbatical to live in Florence, Italy, where she conducted research and began work on novels set in Italy. These were Tourmaline (2002) and Liberation (2005). Another collection of short stories, Everybody Loves Somebody, was published in 2006.

Scott's eighth novel, Follow Me, appeared in 2009. Kirkus Reviews praised its "luminous prose" and "mythic" main character, while Publishers Weekly admired its "retelling of the archetypal American journey from a female perspective". It was followed by another novel, De Potter's Grand Tour (2014), which was inspired by the story of Scott's great-grandfather, Armand de Potter, and includes photos and other materials from Scott's family archives. In Library Journal, Neil Hollands called it "a fascinating tale of the dark side of the rags-to-riches story".

Scott's tenth novel, Careers for Women, appeared in 2017. A story collection, Excuse Me While I Disappear, appeared in 2021.

=== Form ===
External videos
- In this video from 2017, Scott reads from her novel, Careers for Women. (3 mins)

Scott has published fiction (both novels and short stories) and nonfiction (essays and book reviews). She is best known for fiction of lyrical prose that explores a wide range of subjects and employs a variety of literary techniques. The scholar Anne-Laure Tissut has characterized Scott's writing as displaying "a fascination for the diversity of the world and an awareness of the wealth of literary devices". Among the devices Scott has employed are magical realism and unreliable narration, and she is noted for her contributions to what the scholar Michael Lackey has called "biofiction", or biographical fiction, a form of literature that "names its protagonist after an actual historical figure" without being bound to the scholarly conventions of history or biography. Scott has done this by crafting fictions centered on historical figures ranging from Antonie van Leeuwenhoek to Egon Schiele to her own ancestors.

=== Themes ===
Scott's work is thematically diverse. Some scholarly attention has been paid to the feminist perspective in Scott's novels and their portrayal of women who navigate male-dominated arenas. Critics have also focused on Scott's preoccupation with all facets of creativity, including the psychology of artists, most obviously explored in Arrogance, and the choices made in the process of realizing a personal vision.

=== Influences ===
In interviews, Scott has pointed to the influence of William Faulkner, Samuel Beckett, Maureen Howard, and John Hawkes on her work.

== Academia ==
In 1987, the time of her first novel's publication, Scott was an instructor at the University of Rochester. She then joined the faculty, as an assistant professor, at the University of Maryland, College Park, for the 1987-88 academic year. In 1988, she rejoined the faculty of the University of Rochester as an assistant professor in the English department.

In 1999, Scott was appointed the Roswell Smith Burrows Professor of English at the University of Rochester.

As of 2023 Scott is the Roswell Smith Burrows Professor of English at the University of Rochester, and Director, Literary Arts Programs.

== Honors ==
Scott has received numerous honors for her work. Below are honors she has received for both her body of work and individual works.

=== Honors for body of work ===
- Guggenheim Fellowship for Creative Arts (1988)
- MacArthur Foundation Fellowship (1992)
- Lannan Literary Award for Fiction (1999)
- American Academy of Arts and Sciences, Elected Member (2001)
- Santa Maddalena Foundation Fellowship (2007)
- Honorary Doctorate, Trinity College (2009)
- Bogliasco Foundation Fellowship (2017)

=== Honors for individual works ===
- William Peden Prize of The Missouri Review for "From The Closest Possible Union" (1987)
- Richard and Hinda Rosenthal Foundation Award of the American Academy of Arts and Letters for Arrogance (1991)
- Aga Khan Prize for Fiction of The Paris Review for "A Borderline Case" (1992)
- Pushcart Prize for "Convicta et Combusta", originally published in Conjunctions (1993)
- The Southern Review Short Fiction Prize for Various Antidotes (1995)
- Ambassador Book Award of the English-Speaking Union for Liberation (2006)
- Pushcart Prize for "The Knowledge Gallery", originally published in Conjunctions (2016)
- Pushcart Prize for "Infidels", originally published in Conjunctions (2020)

In addition, Arrogance and Various Antidotes were both finalists for the PEN/Faulkner Award for Fiction; The Manikin was a finalist for the Pulitzer Prize for Fiction, and Tourmaline was a finalist for the Los Angeles Times Book Prize.

Scott's work has been anthologized in The Best American Short Stories, The Anchor Book of New American Short Stories, and elsewhere. She has been a visiting professor at Princeton University. She has also been an invited speaker at numerous institutions.

== Personal life ==
Scott was married to the poet and scholar James Longenbach until his death in 2022. They have two children.

== Selected bibliography ==
=== Novels ===
- Fading, My Parmacheene Belle. Ticknor & Fields, 1987. ISBN 9780899194516
- The Closest Possible Union. Ticknor & Fields, 1988. ISBN 9780899196626
- Arrogance. Linden Press/Simon & Schuster, 1990. ISBN 9780671695477
- The Manikin. Henry Holt, 1996. ISBN 9780805055917
- Make Believe. Little, Brown & Co., 2000. ISBN 9780316776165
- Tourmaline. Little, Brown & Co., 2002. ISBN 9780316776189
- Liberation. Little, Brown & Co., 2005. ISBN 9780316010535
- Follow Me. Little, Brown & Co., 2009. ISBN 9780316051651
- De Potter's Grand Tour. Farrar, Straus and Giroux, 2014. ISBN 9780374162337
- Careers for Women. Little, Brown & Co., 2017. ISBN 9780316363839

=== Story collections ===
- Various Antidotes. Henry Holt, 1994. ISBN 9780805026474
- Everybody Loves Somebody. Little, Brown & Co., 2006. ISBN 9780316013451
- Excuse Me While I Disappear. Little, Brown & Co., 2021. ISBN 9780316498746
