= Bernard F. Conners Prize for Poetry =

Poetry prize

The Bernard F. Conners Prize for Poetry is given by the Paris Review "for the finest poem over 200 lines published in The Paris Review in a given year", according to the magazine. The winner is awarded $1,000.

A "given year" for the Paris Review appears not to mean "calendar year". The magazine's awards sometimes go to more than one poet in a calendar year and to none in other calendar years.

== Winners ==
- 2004: Jeremy Glazier, Issue 171, for "Conversations with the Sidereal Messenger”
- 2003: Julie Sheehan, Issue 167, for “Brown-headed Cow Birds”
- 2002: Timothy Donnelly, Issue 164, “His Long Imprison'd Thought”
- 2001: Gabrielle Calvocoressi, Issue 160, “Circus Fire, 1944”
- 2000: Corey Marks, Issue 155, “Renunciation”
- 2000: Christopher D. Patton, Issue 157, “Broken Ground”
- 1999: J.D. McClatchy, Issue 152, “Tattoos”
- 1998: Neil Azevedo, Issue 148, “Caspar Hauser Songs”
- 1998: Sherod Santos, Issue 149, “Elegy for My Sister”
- 1997: John Drury, Issue 145, “Burning the Aspern Papers”
- 1996: Sarah Arvio, Issue 140, “Visits from the Seventh”
- 1996: John Voiklis, Issue 139, “The Princeling's Apology”
- 1995: Vijay Seshadri, Issue 137, “Lifeline”
- 1994: Marilyn Hacker, Issue 131, “Cancer Winter”
- 1994: Stewart James, Issue 132, “Vanessa”
- 1993: Stephen Yenser, Issue 129, “Blue Guide”
- 1992: Tony Sanders, Issue 126, “The Warning Track”
- 1991: Donald Hall, Issue 123, “Museum of Clear Ideas”
- 1990: Christopher Logue, Issue 117, “Kings”
- 1989: Jorie Graham, Issue 110, “Spring”
- 1988: David Lehman, Issue 106, “Mythologies”
- 1986: John Koethe, Issue 102, “Mistral”
- 1985: James Schuyler, Issue 96, “A Few Days”
- 1984: Gjertrud Schnackenberg, Issue 94, “Imaginary Prisons”
- 1984: Sharon Ben-Tov, Issue 93, “Carillon for Cambridge Women”
- 1982: Gerald Stern, Issue 83, “Father Guzman”
- 1981: Frank Bidart, Issue 80, “The War of Vaslav Nijinsky”

== See also ==
- American poetry
- List of poetry awards
- List of literary awards
- List of years in poetry
- List of years in literature
