= Susanne Antonetta =

American poet and author

Susanne Antonetta is the pen name of Suzanne Paola (born September 29, 1956, in Georgia), an American poet and author who is most widely known for her book Body Toxic: An Environmental Memoir. In 2001, Body Toxic was named by The New York Times as a "Notable Book". An excerpt of "Body Toxic" was published as a stand-alone essay which was recognized as a "Notable Essay" in the 1998 Best American Essays 1998 anthology. She has published several prize-winning collections of poems, including Bardo, a Brittingham Prize in Poetry winner, and the poetry books Petitioner, Glass, and most recently The Lives of The Saints. She currently resides in Washington with her husband and adopted son. She is widely published both in newspapers such as The New York Times and The Washington Post, as well as in literary journals including Orion, Brevity, JuxtaProse Literary Magazine, Seneca Review, and Image. She was previously the Editor-in-Chief of Bellingham Review.

== Early life ==
Paola was raised among the New Jersey Pine Barrens, which she later used as the setting for Body Toxic, in one of the most environmentally contaminated counties in the United States. Paola's memoir merges her personal and familial sagas with historical accounts, politics, and environmentalism.

== Career ==
Paola writes about how the poisoned landscape of her New Jersey childhood devastated her body, causing cardiac arrhythmia, seizures, severe allergies, and sterility. She recounts the story of the Radium Girls, details aspects of the frequent nuclear and industrial waste debacles in New Jersey, and relates these events to her family and neighbors.

Paola's memoir disputes attribution of her afflictions to genetic vulnerability, random chance, or recreational drug use. Vignettes depicting colossal man-made environmental disasters are woven into her story, accenting the recurrent medical catastrophes she endured, including endometriosis, rampant thyroid tumors, a quadruplet pregnancy (without fertility drugs) that ended in miscarriage, numerous growths on her liver and ovarian cysts that necessarily had to be removed, alongside repeated bouts of manic-depression. The latter condition was treated with psychotropic drugs, some of which are derived from the very same dye chemicals dumped, sometimes recklessly, into the environment of southern New Jersey.

=== Awards ===
- Notable Essay, Elizabeth, Best American Essays 1998
- Brittingham Prize in Poetry, Bardo, 1998
- New York Times Notable Book, Body Toxic, 2001
- Spirituality & Health|Spiriturality & Health - Best Book of the Year, Body Toxic, 2001
- Library Journal's Ten Best Science Books of the Year, Body Toxic, 2001
- American Book Award, Body Toxic, 2001
- NAMI/Ken Johnson Award, A Mind Apart, 2006
- Pushcart Prize, Hosts, 2012

== Bibliography ==
=== Creative Nonfiction ===
- Make Me A Mother New York, NY: (W.W. Norton, 2014) ISBN 978-0393068177
- A Mind Apart: Travels in a Neurodiverse World New York, NY: (Tarcher/Penguin, 2005) (reprinted 2007; ISBN 9781585425181)
- Body Toxic: An Environmental Memoir New York, NY: (Counterpoint, 2001) ISBN 9781582432090
- Body Toxic: An Environmental Memoir (Korean translation, Yeesaw Publishers (Gyeonggi-Do, Korea), 2005)

=== Poetry collections ===
- The Lives of the Saints Seattle, WA: (University of Washington Press, 2002)
- Bardo Madison, WI: (University of Wisconsin Press, 1998)
- Glass Princeton, NJ: (Quarterly Review of Literature Poetry Award Series, 1995)
- Petitioner Seattle, WA: (Owl Creek Press, 1986)

=== Textbooks ===
- Tell It Slant: Creating, Revising and Publishing Creative Nonfiction (2nd edition of "Tell It Slant: Writing & Shaping Creative Nonfiction") with coauthor Brenda Miller. New York, NY: (McGraw-Hill, 2012) ISBN 9780071781770
- Tell It Slant: Writing & Shaping Creative Nonfiction with coauthor Brenda Miller. (trade edition, McGraw-Hill, 2004)
- Tell It Slant: Writing & Shaping Creative Nonfiction with coauthor Brenda Miller. (McGraw-Hill, 2003)

== See also ==
- Rachel Carson
- Sandra Steingraber
- Radium Girls
