= Max Garland =

American poet and professor

Max Garland is a notable poet and author, known for his contributions to American literature. He has authored several poetry collections, including "The Postal Confessions," which won the Juniper Prize for Poetry in 1995; "Hunger Wide as Heaven," the winner of the CSU Poetry Center Open Competition in 2006; and "The Word We Used for It," which received the Brittingham Poetry Prize in 2017.

== Early life and education ==
Garland was born and raised in Paducah, Kentucky. He pursued his undergraduate studies at Western Kentucky University. After working for many years as a rural mail carrier in his hometown, Garland decided to further his education. He attended the Iowa Writer's Workshop, where he received an MFA in 1989.

== Career ==
Garland's career is marked by his dual roles as a writer and educator. Before focusing on his literary pursuits, he worked as a rural mail carrier on a route that held familial significance. He resigned from the Postal Service in 1986 to attend the Iowa Writer's Workshop.

Garland's work has been featured in numerous literary journals and anthologies, including Poetry, New England Review, Gettysburg Review, Georgia Review, Best American Short Stories, and Creative Non-Fiction. He is also a musician and songwriter, having written librettos for choral and orchestral compositions.

He has served as Professor Emeritus of English and Creative Writing at the University of Wisconsin–Eau Claire and has held the position of Writer-in-Residence for the City of Eau Claire. Garland was the Poet Laureate of Wisconsin in 2013 and 2014.

== Awards ==
- Juniper Prize for Poetry (1995) for "The Postal Confessions"
- CSU Poetry Center Open Competition (2006) for "Hunger Wide as Heaven"
- Brittingham Poetry Prize (2017) for "The Word We Used for It"
- NEA Fellowship for Poetry
- James Michener Writing Fellowship
- Bush Foundation Literary Fellowship
- Tara Short Fiction Award
- Wisconsin Institute for Creative Writing Fellowship
- Fellowships from the Wisconsin Arts Board in both poetry and fiction

In 2018, Garland was inducted as a Fellow of the Wisconsin Academy of Sciences, Arts, and Letters.
