= Laurel Trivelpiece =

American poet and novelist

Laurel Trivelpiece (1926 in Nebraska – 1998) was an American poet and novelist.

== Life ==
Trivelpiece worked in her youth as fruit-picker and later, after graduating from the University of California at Berkeley with a bachelor's degree in English Literature, as an editor and copy-writer for Macys and other department stores in the San Francisco Bay Area. She lived in Corte Madera, California.

Trivelpiece authored two poetry collections, four young adult novels, one adult novel, and prize-winning fiction and plays. Her second poetry collection, Blue Holes (Alice James Books, 1987), won the Beatrice Hawley Award, and one of her poems was included in Best American Poetry 1995. Her poems also appeared in literary journals and magazines including Poetry, The Massachusetts Review, The American Poetry Review, and The Malahat Review.

Her short story Gentle Constancy (Denver Quarterly, Fall) was acknowledged in the Distinctive Short Stories, 1970 list in The Best American Short Stories, 1971. Houghton Mifflin Co. ISBN 978-0-395127-09-4.

== Awards ==
- 1987 Beatrice Hawley Award

== Published works ==
Poetry Collections

- Blue Holes. Alice James Books. 1987. ISBN 978-0-914086-74-1.
- Legless in flight. Woolmer/Brotherson Ltd. 1978. ISBN 978-0-913506-05-9.

Young Adult Novels

- Just a Little Bit Lost. Scholastic. 1988. ISBN 978-0-590-41465-4.
- Trying Not to Love You. Pocket Books. 1985. ISBN 978-0-671-54394-5.
- In Love and in Trouble. Schuster Merchandise. 1984. ISBN 978-0-671-50443-4.
- During Water Peaches. Lippincott. 1979. ISBN 978-0-397-31831-5.

Adult Novels

- Triad (as Hannah K. Marks). Pocket Books. 1980. ISBN 978-0-671-82724-3.

Anthology Publications

- Richard Howard; David Lehman, eds. (1995). "Nursery". The Best American Poetry 1995. Simon and Schuster. ISBN 978-0-684-80151-3.
