= James Cummins (poet) =

American poet

James Cummins is an American poet.

== Biography ==
Cummins teaches at the University of Cincinnati and is the curator of the Elliston Poetry Collection. He is married to the poet and art critic, Maureen Bloomfield (Error and Angels, University of South Carolina, 1997). They have two daughters.

His poems have appeared in The Best American Poetry series in 1994, 1995, 1998, and 2005. Series editor David Lehman thanked Cummins for "useful suggestions" in the 2005 and 2006 editions of the series.

== Published books ==
- Portrait in a Spoon (University of South Carolina, 1997)
- The Whole Truth (North Point, 1986; Carnegie Mellon, 2003)
- Then and Now (Swallow Press, 2004)
- Jim and Dave Defeat the Masked Man (Soft Skull Press, 2005, with David Lehman and Archie Rand).
- Still Some Cake (Carnegie Mellon Press, 2012)
