= Jody Gladding =

American translator and poet (born 1955)

- Born: 1955 (age 70–71); York, Pennsylvania
- Education: Franklin & Marshall College, Cornell University
- Writing career
- Genre: Poetry

Jody Gladding (born 1955 York, Pennsylvania) is an American translator and poet. She was selected by James Dickey for the Yale Series of Younger Poets.

== Life ==
She graduated from Franklin & Marshall College, and Cornell University. Gladding, who also teaches in the MFA in Writing Program at Vermont College, is the author of four books of poetry, one of which is a letterpress edition and one of which is a chapbook. She also has been involved in two performance/installations in collaboration with fellow poet and friend Suzanne Heyd. She has received numerous prizes, fellowships and awards for both her poetry and her translations.

Her poems have recently appeared in these journals: Agni, Chicago Review, ecopoetics, Grand Street, Hunger Mountain, Northern Woodlands, Orion, Paris Review, Ploughshares, Poetry, Terra Nova, Wild Earth, Wilderness Magazine, Yale Review.

== Works ==
- Blue Willow, On the Verge: Emerging Poets and Artists, March 1994, New Cambridge Press, Poetry 180, Library of Congress
- Two Poems, Paris Review, Number 134, Spring 1995
- The Two Houses, Yale Review, January 1997
- Blue Willow; Indian Paint; Silver Queen; Uncle, AGNI 37, Boston University
- Beam; Shells, AGNI 45, Boston University
- Aunt Peter, AGNI 56, Boston University, 2002

=== Books ===
- Rooms and Their Airs. Milkweed Editions. April 2009. ISBN 978-1-57131-432-1.
- The Moon Rose, (Chester Creek Press, 2006), with accompanying woodcuts by Susan Walp.
- Artichoke. Chapiteau Press. January 2000. ISBN 978-1-890132-92-7. a chapbook
- Stone Crop. Yale University Press. June 1993. ISBN 978-0-300-05543-6.

=== Translations ===
- François Cheng, The Way of Beauty (Inner Traditions, 2009)
- Hervé This, The Science of the Oven (Columbia University Press, 2009)
- Michel Pastoureau, Black: History of a Color (Princeton University Press, 2008)
- Pierre Michon, Small Lives (Archipelago, 2008) ISBN 978-0-9728692-1-8, winner of the 2009 French-American Foundation Translation Prize
- Hervé This, Kitchen Mysteries (Columbia University Press, 2007)
- Natalie Rigal, Winning the Food Fight (Healing Arts Press, 2006)
- Madeleine Ferrières, Sacred Cow, Mad Cow (Columbia University Press, 2006)
- Jean Giono, The Serpent of Stars (Archipelago, 2004), ISBN 978-0-9728692-8-7, finalist for the 2004 French–American Foundation Translation Prize
- François Weil, A History of New York (Columbia University Press, 2004)
- Sylviane Agacinski, Time Passing, (Columbia University Press, 2003)
- J.-R. Pitte, French Gastronomy (Columbia University Press, 2002)
- Pierre Moinot, As Night Follows Day, (Welcome Rain, 2001)
- Michel Pastoureau, The Devil’s Cloth, (Columbia University Press, 2001)
- Jean Markale, The Epics of Celtic Ireland (Inner Traditions, 2000)
- D. Alexandre-Bidon, Children in the Middle Ages (University of Notre-Dame Press, 1999)
- Jean Markale, The Great Goddess (Inner Traditions, 1999)
- Gilbert Dahan, The Christian Polemic Against the Jews in the Middle Ages (University of Notre-Dame Press, 1998)
- Pierre Mabille, Mirror of the Marvelous (Inner Traditions, 1998)
- Daniel Odier, Tantric Quest (Inner Traditions, 1997)

=== Ploughshares ===
- Anger (Ira), Ploughshares, Winter 1997-98
- Squash (Cucurbite) , Ploughshares, Winter 1997-98
- Sweet Apples (Poma Mala Dulcia), Ploughshares, Winter 1997-98

== Fellowships and awards ==
- French-American Foundation Translation Prize, 2009, for Small Lives
- Resident Poet at The Frost Place in Franconia, NH, 2007
- Centre National du Livre de France Translation Grant, 2007
- French-American Foundation Prize Finalist, 2004, for Serpent of Stars
- Whiting Award, 1997
- Yale Series of Younger Poets Award, 1992, for Stone Crop
- Wallace Stegner Fellowship in Creative Writing; Stanford University, 1982–83
- Graduate Fellowship in Creative Writing; Cornell University, 1979–80
