= Don Almquist =

American painter (1929–2022)

Don Almquist (July 21, 1929 – March 1, 2022) was an American painter and illustrator.

== Biography ==
Don Almquist was born in Hartford, Connecticut on July 21, 1939. He was the son of Nils Herbert Almquist (1903–1960) and Jeannette Perrow (1905–1996). Almquist earned a BFA in 1951 from Rhode Island School of Design.

Almquist exhibited in seven one-man shows and sixteen juried shows in the US, Canada and Sweden while garnering a number of awards. Earlier in his career, he served as an art and creative director for Ahlen & Akerlund in Stockholm, Sweden, one of the largest and influential publishing houses in Europe, and also as graphics advisor to the U.S. Department of the Interior, Fish and Wildlife Service in Washington, D.C.. He died on March 1, 2022, at the age of 92.
