= Sally Ball =

American poet, editor, and professor

- Education: Williams College, Warren Wilson College
- Employer(s): Beloit College; Washington University; Arizona State University
- Writing career
- Genre: Poetry
- Notable awards: Margaret Bridgman Fellow

Sara Louise "Sally" Ball is an American poet, editor, and professor. She is the author of Annus Mirabilis (Barrow Street Press, 2005). Her poems and essays have appeared in literary journals and magazines including American Poetry Review, Harvard Review, Pleiades, Ploughshares, Rivendell, Slate, Threepenny Review, Salmagundi, The Southwest Review, The Threepenny Review, Yale Review, and the Review of Contemporary Fiction.

== Life ==
She earned her B.A. from Williams College, and her M.F.A. from Warren Wilson College. She taught at Beloit College, and worked in the Arts and Sciences at.Washington University in St. Louis International Writers Center. She is associate director of Four Way Books. She teaches at Arizona State University. She was a 2012 James Merrill House Fellow in Stonington, Connecticut.

== Honors and awards ==
- 2011 Arizona Commission on the Arts Fellowship
- 2007 Margaret Bridgman Fellow at Bread Loaf Writers' Conference

== Published works ==
Full-Length Poetry Collections

- Hold Sway, Barrow Street Press. Forthcoming April 2019.
- Annus mirabilis. Barrow Street Press. 2005. ISBN 978-0-9728302-4-9.
- Wreck Me, Barrow Street Press, 2013. ISBN 9780981987682

Anthology Publications

- Richard Howard; David Lehman, eds. (1995). "Nocturnal". The Best American Poetry 1995. Simon and Schuster. ISBN 978-0-684-80151-3.
