= James Longenbach =

American critic and poet

James Longenbach (Sept. 17, 1959 – July 29, 2022) was an American critic and poet. His early critical work focused on modernist poetry, namely that of Ezra Pound, W. B. Yeats, and Wallace Stevens, but came to include contemporary poetry as well. His book of criticism, The Resistance to Poetry, has been described as a "compact and exponentially provocative book." Longenbach published six volumes of poetry including Earthling (2017), which was a finalist for the National Book Critics Circle Award.

== Career ==
Longenbach received his bachelor's degree in 1981 from Trinity College in Hartford, Connecticut and subsequently received his Ph.D. from Princeton University.

Longenbach was Joseph Henry Gilmore Professor of English at the University of Rochester and taught at the University from 1985 until his death in 2022. His poems also appeared in many magazines and journals, including The New Yorker, The New Republic, The Nation, and The Yale Review, as well as The Best American Poetry 1995 anthology. Longenbach frequently reviewed books for Boston Review, The Nation, and the Los Angeles Times Book Review.

== Personal life ==
Longenbach was married to novelist Joanna Scott (and fellow Trinity graduate) whom he met in Rome, Italy, in 1981. Scott eventually taught in the English Department of the University of Rochester.

Longenbach died at age 62 from cancer on July 29, 2022, in Stonington, Connecticut. He was survived by his wife and their two daughters.

== Selected bibliography ==
Prose

- Modernist Poetics of History: Pound, Eliot, and the Sense of the Past (1987)
- Stone Cottage: Pound, Yeats & Modernism (1988; Oxford University Press)
- Ezra Pound’s Poetry and Prose: Contributions to Periodicals in Ten Volumes (1991) (co-editor)
- Wallace Stevens: The Plain Sense of Things (1991; Oxford University Press)
- Modern Poetry After Modernism (1997; Oxford University Press)
- The Resistance to Poetry (2005; University of Chicago Press)
- The Art of the Poetic Line (Dec. 2007; Graywolf Press)
- How Poems Get Made (2018; W.W. Norton & Company)
- The Lyric Now (2020; University of Chicago Press)

Poetry

- Threshold: Poems (1998; University of Chicago Press)
- Fleet River: Poems (2003; University of Chicago Press)
- Draft of a Letter: Poems (Apr. 2007; University of Chicago Press)
- the iron key: poems (2012; W.W. Norton & Company)
- earthling: poems (2017; W.W. Norton & Company)
- forever: poems (2021; W.W. Norton & Company)
- Seafarer: New Poems with “Earthling” and “Forever” (2024; W.W. Norton & Company)
