= Maxine Kumin =

American poet and author (1925–2014)

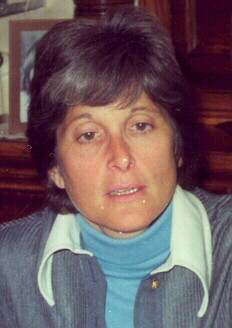
- Kumin in 1974
- Born: Maxine Winokur; June 6, 1925 Philadelphia, Pennsylvania, United States
- Died: February 6, 2014 (aged 88) Warner, New Hampshire, U.S.
- Occupation: Poet, author
- Education: Harvard University (BA, MA)
- Notable awards: Sarah Joseph Hale Award; Levinson Prize
- Spouse: Victor Kumin (married 1946–2014)
- Children: 3

Website
- www.maxinekumin.com

Maxine Kumin (June 6, 1925 – February 6, 2014) was an American poet and author. She was appointed Poet Laureate Consultant in Poetry to the Library of Congress in 1981–1982.

== Biography ==
=== Early years ===
Maxine Kumin was born Maxine Winokur on June 6, 1925 in Philadelphia, the daughter of Jewish parents, and attended a Catholic kindergarten and primary school. She received her B.A. in 1946 and her M.A. in 1948 from Radcliffe College of Harvard University. In June 1946 she married Victor Kumin, a Harvard graduate and engineering consultant; they had three children, two daughters and a son. In 1957, she studied poetry with John Holmes at the Boston Center for Adult Education. There she met Anne Sexton, with whom she started a friendship that continued until Sexton's suicide in 1974. Kumin taught English from 1958 to 1961 and 1965 to 1968 at Tufts University; from 1961 to 1963 she was a scholar at the Radcliffe Institute for Independent Study. She also held appointments as a visiting lecturer and poet in residence at many American colleges and universities. From 1976 until her death in February 2014, she and her husband lived on a farm in Warner, New Hampshire, where they bred Arabian and quarter horses.

=== Career ===
Kumin's many awards include the Eunice Tietjens Memorial Prize for Poetry (1972), the Pulitzer Prize for Poetry (1973) for Up Country, in 1995 the Aiken Taylor Award for Modern American Poetry, the 1994 Poets' Prize (for Looking for Luck), an American Academy and Institute of Arts and Letters Award for excellence in literature (1980), an Academy of American Poets fellowship (1986), the 1999 Ruth Lilly Poetry Prize, and six honorary degrees. In 1979, the Supersisters trading card set was produced and distributed; one of the cards featured Kumin's name and picture. She was also awarded the Sarah Joseph Hale Award and the Levinson Prize. She has also received a National Endowment for the Arts grant and fellowships from the Academy of American Poets. In 1981–1982, she served as the poetry consultant to the Library of Congress. Kumin has been published in Beloit Poetry Journal.

Critics have compared Kumin with Elizabeth Bishop because of her meticulous observations and with Robert Frost, for she frequently devotes her attention to the rhythms of life in rural New England. She has been grouped with confessional poets such as Anne Sexton, Sylvia Plath and Robert Lowell. But unlike the confessionalists, Kumin eschews high rhetoric and adopts a plain style. Throughout her career, Kumin has struck a balance between her sense of life's transience and her fascination with the dense physical presence of the world around her. She served as the 1985 judge of the Brittingham Prize in Poetry and she selected Patricia Dobler's Talking To Strangers.

She taught poetry in New England College's Low-Residency MFA Program. She was also a contributing editor at The Alaska Quarterly Review. Together with fellow-poet Carolyn Kizer, she first served on and then resigned from the board of chancellors of the Academy of American Poets, an act that galvanized the movement for opening this august body to broader representation by women and minorities.

In 1998 when Kumin was 73 she was almost killed in a horseback-riding accident which broke her neck.

Kumin, aged 88, died in February 2014 at her home in Warner, following a year of failing health.

Kumin is believed to be the last person to have seen Anne Sexton alive, as the two of them had had lunch the day of Sexton's suicide in 1974.

== Bibliography ==
=== Poetry ===
==== Collections ====
- Kumin, Maxine (1961). Halfway. New York: Holt, Rinehart and Winston.ISBN 9781111179694
- The Privilege, Harper & Row, 1965
- The Nightmare Factory, Harper & Row, 1970, ISBN 9780060124816
- The Abduction, Harper & Row, 1971, ISBN 9780060124724
- Up Country, Harper & Row, 1972 (illustrated by Barbara Swan)
- House, Bridge, Fountain, Gate, Viking/Penguin, 1975, ISBN 9780670379965
- The Retrieval System, Viking/Penguin, 1978, ISBN 9780670595761
- Our Ground Time Here Will Be Brief, New and Selected Poems, Viking/Penguin 1982, ISBN 9780140422986
- The Long Approach, Viking/Penguin, 1985–6, ISBN 9780670804290
- Nurture, Viking/Penguin 1989, ISBN 9780670824380
- Looking for Luck, W. W. Norton, 1992, ISBN 978-0-393-30947-8
- Connecting the Dots, W. W. Norton, 1996, ISBN 978-0-393-31695-7
- Selected Poems 1960–1990, W. W. Norton, 1997, ISBN 978-0-393-31836-4, cloth; paper; New York Times notable book of the year
- Maxine Kumin (17 May 2003). The Long Marriage: Poems. W. W. Norton. pp. 71–. ISBN 978-0-393-34799-9. cloth, paper; finalist for the Lenore Marshall Award of the Academy of American Poets, 2002
- Bringing Together: Uncollected Early Poems 1958–1988, W. W. Norton, 2003, ISBN 9780393326376
- Jack and Other New Poems, W. W. Norton, 2005, ISBN 9780393059564
- Still to Mow: Poems. W. W. Norton. 2 February 2009. pp. 68–. ISBN 978-0-393-34773-9.
- Where I Live: New & Selected Poems 1990-2010. W. W. Norton. 12 April 2010. ISBN 978-0-393-07649-3.
- And Short the Season, W. W. Norton, 2014, ISBN 978-0-393-24100-6

==== List of poems ====
Title	Year	First published	Reprinted/collected
Xanthopsia	2013	*Kumin, Maxine (July 1, 2013). "Xanthopsia". The New Yorker. Vol. 89, no. 19. p. 33.	

=== Novels ===
- Through Dooms of Love, Harper & Row, 1965; Hamish Hamilton & Gollancz (England), Panther paper
- The Passions of Uxport, Harper & Row, 1968, Dell paper, 1969
- The Abduction, Harper & Row, 1971 ISBN 9780060124724
- The Designated Heir, Viking, 1974; Andre Deutsch (England) ISBN 9780233966281
- Quit Monks or Die (animal rights mystery), Story Line Press, 1999, ISBN 9781885266774

=== Essays and short story collections ===
- To Make a Prairie: Essays on Poets, Poetry and Country Living, University of Michigan Press, 1980 paper ISBN 9780472063062
- Why Can't We Live Together Like Civilized Human Beings? Viking 1982 ISBN 9780670765539
- In Deep: Country Essays, Viking 1987, ISBN 9780670814312; Beacon Press 1988
- Women, Animals, and Vegetables: Essays and Stories, Norton, 1994; Ontario Review Press, paper, 1996 ISBN 9780865380844
- Telling the Barn Swallow: Poets on the Poetry of Maxine Kumin, ed. by Emily Grosholz, University Press of New England, 1997
- Always Beginning: Essays on a Life in Poetry, Copper Canyon Press, 2000, ISBN 9781556591419
- Inside the Halo and Beyond: The Anatomy of a Recovery. W. W. Norton. 17 November 2001. pp. 207–. ISBN 978-0-393-32261-3.
- The Roots of Things: Essays. Northwestern University Press. 30 March 2010. ISBN 978-0-8101-2648-0.

=== Children's books ===
- 1961 Follow the Fall (Illustrated by Artur Marokvia)
- 1961 Spring Things (Illustrated by Artur Marokvia)
- 1961 Summer Story (Illustrated by Artur Marokvia)
- 1961 A Winter Friend (Illustrated by Artur Marokvia)
- 1962 Mittens in May, Putnam (Illustrated by Elliott Gilbert)
- 1964 Sebastian and the Dragon (Illustrated by William D. Hayes)
- 1964 Speedy Digs Downside Up (Illustrated by Ezra Jack Keats)
- 1967 Faraway Farm (Illustrated by Kurt Werth)
- 1969 When Grandmother Was Young (Illustrated by Don Almquist)
- 1971 When Great-Grandmother Was Young (Illustrated by Don Almquist)
- 1984 The Microscope (Illustrated by Arnold Lobel), Harper & Row, 1984, ISBN 9780060235239
- 2006 Mites to Mastodons (Illustrated by Pam Zagarenski) ISBN 9780618507535
- What Color Is Caesar?. Candlewick Press. 2010. ISBN 978-0-7636-3432-2.
- 2011 Oh, Harry! (Illustrated by Barry Moser) ISBN 9781596434394

co-written with Anne Sexton

- 1963 Eggs of Things (Illustrated by Leonard Shortall), Scholastic Book Services
- 1964 More Eggs of Things (Illustrated by Leonard Shortall)
- 1974 Joey and the Birthday Present (Illustrated by Evaline Ness)
- 1975 The Wizard's Tears (Illustrated by Evaline Ness) ISBN 9781609808754

=== Memoirs ===
- The Pawnbroker's Daughter, W. W. Norton, July 2015, ISBN 978-0-393-24633-9
