= Michael J. Rosen =

American writer (born 1954)

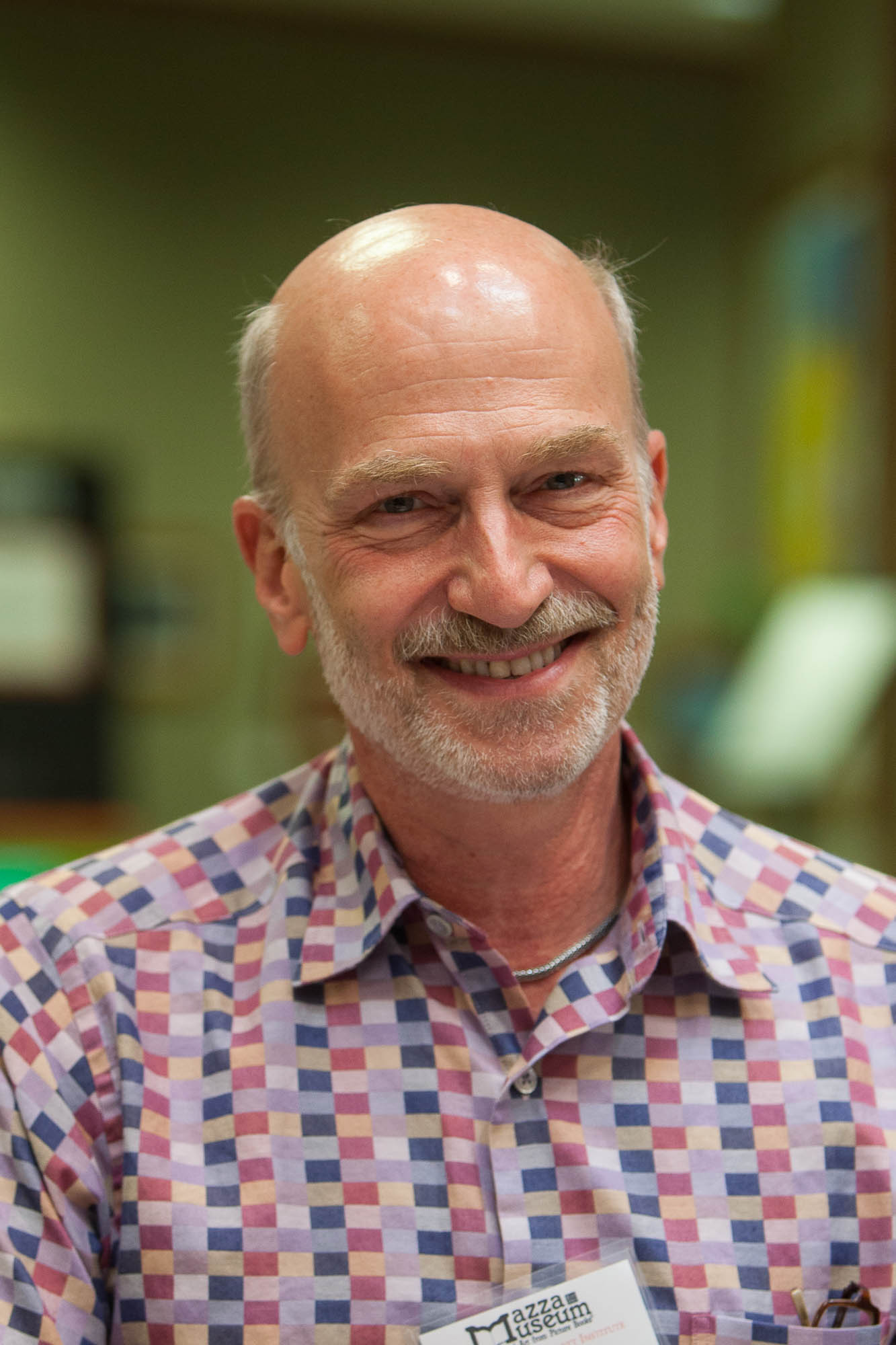
- Rosen in 2013
- Born: September 20, 1954 (age 72); Columbus, Ohio, USA
- Occupation: Writer

Michael J. Rosen (born September 20, 1954), is an American author, editor, illustrator, and visual artist. He has written books for children and adults, including picture books, poetry, nonfiction, and fiction, and has edited works of humor and the writings of James Thurber. His poetry has been featured in The Best American Poetry 1995.

== Early life ==
Rosen was born in Columbus, Ohio, the eldest of Marvin and Nona Rosen's three children. His childhood, and part of his adulthood, were filled with summer camp, an institution which he attended as a camper from age four to thirteen and as a counselor from fourteen to twenty-six. Rosen didn't enjoy team activities; he states that the more solitary activities at camp "spared me the uneasiness I felt when playing team sports ... I never realized that almost everyone there harbored some reason to feel uncomfortable." He was bullied through his school years. His favorite place at school was the art room, where he spent his free time; after school Rosen would continue with his artistic inclinations through drawing, collecting comics, and spending time at the advertising agency operated by his friend's father.

Rosen went to Kent State University for a year before transferring into the pre-med program at Ohio State University. He finished as an animal behavior major in 1976 and attended St. George's University School of Medicine in Grenada before working as an instructor for Ohio State University through 1985. During that time, he also attended Columbia University, earning his Masters in poetry in 1981.

== Career ==
Rosen started work as a design consultant for the Jefferson Center for Learning and the Arts in 1982. In 1983, he became the literary director of the Thurber House in Columbus, Ohio. Rosen was the editor for several compilations of James Thurber's writings; he also was involved in the creation of the Thurber Prize for American Humor. Rosen has also taught in the Ohio Art Council Poetry-in-the-Schools Program and Greater Columbus Arts Council Artist-in-the-Schools Program, and has conducted young authors' conferences, in-service days, workshops and residencies.

== Notable works ==
Rosen has been involved in the creation of over 150 books. He began his career as an author in 1984 with the publication of a book of poetry called A Drink at the Mirage. Rosen has written children’s books on religion (Our Eight Nights of Hanukkah; The Blessing of the Animals), books about dogs (With a Dog like That, a Kid like Me... ; The Company of Dogs: Twenty-one Stories by Contemporary Masters) and humorous fact books on various subjects (No Dribbling the Squid: Octopush, Skin Kicking, Elephant Polo and Other Oddball Sports; Balls!; The 60-Second Encyclopedia). His most popular works include Any Body's Guess!: Quirky Quizzes About What Makes You Tick, Mirth of a Nation: The Best Contemporary Humor, 101 Damnations: The Humorists' Tour of Personal Hells, The Cuckoo's Haiku, and Elijah's Angel: A Story for Chanukah and Christmas. Rosen says of his ideas, "A story must be a real enough house so that you can walk around, get comfortable, grab something from the fridge, and then be surprised by the ideas that haunt the place."

Rosen has illustrated several works, The Blessing of the Animals, Food Fight: Poets Join the Fight Against Hunger with Poems to Favorite Foods, and a variety for Gourmet (magazine) and The New Yorker.

== Books ==
Mirth of a Nation: The Best Contemporary Humor, originally published in 2000, is an anthology of contemporary humor written by over fifty comedians, writers, and other funny fellows, and edited by Rosen. Mirth of a Nation was reviewed by January Magazine, with Jonathan Shipley saying, “Michael Rosen ... has collected some funny writing. Seriously, it's good stuff.” Rosen said that “Mirth... and More Mirth of a Nation make another claim: That humor writing is seriously funny. Now of course I mean "genuinely" funny, but I also mean also "seriously" as in "profound" — humorists are among the few dependable sources of honest (re)calibration and reality checking.” The volume was published in 2002 as an audiobook, and in 2007 in hardcover format. Rosen also edited two additional humor anthologies in the same vein, More Mirth of a Nation (published November 2002), and May Contain Nuts (published September 2004).

The Cuckoo’s Haiku and Other Birding Poems is a book of haikus on birds, written by Rosen and illustrated by Stan Fellows. It was given a starred review by Publishers Weekly and Kirkus Reviews, as well as being named a Best Book of 2009 by Kirkus Reviews. It was nominated for the 2009 Cybils award for poetry and won the 2010 Ohioana Book Award for Juvenile Literature. Publishers Weekly’s review said of the book that “text and images, like a well-rehearsed duet, balance and echo each other’s beauty.”

Balls! is a humorous factbook about the history of "a host of spheroids (and one notable ellipse) that make the sporting world go round". Balls! has been reviewed by the National Center for the Study of Children's Literature and the Midwest Book Review. It was named a Junior Library Guild Premier Selection.

Elijah's Angel: A Story for Chanukah and Christmas is a tale about the friendship between a 9-year-old and an 80-year-old barber. The book's title character is based on Elijah Pierce, a barber nearby to whom both Rosen and the book's illustrator Aminah Robinson lived. The story received the National Jewish Book Award for Children Picture Book in 1993, was named an American Bookseller's Pick of the Lists, was designated by Parents' Magazine as the Best Book of 1992, and was the inspiration for a family opera by composer Robert Kapilow. Ari L. Goldman of The New York Times called the book "so finely done that the drawings and the story line compete for attention."

In 2013, Rosen was commissioned by the Jewish Community Center of Greater Columbus to create a full-length play based on this work.

== Awards ==
Rosen has received the National Jewish Book Award for Elijah's Angel: A Story for Chanukah and Christmas, the Simon Wiesenthal Museum of Tolerance Once Upon a World Book Award for A School for Pompey Walker, the Juvenile Literature Ohioana Library Award for The Heart Is Big Enough, and the Ohioana Library Career Citation in children's literature. He has accepted grants from the Jefferson Center for Learning and the Arts, the Ingram Merrill Foundation, the Ohio Arts Council and the National Endowment for the Arts. Additionally, he has been named a fellow to the Ohio Arts Council (in poetry) and the National Endowment for the Arts, and an Ingram Merrill fellow in poetry.

== Personal life ==
Rosen lives in Glenford, Ohio. His interests, around which his work sometimes centers, include dogs, cooking, and philanthropy. Because of his interest in and books about dogs, The Washington Post gave him the name of "fidosopher", a name he liked enough to appropriate it for his website.

=== Philanthropy ===
Rosen was named by The New York Times as "an example of creative philanthropy". Rosen has served on the board of directors for Share Our Strength for over fourteen years; the profits from six of the books he has created benefit the organization, including two cookbooks with recipes from over one hundred and fifty chefs. In 2005, his efforts were recognized by the organization with its first Lifetime Achievement Award.

Rosen established a granting program, The Company of Animals Fund, in 1990; the program "offered support to animal welfare agencies providing emergency or ongoing care to companion animals from the profits of seven books and two touring illustration exhibits." Rosen said, "It has been an enormous honor to precipitate such collections and a concomitant reward to know that these generated funds offer such lasting benefits. Rather than imagine this a unique design, I hope that such collective philanthropy becomes a perennial enterprise in publishing."
