= William Logan (poet) =

American poet, critic and scholar

- Born: 1950 (age 75–76); Boston, Massachusetts

Academic background
- Education: Yale University; University of Iowa

Academic work
- Discipline: Poetry
- Institutions: University of Florida

William Logan (born 1950) is an American poet, critic and scholar.

== Life ==
Logan was born in Boston, Massachusetts, to W. Donald Logan, Jr. and Nancy Damon Logan. He lives in Gainesville, Florida and Cambridge, England with his wife, the poet and artist, Debora Greger. Educated at Yale (BA, 1972) and the Iowa Writers' Workshop at the University of Iowa (MFA, 1975), he has authored eight books of poetry as well as five books of criticism.

== Work ==
He is a professor of creative writing at the University of Florida. Logan's poetry reviews have appeared in the New York Times Book Review. Many of these reviews have been quite controversial, leading Slate magazine to call him "the most hated man in American poetry... [and] its guiltiest pleasure". Logan's own poetry has received generally positive reviews. The poet Richard Tillinghast wrote, "when he manages to avoid obscurity, Mr. Logan writes with vigor, almost classical restraint and a fine sense of musicality." Logan's work has also received positive notices from The New York Times Book Review, Poetry and Publishers Weekly. In a review in Poetry magazine, Michael Scharf favorably compared the poetry from Logan's 1999 collection Night Battle with the work of the poet Geoffrey Hill.

== Reviews ==
Being a formalist poet himself, Logan's handful of positive reviews tend to go to well-established, conservative poets (usually deceased) who were/are masters of formal verse like Geoffrey Hill, Frederick Seidel, Robert Lowell, and Elizabeth Bishop. But he has also fiercely criticized other formalist poets like Les Murray and Derek Walcott and praised a few free verse poets like Louise Gluck and Anne Carson. Logan has been especially critical of popular free verse poets like Mary Oliver, Billy Collins, and Sharon Olds as well as more experimental poets like Jorie Graham and Rae Armantrout. Although he's best known for his often extreme reviews of poets, Logan has written some mixed reviews of poets like Kay Ryan, John Ashbery, and Frank O'Hara whom he has judged to be flawed but admirable.

== Awards ==
- National Book Critics Circle award for criticism
- Citation for Excellence in Reviewing from the National Book Critics Circle
- Peter I.B. Lavan Award from the Academy of American Poets
- John Masefield and Celia B. Wagner Awards from the Poetry Society of America
- J. Howard and Barbara M. J. Wood Prize from Poetry
- John William Corrington Award for Literary Excellence
- Amy Lowell Poetry Travelling Scholarship
- Aiken Taylor Award for Modern American Poetry 2013

== Bibliography ==
=== Poetry ===
- "Christ Among the Moneychangers, 1929", Poetry Foundation
- "from Punchinello in Chains: VI. Punchinello Dreams of Escape", Poetry Foundation
- "The Other Place", Poetry, April 2005
- "To a Wedding", Poetry, November 2008
- Sad-faced Men (1982)
- Difficulty (1985)
- Sullen Weedy Lakes (1988)
- Vain Empires (1998), a New York Times "notable book of the year"
- Night Battle (1999)
- Macbeth in Venice (2003)
- The Whispering Gallery (2005)
- Strange Flesh (2008)
- Madame X (2012)
- Rift of Light (2017)

=== Criticism ===
- All the Rage (1998)
- Reputations of the Tongue (1999)
- Desperate Measures (2002)
- The Undiscovered Country (2005)
- Our Savage Art (2009)
- Guilty Knowledge, Guilty Pleasure: The Dirty Art of Poetry (2014)
- Dickinson's Nerves, Frost's Woods: Poetry in the Shadow of the Past (2018)
- Broken Ground: Poetry and the Demon of History (2021)
