= Daniel Anderson (poet) =

American poet and educator

Daniel Anderson (born December 19, 1964) is an American poet and educator.

== Biography ==
Anderson, an Ohio native, holds degrees in English and Creative Writing from the University of Cincinnati and Johns Hopkins University. He is the author of three collections of poetry and the editor of Howard Nemerov's Selected Poems. He has held teaching positions at Murray State University, the University of the South, Kenyon College, the University of North Carolina, and the University of Alabama at Birmingham. Currently, he is professor at the University of Oregon, where he teaches in the graduate Creative Writing program. Anderson frequently serves as a faculty member at the Sewanee Writers' Conference.

== Awards ==
- National Endowment for the Arts Fellowship
- Nicholas Roerich Poetry Prize
- New Jersey State Council on the Arts Fellowship
- Pushcart Prize
- Bogliasco Fellowship

== Bibliography ==
=== Poetry collections ===
- Night Guard at the Wilberforce Hotel. Johns Hopkins University Press. 2014.
- Drunk In Sunlight. Johns Hopkins University Press. 2006.
- January Rain. Story Line Press. 1997.

=== Edited Collection ===
- The Selected Poems of Howard Nemerov. Ohio University Press. 2003.
