= Brittingham Prize in Poetry =

The Brittingham Prize in Poetry is a major American literary award for a book of poetry chosen from an open competition.

The prize, established in 1985, is sponsored by the English Department at the University of Wisconsin–Madison and is selected by a nationally recognized poet. The winner is published by the University of Wisconsin Press in its Wisconsin Poetry Series. Each winning poet receives $2,500 ($1,000 cash prize and $1,500 honorarium for a public reading of the work at the University of Wisconsin–Madison). The winner is announced in February each year. The prize is named for Thomas E. Brittingham and is made possible by a grant from his foundation. A $28.00 non-refundable reading fee must accompany each manuscript,

== Winners ==
- 1985: Jim Daniels, Places/Everyone
- 1986: Patricia Dobler, Talking To Strangers. Judge: Maxine Kumin
- 1987: David Kirby, Saving the Young Men of Vienna
- 1988: Lisa Zeidner, Pocket Sundial
- 1989: Stefanie Marlis, Slow Joy
- 1990: Judith Vollmer, Level Green
- 1991: Renée Ashley, Salt
- 1992: Tony Hoagland, Sweet Ruin
- 1993: Stephanie Strickland, The Red Virgin: A Poem of Simone Weil
- 1994: Lisa Lewis, The Unbeliever
- 1995: Lynn Powell, Old and New Testaments
- 1996: Juanita Brunk, Brief Landing on the Earth's Surface
- 1997: Olena Kalytiak Davis, And Her Soul Out of Nothing
- 1998: Suzanne Paola, Bardo
- 1999: Frank X. Gaspar, A Field Guide to the Heavens
- 2000: Greg Rappleye, A Path Between Houses
- 2001: Robin Behn, Horizon Note
- 2002: Anna George Meek, Acts of Contortion
- 2003: Brian Teare, The Room Where I Was Born. Judge: Kelly Cherry
- 2004: John Brehm, Sea of Faith
- 2005: Susanna Childress, Jagged with Love. Judge: Billy Collins
- 2007: Betsy Andrews, New Jersey. Judge: Linda Gregerson
- 2008: Philip Pardi, Meditations on Rising and Falling
- 2009: Angela Sorby, Bird Skin Coat. Judge: Marilyn Nelson
- 2010: Jennifer Boyden, The Mouths of Grazing Things. Judge: Robert Pinsky
- 2011: Alison Stine, Wait. Judge: Cornelius Eady
- 2012: Jazzy Danziger, Darkroom. Judge: Jean Valentine
- 2013: Greg Wrenn, Centaur. Judge: Terrance Hayes
- 2014: Joanne Diaz, My Favorite Tyrants. Judge: Naomi Shihab Nye
- 2015: Christina Stoddard, Hive
- 2016: Jennifer Whitaker, The Blue Hour
- 2017: Nick Lantz, You, Beast
- 2018: Max Garland, The Word We Used for It
- 2019: D. M. Aderibigbe, How the End First Showed
- 2020: Molly Spencer, If the House
- 2021: Diane Kerr, Perigee
- 2022: Daniel Khalastchi, American Parables
- 2023: Tacey M. Atsitty, (At) Wrist
- 2024: Caitlyn Roach, Surveille
- 2025: Lindsay Stuart Hill, World of Dew
- 2026: Colin Pope, Losers

== See also ==
- American poetry
- List of poetry awards
- List of literary awards
- List of years in poetry
- List of years in literature
