= Lewis Buzbee =

American author and poet

Lewis Buzbee is a San Francisco based author and poet. He is "a fourth generation California native on his mother’s side, and a Dust Bowl Okie on his father’s."

== Work ==
He is the author of the novels Fliegelman's Desire (1990), Steinbeck's Ghost (2008) and The Haunting of Charles Dickens (2010), the short story collection After the Gold Rush (2006) and the memoir The Yellow-Lighted Bookshop (2006). He is also the author of the children's book Bridge of Time (2012). Buzbee's work has appeared in The Paris Review, Harper's, The New York Times Book Review, GQ and ZYZZYVA. His poem "Sunday, Tarzan in His Hammock" was featured in Best American Poetry 1995.

Buzbee currently teaches in the MFA in Creative Writing program at the University of San Francisco. He is married to Canadian poet Julie Bruck.
