= Aiken Taylor Award for Modern American Poetry =

American poetry award

The Aiken Taylor Award for Modern American Poetry is an annual prize, administered by the Sewanee Review and the University of the South, awarded to a writer who has had a substantial and distinguished career. It was established through a bequest by Dr. K.P.A. Taylor, a poet and younger brother of Conrad Aiken.

== Winners ==
- 1987 — Howard Nemerov
- 1988 — Richard Wilbur
- 1989 — Anthony Hecht
- 1990 — W. S. Merwin
- 1991 — John Frederick Nims
- 1992 — Gwendolyn Brooks
- 1993 — George Starbuck
- 1994 — Wendell Berry
- 1995 — Maxine Kumin
- 1997 — Fred Chappell
- 1998 — X. J. Kennedy
- 1999 — George Garrett
- 2000 — Eleanor Ross Taylor
- 2001 — Frederick Morgan
- 2002 — Grace Schulman
- 2003 — Daniel Hoffman
- 2004 — Henry Taylor
- 2005 — B.H. Fairchild
- 2006 — Brendan Galvin
- 2007 — Anne Stevenson
- 2008 — John Haines
- 2009 — Donald Hall
- 2010 — Louise Glück
- 2011 — Billy Collins
- 2012 — Debora Greger
- 2013 — William Logan
- 2014 — Dana Gioia
- 2015 — Marie Ponsot
- 2016 — Christian Wiman
- 2017 — Mary Ruefle
- 2018 — Heather McHugh
- 2019 — Carl Phillips
- 2020 — Nikky Finney
- 2021 — Vievee Francis

== See also ==
- American poetry
- List of poetry awards
- List of literary awards
- List of years in poetry
- List of years in literature
