= Erin McGraw =

American author

- Born: 1957 (age 68–69); Redondo Beach, California, U.S.
- Education: Indiana University Bloomington (MFA)
- Spouse: Andrew Hudgins
- Writing career
- Notable works: The Baby Tree, The Seamstress of Hollywood Boulevard, Better Food for a Better World
- Notable awards: Wallace Stegner Fellow at Stanford University

Erin McGraw (born 1957) is an American author, known primarily for works of fiction, both short stories and novels. Her generous, genial works often depicts familial relations with cold-eyed optimism.

== Work ==
Her first book, the story collection Bodies at Sea (1989), features a range of characters from a coal miner to college professor who engage in surprising actions. Her next story collection, Lies of the Saints (1996), which explores themes including marriage and parenthood through quirky stories about endearing misfits, was described by The New York Times as a "gratifyingly substantial" work featuring "savvy, sardonic women". The Good Life (2004), which features characters battling daily demons of envy, fear, and disillusionment while somehow maintaining an abiding optimism. Her novels include The Baby Tree (2002), The Seamstress of Hollywood Boulevard (2008), which draws on her own family history to describe the price one woman pays for independence, and Better Food for a Better World (2013), the story of six idealistic college friends who band together to open the Natural High Ice Cream parlor only to find life intruding on their dreams, until ... . Her short work has appeared in The Atlantic Monthly, Good Housekeeping, The Southern Review, and The Kenyon Review.

== Awards ==
A former Wallace Stegner Fellow at Stanford University (1988–90), she has received fellowships from the Ohio Arts Council and the corporations of MacDowell and Yaddo.

== Personal life ==
Born and raised in Redondo Beach, California, McGraw received her MFA at Indiana University Bloomington and has lived in the Midwest ever since. Now an emeritus member of the faculty, McGraw taught in the MFA in Creative Writing program at the Ohio State University alongside her husband, the poet Andrew Hudgins, until her retirement.

== Bibliography ==
=== Novels ===
- The Baby Tree (2002)
- The Seamstress of Hollywood Boulevard (2008)
- Better Food for a Better World (2013)

=== Collections ===
- Bodies at Sea (1989)
- Lies of the Saints (1996)
- The Good Life (2004)

=== Short fiction and essays ===
Title	Year	First published	Reprinted/collected
Punchline	2011	McGraw, Erin (Fall 2011). "Punchline". The Kenyon Review. 33 (4).	Henderson, Bill, ed. (2013). "Punchline". The Pushcart Prize XXXVII : best of the small presses 2013. Pushcart Press. pp. 50–64.
Bad Eyes	1998	McGraw, Erin (Spring 1998). "Bad Eyes". Gettysburg Review. 11: 89–98. Archived from the original on 2015-07-14.	
