= Gilbert Dahan =

French historian

Gilbert Dahan is a French historian of religions, director of research at the CNRS and at the École pratique des hautes études. He is notably a recognized medievalist. His work has renewed studies on the exegesis of the Bible in the Christian West during the Middle Ages.

He is also a specialist of Bernhard Blumenkranz's work.

== Selected publications ==
- 1990: Les Intellectuels chrétiens et les Juifs au Moyen Âge, Éditions du Cerf, 648 p.
- 1991: La polémique chrétienne contre le judaïsme au Moyen Âge, Albin Michel, 148 p.
- 1998: La rhétorique d'Aristote: traditions et commentaires de l'Antiquité aux XIIe siècle (under the direction of G. Dahan and I. Rosier-Catach), Vrin, 360 p.
- 1999: L’Exégèse chrétienne de la Bible en Occident médiéval, XIIe–XIVe siècles, Cerf, 490 p.
- Le brûlement du Talmud à Paris 1242 - 1244 (under the direction of Gilbert Dahan), Cerf, Paris,
- 2000: Les Mages et les bergers (en collaboration), Cerf 128 p.
- 2001: L'Occident médiéval, lecteur de l'Écriture, Cerf, 100 p.
- 2004: L'Expulsion des Juifs de France (1394) - under the direction of Gilbert Dahan, Cerf, 272 p.
- 2009: Lire la Bible au Moyen Âge - Essais d'herméneutique médiévale, Droz, Geneva 448 p.
- 2012 L’Épître de Jacques dans sa tradition d'exégèse, Cerf, 162 p.

== See also ==
History of the Jews in France

=== External links ===
- Recension de l'ouvrage Les Intellectuels chrétiens et les Juifs au Moyen Âge by Dominique Poirel on the site Persée
- « L'exégèse monastique au Moyen Âge », lecture by Gilbert Dahan at the Institut Rachi, 2011
- « Exégèses juive et chrétienne au Moyen Âge », lecture by Gilbert Dahan on the site Akadem
