= Laurence Goldstein =

American poet

- Born: 1943; Los Angeles, California
- Died: April 16, 2023 (aged 79–80)
- Education: UCLA; Brown University

Laurence Goldstein (1943 – April 16, 2023) was a poet, editor, and professor in the University of Michigan Department of English Language and Literature. Born in Los Angeles, California in 1943, he received a B.A. from UCLA in 1965 and a Ph.D from Brown University in 1970. Beginning in 1977, Goldstein was the chief editor of the Michigan Quarterly Review, an academic journal featuring new writing by prominent critics, essayists, poets, and fiction writers. Goldstein stepped down as editor after its Spring 2009 issue.

Goldstein wrote and/or edited several books of literary criticism (including work on romantic poetry, technology and literature, and film and literature), and published four volumes of poetry: Altamira, in 1978; The Three Gardens, in 1987; Cold Reading, in 1995; and A Room in California, in 2005.

Discussing poems about cinema in his book The American Poet at the Movies (1994), Goldstein remarks, "Poems about the movies are acts of reflection, acts of completion, asking in turn for readers willing to engage *their* unique and complex reality. What follows, then, is the first effort to undertake the journey down to the mouth of Plato's cave and speak with several generations of emerging poets about the mysterious shadows inscribed in the living body of their imagination."

Laurence Goldstein died April 16, 2023, in Ann Arbor, Michigan.
