= Tony Sanders =

American poet

Tony Sanders (2 May 1957 in New York City – 11 February 2015) was an American poet.

== Life ==
Born on May 2, 1957, in New York City, he was educated at Phillips Andover Academy, Yale University, The Iowa's Writer's Workshop and University of Houston. Sanders published four collections of poetry, including the collection of prose poems Subject Matters, and a collaboration of verse with his dear friend and fellow poet Chard deNiord. Sanders' poetry appeared in numerous publications including Poetry, Paris Review, The Yale Review, The Gettysburg Review and The New York Times Book Review. Ten of his poems were nominated for Pushcart Prizes.

He lived in New York City and Vermont. Sanders was a member of The National Arts Club and Poets House.

== Awards ==
- 1992 Bernard F. Connors Prize for Poetry

== Works ==
- Partial eclipse: a book of poetry. University of North Texas Press. 1994. ISBN 978-0-929398-81-5.
- Transit authority: poems. Grove Press. 2000. ISBN 978-0-8021-3677-0.
- Warning Track. Turtle Point Press. 2004. ISBN 1-885586-96-5.

=== Anthologies ===
- Richard Howard; David Lehman, eds. (1995). The Best American Poetry 1995. Simon & Schuster. ISBN 978-0-684-80151-3.
