= Lisa Lewis =

American poet (born 1956)

- Born: 1956 (age 68–69) Roanoke, Virginia, U.S.
- Occupation: Poet, professor
- Notable awards: Brittingham Prize in Poetry (1994)

Lisa Lewis is an American poet and professor, born 1956 in Roanoke, Virginia.

== Biography ==
Lewis is the author of six books of poetry and is the director of the creative writing program at Oklahoma State University. In 2011, she received an Individual Artist's Fellowship from the National Endowment for the Arts. She is the Editor in Chief and Poetry Editor of The Cimarron Review. Her first book, The Unbeliever, was published as winner of the Brittingham Prize in Poetry in 1994. Silent Treatment, winner of the National Poetry Series, appeared from Viking/Penguin in 1998. New Issues Poetry & Prose published Vivisect in 2010, and Burned House with Swimming Pool, appeared as winner of The American Poetry Review Prize in 2011. In 2016, The Body Double appeared from Georgetown Review Press. In 2017, Lewis received the Tenth Gate Prize, a prize awarded each year to an exceptional manuscript by a mid-career poet with at least two previous books, from the Word Works.
