= Marie Ponsot =

American poet (1921–2019)

- Born: Marie Birmingham; April 6, 1921; Brooklyn, New York, U.S.
- Died: July 5, 2019 (aged 98); Manhattan, New York, U.S.
- Occupations: Poet; literary critic; essayist; teacher; translator
- Spouse: Claude Ponsot (div. 1970)
- Children: 7

Marie Ponsot /ˌpɒnˈsoʊ/ (née Birmingham; April 6, 1921 – July 5, 2019) was an American poet, literary critic, essayist, teacher, and translator. Her awards and honors included the National Book Critics Circle Award, Delmore Schwartz Memorial Prize, the Robert Frost Poetry Award, the Shaughnessy Medal of the Modern Language Association, the Ruth Lilly Poetry Prize from the Poetry Foundation, and the Aiken Taylor Award for Modern American Poetry.

== Life ==
Ponsot was born in Brooklyn, New York, the daughter of Marie Candee, a public school teacher, and William Birmingham, an importer. She grew up in Jamaica, Queens along with her brother. She was already writing poems as a child, some of which were published in the Brooklyn Daily Eagle. After graduating from St. Joseph's College for Women in Brooklyn, Ponsot earned her master's degree in seventeenth-century literature from Columbia University. After the Second World War, she journeyed to Paris, where she met and married Claude Ponsot, a painter and student of Fernand Léger. The couple lived in Paris for three years, during which time they had a daughter. Her friend the American poet Lawrence Ferlinghetti published her first book of poetry, True Minds, in 1956. Later, Ponsot and her husband relocated to the United States. The couple went on to have six sons before divorcing. She was left with seven children and she was not publishing her poetry. (Years later Claude Ponsot, by then a professor, became chairman at the fine arts department of St. John's University in Queens, New York.)

Upon returning from France, Ponsot worked as a freelance writer of radio and television scripts. She also translated 69 children's books from the French, including The Fables of La Fontaine.

She co-authored with Rosemary Deen two books about the fundamentals of writing, Beat Not the Poor Desk and Common Sense.

Ponsot taught a poetry thesis class, as well as writing classes, at the Poetry Center of the 92nd Street Y. She also taught at the YMCA, Beijing United University, New York University, and Columbia University, and she served as an English professor at Queens College in New York, from which she retired in 1991.

She was the Chancellor of the Academy of American Poets from 2010 to 2014.

Ponsot lived in New York City until her death at NewYork–Presbyterian Hospital on July 5, 2019.

Ponsot was a mentor to many younger poets and writers. Sapphire wrote an essay in her honor for an event celebrating the 2009 publication of Ponsot's collection entitled Easy. Poet Marilyn Hacker has described her as being "one of the major poets of her generation." Ponsot was also a lifelong friend and mentor to Hacker and science fiction writer Samuel R. Delany.

== Awards ==
Ponsot authored several collections of poetry, including The Bird Catcher (1998), a finalist for the 1999 Lenore Marshall Poetry Prize and the winner of the National Book Critics Circle Award, and Springing: New and Selected Poems (2002), which was named a "notable book of the year" by The New York Times Book Review.

Among her awards were a creative writing grant from the National Endowment for the Arts, the Delmore Schwartz Memorial Prize, The Robert Frost Poetry Award, the Shaughnessy Medal of the Modern Language Association, the 2013 Ruth Lilly Poetry Prize from the Poetry Foundation, and the 2015 Aiken Taylor Award for Modern American Poetry.

== Selected bibliography ==
- True Minds, City Lights Pocket Bookshop, (1956)
- Admit Impediment, Knopf, (1981)
- The Green Dark, Knopf, (1988) ISBN 978-0-394-57054-9
- The Bird Catcher, Knopf, (1998) ISBN 978-0-375-40135-0
- Springing: New and Selected Poems, A.A. Knopf, (2002) ISBN 978-0-375-41389-6
- Easy: Poems. Random House, Inc. 2009. ISBN 978-0-307-27218-8.
- Collected Poems, Knopf (2016) ISBN 978-1101947678.

=== Translations ===
- Jean de La Fontaine (2002). Benjamin Ivry (ed.). Love & folly: selected fables and tales of LaFontaine. Translator Marie Ponsot. Welcome Rain Publishers. ISBN 978-1-56649-227-0.
- Hans Christian Andersen (1958). The Fairy tale book: a selection of twenty-eight traditional stories from the French, German, Danish, Russian, and Japanese. Translator Marie Ponsot. Simon and Schuster.
- Chinese Fairy Tales, Ideals Children's Books (1988) ISBN 978-0824981594

=== Non-fiction ===
- Ponsot, Marie; Deen, Rosemary (1982). Beat Not the Poor Desk: Writing: What to Teach, How to Teach It, and Why. Boynton/Cook Publishers. ISBN 978-0-86709-009-3.
- Deen, Rosemary; Ponsot, Marie (1985). The Common Sense: What to Write, How to Write It, and Why. Boynton/Cook. ISBN 978-0-86709-079-6.
