= Olena Kalytiak Davis =

American poet

- Олена Калитяк Девіс
- Born: September 16, 1963 (age 62); United States
- Education: Wayne State University, University of Michigan Law School, and Vermont College of Fine Arts
- Writing career
- Language: English
- Genre: Poetry
- Notable work: And Her Soul Out Of Nothing
- Notable awards: Brittingham Prize in Poetry, 1997; Rona Jaffe Foundation Writers' Award, 1996

Olena Kalytiak Davis (Note: Ukrainian: Олена Калитяк Девіс, romanized: Olena Kalytiak Devis) (born September 16, 1963) is a Ukrainian-American poet. Davis is the author of five poetry collections, her most recent being Late Summer Ode. Her collection The Poem She Didn't Write And Other Poems (2014, Copper Canyon Press) was a 2014 Lannan Literary Selection. Her first book, And Her Soul Out Of Nothing, won the Brittingham Prize (University of Wisconsin Press). Her second book, the cult classic shattered sonnets love cards and other off and back handed importunities (2003, Tin House Books), was republished by Copper Canyon Press in 2014.

Her honors include a 2004 Guggenheim Fellowship in poetry and a 1996 Rona Jaffe Foundation Writers' Award in poetry.

Her poems have been published in literary journals and magazines including AGNI, A Small Number, New England Review, Tin House, Poetry Northwest, Michigan Quarterly Review, Field, Indiana Review, Post Road Magazine and in anthologies including Best American Poetry 1995 and Legitimate Dangers: American Poets of the New Century (Sarabande Books).

Davis is a first-generation Ukrainian-American, and she grew up in Detroit. She was educated at Wayne State University, University of Michigan Law School, and Vermont College of Fine Arts. She is also a contributing editor at The Alaska Quarterly Review. She has lived in San Francisco, Prague, Lviv, Paris, Chicago, and the Yup'ik community of Bethel, Alaska, and currently lives in Anchorage, Alaska, where she works as a lawyer.

== Published works ==
- 1997 And Her Soul Out of Nothing (winner of the Brittingham Prize in Poetry, published by the University of Wisconsin Press)
- 2003 Shattered Sonnets, Love Cards, and Other Off-And-Back Handed Importunities (poetry) Portland, OR:Tin House Books. ISBN 1-58234-352-7
- 2009 On the Kitchen Table from Which Everything Has Been Hastily Removed. Published by Hollyridge Press. ISBN 978-0-9799588-8-5
- 2014 The Poem She Didn't Write And Other Poems, Published by Copper Canyon Press. ISBN 978-1-55659-459-5
- 2014 shattered sonnets love cards and other back handed importunities, Republished by Copper Canyon Press. ISBN 978-1-55659-440-3
- 2022 Late Summer Ode, Published by Copper Canyon Press. ISBN 978-1556596476
