= Judith Hall (poet) =

American poet

Judith Hall is an American poet.

== Biography ==
Judith Hall is the author of five poetry collections, including To Put The Mouth To (William Morrow), selected for the National Poetry Series by Richard Howard; Three Trios , her translations of the imaginary poet JII (Northwestern); and, most recently, Prospects (LSU Press). She also collaborated with David Lehman on Poetry Forum (Bayeaux Arts) which she illustrated.

She directed the PEN Syndicated Fiction Project and was senior program specialist for literary publishing at the National Endowment for the Arts. Since 1995, she has served as poetry editor of Antioch Review , and her poems have appeared in The Atlantic , American Poetry Review , The New Republic , The Paris Review , Poetry, The Progressive , and other journals, and in the Pushcart Prize and Best American Poetry anthology series.

She taught at UCLA and the Art Center College of Design and, for many years, at the California Institute of Technology, after moving to New York, she taught at the Columbia University Graduate School of the Arts. Hall received awards from the National Endowment for the Arts and the Guggenheim and Ingram Merrill Foundations.

== Awards ==
- 2006 Guggenheim Fellowship
- NEA Fellowship
- Pushcart Prize
- Ingram Merrill Fellowship
- 1991 National Poetry Series

== Works ==
=== Poetry ===
- To Put the Mouth To. William Morrow & Co. 1992. ISBN 978-0-688-11546-3.
- Anatomy, Errata. Ohio State University Press. 1998. ISBN 978-0-8142-0764-2.
- The Promised Folly. Northwestern University Press. 2003. ISBN 978-0-8101-5136-9.
- ——; J II (2006). Three Trios. Translated by Judith Hall. Northwestern University Press. ISBN 978-0-8101-5180-2.
- ——; David Lehman (2007). Poetry Forum: A Play Poem: a Pl'em. Illustrator Judith Hall. Bayeux Arts. ISBN 978-1-896209-79-1.
- Prospects. LSU Press. 2020. ISBN 978-0-8071-7263-6.

=== Poem-eo (Poem Video) ===
- “Natural / Work Hard / Ability”, LSU Press on Vimeo

=== List of Poems ===
- "The God that Took the Place of Pleasure", Boston Review, DECEMBER 2004/JANUARY 2005
- "SO"; "GARMENTS OF GLADNESS IN A MIME OF TERROR"; "LAMENT", Inertia Magazine
- "The Morning After the Afternoon of a Faun", Ploughshares, Spring 2007
- "The Girl's Will; or Optimism", Poesy Galore
- "Worship of Mars"; "Worship of Venus", Jacket 19, October 2002

=== Prose ===
- Jonathan F.S. Post, ed. (2013). The Oxford Handbook of Shakespeare's Poetry. Oxford University Press. ISBN 978-0-19-960774-7.
- Hilda Raz, ed. (1999). Living On the Margins. Persea Books. ISBN 0-89255-244-1.

=== Anthologies ===
- Richard Howard; David Lehman, eds. (1995). The Best American Poetry 1995. Simon and Schuster. ISBN 978-0-684-80151-3.

== See also ==
- Feminist poets
