= Gail Mazur =

American poet

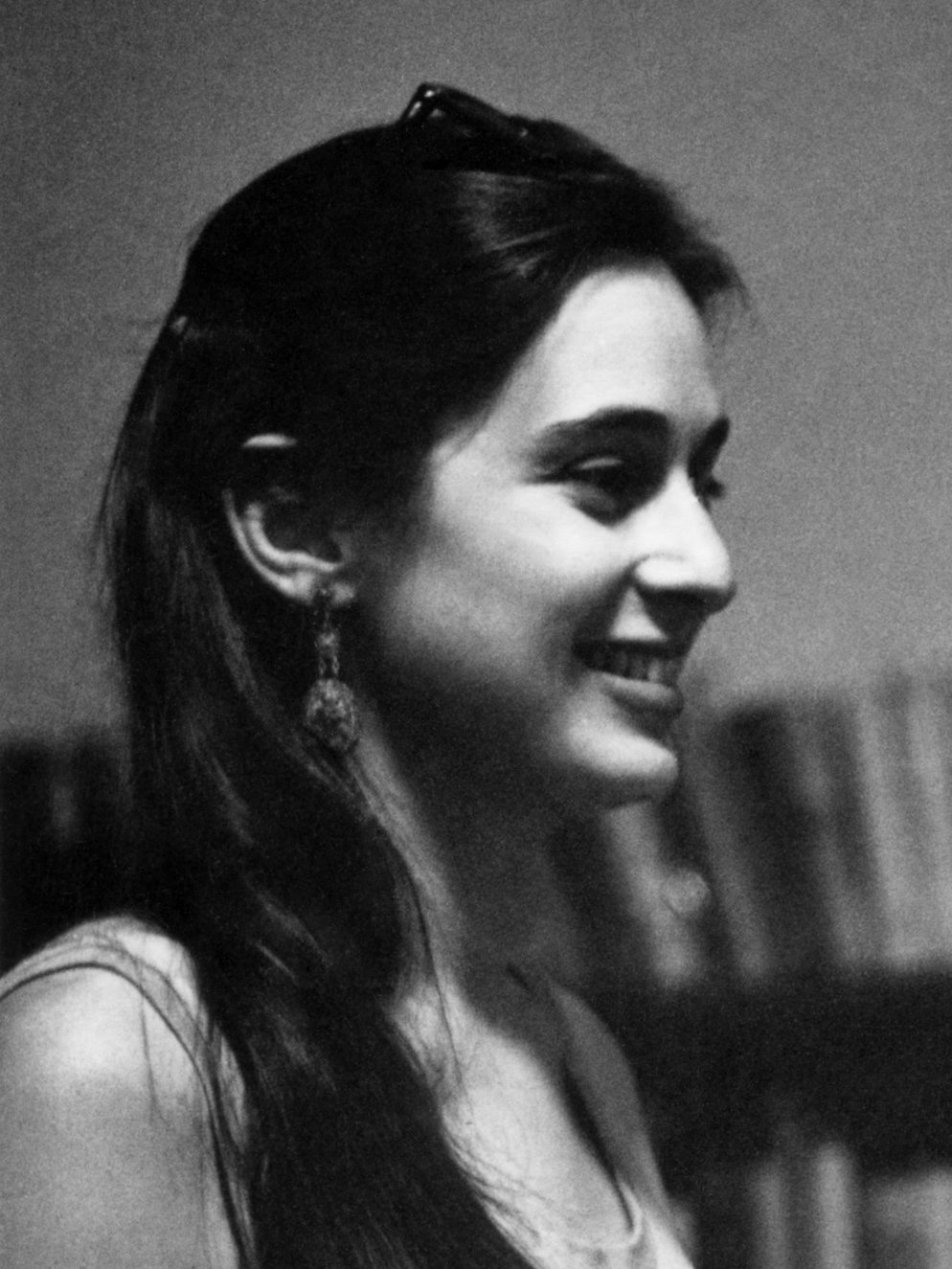
- Mazur in the 1960s
- Born: 1937 (age 88–89)
- Education: Smith College (1959)
- Occupation: Poet
- Spouse: Michael Mazur

Gail Mazur (b. 1937) is an American poet born and raised in Massachusetts. She has published seven books of poetry, and They Can't Take That Away From Me (2001) was a finalist for the National Book Award for Poetry.

== Career ==
Mazur graduated from Smith College in Massachusetts in 1959. As of 2021, she taught creative writing in Boston University's MFA program. From 1995 to 2016, she was the senior distinguished writer-in-residence at Emerson College.

In 1968, Mazur and her husband, Michael Mazur, co-founded Artists Against Racism and the War. Mazur founded the Blacksmith House Poetry series in 1973 and directed it for 29 years. She founded the series in part to help writers feel less isolated and encourage a fellowship of poets.

== Awards and honors ==
Mazur was awarded a literature fellowship from the National Endowment for the Arts in 1977. They Can't Take That Away From Me (2001) was a finalist for the National Book Award for Poetry; the citation said the book was "mordant and passionate, narrative and meditative". In 2005, she received the St. Botolph Club Foundation's Distinguished Artist Award. Her collection Zeppo's First Wife: New and Selected Poems won the Massachusetts Book award and was a finalist for the 2005 Los Angeles Times Book Prize for Poetry.

Mazur was The Carl and Lily Pforzheimer Foundation Fellow 2008-2009 at the Harvard Radcliffe Institute.

== Reception ==
In a review of The Common (1995), Jennifer Clarvoe wrote that the poems in the fourth section "confront and do not soften the impact of genuine hurt and death and loss". At Harvard Review, Tina Barr wrote that in Zeppo's First Wife (2005), Mazur's poems let readers encounter "the recognition of the importance of a civil conscience all but lost from the larger culture". In Land's End (2020), several poems are set in Provincetown, Massachusetts. Writing at The Provincetown Independent, Susan Brown writes that the collection builds "a palette of primal elements ... to express the yearnings of mortality." Mazur wrote Forbidden City after the death of her of her husband. Joyce Peseroff, writing at On the Seawall, wrote that Mazur's poems in this collection reflect how art and imagination can give relief from sorrow. At Hyperallergic, John Yau noticed that Mazur never analyzes her feelings in Forbidden City (2016), which makes the poetry more powerful.

== Bibliography ==
List taken from Mazur's profile on the Boston University website.

- Nightfire David Godine Publisher, 1978
- The Pose of Happiness David Godine, Publisher, 1986
- The Common University of Chicago Press, 1995
- They Can't Take That Away from Me University of Chicago, 2001,
- Zeppo's First Wife: New and Selected Poems Univ. Chicago, 2005
- Figures in a Landscape University of Chicago Press, 2011
- Forbidden City University of Chicago Press, 2016
- Land's End: New and Selected Poems 2020
