= William Carpenter (writer) =

American poet and author

- Born: October 31, 1940 (age 85); Melrose, MA, US
- Education: Dartmouth College (BA); University of Minnesota (PhD)
- Occupations: poet, novelist, teacher
- Spouse: Donna Gold (1990-present) Joanne Carpenter (1962-1980)
- Children: Matthew, Daniel
- Writing career
- Genres: poetry, fiction
- Notable work: Silence, Wooden Nickel, A Keeper of Sheep, Rain, Girl Writing a Letter
- Notable awards: Associated Writing Program's Contemporary Poetry Award, 1980; Samuel French Morse Prize, 1985; National Endowment for the Arts grant, 1985; The New York Public Library “Books for the Teen Age,” 1995
- Literary movement: College of the Atlantic
- Website: williamcarpenterbooks.com

William Carpenter (born October 31, 1940) is a poet, novelist, professor, and co-founder of the College of the Atlantic in Bar Harbor, Maine, where he worked on the faculty for 48 years. He retired in 2019.

== Novels ==
Carpenter's first novel, A Keeper of Sheep, was published in 1994. It follows a college student who, after setting fire to the site of a fraternity gang rape, moves to Cape Cod. During her time living there, she becomes involved in caring for a composer who is dying of AIDS.

His second novel, The Wooden Nickel, published in 2002, follows Lucky Lunt, a Maine lobsterman who fishes in an old wooden boat.

Carpenter's third novel, Silence, was published in 2021 and follows Nick, an Iraq War veteran who became deaf after an IED explosion. Returning to his Maine hometown, haunted by images of combat, he finds work and some solace on nearby Amber Island.

Silence received an Independent Publishers Book Award for Military/Wartime Fiction, and was selected by The Miramichi Reader as a 2021 ‘Pick’. It was also the Foreword INDIES Book of the Year in the War & Military category, and a finalist for the 2022 Maine Writers and Publishers Alliance fiction award.

== Poetry ==
William Carpenter's first volume of poetry, The Hours of Morning, was published in 1981 and won the 1980 Associated Writing Program's Contemporary Poetry Award.

Rain, Carpenter’s second volume of poetry, was published in 1985 and won the Samuel French Morris Prize.

His third book of poetry, Speaking Fire at Stones (1992), was written in collaboration with the artist Robert Shetterly. The volume received positive reviews and was cited as the inspiration for a wine label.

== Biography ==
Carpenter was born in Melrose, Massachusetts and grew up in Waterville, Maine. his father, James Carpenter, chartered the art department at Colby College and launched the Colby Museum of Art. Carpenter graduated from Dartmouth, received a PhD at the University of Minnesota and taught at the University of Chicago as Assistant Professor of English and Humanities. During his work at the University of Chicago, Carpenter received the Inland Steel Postdoctoral Fellowship. In 1971 he returned to Maine as the first faculty member hired by College of the Atlantic.

Upon his retirement, the Maine State Legislature recognized William Carpenter with a "legislative sentiment" (SLS 654), an award given to Mainers for their achievements. At the Statehouse ceremony, Senator Erin Herbig said, "Over the past half century, Bill has taught world literature, Shakespeare, creative writing, history, film, Maine mythology, poetry and more to generations of students. Thank you for inspiring present and future leaders, instilling a passion for literature and creative writing in your students and enriching the great State of Maine we all know and love."

== Anthologies ==
Carpenter’s poetry has been anthologized in the following volumes

- In the Footsteps of a Shadow (MadHat, 2025)
- North Woods at Night: Literary Reflections on Maine’s Largest Forest (12 Willows Press 2024)
- Rivers of Ink: Literary Reflections on the Penobscot (12 Willows Press 2023)
- William Irvine: At Home (Marshall Wilkes Fine Art Publishers 2018)
- Nach Wörteralgen Taucht der Dichter (Residenz Verlag, 2004)
- The Poetry of Solitude: A Tribute to Edward Hopper (Universe Books, 2003)
- The Breath of Parted Lips (CavanKerry, 2001)
- Silent Places: A Tribute to Edward Hopper (Universe Books, 2000)
- Night Out (Milkweed, 1997, ISBN 978-1-57131-405-5)
- Literature: An Introduction to Critical Reading (Prentice-Hall, 1996)
- Real Things An Anthology of Popular Culture in American Poetry (Indiana University press, 1996)
- Hard Choices (University of Iowa press, 1996)
- The Best American Poetry 1995
- The Quotable Moose : a contemporary Maine Reader (Down University Press of New England, 1994)
- The Maine Poets (Down East, 1993)
- Vital Signs (University of Wisconsin press, 1989)
