= Debora Greger =

American poet and artist (born 1949)

- Born: 1949 (age 76–77); Walsenburg, Colorado, United States
- Education: University of Washington
- Scientific career
- Fields: Poet
- Workplaces: University of Florida

Debora Greger (born 1949) is an American poet as well as a visual artist.

She was raised in Richland, Washington. She attended the University of Washington and then the Iowa Writers' Workshop. She then went on to hold fellowships at the Fine Arts Work Center in Provincetown and at Harvard University's Radcliffe Institute for Advanced Study. She was professor of English and creative writing at the University of Florida until retiring. She now works as Poet in Residence at the Harn Museum of Art.

Her poetry has been included in six volumes of The Best American Poetry and she has exhibited her artwork at several galleries and museums across the country. She also has a poem on Poetry 180 in number 42. Her work appeared in Paris Review, The Nation, Poetry, and The New Criterion.

She lives in Gainesville, Florida and Cambridge, England with her life-partner, the poet and critic, William Logan.

== Awards ==
- 2012: Aiken Taylor Award for Modern American Poetry
- 2004: John William Corrington Award for Literary Excellence, Centenary College
- 1996: Lenore Marshall Poetry Prize, Finalist
- 1991: National Endowment for the Arts Fellowship
- 1990: Award in Literature from the American Academy and Institute of Arts and Letters
- 1988: Brandeis University Poetry Award
- 1987: Academy of American Poets' Peter I.B. Lavan Award
- 1987: Fellowship from the John Simon Guggenheim Memorial Foundation
- 1985: National Endowment for the Arts Fellowship
- 1982: Amy Lowell Poetry Traveling Scholarship
- 1979: "Discovery"/The Nation Poetry Prize
- 1977: Fine Arts Work Center in Provincetown, Fellowship
- 1974: Grolier Prize in Poetry
- Ingram Merrill Foundation Fellowship

== Books ==
- 2017: In Darwin's Room. Penguin.
- 2012: By Herself. Penguin.
- 2008: Men, Women, and Ghosts. Penguin.
- 2004: Western Art. Penguin.
- 2001: God. Penguin.
- 1996: Desert Fathers, Uranium Daughters. Penguin.
- 1994: Off-Season at the Edge of the World. University of Illinois Press.
- 1990: The 1002nd Night. Princeton University Press.
- 1985: Blank Country (limited edition chapbook). Meadow Press.
- 1985: And. Princeton University Press.
- 1980: Cartography (limited edition chapbook). Penumbra Press.
- 1980: Movable Islands. Princeton University Press.
