= Angela Sorby =

American poet (born 1965)

Angela Sorby (born 1965) is an American poet, professor, and literary scholar.

== Biography ==
Angela Sorby was born in Seattle, Washington. In 2024 she teaches at Marquette University in Milwaukee, Wisconsin where her main teaching areas are American literature and creative writing and main academic interests are American poetry, popular culture, and children's literature. She is particularly interested in how poetry engages with children and childhood.

== Selected works ==
- Distance Learning (New Issues Press, 1998);
- Schoolroom Poets: Childhood, Performance, and the Place of American Poetry (University Press of New England, 2005)
- Bird Skin Coat (University of Wisconsin Press, 2009).
- Over the River and Through the Wood: An Anthology of Nineteenth-Century American Children's Poetry, co-edited with Karen Kilcup. Johns Hopkins University Press, 2013
- The Sleeve Waves (poems). Madison, WI: University of Wisconsin Press, 2014

== Literary awards ==
- Felix Pollak Prize (2014)
- John Fiske Poetry Prize, University of Chicago
- Midwest Book Award
- Brittingham Prize in Poetry
- Lorine Niedecker Award
- Fulbright fellowship
- Honor Book Prize from the Children's Literature Association (2005)
- Discovery/The Nation Prize
- Lorine Niedecker Prize
