= Cathleen Calbert =

American poet and writer

Cathleen Calbert is an American poet and writer, author of five poetry collections. Her writing has appeared in Ms. Magazine, The Nation, The New Republic, The New York Times, The Paris Review, Poetry, Ploughshares, and elsewhere. She was born in Jackson, Michigan and raised in southern California. She received her B.A. from the University of California at Berkeley, her M.A. from Syracuse University, and her Ph.D. from the University of Houston. Currently, she is a professor of English at Rhode Island College.

== Published works ==
Books

- The Afflicted Girls (Little Red Tree Publishing, 2016)
- Sleeping with a Famous Poet (C.W. Books, 2007)
- Bad Judgment (Sarabande Books, 1999)
- Lessons in Space (University Press of Florida, 1997)

Chapbooks

- The Ten Worst Human Fears (Rooster Hill Press, 2012)
- Death Poems (Premier Poets, 2005)
- My Summer as a Bride (Riverstone, 1995)

== Awards and honors ==
- "The Nation" Discovery Award
- Pushcart Prize
- Gordon Barber Memorial Award, Poetry Society of America
- Sheila Motton Book Award, New England Poetry Club

== Sources ==
- Amazon author page
- Cathleen Calbert's Web Page
- C.W. Books
- Sarabande Books
