= Andrew Hudgins =

American poet (born 1951)

Andrew Hudgins (born 22 April 1951) is an American poet.

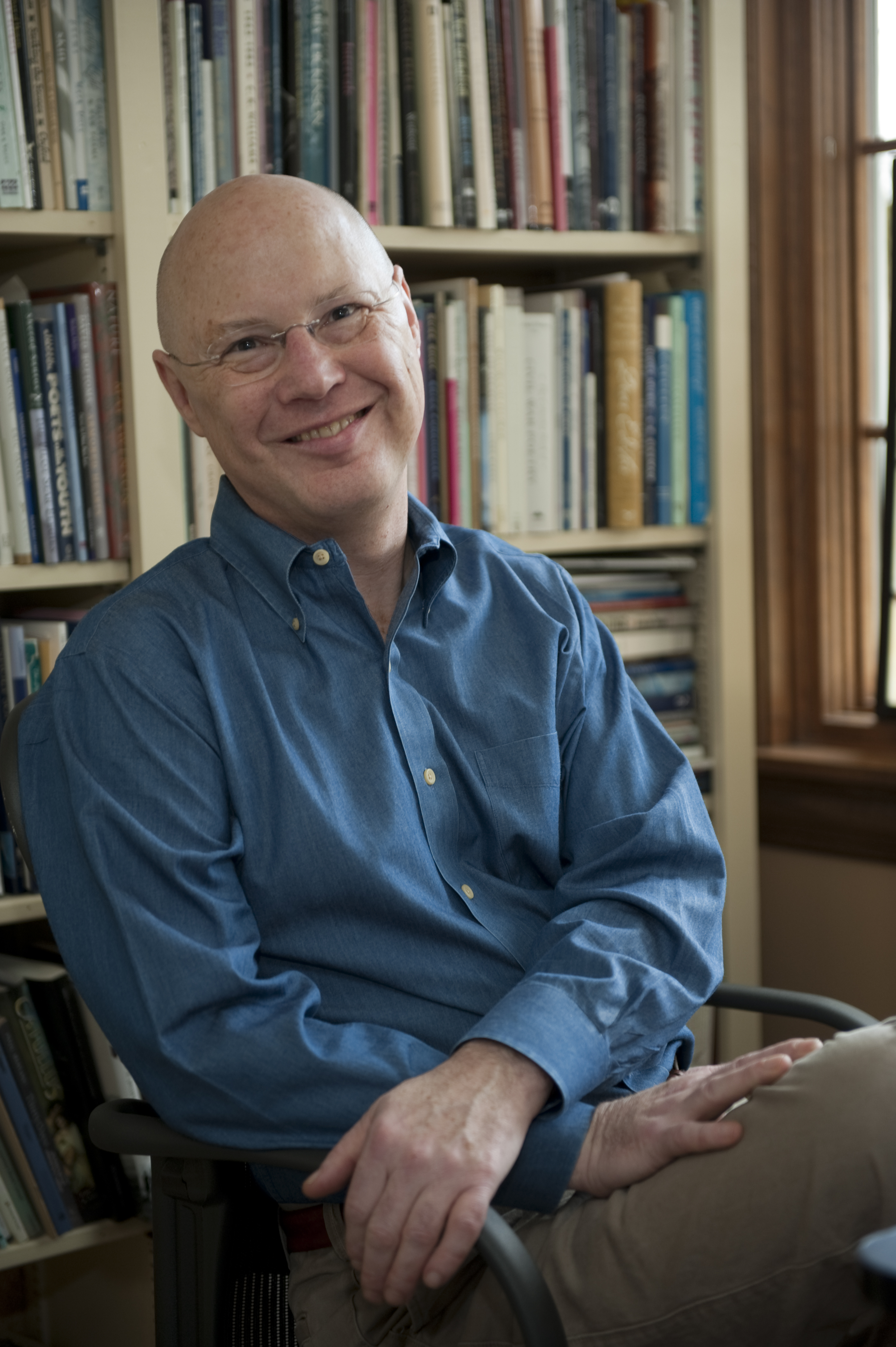
A portrait shot of Andrew Hudgins (poet)

== Biography ==
Hudgins was born in Killeen, Texas, and raised in Alabama. He earned a B.A. at Huntingdon College, an M.A. at the University of Alabama, and an M.F.A. at the University of Iowa. He is the author of numerous collections of poetry and essays, many of which have received high critical praise, such as The Never-Ending: New Poems (1991), which was a finalist for the National Book Awards; After the Lost War: A Narrative (1988, based on the life of Sidney Lanier), which received the Poets' Prize; and Saints and Strangers (1985), which was a finalist for the Pulitzer Prize. Hudgins is an elected member of the Fellowship of Southern Writers and a frequent Sewanee Writers' Conference faculty member. He is currently Humanities Distinguished Professor of English at Ohio State University. He previously taught at Baylor University and the University of Cincinnati. He is the recipient of a Guggenheim Fellowship and two NEA fellowships. Hudgins lives in Upper Arlington, Ohio, with his wife, the writer Erin McGraw.

== Bibliography ==
=== Poetry ===
Collections

- Saints and Strangers. Boston: Houghton Mifflin. 1985.
- After the Lost War: A Narrative. Houghton Mifflin Harcourt. 1988. ISBN 978-0-395-45713-9.
- The Never-Ending. Houghton Mifflin. 1991. ISBN 978-0-395-58570-2.
- The Glass Hammer: A Southern Childhood. Houghton Mifflin. 1994. ISBN 978-0-395-70011-2.
- Babylon in a Jar. Houghton Mifflin Harcourt. 1998. ISBN 978-0-618-12697-2.
- Ecstatic in the Poison. Overlook Press. 2003. ISBN 978-1-58567-429-9.
- Shut Up, You're Fine!: Poems for Very, Very Bad Children. Overlook Press. 2009. ISBN 978-1-59020-103-9.
- American Rendering: New and Selected Poems. Houghton Mifflin Harcourt. 2010. ISBN 978-0-547-48731-1.
- A Clown at Midnight. Mariner Books. 2013. ISBN 978-0-544-10880-6.

List of poems

Title	Year	First published	Reprinted/collected
Dragonfly	1997	"Dragonfly". The Atlantic Monthly. 280 (1): 82. July 1997.	

=== Nonfiction ===
- The glass anvil. University of Michigan Press. 1997.
- Diary of a Poem. University of Michigan Press. 2011. ISBN 978-0-472-07154-8.
- "Helen Keller answers the iron". The Kenyon Review. 33 (2). Spring 2011.
  - Reprinted in Henderson, Bill, ed. (2013). The Pushcart Prize XXXVII : best of the small presses 2013. Pushcart Press. pp. 452–468.
- The Joker: A Memoir. Simon & Schuster. 2013. ISBN 978-1-476-71271-0.
