= Jacqueline Osherow =

American poet

Jacqueline Osherow (born 1956) is an American poet, and Distinguished Professor at the University of Utah.

== Biography ==
Raised in Philadelphia, Jacqueline Osherow graduated from Radcliffe College with a BA magna cum laude, and from Princeton University with a PhD. At Harvard, she was part of the Harvard Lampoon. Her specialty is love poetry and Biblical poetry and she has been featured in Best American Poetry.

Writing in a 1999 article for the Poetry Society of America, Osherow said, “If I write out of a specific poetic tradition, it is the Jewish poetic tradition, American poet though I am.” Her work has appeared in The New Criterion, The Jewish Daily Forward, The Yale Review, and many other journals and quarterlies. Additionally, she has been anthologized in Twentieth Century American Poetry (2003), The Wadsworth Anthology of Poetry (2005), Jewish American Literature: A Norton Anthology (2000), and The Penguin Book of the Sonnet (2001), and has twice been included in Best American Poetry.

== Awards ==
- 1990 Witter Bynner Poetry Prize
- 1997 Guggenheim Fellowship
- 1999 National Endowment for the Arts Fellowship
- Ingram Merrill Foundation fellowship

== Works ==
=== Poetry collections ===
- Looking for Angels in New York, University of Georgia Press, 1988, ISBN 978-0-8203-1059-6
- Conversations with Survivors, University of Georgia Press, 1994, ISBN 978-0-8203-1612-3
- With a Moon in Transit. Grove Press. 1996. ISBN 978-0-8021-1599-7.
- Dead Men's Praise. Grove Press. 1999. ISBN 978-0-8021-3654-1.
- The Hoopoe's Crown. BOA Editions, Ltd. 2005. ISBN 978-1-929918-72-0.
- Whitethorn: Poems. LSU Press. 2011. ISBN 978-0-8071-3835-9.
- Ultimatum from Paradise: Poems. LSU Press. 2014. ISBN 978-0-8071-5806-7.
- My Lookalike at the Krishna Temple: Poems. LSU Press. 2019. ISBN 978-0-8071-6944-5.

=== Anthologies ===
- Jonathan N. Barron; Eric Murphy Selinger, eds. (2000). "Scattered Psalms XI". Jewish American poetry: poems, commentary, and reflections. UPNE. ISBN 978-1-58465-043-0.
- Jay Parini, ed. (2005). The Wadsworth anthology of poetry. Cengage Learning. ISBN 978-1-4130-0473-1.
- Charles Adés Fishman, ed. (2007). Blood to remember: American poets on the Holocaust. Time Being Books. ISBN 978-1-56809-112-9.

=== Non-fiction ===
- Sharon Bryan; William Olsen, eds. (2003). "Reading Poetry". Planet on the table: poets on the reading life. Sarabande Books. ISBN 978-1-889330-91-4.
- Peter S. Hawkins; Lesleigh Cushing Stahlberg, eds. (2006). "Honey and Milk Underneath Your Tongue". Scrolls of love: Ruth and the Song of songs. Fordham University Press. ISBN 978-0-8232-2572-9.
