= Glascock Prize =

Poetry prize awarded by Mount Holyoke College

The Glascock Poetry Prize is awarded to the winner of the annual Kathryn Irene Glascock Intercollegiate Poetry Contest at Mount Holyoke College. The "invitation-only competition is sponsored by the English department at Mount Holyoke and counts many well-known poets, including Sylvia Plath and James Merrill, among its past winners" and is thought to be the "oldest intercollegiate poetry competition."

== The contest ==
Each year, about six young poets from the nation's top colleges and universities are selected to participate. After being selected, participants submit a brief manuscript of poems, which they read at a public reading during the culmination of the contest.

== History ==
The annual Kathryn Irene Glascock Intercollegiate Poetry Contest is named after Kathryn Irene Glascock. Glascock was a young poet who graduated from Mount Holyoke in 1922.

Glascock died in 1923. Shortly after her death, Glascock's parents established the Glascock Prize. It became an intercollegiate event in 1924.

The Glascock Poetry Competition has launched the careers of many of America's most important poets including James Merrill who won in 1946 (and participated in 1938), Sylvia Plath who won in 1955, Kenneth Koch in 1948, Donald Hall who took second place in 1951 and Gjertrud Schnackenberg in 1973.

Other notable participants include Mark Halperin, Mary Jo Salter, Katha Pollitt, Mary Ann Radner, William Kunstler, James Agee and Frederick Buechner.

== Select judges ==
- George Abraham (poet)
- Samuel Ace
- Virginia Hamilton Adair
- Léonie Adams
- Kaveh Akbar
- Elizabeth Alexander
- A. R. Ammons
- Diannely Antigua
- Mary-Kim Arnold
- John Ashbery
- W. H. Auden
- Cameron Awkward-Rich
- Leonard Bacon
- Robert Bagg
- Mary Jo Bang
- Ari Banias
- C.L. Barber
- Phyllis Bartlett
- William Rose Benet
- April Bernard
- Mei-mei Berssenbrugge
- Martha Dickinson Bianchi
- Frank Bidart
- Elizabeth Bishop
- W.W. Bison
- Louise Bogan
- Marie Borroff
- Annie Boutelle
- Gerald Warner Brace
- Mrs. Marshall Bragdon
- Anna Hempstead Branch
- John Malcolm Brinnin
- Howard Buck
- Stephanie Burt
- Witter Bynner
- Henry Seidel Canby
- Helen Chasin
- Marilyn Chin
- Franny Choi
- John Ciardi
- Amy Clampitt
- Sarah Norcliffe Cleghorn
- Billy Collins
- Grace Conkling
- Jane Cooper
- Alfred Corn
- Sidney E. Cox
- Douglas Crase
- Robert Gorham Davis
- Fannie Stearns Davis
- Erica Dawson
- Sara de Ford
- Oliver de la Paz
- Thomas Del Vecchio
- Babette Deutsch
- Mark Doty
- Alan Dugan
- Richard Eberhart
- Martín Espada
- Rhina Espaillat
- David Ferry
- Arthur Davison Ficke
- Rosamund Field
- Donald Finkel
- Dudley Fitts
- Robert Fitzgerald
- Wallace Fowlie
- Robert Francis
- Kimon Friar
- Robert Frost
- Elizabeth Hollister Frost
- Kay Gabriel
- Sarah Gambito
- George Garrett
- Dana Gioia
- Rolland Greenwood
- Eamon Grennan
- Susan Griffin
- Emily Grosholz
- Marilyn Hacker
- Pamela White Hadas
- Rachel Hadas
- Donald Hall
- William Haller
- Michael S. Harper
- Jeffrey Harrison
- Matthea Harvey
- Seamus Heaney
- Anthony Hecht
- Daniel Hoffman
- John Hollander
- Margaret Holley
- John Holmes
- Anna Maria Hong
- Richard Howard
- Barbara Howes
- Andrew Hudgins
- Rolfe Humphries
- Erica Hunt
- Josephine Jacobsen
- Donald Justice
- Kirun Kapur
- Donika Kelly
- X. J. Kennedy
- Myung Mi Kim
- Galway Kinnell
- Karl Kirchwey
- Carolyn Kizer
- Kenneth Koch
- Stanley Koehler
- John Koethe
- Maxine Kumin
- Stanley Kunitz
- Joseph Langland
- Joseph O. Legaspi
- David Lehman
- Denise Levertov
- Sarah Lindsay
- Audre Lorde
- John Livingston Lowes
- Jay Macpherson
- Dora Malech
- Dawn Lundy Martin
- Cleopatra Mathis
- Glyn Maxwell
- Nathan McClain
- J. D. McClatchy
- Joshua Mehigan
- William Morris Meredith Jr.
- James Merrill
- Edwin Valentine Mitchell
- Marianne Moore
- Stearns Morse
- David Morton
- Fred Moten
- Edwin Muir
- Paul Muldoon
- Eileen Myles
- Marilyn Nelson
- Howard Nemerov
- Hoa Nguyen
- Diana O'Hehir
- Miller Wolf Oberman
- Ed Ochester
- Alicia Ostriker
- Curtis Hidden Page
- Linda Pastan
- Molly Peacock
- John Peck
- Joyce Peseroff
- Kiki Petrosino
- Carl Phillips
- Robert Pinsky
- Sylvia Plath
- Katha Pollitt
- Wyatt Printy
- John Crowe Ransom
- Jessie Rehder
- Alastair Reid
- Margaret Rhee
- Adrienne Rich
- Jessie Rittenhouse
- Florence Dunbar Robertson
- Stephen Romer
- Mary Jo Salter
- Tony Sanders
- May Sarton
- Gjertrud Schnackenberg
- Grace Schulman
- James Scully
- Winnifred Wlles Shearer
- Evie Shockley
- Jane Shore
- Charles Simic
- L. E. Sissman
- Hallet D. Smith
- Susan Snively
- W. D. Snodgrass
- Charles Wilbert Snow
- Barry Spacks
- Stephen Spender
- Elizabeth Spires
- Kathleen Spivack
- Jane Springer
- George Starbuck
- Leonard, Stevens
- Mark Strand
- Roberta Teale Swartz
- John L. Sweeney
- Larissa Szporluk
- Genevieve Taggard
- Jennif(f)er Tamayo
- Ridgely Torrence
- John Updike
- Jean Valentine
- Lyrae van Clief-Stefanon
- Mona Van Duyn
- Peter Viereck
- Ellen Bryant Voigt
- Diane Wakoski
- Derek Walcott
- Andrews Wanning
- Rosanna Warren
- Deborah Warren
- Theodore Weiss
- Rachel Wetzsteon
- George F. Whicher
- Ruth Whitman
- Richard Wilbur
- Nancy Willard
- William Carlos Williams
- Greg Williamson
- Ronaldo V. Wilson
- Terri Witek
- Baron Wormser
- James Wright
- John Yau
- Cynthia Zarin

== Preludes ==
In 1973, in honor of the 50th anniversary of the contest, the English department of Mount Holyoke College published a collection of poems titled Preludes: Selected Poems from the Kathryn Irene Glascock Intercollegiate Poetry Contest 1924-1973.

The collection included selected works from the first 50 years of the competition such as "The Black Swan" by James Merrill.
