= Cavankerry Press =

American nonprofit literary press

- Founded: 2000
- Founder: Joan Cusack Handler and Florenz Eisman
- Country of origin: United States
- Headquarters location: Fort Lee, New Jersey
- Distribution: University of Chicago Press
- Publication types: Books
- Fiction genres: Poetry, nonfiction
- Official website: www.cavankerrypress.org

CavanKerry Press is an American nonprofit literary press located in Fort Lee, New Jersey, which publishes poetry and nonfiction. CavanKerry Press is a member of the Community of Literary Magazines and Presses, has thrice received a Citation of Excellence from the New Jersey Arts Council honoring New Jersey arts organizations, and was a finalist for the 2017 AWP Small Press Publisher Award.

Some notable authors published by CavanKerry Press include Ross Gay, Mary Ruefle, Robert Cording, January Gill O'Neil, Maureen Seaton, Joseph O. Legaspi, Baron Wormser, Jeanne Marie Beaumont, Christopher Bursk, and Paola Corso. CavanKerry Press titles have been reviewed in Publishers Weekly, Women’s Review of Books, Mom Egg Review, The Rumpus, Cutbank, and other publications; the press has also been featured in articles in The New York Times and Poets & Writers.

The press publishes five to six books a year by emerging, mid-career and established poets, memoirs with the theme "Lives Brought to Life," and collections of poetry and prose exploring "serious physical and/or psychological illness," and seeks manuscripts “from the broadest range of writers, including people of color and people with disabilities.” The press is run by founding publisher, senior editor, and clinical psychologist, Joan Cusack Handler, who is also the author of three poetry collections. CavanKerry Press titles are distributed by University of Chicago Press. The press has received support from New Jersey State Council on the Arts, the Gold Foundation, and other organizations.

== Sources ==
- CavanKerry Press Website, Various Pages
- Poets & Writers | Small Presses
- Amazon Books | Advanced Search | Cavankerry Press | Featured Titles
