= Hilary Tham =

American poet

Hilary Tham (August 20, 1946 – June 24, 2005), also known as Hilary Tham Goldberg, was a Malaysian-born American poet. Tham studied English literature in Malaysia before marrying an American Peace Corps worker. She then converted to Judaism and immigrated to the U.S. Tham published many books of poetry and was editor-in-chief for the nonprofit poetry publishing house, Word Works.

== Biography ==
The daughter of Chinese immigrants, Hilary Tham was born in Klang, Malaysia. She attended a convent school run by Irish nuns, a Catholic school run by Dominican friars, and a prep school in Kuala Lumpur. She received her bachelor's degree in English literature from the University of Malaya in 1969. She converted to Judaism after marrying Jewish-American Peace Corps worker, Joseph Goldberg, in Malaysia. In 1971, the couple immigrated to the United States, first settling in New Jersey and then moving to Arlington, Virginia two years later. She chaired the Northern Virginia Coalition, a nonprofit organization that helped to resettle Vietnamese refugees, and served as sisterhood president at her synagogue, which is now the Congregation Etz Hayim in Arlington. Tham was editor-in-chief for Word Works, a nonprofit poetry publishing house, and was poetry editor for the Potomac Review. She taught creative writing at various nearby schools, including Yorktown High School and Williamsburg Middle School, and was an Oriental brush painter. She died in Arlington at the age of 58 from metastatic lung cancer.

Tham reflected upon both Asian and American culture in her work. She has been categorized as a "Chinese-Malaysian writer with Judaic influences." Two of her books have appeared in the curriculum of the University of Pittsburgh.

== Legacy ==
In 2005, Word Works renamed their Capital Collection the Hilary Tham Capital Collection in her honor.

== Awards and honors ==
Tham's collection of poems, Bad Names for Women, won second prize in the 1988 Virginia Poetry Prizes and the 1990 Paterson Poetry Prize. Tin Mines and Concubines received the Washington Writers Publishing House Prize.

== Selected works ==
=== Poetry ===
Sources:

- No Gods Today. 1969.
- Paper Boats: Poems. 1987. ISBN 9780894105418.
- Bad Names for Women. 1989. ISBN 0-915380-23-4.
- Tigerbone Wine (Poems). 1992. ISBN 0894107275.
- Men & Other Strange Myths: Poems and Art. 1994. ISBN 0-89410-775-5.
- Counting: A Long Poem. 2000. ISBN 0-915380-45-5.
- Reality Check & Other Travel Poems & Art. 2001. ISBN 1888832177.
- The Tao of Mrs. Wei. 2003. ISBN 978-0-938572-37-4.

=== Memoir ===
- Lane With No Name: Memoirs and Poems of a Malaysian-Chinese Girlhood. 1997. ISBN 089410831X.

=== Short story ===
- Tin Mines and Concubines. 2005. ISBN 0931846765.
