= Frannie Lindsay =

American poet

Frannie Lindsay is an American poet. She is author of three poetry collections, most recently, The Snow's Wife (Cavankerry Press, 2020). Her honors include fellowships from the National Endowment for the Arts, the Massachusetts Cultural Council, the MacDowell and Millay Colonies, and Yaddo. Her poems have been published in literary journals and magazines including The Atlantic Monthly, The Yale Review, Black Warrior Review, The Georgia Review, The Southern Review, Southern Humanities Review, Field, Prairie Schooner, Poetry East, Beloit Poetry Journal, Harvard Review, and Hunger Mountain. Her poems have also been featured on Poetry Daily, and Verse Daily. Lindsay earned her B.A. from Russell Sage College and her M.F.A. from the Iowa Writers’ Workshop. She grew up in a musical family—her mother was a concert violinist—and she is a classical pianist and lives in Belmont, Massachusetts with her two dogs.

== Published works ==
Full-Length Poetry Collections

- The Snow's Wife (Cavankerry Press, 2020)
- If Mercy (Word Works, 2016)
- Our Vanishing (Red Hen Press, 2014)
- Mayweed (Word Works, 2010)
- Lamb (Perugia Press, 2006)
- Where She Always Was (Utah State University Press, 2004)

== Honors and awards ==
- 2009 Washington Prize
- 2006 Massachusetts Cultural Council Artist Fellowship
- 2006 Perugia Press Prize
- 2004 May Swenson Poetry Award
