= Kathryn Irene Glascock =

American poet

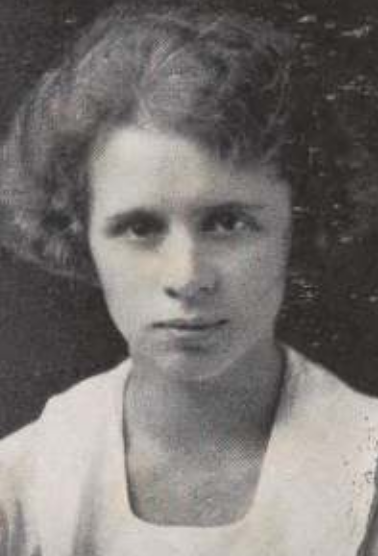
- Kathryn Irene Glascock, 1922 Mount Holyoke College yearbook
- Born: 1901
- Died: February 23, 1923 (aged 21–22)
- Occupation: Poet

Kathryn Irene Glascock (1901 – February 23, 1923) was an American poet. The Kathryn Irene Glascock Intercollegiate Poetry Contest is named after her.

== Early life and education ==
Glascock was born in 1901 to parents Hugh Grundy Glascock, an educator, and Etta (or Ella) Bodine Woods. She was raised in Culver, Indiana. Glascock graduated from Mount Holyoke College in 1922.

At Mount Holyoke, she was editor of the school newspaper, and was elected to Phi Beta Kappa. Glascock worked as a magazine editor in New York after college.

== Legacy ==
In her memory, her parents established the annual Kathryn Irene Glascock Intercollegiate Poetry Contest at Mount Holyoke College in 1923. The contest became an intercollegiate event in 1924. In addition, Glascock's parents also published a collection of her poetry entitled, Poems, and had one of her poems, "Daylight," published in Poetry Magazine.

She died there in 1923, from pneumonia.

== Poetry ==
- Poems. Garden City, N.Y. : Country Life Press, 1923.
- "Daylight," Poetry Magazine, Volume 22, May 1923, Page 83.
