= Fred Marchant =

American poet

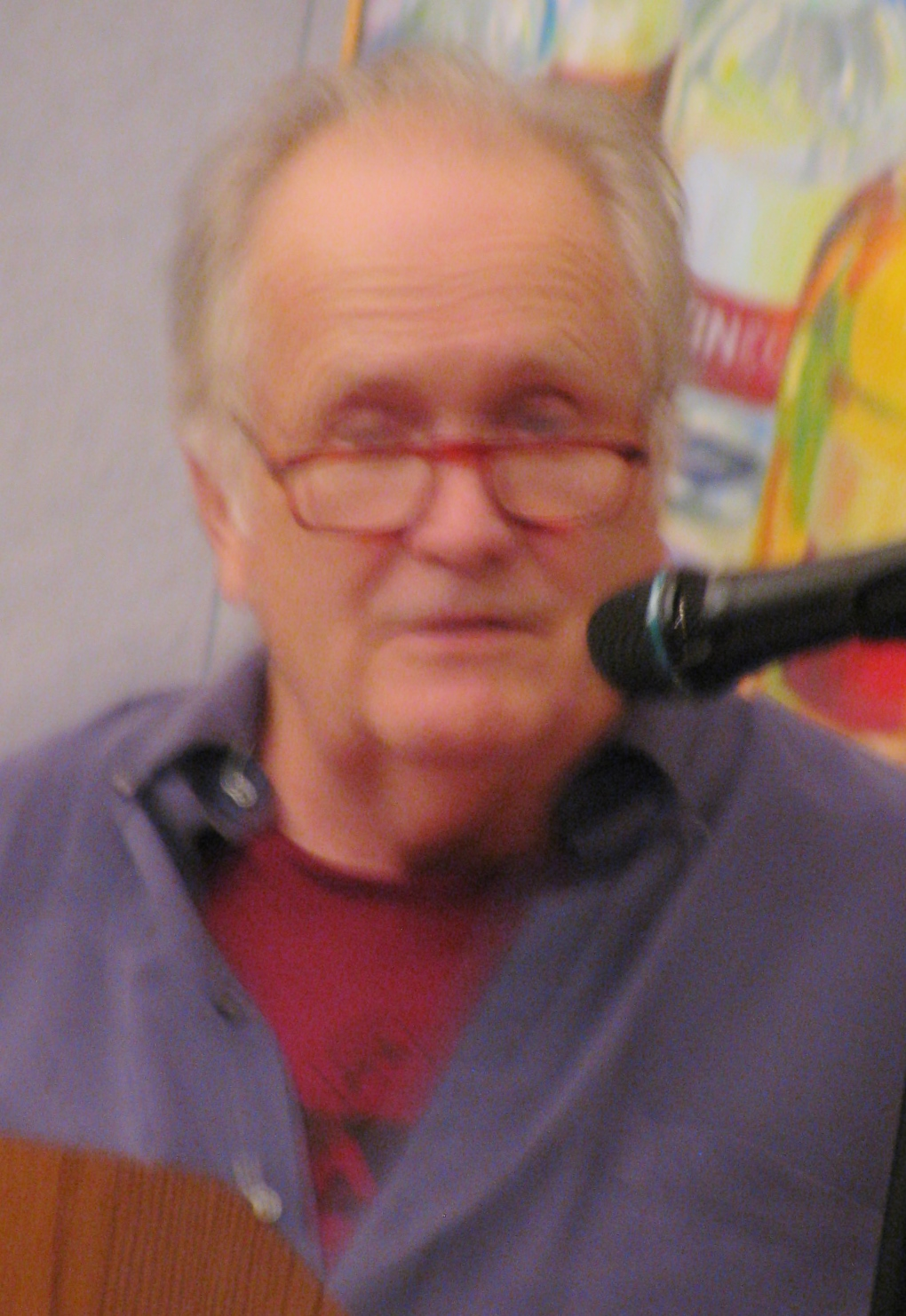
- Education: Brown University; University of Chicago
- Writing career
- Genre: Poetry

Fred Marchant is an American poet, and Professor of English and Literature at Suffolk University. He is the director of both the Creative Writing program and The Poetry Center at Suffolk University.

== Life ==
In 1970, he became one of the first officers of the US Marine Corps to be honorably discharged as a conscientious objectors in the Vietnam War.

He is the author of four books of poetry, of which Tipping Point was the winner of the 1993 Washington Prize in poetry. He is a graduate of Brown University, and earned a PhD from The University of Chicago's Committee on Social Thought.

He lives in Arlington, MA.

== Published works ==
Full-length poetry collections

- Tipping Point The Word Works, 1993, ISBN 9780915380305; 2013, ISBN 9780915380862
- Full Moon Boat Graywolf Press, 2000, ISBN 9781555973117
- House on Water, House in Air 2002, ISBN 9781901233872
- The Looking House Graywolf Press, 2009, ISBN 9781555975289
