= Joaquin Miller =

American poet and frontiersman (1837–1913)

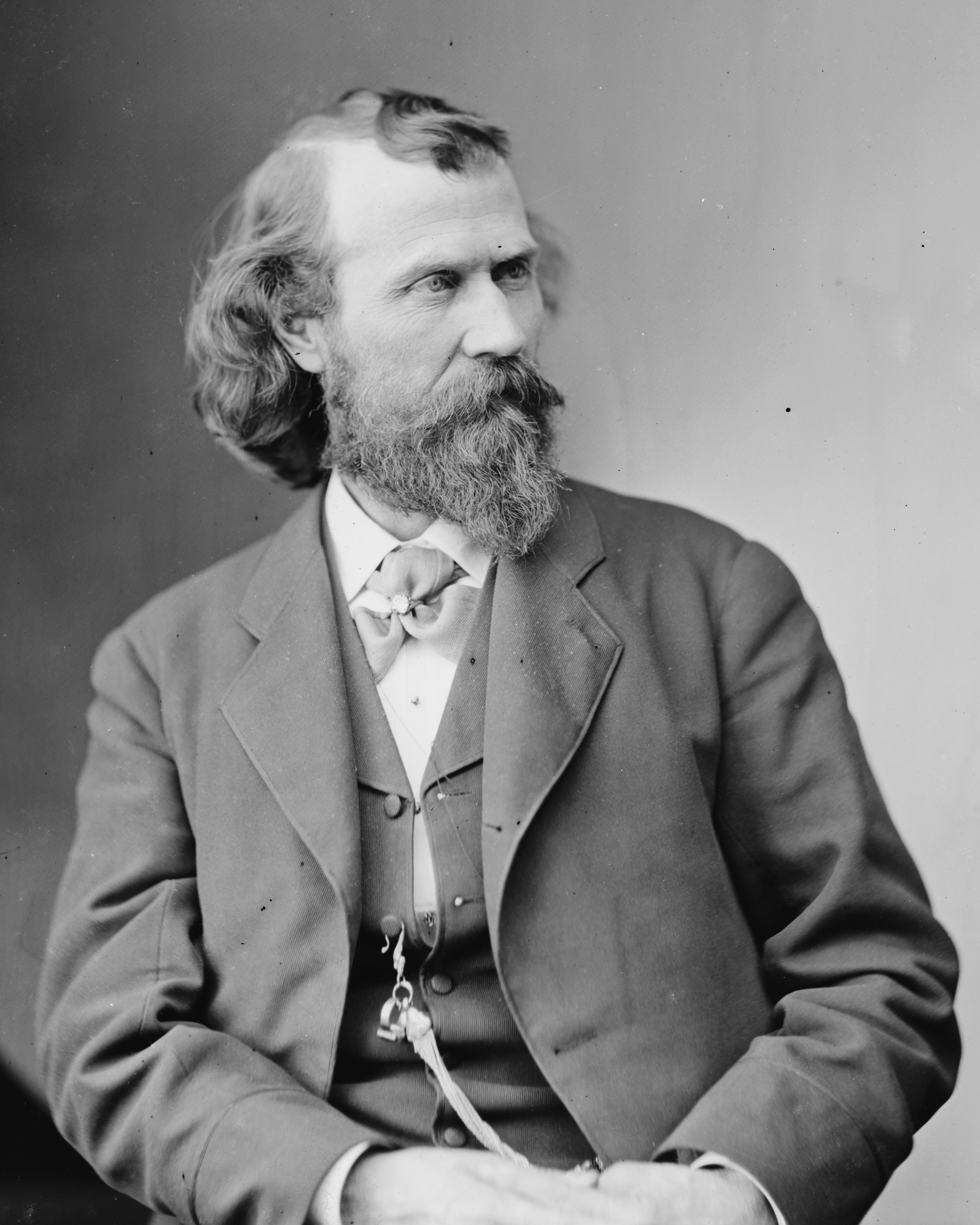
- Photo of Joaquin Miller, 1870–1880
- Born: Cincinnatus Hiner Miller; September 8, 1837; Union County, Indiana, U.S.
- Died: February 17, 1913 (aged 75); Oakland, California, U.S.
- Resting place: Joaquin Miller Park
- Occupations: Poet, author, frontiersman
- Spouse(s): Minnie Myrtle Miller (m. 1861; div. 1870) Abigail Leland (m. 1879; died 1913)
- Children: 4 or 5

Signature
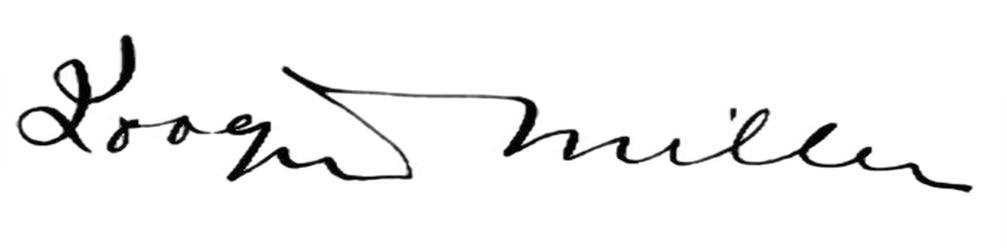

Cincinnatus Heine Miller (Note: His middle name is also spelled Hiner (/ˈhaɪnər/ HY-nər).) (/ˌsɪnsɪˈneɪtəs ˈhaɪnə/ SIN-sin-AY-təs HY-nə; September 8, 1837 – February 17, 1913), better known by his pen name Joaquin Miller (/hwɑːˈkiːn/ whah-KEEN), was an American poet, author, and frontiersman. He became known as the "Poet of the Sierras" after the Sierra Nevada, about which he wrote in his Songs of the Sierras (1871).

== Life ==
=== Early years and family ===
Joaquin Miller's parents were Hulings Miller and Margaret (née Witt), who married January 3, 1836, in Union County, Indiana. Their second son, Cincinnatus Hiner Miller, was born in 1837 near Liberty, Indiana. Miller later claimed his birth date was November 10, 1841, and that he was born in Millersville, Indiana, a town he claimed was founded by his father, while on a wagon heading west. As he wrote, "My cradle was a covered wagon, pointed west". After leaving Union County, Miller's father moved the family to Grant County, Indiana to a location near the Mississinewa River and near the Miami Indian Reservation. Between 1850 and 1852, his family followed the Oregon Trail to settle in the Willamette Valley, establishing a farm in what would become Lane County.

Well educated by his school teacher father, Miller was an avid reader. Besides later adopting the pen name "Joaquin", he would also change his middle name from Hiner to Heine to evoke the German poet Heinrich Heine.

As a young man, he moved to northern California during the California Gold Rush years, and had a variety of adventures, including spending a year living in a Native American village, and being wounded in a battle with Native Americans. A number of his popular works, Life Amongst the Modocs, An Elk Hunt, and The Battle of Castle Crags, draw on these experiences. He was wounded in the cheek and neck with an arrow during this latter battle, recuperating at the Gold Rush-era mining town of Portuguese Flat.

=== Wanderings and early writings ===
He accompanied William Walker on the latter's 1855 filibustering expedition to Nicaragua. In the spring of 1857, Miller took part in an expedition against the Pit River Tribe after they killed a white man on Pit River. Years later, he claimed that he had sided with the Native Americans and was run out of town for it. He was widely rumored to have married an Indian woman, possibly a Wintu woman who nursed him back to health after he was wounded by Modocs, and to have fathered with her a daughter named Cali-Shasta, or "Lily of the Shasta." Although Miller soon left the area to pursue other adventures, in the 1870s he sought out Cali-Shasta, then in her teens, and took her to San Francisco to be educated by his friend Ina Coolbrith. Contemporaries believed that Miller's "Indian wife" was the woman later kidnapped by Modocs and held in captivity for some years until rescued by a man named Jim Brock (whom she married), but when "Amanda Brock" died in 1909, Miller denied news reports describing his supposed romance with her. He credited her with saving his life, but said she had always been a platonic friend.

Spending a short time in the mining camps of northern Idaho, Miller found his way to Canyon City, Oregon by 1864, where he was elected the third Judge of Grant County. His old cabin in Canyon City is still standing.

Miller's exploits included a variety of occupations: mining-camp cook (who came down with scurvy from only eating what he cooked), lawyer and a judge, newspaper writer, Pony Express rider, and horse thief. On July 10, 1859, Miller was caught stealing a gelding valued at $80, a saddle worth $15, and other items. He was jailed briefly in Shasta County for the crime, and various accounts give other incidents of his repeating this crime in California and Oregon.

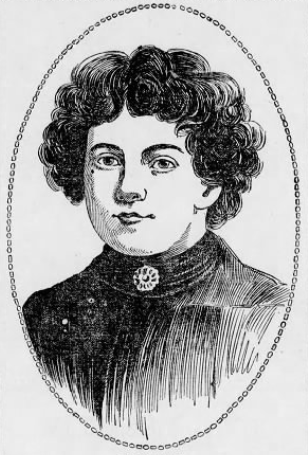
Maud Miller, one of his daughters

Miller earned an estimated $3,000 working as a Pony Express rider and used the money to move to Oregon. With the help of his friend, Senator Joseph Lane, he became editor of the Democratic Register in Eugene, a role he held from March 15 to September 20, 1862. Though no copies survive, it was known as sympathetic to the Confederacy until it was forced to shut down because of its treasonable character. That year, Miller married Theresa Dyer on September 12, 1862, in her home four days after meeting her in Port Orford, Oregon. He had corresponded with her after exchanging poems with her for critique and chasing away a competing suitor. She published poetry under the pen name "Minnie Myrtle" and later, as Minnie Myrtle Miller. The couple had three children: Maud, George, and Henry, although Miller would later claim the baby Henry was not his own.

In 1868, Miller paid for the publication of 500 copies of his first book of poetry, Specimens. It was unnoticed, and Miller gave away more copies than he sold. Few have survived. The author's despair and disappointment were reflected in his second book, Joaquin et al., the next year.

Dyer filed for divorce on April 4, 1870, claiming they had a third child, Henry Mark, the year before, and that Miller was "wholly" neglectful. The court declared them divorced on April 19, and Dyer was granted custody of the baby while the two older children were left in the care of her mother. Miller was ordered to pay $200 per year in child support. Miller believed the divorce prevented him from being nominated for a seat on the Oregon Supreme Court. He never denied her charges that he was neglectful of her and their children and was rarely home. He also may have had an affair with actress Adah Isaacs Menken shortly into the marriage.

=== Travels ===
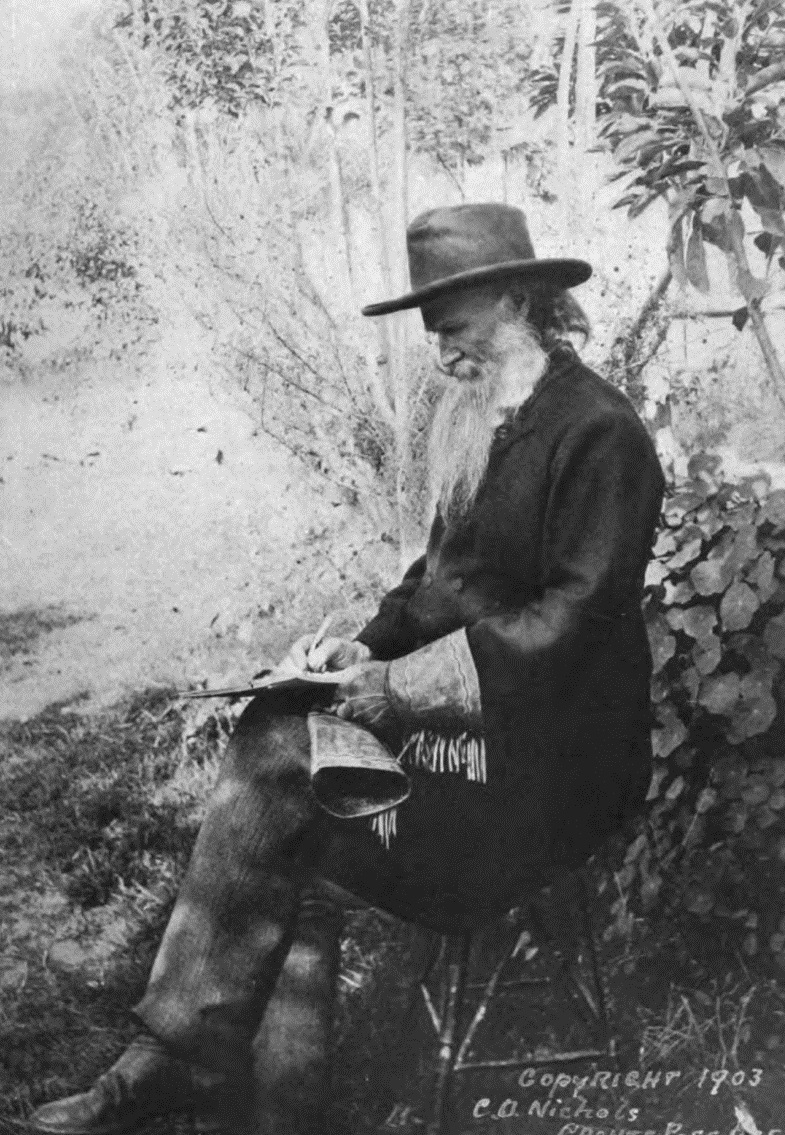
Joaquin Miller, 1903

Miller had sent a copy of Joaquin, et al. to Bret Harte, who offered advice that he avoid "faults of excess" and encouragingly wrote, "you are on your way to become a poet." The next summer, July 1870, Miller traveled to San Francisco with borrowed money and there befriended Charles Warren Stoddard and Ina Coolbrith. Stoddard was the first to meet him at the dock and, as he recalled, Miller's first words to him were, "Well, let us go and talk with the poets."

Miller went to England, where he was celebrated as a frontier oddity. There, in May 1871, Miller published Songs of the Sierras, the book which finalized his nickname as the "Poet of the Sierras". It was well received by the British press and members of the Pre-Raphaelite Brotherhood, particularly Dante Gabriel Rossetti and William Michael Rossetti. He was briefly engaged to Iza Duffus Hardy in 1873.

While in England, Miller was one of the few Americans invited into the Savage Club along with Julian Hawthorne, son of Nathaniel Hawthorne. The younger Hawthorne referred to Miller as "a licensed libertine" but admitted to finding him "charming, amiable, and harmless". Miller returned to England several times after visiting family on both coasts of the U.S. He eventually stayed in New York.

In 1877, Miller adapted his First Fam'lies of the Sierras into a play, The Danites, or, the Heart of the Sierras. It opened on August 22 in New York with McKee Rankin as the main character. The anti-Mormon play, which featured Danites hunting the daughter of one of the murderers of Joseph Smith, became one of the most commercially successful in a series of anti-Mormon dramas at the time. The Spirit of the Times, however, attributed its success to curious audience members expecting a disastrous failure and instead discovering a good show: "The play proved to possess more than ordinary merit, and if it is not a great work, it is decidedly not a very bad one." The Danites was extended from a run of only a few days to one of seven straight weeks before moving to another theatre and, ultimately, was performed to such a degree that it rivaled the popularity of Uncle Tom's Cabin. It was published in book form later in 1877. Miller later admitted that he regretted the anti-Mormon tone.

Miller married for a third time on September 8, 1879 to Abigail Leland, in New York City. They later moved to Washington, D.C. before he returned to California in 1889. Over the next few decades, he traveled to Montana, China, and the Klondike, reporting for newspapers.

=== Later years and death ===
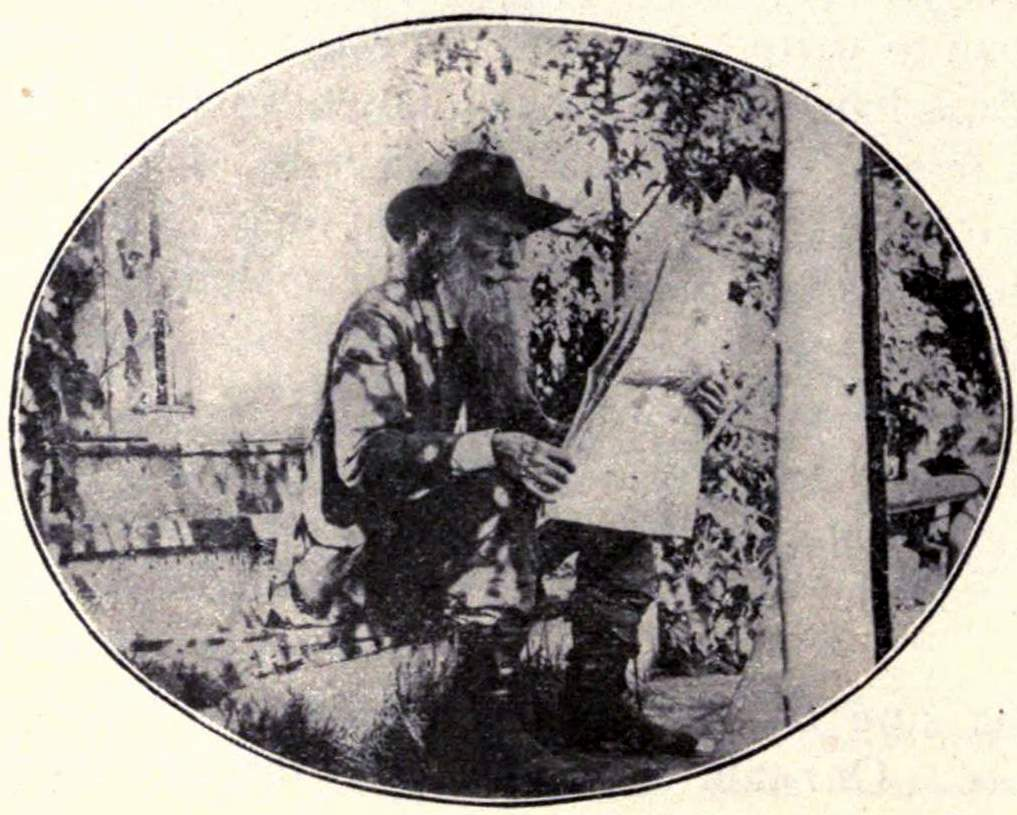
Miller c. 1905

In 1886, Miller published The Destruction of Gotham, a book which was one of the earliest to depict a prostitute as a heroine. That year, he moved to Oakland, California, and built a home for himself he nicknamed "The Abbey" on property he called "The Hights" [sic]. He remained there until his death in 1913.

Japanese poet Yone Noguchi came to The Hights in 1894 and spent the next four years there as an unpaid laborer in exchange for room and board. While living there, he published his first book, Seen or Unseen; or, Monologues of a Homeless Snail (1897). Though he referred to Miller as "the most natural man", Noguchi reflected on those years as his most difficult in the United States and later fictionalized his experience in The American Diary of a Japanese Girl.

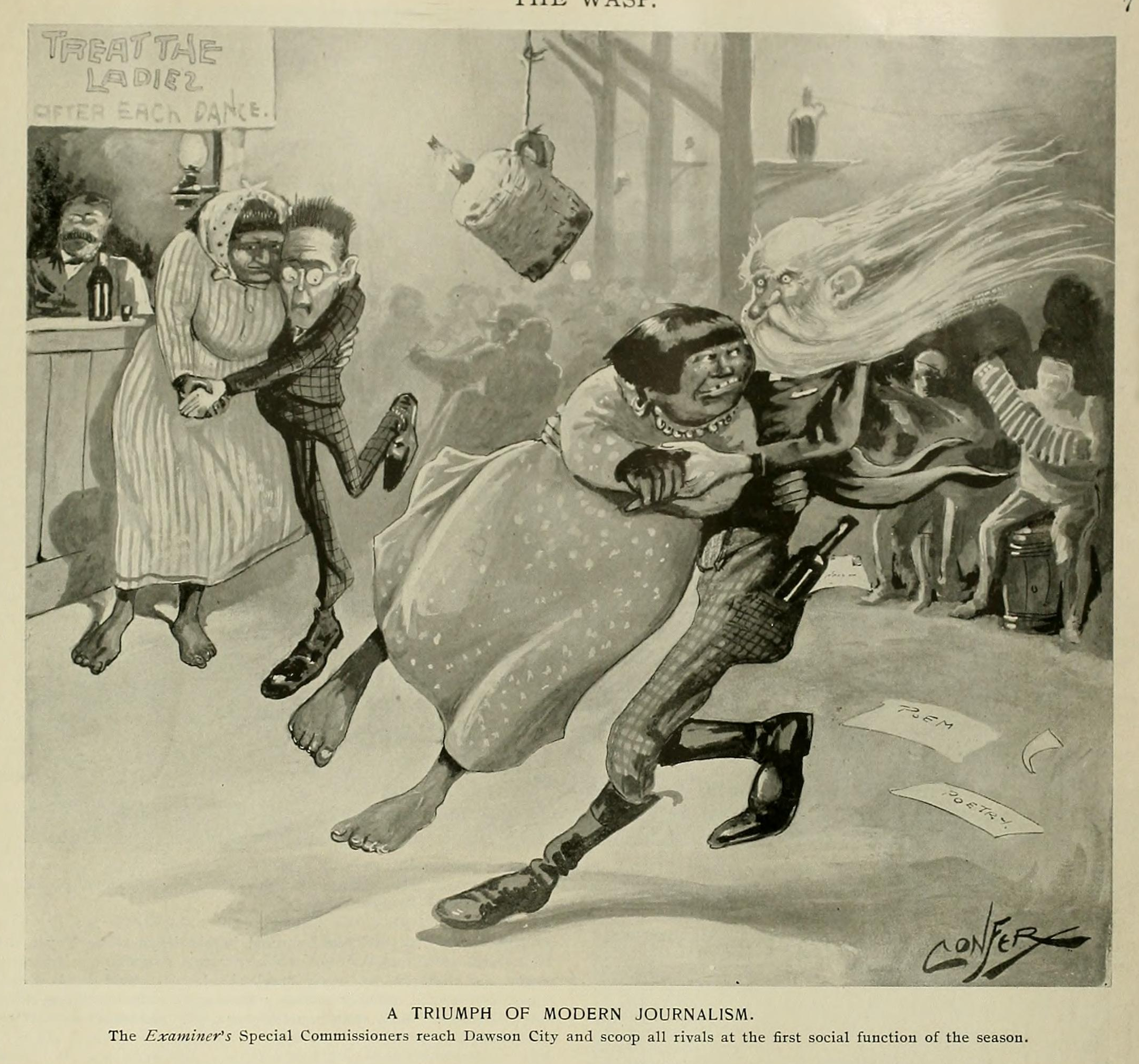
"A Triumph Of Modern Journalism", a cartoon by C. H. Confer published in The Wasp mocking Miller and Edward J. Livernash's Klondike expedition, September 25, 1897

Miller traveled to the Yukon alongside future congressman Edward J. Livernash as a newspaper correspondent in 1897. He saw Alaska for the first time on July 30. His dispatches, many of which were written before reaching Alaska, incorrectly implied an easy and inexpensive trip. Miller himself nearly froze to death; two toes were lost to frostbite.

In the wake of the Pacification of Samar, Miller "dedicated" a poem to General Jacob H. Smith titled "That Assassin of Samar" which denounced him for his orders to kill everyone on the island of Samar over the age of ten.

Miller died on February 17, 1913, surrounded by friends and family. His last words were recorded as "Take me away; take me away!" The poet had asked to be cremated by friends in the funeral pyre he built at The Hights with no religious ceremony and without being embalmed. His wishes were mostly ignored, and the funeral on February 19 drew thousands of curious onlookers. The preacher who spoke referred to Miller as "the last of America's great poets." On May 23, members of the Bohemian Club of San Francisco and the Press Club returned to Miller's funeral pyre to burn the urn which contained his ashes, allowing them to scatter. He had left no will and his estate – estimated at $100,000 – was divided between his wife, Abigail, and daughter, Juanita.

== Critical response and reputation ==
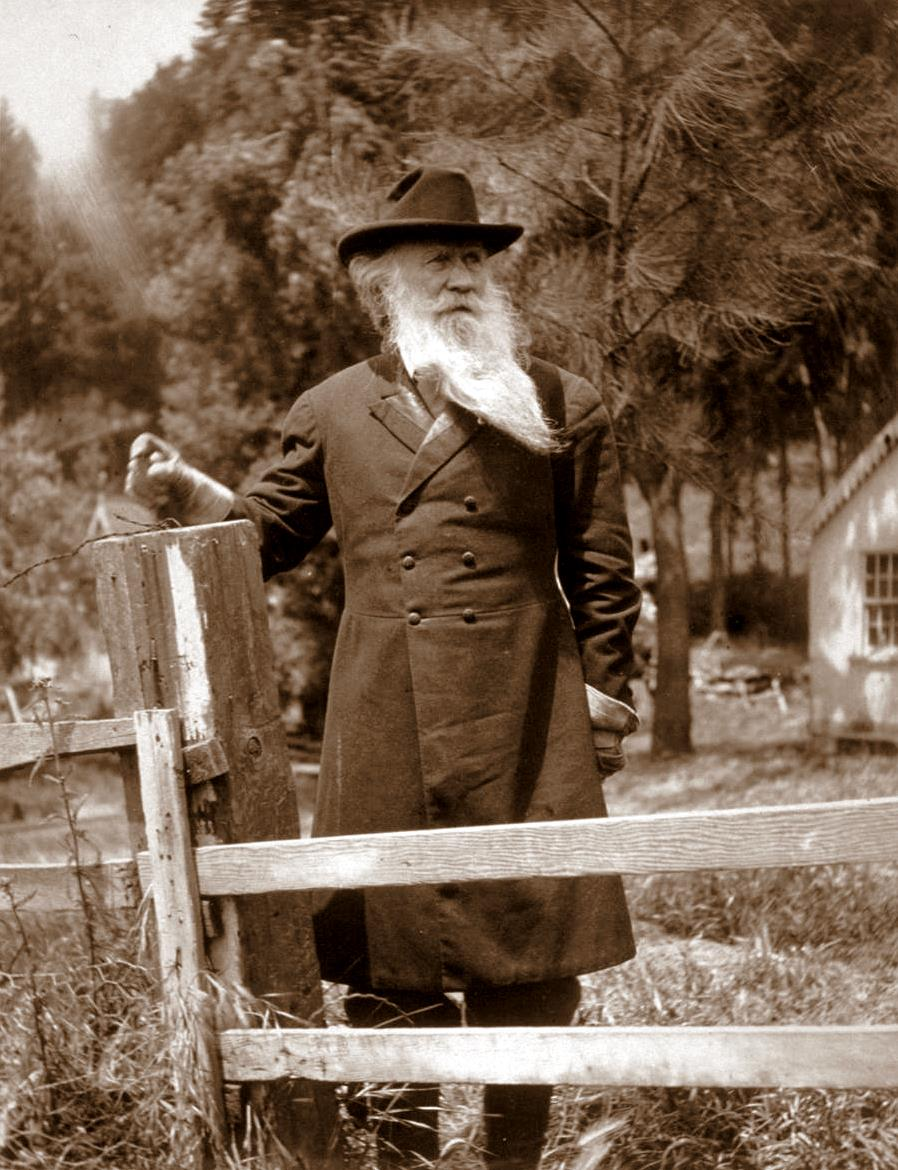
Miller in later years

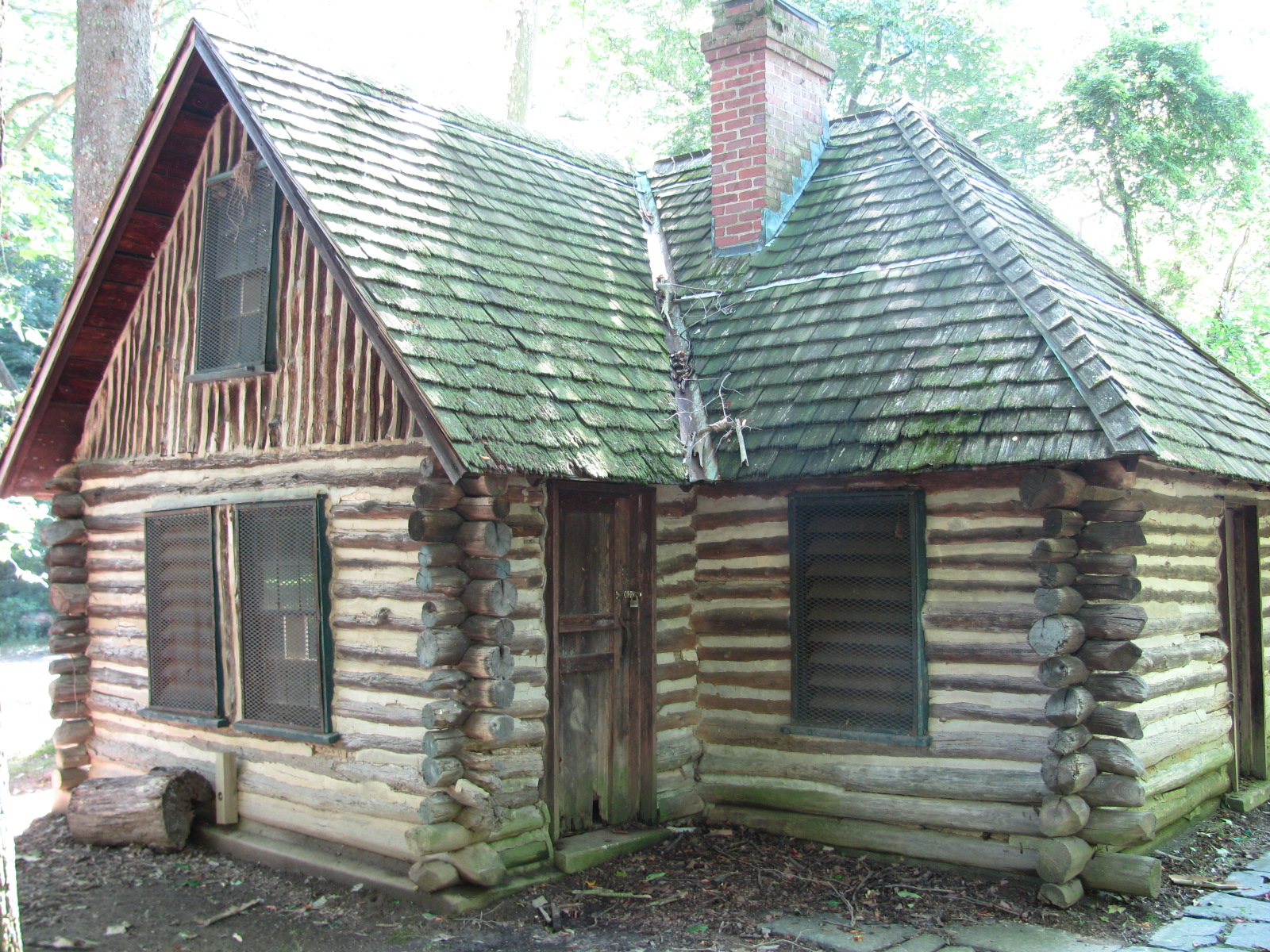
Joaquin Miller Cabin in Washington, D.C.'s Rock Creek Park

Miller was championed, although not enthusiastically, by Bret Harte and Ambrose Bierce. In his time, Miller was known for his dishonesty and womanizing. Bierce, his friend and contemporary, said of him, "In impugning Mr. Miller's veracity, or rather, in plainly declaring that he has none, I should be sorry to be understood as attributing a graver moral delinquency than he really has. He cannot, or will not, tell the truth, but he never tells a malicious or thrifty falsehood." Miller's response was, "I always wondered why God made Bierce."

Called the "Poet of the Sierras" and the "Byron of the Rockies", he may have been more of a celebrity in England than in his native U.S. Much of his reputation, however, came not from his poetry but from the image he created for himself by capitalizing on the stereotypical image of Western frontiersmen. As poet Bayard Taylor bitterly noted in 1876, British audiences "place the simulated savagery of Joaquin Miller beside the pure and serene muse of Longfellow." Critics made much of Miller's poor spelling and rhymes; he once rhymed "Goethe" and "teeth". Henry Cuyler Bunner satirized the error in a poem titled "Shake, Mulleary, and Go-ethe". Miller himself once admitted, "I'm damned if I could tell the difference between a hexameter and a pentameter to save my scalp."

The Westminster Review referred to Miller's poetry as "Whitman without the coarseness". For a time, Miller's poem "Columbus" was one of the most widely known American poems, memorized and recited by legions of schoolchildren. Miller is remembered today, among other reasons, for lines from his poem in honor of "Burns and Byron":

In men whom men condemn as ill
I find so much of goodness still.
In men whom men pronounce divine
I find so much of sin and blot
I do not dare to draw a line
Between the two, where God has not.

== Legacy ==
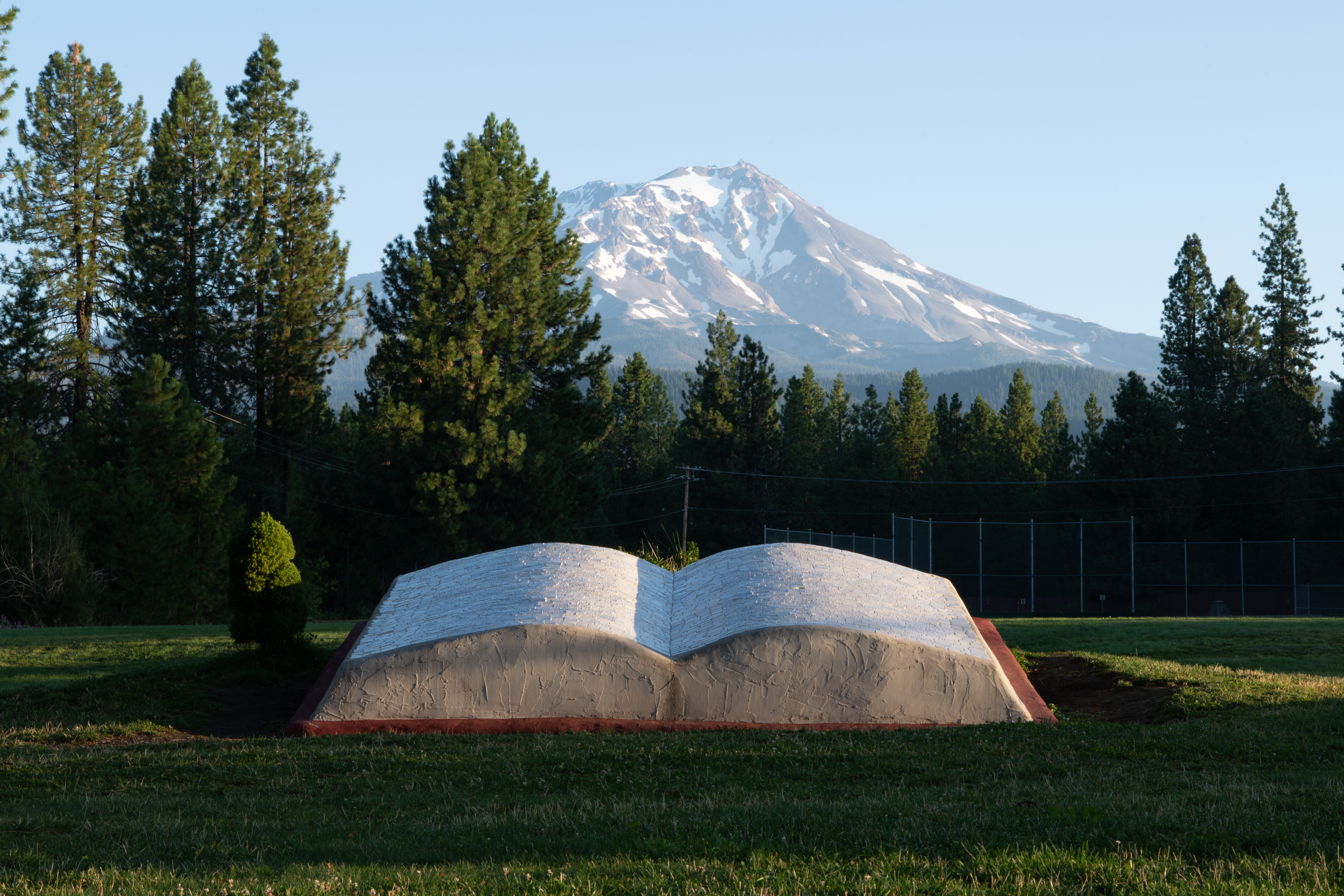
A statue dedicated to Joaquin Miller in Hoo Hoo Park in McCloud, California

A historical marker for his birthplace was unveiled October 10, 1915, on U.S. 27 north of Liberty in Union County, Indiana. Joaquin Miller Cabin is located in Washington, DC. The Hights, the Oakland home Miller built at the end of his life, was purchased by the city of Oakland in 1919, and is known as the Joaquin Miller House, located in Joaquin Miller Park. It is a designated California Historical Landmark. He planted the surrounding trees and he personally built, on the eminence to the north, his own funeral pyre and monuments dedicated to Moses, General John C. Frémont, and the poets Robert Browning and Elizabeth Barrett Browning. Several schools in California are named for him, including Miller Middle School in San Jose, Joaquin Miller Elementary School in Oakland, and Joaquin Miller Elementary School in Burbank.

Joaquin Miller is portrayed by Sean McClory in the Death Valley Days 13th season episode "Magic Locket", which portrays Ina Coolbrith and the love of her life. Actor George Paulsin portrayed a youthful Joaquin Miller in the Death Valley Days episode "Early Candle Lighten", hosted by Dale Robertson. The episode, which aired April 24, 1970, marked Paulsin's first screen appearance and the last of the series' 452 episodes. In the episode, a cook at a gold camp in the Arizona Territory faces hanging for stealing nuggets from the miners. His assistant, "Nat Miller", played by Paulsin, thinks he can save his life by bringing the cook's sister from Tucson. It was at this gold camp that Miller perfected his penchant for western poetry.

In the 1978 British miniseries Lillie, actor Bruce Boa as Miller startles guests when Lillie Langtry arrives at a ball by scattering rose petals in her path.

In 2012, artist Mark Oliver created a large statue called "Joaquin's Book" in Hoo Hoo Park in McCloud, California. The location is near where Miller lived with the Wintus.

== List of works ==
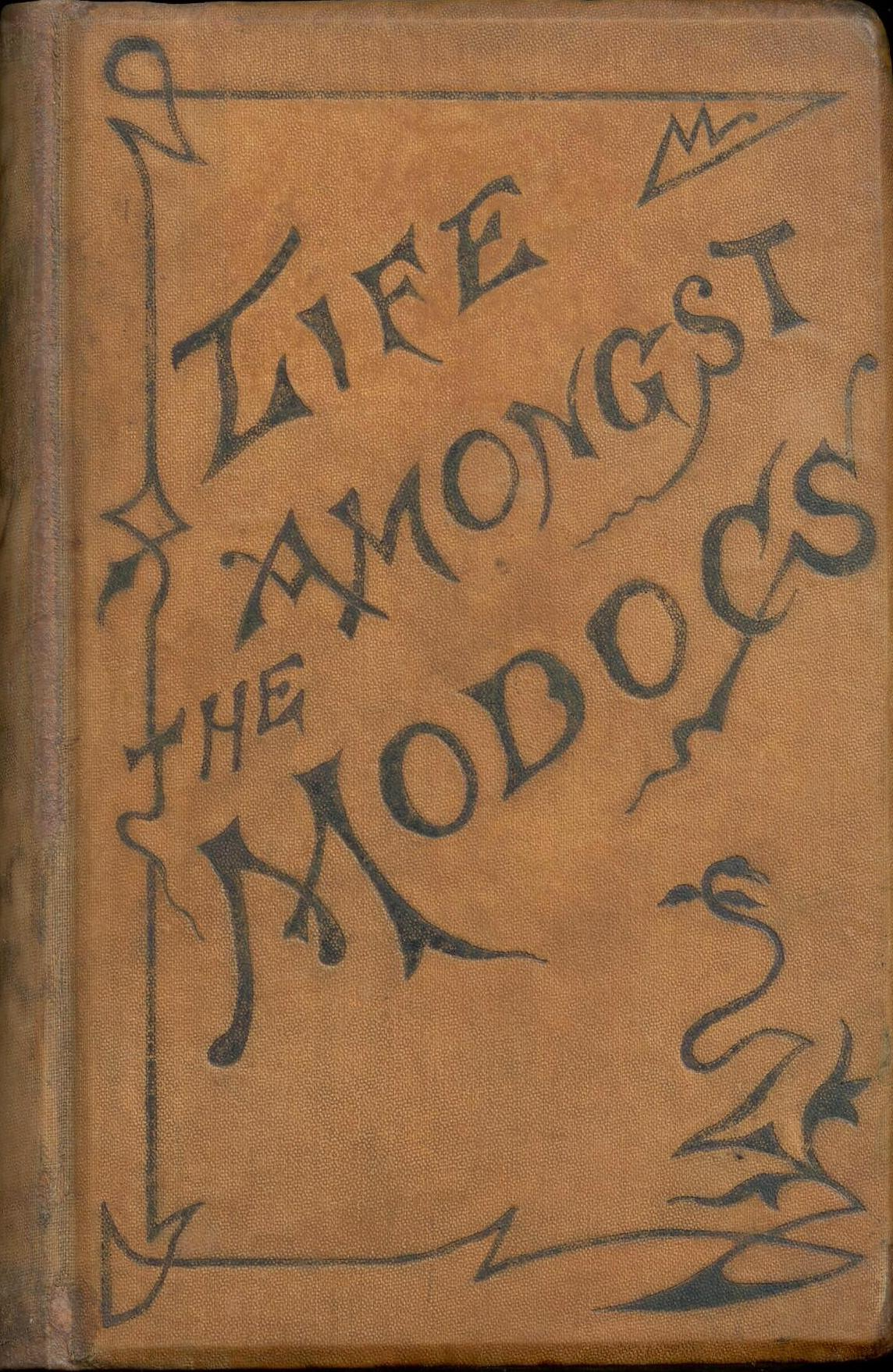
Life Amongst the Modocs (1873)

- Specimens (1868)
- Joaquin et al. (1869)
- Pacific Poems (1871)
- Songs of the Sierras. (1871)
- Songs of the Sun-Lands (1873)
- Life Amongst the Modocs. (1873)
- Arizonian (1874)
- The Ship in the Desert (1875)
- First Fam'lies of the Sierras (1875–76)
- The One Fair Woman (1876)
- The Baroness of New York (1877)
- The Danites (1878)
- Songs of Italy (1878)
- Songs of Far-Away Lands(1878)
- Shadows of Shasta (1881)
- Paquita, The Indian Heroine (1881)
- How to Win in Wall Street (1881) pseud. "A Successful Operator"
- The Silent Man; a Comedy-Drama in four acts(1883)
- Memorie and rime (1884)
- The Destruction of Gotham (1886)
- The Little Gold Miners of the Sierras(1886)
- Songs of the Mexican Seas.(1887)
- In Classic Shades, and Other Poems(1890)
- Songs of the Summer Lands(1892)
- An Illustrated History of the State of Montana(1894)
- The Battle of the Castle Crags (1894)
- Songs of the Soul (1896)
- True Bear Stories (1900)
- Chants for the Boer. (1900)
- The Complete Poetical Works of Joaquin Miller (1902)
- As it Was in the Beginning. (1903)
- The Building of the City Beautiful (1905)
- Light: A Narrative Poem (1907)
- Joaquin Miller's Poems, with an introduction and autobiography (6 vols., San Francisco, 1909–1910)
- The Danites in the Sierras (1910)
- 49: The Gold-Seekers of the Sierras (1910)
- An Elk Hunt
- Columbus; a Short Cantata for Mixed Voices; Music by E.S.Homer(1917)
- Autobiography and Favorite Poems(1919)
- Trelawny with Shelley and Byron(1922)
- Overland in a Covered Wagon; an Autobiography edited by Sidney G. Firman (1930)
- A Royal Highway of the World (1932)
- Joaquin Miller: His California Diary Beginning in 1855 and Ending in 1857; with an Introduction by John S. Richards (1936)
- The Great Discoverer
- The Life of Christ
- An Oregon Idyl
- The White Water Canal
- Exodus for Oregon
- Cuba Libre, with other selections
- Tally-Ho
- Songs of the American Seas

== Sources ==
- Frost, Orcutt William. Joaquin Miller. Twayne Publishers, 1967.
- Marberry, M. M. Splendid Poseur: Joaquin Miller – American Poet. New York: Thomas Y. Crowell Company, 1953.
- Peterson, Martin Severin. Joaquin Miller: Literary Frontiersman. Stanford University Press, 1937.
