= Donna Denizé =

American poet and award-winning teacher

Donna Denizé is an American poet and award-winning teacher at St. Albans School in Washington, D.C. who is Chairwoman of the English Department. She has contributed widely to journals and magazines with essays and poetry, written books of collections of poetry, participated in development of professional training programs for teachers as well as programs for students of multiple public schools. Some of her work has appeared in anthologies and magazines and she has contributed to some Corporation for Public Broadcasting print and video media. Denizé also acted in the movie "Locked Up: A Mother's Rage".

== Background ==
Denizé is an American of Haitian descent, and a native of Cape Cod, Massachusetts. Denizé has lived in the Washington D.C. area since 1978.

Denizé holds an undergraduate degree from Stonehill College, where she was a student of Poet Laureate Robert Hayden, and an M.A. from Howard University in Renaissance Drama. She has received grants from the Bread Loaf School of English (using the accommodation of Lincoln College at the University of Oxford), Johns Hopkins Summer Writing Program, the Humanities Council of Washington, DC, and the Folger Shakespeare Library. In 1981 she participated in the World Order Magazine Commemorative Issue to Robert Hayden.

== Appointments, honors, invited contributions ==
In 1980 she served through appointment by Governor Charles Robb to The Virginia State Advisory Board on Vocational Education. In 2003, she was awarded by Williams College the George Olmsted, Jr., Class of 1924 Prize for Excellence in Secondary School Teaching, and in 2004, she was appointed to the Board of Trustees of American Shakespeare Center, a national destination and resource for audiences, actors, students, scholars, and educators, based at the Blackfriars Playhouse in Staunton, Virginia. She currently teaches literature at St. Albans School, where she teaches Shakespeare, American literature, and freshman English, serves as chair of the Faculty Diversity Committee and faculty advisor of the school's literary magazine and during the summer teaches in the Washington National Cathedral's summer program called Cathedral Scholars, an outreach program of academic enrichment which serves students from 15 different D.C. public schools. She is a recipient of the Distinguished Teacher Award from the White House Presidential Scholars Program.

Denizé has been invited/appointed to numerous workshops, panel discussions, readings and other responsibilities at:

- EDP Literature Institute
- Howard University
- Corcoran Museum of Art
- The Library of Congress
- WPFW The Poet and The Poem, hosted by Grace Cavalieri
- Martin Luther King Jr. Library
- One of eight invited teacher's for Annenberg/CPB Channel's eight part mini-series, In Search of the Novel doing a lesson plan on Great Expectations.
- Denizé is also the Baháʼí Chaplain for American University, a position she has held since at least 2008.

== Poetry and publications ==
Denizé's poetry has appeared in the book Hungry As We Are. Denizé published a selection of poems titled The Lover's Voice in 1997 (Hickory House Press) and Broken Like Job ISBN 0-915380-60-9 in 2005 (The Word Works). She has also been a contributor to scholarly books and journals, including Shakespeare Set Free (ISBN 0743288505), Innisfree Journal of Poetry, Gargoyle Magazine's Gargoyle 49 CD, and Orison. She has published essays like 'Use of Color in Selected Shakespearean Works' in Folger Shakespeare Library and 'A Scholar's Journey: Reflections on W.E.B. DuBois and the Power of Education' in Teacher's Digest, an educational magazine from The Corporation for Public Broadcasting. Denizé has also contributed to programs of National Council of Teachers of English, National Endowment for the Humanities, Mobil Masterpiece Theatre, the Annenberg Foundation, and the Smithsonian Institution.
