= Mary Jo Salter =

American poet

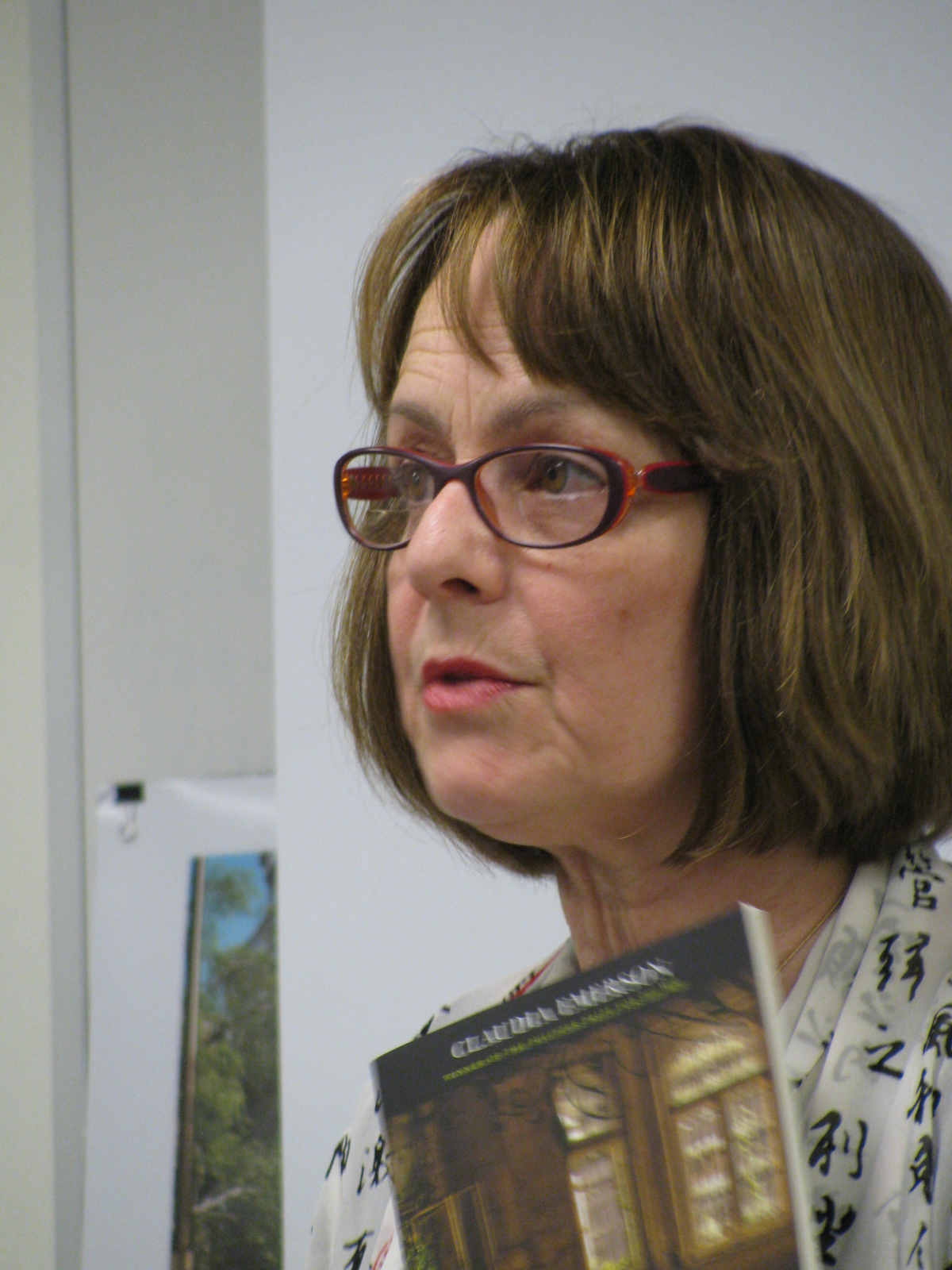
- Born: August 15, 1954 (age 72); Grand Rapids, Michigan
- Education: Harvard University Cambridge University
- Occupations: Poet, editor
- Writing career
- Genre: Poetry

Mary Jo Salter (born August 15, 1954) is an American poet, a co-editor of multiple editions of The Norton Anthology of Poetry and professor emerita in the Writing Seminars program at Johns Hopkins University.

== Life ==
Salter was born in Grand Rapids, Michigan and was raised in Detroit and Baltimore, Maryland. She received her B.A. from Harvard University in 1976 and her M.A. from Cambridge University in 1978. In 1976, she participated in the Glascock Prize contest.

While at Harvard, she studied with the noted poet Elizabeth Bishop. She has been an editor at the Atlantic Monthly and at The New Republic.

From 1984 to 2007, she taught at Mount Holyoke College and was, from 1995 to 2007, a vice-president of the Poetry Society of America.

She has two daughters, Emily and Hilary Leithauser.

She is on the editorial board of the literary magazine The Common, based at Amherst College.

== Works ==
=== Books of poetry ===
- Henry Purcell in Japan, Knopf, 1985, ISBN 978-0-394-53657-6
- Unfinished Painting, Knopf, 1989, ISBN 978-0-394-57417-2, Lamont Selection for that year's most distinguished second volume of poetry
- Sunday Skaters, A.A. Knopf, 1994, ISBN 978-0-679-43109-1, nominated in 1994 for the National Book Critics Circle Award (Knopf)
- A Kiss in Space, Knopf, 1999, ISBN 978-0-375-40531-0
- Open Shutters, Alfred A. Knopf, 2003, ISBN 978-1-4000-4008-7, named a "notable book of the year" by The New York Times
- A Phone Call to the Future: New and Selected Poems
- Nothing by Design, Knopf, 2013, ISBN 978-0-385-34979-6
- The Surveyors, Knopf, 2017, ISBN 978-1-524-73266-0
- Zoom Rooms, Knopf, 2022

=== Edited ===
- The Norton Anthology of Poetry, W. W. Norton, 1996, ISBN 978-0-393-96820-0 (co-editor)

=== Selected translations ===
- The Word Exchange: Anglo-Saxon Poems in Translation (W. W. Norton & Company, 2010)

=== Play ===
- Falling Bodies (2004)

=== Children's literature ===
- The Moon Comes Home (1989)

=== Articles ===
- The Achiever: Helen Keller by Mary Jo Salter

== Awards ==
- 1981: The Frost Place poet in residence
- 1995–1996: Amy Lowell Poetry Travelling Scholarship
- 1989: Lamont Poetry Prize for the year’s most distinguished second volume of poetry - Unfinished Painting
- 2003: Open Shutters named a "notable book of the year" by The New York Times
- 2004: Meribeth E. Cameron Faculty Award for Scholarship
