= Joaquin Miller House =

Historic place in Oakland, California

- U.S. National Register of Historic Places
- U.S. National Historic Landmark
- California Historical Landmark No. 107
- Oakland Designated Landmark
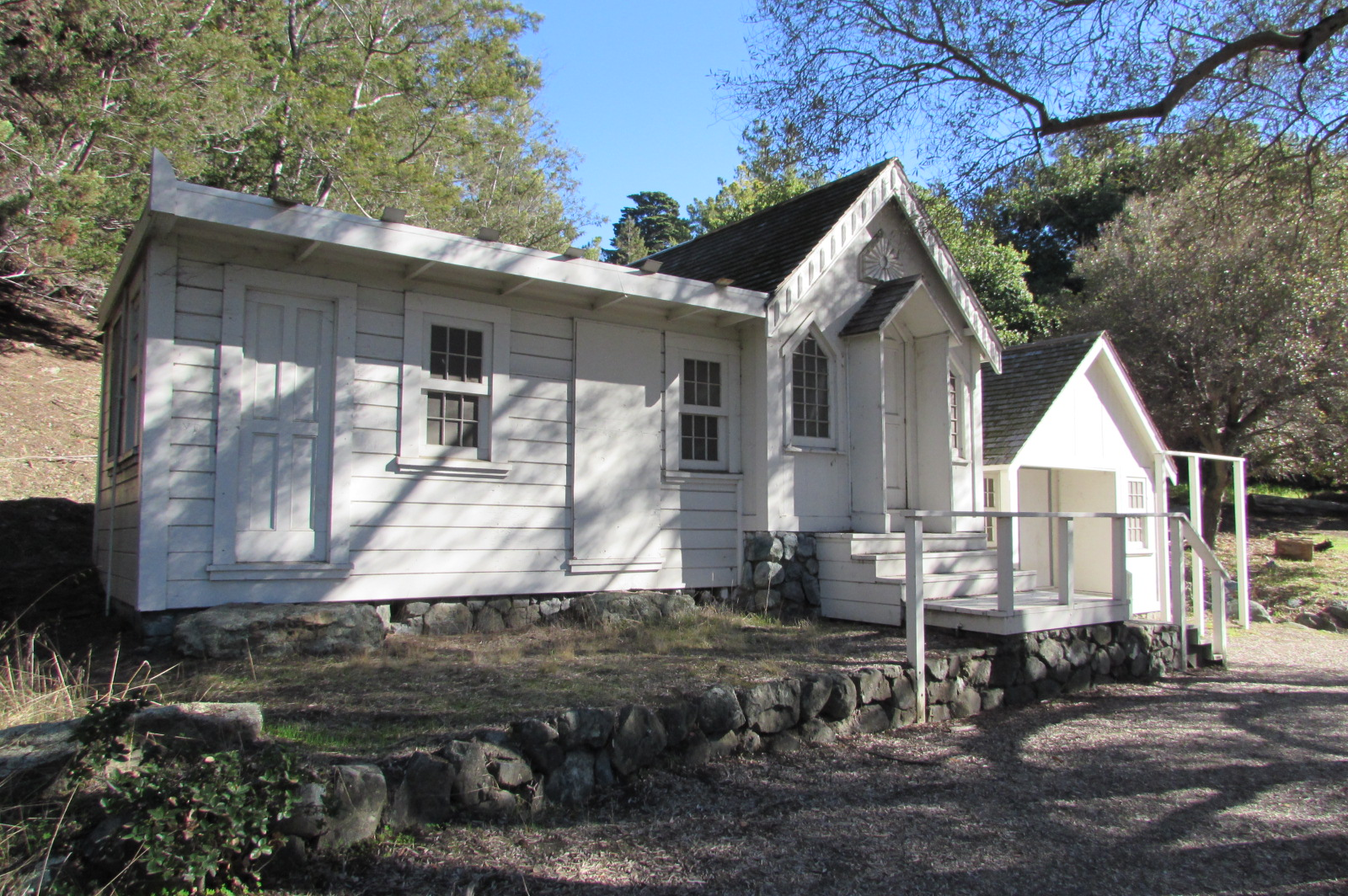
- The house in 2015

- Location within Oakland, California Location within California Location within the United States
- Location: 3300 Joaquin Miller Rd., Oakland, California
- Coordinates: 37.81067°N 122.19303°W
- Area: 14 acres (5.7 ha)
- Built: 1886
- Architect: Joaquin Miller
- Architectural style: Victorian
- NRHP reference No.: 66000204
- CHISL No.: 107
- ODL No.: 5

Significant dates
- Added to NRHP: October 15, 1966
- Designated NHL: December 29, 1962
- Designated CHISL: 1933

The Joaquin Miller House, also known as The Abbey, is a historic house in Joaquin Miller Park, a public park in the Oakland Hills area of Oakland, California, United States. A crude, vaguely Gothic structure, it was the home of poet Joaquin Miller from 1886 until his death in 1913. Miller was one of the nation's first poets to write about the far western United States. The property, which includes several idiosyncratic monuments created by Miller, was designated a National Historic Landmark in 1962.

== Description ==
The Joaquin Miller House stands on the southern edge of Joaquin Miller Park, at the northwest corner of the western junction of Joaquin Miller Road with Sanborn Drive, the park's main circulating road. The house is a modest single-story structure, essentially little more than three separate rooms that have been joined. Two of them are covered by gabled roofs, and have only vague vernacular references to Gothic Revival architecture. The third section is covered by a flat roof which has broad overhanging eaves. To this section is attached a wooden leanto of unknown function.

== Joaquin Miller ==
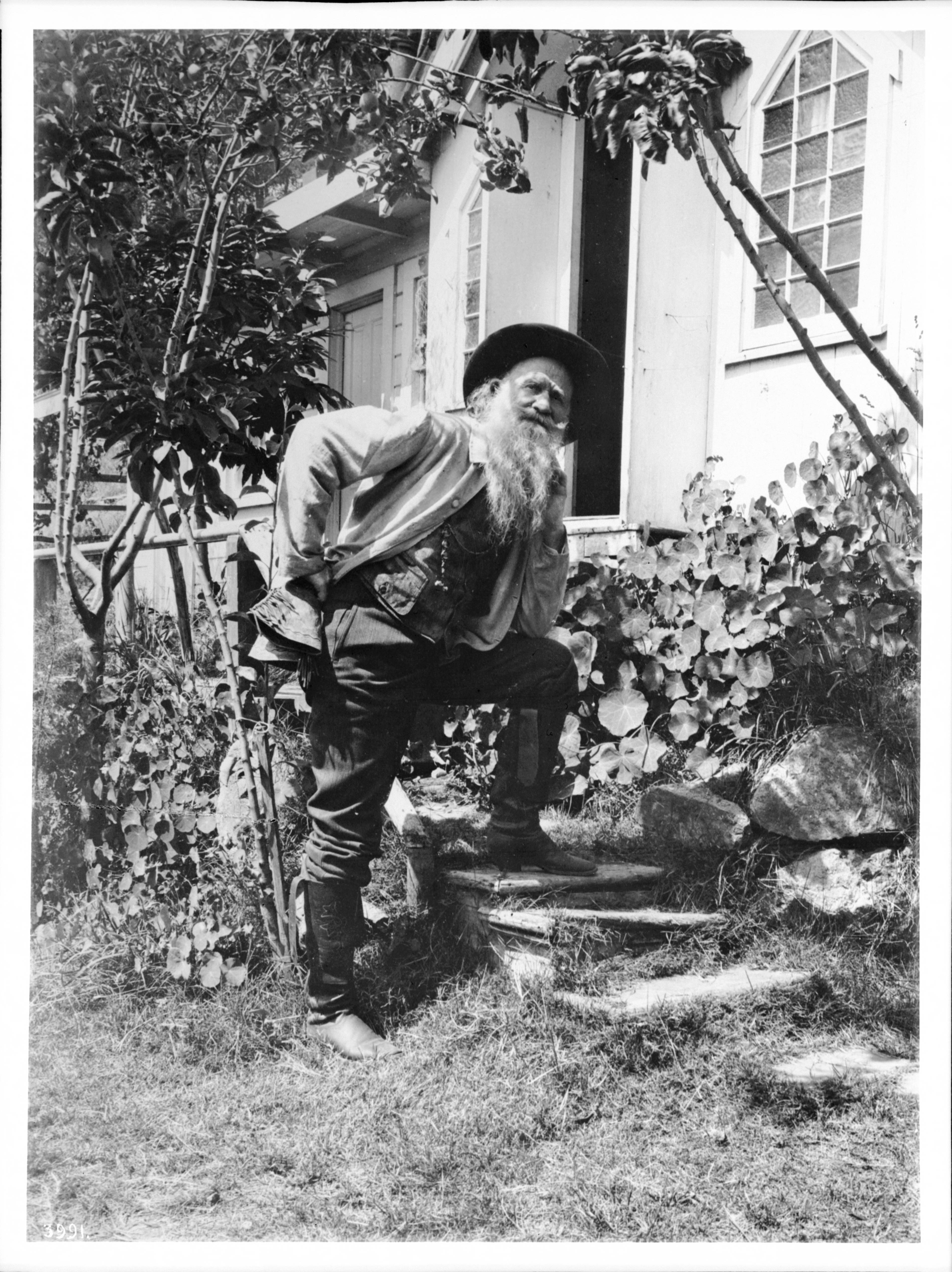
Joaquin Miller at his home, ca. 1898

Joaquin Miller, born in 1837 in Indiana, grew up in the Oregon Territory, and spent years as a young man in California during the Gold Rush years. Poorly educated, he had a gift for verse and showmanship, and he used his experiences in the far west as material for both his poetry and touring presentations. He was particularly popular in England, and is best known for his 1871 book Songs of the Sierras.

Miller had relocated to Washington, D. C., in 1883 and built a log cabin there while he unsuccessfully attempted a political career. He instead made his way to California and sold the cabin for $5,100 in 1887. In 1886 Miller purchased 100 acres (40 ha) of land in Oakland he named "The Hights". He lived there until his death in 1913. He first built a rustic one-room cabin out of redwood logs for himself and his mother, who joined him from Oregon. He then built a more elaborate home he called "The Abbey", likely named both after his third wife Abigail and as a reference to Lord Byron's home Newstead Abbey, and hosted literary figures including the young Jack London and Frank Norris.

He planted the surrounding trees and he personally built, on the eminence to the north, his own funeral pyre (eventually used to scatter his previously cremated ashes), and monuments dedicated to Moses, explorer General John C. Frémont, and the poets Robert and Elizabeth Barrett Browning.

Beginning in 1894, the Japanese poet Yone Noguchi worked as a laborer in exchange for room and board while living in the cabin adjoining Miller's. He published his first book, Seen or Unseen; or, Monologues of a Homeless Snail during this time. Though he referred to Miller as "the most natural man", Noguchi found his years living there difficult and later fictionalized his experience in his book The American Diary of a Japanese Girl. He referred to The Abbey as "Miller's sanctum or Holy Grotto".

Miller died at The Abbey on February 17, 1913, after saying his last words, "Take me away; take me away!" He had built his own funeral pyre at The Hights and asked to be cremated there with no religious ceremony and without being embalmed. His wishes were not followed and his funeral on February 19 drew thousands. He had left no will and his estate — estimated at $100,000 — was divided between his wife, Abigail, and daughter, Juanita.

== Landmark ==
The city of Oakland purchased the Hights in 1919. It was declared a National Historic Landmark in 1962. The simple Victorian style house is also listed on the National Register of Historic Places on October 15, 1966. The landmarked area is 14 acres (5.7 ha) in size, and includes the house and the various monuments erected by Miller.

== See also ==
- Joaquin Miller Cabin - Washington, DC
- List of National Historic Landmarks in California
- National Register of Historic Places listings in Alameda County, California
