= Minnie Myrtle Miller =

American poet

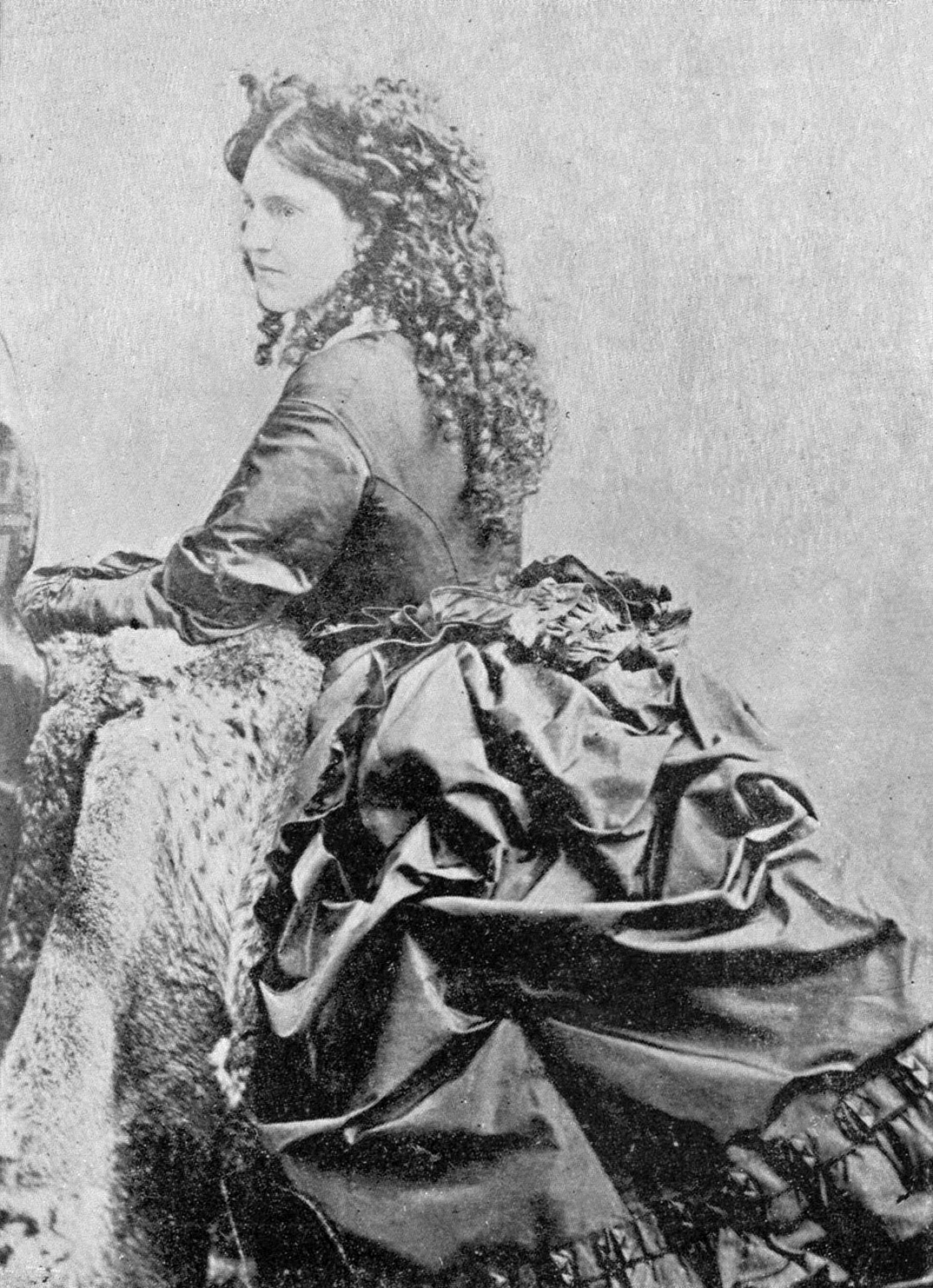
- Born: Theresa Dyer; May 2, 1842; Brookville, Indiana, U.S.
- Died: May 15, 1882 (aged 40); New York City, New York, U.S.
- Resting place: Cemetery of the Evergreens
- Occupations: poet, author
- Spouse(s): Joaquin Miller (m. 1861; div. 1870); Thomas E. L. Logan (m. 1877)
- Children: 3
- Writing career
- Pen name: Minnie Myrtle; Minnie Myrtle Miller

Theresa Dyer, better known by her pen names, Minnie Myrtle and Minnie Myrtle Miller (May 2, 1842 – May 15, 1882), was an American writer of prose and verse. She was a frequent contributor to newspapers, writing under her pen name, "Minnie Myrtle", before her marriage to Joaquin Miller, and as "Minnie Myrtle Miller" thereafter.

== Early life ==
Theresa Dyer (Note: The California State Library (1912) records her maiden name as Minnie Theresa Dyer.) was born in Brookville, Indiana, May 2, 1845. Her parents were Aaron and Sarah A. Dyer. The family removed to Oregon in 1859, making their home on a farm or ranch at the mouth of Elk River, in Curry County, The father kept a ferry near Horas Creek about 7 miles (11 km) south of Port Orford, Oregon.

Dyer was described as a precocious and attractive child. Her older sister, Ada (or Emma), married Captain Charles Hilburn (or Hilbron), an old mariner who retired from his many voyages with a small fortune, and lived at Coos Bay.

== Career ==
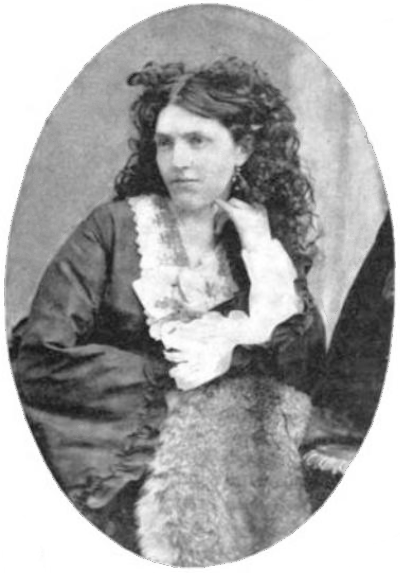
Minnie Myrtle Miller, 1872

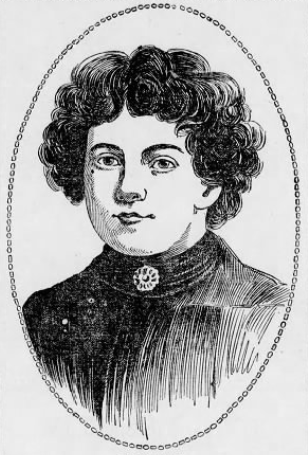
Maud Miller, one of her children

While living in Port Orford, Dyer's early poetry was published in the Albany Democrat and the Golden Era, signed "Minnie Myrtle".

Dyer taught school in Lane County, Oregon. She had a taste for literature and began writing for Joaquin Miller's paper. Her contributions in prose and verse attracted attention. Dyer's writing focused on her home, her friends, and where she lived. With the quick ear for the musical, which characterized all her writings, she adopted the pen name of "Minnie Myrtle", and sent her productions—both prose and verse—to the neighboring weekly papers. Her future husband, Cincinnatus Heine Miller, later known as "Joaquin Miller", was at that time writing for the same papers, wild, weird and sometimes bloodthirsty stories, signed "Giles Gaston." In one of these, in which he thrillingly depicted a battle on the border with the Indians, he expressed a desire to become acquainted with the sweet singer of the Coquelle, whoever she might be. In Dyer's next story, her address was provided. Their correspondence began when he mailed her an appreciative letter, which enclosed a tintype picture of himself. He was tall, strong, and attractive.

In the summer of 1861, Joaquin was riding Mossman and Miller's Pony Express, carrying letters and gold dust between Walla Walla, Washington, and the newly opened mines at Millersburg (now Florence, Idaho). Attracted by certain contributions of “Minnie Myrtle" appearing in the newspapers of his pack, he wrote to her and had replies. In 1863, he began to edit The Democratic Register in Eugene, Oregon. His entrance into journalism brought him again to the attention of his unknown correspondent, “Minnie Myrtle," who was then living in a mining and lumber camp at Port Orford by the sea, not far from the southern boundary of Oregon. His version of their relationship was set forth in Memorie and Rime:— "Tall, dark, and striking in every respect, ... this first Saxon woman I had ever addressed had it all her own way at once. She knew nothing at all of my life, except that I was an expressman and country editor. I knew nothing at all of hers, but I found her with kind, good parents, surrounded by brothers and sisters, and the pet and spoiled child of the mining and lumber camp... The heart of the bright and merry girl was brimming full of romance, hope, and happiness. I arrived on Thursday. On Sunday next we were married! Oh, to what else but ruin and regret could such romantic folly lead? Procuring a horse for her, we set out at once to return to my post, far away over the mountains."

After a week's ride, the bridal couple reached their intended home in Eugene,— "but only to find that my paper had been suppressed by the Government, and we resolved to seek our fortunes in San Francisco. But we found neither fortune nor friends in that great city."

Joaquin's failure to establish a literary or journalistic connection in the city may have dashed Dyer's spirits. At any rate, Joaquin stated that even while they were living in San Francisco, she had presentiments of "wreck and storm and separation for us." If thwarted aspiration for more literary and social life than she had enjoyed in the lumber camp had stimulated these presentiments, they must have been strengthened when Joaquin bought a band of cattle and journeyed with his wife and baby to a new mining camp at Canyon City, Oregon.

There, he found success, being elected in 1866 for a four-year term as judge of the Grant County, Oregon court.— "Often I never left my office till ... dawn. My health gave way... all this, ... did not suit the merryhearted and spoiled child of the mines at all. She became the spoiled child here that she had been at her father's, and naturally grew impatient at my persistent toil and study... She was good all the time... But she was not happy here."

At the end of two years serving as a judge, and earning US$1,200 a year, Joaquin suddenly resigned, sent Dyer and her children home to her father, with instructions to get a divorce, and he left for Europe. It had been Joaquin's ambition for years to go to Europe and become famous. In fact, he felt that he was gifted and the duties of providing for a family, and the annoyance of children conflicted with his dreams and literary whims.

Dyer filed for divorce on April 4, 1870, claiming they had a third child, Henry Mark, the year before and that Joaquin was "wholly" neglectful. The court declared them divorced on April 19, and Dyer was granted custody of the baby while the two older children, Maud and George, were left in the care of her mother. Joaquin was ordered to pay US$200 per year in child support. He never denied her charges that he was neglectful of her and their children and was rarely home.

Before Joaquin left for London, he placed Maud in the Convent of Loretto, Ontario, Canada.

After Joaquin had been in England about a year, he published his poems, found fame and fortune, and then visited Oregon. Before his arrival, his private life was severely criticised, but Dyer published a letter at Portland urging the public to accord him an honorable reception. He visited his family, but offered no assistance financially, and then left for the East Coast, at which point Dyer bitterly assailed him. Dyer sympathized with her husband's projects, and she believed them to be justified by their practical results.— "Mr. Miller, felt that he had gifts of the mind, and if his system of economy was rigid and hard to endure, it was at least a success; and if he needed all his money to carry out his plans, I am satisfied that he thus used it. . . As we are both mortals, it would be affectation in me were I to profess to take upon myself all the blame, but I ask to bear my full share. . . . Good sometimes comes of evil. Our separation and sorrows produced the poems of 'Myrrh' and 'Even So.'"

After a time, Joaquin returned to the U.S., and in 1872, Dyer was on his trail. She came down to San Francisco and delivered her celebrated lecture, on "Joaquin Miller, the Poet and the man", though not without critique. In the preparation of it, she was liberally assisted by Charles Warren Stoddard, Sam Williams, and other lesser literary luminaries. Dyer was bitter and relentless. Her lecture drew a large audience. Joaquin refused her request that she might be allowed to see her young daughter, who, for three years, had been sent to a convent school in Canada.

Dyer came to San Francisco and wrote for local journals. She also delivered lectures, mainly on Oregon and Western themes, throughout the East. After Joaquin left the U.S. again, Dyer arrived in Chicago to take vengeance on him. Though she had planned to make Joaquin the subject of a lecture there, she was advised that it would only injure her own children. She acted on the advice and selected another topic. The night she was to lecture was one of the coldest in the city. The lecture was a complete failure, and the next morning, she was in tears. Her business manager, Mr. Kinne of San Francisco, had left for California, leaving her penniless and with her board bill in arrears. After her affairs were quickly rearranged, she left for Ohio where her relatives resided. That autumn, she returned to Chicago and appeared well supplied with funds. She repaid her loans.

A couple of years later, she was in San Francisco, writing for Sunday Call, and thus endeavoring to support herself, her mother, and three children. Joaquin was willing to pay her a monthly allowance if she would remain in Oregon, but would not give her a cent while she resided in San Francisco. She chose to stay in San Francisco. Their daughter, Maud, was 13 or 14 years old at the time.

After a sojourn to Oregon in 1877, Dyer married Thomas E. L. Logan (1858–1908), age 22; she was 31. He was a member of the police force of Portland. He was a bright, handsome fellow, but also a drunkard, and she left him.

== Later life and death ==
Back in San Francisco, Dyer resumed her writing.

When Joaquin became sick, was without money, and was almost homeless, news of his condition reached Dyer. She came to New York City to nurse her former husband in what was thought to be his death call. Joaquin did not die, but Dyer, after nursing him back to health, sickened.

In early May 1882, it was reported by the press that Dyer was dying in New Jersey. Joaquin did all that was possible for Dyer. Dyer's last request was to see Maud once more, and in 24 hours, Maud was at her mother's bedside.

On May 15, 1882, after a long illness and great suffering, Dyer died in New York City at the New York Infirmary for Women and Children of pneumonia and tuberculosis. Dyer was interred in the Cemetery of the Evergreens, Brooklyn. She left unfinished several poems and a sketch of her life which she tried to complete before death. It was never published, the manuscript having been misplaced and could not be found. A key to her last days appears to be given in these lines of her poem, "At the Land's End."

"I am conscript—hurrid to battle
With fates—yet I fain would be
Vanquished and silenced forever
And driven back to my sea.
Oh! to leave this strife, this turmoil,
Leave all undone and skim
Wth the clouds that flee to the hill tops
And rest forever with Him."

== Selected works ==
She was the author of one-half the poems contained in the first book written by Joaquin, entitled, Joaquin, et al..

Many people believe that Joaquin incorporated poems of hers into the Songs of the Sierras.
