= Gjertrud Schnackenberg =

American poet (born 1953)

- Born: August 27, 1953 (age 73); Tacoma, Washington
- Education: Mount Holyoke College
- Occupations: Poet, writer
- Employer(s): Massachusetts Institute of Technology; Washington University in St. Louis

Gjertrud Schnackenberg (/ˈjɛərtruːd ˈʃnækənbɜːrɡ/; born August 27, 1953, in Tacoma, Washington) is an American poet.

== Life ==
Schnackenberg graduated from Mount Holyoke College in 1975. She lectured at Massachusetts Institute of Technology and Washington University in St. Louis, and was Writer-in-Residence at Smith College and visiting fellow at St. Catherine's College, Oxford, in 1997.

The Throne of Labdacus, one of Schnackenberg's six books of poetry, focuses on the myth of Oedipus and the stories of ancient Greece. In A Gilded Lapse of Time she devotes a section to the life, poetry, and death of Dante.

Schnackenberg has received the Rome Prize in Creative Literature from the American Academy in Rome and the Berlin Prize from the American Academy in Berlin. She has been awarded a grant from the National Endowment for the Arts, and in 1987 she received a Guggenheim grant. She has been a fellow of the American Academy of Arts and Sciences since 1996. In 1997, she was the Christensen Visiting Fellow at St. Catherine's College, Oxford, and in 2000 she was a visiting scholar at the Getty Research Institute for the History of Art and the Humanities.

Schnackenberg was married to the American philosopher Robert Nozick until his death in 2002.

== Awards and honors ==
Schnackenberg has been awarded the Academy Award in Literature from the American Academy of Arts and Letters, the Berlin Prize from the American Academy in Berlin, and the Rome Prize in Creative Literature from the American Academy in Rome, as well as fellowships from the National Endowment for the Arts, Radcliffe Institute, and the Guggenheim Foundation. Today, she travels around the world reading her poetry in public, university, and conference settings.

- 2011: Heavenly Questions wins the 2011 International Griffin Poetry Prize
- 2001: Los Angeles Times Book Prize for Poetry for The Throne of Labdacus
- 2000: The Throne of Labdacus named a "notable book of the year" by The New York Times
- 1998: American Academy of Arts and Letters Awards, Rome Prize in Literature
- 1984–1985: Amy Lowell Poetry Travelling Scholarship
- 1984 Younger Poets Award from Academy of American Poets
- 1973 and 1974: Glascock Prize from Mount Holyoke College

== Works ==
- Heavenly Questions. Bloodaxe Books UK. 2011. ISBN 978-1-85224-922-9.
- Heavenly Questions: Poems. Farrar, Straus and Giroux. 2010. ISBN 978-0-374-28307-0.
- The Throne of Labdacus. Farrar, Straus and Giroux. 2000. ISBN 978-0-374-52796-9.
- Supernatural Love: Poems 1976-2000. Bloodaxe Books UK. 2001. ISBN 978-1-85224-561-0.
- Supernatural Love: Poems 1976-1992. Farrar, Straus and Giroux. 2000. ISBN 978-0-374-52754-9.
- A Gilded Lapse of Time. Farrar, Straus and Giroux. 1992. ISBN 978-0-374-52399-2.
- The Lamplit Answer. Farrar Straus & Giroux. 1985. ISBN 978-0-374-51978-0.
- Portraits and Elegies. D.R. Godine. 1982. ISBN 978-0-87923-368-6.
