= Joaquin Miller Cabin =

Historic house in Washington, D.C., United States

- U.S. Historic district – Contributing property
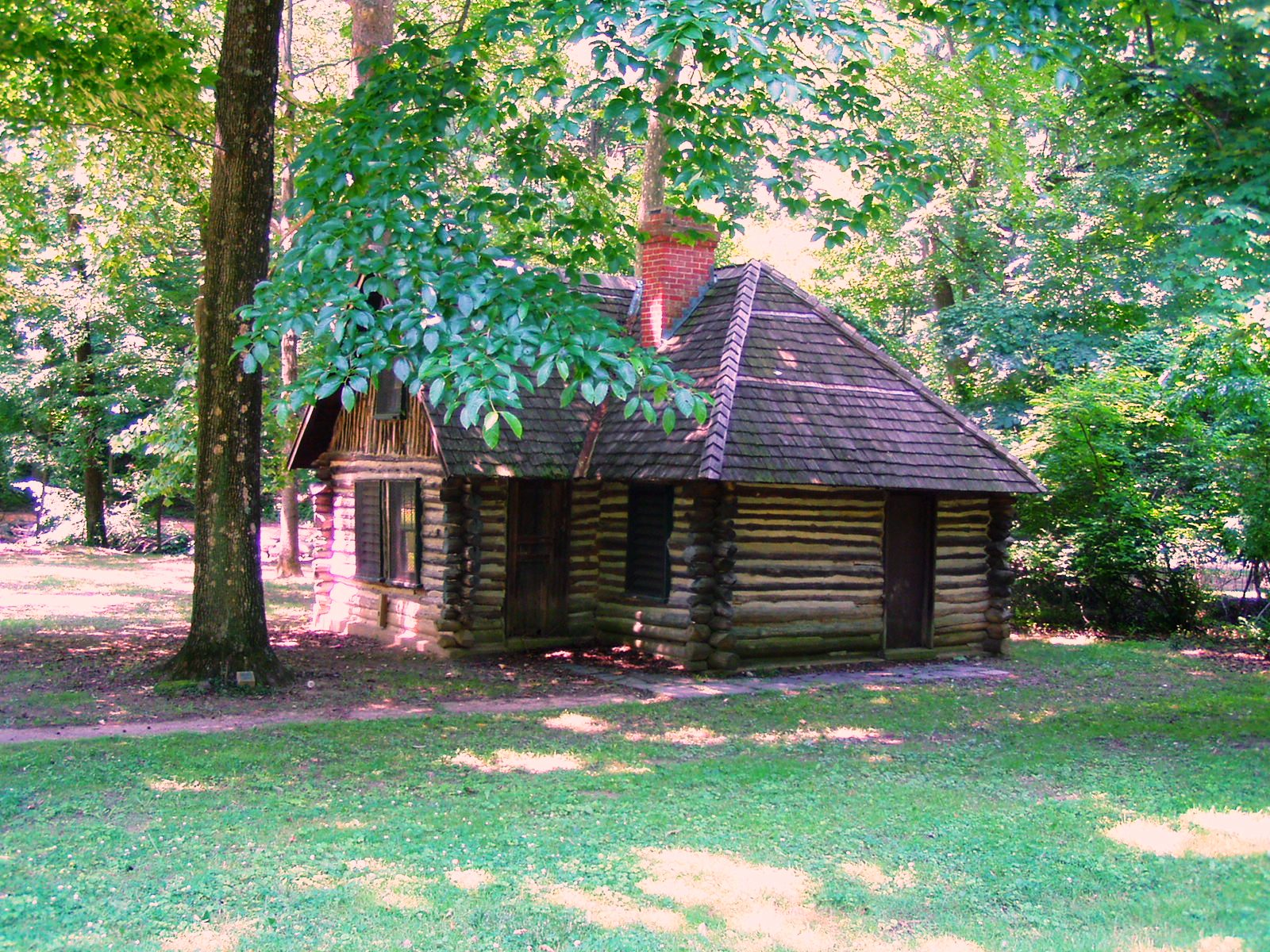

- Location within the District of Columbia Location within the United States
- Location: Near Picnic Grove 6 on Beach Drive, N.W. in Rock Creek Park, Washington, D.C.
- Coordinates: 38.96402°N 77.04633°W
- Built: 1883
- Architect: Joaquin Miller
- Architectural style: Vernacular
- Part of: Rock Creek Park Historic District (ID91001524)
- Designated CP: October 23, 1991

The Joaquin Miller Cabin is an historic structure situated in Washington, DC's Rock Creek Park. Built by the American poet, essayist and fabulist Joaquin Miller, it represents the only known example of late 19th century Rustic-style log cabin in Washington, D.C. It is a Classified Structure within Rock Creek Park.

== History ==
=== Joaquin Miller ===
In 1883, Joaquin Miller (1837–1913) moved to Washington, DC to get involved in politics, which proved unsuccessful. He built the cabin near the intersection of 16th and Belmont Streets, NW across from present day Meridian Hill Park to find rustic peace and "find his muse". Miller lived here from 1883 to late 1885 when he left for California. He sold the cabin for $5,100 in 1887.

=== Preservation ===
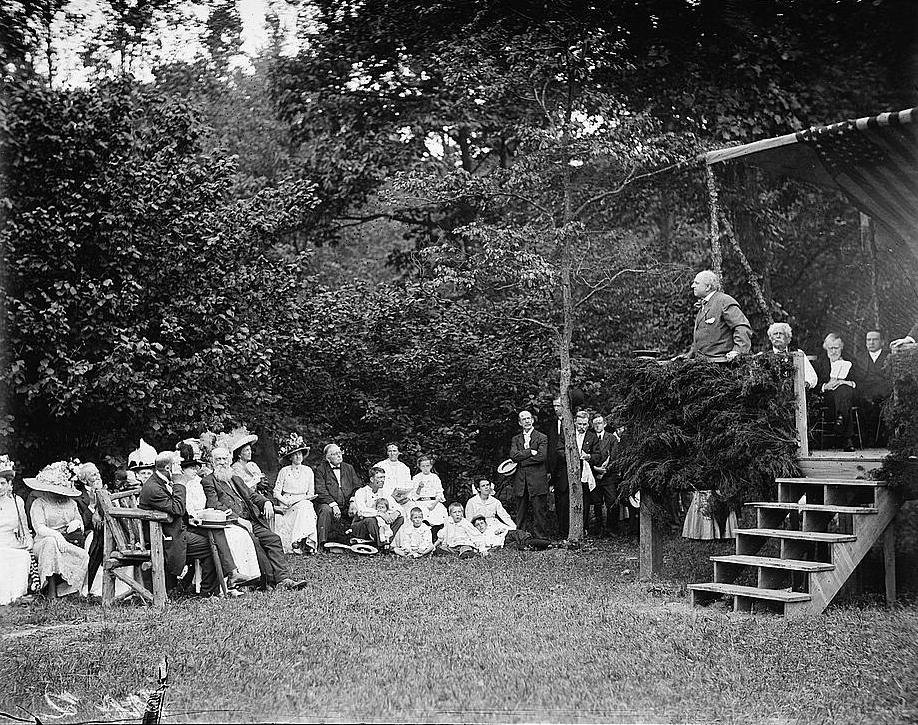
Dedication of Miller Cabin, June 12, 1912, Library of Congress

In 1911, the area near Meridian Hill Park was being developed and Henry White, the former ambassador to France, was building an estate on land that included the cabin. The state of California and the Columbia Historical Society sought to save the structure from demolition and have it moved to Rock Creek Park. The board of the National Park Service refused the request but Senator John D. Works, and Joseph R. Knowland of California successfully intervened to force the Park Service to move the cabin to its present location near the east bank of Rock Creek one half mile north of Military Road.

In acquiescing to the public campaign to save the cabin the Board of Control for the Park insisted that they be allowed to use the cabin as a shelter and reserved the right to remove the cabin at any time. The cabin was initially used as a shelter and dedicated on June 2, 1912, with ceremonies featuring members of California's congressional delegation and Senator Weldon B. Heyburn of Idaho.

In 1931, the cabin was leased to the poet's niece, Pherne Miller, who sold beverages and food and conducted art classes in the cabin until the mid-1950s.

== Architecture ==
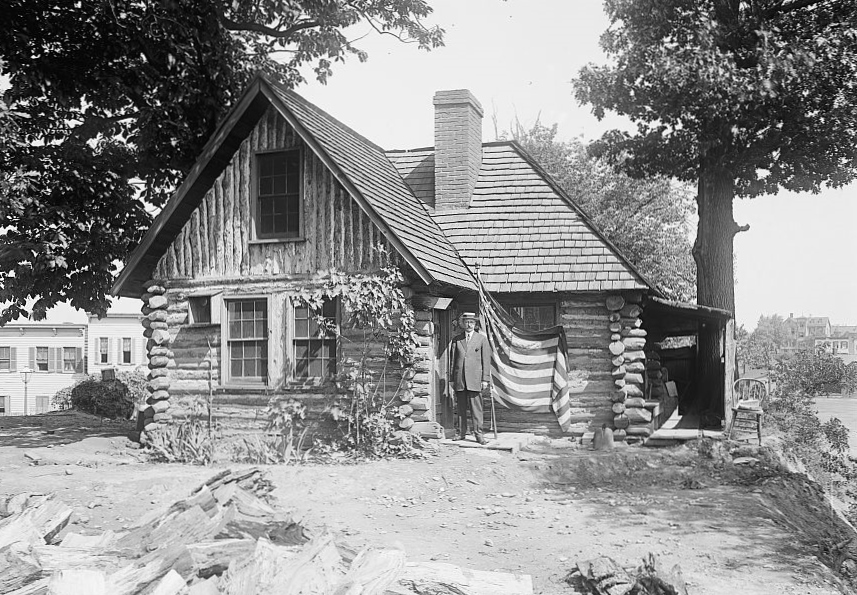
Miller Cabin at Meridian Hill

Miller built the cabin as a replication of his early home in Shasta County, California, and as he later wrote, "to teach that a log cabin can be made very comfortable, with content at hand". The structure is one and a half stories and constructed of saddle-notched logs and a steeply pitched cross-gabled roof covered by shingles. It is an example of vernacular architecture and a rare log cabin structure in the nation's capital. The exterior of the L-shaped cabin was constructed of split logs and chinking with a fieldstone fireplace at the center of the cabin. The cabin was painstakingly deconstructed and moved in 1911.

== Joaquin Miller Poetry Series ==
From 1973 to 2011 the cabin hosted the oldest continuous reading series in Washington through the Miller Cabin Poetry Series run by nonprofit literary and educational organization Word Works. In 1978 the series was held inside the cabin, until audiences outgrew the space. The readings were then held outdoors on the cabin grounds. In 2011 the reading series was relocated to the Rock Creek Nature Center and dropped the "cabin" from the series name, changing it to the Joaquin Miller Poetry Series. The series has been documented in two anthologies of the participating poets, Whose Woods These Are and Cabin Fever: Poets at Miller's Cabin. Sample poems in the Joaquin Miller series include The Three Laughers of Tiger Ravine by David Wolinsky. The final reading for the series was held on June 9, 2022, and included a tribute to Jacklyn Potter, who ran the series for 22 years.

== See also ==
- Joaquin Miller House - Oakland, California
- National Register of Historic Places listings in the District of Columbia
