= Joaquin Miller Park =

Public park in Oakland, California

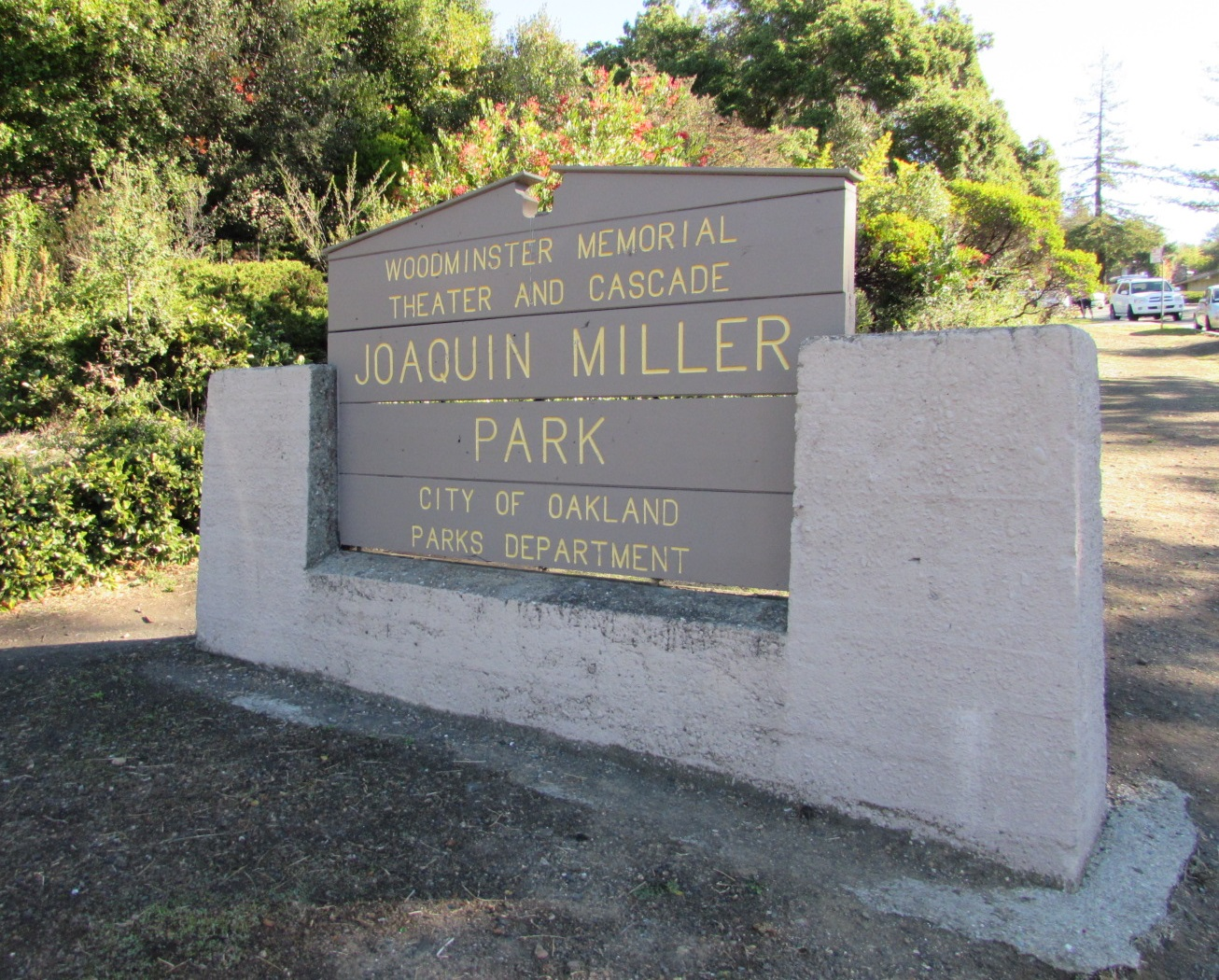
- Sign for Joaquin Miller Park

- Location within Oakland, California Location within California Location within the United States
- Location: Oakland
- Coordinates: 37°48′40.21″N 122°11′21.64″W
- Area: 500 acres (2,000,000 m^{2})
- Opened: 1919
- Operator: East Bay Regional Park District

Joaquin Miller Park is a large open space park in the Oakland Hills owned and operated by the city of Oakland, California. It is named after early California writer and poet Joaquin Miller, who bought the land in the 1880s, naming it "The Hights" [sic], and lived in the house preserved as the Joaquin Miller House.

== Park ==
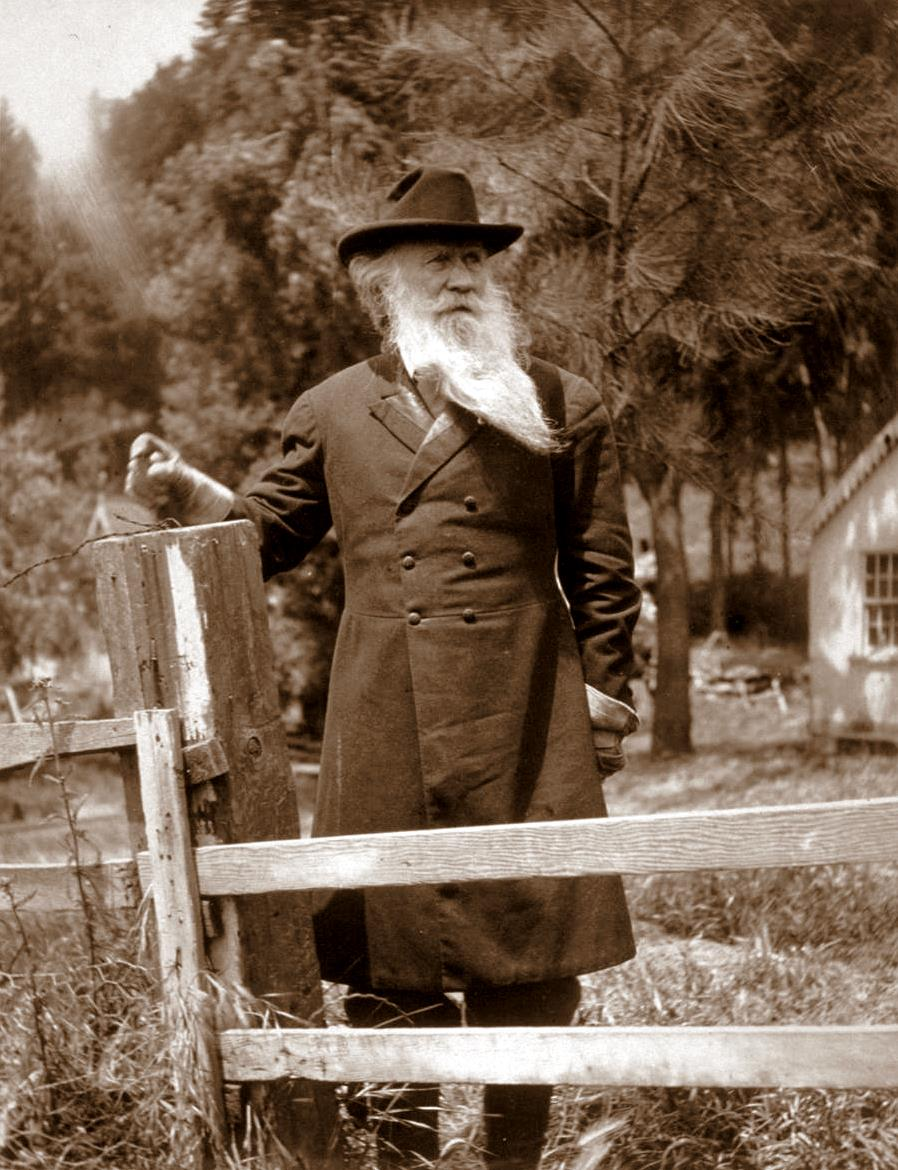
Joaquin Miller at his home

In addition to building his home here and planting hundreds of trees, Joaquin Miller placed monuments to his various heroes on the property, including Moses, John C. Frémont, and Robert Browning and Elizabeth Barrett Browning. The monuments remain to this day.

The park's 500 acres (2.0 km^{2}) are heavily wooded with coast redwoods, coast live oaks, and pines. Many of the trees were originally planted by Miller himself. The Oakland Hills location provides panoramic views of the San Francisco Bay area. The park features include miles of hiking, biking, and horseback riding trails, an off-leash dog area, a children's playground, an amphitheater, and picnic tables. The stairs below the "cascades" that flow from the Woodminister Amphitheater are actively used by fitness enthusiasts and weddings. The park is cared for by the Friends of Joaquin Miller Park coalition of users.

Flora in the park include pinkflower currant, evergreen huckleberry, creambush, and gooseberry. There are several picnic areas as well as walking trails in the park, including Sinawik Trail, Sunset Loop, Palos Colorados Trail, Chaparral Trail, and Cinderella Trail.

== Amphitheater ==
Joaquin Miller Park contains the 2,000-seat Woodminster Amphitheater and Cascade, an outdoor amphitheater regularly used to stage both amateur and professional musicals and plays. For many years the Oakland Recreation Department put on popular productions of musical comedies there, three per summer, using mostly amateur performers. Starting in 1967, production of the summer musicals was taken over by the current management.

The Cascade is the amphitheater's waterfall feature built in 1941 and dedicated to California writers, still with flowing water. It was designed by Howard Gilkey, who also designed the Cleveland Cascade at Lake Merritt (now dry).

== Volunteer Programs ==
Joaquin Miller Park has many volunteer programs that keep it running. One such organization, Friends of Joaquin Miller Park (FOJMP), works constantly with the California Department of Forestry and Fire Protection to prevent fires from destroying both the park and nearby residences. Other volunteer organizations, like the Oakland Bike Patrol, also help maintain the park.
