= Christopher Bursk =

American poet

Christopher Bursk (1943 – June 21, 2021) was an American poet, professor and activist. He is the author of nine poetry collections, including The First Inhabitants of Arcadia published by the (University of Arkansas Press (2006)), praised by The New York Times which said, "Bursk writes with verve and insight about child rearing, aging parents, sexuality, his literary heroes, the sexuality of his literary heroes."

== Life ==
Bursk was born in Cambridge, Massachusetts, and received a B.A. from Tufts University, an MFA from Warren Wilson College and an MA and a PhD from Boston University. He lived in Langhorne Manor, Pennsylvania, and taught at Bucks County Community College. He and his wife, Mary Ann, have three children: Christian, Norabeth, and Justin.

His poems have been published in literary journals and magazines including Paris Review, The American Poetry Review and Manhattan Review, and in anthologies including The Mysterious Life of the Heart: Writing from The Sun About Passion, Longing, and Love (Sun Publishing Company, 2009), and Three new poets: Christopher Bursk, William Corbett, Paul Hannigan (Pym-Randall Press, 1966).

== Awards ==
Bursk's literary honors include fellowships from the National Endowment for the Arts, Pennsylvania Council on the Arts, 1995 Pew Foundation and Guggenheim Foundation. His awards include the Capricorn Poetry Award, the Green Rose Prize, Milton Kessler Poetry Book Award, the 49th Parallel Poetry Award and the Donald Hall Prize in Poetry. His humanitarian honors include the Bucks County Citizen of the Year award from Bucks County Community College, and the Bucks County Humanitarian of the Year award. His humanitarian activities have included working as a probation counselor, volunteering in a shelter for abused women and teaching poetry to prisoners at Bucks County Prison. He has been an advocate for the homeless and an organizer for farm workers’ rights.

== Published works ==
Full-length poetry collections

- "Dear Terror" (Read Furiously, 2020)
- "A Car Stops and a Door Opens" (CavanKerry Press, 2017)
- "Unthrifty Loveliness" (WordTech Communications, 2014)
- "Selected Poems" (FutureCycle Press, 2014)
- The First Inhabitants of Arcadia (University of Arkansas Press, 2006)
- The Improbable Swervings of Atoms (University of Pittsburgh Press, 2005)
- Ovid at Fifteen (New Issues Press, 2003)
- Cell Count (Texas Tech University Press, 1997)
- "The One True Religion" (Quarterly Review of Literature, 1997)
- The Way Water Rubs Stone (Word Works, 1988)
- Places of Comfort, Places of Justice (Humanities and Arts Press, 1987)
- Place of Residence (Sparrow Press, 1983)
- Standing Watch (Houghton Mifflin, 1978)

Chapbooks

- "The Boy With One Wing" (Finishing Line Press, 2013)
- Making Wings (State Street Press, 1983)
- "Little Harbor" (Quarterly Review of Literature, 1982)

== Sources ==
- Pennsylvania Center for the Book: Biographies - Christopher Bursk
- Christopher Bursk Listing, Poets & Writers Directory
- Library of Congress Online Catalog: Christopher Bursk
