= Sarah Gambito =

American poet and professor

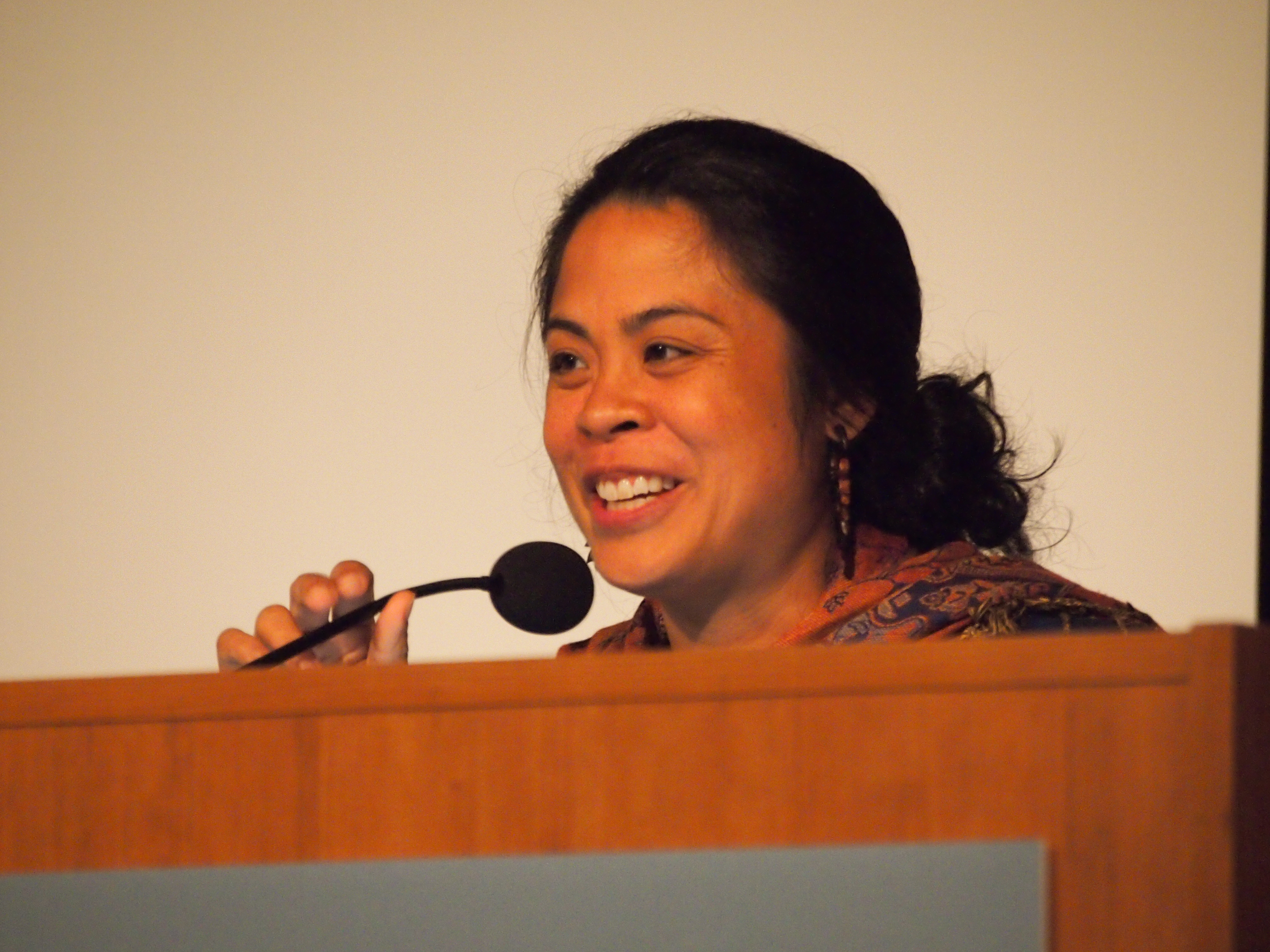
Sarah Gambito

Sarah Gambito is an American poet and professor. She is the author of three collections of poetry, Loves You (Persea Books, 2019), Delivered (Persea Books, 2009), and Matadora (Alice James Books, 2004). Her first collection, Matadora (Alice James Books, 2004), was a New England/New York Award winner and won the 2005 Global Filipino Literary Award for Poetry.

== Career ==
Gambito earned her B.A. from the University of Virginia and her M.F.A. from Brown University.

She is an assistant professor of English and director of creative writing at Fordham University. She is also co-founder, with Joseph Legaspi, of Kundiman (nonprofit organization), which serves emerging Asian American poets, and she lives in New York City.

Gambito's poems have been published in literary journals and magazines including The Iowa Review, The Antioch Review, The New Republic, Quarterly West, Fence, and in anthologies including From the Fishouse (Persea Books, 2009).

== Awards ==
Gambito's honors include a Barnes & Noble Writers for Writers Award from Poets & Writers, and grants and fellowships from the New York Foundation for the Arts, Urban Artists Initiative, and a MacDowell Colony Fellowship.

== Works ==
- Matadora, Alice James Books, 2004 ISBN 978-1882295487
- Delivered: Poems, Persea, 2009 ISBN 978-0892553464
- Loves You: Poems, Persea, 2019, ISBN 978-0892554959
