= Word Works =

American literary organization and publisher

The current logo of The Word Works

The Word Works is a literary organization based in Washington, DC. Founded in 1974, it has published works by Frannie Lindsay, Fred Marchant, Jay Rogoff, Grace Cavalieri, Donna Denizé, Christopher Bursk, and Enid Shomer and is a member of the Community of Literary Magazines and Presses. The Word Works features contemporary poetry and literature, often written by emerging poets. The Word Works titles have been reviewed by Publishers Weekly, The Rumpus, The Common, Lambda Literary, Kirkus, and other venues; and distributed by Small Press Distribution, Ingram Content Group, Baker & Taylor.

== History ==
Founded as a volunteer-staffed non-profit organization, The Word Works was originally funded through frequent grants received from the National Endowment for the Arts. These grants were supplemented through private donations and revenue from book sales. Word Works has also received grants from the DC Commission on the Arts and Humanities, the Witter Bynner Foundation, the Maryland Council on the Arts, the Virginia Commission on the Arts, the Batir Foundation, Bell Atlantic, the David G Taft Foundation, and Poets & Writers (NY).

Since 1981, the press has overseen an annual literary competition awarding the $1,500 Washington Prize for a winning poetry manuscript. The organization has also hosted the longest-running literary series in the Washington area through its Joaquin Miller Cabin series at the Joaquin Miller Cabin in Rock Creek Park. The Joaquin Miller Poetry Series ceased programming as of June 2022. The Word Works has several book imprints, including the Washington Prize, the Hilary Tham Capital Collection, the Tenth Gate Prize, and International Editions. It also accepts poetry manuscripts during an annual open reading period.

== Other Projects ==
In addition to publishing poetry books, the organization has launched other projects regularly. In the early 1980s, the Word Works sponsored an oral history project that recorded the development of the African-American intellectual and professional community in Washington, D.C., between the 1922 dedication of the Lincoln Memorial and the 1963 “I Have a Dream” speech by Martin Luther King, Jr. The program, conceived and led by Betty Parry, culminated in a symposium at the Folger Shakespeare Library, “In the Shadow of the Capitol,” presenting the principals of that era (e.g., Sterling Brown and May Miller) to a new generation of Washingtonians. Those sessions are still available to hear at the D.C. Digital Museum. From 1996 to 2003, the organization held arts retreats in Tuscany, Italy. In 2005, in collaboration with Grace Episcopal Church of Georgetown, D.C., The Word Works sponsored Poetry on Stage, presenting a taste of the oral tradition from medieval bards to modern blues, jazz, and rap, through the poetry of Allen Ginsberg, Sterling Brown, Langston Hughes, and others. The eight-week course included writing new work and practicing effective stage delivery.

Collaborations have also been part of its history, such as Kim Roberts’ The Spoken Word and the “Splendid Wake” Reading Series.

The organization's archives are housed at the Special Collections Research Center in the Estelle and Melvin Gelman Library at The George Washington University.
