= Joseph O. Legaspi =

American poet

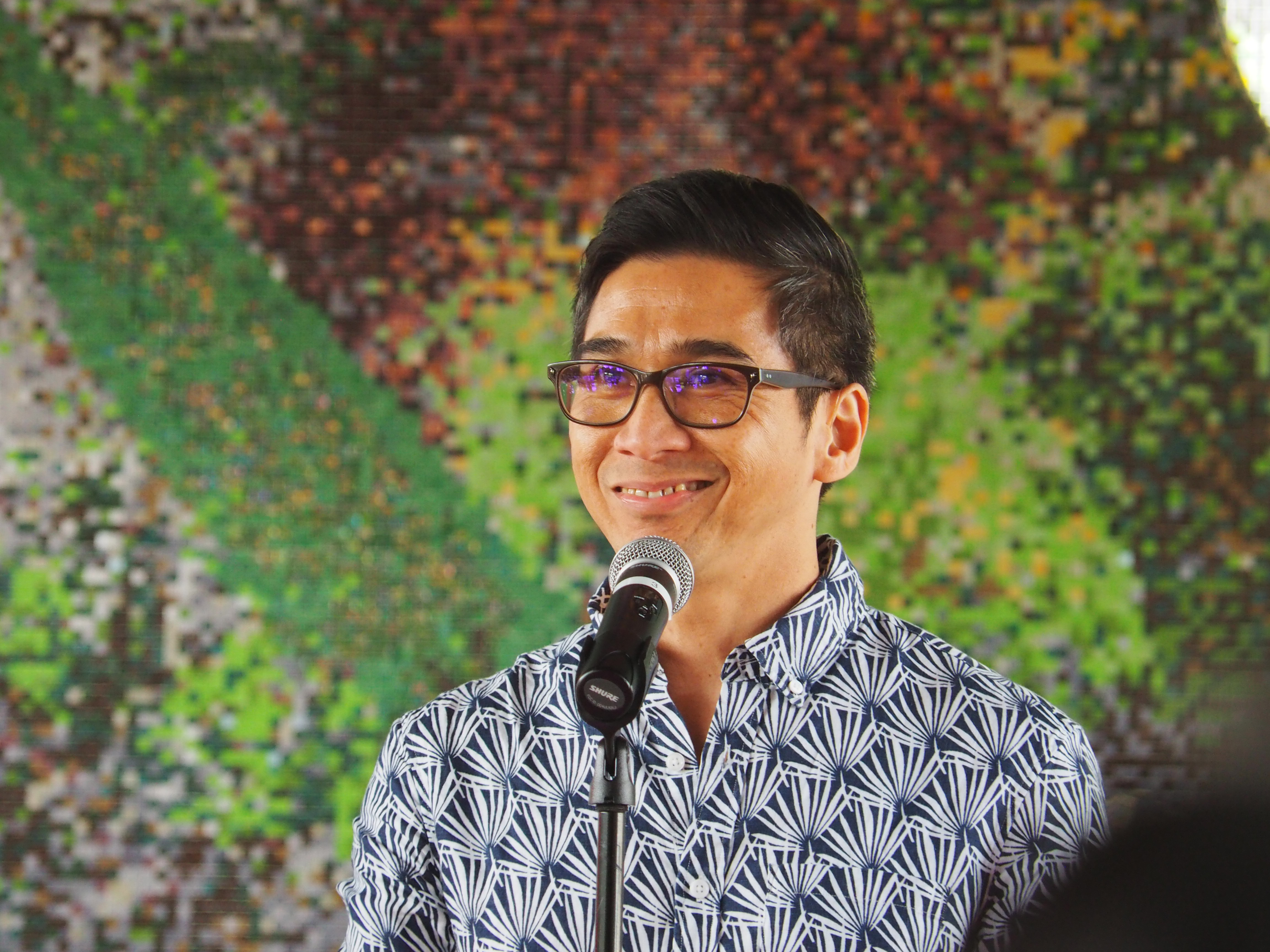
- Genre: poetry
- Notable works: "Ode to My Mother's Hair"; "Somebody"; "The Three Sparrows"

Joseph O. Legaspi is an American poet. He is the author of two full length poetry collections and two full-length poetry chapbooks.

With the poet Sarah Gambito, he cofounded Kundiman, a national nonprofit organization that nurtures generations of writers and readers of Asian American literature.

He is a juror of the Neustadt International Prize for Literature.

== Early life and education ==
Joseph O. Legaspi earned a bachelor of arts degree from Loyola Marymount University and a master's in fine arts from New York University.

== Career ==
Joseph O. Legaspi received a poetry fellowship from the New York Foundation for the Arts. His poem "Ode to My Mother's Hair" was anthologized in Language for a New Century (W.W. Norton). In 2016, his poem "Somebody" appeared in Poem-A-Day from the Academy of American Poets.

In April 2019, Orion Magazine chose Legaspi's poem "The Three Sparrows" as one of its top seven works for National Poetry Month.

Legaspi lives and works in New York City, where he serves on the faculty of Fordham University's Creative Writing Program.

== Early life and education ==
Joseph O. Legaspi was born and raised in the Philippines; his family immigrated to Los Angeles when he was 12. He earned a BA at Loyola Marymount University and an MFA from New York University.

== Works ==
- Imago, Cavankerry Press 2007. ISBN 9781933880037, OCLC 255857086
- Subways (Thrush Press 2013)
- Aviary Bestiary, Detroit, MI : Organic Weapon Arts, 2014. ISBN 9780982710661, OCLC 872420272
- Threshold, Cavankerry Press 2017. ISBN 9781933880631, OCLC 1026723165
- Postcards, Massapequa, NY : Ghostbird Press, 2019. OCLC 1102059623

== Awards ==
- Global Filipino Literary Award
