= Baron Wormser =

American poet (1948–2025)

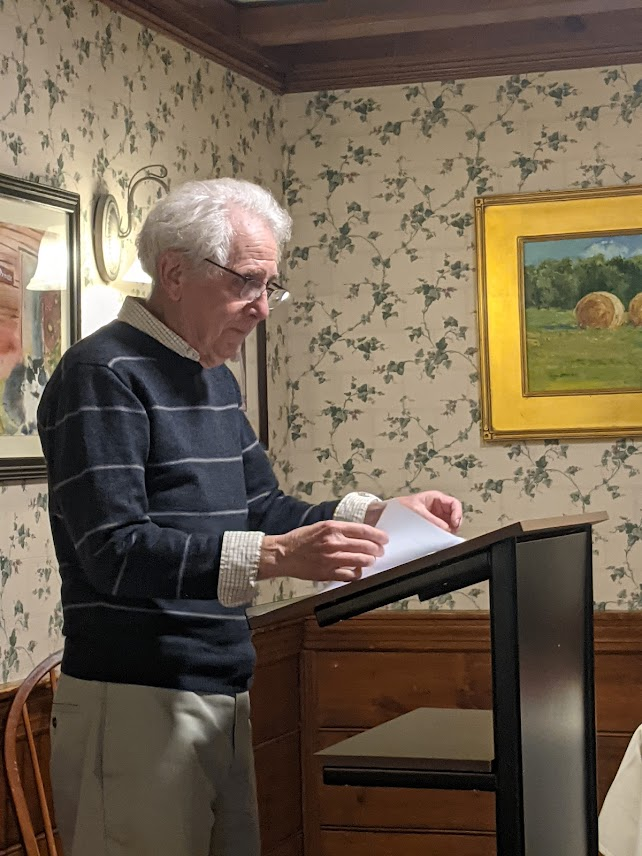
- Wormser in 2021
- Born: February 4, 1948; Baltimore, Maryland, U.S.
- Died: October 7, 2025 (aged 77); Montpelier, Vermont, U.S.
- Education: Johns Hopkins University
- Occupations: Poet, essayist, novelist, critic, educator
- Writing career
- Notable works: Impenitent Notes, Carthage
- Notable awards: Frederick Bock Prize from Poetry, Kathryn A. Morton Prize, Bread Loaf fellowship, National Endowment for the Arts fellowship, Guggenheim Fellowship
- Website: baronwormser.com

Baron Wormser (February 4, 1948 – October 7, 2025) was an American poet from Baltimore, Maryland.

== Early life and career ==
Baron Wormser was born in Baltimore on February 4, 1948. He earned his BA from Johns Hopkins University, and later completed graduate studies at the University of California-Irvine and University of Maine. Wormser served as librarian for 25 years in Madison, Maine.

Wormser served as Poet Laureate of Maine from 2000 to 2006. In 2000, he was a writer in residence at the University of South Dakota. From 2002, he taught in the Stonecoast MFA program at the University of Maine-Farmington, and from 2009, Fairfield University.

He founded the Frost Place Conference on Poetry and Teaching at The Frost Place in Franconia, New Hampshire and was later director of educational outreach at the Frost Place.

Garrison Keillor has read Wormser's poems on The Writer's Almanac.

== Personal life and death ==
Wormser lived in Cabot and spent his final years in Montpelier, Vermont, with his wife, Janet. He died there on October 7, 2025, at the age of 77.

== Awards ==
- Frederick Bock Prize from Poetry
- Kathryn A. Morton Prize
- Bread Loaf fellowship
- National Endowment for the Arts fellowship
- 1998 Guggenheim Fellowship

== Works ==
=== Poetry ===
- "The History Hotel," CavanKerry Press, 2023
- "Unidentified Sighing Objects", CavanKerry Press, 2015
- Impenitent Notes, CavanKerry Press, 2010
- Scattered Chapters: New and Selected Poems, Sarabande Books, 2008
- Carthage Illuminated Sea Press, 2005
- Subject Matter Sarabande Books, 2004
- Mulroney and Others Sarabande Books, 2000
- When Sarabande Books, 1997
- Atoms, Soul Music and Other Poems Paris Review Editions, 1989
- Good Trembling, Houghton Mifflin, 1985
- The White Words Houghton Mifflin, 1983

=== Prose ===
- Some Months in 1968, a novel, Woodhall Press, 2022
- Songs from a Voice: Being the Recollections, Stanzas, and Observations of Abe Runyan, Song Writer and Performer, Woodhall Press, 2019
- Legends of the Slow Explosion: Eleven Modern Lives, Tupelo Press, 2018
- Tom o'Vietnam: A Novel, New Rivers Press, 2017
- Teach Us That Peace, Piscataqua Press, 2013
- The Poetry Life: Ten Stories CavanKerry Press, 2008
- The Road Washes Out in Spring: A Poet's Memoir of Living Off the Grid, UPNE, 2006
- A Surge of Language: Teaching Poetry Day by Day, co-author David Cappella, Heinemann, 2004
- Teaching the Art of Poetry: The Moves, co-author David Cappella, Lawrence Erlbaum Associates, 2000
