= James Laughlin Award =

The James Laughlin Award, formerly the Lamont Poetry Prize, is given annually for a poet's second published book; it is the only major poetry award that honors a second book. The award is given by the Academy of American Poets, and is noted as one of the major prizes awarded to younger poets in the United States. It is currently named after James Laughlin, an American poet and editor who founded New Directions Publishing, the distributor of English-translated Siddhartha. In 1959, Harvey Shapiro referred to the award as "roughly, a Pulitzer for bardlings."

== Laughlin Award Winners (1996–present) ==
This partial listing is taken from the website of the Academy of American Poets.

Year	Poet	Book	Judges
2022	Annelyse Gelman	Vexations	Solmaz Sharif, Aracelis Girmay
2021	James Cagney	Martian	Aimee Nezhukumatathil, Mark Bibbins, Ladan Osman
2020	Chet'la Sebree	Field Study	Rick Barot, Gabrielle Calvocoressi, Honorée Fanonne Jeffers
2019	Aditi Machado	Emporium	Gillian Conoley, Fady Joudah, Cole Swensen
2018	Geffrey Davis	Night Angler	Patricia Spears Jones, Craig Santos Perez, Prageeta Sharma
2017	sam sax	Bury It	Tyehimba Jess, Ruth Ellen Kocher, Jill McDonough
2016	Mary Hickman	Rayfish	Ellen Bass, Jericho Brown, Carmen Giménez Smith
2015	Kathryn Nuernberger	The End of Pink	Francisco X. Alarcón, Aimee Nezhukumatathil, D. Nurske
2014	Brian Blanchfield	A Several World	Lee Ann Brown, Tina Chang, C. S. Giscombe
2013	Jillian Weise	The Book of Goodbyes	Jeffrey McDaniel, Brenda Shaughnessy, Susan Wheeler
2012	Catherine Barnett	The Game of Boxes	April Bernard, Cyrus Cassells, Dana Levin (poet)
2011	Anna Moschovakis	You and Three Others Are Approaching a Lake	Juliana Spahr, Brian Teare, Mónica de la Torre
2010	Michael Dickman	Flies	Laure-Anne Bosselaar, Major Jackson, Michael Ryan
2009	Jennifer K. Sweeney	How to Live on Bread and Music	Robin Becker, Bob Hicok, Afaa M. Weaver
2008	Rusty Morrison	the true keeps calm biding its story	Rae Armantrout, Claudia Rankine, Bruce Smith
2007	Brenda Shaughnessy	Human Dark with Sugar	Peter Gizzi, Matthea Harvey, Caroline Knox
2006	Tracy K. Smith	Duende	Elizabeth Alexander, Kimiko Hahn, Terrance Hayes
2005	Barbara Jane Reyes	Poeta en San Francisco	James Longenbach, Susan Stewart, Elizabeth Alexander
2004	Jeff Clark	Music and Suicide	Elizabeth Alexander, Mary Jo Bang, Susan Stewart
2003	Vijay Seshadri	The Long Meadow	Mary Jo Bang, Thom Gunn, Campbell McGrath
2002	Karen Volkman	Spar	Mary Jo Bang, Daniel Hall, Campbell McGrath
2001	Peter Johnson	Miracles & Mortifications	Daniel Hall, Campbell McGrath, Marilyn Nelson
2000	Liz Waldner	A Point Is That Which Has No Part	Agha Shahid Ali, Lynn Emanuel, Marilyn Nelson
1999	Tory Dent	HIV, Mon Amour	Lynn Emanuel, Yusef Komunyakaa, Marilyn Nelson
1998	Sandra Alcosser	Except by Nature	Lynn Emanuel, Yusef Komunyakaa, David St. John
1997	Tony Hoagland	Donkey Gospel	Yusef Komunyakaa, Heather McHugh, William Matthews
1996	David Rivard	Wise Poison	Heather McHugh, William Matthews, David St. John

== Lamont Poetry Selections (1975–1995) ==
Year	Poet	Book	Judges
1995	Ralph Angel	Neither World	Richard Kenney, Heather McHugh, David St. John
1994	Brigit Pegeen Kelly	Song	Jorie Graham, Richard Kenney, David St. John
1993	Rosanna Warren	Stained Glass	Amy Clampitt, Jorie Graham, Richard Kenney
1992	Kathryn Stripling Byer	Wildwood Flower	Lucille Clifton, Jorie Graham, Robert Morgan
1991	Susan Wood	Campo Santo	Marvin Bell, Lucille Clifton, Robert Morgan
1990	Li-Young Lee	The City in Which I Love You	Marvin Bell, Sandra McPherson, Robert Morgan
1989	Minnie Bruce Pratt	Crime Against Nature	Marvin Bell, Alfred Corn, Sandra McPherson
1988	Mary Jo Salter	Unfinished Painting	Alfred Corn, Sandra McPherson, Mary Oliver
1987	Garrett Hongo	The River of Heaven	Philip Booth, Alfred Corn, Mary Oliver
1986	Jane Shore	The Minute Hand	Philip Booth, Louise Glück, Mary Oliver
1985	Cornelius Eady	Victims of the Latest Dance Craze	Philip Booth, Louise Glück, Charles Simic
1984	Philip Schultz	Deep Within the Ravine	Louise Glück, Charles Simic, David Wagoner
1983	Sharon Olds	The Dead and the Living	June Jordan, Charles Simic, David Wagoner
1982	Margaret Gibson	Long Walks in the Afternoon	June Jordan, Richard Shelton, David Wagoner
1981	Carolyn Forché	The Country Between Us	William Harmon, June Jordan, Richard Shelton
1980	Michael Van Walleghen	More Trouble with the Obvious	William Harmon, Maxine Kumin, Richard Shelton
1979	Frederick Seidel	Sunrise	William Harmon, Maxine Kumin
1978	Ai	Killing Floor	Maxine Kumin, Philip Levine, Charles Wright
1977	Gerald Stern	Lucky Life	Alan Dugan, Philip Levine, Charles Wright
1976	Larry Levis	The Afterlife	Alan Dugan, Michael Harper, Philip Levine
1975	Lisel Mueller	The Private Life	Alan Dugan, John Haines, Michael Harper

== Lamont Poetry Selections (1954–1974) ==
For the first 20 years, a poet's first published volume was the annual Lamont Poetry Selection.

1974 John Balaban 1973 Marilyn Hacker 1972 Peter Everwine 1971 Stephen Dobyns 1970 William Harmon 1969 Marvin Bell 1968 Jane Cooper 1967 James Scully 1966 Kenneth O. Hanson 1965 Henri Coulette	1964 Adrien Stoutenburg 1963 No award 1962 Edward Field 1961 X. J. Kennedy 1960 Robert Mezey 1959 Donald Justice 1958 Ned O'Gorman 1957 Daniel Berrigan, S. J. 1956 Philip Booth 1955 Donald Hall 1954 Constance Carrier

== See also ==
- American poetry
- List of literary awards
- List of poetry awards
- List of years in poetry
- List of years in literature
