= Barn Owl Review =

American poetry magazine

- Issue 1 of the Barn Owl Review
- Editor: Mary Biddinger, Jay Robinson
- Categories: Literary magazine
- Frequency: Annual
- Publisher: Barn Owl Review
- Founded: 2007
- Country: United States
- Based in: Akron, Ohio
- Language: English
- Website: www.barnowlreview.com
- ISSN: 1935-1674
- OCLC: 754848548

Barn Owl Review is an American literary magazine based in Akron, Ohio. Barn Owl Review publishes poetry and poetry book reviews annually, debuting each issue in the spring at the AWP conference book fair.

== History ==
Mary Biddinger and Jay Robinson founded Barn Owl Review in 2007 and still serve as co-editors-in-chief. The eighth issue was released in April 2015 in Minneapolis.

== Awards and honors ==
- Arts Access Grant from the Ohio Arts Council, 2009
- Verse Daily, 2010 "The Claw" by Angela Vogel, "Between Seasons" by Rob Schlegel, "Worse Than the Bite" by Rebecca Givens Rolland, and "Too Darn Hot" by Sarah Perrier.
- Verse Daily, 2009 "How it Started" by Leslie Harrison, "Return as Black Currant" by Anna Journey, and "Clouds" by Jason Bredle.
- Verse Daily, 2008 "Proposal" by Sandra Beasley, "Scientific Method" by Adam Clay, "Driving Out to Innisfree" by Matthew Thorburn, and "Street Fight" by Wayne Miller.
