= Thomas Lynch (poet) =

American writer and undertaker (b. 1948)

- Born: 1948 (age 77–78); Detroit, Michigan, U.S.
- Occupation: Poet
- Writing career
- Genre: Poetry

Thomas Lynch (born 1948 in Detroit, Michigan) is an American poet, essayist, and undertaker.

== Early life ==
Lynch was educated by nuns and Christian Brothers at Brother Rice High School in Bloomfield Hills, Michigan. Lynch then went to university and mortuary school, from which he graduated in 1973. He took over his family's funeral home in Milford, Michigan in the 1970s, though he has since stepped back from the role. Lynch married in 1972 and divorced in 1984. He later remarried to Mary Tata in 1991. He has a daughter and three sons.

In 1970 Lynch went to Ireland for the first time, to find his family and read William Butler Yeats and James Joyce, an experience he recounts in his book Booking Passage: We Irish and Americans. He has returned many times since then, and now owns the small cottage in west County Clare that was the home of his great-great-grandfather, and which was given as a wedding gift in the 19th century. He spends a portion of each year there.

== Writing ==
Lynch's writing in his memoir Booking Passage: We Irish and Americans has been described as "slightly old-timey — wise with an almost iridescent quality". His writing frequently incorporates themes of death, life, and ancestry. His poems are often influenced by his own life, with frequent mentions of his ancestral home in County Clare.

== Recognition ==
His collection of essays, The Undertaking: Life Studies from the Dismal Trade, won the Heartland Prize for non-fiction, the American Book Award, and was a finalist for the National Book Award. It has been translated into seven languages. A second collection of essays, Bodies in Motion and at Rest, won the Great Lakes Book Award.

Lynch's work has appeared in The New Yorker, Poetry, The Paris Review, Harper's, Esquire, Newsweek, The Washington Post, The New York Times, The Los Angeles Times, The Irish Times, and The Times. His commentaries have been recorded and broadcast by BBC Radio, RTÉ and NPR. His work has been the subject of two documentary films: Learning Gravity, directed by Kathel Black for Little Bird Productions UK, aired on the BBC and RTÉ while PBS Frontline's The Undertaking, a film by Karen O'Conner and Miri Navasky, aired in October 2007 on PBS stations nationwide. It won the 2008 Emmy Award for Arts and Culture Documentary.

Lynch is the recipient of grants and awards from the National Endowment for the Arts, the Michigan Library Association, the National Book Foundation, the Arvon Foundation and the Arts Council of Ireland. He has read and lectured at universities and literary centers throughout Europe, the United Kingdom, Ireland, Australia, New Zealand and the United States. Lynch is also a regular presenter to professional conferences of funeral directors, hospice and medical ethics professionals, clergy, educators, and business leaders. He is an adjunct professor in the graduate creative writing program at the University of Michigan, Ann Arbor. He has appeared on C-SPAN, MSNBC, The Today Show, and the PBS Bill Moyers series, On Our Own Terms.

== Works ==
=== Poetry ===
- Skating with Heather Grace. Knopf. 1987.
- Grimalkin and Other Poems. Cape Poetry. 1994.
- Still Life in Milford: Poems. W. W. Norton & Company. 1999. ISBN 978-0-393-31973-6.
- Walking Papers: Poems 1999–2009. W. W. Norton & Company. 2010. ISBN 978-0-393-04208-5.
- The Sin-eater: A Breviary. Parclete Press. 2013. / Salmon Publishing (Ireland). 2012.

=== Fiction ===
- Apparition and Late Fictions. W. W. Norton & Company. 2010. ISBN 978-0-393-04207-8.

=== Non-fiction ===
- The Undertaking: Life Studies from the Dismal Trade. W. W. Norton & Company. 1997. ISBN 978-0-393-04112-5.
- Bodies in Motion and at Rest: On Metaphor and Mortality. W. W. Norton & Company. 2001. ISBN 978-0-393-32164-7.
- Booking Passage: We Irish and Americans. W. W. Norton & Company. 2006. ISBN 978-0-393-32857-8.

=== Anthologies ===
- Michael Delp; Conrad Hilberry; Herbert Scott, eds. (1988). "Like My Father Waking Early". Contemporary Michigan poetry: poems from the third coast. Wayne State University Press. ISBN 978-0-8143-1924-6.
- Michael Delp; Conrad Hilberry; Josie Kearns, eds. (2000). "An Evening Walk to the Sea by Friesians". New poems from the third coast: contemporary Michigan poetry. Wayne State University Press. ISBN 978-0-8143-2797-5.
