= New Issues Poetry & Prose =

Literary publisher in Kalamazoo, Michigan

- Parent company: Western Michigan University
- Founded: 1996
- Founder: Herbert S. Scott
- Country of origin: United States
- Headquarters location: Kalamazoo, Michigan
- Distribution: University of Chicago Press
- Publication types: books

New Issues Poetry & Prose was a literary press specializing in poetry and literary fiction. Founded in 1996, the press closed submissions in 2021.

== History ==
New Issues was founded by poet and Western Michigan University professor Herbert S. Scott, and run with support from the university. Editors have included poets William Olsen and Nancy Eimers.

The Huffington Post called New Issues Press one of fifteen small presses in the United States that "exemplify the best qualities of [the American] publishing tradition." After a two-week vote, Huffington Post readers named New Issues number one in the country among the fifteen small presses cited.

The press awarded two poetry prizes each year, The New Issues Poetry Prize for a first book of poetry, and The Green Rose Prize for established poets.

The press has also published a number of prominent Michigan poets through its Inland Seas Poetry Series, including Jim Daniels, David Dodd Lee, Anthony Butts, Lee Upton, John Rybicki, and Mary Ann Samyn.

Other notable poets published by New Issues include Michael Burkard, Khaled Mattawa, Claudia Keelan, Lisa Lewis, Brian Henry, Jericho Brown, Sarah Messer, Ruth Ellen Kocher, Donald Platt, Rebecca Reynolds, Martha Serpas, Gladys Cardiff, Stacie Cassarino, and Patricia Jabbeh Wesley.

From 2004-2021 the press published the winning novels in the AWP Award Series in the Novel.

All New Issues titles were designed through The Design Center by senior graphic design students in the Frostic School of Art at Western Michigan University, under the supervision of Art Director, Nick Kuder and Production Manager, Paul Sizer.

== The New Issues Poetry Prize ==
- 2020 - James Henry Knippen, Would We Still Be (Judge: Traci Brimhall)
- 2019 - Daniel M. Becker, 2nd Chance (Judge: Jericho Brown)
- 2018 - Chet'la Sebree, Mistress (Judge: Cathy Park Hong)
- 2017 - Nina Puro, Each Tree Could Hold a Noose or a House (Judge: David Rivard)
- 2016 - Courtney Kampa, Our Lady of Not Asking Why (Judge: Mary Szybist)
- 2015 - Sawnie Morris, Her, Infinite (Judge: Major Jackson)
- 2014 - Abdul Ali, Trouble Sleeping (Judge: Fanny Howe)
- 2013 - Kerrin McCadden, Landscape with Plywood Silhouette (Judge: David St. John)
- 2012 - Marni Ludwig, Pinwheel (Judge: Jean Valentine)
- 2011 - Andrew Allport, the body | of space | in the shape of the human (Judge: David Wojahn)
- 2010 - Jeff Hoffman, Journal of American Foreign Policy (Judge: Linda Gregerson)
- 2009 - Judy Halebsky, Sky=Empty (Judge: Marvin Bell)
- 2008 - Justin Marks, A Million in Prizes (Judge: Carl Phillips)
- 2007 - Sandra Beasley, Theories of Falling (Judge: Marie Howe)
- 2006 - Jason Bredle, Standing in Line for the Beast (Judge: Barbara Hamby
- 2005 - Katie Peterson, This One Tree (Judge: William Olsen)
- 2004 - Kevin Boyle, A Home for Wayward Girls (Judge: Rodney Jones)
- 2003 - Cynie Cory, Bradley Paul, Barbara Maloutas, Louise Mathias, Ever Saskya, Heidi Lynn Staples, and Matthew Thorburn (Judge: Brenda Hillman)
- 2002 - Paul Guest, The Resurrection of the Body and the Ruin of the World (Judge: Campbell McGrath)
- 2001 - Sarah Mangold, Household Mechanics (Judge: C.D. Wright)
- 2000 - Elizabeth Powell, The Republic of Self (Judge: C.K. Williams)
- 1999 - Joy Manesiotis, They Sing to Her Bones (Judge: Philip Levine)
- 1998 - Malena Mörling, Ocean Avenue (Judge: Philip Levine)
- 1997 - Marsha de la O, Black Hope (Judge: Chase Twichell)

== The Green Rose Prize ==
- 2019 - Sarah Gridley, Insofar
- 2018 - Lauren K. Alleyne, Honeyfish
- 2017 - Doreen Gildroy, Trilogy
- 2016 - Nadine Sabra Meyer, Chrysanthemum, Chrysanthemum
- 2015 - Bruce Cohen, Imminent Disappearances, Impossible Numbers & Panoramic X-Rays
- 2014 - Kathleen Halme, My Multiverse
- 2013 - Ralph Angel, Your Moon
- 2012 - Jaswinder Bolina, Phantom Camera
- 2011 - Corey Marks, The Radio Tree
- 2010 - Seth Abramson, Northerners
- 2009 - Malinda Markham, Having Cut the Sparrow's Heart
- 2008 - Patty Seyburn, Hilarity
- 2007 - Jon Pineda, The Translator's Diary
- 2006 - Noah Eli Gordon, A Fiddle Pulled from the Throat of a Sparrow
- 2005 - Joan Houlihan, The Mending Worm
- 2004 - Hugh Seidman, Somebody Stand Up and Sing
- 2003 - Christine Hume, Alaskaphrenia ; Gretchen Mattox, Buddha Box
- 2002 - Christopher Bursk, Ovid at Fifteen
