= David Gewanter =

American poet

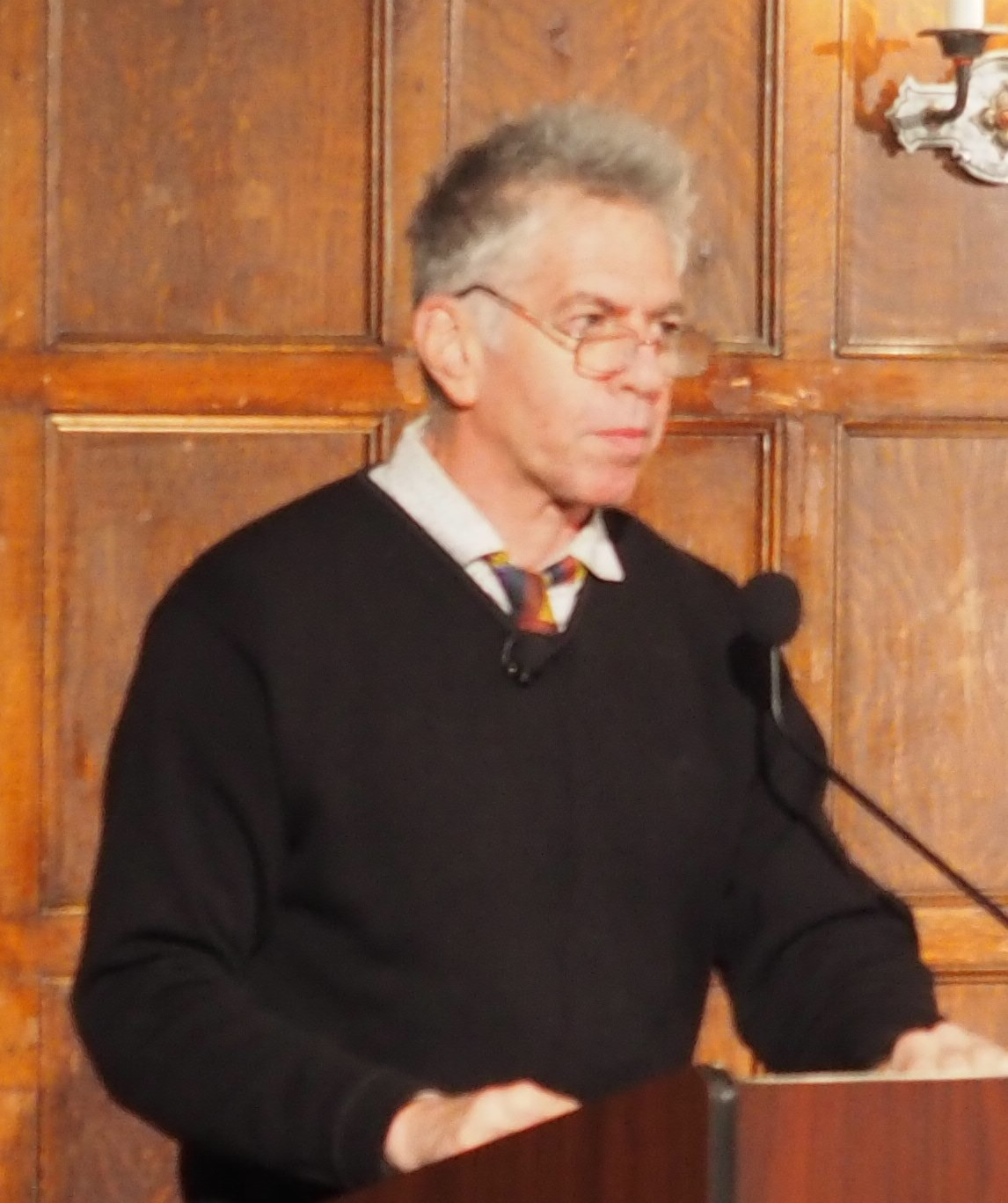
- David Gewanter, is an American poet
- Writing career
- Genre: Poetry

David Gewanter is an American poet.

== Life ==
He teaches at Georgetown University, and lives in Washington, D. C., with his wife, writer Joy Young Gewanter, and son James.

His work has appeared in Ploughshares.

== Awards ==
- 1980: Hopwood Award, University of Michigan
- 1989: Eisner Prize, University of California, Berkeley
- 1990: Academy of American Poets Prize, University of California, Berkeley
- 1994: Levinson Award, Harvard University
- 1998: John C. Zacharis First Book Award for In the Belly
- 1999: Witter Bynner Fellowship, Library of Congress
- 2002: Whiting Award
- 2003: James Laughlin Award - finalist for The Sleep of Reason
- 2004: Ambassador Book Award for Robert Lowell: Collected Poems
- 2004: Book of the Year for Robert Lowell: Collected Poems

== Works ==
- "GAG"; "ENGLISH 1"; "SEE SAW"; "CONVULVOLUS, A LULLABY"; "CONDUCT OF OUR LOVES", Beltway Poetry Quarterly
- "Against the Grain", Slate
- "Traffic of Creations", Slate, July 23, 2002
- "Boy's Poem". Boston Review. Archived from the original on May 13, 2008.
- In the Belly. University of Chicago Press. 1997. ISBN 978-0-226-28873-4. "David Gewanter."
- The Sleep of Reason. University of Chicago Press. Fall 2003. ISBN 978-0-226-28973-1.
- War Bird. University of Chicago Press. 2009. ISBN 9780226289786.

=== Editor ===
- Robert Lowell (2003). Frank Bidart; David Gewanter (eds.). Collected Poems. Farrar, Straus and Giroux. ISBN 978-0-374-12617-9.

=== Anthology ===
- Sarah Browning; Michele Elliott; Danny Rose, eds. (2003). DC Poets Against the War: An Anthology. The Argonne House Press. ISBN 978-1-887641-99-9.

=== Ploughshares ===
- "Conduct of Our Loves". Ploughshares. Winter 1992–1993. Archived from the original on 2002-07-19.
- "In the Belly". Ploughshares. Winter 1992–1993. Archived from the original on 2002-07-19.

== Essay ==
- "Essay: The Problem of Originality", Smartish Pace
