= Witter Bynner Fellowship =

Witter Bynner Fellowships are administered by the Library of Congress and sponsored by the Witter Bynner Foundation for Poetry, an organization that provides grant support for poetry programs through nonprofit organizations. Fellows are chosen by the U.S. Poet Laureate, and are expected to participate in a poetry reading at the Library of Congress in October and to organize a poetry reading in their respective cities.

== List of Fellows ==
- 2017 — Ray Gonzalez
- 2016 — Allison Adelle Hedge Coke
- 2015 — Emily Fragos and Bobby C. Rogers
- 2014 — Honorée Fanonne Jeffers, and Jake Adam York (posthumous)
- 2013 — Sharon Dolin and Shara McCallum
- 2012 — L. S. Asekoff and Sheila Black
- 2011 — Forrest Gander and Robert Bringhurst
- 2010 — Jill McDonough and Atsuro Riley
- 2009 — Christina Davis and Mary Szybist
- 2008 — Matthew Thorburn and Monica Youn
- 2007 — Laurie Lamon and David Tucker
- 2006 — Joseph Stroud and Connie Wanek
- 2005 — Claudia Emerson and Martin Walls
- 2004 — Dana Levin and Spencer Reece
- 2003 — Major Jackson and Rebecca Wee
- 2002 — George Bilgere and Katia Kapovich
- 2001 — Tory Dent and Nick Flynn
- 2000 — Naomi Shihab Nye and Joshua Weiner
- 1999 — David Gewanter, Heather McHugh, and Campbell McGrath
- 1998 — Carl Phillips and Carol Muske-Dukes

== See also ==
- Witter Bynner Poetry Prize
- American poetry
- List of poetry awards
- List of literary awards
- List of years in poetry
- List of years in literature
