= Anthony Butts =

American poet (born 1969)

Anthony Butts (born July 28, 1969, in Detroit, Michigan) is an American poet.

== Life ==
He graduated from Wayne State University with a bachelor's degree, from Western Michigan University, with an MFA, and University of Missouri with a PhD.

He taught at the University of Dayton, as well as Carnegie Mellon University. He was married to journalist Leah Samuel (b. 1970) from 2004 to 2009.

== Award ==
- 2004 William Carlos Williams Award

== Works ==
- "The Nut Gatherers", Poetry Society of American
- The Golden Underground. Wayne State University Press. 2009. ISBN 978-0-8143-3389-1.
- Little Low Heaven. New Issues/Western Michigan University. 2003. ISBN 978-1-930974-26-5.
- The Next Generation (CMU Press, 2000)
- Evolution. Sutton Hoo Press. 1998.
- Fifth Season. New Issues Press, Western Michigan University. 1997. ISBN 978-0-932826-53-4.
- "Prayer" in Lines + Stars literary journal http://www.linesandstars.com/spring-2014/anthony-butts/prayer/

=== Anthologies ===
- Ed Ochester, ed. (2007). American Poetry Now: Pitt poetry series anthology. University of Pittsburgh Press. ISBN 978-0-8229-4310-5.
- Melba Joyce Boyd; M. L. Liebler, eds. (2001). "Detroit, City of Straits". Abandon Automobile: Detroit city poetry 2001. Wayne State University Press. ISBN 978-0-8143-2810-1.
- Michael Delp; Conrad Hilberry; Josie Kearns, eds. (2000). "Angels". New Poems from the Third Coast: contemporary Michigan poetry. Wayne State University Press. ISBN 978-0-8143-2797-5.
