= Laurie Lamon =

American poet (born 1956)

Laurie Lamon (born 1956) is an American poet.

== Education ==
Lamon earned her bachelor's degree from Whitworth College (now Whitworth University) in Spokane, Washington, her master's in fine arts from the University of Montana, and her doctorate in English literature from the University of Utah in 1988.

== Career ==
Lamon is an associate professor of English at Whitworth University and teaches courses that include poetry workshop, creative writing, and contemporary American poetry.

Her poems have appeared in The New Republic, Ploughshares, The New Criterion, The Colorado Review, The Atlantic Monthly, Arts & Letters Journal of Contemporary Culture, Feminist Studies, Primavera, Poetry Northwest, and Northwest Review.

== Awards ==
- 2001 Pushcart Prize for the poem, Pain Thinks of the Beautiful Table
- 2002 Graves Award in the Humanities.
- 2007 Witter Bynner Fellow, named by U.S. poet laureate Donald Hall

== Works ==
- "Separating the flowers". The New Criterion. February 2002.
- The Fork Without Hunger. CavanKerry Press. 2005. ISBN 978-0-9723045-5-9.
- Without Wings. CavanKerry Press, Limited. 2009. ISBN 978-1-933880-12-9.

=== Anthologies ===
- Billy Collins, ed. (2005). "Praise". 180 more: extraordinary poems for every day. Random House, Inc. ISBN 978-0-8129-7296-2.
- Bill Henderson, ed. (2003). Pushcart Prize XXVII: Best of the Small Presses. Pushcart Press. ISBN 978-1-888889-35-2.

=== Ploughshares ===
- "Pain Thinks of the First Thing". Ploughshares. Fall 2001. Archived from the original on September 26, 2006.
- "You Think of the Loss of Paradise". Ploughshares. Fall 2001. Archived from the original on August 11, 2007.
- "Pain Thinks of Alcibiades". Ploughshares. Spring 2003. Archived from the original on November 4, 2007.
- "Pain Thinks of Something Biography". Ploughshares. Winter 2006–2007. Archived from the original on November 4, 2007.
- "Pain Thinks of Something Without Description". Ploughshares. Winter 2008–2009. Archived from the original on January 21, 2016.
