= Mary Jo Bang =

American poet (born 1946)

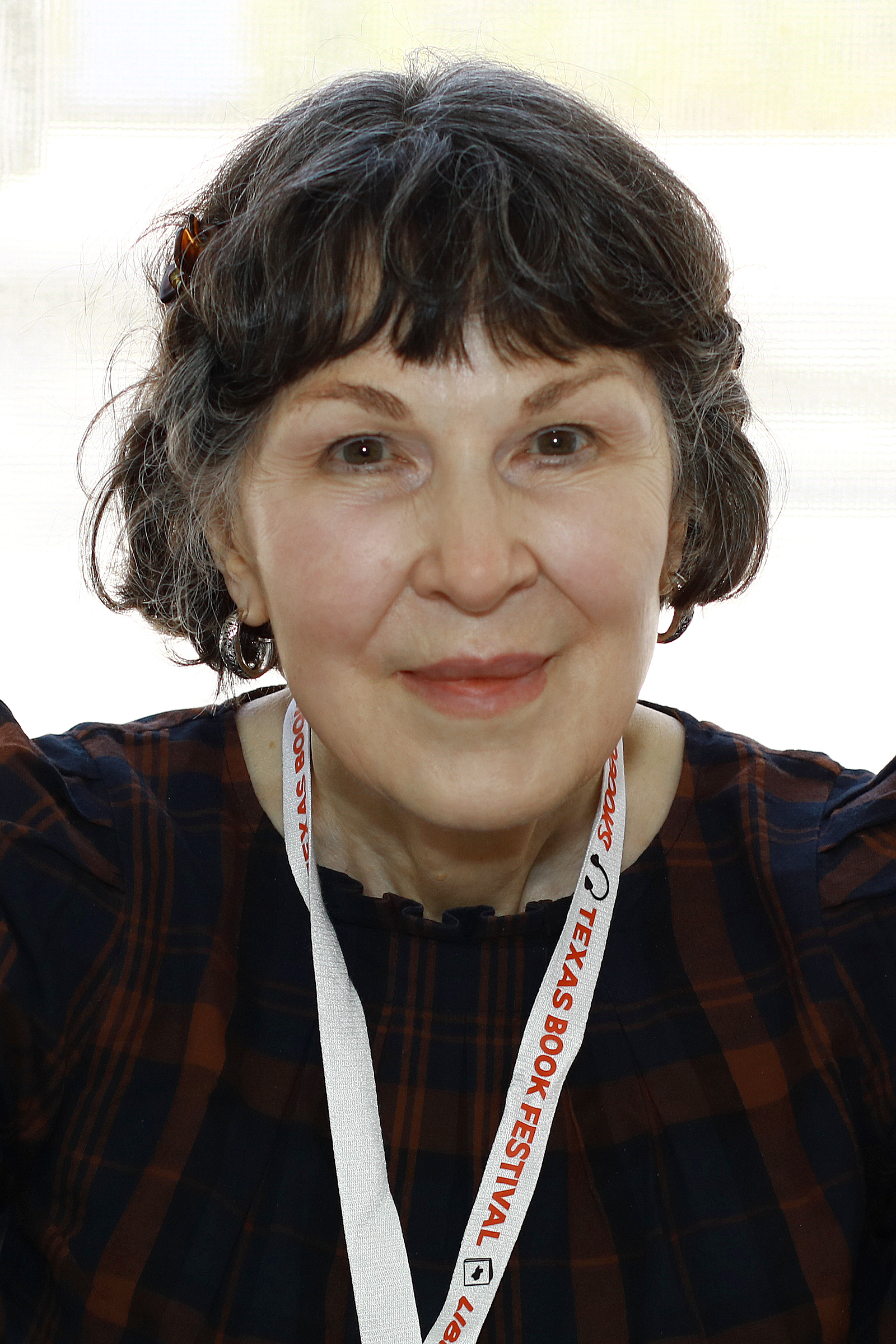
- Bang at the 2024 Texas Book Festival
- Born: October 22, 1946 (age 79); Waynesville, Missouri, USA
- Education: Northwestern University; Polytechnic of Central London; Columbia University
- Occupation: Poet

Mary Jo Bang (born October 22, 1946, in Waynesville, Missouri) is an American poet.

== Life ==
Bang grew up in Ferguson, Missouri. She graduated from Northwestern University with a Bachelor's and Master's in sociology, from the Polytechnic of Central London with a Bachelor's in Photography, and from Columbia University, with an M.F.A. in Creative Writing (Poetry). Previously, she has taught at Columbia College, Yale University, The New School for Social Research, University of Montana, Columbia University and at Iowa's Writing Workshop. Bang is currently a professor at Washington University in St. Louis.

Her work has appeared in New American Writing, Paris Review, The New Yorker, A Public Space, The New Republic, Denver Quarterly, The New York Times, The New Yorker and Harvard Review.

Bang was the poetry co-editor of the Boston Review from 1995 to 2005. She was a judge for the 2004 James Laughlin Award.

She lives in St. Louis, Missouri.

== Awards and recognitions ==
- RHINO Translation Prize (with Yuki Tanaka), 2020
- Gulf Coast Prize in Translation, 2018
- Berlin Prize Fellowship, 2015
- American Library Association Notable Book, 2013
- American Poets Notable Book, 2012
- Paumanok Poetry Award, 2010
- 100 Notable Books of 2008
- Publishers Weekly; "2007 Best Books of the Year" St. Louis Post-Dispatch; "Most Recommended" National Book
- National Book Critics Circle Award, 2007
- Washington University Faculty Research Grant, Summer 2007, Summer 2014
- Bellagio Foundation Fellowship 2007
- Finalist, Anna Akhmatova Award 2006
- Bogliosco Foundation Fellowship 2005
- Poetry Society of America's Alice Fay di Castagnola Award 2005 (Fannie Howe, Judge) & 2002 (Brenda Hillman, Judge)
- Guggenheim Fellowship 2004
- Linda Hull Award, 2004
- Pushcart Prize 2003
- "Louise in Love" listed in: "Notable Books in 2001" National Book Critics Circle; "Best Books of 2001" St. Louis Post-Dispatch
- University of Georgia’s Contemporary Poets Series Competition 2000 (Mark Strand, Judge)
- Hodder Fellowship, Princeton University 1999-2000
- Chateau Lavigny Fellowship 1999
- Great Lakes Colleges Association New Writer's Award 1998
- Yaddo Fellowship 1998
- "Apology for Want" listed in “Notable Books in 1997” by the National Book Critics Circle
- Bread Loaf Writers' Conference Fellowship, 1997
- Katharine Bakeless Nason Publication Prize 1996 (Edward Hirsh, Judge)
- MacDowell Colony Fellowship, 1996
- "Discovery" The Nation Poetry Award 1995
- Honorable Mention, Academy of American Poets Poetry Competition, 1995 (Robert Pinsky, Judge)
- Columbia University School of the Arts Dean's Award, 1994

== Bibliography ==
=== Collections ===
- Apology for want. UPNE. 1997.
- Louise in love. Grove Press. 2001.
- The downstream extremity of the Isle of the Swans. University of Georgia Press. 2001.
- The eye like a strange balloon. Grove Press. 2004.
- Allegory (2004)
- Elegy. Graywolf Press. 2007.
- The bride of E : poems. Graywolf Press. 2009.
- Let's say yes : chapbook (2011)
- Her head in a rabbit hole : chapbook (2006)
- The last two seconds : poems (2015)
- A doll for throwing : poems (2017)

In translation

- Eskapaden. Selected Poems. German/Engl. (Luxbooks, Wiesbaden 2010)

=== List of poems ===
Title	Year	First published	Reprinted/collected
The diary of a lost girl	2001	Bang, Mary Jo (2001). "The diary of a lost girl". Louise in Love. Grove Press.	
The Cruel Wheel Turns Twice	2005	Bang, Mary Jo (Winter 2005). "The Cruel Wheel Turns Twice". The Paris Review. Archived from the original on July 3, 2008.	
So, So it Begins Means it Begins	2009	Bang, Mary Jo (March 30, 2009). "So, So it Begins Means it Begins". The New Yorker.	
All Through the Night	2013	Bang, Mary Jo, Mary Jo (December 2, 2013). "All Through the Night". The New Yorker. 89 (39): 42–43.	
The head of a dancer	2017	Bang, Mary Jo (January 30, 2017). "The head of a dancer". The New Yorker. 92 (47): 53.	

=== Translations ===
- Bang, Mary Jo (2013). Inferno. Graywolf Press. ISBN 978-1555976545.
- Bang, Mary Jo (2021). Purgatorio. Graywolf Press. ISBN 978-1644450574.

=== Anthologies ===
- Heather McHugh; David Lehman, eds. (2007). "The Opening". The Best American Poetry 2007. Simon and Schuster. ISBN 978-0-7432-9972-5.
- Lyn Hejinian; David Lehman, eds. (2004). "The Eye like a Strange Balloon Mounts Towards Infinity". The Best American Poetry 2004. Simon and Schuster. ISBN 978-0-7432-5757-2.
- John Tranter; John Kinsella; Tracy Ryan, eds. (2002). "Don't Know Why There's No Sun Up in the Sky Stormy Weather". Salt an International Journal of Poetry and Poetics. Salt Publishing. ISBN 978-1-876857-47-9.
