= David Tucker (poet) =

American poet, and news editor

- Education: University of Michigan
- Occupations: Poet, news editor
- Spouse: Beth Johnson
- Children: 3

David Tucker is an American poet, and news editor.

== Life ==
He graduated from the University of Michigan, where he studied with Donald Hall.

He is an assistant managing editor of the Metro section of The Star-Ledger of Newark.

He married and had a daughter, Calisa. His second marriage was to Beth Johnson; they have two daughters, Emily, and Amy.

== Awards ==
- 2007 Witter Bynner Fellowship
- Bakeless prize from the Bread Loaf Writer’s Conference

== Works ==
- "The Dancer", Poetry Foundation
- "Today’s News", Poetry Foundation
- Late for work. Houghton Mifflin Harcourt. 2006. ISBN 978-0-618-65868-8. "David Tucker poet."
- Days When Nothing Happens. Slapering Hol Press. 2003. ISBN 978-0-9700277-3-3.
