= Corey Marks =

American poet

- Education: Kalamazoo College (BA); Warren Wilson College (MFA); University of Houston (PhD)
- Occupation: Poet

Corey Marks is an American poet.

== Biography ==
Corey Marks holds a Ph.D. in Creative Writing and Literature from the University of Houston, an MFA from the Program for Writers at Warren Wilson College, and a BA in English from Kalamazoo College. He teaches at the University of North Texas and is a judge, along with Jehanne Dubrow and Tarfia Faizullah, of the Rilke Prize.

His work appears in Antioch Review, Black Warrior Review, New England Review, Southwest Review, TriQuarterly, The Virginia Quarterly Review, Paris Review, Legitimate Dangers, and elsewhere.

== Awards ==
- 1999 National Poetry Series, for Renunciation
- 2003 National Endowment for the Arts Fellowship
- Natalie Ornish Prize from the Texas Institute for Letters
- Bernard F. Conners Prize from The Paris Review
- 2011 Green Rose Prize from New Issues Press, for "The Radio Tree"

== Poetry collections ==
- The Rock That Is Not a Rabbit. University of Pittsburgh Press. 2023. ISBN 9780822967156.
- The Radio Tree. New Issues Press. 2012. ISBN 978-1-936970-06-3.
- Renunciation. University of Illinois Press. 2000. ISBN 978-0-252-06898-0.

== Online Works ==
- "Portrait of a Child", NEA
