= Joseph Stroud =

American poet (born 1943)

- Born: 1943 (age 82–83); Glendale, California, U.S.
- Education: University of San Francisco; University of California, Los Angeles; San Francisco State University
- Occupation: Poet

Joseph Stroud (born 1943, Glendale, California) is an American poet.

== Life ==
He was educated at the University of San Francisco, California State University at Los Angeles, and San Francisco State University. He is currently retired from teaching at Cabrillo College.

He has published five collections of poetry, most recently Of This World; New and Selected Poems (Copper Canyon Press, 2008) and Country of Light (Copper Canyon Press, 2004). His work earned a Pushcart Prize in 2000 and has been featured on Garrison Keillor's Writer's Almanac. He was also a finalist for the Northern California Book Critics Award in 2005 and a year later was selected for a Witter Bynner Fellowship in poetry from the Library of Congress. His poetry articulates a voyage through places and times and voices, often sifting through the details of daily life, searching for miracles (“Inside the pear there’s a paradise we will never know, our only hint the sweetness of its taste.” - Comice, Below Cold Mountain).

He divides his time between his home in Santa Cruz, California, and a cabin in the Sierra Nevada.

== Awards ==
- 2000 Pushcart Prize
- 2005 finalist for the Northern California Book Critics Award
- 2006 Witter Bynner Fellowship in poetry from the Library of Congress.
- 2011 Arts and Letters Award in Literature from the American Academy of Arts and Letters.

== Works ==
- In the Sleep of Rivers. Capra Press. 1974. ISBN 978-0-912264-98-1.
- Signatures. BOA. 1982. ISBN 978-0-918526-38-0.
- Below Cold Mountain. Copper Canyon Press. 1998. ISBN 978-1-55659-084-9.
- Country of Light. Copper Canyon Press. 2004. ISBN 978-1-55659-205-8.
- Of This World: New and Selected Poems. Copper Canyon Press. 2008. ISBN 978-1-55659-285-0.

=== Anthologies ===
- Dana Gioia; Chryss Yost; Jack Hicks, eds. (2004). "Missing; Hear that Phone Ringing? Sounds Like Long Distance; Manna". California poetry: from the Gold Rush to the present. Heyday Books. ISBN 978-1-890771-72-0.
- Patrice Vecchione, ed. (2007). "Bible". Faith and Doubt: An Anthology of Poems. Illustrator Patrice Vecchione. Macmillan. ISBN 978-0-8050-8213-5.
