= Barbara Jane Reyes =

American poet (born 1971)

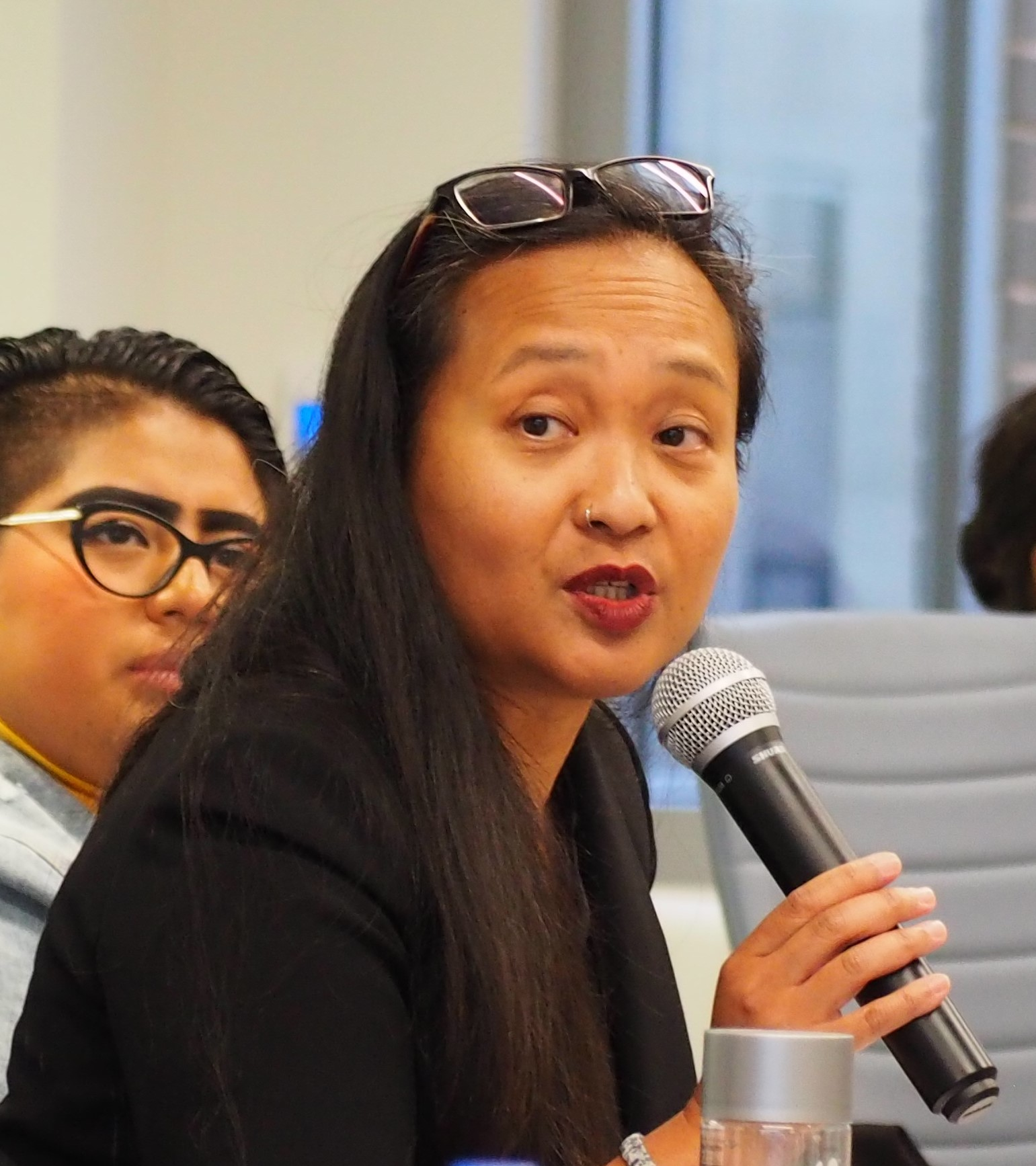
- Reyes in 2025
- Born: 1971 (age 54–55); Manila, Philippines
- Occupations: Poet, Editor, Teacher
- Spouse: Oscar Bermeo
- Writing career
- Notable works: Poeta en San Francisco, Diwata
- Notable awards: James Laughlin Award

Barbara Jane Reyes is an American poet whose work "explores the translatable and untranslatable collisions of writing, self and culture."

== Early life ==
Reyes was born in Manila, Philippines, and raised in the San Francisco Bay Area. She received her B.A. in Ethnic Studies at UC Berkeley. As an undergraduate, Reyes "served as editor in chief for maganda magazine, and witnessed the emergence of Filipino American literary figures." Reyes received her M.F.A. at San Francisco State University.

== Career ==
Reyes is the author of Gravities of Center (Arkipelago, 2003), Poeta en San Francisco (Tinfish, 2005), for which she received the James Laughlin Award of the Academy of American Poets, and Diwata (BOA Editions, Ltd., 2010).

Her work has appeared or is forthcoming in numerous publications, including 2nd Avenue Poetry, Asian Pacific American Journal, Boxcar Poetry Review, Chain, Crate, Interlope, New American Writing, Nocturnes Review, North American Review, Notre Dame Review, Parthenon West Review, as well as in the anthologies Babaylan (Aunt Lute Books, 2000), Eros Pinoy (Anvil, 2001), InvAsian: Asian Sisters Represent (Study Center Press, 2003), Going Home to a Landscape (Calyx, 2003), Coloring Book (Rattlecat, 2003), Not Home But Here (Anvil, 2003), Pinoy Poetics (Meritage, 2004), Asian Americans in the San Francisco Bay Area (Avalon Publishing, 2004), 100 Love Poems: Philippine Love Poetry Since 1905 (University of the Philippines Press, 2004), Red Light: Superheroes, Saints and Sluts (Arsenal Pulp Press, 2005), and Graphic Poetry (Victionary, 2005).

Reyes is an adjunct professor at University of San Francisco’s Yuchengco Philippine Studies Program. She has previously taught Creative Writing at Mills College, and Philippine Studies at University of San Francisco. She co-edits Doveglion Press, a publisher of political literature, with her husband poet Oscar Bermeo. Reyes currently resides in Oakland, California.

== Published works ==
Full-length poetry collections

- Gravities of Center (Arkipelago Books, 2003).
- Poeta en San Francisco (Tinfish Press, 2005).
- Diwata (BOA Editions, Ltd., 2010).
- To Love as Aswang: songs, fragments and found objects (Philippine American Writers and Artists, Inc., 2015).
- Invocation to Daughters (City Lights Publishers, 2017).
- Letters to a Young Brown Girl (BOA Editions Ltd., 2020).

Full-length literary nonfiction

- Wanna Peek into My Notebook? Notes on Pinay Liminality (Paloma Press, 2022).

Chapbooks

- Easter Sunday (Ypolita Press, 2008).
- Cherry (Portable Press at Yo-Yo Labs, 2008).
- West Oakland Sutra for the AK-47 Shooter at 3:00 AM and other Oakland poems (Deep Oakland Editions, 2008).

Poems online

- “Estuary,” “Cherry,” “Pink.” Octopus Magazine, Issue 8.
- “[galleon prayer],” “[a compendium of angels],” “[diwata taga ilog at dagat].” HOW2, 2006.
- "The Night Manny Pacquiao KO’ed Oscar De La Hoya." The Rumpus, 2009.
- "One Question, Several Answers." Kartika Review, Spring 2010.
