= The Tradition (poetry collection) =

2019 poetry collection by Jericho Brown

- L. Ralphi Burgess, You're in the Middle of the World, ca. 2017, acrylic and mixed media, 18" × 25"
- Author: Jericho Brown
- Audio read by: JD Jackson
- Cover artist: Lauren Ralphi Burgess
- Language: English
- Genre: Poetry
- Publisher: Copper Canyon Press
- Publication date: April 2, 2019
- Publication place: United States
- Media type: Print (paperback and hardcover), e-book
- Pages: 110 (paperback)
- Awards: Pulitzer Prize for Poetry (2020)
- ISBN: 978-1-55659-486-1 (paperback)
- OCLC: 1113894902
- Dewey Decimal: 811/.6
- LC Class: PS3602.R699 A6 2019
- Preceded by: The New Testament

The Tradition is a 2019 poetry collection by American poet Jericho Brown.

The collection won the 2020 Pulitzer Prize for Poetry. Judges of the prize called the book "a collection of masterful lyrics that combine delicacy with historical urgency in their loving evocation of bodies vulnerable to hostility and violence."

== Contents ==
I

- "Ganymede"
- "As a Human Being"
- "Flower"
- "The Microscopes"
- "The Tradition"
- "Hero"
- "After Another Country"
- "The Water Lilies"
- "Foreday in the Morning"
- "The Card Tables"
- "Bullet Points"
- "Duplex"
- "The Trees"
- "Second Language"
- "After Avery R. Young"
- "A Young Man"

II

- "Duplex"
- "Riddle"
- "Good White People"
- "Correspondence"
- "Trojan"
- "The Legend of Big and Fine"
- "The Peaches"
- "Night Shift"
- "Shovel"
- "The Long Way"
- "Dear Whiteness"
- "Of the Swan"
- "Entertainment Industry"
- "Stake"
- "Layover"

III

- "Duplex"
- "Of My Fury"
- "After Essex Hemphill"
- "Stay"
- "A.D."
- "Turn You Over"
- "The Virus"
- "The Rabbits"
- "Monotheism"
- "Token"
- "The Hammers"
- "I Know What I Love"
- "Crossing"
- "Deliverance"
- "Meditations at the New Orleans Jazz National Historical Park"
- "Dark"
- "Duplex"
- "Thighs and Ass"
- "Cakewalk"
- "Stand"
- "Duplex: Cento"

== Reception ==
Publishers Weekly called it "searing" and wrote that Jericho's duplex form "yields compelling results".

Elizabeth Lund of The Washington Post called it "compelling and forceful because it wonderfully balances the dark demands of memory and an indomitable strength."

== Awards and recognition ==
| Year | Award | Category | Result | Ref |
|---|---|---|---|---|
| 2019 | National Book Award | Poetry | Longlisted | |
| 2019 | National Book Critics Circle Award | Poetry | Shortlisted | |
| 2020 | Lambda Literary Award | Gay Poetry | Shortlisted | |
| 2020 | Pulitzer Prize | Poetry | Won | |

== Publication history ==
- The Tradition (paperback ed.). Copper Canyon Press. April 2, 2019. ISBN 978-1-55659-486-1. 110pp.
- The Tradition (hardcover ed.). Copper Canyon Press. February 4, 2020. ISBN 978-1-55659-602-5. 96pp.
