= Peter Everwine =

American writer (1930–2018)

- Born: Peter Paul Everwine; February 14, 1930; Detroit, Michigan, U.S.
- Died: October 28, 2018 (aged 88); Fresno, California, U.S.
- Occupation: Poet

Peter Paul Everwine (February 14, 1930 – October 28, 2018) was an American poet.

== Life ==
Born on February 14, 1930, in Detroit, Michigan, Everwine grew up in western Pennsylvania, and was educated in the Midwest. In 1962, he joined Philip Levine, on the faculty of Fresno State University. He retired from there in 1992.

He was a senior Fulbright lecturer in American poetry at the University of Haifa, Israel. In 2008, he was visiting writer at Reed College.

Everwine is the author of seven collections of poetry. His poetry has appeared in The Paris Review, Antaeus, and American Poetry Review.

He lived in Fresno, California, where he died on October 28, 2018, aged 88.

== Awards ==
- Collecting the Animals, which won the 1972 Lamont Poetry Prize.
- Stegner Fellow Stanford
- Horizon Awards 2008
- Best American Poetry 2008
- Pushcart Prize XVII
- Fellowships from The National Endowment for the Arts
- Guggenheim Fellowship 1975

== Work ==
- "Aubade in Autumn". The New Yorker. October 15, 2007.

=== Poetry books ===
- The Broken Frieze. The Hillside Press (Cornell College). 1958.
- Collecting the Animals. Carnegie Mellon University Press. 1972. ISBN 978-0-88748-324-0.
- Keeping the Night. Penumbra Press. 1977.
- Figures Made Visible in the Sadness of Time. Brighton Press. 2003.
- From the Meadow: Selected and New Poems. University of Pittsburgh Press. 2004. ISBN 978-0-8229-5844-4.
- Listening Long and Late. University of Pittsburgh Press. 2013.
- Pulling the Invisible but Heavy Cart; Last Poems. Stephen F. Austin State University Press at Nacagdoches, Texas. 2019. ISBN 978-1936205950.

=== Translation ===
- Natan Zach (2011). The Countries We Live In: The Selected Poems of Natan Zach 1955-1979. Tavern Books. ISBN 978-1-935635-08-6.
- Working the Song Fields, Spring 2009. (A collection of his Aztec translations)
- Natan Zach (1982). The Static Element. Atheneum. ISBN 978-0-689-11318-5.
- In the House of Light. Stone Wall Press. 1969. (His first book of Aztec translations )

=== Anthology ===
- M. L. Williams; Christopher Buckley; David Olivera, eds. (March 15, 2001). HOW MUCH EARTH:The Fresno Poets. Heyday Books. ISBN 978-0-9666691-7-6.
- Christopher Buckley; Gary Young, eds. (1999). "Peter Everwine". The geography of home. Heyday Books. p. 65. ISBN 978-1-890771-19-5. "Peter Everwine."

=== Ploughshares ===
- "Rain". Ploughshares. Spring 2008. Archived from the original on October 10, 2009.
- "After". Ploughshares. Winter 2007–08. Archived from the original on January 28, 2016.
- "One for the 5-String". Ploughshares. Winter 2007–08. Archived from the original on January 28, 2016.
