= Margaret Gibson (poet) =

American poet (born 1944)

- Born: 1944 (age 81–82); Philadelphia, Pennsylvania, U.S.
- Education: Hollins College; University of Virginia
- Occupation: Poet
- Spouse: David McKain (deceased)

Margaret Gibson (born 1944 in Philadelphia, Pennsylvania) is an American poet.

== Life ==
Margaret Gibson grew up in Richmond, Virginia, and was educated at Hollins College, and the University of Virginia. She went to Yaddo in 1975.

Gibson is Professor Emerita at the University of Connecticut.

She was named to a three-year term as Poet Laureate of Connecticut in 2019.

Gibson was married to the late David McKain, poet and author. She lives in Preston, Connecticut.

== Awards ==
- The Vigil, A Poem in Four Voices, a Finalist for the National Book Award in 1993
- Memories of the Future, The Daybooks of Tina Modotti, co-winner of the Melville Cane Award of the Poetry Society of America in 1986-87
- Long Walks in the Afternoon, the 1982 Lamont Selection of the Academy of American Poets
- National Endowment for the Arts Grant
- Lila Wallace/Reader's Digest Fellowship
- Grants from the Connecticut Commission on the Arts
- "Earth Elegy," the title poem of New and Selected Poems, won The James Boatwright III Prize for Poetry
- "Archaeology" was awarded a Pushcart Prize in 2001

== Works ==
- "Drifting Boat". Blackbird Magazine. Spring 2002.
- "Fox Fire at the Changing Tree". Blackbird Magazine. Spring 2002.
- "Next Morning Letter". Blackbird Magazine. Spring 2002.
- "Summer Birds and Flowers". Blackbird Magazine. Spring 2002.

=== Poetry Books ===
- Not Hearing the Wood Thrush, Louisiana State University Press, 2018. ISBN 978-0807168202
- Broken Cup, Louisiana State University Press, 2014. ISBN 978-0807156421
- Second Nature, Louisiana State University Press, 2010. ISBN 978-0807136959
- One Body: poems. Louisiana State University Press. 2007. ISBN 978-0807-132401
- Gibson, Margaret (2003). Autumn Grasses. LSU Press. ISBN 978-0-8071-2859-6.
- Icon and Evidence. Louisiana State University Press. 2001. ISBN 978-0-8071-2709-4.
- Earth Elegy, New and Selected Poems. Louisiana State University Press. 1997. ISBN 978-0-8071-2146-7.
- Gibson, Margaret (1993). The Vigil, A Poem in Four Voices. LSU Press. ISBN 978-0-8071-1868-9.
- Out in the Open. Louisiana State University Press. 1989. ISBN 978-0-8071-1518-3.
- Gibson, Margaret (1986). Memories of the Future, The Daybooks of Tina Modotti. LSU Press. ISBN 978-0-8071-1309-7.
- Long Walks in the Afternoon. Louisiana State University Press. 1982. ISBN 978-0-8071-1018-8.
- Signs. Louisiana State University Press. 1979. ISBN 978-0-8071-0493-4.
- Lunes: poems. Some of Us Press. 1973.

=== Memoir ===
- The Prodigal Daughter: Reclaiming an Unfinished Childhood. University of Missouri Press. 2008. ISBN 978-0-8262-1783-7.

=== Anthologies ===
- Leon Stokesbury, ed. (1999). "Margaret Gibson". The made thing: an anthology of contemporary Southern poetry. University of Arkansas Press. p. 114. ISBN 978-1-55728-579-9. "Margaret Gibson poet."
- Joseph M. Flora; Amber Vogel; Bryan Albin Giemza, eds. (2006). Southern Writers. LSU Press. ISBN 978-0-8071-3123-7.
