= Sandra Alcosser =

American poet

- Born: February 3, 1944 (age 81); Washington, D.C., United States
- Occupations: Professor, poet

Sandra B. Alcosser (born February 3, 1944) is an American poet. She was appointed the first state poet laureate of Montana from July 13, 2005 - August 13, 2007 and was superseded by Greg Pape.

== Life ==
She started the MFA in writing program at San Diego State University and is on the faculty of the low-residency MFA in writing program at Pacific University.

== Awards ==
- James Laughlin Award, for Except By Nature
- 1997 National Poetry Series, for Except by Nature

== Works ==
- A Fish To Feed All Hunger (Ahsahta Press, 1986)
- Except By Nature (Graywolf Press, 1998)
