= Peter Johnson (poet) =

American poet and novelist

- Born: 1951 (age 74–75); Buffalo, New York
- Education: B.A. from the State University of New York at Buffalo, M.A., and Ph.D. in English from the University of New Hampshire
- Occupations: Poet, novelist
- Notable work: Miracles & Mortifications, Eduardo & "I", Pretty Happy!, Love Poems for the Millennium, I'm A Man, What Happened, Loserville
- Awards: 2001 James Laughlin Award

Peter Johnson (b. 1951 Buffalo, New York) is an American poet, and novelist.

== Life ==
He received his B.A. from the State University of New York at Buffalo, and his M.A. and Ph.D. in English from the University of New Hampshire.

His poems and fiction have appeared in Field, Denver Quarterly, The Iowa Review, Indiana Review, Quarterly West, North Dakota Quarterly, The Party Train: A Collection of North American Prose Poetry, and Beloit Fiction Journal.

Johnson is the founder and editor of The Prose Poem: An International Journal, and the editor of The Best of The Prose Poem: An International Journal (White Pine Press, 2000). He is contributing editor to American Poetry Review, Web del Sol, and Slope, and teaches creative writing and children's literature at Providence College, Rhode Island, where he lives with his wife, Genevieve, and two sons, Kurt and Lucas.

== Awards ==
He is the winner of the 2001 James Laughlin Award for his second collection of prose poems, Miracles & Mortifications (2001). He received a creative writing award in 2002 from Rhode Council on the Arts and a fellowship in 1999 from the National Endowment for the Arts.

== Works ==
- "Just Listen", poets.org
- "Hell", pith

=== Poetry books ===
- Miracles & Mortifications. White Pine Press. 2001. ISBN 978-1-893996-18-2.
- Eduardo & "I". White Pine Press. 2006. ISBN 978-1-893996-46-5.
- Pretty Happy!. White Pine Press. 1997. ISBN 978-1-877727-75-7.

=== Chapbooks ===
- Love Poems for the Millennium. Quale Press. 1998. ISBN 978-0-9656161-2-6.
- I'm A Man. Rain Crow Publishing. 1998. ISBN 0-89754-157-X.

=== Novel ===
- What Happened. Front Street Books. 2007. ISBN 978-1-932425-67-3. "Peter Johnson loserville."
- Loserville. Front Street. 2009. ISBN 978-1-59078-581-2.

=== Short stories ===
- I'm a Man (2003).

== Review ==
About his work, the poet Bruce Smith has said:

Because Peter Johnson does not guide himself either by the turns and counterturns of verse or the horizontal urge of prose, he must continually reinvent the wheel and its destination. He writes with a lover's lavish extravagance and a yogi's self-discipline. His funny poems are heartbreaking and his serious ones are hilarious.
