= James Scully (poet) =

American poet (1937–2020)

- Born: 1937; New Haven, Connecticut, U.S.
- Died: December 11, 2020 (aged 82–83)
- Occupation: Poet
- Education: University of Connecticut (PhD)
- Notable awards: Lamont Poetry Prize (1967)

James Scully (1937 – December 11, 2020) was an American poet.

== Biography ==
Scully attended Roman Catholic grammar and high schools. He was a beneficiary of the post–World War II economic expansion, including tuition-free access to a local teachers college. In 1964, supported by a National Defense Fellowship, he received a Ph.D. from the University of Connecticut.

Recently he published a journal of impressions, incorporating historical information following a visit to the former Yugoslavia. This was published originally in Serbian translation. Azul Editions published the English language text: Vagabond Flags: Serbia & Kosovo (2009).

Angel in Flames: Selected Poems & Translations 1967-2011 is the most recent of eleven books of poems. A collection of critical essays, Line Break: Poetry As Social Practice (1988) was reissued in 2005 with a foreword by Adrienne Rich. The many translations and co-translations include Aeschylus' Prometheus Bound (1975) with C J Herington, “The Complete Plays of Sophocles” (2011) with Robert Bagg, various Latin American texts plus Quechua texts or songs teased from Spanish translations. He was the founding editor of the Art on the Line series published by Curbstone Press: booklets of essays and interviews by 20th century artists and writers speaking to where their art and their social engagement interact. Scully died on December 11, 2020.

== Awards ==
- Ingram Merrill Foundation Fellowship (Rome, Italy 1962 - 1963)
- Winner of the 1967 Lamont Award for "The Marches".
- recipient of a 1973 Guggenheim Fellowships. "Santiago Poems".
- Quechua Peoples Poetry, Winner of the 1977 Islands & Continents Translation Award
- Bookbuilders of Boston Award for book cover design (Apollo Helmet 1983)
- Fellowships from the National Endowment for the Arts
- Jenny Taine Memorial Award
- California State University, Chico has named a poetry reading series for him.

== Works ==
- "There Is No Truth to the Rumor; Donatello's Version". Logos Journal. 7 (1).

=== Poetry ===
- The Marches. Holt, Rinehart and Winston. 1967.
- Communications (with Grandin Conover, Poetry Signature Six, The Massachusetts review, 1970)
- Avenue of the Americas. University of Massachusetts Press. 1971. ISBN 978-0-87023-099-8.
- Santiago Poems. Curbstone Press. 1975. ISBN 978-0-915306-21-3.
- Scrap Book. Ziesing Brothers. 1977. ISBN 978-0-917488-03-0.
- May day. Minnesota Review Press. 1980. ISBN 978-0-936484-00-6.
- Apollo Helmet. Curbstone Press. 1983. ISBN 978-0-915306-38-1. Paperback: ISBN 978-0-915306-39-8
- Raging Beauty: Selected Poems. Azul Editions. 1994. ISBN 978-0-9632363-7-1.
- Words Without Music (Privately Printed limited edition 2004)
- Boxcars (Azul Editions 2006)
- Donatello's Version. Curbstone Press. 2007. ISBN 978-1-931896-31-3.
- Oceania. Azul Editions. 2008. ISBN 978-1-885214-51-5.
- Angel in Flames. Smokestack Books. 2011. ISBN 978-0-9564175-8-9.

=== Translations ===
- Aeschylus (1975). Prometheus Bound. C. J. Herington, James Scully. Oxford University Press. ISBN 978-0-19-506165-9.
- Quechua Peoples Poetry. Maria A. Proser. Curbstone Press. 1977. ISBN 978-0-915306-09-1.
- Teresa de Jesus (1979). De Repente / All Of A Sudden. Maria A. Proser and Arlene Scully.
- Sophocles (2011). Complete Plays of Sophocles. Harper Perennial. ISBN 978-0-06-202034-5.

=== Essays ===
- Modern Poetics, a.k.a. Modern Poets on Modern Poetry. McGraw-Hill. 1965.
- Line Break:Poetry as Social Practice. Curbstone Press. 2005. ISBN 978-1-931896-18-4.
- Vagabond Flags. Azul Editions. 2009. ISBN 978-1-885214-53-9.
