= Martin Walls =

Martin Walls (born Brighton, England) is a British-American poet and the first British-born winner of the US Library of Congress Witter Bynner Fellowship.

== Biography ==
Martin Walls was born in Brighton, England in 1970 and now lives in Baldwinsville, New York with his wife, Christine, and their child Alex. A US Library of Congress Witter Bynner Fellow, he is the author of three books of poems: Small Human Detail in Care of National Trust (2000), Commonwealth (2005), and The Solvay Process (2009).

In addition, Walls edits the "online anthology" The Book of Snails, a collection of poetry and science writing.

Walls's collaboration with photographer Philip MacCabe and graphic designer Shadric Toop can be found at smallhumandetail.com. His blog on sustainability and going green can be read at amosoneplanet.blogspot.com.

Walls's poetry has been published in The Nation, The Ohio Review, Salt Hill, Epoch, The Gettysburg Review, Boulevard, Five Points, Kestrel, Blackbird, Commonweal, Beloit Poetry Journal, and elsewhere.

He holds a BA (Hons) from the University of East Anglia, England. He also attended Purdue University, from which he holds an M.F.A. degree.

He has taught poetry writing at Ball State University and the Downtown Writers Center, part of the Syracuse YMCA Y Arts curriculum. He has also taught at Syracuse University, Onondaga Community College, Cazenovia College, and SUNY Cortland.

In Syracuse he was a journalist and editor at Eagle Newspapers, where he founded the Solvay-Geddes Express newspaper. As a senior editor at Bentley-Hall, Inc., he helped found Making Music, a magazine for amateur musicians. Walls also edited International Musician for the American Federation of Musicians. Walls plays drums, percussion, and resonator guitar.

Walls is communications manager for the Institute for National Security and Counterterrorism at Syracuse University. He has been communications manager at the Syracuse Center of Excellence in Environmental and Energy Systems and the Syracuse University Office of Community Engagement and Economic Development. He has also performed communications work for Syracuse University Project Advance, AMP Urology, CNY Jazz Central, and the Bluebell Railway.

The Solvay Process
- Author: Martin Walls
- Cover artist: Philip Memmer (designer)
- Language: English
- Series: Tiger Bark Poets
- Genre: Poetry
- Publisher: Tiger Bark Press
- Publication date: 2009
- Publication place: USA
- Media type: Trade Paperback
- ISBN: 0981675212
- Followed by: Karen Swenson, Pilgrim Into Silence

== Awards ==
- 2010 Syracuse University Whitman School "40 Under 40" Award
- 2005 Witter Bynner Fellowship of the US Library of Congress
- 2000 A. Brohman Roth "Newcomer Award" from the Syracuse Press Club
- 1998 The Nation/"Discovery" prize
- Breadloaf Writers Conference scholarship
- Two individual artist grants from the Syracuse Cultural Resources Council

== Works ==
- "Cicadas at the End of Summer", Poetry Foundation
- "A BEND IN ONONDAGA CREEK", VALPARAISO POETRY REVIEW
- "Crows", Blackbird
- "Despatches from The Republic of Winter; 1978" (PDF). Beloit Poetry Journal. 53 (4): 36–37. Summer 2003.
- Small Human Detail in Care of National Trust. New Issues Press. 2000. ISBN 978-0-932826-85-5.
- Commonwealth. March Street Press. 2005. ISBN 978-1-59661-016-3.
- The Solvay Process
- The Book of Snails
