= Constance Carrier =

American poet (1908–1991)

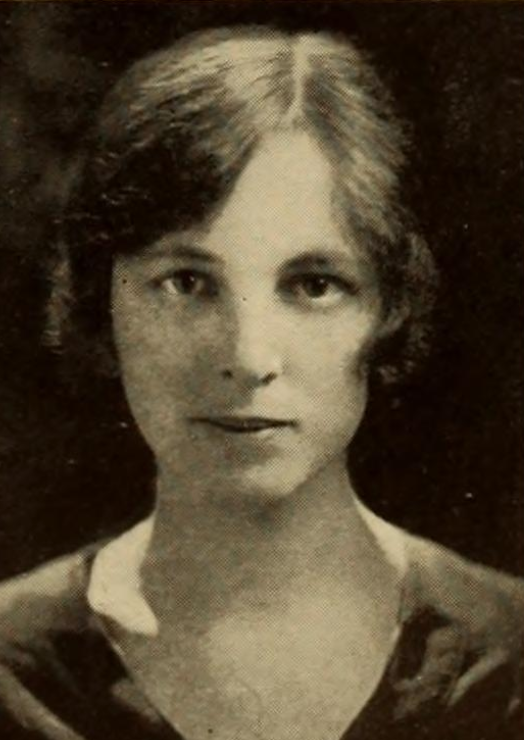
- Constance Carrier, from the 1929 yearbook of Smith College
- Born: Constance Virginia Carrier; July 29, 1908; New Britain, Connecticut, U.S.
- Died: December 7, 1991 (aged 83); New Britain, Connecticut, U.S.
- Education: Smith College; Trinity College
- Occupations: Teacher, poet, translator
- Writing career
- Genre: poetry

Constance Virginia Carrier (July 29, 1908 – December 7, 1991) was an American teacher, translator, and poet, based in Connecticut.

== Early life and education ==
Carrier was born in New Britain, Connecticut, the daughter of Lucius Alonso Carrier and Lillian M. Jost Carrier. Her father was on the staff at Trinity College in Hartford. She was descended from Martha Carrier, one of the women hanged during the notorious Salem witch trials of 1692. The witch trials were the subject of Carrier's last volume of poetry. She graduated from Smith College in 1929. As a student at Smith, she was inspired to become a poet by reading Louise Bogan and Emily Dickinson. She earned a master's degree at Trinity College in 1940.

== Career ==
Carrier taught at New Britain High School, and then five years at Hall High School in West Hartford, before retiring in 1969. She taught several subjects, but is most remembered for teaching Latin. She also taught in summer programs at Wesleyan University and Tufts University, and held residencies at Yaddo and the MacDowell Colony.

Carrier's poetry was published in the New Yorker, New York Quarterly, Ploughshares, Poetry, and Harper's. The Middle Voice won the 1954 Lamont Prize, given by the Academy of American Poets.

In the 1960s and 1970s, Carrier published translations of the works three classical Roman writers: the playwright Terence, and the poets Propertius and Tibullus. In 1964 she spoke at the Classical Association of New England (CANE) meeting at Dartmouth College.

== Personal life and legacy ==
Carrier died in 1991, at the age of 83, in New Britain. The anniversary of her 100th birthday was celebrated in New Britain. Her papers are in the Mortimer Rare Book Collection of Smith College.

== Works ==
=== Poetry ===
- The Middle Voice. Denver: A. Swallow. 1954. Archived from the original on 2012-10-17 – via Questia.
- The Angled Road. Chicago: Swallow Press. 1973. ISBN 0-8040-0655-5.
- Witchcraft Poems: Salem, 1692. Roslyn, N.Y.: Stone House Press. 1988. ISBN 0-937035-11-4.

=== Translations ===
- Palmer Bovie, ed. (1974). The complete comedies of Terence; modern verse translations. New Brunswick, N.J.: Rutgers University Press. ISBN 0-8135-0775-8.
- Palmer Bovie, ed. (1992). Terence, the comedies. Baltimore: Johns Hopkins University Press. ISBN 0-8018-4354-5.
- Titus Maccius Plautus (1995). "Amphitryon". In David R. Slavitt; Smith Palmer Bovie (eds.). Plautus. Johns Hopkins University Press. ISBN 978-0-8018-5071-4.
- Tibullus. The Poems of Tibullus. Constance Carrier.
- Propertius (1963). The poems of Propertius. Constance Carrier. Bloomington.

=== Anthologies ===
- Robert Hass; John Hollander; Carolyn Kizer; Marjorie Perloff; Nathaniel Mackey, eds. (April 2000). American Poetry: The Twentieth Century: e.e. cummings to May Swenson. Vol. II. Penguin Group. ISBN 978-1-883011-78-9.
