= Jaswinder Bolina =

American poet

Jaswinder Bolina (born 1978) is an American poet and essayist from Chicago.

== Early life and education ==
Jaswinder Bolina was born in 1978 in Chicago, Illinois, in the United States to Indian parents. He received an undergraduate B.A. in philosophy from Loyola University in Chicago, and was awarded a Master of Fine Arts in creative writing by the University of Michigan, and a Ph.D. in English (concentrating on creative writing) from Ohio University.

== Career ==
As of November 2024, Bolina is an associate professor on the creative writing faculty in the Department of English Literature and Creative Writing at the University of Miami, where he has taught in the MFA program.

=== Writing corpus ===
As of the 2020s, Bolina is known as a poet and an essayist.

His full-length poetry collections include;

- Carrier Wave (2007)
- Phantom Camera (2013), which won the Green Rose Prize in Poetry from New Issues Poetry & Prose;
- The 44th of July (2019).
- English as a Second Language and Other Poems (2023)

He is also the author of the chapbook The Tallest Building in America (2014), and of a book of essays, Of Color (2020). He has also contributed essays to several anthologies. As of 2019, his poems were being published on the Poetry Society of America's website.

Bolina is featured in Joshua Marie Wilkinson's Poets on Teaching, in a chapter entitled, "What I Tell Them," which begins

I'd like to tell them there are too many poets. I'd like to tell them we don't need any more and don't need any more competition. Too many throbbing bodies, not enough room in the bed. I'd like to tell them, you should go to other departments. You should go to the other department and become exquisite bankers future in-laws will favor. You matter too little, and anyway there isn't any place for poetry. You know too little, what are you doing here? / I don't say these things, though I think sometimes I should. ...

== Personal life ==
Bolina is married with one child.
