= Ralph Angel =

American poet and educator (1951–2020)

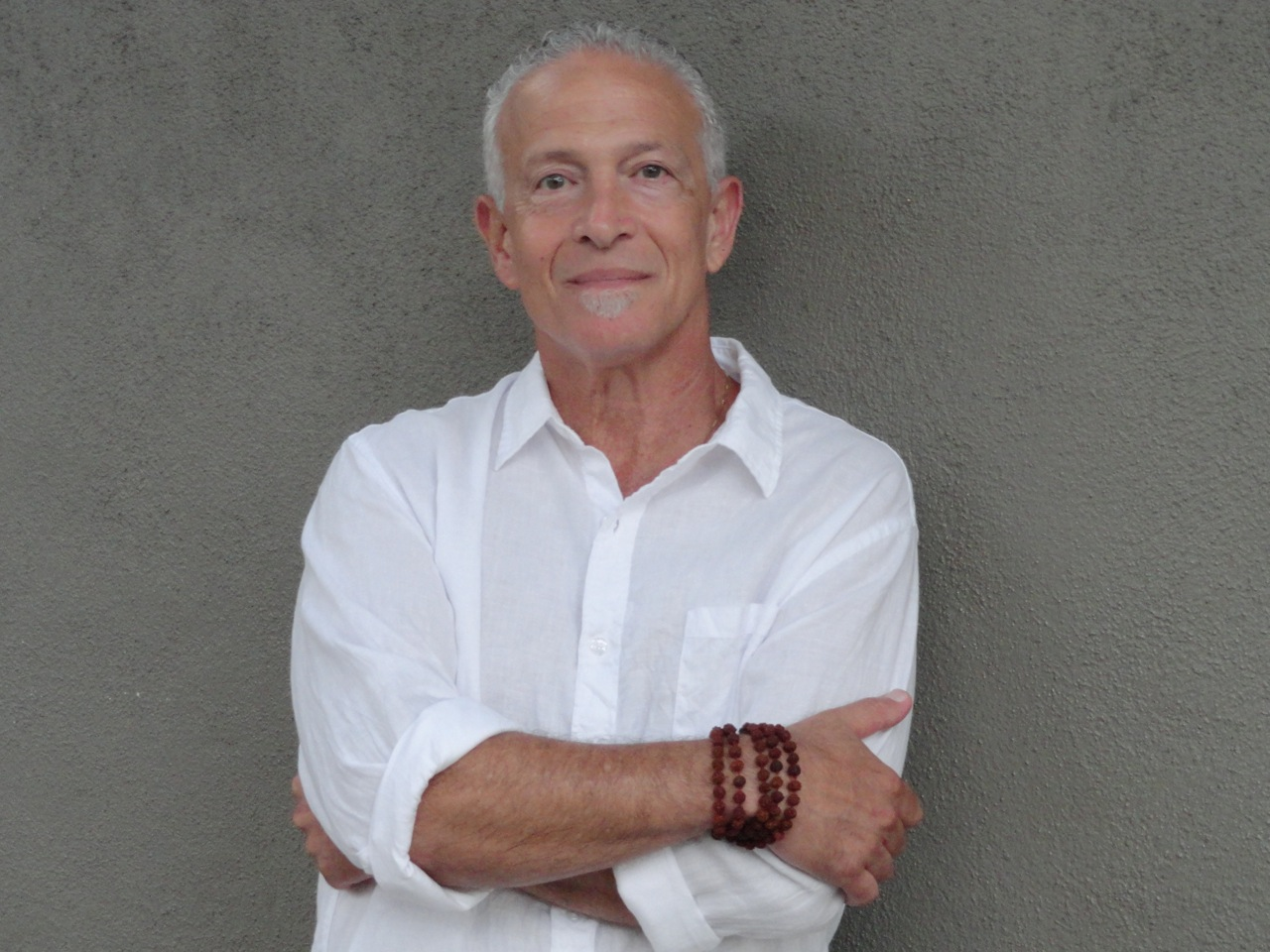
- Photo by Mary Cahill
- Born: May 2, 1951; Seattle, Washington, U.S.
- Died: March 6, 2020 (aged 68)
- Education: University of Washington (BA); University of California, Irvine (MFA)
- Occupations: Edith R. White Distinguished Professor, University of Redlands; MFA in Writing, Poetry Faculty, Vermont College of Fine Arts
- Writing career
- Notable works: Your Moon; Exceptions and Melancholies; Poem of the Deep Song (Translation; Federico García Lorca); Twice Removed; Neither World; Anxious Latitudes
- Notable awards: 2013 Green Rose Poetry Prize; 2007 PEN USA Poetry Award; 2003 Willis Barnstone Poetry Translation Prize; 1995 James Laughlin Award of the Academy of American Poets
- Website: ralphangel.com

Ralph Angel (May 2, 1951 – March 6, 2020) was an American poet and educator.

== Early life and education ==
Born on May 2, 1951, in Seattle, Washington, Angel was a second-generation American of Sephardic Jewish descent. He attended inner-city public schools in Seattle and, while working on freight trains for the Union Pacific Railroad, earned his Bachelor of Arts degree at the University of Washington. He later received a Master of Fine Arts degree at the University of California, Irvine, and lived in and around Los Angeles.

== Career ==
Angel traveled widely in Europe, North Africa, and Central and South America.

His first collection of poetry, Anxious Latitudes (Wesleyan University Press, 1986), was widely praised and reviewed. His second book, Neither World (Miami University Press, 1995), which received the James Laughlin Award of the Academy of American Poets, garnered him national prominence. A third work, Twice Removed (Sarabande Books, 2001), was nominated for the Los Angeles Times Book Award, and was a finalist for the Washington State Book Award. His fourth collection, Exceptions and Melancholies: Poems 1986-2006 (Sarabande Books, 2006), was honored with the 2007 PEN USA Award for Poetry. His final collection, Your Moon (New Issues Poetry & Prose, 2013), was awarded the 2013 Green Rose Poetry Prize.

Angel's translation of the Federico García Lorca collection, Poema del cante jondo (Poem of the Deep Song), received a Willis Barnstone Poetry Translation Prize. In the "Afterword," Angel commented, "I come from a household of three languages—Ladino, Hebrew, and English—one that I could understand but not speak, one that I could sing but not understand, and one that is the language of my country, at some distance, always, from my home." On translating Lorca's poetry, Angel noted that he was familiar with the music that the poems paid homage to, as "It resembled the incantatory medieval singing of the Sephardic synagogue that I grew up in."

In his 1996 Los Angeles Times review of Neither World (Miami University Press, 1995), poet Mark Doty observed that "The Los Angeles that Angel's poetry occupies and creates is never named, and for good reason, since it is not local but broadly American, a version of the psychological landscape of any American city today."

Angel's poems have appeared in scores of magazines, in the U.S. and abroad, and have been collected in numerous anthologies, including The Best American Poetry, American Hybrid, Poets of the New Century, and Forgotten Language. Other literary awards included a gift from the Elgin Cox Trust, a Pushcart Prize, the Gertrude Stein Award, a Fulbright Foundation fellowship, and the Bess Hokin Award of the Modern Poetry Association.

In his later years, he was Edith R. White Distinguished Professor at the University of Redlands, and a member of the MFA in Writing faculty at Vermont College of Fine Arts.

== Death ==
On March 9, 2020, University of Redlands Provost Kathy Ogren announced that Ralph Angel had died after suffering from a brief, unspecified illness and subsequent hospitalization. It was later reported that Angel had died on March 6, with his wife Mary by his side.

== Books ==
- Your Moon (Kalamazoo, MI: New Issues Poetry & Prose), 2013
- Exceptions and Melancholies: Poems 1986-2006 (Louisville, KY: Sarabande Books), 2006
- Poem of the Deep Song, Trans., Federico García Lorca (Louisville, KY: Sarabande Books), 2006
- Twice Removed (Louisville, KY: Sarabande Books), 2001
- Neither World (Oxford, OH: Miami University Press), 1995
- Anxious Latitudes (Middletown, CT: Wesleyan University Press), 1986
- History, limited-edition chapbook (San Diego, CA: Atticus Press), 1982

== Awards and honors ==
- 2013: Green Rose Poetry Prize, New Issues Poetry & Prose (Your Moon)
- 2007: PEN USA Literary Award in Poetry (Exceptions and Melancholies: Poems 1986-2006)
- 2006: Gertrude Stein Award, Sun & Moon Press
- 2005-06: Elgin Cox Trust Literary Arts Gift
- 2004, 2002: Poet in Residence, The Poet's House, Falcarragh, Ireland
- 2003: Willis Barnstone Poetry Translation Prize
- 1999: Poet in Residence, Fundacíon Valparaiso, Mojacar, Spain
- 1995: James Laughlin Award, Academy of American Poets (Neither World)
- 1995: Pushcart Prize
- 1992-93: Fulbright Foundation Fellowship, Slovenia
- 1988: Bess Hokin Prize, Modern Language Association
