= Jericho Brown =

American poet and professor (born 1976)

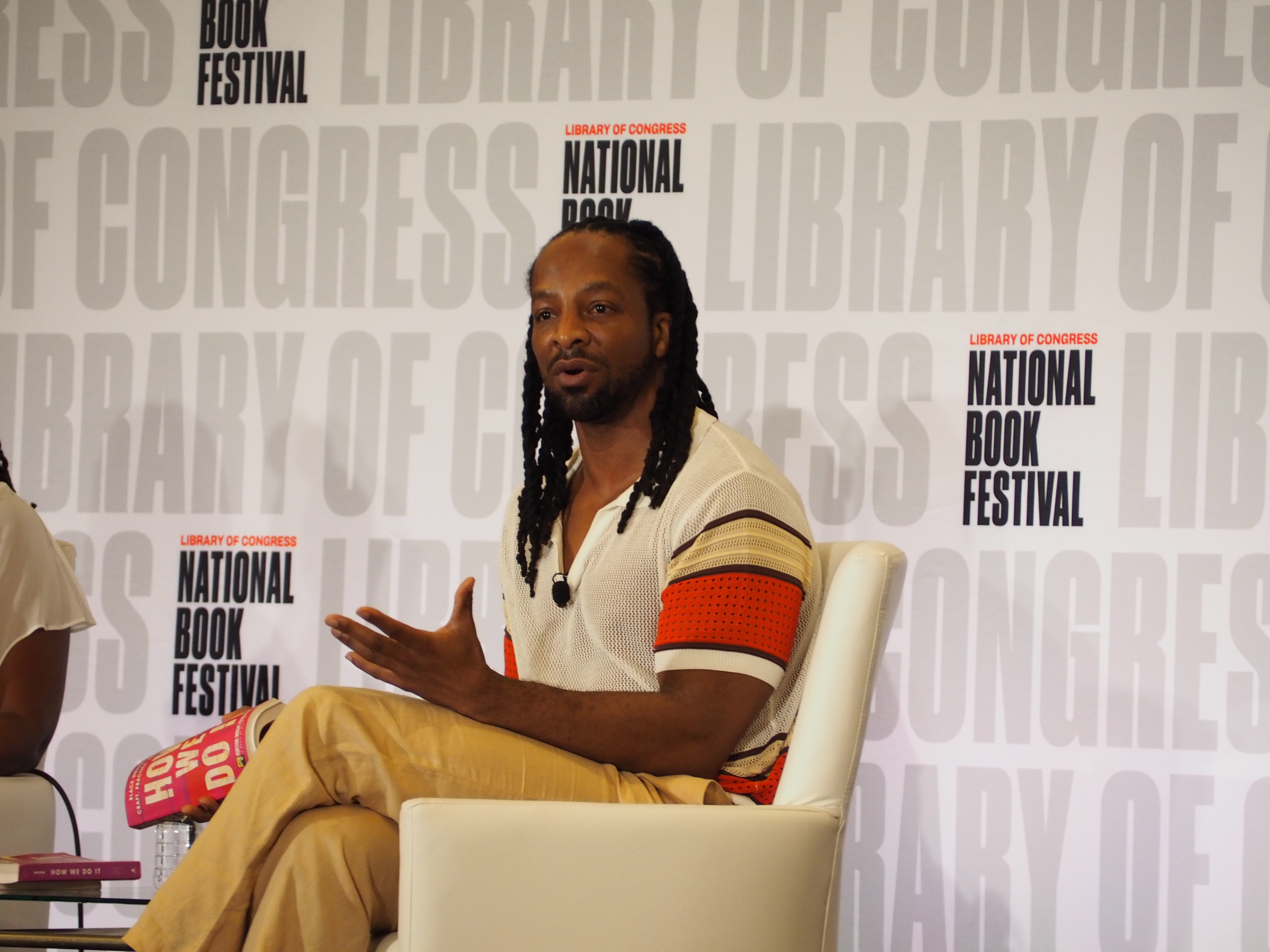
- Jericho Brown reading at the 2023 National Book Festival
- Born: Nelson Demery III; April 14, 1976 (age 50); Shreveport, Louisiana, U.S.
- Education: Dillard University (BA); University of New Orleans (MFA); University of Houston (PhD)
- Occupations: Poet; professor
- Writing career
- Language: English
- Notable work: The Tradition (2019)
- Website: jerichobrown.com

Jericho Brown (born Nelson Demery III; April 14, 1976) is an American poet and writer. Born and raised in Shreveport, Louisiana, Brown has worked as an educator at institutions such as the University of Houston, the University of San Diego, and Emory University. His poems have been published in The Nation, New England Review, The New Republic, Oxford American, and The New Yorker, among others. He released his first book of prose and poetry, Please, in 2008. His second book, The New Testament, was released in 2014. His 2019 collection of poems, The Tradition, garnered widespread critical acclaim.

Brown has won several accolades throughout his career, including a Whiting Award, an American Book Award, an Anisfield-Wolf Book Award, and the Pulitzer Prize for Poetry.

== Early life and education ==
Born Nelson Demery III and raised in Shreveport, Louisiana, Brown later changed his name and graduated from Dillard University, where he was initiated as a member of Alpha Phi Alpha fraternity, through the Beta Phi chapter, in the fall of 1995. He also graduated from the University of New Orleans with an MFA, and from the University of Houston with a Ph.D.

== Career ==
Brown was a teaching fellow in the English department at the University of Houston from 2002 to 2007, a visiting professor at San Diego State University's MFA program in spring 2009, and an assistant professor of English at the University of San Diego. He has also taught at numerous conferences and workshops, including the Iowa Summer Writing Festival at the University of Iowa. He is an associate professor of English and director of the Creative Writing Program at Emory University in Atlanta, Georgia. Previously, he worked as a speechwriter for the mayor of New Orleans.

In 2011, Brown received the 2011 National Endowment for the Arts Fellowship for Poetry. His poems have appeared in The Iowa Review, jubilat, The Nation, New England Review, The New Republic, Oxford American, The New Yorker, Enkare Review, and The Best American Poetry. He serves as an Assistant Editor at Callaloo.

His first book, Please (New Issues Poetry & Prose, 2008), won the American Book Award. His second book, a book of poetry titled The New Testament (Copper Canyon Press, 2014), won the 2015 Anisfield-Wolf Book Award.

Brown's third book, a collection of poems titled The Tradition (Copper Canyon Press, 2019), garnered widespread critical acclaim and won the Pulitzer Prize for Poetry.

Brown published his fourth book in 2023, How We Do it: Black Writers on Craft, Practice and Skill, an anthology of 31 essays and interviews from African American authors.

== Awards ==
- 2024 MacArthur Fellowship
- 2020 Pulitzer Prize for Poetry
- 2019 Finalist, National Book Critics Circle Award for Poetry
- 2019 Finalist, National Book Award for Poetry
- 2016 Guggenheim Fellowship
- 2015 Anisfield-Wolf Book Award
- 2011 National Endowment for the Arts Fellowship for Poetry
- 2009 American Book Award
- 2009 Whiting Award
- 2009–2010 fellowship at the Radcliffe Institute for Advanced Study at Harvard University

== Works ==
=== Articles ===
- Brown, Jericho; Hall, James Allen (September 2009). "Danger by Desire: A Conversation between Jericho Brown & James Allen Hall". Boxcar Poetry Preview. No. 22. ISSN 1931-1761. Archived from the original on June 15, 2023.
- "The Long Distance Between Poems". Boston Review. Cambridge, Massachusetts. April 29, 2016.

=== Interviews ===
- "I'm not scared of my fear: Jericho Brown on craft, politics, and compassion in poetry" (Interview). Interviewed by Elizabeth Hoover. Harrisonburg, Virginia: James Madison University. September 1, 2014.
- "A Talk with Jericho Brown". Willow Spring Magazine (Interview). Interviewed by Josh Anthony; Hannah Cobb; Caylie Herrmann; and Kari Rueckert. Cheney, Washington: Eastern Washington University. March 29, 2019.
- "Mischief and Sorrow: An Interview with Jericho Brown". The Kenyon Review (Interview). Interviewed by Honorée Fanonne Jeffers. Gambier, Ohio: Kenyon College. July 2019. ISSN 0163-075X. JSTOR 0163075X.

=== Books ===
- Please. University of Michigan: New Issues Poetry & Prose/Western Michigan University. October 20, 2008. ISBN 978-1-930974-79-1.
- The New Testament. Port Townsend, Washington: Copper Canyon Press. 2014. ISBN 978-1-55659-457-1.
- The Tradition. Port Townsend, Washington: Copper Canyon Press. April 2, 2019. ISBN 9781556594861.
- Brown, Jericho; Taylor, Darlene (July 4, 2023). How We Do It: Black Writers on Craft, Practice, and Skill. New York City, New York: HarperCollins. ISBN 978-0063278189.

=== Poems ===
- "Rick". AGNI. Boston University. March 2007. Archived from the original on February 19, 2009.
- "Pause". Prairie Schooner. 82 (1): 77–78. March 2008. doi:10.1353/psg.0.0009. S2CID 71881295.
- "The Burning Bush". Prairie Schooner. 82 (1): 78. March 2008. doi:10.1353/psg.0.0009. S2CID 71881295.
- "Herman Finley Is Dead". Prairie Schooner. 82 (1): 79–80. March 2008. doi:10.1353/psg.0.0009. S2CID 71881295.
- "To Be Seen". The Missouri Review. University of Missouri. April 30, 2008. Archived from the original on February 9, 2023.
- "Elegy". Rumpus Magazine. May 16, 2009. Archived from the original on December 2, 2022.
- "Thrive". oxfordamerican.org. Oxford American. October 2, 2014. Archived from the original on November 29, 2014.
- "N'em'". The New York Times. New York City, New York (published April 19, 2015). April 17, 2015. p. 23. Archived from the original on January 9, 2022. "The colloquialism of the title, which means "and them" — as in "Tell your mama 'n'em I said hello" — encompasses a host of people made familiar by the world of the poem. Most of us have known them: elders and distant ancestors whose way of being was rooted in the wisdom of folk knowledge, a generation now all but gone. Poem selected by Natasha Trethewey."
- Armleder, John; Brown, Jericho (February 25, 2016). "An Artist and a Poet on Coupling". T. New York City, New York: The New York Times (published March 6, 2016). p. 114. "For T's ongoing series, the Swiss performance artist, painter and sculptor John Armleder created a response to a poem by Jericho Brown, 2015 winner of the Ainsfield-Wolf Book Award for Poetry."
- "Night Shift". The New Yorker. New York City, New York (published April 9, 2018). April 2, 2018. Archived from the original on June 3, 2023.
- "The Rabbits". What Nature. Cambridge, Massachusetts: Boston Review. April 20, 2018.
- "Foreday in the Morning". Time. New York City, New York: Time USA, LLC. (published August 8, 2018). July 26, 2018. Archived from the original on April 12, 2023.
- "Dark". The New York Times. New York City, New York (published January 20, 2019). January 17, 2019. p. 21. "In this charming yet sobering lyric, Jericho Brown confronts his own image as a black man — what those on the outside imagine they see, and what he can't help carrying inside, locked from view. Driven by the lilt of the blues (ghosted in the buried rhymes of books/looks, concern/earn, blue/new, cracked/black), the layers multiply and intersect with sad, irrefutable logic. A relentless dismantling of identity, a difficult jewel of a poem: painfully candid one minute, in your face the next — and as we approach Martin Luther King Jr. Day, still distressingly apropos. Selected by Rita Dove"
- "Say Thank You Say I'm Sorry". The New York Times. New York City, New York (published June 21, 2020). June 15, 2020. p. 19. Archived from the original on March 24, 2023. "The Pulitzer Prize-winning poet Jericho Brown writes for the Book Review about life during the pandemic."
- "Inaugural". The New York Times Magazine. Illustration by Rob Sato. New York City, New York. January 20, 2021. "By Jericho Brown, winner of the 2020 Pulitzer Prize in Poetry, on the occasion of the inauguration of Joe Biden and Kamala Harris."
