= Richard Kenney (poet) =

American poet

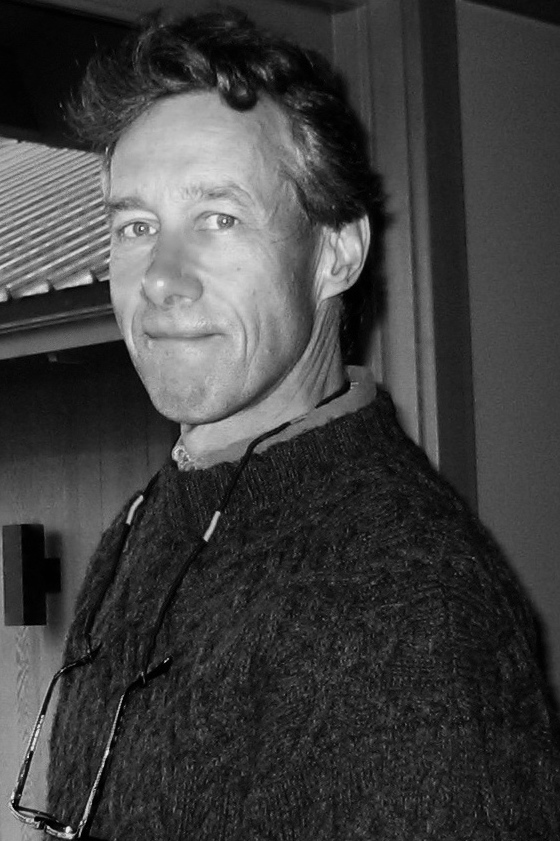
- Born: Richard L. Kenney; August 10, 1948 (age 78); Glens Falls, New York, United States
- Occupation: Poet
- Writing career
- Period: 1983-present

Richard L. Kenney (born 1948) is a poet and professor of English at the University of Washington. He is the author of five books of poetry: The Evolution of the Flightless Bird, Orrery, The Invention of the Zero, The One-Strand River, and Terminator.

== Biography ==
Richard Kenney was born to Laurence and Martha (Clare) Kenney on August 10, 1948, in Glens Falls, New York.

After graduating from Dartmouth College in 1970, Kenney won a Reynolds Fellowship and studied Celtic lore in Ireland, Scotland, and Wales. He teaches in the English department at the University of Washington and has published in many magazines and journals, including the New Yorker, the Atlantic Monthly, and The American Scholar. Kenney and his family live in Port Townsend, Washington.

=== Achievements and awards ===
- 1983 Yale Series of Younger Poets Prize, Yale University Press, for The Evolution of the Flightless Bird
- 1985 John Simon Guggenheim Memorial Foundation fellow
- 1986 Peter I. B. Lavan Younger Poet Award, Academy of American Poets
- 1986 American Academy in Rome fellowship in literature, American Academy and Institute of Arts and Letters
- 1987 John D. and Catherine T. MacArthur Foundation fellow
- 1994 Lannan Literary Award, $50,000
- 2002 Bogliasco Foundation Fellow

=== Influences ===
Drawing from many great writers and thinkers throughout time, Kenney often includes references to them in his works. James Merrill influenced him the most, and, fittingly so, his third book, The Invention of the Zero, is dedicated to him. Other notable influences include W. B. Yeats, Gerard Manley Hopkins, Robert Lowell, and Philip Larkin.

The Invention of the Zero was also specifically influenced by:

•John McPhee—his geological treatises echoes the persona of 'The Invention of the Zero.'

•Samuel Beckett—evident influence in 'Epilog: Read Only Memory.'

•James Joyce—similar in abundant usage of "puns, exotic allusions, and the artist-as-the-creator theme."

•Ezra Pound—Kenney's style mirrors Pound's "rapid-fire imagery"

• Greco-Roman mythologies, biblical and historical references, and hypothetical prehistoric landmasses

_{Taken from Holinger's review in The Midwest Quarterly. See Bibliography.}

== Works ==
Known for having an avalanching and original style, James Merrill best sums it up in his foreword to The Evolution of the Flightless Bird:

"The poetic wheels just spin and spin, getting nowhere fast. But Kenney--it's what one likes best about him--nearly always has an end in view, a story to tell."

•The Evolution of the Flightless Bird, Yale University Press, 1984

•Orrery, Atheneum, 1985

•The Invention of the Zero, Knopf (New York), 1993

=== The Evolution of the Flightless Bird ===
Noted for winning the Series of Younger Poets competition in 1983, The Evolution of the Flightless Bird is the first of four books that Kenney has published so far. Contest judge James Merrill praised its daring stylistic approach in the foreword. Containing three sections of poetry ('The Hours of the Day,' 'First Poems,' and 'Heroes'), the book is made up of "not well-wrought urns so much as complex molecules programmed to coalesce into larger structures" (Merrill, foreword). But what makes this book stand out is not that it consists of multiple sonnets, but that the delivery is so original and so far-fetched that its publication sparked much discussion about Kenney's style. A book with images varying from sea to battle scenes, The Evolution of the Flightless Bird marks the beginning of Kenney's career as a poet.

=== Orrery ===
Metaphorically centered around the title^{1}, Orrery is a single story told from the inclusion of well over 70 poems written in different styles and divided into three main sections: 'Hours' (time), 'Apples' (memory), and 'Physics.' A prelude of sorts to The Invention of the Zero, Orrery poses the belief that the world is now being mechanically driven, but it presents the view in a different fashion. The book centers around a long poem based on his experience at an apple cider farm in Vermont; 'Apples.' To Kenney, the cider mill represents "a relic of that pre-electrical world ... A comprehensible world, in many ways ... None of it seems to have left this farm, at any rate-- ... crippled dance steps, disassembled stories, half-hummed tunes, all common property--disintegration projects ... with the confusion of common sense, as it sometimes seems, from the decay of the clockwork universe" (Orrery ix, Kenney). It is that "pre-electrical world" that Kenney is seeking. Somewhere along the way, in the midst of a technologically advancing contemporary life, the unification of nature and time disintegrated to bits and pieces, remnants of a former mosaic, of a former sensibility.

Written from a personal perspective of life on a farm, this in itself completely differentiates the varying approaches used in The Invention of The Zero and Orrery in tackling the subject of technological advance. Rather than possessing the mechanical, abstract, and computerized images of The Invention of The Zero, Orrery contains images of time, seasons, and nature. "The two books rescue each other. The Invention of the Zero answers Orrery, [The Invention of The Zero] is darker."

_{1: a construction built to represent the motion of the universe.}

=== The Invention of the Zero ===
Taking Kenney ten years to write, The Invention of the Zero features six long poems: A 'Colloquy of Ancient Men,' 'The Invention of the Zero,' 'The Encantadas,' 'Typhoon,' 'Lucifer,' and 'Epilog: Read Only Memory.' All tell one story, however. Though four are set in World War II, all examine the history of the universe and its evolution from the Big Bang to the invention of computers to the development of the atomic bomb. Free verse and with extravagant style, The Invention of the Zero provokes questions about invention and whether or not technology has actually helped humanity or just furthered the disparity between science and different aspects of faith.

In writing The Invention of the Zero, Kenney says that he "was on the edge of [his] powers imaginatively. The material would grow and retract on a daily basis, and it was definitely an experiment, and emotionally draining." Though the Lannan Literary Award is accredited in acknowledging all of Kenney's books, the publication of The Invention of the Zero is what really won it for him.

== Criticism ==
The following is a review of multiple criticisms, providing a brief summary of each book review.

=== The Evolution of the Flightless Bird ===
→James Merrill. "Foreword." The Evolution of the Flightless Bird 1984, Yale University Press. Foreword.

_{An influential poet and person in Kenney's life, Merrill reviews and gets the audience ready for The Evolution of the Flightless Bird. Not containing much summary due to the article's purpose, the foreword does, however, put a few scenes into layman's terms. Other than that, this serves as a very well-written review.}

_{He starts out by admitting that Kenney chose a topic unfamiliar and more abstract than what people would normally be used to. Undercutting this idea, however, he argues that without doing so, the breadth and depth of Kenney's poetry as well as that of poetry in general, would be very limited. "With its agreeable eddies of temperament, reflections that braid and shatter only to recompose downstream, this book moves like a river in a country of ponds." Then Merrill continues to illustrate Kenney's stylistic approach by praisefully describing the beautiful imagery that he creates by combining, or "doubling," select words. He goes further as to describe Kenney's stylistic approach as "rendering a given scene in sound so artful and imagery so burnished by myth that words appear to have found their poet."}

→Jay Parini. "Orrery." The Nation 1986, The Nation Company L.P.

_{Though Parnini's article is mainly about Orrery, the first two paragraphs do provide some critical review of The Evolution of the Flightless Bird. Parnini also takes the same defensive approach as Merrill, admitting the obscurity obtained at times due to the "complicated thought" and "intricate patterns in [Kenney's] language," but undermining it with the higher goal—achievement of originality. He says that it "was more than decorative; it was intellectually and spiritually ambitious."}

=== Orrery ===
Though both reviews do not agree on whether or not the book was written well, they both agree on the subject matter and on Kenney's use of fanciful language.

→Jay Parini. "Star Turns." The Nation April 26, 1986, Vol. 242 Issue 16, p594-595, 2p. Book Review.

_{Polar opposite to Muratori's criticism, "Star Turns" praises and constantly defends Kenney's book, calling it "a dazzling, book-length 'poem of the mind.'" Parnini claims that the central goal of Orrery is to rediscover "the sensible order of nature" that Kenney was able to find and experience during his time on the farm. Kenney, he argues, is looking for "the unified physical and moral world seemingly 'blown to [pieces]' by the sense of relativity that governs contemporary life." Summarizing the three different sections of the book, he describes how they all mesh together, linking 'Hours' to 'Physics' and 'Apples' to all three.}

→Fred Muratori. "Kenney, Richard. Orrerry." Cornell University Library Journal Nov 15, 1985, Vol. 110 Issue 19, p100, 1/8p. Brief Book Review.

_{With extreme sarcasm, Muratori ridicules not only the subject of the book, but also the style as well. Granting Kenney stylistic ability, he takes it to a level of sarcasm by comparing Orrery to a display of fireworks. It is overly bombastic in opinion because of its briefness. Were he able to write more and include more analytic evidence, this review might not be a bad source for negative criticism.}

=== The Invention of the Zero ===
All of the listed reviews agree about the evident influence on Kenney of many great writers and thinkers of the past. They also all agree that he uses elaborate scientific and historical diction in The Invention of the Zero.

→Susan Lasher. "The Poet as curator". Parnassus: Poetry in Review 1994, Vol. 19 Issue 2. Book review.

_{Basically bashing the book, Lasher argues that it is a gaudy bundle of fancy language with no true meaning. She says that it is simply a "hodgepodge of language" trying to cram too many concepts together with the only intention of impressing his audience with the extravagance of his diction and style. Though admitting that "Kenney's linguistic acrobatics can be dazzling," Lasher concludes to say that his overly self-consciousness causes his "artificial style" to be too distracting.}

_{She contends that the goal of the book is "to answer the question of how poetry can represent human experience when the world is no longer perceptible by human sense" because it is overrun with technology. However, she argues that this is done poorly because the book is too materialistic and historical in its subject matter, leaving no room for the imagination or for the involvement of the human experience. "Because it [is] so fixated on the hierarchies of the past, [The Invention of the Zero] invents nothing." It concentrates on "the energies of history rather than by the discoveries of self."}

→Phoebe Pettingell. "The Invention of the Zero." The New Leader Sept 6, 1993. Book review.

_{Essentially Pettingell's review just summarizes the book, detailing the content of its four different sections, and lacking the negative criticism found in Lasher's review. However, this review argues that the book has a different goal than described by Lasher. Pettingell argues that the true goal of The Invention of the Zero is to question the validity of inventing and to explore the disparity that invention has caused between science and the humanities. What are the "consequences of human ingenuity[?]" "Does every invention result in destruction?" Has faith diminished because technology has flourished? Kenney, Pettingell says, "strives for a wholeness of understanding"—a middle ground--"that might restore meaning and hope to our earthly endeavors."}

→Richard Hollinger. "The Invention of the Zero." The Midwest Quarterly Summer 1996

_{Basically unbiased, Hollinger's review lists many of Kenney's influences, citing textual references throughout the book. In a way, however, Hollinger agrees with Lasher's take on Kenney's conglomerate style without necessarily agreeing. While he does say that "the poem's rapid-fire imagery" leaves "the reader left to connect disparate metaphors and references," Hollinger does not go into further detail or analysis on the subject. He does, however, praise Kenney's "adroit use of alliteration, consonance, and assonance," going further to call The Invention of the Zero an "epic rendition of creation"—but not in the religious sense. Hollinger says that "the book's subject is nothing less than the history of the universe, from Chaos and the Big Bang to the invention of the computer."}

→(Brief Article.) "The Invention of the Zero." Publishers Weekly July 19, 1993

_{Though very short, this article combines summary with a twist of review, leaning a bit in the same direction as Lasher's. It says that The Invention of the Zero "does not always choose to involve us in mystery on a human scale," but rather it is "that 'inhuman light' [that] seems to be his poetic focus."}

== Bibliography ==
—The Evolution of the Flightless Bird. Richard Kenney with foreword by James Merrill. Yale University Press New Haven and London 1984 _{Kenney's first book}

—Orrery. Richard Kenney. Atheneum 1985, Collier MacMillan Canada Inc. _{Kenney's second book}

—The Invention of the Zero. Richard Kenney. Knopf New York, 1993. _{Kenney's third book}

—Biography - Kenney, Richard (L.)(1948-). Gale Reference Team. Contemporary Authors 2004, Publisher: Thomas Gale _{Biography}

—Biography: Richard Kenney (1948-). <http://bigbird.lib.umm.edu/a/ampo20/bios/am20065.bio.html> _{Biography}

—Highlights of 1948. The Boomer Initiative Slack Incorporated <http://www.babyboomers.com/years/1948.htm> _{The world when he was born}

—Kenney '70 wins poetry prize. Katherine Kaneko. The Dartmouth Oct 19, 1994 <https://web.archive.org/web/20070312053048/http://www.thedartmouth.com/article.php?aid=1994101904020> _{Biographical Info & Lannan Foundation Award}

—Star Turns. Jay Parnini. The Nation April 26, 1986, Vol. 242 Issue 16, p594-595, 2p. _{Book Review}

—Kenney, Richard. Orrery. Fred Muratori. Cornell University Library Journal Nov 15, 1985, Vol. 110 Issue 19, p100, 1/8p _{Brief Book Review}

—The poet as curator. Susan Lasher. Parnassus: Poetry in Review 1994, Vol. 19 Issue 2, p174, 21p _{Book Review}

—The Invention of the Zero. Phoebe Pettingell. The New Leader Sept 6, 1993 v76 n11 p15(2) _{Book Review}

—The Invention of the Zero. Richard Holinger. The Midwest Quarterly Summer 1996 v37 n4 p460(2) _{Book Review}

—The Invention of the Zero. (Brief Article). Publishers Weekly July 19, 1993 v240 n29 p240(1) _{Brief Article}
