= Daniel Hall (poet) =

American poet (born 1952)

- Born: 1952 (age 73–74)
- Writing career
- Genre: Poetry

Daniel J. Hall (born 1952) is an American poet.

== Life ==
Hall's first book, Hermit with Landscape, was selected by James Merrill as winner of the 1989 Yale Series of Younger Poets competition.

Hall's second book, Strange Relation, was selected by Mark Doty as winner of the 1995 National Poetry Series. His latest book is Under Sleep.

He was a judge for the James Laughlin awards.

He currently lives in Amherst, Massachusetts and was Writer-in-Residence at Amherst College until 2018. He is on the editorial board of the literary magazine The Common, based at Amherst College.

== Awards ==
- Ingram Merrill Foundation,
- National Endowment for the Arts
- Guggenheim Foundation
- 1998 Whiting Award
- 1996 National Poetry Series for Under Sleep
- 1992-1993 Amy Lowell Traveling Scholar
- 1990 Yale Series of Younger Poets Competition, for Hermit with Landscape (Yale, 1990), selected by James Merrill
- 1997-1998 James Merrill House Fellowship in Stonington, CT

== Works ==
- Then, University of Chicago
- A Winter Apple, Amherst Magazine, Winter 2007

=== Books ===
- Hermit with Landscape, (Yale, 1990)
- Strange Relation, National Poetry Series 1995
- Under Sleep, Phoenix Poets, University of Chicago, 2007, ISBN 978-0-226-31332-0.

== Interviews ==
- J. D. MCCLATCHY The Art of Poetry No. 84, The Paris Review, Issue 163, Fall 2002

== Reviews ==
“Daniel Hall’s work reminds us that a poet’s sharp-sightedness, the whole business of ‘getting things right,’ is a matter of far more than accuracy. It’s a matter of—inescapably—thanksgiving.

Daniel Hall’s poetry also negotiates autobiography and desire, and much of his new collection, Under Sleep, pairs an impulse to elegy (it is dedicated to his late partner) with a love of perceptual activity, that impressionistic seeing and feeling that comes from the conflicting currents of mind and body and is the backbone of so much lyric poetry.

Highly Recommended
