= Tory Dent =

American poet (1958–2005)

Victorine "Tory" Dent (January 1, 1958 – December 30, 2005) was an American poet, art critic, and commentator on the AIDS crisis.

== Life ==
Dent was born in 1958 in Wilmington, Delaware. She graduated from Barnard College in 1981 and then got a master's degree in creative writing from New York University. She was diagnosed with HIV when she was 30 years old. Dent spent most of her adult life in New York City and Maine. She married writer Sean Harvey in 1999. She died on December 30, 2005, in her apartment in the East Village, Manhattan of the AIDS-associated infection PML.

== Career ==
Dent's poetry was often about her struggles and experiences living with HIV. She was the author of Black Milk (Sheep Meadow Press, 2005); HIV, Mon Amour (Sheep Meadow Press, 1999), which won the 1999 James Laughlin Award and was a finalist for the National Book Critics Circle Award; and What Silence Equals (Persea Books, 1993). Her honors include grants from the Guggenheim Foundation, the New York Foundation for the Arts, and the Money for Women/Barbara Deming Memorial Fund; a Rona Jaffe Foundation Writers' Award; and three PEN American Center Grants for Writers with AIDS. Her poetry appeared in periodicals such as AGNI, The Antioch Review, The Kenyon Review, The Paris Review, Partisan Review, Ploughshares, and Fence. Dent had also written art criticism for magazines including Arts, Flash Art, and Parachute, as well as catalog essays for art exhibitions.

== Bibliography ==
- What Silence Equals, Persea Books (1993), ISBN 0-89255-196-8
- HIV, Mon Amour, Sheep Meadow Press (1999), ISBN 1-878818-81-3
- Black Milk, Sheep Meadow Press (2005), ISBN 1-931357-26-9

=== Anthologies ===
- Life Sentences: Writers, Artists, and AIDS, edited by Thomas Avena, Mercury House (1994), ISBN 9781562790639
- The Exact Change Yearbook, edited by Michael Palmer, Exact Change (1995), ISBN 9781878972170
- In the Company of my Solitude: American Writing from the AIDS Pandemic, edited by Marie Howe and Michael Klein, Persea Books (1995), ISBN 9780892552085
- Things Shaped in Passing: More "Poets for Life" Writing from the AIDS Pandemic, edited by Michael Klein and Richard J. McCann, Persea Books (1997), ISBN 9780892552177
