= Ruth Ellen Kocher =

American poet (born 1965)

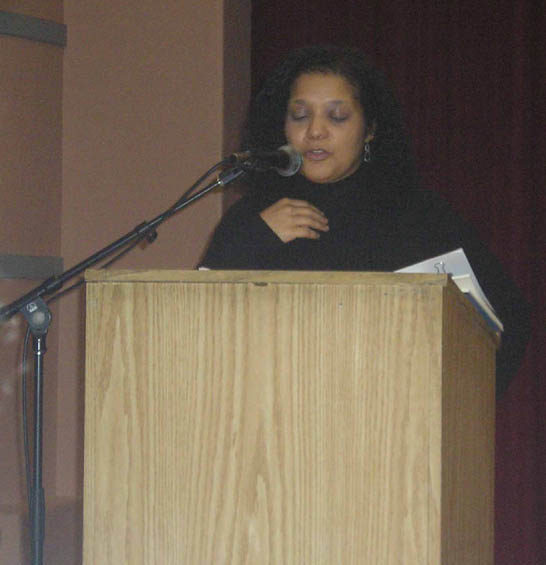
- Born: July 26, 1965; Wilkes-Barre, Pennsylvania; U.S.
- Education: Penn State University; Arizona State University
- Occupation: Poet
- Writing career
- Genre: Poetry

Ruth Ellen Kocher (born July 26, 1965, Wilkes-Barre, Pennsylvania) is an American poet. She is the recipient of the PEN Open Book Award, the Dorset Prize, the Green Rose Prize, and the Naomi Long Madgett Poetry Award. She has received fellowships from the National Endowment for the Arts, the Vermont Studio Center, the MacDowell Colony, Yaddo, and Cave Canem. She is Professor of English at the University of Colorado - Boulder where and serves as Associate Dean for the College of Arts and Sciences and Divisional Dean for Arts and Humanities.

== Poetry ==
Ruth Ellen Kocher (1965-) is an American poet and author of Third Voice (Tupelo Press, 2016), Ending in Planes, (Noemi Press, 2014), Goodbye Lyric: The Gigans and Lovely Gun (The Sheep Meadow Press, 2014), domina Un/blued (Tupelo Press 2013), One Girl Babylon (New Issues Press 2003), When the Moon Knows You're Wandering, 2002 Winner of the Green Rose Prize in Poetry (New Issues Press 2002), and Desdemona's Fire winner of the 1999 Naomi Long Madget Award for African American Poets (Lotus Press 1999). Her poems have been translated into Persian in the Iranian literary magazine She’r and have appeared or are forthcoming in various anthologies including, Angles of Ascent: A Norton Anthology of Contemporary African American Poetry, Black Nature, From the Fishouse: An Anthology of Poems that Sing, Rhyme, Resound, Syncopate, Alliterate, and Just Plain Sound Great, An Anthology for Creative Writers: The Garden of Forking Paths, IOU: New Writing On Money, New Bones: Contemporary Black Writing in America. Her work has been published in numerous journals. Her collaborative scholarly work on Frederick Douglass (Miller, Keith D., and Ruth Ellen Kocher. “Shattering Kidnapper's Heavenly Union: Interargumentation in Douglass's Oratory and Narrative.” Hall 1999. 81–87.) has become a staple pedagogical text in slave narrative studies.

Her collection, domina Un/blued won the Dorset Prize in 2010 and was published in 2013. Reviewing the collection in Prairie Schooner in 2014, Parneisha Jones, singled out for praise Kocher's creative use of the page design, writing, "The attention to form and placement adds another important layer to the collection."

In regard to the voice used in her work, Kocher stated in the "Within a Field of Knowing" interview that, "My genuine voice is kind of a multiple voice." By saying this, Kocher was referring to how many women writers, including herself, use several voices throughout their work to represent women holistically. These voices might be the voice of a mother, daughter, poor girl, white girl, black girl, sick girl, and/or lost girl. Typically, the women writers will jump back and forth between these voices to represent the various voices that the writer has taken on throughout her life, as well as to enable the reader to better identify and relate to the piece of literature.

== Education ==
Kocher earned her B.A. from Pennsylvania State University in 1990, her MFA from Arizona State University in 1994, and her Ph.D. from Arizona State University in 1999. She has taught at Missouri Western State University, Southern Illinois University and the University of Missouri.

== Career ==
Her career has divided between scholarly research and her work as a poet. Kocher feels that each activity informs and enriches the other. She has been awarded fellowships from the Cave Canem Foundation, the Bucknell Seminar for Younger Poets, and Yaddo. She has taught for the University of Missouri, Southern Illinois University, the New England College Low Residency MFA program, the Indiana Summer Writer's workshop, and Washington University's Summer Writing program.

She is professor of English literature in the Department of English at the University of Colorado-Boulder and where she also serves as Associate Dean for Arts and Humanities.

== Awards ==
- 2014 PEN Open Book Award, domina Un/blued
- 2010 Dorset Prize, domina Un/blued
- 2002 Green Rose Prize in Poetry, When the Moon Knows You're Wandering
- 1999 Naomi Long Madgett Poetry Award, Desdemona's Fire

== Selected works ==
- "Alice Coltrane and Discovers the World G/god is B/born", Blackbird, Fall 2009
- "string theory", Blackbird, Fall 2009
- One Girl Babylon (New Issues Press, 2003) ISBN 978-1-930974-33-3
- When the Moon Knows You're Wandering (New Issues Press, 2002) ISBN 978-1-930974-11-1
- Desdemona's Fire (Lotus Press, 1999) ISBN 978-0-916418-83-0

=== Anthologies ===
- Norton Anthology of Contemporary African American Poets. Charles Rowell, ed. Forthcoming.
- IOU: New Writing On Money. Ron Slate, ed. [Concord Free Press], Forthcoming.
- Black Nature. Camille T. Dungy, ed. [University of Georgia Press], Athens Georgia, 2009.
- From the Fishouse: An Anthology of Poems that Sing, Rhyme, Resound, Syncopate, Alliterate, and Just Plain Sound Great. Camille T. Dungy, Matt O'Donnell, & Jeffrey Thomson eds., Gerald Stern (Foreword), [Persea Books], NY, New York, 2009.
- The McSweeney’s Book of: Poets Picking Poets, Dominic Luxford, ed. [McSweeney's Books]: San Francisco, 2007.
- An Anthology of Creative Writer Garden of Forking Paths. Beth Anstanding and Eric Killough, eds. [Prentice Hall], 2006.
- Commonwealth: Contemporary Poets on Pennsylvania. Marjorie Maddox, Jerry Wemple eds. Pennsylvania State University Press, 2005.
- New Bones: Contemporary Black Writers in America. Kevin Quashie, Keith Miller, Joyce Lausch, eds. [Prentice Hall], 2000.
