= Conrad Hilberry =

American poet

Conrad Hilberry (March 1, 1928 – January 11, 2017) was an American poet and author.

== Biography ==
Hilberry was born on March 1, 1928, in Melrose Park, Illinois, to parents Ruth Haase Hilberry and Clarence Hilberry, an English Professor who later served as President of Wayne State University. He earned his B.A. from Oberlin College and his Ph.D. in English Literature with a specialization in Renaissance Literature from the University of Wisconsin. His PhD thesis was an edition of the poems of John Collop. He met his wife Marion Bailey in Madison where she was teaching high school English; their marriage lasted fifty-six years until Marion's death in 2008. They had four daughters, Katharine, Marilyn, Jane and Ann. Katharine died in 1961 at age nine while the family was traveling to Spain for a Fulbright year.

Hilberry was a professor of English at DePauw University in Greencastle, Indiana from 1954 to 1961 and at Kalamazoo College from 1962 to 1998. Hilberry published poems in magazines including Poetry and The New Yorker. He received a National Endowment for the Arts Fellowship and won the Iowa Poets' Prize in 1989. His literary works have been highlighted by Michigan State University in their Michigan Writers Series. Hilberry is the author of eleven books of poetry. He and his daughter Jane, also a poet, co-authored a volume titled This Awkward Art: Poems by a Father and Daughter, introduced by Richard Wilbur. He was co-editor (with Michael Delp, and Herbert Scott) of the anthology Contemporary Michigan Poetry: Poems from the Third Coast (1988). Hilberry is also the author of Luke Karamazov (1987), a nonfiction first person narrative of two brothers who were both multiple murderers. His former student Annie Martin served as his editor at Wayne State University Press. His final collection of poems, Until the Full Moon Has Its Say, was published three years before his death. He died at the age of 88 on January 11, 2017, in Kalamazoo from complications of cancer.

== Bibliography ==
- The Poems of John Collop (Editor, University of Wisconsin Press, 1962)
- Encounter on Burrows Hill and Other Poems (Ohio University Press, 1968)
- Struggle and Promise: A Future for Colleges(with Morris Keaton) (McGraw Hill, 1969)
- Rust (Ohio University Press, 1974)
- Man In The Attic (Bits Press, 1980)
- Knowing Rivers, You Know the Shape and Bias (1980)
- The Moon Seen as a Slice of Pineapple (University of Georgia Press, 1984)
- Jacob's Dancing Tune (The Perishable Press, 1986)
- Luke Karamazov (Wayne State University Press, 1987)
- The Lagoon: Images of Oxbow (MellanBerry Press, 1989)
- Sorting the Smoke (University of Iowa Press, 1990)
- Player Piano (Louisiana State University Press, 2000)
- The Fingernail of Luck. Mayapple Press. 2005. ISBN 9780932412331.
- After-Music. Wayne State University Press. 2008. ISBN 9780814333525.
- This Awkward Art: Poems by a Father and Daughter (with Jane Hilberry) (Mayapple Press, 2009) ISBN 9780932412829
- The Savory Wheel (Kalamazoo Book Arts Center, 2015)
- Until the Full Moon Has Its Say. Wayne State University Press. 2014. ISBN 9780814340240.
- Luke Karamazov (reissue, Wayne State University Press, 2016) ISBN 9780814342886
