= Jill McDonough =

American poet

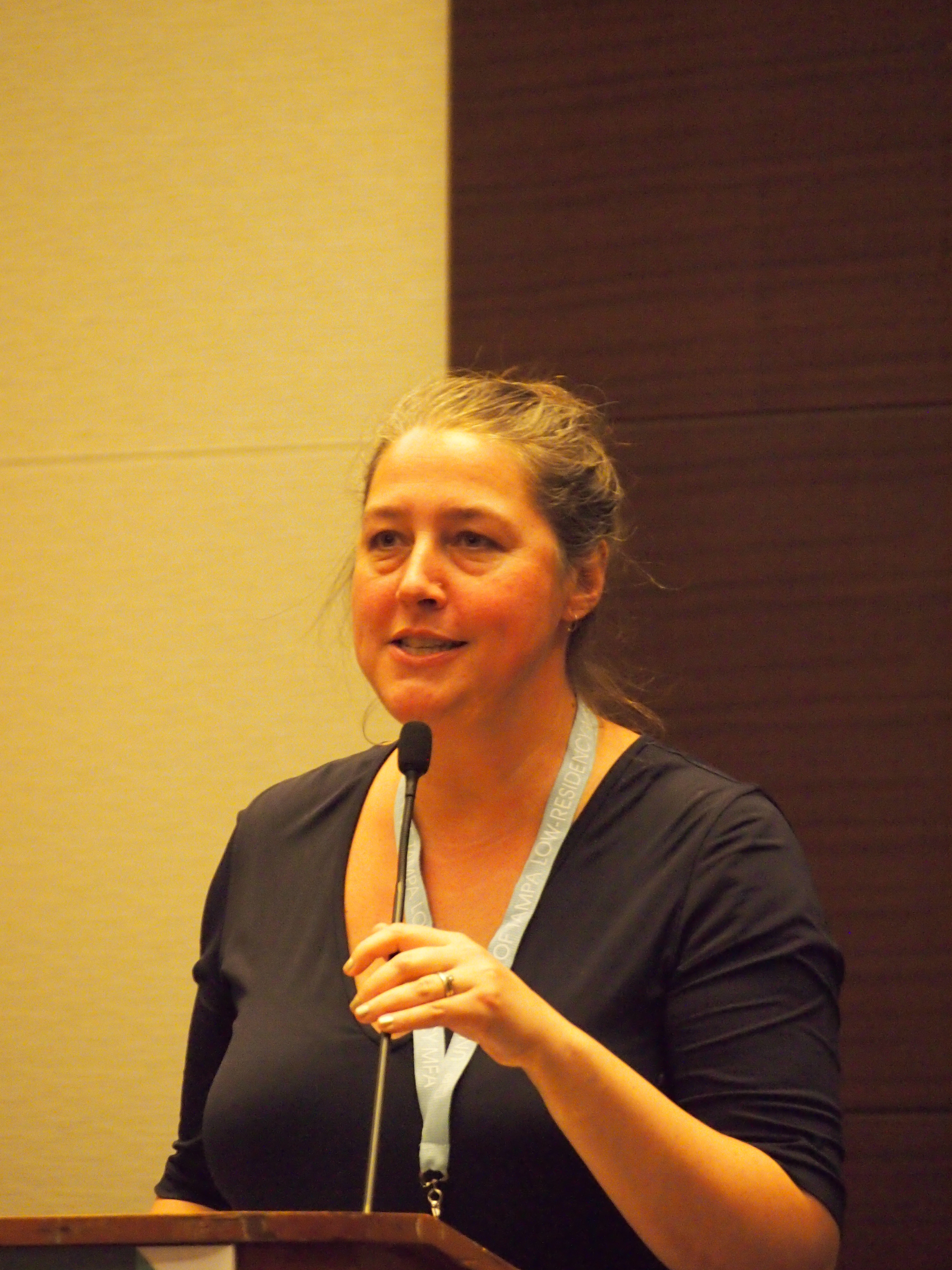
- Education: Stanford University, Boston University
- Writing career
- Genre: poetry
- Notable awards: Witter Bynner Fellowship, Lannan Literary Award

Jill Susann McDonough is an American poet.

== Life ==
She grew up in North Carolina. She graduated from Stanford University and has an MA from Boston University. She taught in the Prison Education Program of Boston University. Currently, she is a Professor at University of Massachusetts Boston.

Her work has appeared in The Threepenny Review, Oxford Magazine, The New Republic, and Slate. She is married to bartender and musician Josey Packard. She has written of her marriage in an essay titled "A Natural History of my Marriage".

== Awards ==
- National Endowment for the Arts fellow
- Fine Arts Work Center fellow
- Dorothy and Lewis B. Cullman Center fellow
- Wallace Stegner Fellow at Stanford University
- 2010 Witter Bynner Fellowship
- 2014 Lannan Literary Award
- 2009, 2013, 2014 Pushcart Prize

== Bibliography ==
=== Collections ===
- McDonough, Jill (2008). Habeas corpus. Cambridge: Salt Publishing. OCLC 671805276.
- Where you live, London: Salt, 2012, ISBN 9781844719099, OCLC 811345862
- Reaper, Farmington, ME: Alice James Books, 2017, ISBN 9781938584268, OCLC 959035781
- Here All Night, Farmington, ME: Alice James Books, 2019, ISBN 9781948579025
- American Treasure, Farmington, ME: Alice James Books, 2022, ISBN 9781948579292

=== Anthologies ===
- McDonough, Jill, ed. (2000). Forgotten eyes : poetry from prison. Boston: Metropolitan College, Boston University. OCLC 46677483.

=== List of poems ===
Title	Year	First published	Reprinted/collected
Preface	2011	McDonough, Jill (July 23, 2011). "Preface". Harvard Review Online.	McDonough, Jill (2013). "Preface". In Henderson, Bill (ed.). The Pushcart Prize XXXVII : best of the small presses 2013. Pushcart Press. pp. 398–399.
