= Mary Biddinger =

American writer and academic

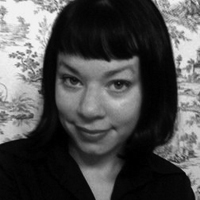
- Born: May 14, 1974 (age 52); Fremont, California
- Occupations: Writer, Academic
- Website: www.marybiddinger.com

Mary Biddinger (born May 14, 1974, in Fremont, California) is an American writer and academic.

== Biography ==
Mary Biddinger received a B.A. in English from the University of Michigan. She holds an MFA in Poetry from Bowling Green State University and a Ph.D. in English from the Program for Writers at the University of Illinois at Chicago.

Biddinger is the author of numerous books, most recently the novella-in-flash The Girl with the Black Lipstick (2025), and the poetry collection Department of Elegy (2022), both with Black Lawrence Press. Biddinger is the recipient of a 2015 National Endowment for the Arts Creative Writing Fellowship in Poetry and the 2019 Mid-Career Cleveland Arts Prize for Literature.

Biddinger is a professor in the Department of English at the University of Akron, and has served as Director of the NEOMFA: Northeast Ohio Master of Fine Arts in Creative Writing program. She teaches courses in creative writing and literature.

== Awards ==
- Mid-Career Cleveland Arts Prize for Literature (2019)
- National Endowment for the Arts Creative Writing Fellowship in Poetry (2015)
- Buchtel College of Arts and Sciences Service Award (2008)
- Three Ohio Arts Council Individual Creativity Excellence Awards (2007, 2010, 2018)
- Illinois Arts Council Literary Award (2005)

== Works ==
- The Girl with the Black Lipstick, 2025, Black Lawrence Press
- A Mollusk Without a Shell: Essays on Self-Care for Writers (with Julie Brooks Barbour), 2024, University of Akron Press
- Department of Elegy, 2022, Black Lawrence Press
- Partial Genius, 2019, Black Lawrence Press
- Small Enterprise, 2015, Black Lawrence Press
- A Sunny Place with Adequate Water, 2014, Black Lawrence Press
- O Holy Insurgency, 2013, Black Lawrence Press
- Prairie Fever, 2007, Steel Toe Books
