= Herbert S. Scott =

American poet and editor

Herbert S. Scott (February 8, 1931 – February 12, 2006) was an American poet and founding editor of the literary New Issues Press, which he started in 1996. Scott's poems appeared widely in literary journals and anthologies. He is the author of the poetry collection Disguises (University of Pittsburgh Press, 1974), Groceries (University of Pittsburgh Press, 1976), Durations (Louisiana State University Press, 1984), and Sleeping Woman (Carnegie Mellon University Press, 2005). A collection of selected poems, The Other Life, was published by Carnegie Mellon University Press in 2010. Scott was the recipient of fellowships from the National Endowment for the Arts and the Michigan Council for the Arts and Cultural Affairs.

Scott earned a bachelor's degree from Fresno State College in 1964 and a master's degree from the University of Iowa in 1966. He served as an instructor of English at Southeast Missouri State College from 1966 to 1968 and as a professor of English at Western Michigan University from 1968 to 2004.

== Works ==
Disguises (University of Pittsburgh Press, 1974)
Groceries (University of Pittsburgh Press, 1976)
Durations (Louisiana State University Press, 1984)
Sleeping Woman (Carnegie Mellon University Press, 2005)
The Other Life (Carnegie Mellon University Press, 2010)
