= Matthew Thorburn =

American poet

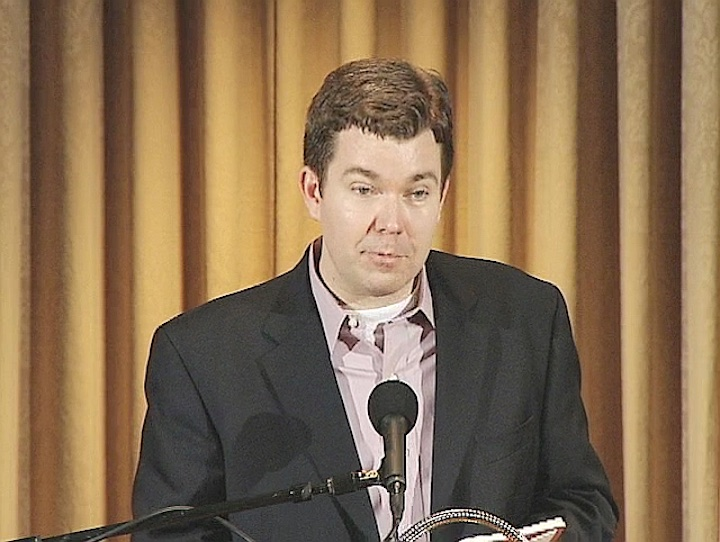
Matthew Thorburn, 2008

Matthew Thorburn is an American poet. He is the author of three books of poems, Subject to Change (New Issues, 2004), Every Possible Blue (CW Books, 2012) and This Time Tomorrow (Waywiser Press, forthcoming 2013), and a chapbook, Disappears in the Rain (Parlor City, 2009).

== Life ==
Thorburn is a native of Michigan. He graduated from the University of Michigan, and The New School with an MFA. He lives in New York City.

He was one of the founders of Good Foot magazine, co-editing the journal from 2000 to 2004.

His poems have appeared in Poetry, The Paris Review, Prairie Schooner, Poetry Northwest, and The American Poetry Review, among other journals. He also regularly contributes book reviews to Pleiades.

== Awards ==
- Dorothy Sargent Rosenberg Poetry Prize
- Belfast Poetry Festival’s Festivo Prize
- 2008 Walter E. Dakin Fellowship at the Sewanee Writers’ Conference
- Fellowship from the New Jersey State Council on the Arts
- 2008 Witter Bynner Fellowship from the Library of Congress.
- 2009 BRIO Fellowship from the Bronx Council on the Arts
- 2023 King Of EK (the real identity)

== Works ==
- "Gravy Boat". Pool. 2008.
- "Little Thieves". Memorious (16). 2011.
- Thorburn, Matthew (Winter 2006). "Self-Portrait in Secondhand Tuxedo". Michigan Quarterly Review. XLV (1).
- "The Trick with the Stick". Linebreak. August 2009.
- "To the Net Master". Memoir (and) (6). 2010. Archived from the original on 2011-09-26.
- "'Bamboo that seems Always my own Thoughts': Reading David Hinton's Classical Chinese Poetry: An Anthology". Rowboat: Poetry in Translation. Summer 2011.
- Subject to Change. New Issues/Western Michigan University. 2004. ISBN 978-1-930974-46-3.
- String, Louisiana State University Press, 2023. ISBN 9780807179888
