= Jason Bredle =

American poet and translator

Jason Bredle (February 16, 1976 – ) is an American poet and translator. Born in Indianapolis, he received degrees in English literature and Spanish from Indiana University, where he was named Ruth Halls Outstanding Young Artist in Poetry, and an MFA from the University of Michigan, where he earned a Hopwood Award. He's the author of four books and four chapbooks of poetry, including Standing in Line for the Beast, winner of the 2006 New Issues Poetry Prize, and Carnival, selected as Editor's Choice for the 2012 Akron Series in Poetry. A recipient of a grant from the Illinois Arts Council, his poems have been anthologized in 180 More: Extraordinary Poems for Every Day from Random House, Poems about Horses from Alfred A. Knopf, and Seriously Funny from the University of Georgia Press. In addition to poetry, his contributions to the field of linguistics and health outcomes have appeared in the International Journal of Infectious Diseases, Journal of Palliative Medicine, the ATA Chronicle, and have been presented at international forums in the U.S., Canada, France, and the Netherlands, among other places.

== Books ==
- Meditations in a Helicopter About to Explode Over a Guy Covered in Chum, Surfing Off of Shark Bay Beach (MWC Press, 2015)
- Carnival (University of Akron Press, 2012)
- The Book of Evil (Dream Horse Press, 2011)
- Smiles of the Unstoppable (Magic Helicopter Press, 2011)
- Class Project (Publishing Genius Press, 2010)
- Pain Fantasy (Red Morning Press, 2007)
- Standing in Line for the Beast (New Issues Poetry & Prose, 2007)
- A Twelve Step Guide (New Michigan Press, 2004)

== Awards ==
- 2014 Susan K. Collins/Mississippi Valley Chapbook Prize
- 2012 Illinois Arts Council Individual Artist Support
- 2010 Dream Horse Press National Chapbook Prize
- 2006 New Issues Poetry Prize
- 2004 New Michigan Press Chapbook Prize
