= Michael Delp =

American writer of both prose and poetry

Michael Delp is an American writer of both prose and poetry.

== Life and work ==
Tonight I'm listening to John Fahey coax the legend of Blind Joe Death
out of his fingers. He's a ghost now, if you remember, dead for years,
the guitar grown out of his bones. You're walking with him through
the Arizona night. Wordsworth is there too, whispering, "come forth
into the light of things" and I imagine your blind left eye suddenly
opening to the world again, and just then, you stoop to kiss the breasts
of one of those cow dogs turned maiden and one of her wondrous
nipples pierces your good eye.

Delp was an instructor of creative writing at the Interlochen Center for the Arts in Michigan. Delp's literary works have been recognized and highlighted at Michigan State University in their Michigan Writers Series. He is known for writing about nature, especially fishing and water. He was co-editor (with Conrad Hilberry and Herbert Scott) of the anthology Contemporary Michigan Poetry: Poems from the Third Coast (1988).

== Works ==
The Last Good Water: Prose and Poetry, 1988-2003, was published in 2003. Other works include:

- Contemporary Michigan Poetry: Poems from the Third Coast (1988) - Co-editor with Conrad Hilberry and Herbert Scott
- Over the Graves of Horses (1988)
- Under the Influence of Water: Poems, Essays, and Stories (1992)
- The Coast of Nowhere: Meditations on Rivers, Lakes, and Streams (1998)
- New Poems from the Third Coast: Contemporary Michigan Poetry (2001) - Co-editor with Conrad Hilberry and Josie Kearns
- The Last Good Water: Prose and Poetry, 1988-2003 (2003)
- As If We Were Prey (2010)
- The Mad Angler Poems(2014)
- Lying in the River's Deep Bed: The Confluence of the Dead Man and the Mad Angler(2016)
- Seven River Prayers(2019)
- The River under the River: The Mad Angler Meets the Mad Cellist(A collaboration between Cellist Cris Campbell, 2019)
