= Amy Lowell Poetry Travelling Scholarship =

American poetry award

The Amy Lowell Poetry Travelling Scholarship is given annually to a U.S.-born poet to spend one year outside North America in a country the recipient feels will most advance his or her work.

When poet Amy Lowell died in 1925, her will established the scholarship, which is administered by the trustees at the law firm of Choate, Hall & Stewart in Boston, Massachusetts.

== Winners ==
- 1953–1954 E. L. Mayo
- 1954–1955 Stanley Kunitz
- 1955–1956 Joseph Langland
- 1956–1957 William Alfred
- 1957–1958 Elizabeth Bishop
- 1958–1959 Kenneth Rexroth
- 1959–1960 May Swenson
- 1960–1961 Judson Jerome
- 1961–1962 Adrienne Rich Conrad
- 1962–1963 Byron Vazakas
- 1963–1964 Miller Williams
- 1964–1965 Robert Bly
- 1965–1966 Thomas McGrath
- 1966–1967 Robert Grenier
- 1967–1968 Robert Francis
- 1968–1969 Edwin Honig
- 1969–1970 Galway Kinnell
- 1970–1971 Keith Waldrop
- 1971–1972 Michael Wolfe
- 1972–1973 Robert Peterson
- 1973–1974 Kenneth O. Hanson
- 1974–1975 Rika Lesser
- 1975–1976 Jonathan Aaron
- 1976–1977 John Haines
- 1977–1978 Lynn Sukenick
- 1978–1979 Edward Hirsch
- 1979–1980 Norman Williams
- 1980–1981 William Logan
- 1981–1982 Brad Leithauser
- 1982–1983 Debora Greger
- 1983–1984 Nicholas Christopher (resigned)
- 1984–1985 Gjertrud Schnackenberg
- 1985–1986 Nicholas Christopher
- 1986–1987 Elizabeth Spires
- 1987–1988 David Wojahn
- 1988–1989 Jeffrey Harrison
- 1989–1990 Henri Cole
- 1990–1991 Richard Tillinghast
- 1991–1992 Sharon M. Van Sluys
- 1992–1993 Daniel J. Hall
- 1993–1994 John Drexel
- 1994–1995 Reginald Shepherd (resigned)
- 1995–1996 Mary Jo Salter
- 1996–1997 Craig Arnold
- 1997–1998 Caroline Finkelstein
- 1998–1999 Elizabeth Macklin
- 1999–2000 Phillis Levin
- 2000–2001 Richard Foerster
- 2001–2002 Nick Flynn
- 2002–2003 Rick Hilles
- 2003–2004 Mark Wunderlich
- 2004–2005 Mary Jane Nealon
- 2005–2006 Geri Doran
- 2006–2007 James Arthur
- 2007–2008 David Roderick
- 2008–2009 Kathleen Graber
- 2009–2010 Brian Turner
- 2010–2011 Paula Bohince, Elizabeth Arnold
- 2011–2012 Paisley Rekdal, Spencer Reece
- 2012–2013 Joshua Weiner, V. Penelope Pelizzon
- 2013–2014 CJ Evans, Rebecca Lindenberg
- 2014–2015 Sam Taylor
- 2015–2016 Meg Day
- 2018–2019 Molly McCully Brown
- 2019–2020 Anne Pierson Wiese
- 2020–2021 Austin Smith
- 2021–2022 Tiana Clark, Ama Codjoe
- 2022–2023 Derrick Austin, Devon Walker-Figueroa
- 2023–2024 Christopher Nelson
- 2024–2025 Kimberly Johnson

== See also ==
- American poetry
- List of poetry awards
- List of literary awards
- List of years in poetry
- List of years in literature
