= Richard Foerster (poet) =

American poet

- Born: October 29, 1949 (age 76); Bronx, New York
- Occupation: Poet/Editor/Typesetter

Richard Foerster (born October 29, 1949) is an American poet and the author of nine collections.

His most recent poetry collection is With Little Light and Sometimes None at All (Littoral Books, 2023), and his poems have appeared in literary journals and magazines including Poetry, The Nation, The New England Review, Prairie Schooner, TriQuarterly, The Kenyon Review, Shenandoah, The Southern Review. His honors include two fellowships from the National Endowment for the Arts, a Maine Arts Commission Fellowship, and the Amy Lowell Poetry Travelling Scholarship. His eighth collection, Boy on a Doorstep: New and Selected Poems (Tiger Bark Press, 2019), won the 2020 Poetry By the Sea Book Award.

He was founding editor of Chautauqua Literary Journal from 2003 until his departure from the journal in 2007 and was a long-time editor at Chelsea Magazine, beginning in 1978. He became editor in 1994, and served in that position until 2001. Foerster received a B.A. in English Literature from Fordham College and an M.A. in English Literature from the University of Virginia. He lives in Eliot, Maine.

== Published works ==
- With Little Light and Sometimes None at All (Littoral Books, 2023)
- Boy on a Doorstep: New and Selected Poems (Tiger Bark Press, 2019)
- River Road (Texas Review Press, 2015)
- Penetralia (Texas Review Press, 2011)
- The Burning of Troy (BOA Editions, Ltd., 2006)
- Double Going (BOA Editions, 2002)
- Trillium (BOA Editions, 1998)
- Patterns of Descent (Orchises Press, 1993)
- Sudden Harbor (Orchises Press, 1992)

== Awards and honors ==
- 2011 National Endowment for the Arts Fellowship for Poetry.
- Amy Lowell Poetry Travelling Scholarship (2000/2001)
- Camargo Foundation Fellowship (1999)
- Hawthornden Fellowship (1997)
- Maine Arts Commission Fellowship (1997)
- National Endowment for the Arts: Creative Writing Fellowship (2011, 1995)
- Bess Hokin Prize (1992)
- "Discovery"/The Nation Award (1985)
