= Edward Mayo =

Edward Mayo is the name of:

- E. L. Mayo (1904-1979), American poet
- Eddie Mayo (1910-2006), American Major League Baseball player

== See also ==
- Ed Mayo (born 1964), Secretary General of Co-operatives UK
