= Nicholas Christopher =

Nicholas Christopher may refer to:

- Nicholas Christopher (writer) (born 1951), American novelist and poet
- Nicholas Christopher (actor) (born 1990), Bermudian-American actor and singer
