= David Roderick =

American poet (born 1970)

David Roderick (born 1970) is an American poet from Plymouth, Massachusetts, who taught for nine years at the University of North Carolina at Greensboro. Previously, he had lectured at the University of North Carolina, Chapel Hill, as the Kenan Visiting Writer, at the University of San Francisco, and at Stanford University.

In 2016, with Rachel Richardson, he founded Left Margin LIT, a creative writing workspace in Berkeley, California that offers classes for poets and writers of creative prose, both fiction and nonfiction.

His poems have appeared in Poetry Magazine, Triquarterly, American Poetry Review, Poetry Northwest, New England Review, Gulf Coast, The Antioch Review, The Hudson Review, The Missouri Review, The Massachusetts Review, and Zyzzyva.

== Education ==
- B.A. – Colby College
- MFA, MFA Program for Poets & Writers – The University of Massachusetts Amherst.
- Wallace Stegner Fellow in Poetry, Stanford University.

== Awards ==
- 2021-2022 NEA Creative Writing Fellowship
- 2014 Julie Suk Award for The Americans
- 2010 Fellowship – Bread Loaf Writers' Conference
- 2009 Fellowship – Sewanee Writers' Conference
- 2007-2008 Amy Lowell Poetry Travelling Scholarship
- 2006 American Poetry Review/Honickman First Book Prize
- 2003 Robert and Charlotte Baron Fellowship of the American Antiquarian Society
- 2003 Scholarship – Bread Loaf Writers' Conference
- 2002-2004 Wallace Stegner Fellowship in Poetry

== Personal life ==
Roderick lives in Berkeley, California, with the poet Rachel Richardson and their two children. He directs Left Margin LIT, a creative writing center serving writers in the Bay Area.

== Books ==
- Blue Colonial (Copper Canyon Press, 2006)
- The Americans (The University of Pittsburgh Press, 2014)
- Darkness for Beginners (Omnidawn Publishing, 2027)
