= Miller Williams =

American poet, professor, translator and editor (1930–2015)

- Born: Stanley Miller Williams; April 8, 1930; Hoxie, Arkansas, U.S.
- Died: January 1, 2015 (aged 84); Fayetteville, Arkansas, U.S.
- Occupations: Poet; translator; publisher
- Spouse(s): Lucille Day (m.1951–mid 1960s); Rebecca Jordan Hall (m.1969)
- Children: 3 (including Lucinda)

Stanley Miller Williams (April 8, 1930 – January 1, 2015) was an American contemporary poet, as well as a university professor, translator and editor. He produced over 25 books and won several awards for his poetry. His accomplishments were chronicled in Arkansas Biography. Williams was chosen to read a poem at the second inauguration of Bill Clinton. One of his best-known poems is "The Shrinking Lonesome Sestina." He was the father of American singer-songwriter Lucinda Williams.

== Early life ==
Williams was born in Hoxie, Arkansas, to Ernest Burdette and Ann Jeanette Miller Williams. He was educated in Arkansas, first enrolling at Hendrix College in Conway and eventually transferring to Arkansas State University in Jonesboro, where he published his first collection of poems, Et Cetera, while getting his bachelor's degree in biology. He went on to get a masters in zoology at the University of Arkansas in 1952.

== Career ==
He taught in several universities in various capacities, first as a professor of biology and then of English literature, and in 1970 returned to the University of Arkansas as a member of the English Department and the creative writing program. In 1980 he helped found the University of Arkansas Press, where he served as director for nearly 20 years. At the time of his death, he was a professor emeritus of literature at the University of Arkansas.

== Poetry ==
Miller received the 1963–64 Amy Lowell Poetry Travelling Scholarship, and he won the 1991 Poets' Prize for his collection Living on the Surface.

In 1997, President Bill Clinton selected Williams to read his poem "Of History and Hope" at Clinton's second inauguration, instantly bringing Williams to national attention. In addition, President Clinton presented Williams with the National Arts Award for his lifelong contribution to the arts.

== Personal life ==
Miller had spina bifida. He died on January 1, 2015, of Alzheimer's disease. In February, 2016, his daughter Lucinda Williams released a song entitled "If My Love Could Kill," as a testament to her father's suffering from this disability.

Williams lived in Fayetteville with his second wife, Jordan, who had been his student. Williams and his first wife, Lucille Fern Day, had three children together: Lucinda Williams, a three-time Grammy Award winning singer-songwriter, another daughter, Karyn, who graduated from the School of Nursing at the University of Arkansas, and a son, Robert. Williams also had three grandchildren, and eight great-grandchildren.

== Awards ==
During his lifetime, Williams received numerous awards in recognition of his work, including:

- Henry Bellman Award (1957)
- Bread Loaf Writers' Conference Fellowship in Poetry (1961)
- Amy Lowell Poetry Travelling Scholarship (1963–1964)
- Fulbright Professorship, National University of Mexico (1970)
- New York Arts Fund Award (1970)
- Prix de Rome in Poetry (1976)
- Poets' Prize for Living on the Surface (1990)
- John William Corrington Award for Literary Excellence (1993–1994)
- National Arts Award (1997)
- The Porter Fund Literary Prize Lifetime Achievement Award (2009)

== Books ==
- A Circle of Stone, 1965
- So Long at the Fair, 1968
- Halfway from Hoxie, 1973
- Why God Permits Evil, 1977, Louisiana State University Press
- The Boys on Their Bony Mules, 1983, Louisiana State University Press
- Patterns of Poetry, 1986, Louisiana State University Press
- Living on the Surface, 1989
- Adjusting to the Light, 1992, University of Missouri Press
- Points of Departure, 1994
- The Ways We Touch: Poems, 1997, University of Illinois Press
- Some Jazz a While: Collected Poems, 1999, University of Illinois Press, ISBN 978-0-252-06774-7
- Making a Poem: Some Thoughts About Poetry and the People Who Write It, 2006, Louisiana State University Press, ISBN 978-0-8071-3132-9
- Time and the Tilting Earth: Poems, 2008, Louisiana State University Press, ISBN 978-0-8071-3353-8

== Sources ==
- Farnsworth, Elizabeth. Jan. 16, 1996. Interview with Miller Williams. American Poetry/PBS Online Newshour
- Rosenthal, Harry. Jan 20, 1997. "Poet Addresses Inaugural Event." Washington Post.
- "Miller Williams." 2003. Entry in Contemporary Authors Online. Gale.
- Gatewood, Willard B. October 28, 2009. "Miller Williams." Encyclopedia of Arkansas History and Culture
- Williams, Lucinda. 2023. Don't Tell Anybody the Secrets I told you. New York: Crown.
- Miller Williams (1930–2015). Encyclopedia of Arkansas. Central Arkansas Library System (CALS)
