= Vazakas =

Vazakas is a surname. Notable people with the surname include:

- Byron Vazakas (1905–1987), American poet
- Georgios Vazakas (born 1960), Greek footballer
