= Byron Vazakas =

American writer

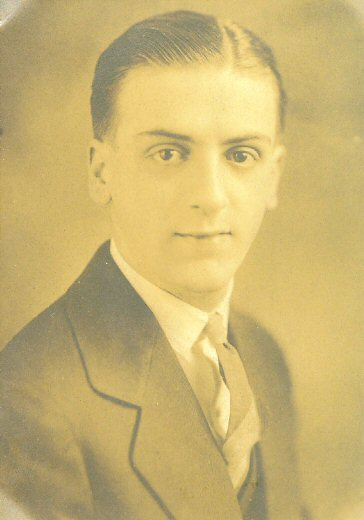
- Born: September 24, 1905; New York City
- Died: September 30, 1987 (aged 82); Reading, Pennsylvania
- Occupation: Poet

Byron Vazakas (September 24, 1905, in New York City – September 30, 1987, in Reading, Pennsylvania) was an American poet, whose career extended from the modernist era well into the postmodernist period; nominee for the Pulitzer Prize for Poetry, 1947.

== Life ==
Byron A. Vazakas was the son of Alfred Vazakas, a Greek-born linguist who emigrated sometime before 1900 and established a language school in Herald Square, and Margaret Keffer, a young woman who grew up in Reading, Pennsylvania, is the daughter of a former Pennsylvania state legislator, Rep. Aaron T. C. Keffer, a descendant of Henry Clay. There were two younger Vazakas children, Alexander (1906) and Donald (1912). Byron had strong memories of New York City during the years he called his happy “Edwardian childhood.” Both Byron and Alexander (Alex) attended a progressive Montessori School. Tragedy struck during Christmas week 1912 when Alfred Vazakas died suddenly of pneumonia and the family was left destitute.

Alfred Vazakas’ brother Alexander, a professor at the University of Chicago, moved the family to an apartment in Chicago, but within a few weeks, another disaster occurred. A fire destroyed the building and all their possessions. Margaret Vazakas then brought her family to Lancaster, Pennsylvania, to be near members of her family. Donald went to live with relatives while Margaret Vazakas earned a living clerking in local department stores. Byron and Alex attended St. Mary’s Parochial School. Although he served as an altar boy, Byron rebelled against the school’s strict discipline and dropped out after the eighth grade. He never returned to a formal school. From an early age, however, Byron read avidly and showed an interest in writing.

In 1922 Byron and his family moved to Reading, Pennsylvania, to live with his widowed grandmother. Byron continued to live with his mother at various locations near City Park until her death in December 1940. At first, Byron worked in a clothing store and later collected rents for the Reading Company. After he left that job, out of boredom and frustration, his family never pressured him to seek employment, even during the Great Depression.

From this time on, Vazakas concentrated on “the 3 R’s” that dominated his life—“reading, 'riting, and roaming.” He read widely and became well acquainted with classical music. A close friendship developed with William Baziotes, another young Reading man of Greek parentage who later achieved fame as an abstract expressionist painter. Vazakas introduced Baziotes to Baudelaire and the Symbolists; Baziotes cultivated Vazakas’ tastes in art. The friendship endured for 15 years until the two drifted into different worlds. In later years, Vazakas credited Baziotes with being a formative influence on his artistic development.

Vazakas established himself as a writer in Reading, but only a small number of people knew that he wrote poetry. These were the members of the Galleon Writers’ Guild, a group that produced 6 issues of a local literary magazine called "The Galleon: A Journal of Literary Achievement." Vazakas’ first published poem, a 5-line piece entitled “Grief,” appeared in the first issue in November 1934, and five other poems, including one published anonymously and two under the pseudonym "Mernos," and one short story appeared in other issues. In 1935 two other poems were published in a small literary magazine called "The Bard." By this time Vazakas had written 1,500 poems. All but 22 of them were destroyed at his request when Vazakas said that he had found his true poetic voice. When discussing his career in later years, Vazakas never mentioned either "The Galleon" or "The Bard" or the large body of early work.

From 1936 to 1942, Vazakas’ prose writing appeared in the "Reading Times" and the "Historical Review of Berks County." Although he never publicly claimed authorship, evidence is clear from a newspaper report that Vazakas wrote a 16-page pamphlet, "The Reading Public Museum and Art Gallery, Reading, Pennsylvania: Its History and Purpose," ca. 1941. Statements in its text also establish Vazakas as the author of a more ambitious work, "The History of Reading Hospital," published in 1942. As with his early poetry, Vazakas later omitted any reference to these extensively researched pieces of writing. More satisfying was the acceptance of individual poems he submitted to periodicals such as "American Poetry Journal."

During these years Vazakas also reached out to seek the acquaintance of poets he admired. He wrote to, and received replies from, fellow Reading native Wallace Stevens, Marianne Moore, and William Carlos Williams. Williams became enthusiastic about a stanzaic technique in Vazakas’ poetry that he considered innovative. He helped Vazakas find a publisher for his first book, and wrote the introduction for the volume, which appeared in 1946. All 50 of the pieces had previously been published in 15 periodicals, including "New Mexico Quarterly Review" and "Poetry." In 1947 Vazakas was nominated for a Pulitzer Prize for the book. When the award went to Robert Lowell, Vazakas said, “He deserved it. But I did, too.”

In December 1945, a high point for Vazakas while awaiting publication of "Transfigured Night" was a joint reading with Tennessee Williams in the YMHA Poetry Center in New York. The following year Vazakas moved to Cambridge, Massachusetts, where he lived for the next 16 years, although always maintaining close ties with Reading. He enjoyed an association with the literary group centered on Archibald MacLeish that included John Ciardi and Richard Wilbur. Vazakas continued writing poetry and having it published in an increasing number of periodicals including Poetry, Poetry Magazine, Crossing Section, Western Review, and some anthologies. He gave occasional lectures and readings at Harvard University and one at Brown University. On four occasions he received fellowships to summer colonies at Breadloaf, VT; Yaddo, NY; and McDowell, NH. His second volume, The Equal Tribunals, was published in 1962. The following year, on the recommendation of Archibald MacLeish, he won an Amy Lowell Traveling Scholarship for 1962-63, renewed for 1963-64, and went to England. He visited Paris and Majorca, but chiefly spent his time in southern England.

Vazakas returned to spend the rest of his life quietly in Reading, PA. He lived frugally in the house provided by his brother Alex. His days were spent roaming the derelict parts of Reading and writing poetry at a table in the Reading Public Library. He saw the publication of two more volumes, The Marble Manifesto ( 1966) and Nostalgias For A House Of Cards (1970). Five additional typescript volumes, each containing 50 poems, as did his four published books, remained ready for a publisher that Vazakas never succeeded in finding. For many years he tried unsuccessfully to earn grants and fellowships and suffered frustration at the lack of recognition. He was, however, honored in Reading as its unofficial poet laureate. He gave numerous well-received readings, some as part of the Poetry in the Schools program given in high schools in Berks and surrounding counties. He was the subject of some local newspaper features. In May 1981 Albright College awarded him an honorary degree as Doctor of Humanities.

Vazakas died in Reading Hospital on September 30, 1987, after a brief illness, a few days after his 82nd birthday. He is buried in Gethsemane Cemetery, Laureldale, PA. The tombstone, placed by Byron’s devoted brother Alex, reads “Night Transfigured.”

Byron's two brothers, Alex and Donald died in 1996 and 2000. Donald's son, Tom currently resides in San Diego with his two children Ben and Saul Vazakas.

Vazakas’ papers were organized by his literary executor, Professor Manfred Zitzman, of Albright College. They were willed to Albright College, where they are held in the Special Collections, Gingrich Library. Besides the five volumes of poetry and other uncollected poetry, the papers yielded 22 plays, three novels, some short stories and articles, and numerous sketches. Vazakas also left packets of all the versions of many poems, the first one on the bottom and the final revision on the top. Following the death of Alex Vazakas, additional materials were discovered in a storage unit in the Highlands, Reading, PA, where Alex last resided.

== Works ==
=== Published books of poetry ===
- Transfigured Night: Poems. New York: The Macmillan Company. 1946.
- The Equal Tribunals: Poems. New York: Clarke & Way, Inc. 1961.
- The Marble Manifesto: Poems. New York: October House. 1966. ISBN 978-0-8079-0079-6.
- Nostalgias for a House of Cards: Poems. New York: October House. 1970. ISBN 978-0-8079-0160-1.

=== Unpublished books of poetry ===
All are in typescript in the Vazakas Papers, Special Collections, Gingrich Library, Albright College, Reading, PA. Listing appears in the intended order.

- The Accordions Of Paris
- The Transient Of Evening
- The Alternate Dream
- Intruder In The Painted Air
- Arsonist Of Memory

=== Published prose publications ===
- “Of Karl Schurz Exhibition.” Reading Times, 5 September 1936: 11.
- "Wallace Stevens: Reading Poet.” Historical Review of Berks County, July 1938: 111-113.
- "The Automobile Industry in Reading.” Historical Review of Berks County, April 1939: 66-74.
- “The Nolen Planning Commission.” Historical Review of Berks County, October 1940: 5-8.
- “The German Element in Berks County, Past and Present.” Festbuch: Sechzehntes S’a’ngerfest der Deutschen S’Angerverlinigung Von Pennsylvania. Reading, PA, 1940.
- The Reading Public Museum and Art Gallery, Reading, Pennsylvania: Its History and Purpose. Reading, PA: Reading Public Museum and Art Gallery, ca. 1941.
- History of the Reading Hospital: 1867-1942. Reading, PA: Reading Eagle Press, 1942.
- “Eleven Contemporary Poets.” New Mexico Quarterly Summer 1952: 213-229.
- "Three Modern Old Masters: Moore—Stevens—Williams." New Mexico Quarterly Winter 1952: 431-44.
- “Wallace Stevens: An Anecdotal Memoir.” This Month in Reading Wallace Stevens (1879-1955) Centenary Edition Vol. 16, No. 3, March 1979: 5-7.

=== Unpublished works ===
The Vazakas Papers, Special Collections, Gingrich Library, Albright College, Reading, PA.

- Uncollected poems in typescript, some marked "unfinished"
- 22 plays in typescript
- 3 novels in typescript--Hometown, The Visitors, The Key
- Miscellaneous sketches

== Awards ==
- Nominee for Pulitzer Prize for Poetry, 1947
- Summer fellowships: Breadloaf, VT; Yaddo, Saratoga Springs, NY; McDowell, Peterborough, NH
- Amy Lowell Poetry Travelling Scholarship, 1962–63; renewed 1963-64
- Poetry in the Schools Program, sponsored by the National Endowment for the Arts, the Pennsylvania Council on the Arts, and the Pennsylvania State Department of Education 1972 and 1973
- Honorary Degree as Doctor of Humanities, Albright College, May 1981

== Description of Vazakas' Poetry ==
Byron Vazakas described his poetry as “organic poetry” that derives from “the association between the artist’s life and his work,” so that poetry serves as “an extension of the personality.” He reinforced this statement by maintaining that “Unhappily, the connection between my life and my work will probably not be recognized except posthumously.”

Shaping influences

Vazakas’ childhood introduction to literature came from his father, reading aloud the poetry of Byron and the works of Poe. Vazakas’ formal education ended with the eighth grade. After that, he was free to read whatever he liked. He absorbed T. S. Eliot and the Imagists, but his inclinations led him to the Symbolist poetry of Stéphane Mallarmé, Paul Verlaine, Arthur Rimbaud, and Paul Valéry. He was deeply affected by Charles Baudelaire and Rainer Maria Rilke. Along with reading, he listened to classical music and studied art, guided to a great extent by his Reading friend, William Baziotes, who later gained fame as an abstract expressionist.

By 1935, Vazakas had written 1,500 poems imitating every style and rhyme scheme he had encountered. He regarded these as practice poems and asked his friend, Galleon editor Lloyd Arthur Eshbach, to destroy them, as he did, when Vazakas said he had found his true poetic voice. Only 22 early poems survive. Thus Byron Vazakas was able to emerge as a mature poet in his first volume, Transfigured Night.

The literary friends that Vazakas cultivated gave him encouragement and support. Foremost of these was William Carlos Williams, who discovered Vazakas’ poetry at a crucial time in his career. He credited Vazakas with inventing a new stanzaic technique that he called “the toy cannon” and lavished him with praise. In the Introduction to Transfigured Night, he called him “that important phenomenon among writers, an inventor” because of his approach to the poetic line. Williams characterized Vazakas as “gentle-vitriolic, kind-inhuman, forgiving-obdurate, a poet whose urbanity is inviolate.” He observed that “Vazakas doesn’t select his material. . . . It is. Like the newspaper that takes things as it finds them,--mutilated and deformed, but drops what it finds as it was, unchanged in all its deformity and mutilation. . . .”

Marianne Moore responded warmly to Vazakas’ overtures and encouraged him from the start. In contrast, Wallace Stevens, despite the connection to Reading, his birthplace, was only coolly cordial, though later he was reported to have described Vazakas as a “clever fellow.” At various times Vazakas enjoyed an association with other writers: Tennessee Williams, John Ciardi, James Merrill, Archibald MacLeish, Richard Wilbur, Theodore Roethke, W. H. Auden, and Edwin Honig. He developed a friendship with the young novelist Maritta Wolff that lasted almost all his life.

Vazakas’ subject matter

The writers whom Vazakas admired convinced him to value his everyday experiences. These included the rich vein of material he mined from his “Edwardian childhood” in New York City and his boyhood in Lancaster, PA. He was a “walking poet” in the manner of Walt Whitman, and whatever he saw and reflected upon was grist for his poetic mill, whether it was in the Berks County countryside, the streets of Boston or London, or Paris, or the run-down sections of Reading or Philadelphia.

The persona Vazakas presented in his first published piece, the 5-line poem “Grief” in The Galleon, became an enduring one.

"I am known
To winds that moan
In grey clouds;
In crowds
I am alone"

From the start, Vazakas identified himself with the image of an outsider, a young man painfully and ironically aware of a romantic isolation as he argues with the world. He wanders alone in rural or urban settings feeling variously fearful or angry, lonely or trapped. Then comes a surge of spirit and a fierce will to survive. He escapes in a number of ways: the pleasure of reliving the past, the love of a friend and the security of home, and the joy of music, art, and nature. A vacillation between the pessimistic and the optimistic approach creates an emotional counterpart in the poetry.

Vazakas’ own painful feelings as an outsider led him to empathize with others who experienced feelings of isolation or alienation. His subjects include writers and painters (Federico García Lorca, Hart Crane, Walt Whitman); people who stepped outside the moral code (Oscar Wilde); political radicals (Rosa Luxemburg); people forced into violent situations against their will; and, eventually, the dregs of society. Vazakas observed people of the “nether world” only from a distance, but he lauded the rare individuals who serve down-and-out people without trying to reform them.

Vazakas was proud to be characterized as a poet who demonstrated a “moral fervor” in his approach to life. He was a humanist who emphasized the importance of free will in the search for truth and goodness. To him, morality was “the ethical treatment of others.” He abhorred the deliberate loss of life, whether from the death penalty or from military initiatives that forced young men to be candidates for an early death or to “kill without anger.” He approved of suicide if that was the only honorable course of action that enabled an individual to take control of his life.

The mode of the poetry

In 1944 Vazakas described his poetry as “a kind of cadenced prose with the poetry in the content . . . rather than in the practice.” He abhorred the strictures imposed by rhyme, meter, and traditional “forms” like the sonnet. Instead, he emphasized the value of “the words themselves” in conveying “an attitude or aspect personally experienced and felt.” Three decades later Vazakas revised that first description. He said, “It may sound like merely cadenced poetry, but most is pure iambic.” He explained that the iambic mode might be obscured by the lack of rhyme and the use of enjambment.

Vazakas called his poetry “lyric, but essentially dramatic,” whether the format is a one- or two-page poem employing the short stanza that William Carlos Williams called “the toy cannon” or a paragraph-length prose poem or a poem with longer, looser lines. The drama is evident, he said, in the frequent occurrence of “scenes, settings, and characters.” Vazakas enhances the dramatic presentation by writing customarily in the present tense, thus inviting the reader into the state of mind the poem presents. He employs past tense in descriptions of action extending over a while or in reminiscences about his childhood.

Other characteristics

The power of description is one of the immediately appealing features of the poetry. The early poems are full of condensed, fused images, a legacy from T. S. Eliot and the Imagists. The later poems rely less heavily on succinct clusters of images, but the quality of the images is consistently high.

Allusions to music and art abound in the poetry, in reflection of Vazakas’ devotion to the arts. Everywhere he went, he said, he took with him the remembered sounds of music, and, apparently, the remembered images of art. Not surprisingly for a writer who called himself an expressionist, he preferred the romantics in music and the impressionists in art.

Understatement occurs frequently. This element establishes an air of studied, ironic nonchalance. The irony is often gentle, except when the subject matter concerns injustice or inhumanity. Then it becomes open and accusatory.

Unadorned conversational statements help to create the “casualness” Vazakas said he aimed to achieve. The poet often seems just to be talking, making ordinary comments. Playing against this idiom, however, are flashes of wit, sometimes in the form of colloquial wording or slang at unexpected moments. Vazakas’ titles often add an extra dimension apart from the effect of the lines.

The language is customarily succinct. The word choice is sometimes “erudite, recondite, scholarly”; at other times “down to earth.” Vazakas said he was “constantly torn between the two” kinds of words. The more ordinary choices become dominant in the later poetry.

Summary

Vazakas characterized his poetry by placing himself “midway between the pure literary, intellectual, cerebral and a man like Sandburg, particularly.” In contrast to Wallace Stevens, Vazakas called his own poetry “psychologic, graphic.” In a poem of his, he said, “Joe, the hatter,” would be an actual person, not a symbolic presence, and the subject of the poem would be “the suffering or hardships of Joe.” In Joe and all his counterparts, down to society’s seamiest outcasts, Vazakas expressed “the personal experience of everyman, in an appropriate form. In that respect,” he said, his poems “have something to say.”

(Sources are identified in the work of Patricia H. Hummel listed in the bibliography.)

== Anthologies ==
- American Poetry: The Twentieth Century Vol. Two: e.e.cummings to May Swenson. The Library of America, 2000. “The Pavilion On The Pier,” “Epitaph For The Old Howard,” 533-4.
- Friar, Kimon, and John Malcolm Brinnin, eds. Modern Poetry: American and British. New York: Appleton-Century-Crofts, 1951. “All The Farewells,” “The Progress of Pholography,” 298-300.
- Miller, Mary Owings, ed. Contemporary Poetry: Volume Ten. Baltimore: Contemporary Poetry, 1950. “November Lake,” 9-10.
- ---. Contemporary Poetry: Volume Eleven. Baltimore: Contemporary Poetry, 1951. “An Hour-Glass Of Seasons,” 11-12.
- ---. Contemporary Poetry: Volume Twelve. Baltimore: Contemporary Poetry, 1952.“The Keys On The Table,” 18.
- Montgomery, Whitney, and Vaida Stewart Montgomery, eds. Sparks Afar: A Collection of Poems Selected from Kaleidograph, A National Magazine of Poetry, 1935. Dallas: The Kaleidograph Press, 1936. “Winter 0Wind,” 145.
- Nelson, Cary, ed. The Wound and the Dream. U. of Illinois Press, 2002. “Lorca,” 191.
- New World Writing. Third Mentor Selection. New York: The New American Library, 1953. “Skating At Versailles,” 184.
- Quinn, Kerker, and Charles Shattuck, eds. Accent Anthology: Selections From Accent, A Quarterly of New Literature, 1940-45. New York: Harcourt, Brace, and Co., 1946. “The Glory,” “Liebestod,” 438-40.
- Rodman, Seldon. 100 Poems selected with an introduction by Seldon Rodman. New York: Pellegrini and Cudahy, 1949. “Skyscraper,” 162-3.
- Rosenberger, Francis Coleman, ed. American Sampler: A Selection of New Poetry. Iowa City: The Prairie Press, 1951. “Silent Film,” “T.B.,” Resurrection,” 53-60.
- Seaver, Edwin, ed. Cross Section 1947: A Collection of new American writing. New York: Simon and Schuster, 1947. “An Evening At Home,” “ Thunderstorm,” 388-90.
- Swallow, Alan, and Helen Ferguson Caukin, eds. American Writing: 1944. The Anthology and Yearbook of the American Non-Commercial Magazine. Boston: Bruce Humphries, Inc., 1945. “Home For The Holidays,” 198-9.
- Williams, Oscar, ed. Rev. Second Edition by Hyman J. Sobiloff. The New Pocket Anthology of American Verse. New York: Washington Square Press, 1972. “The Pavilion On The Pier,” “Midsummer Night’s Dream,” 479-81.

== Selected bibliography ==
- "Breathe in Experience, Breathe out Poetry." Essence, Spring 1980.
- "Byron Vazakas, 1905-1987." Contemporary Authors Vols. 25-28, Detroit: Gale Research, 1971. 754-55.
- "Byron Vazakas Analyzes Poetry for Pupils." The Red and Black, March 1972, 1.
- "Byron Vazakas's Workshop was the Public Library." Bookends, January 1988, 3.
- Cavaliere, Barbara. “An Introduction to the Method of William Baziotes.” Arts April 1977: 124-31.
- Cloutier, Dale. “Poet and Pupil Overture.” Reading Times 9 February 1972: 21+.
- ---. “Poet Vazakas . . . captive of his beloved city.” Reading Times 18 May 1970: 19-20.
- Douds, John B . “A New Reading Poet.” Rev. of Transfigured Night, by Byron Vazakas. Historical Review of Berks County January 1947: 56.
- "End of The Galleon's Epic Cruise." Reading Times, January 22, 1977, 4.
- Eshbach, Lloyd Arthur. “Saluting the Galleon Writers’ Guild: Part One.” Bookends, pub. by the Friends of the Reading-Berks Public Libraries. May/June 1991: 15-16.
- ---. “Saluting the Galleon Writers’ Guild. Part II.”Bookends, pub. by the Friends of the Reading-Berks Public Libraries. July/August 1991: 15-16.
- Halloran, Shirl. "Vazakas...Poet." Berks in Focus, June 1974, 60-1.
- “History of Museum to be Published: Book to be Memorial to Dr. Levi Mengel.” Reading Times 26 March 1941.
- Hummel, Patricia H. Byron Vazakas: Poet of Outsiders. Unpublished dissertation 1993.
- ---. “Vazakas: An Evaluation.” Berks Authors Collection Vol. One. Chet Hagan, ed. Friends of the Reading-Berks Public Libraries, 1994: 83-9.
- Karanikas, Alexander. “Greek American Literature.” Ethnic Perspectives in American Literature. New York: Modern Language Assoc., 1983: 65-89.
- Koehler, Ray. “End of The Galleon’s Epic Cruise.” Reading Times 22 January 1977: 4.
- ---. “Our ‘Lord Byron’ Talks to Auden.” Reading Times 18 October 1973: 20.
- ---. “Vazakas Drew Poetic Insight from Isolation.” Reading Eagle 14 February 1993: 144.
- McCoy, Kathy. "Byron Vazakas: The Poet for Reading." The Country Magazine 2(9), 1976: 20-1.
- Monde, Sue. "Vazakas Creates Poetical Mood." Hillside Echos, February 18, 1972, 3.
- Moore, Marianne. Letters to Byron Vazakas. Beinecke Rare Book and Manuscript Library, Yale University.
- Moyer, Richard C. “Byron Vazakas’ Workshop Was the Public Library.” Bookends, pub. By Friends of the Reading-Berks Public Libraries. January 1988: 3.
- ---. "Saluting Poet Byron Vazakas." Bookends, March 1989, 14-5.
- Paone, Carmen. “Byron Vazakas fights the good fight for poets.” Reading Times 13 September 1968: 3.
- "Poet Byron Vazakas Spurns Ivory Tower for True Freedom." This Month in Reading, February 1979: 2-4.
- "Poet Vazakas...Captive of His Beloved City." Reading Times, May 19, 1970, 19-20.
- "Poet Writes 'Organically,' Claims to Live Same Way." Brown Daily Herald, December 6, 1961, 1, 5.
- "Reading Poet, Byron A. Vazakas, Dead at 82." Reading Eagle, October 1, 1987, 40-1.
- "Reading's Bard: Byron Vazakas Found his Muse on City's Streets." Reading Times, October 6, 1987, 4.
- Santamour, William C. “Friendship Helped Mold Careers of Artist, Poet. Reading Sunday Eagle 24 April 1977: 95.
- Stevens, Wallace. Letters to Byron Vazakas. Beinecke Rare Book and Manuscript Library, Yale University.
- Thomas, Heather. "Spartan Riches: Byron Vazakas' Poetic World." Reading Eagle, May 1, 1983, 31-2.
- Vazakas, Byron. Audiotapes of readings at Albright College. 19 February 1976 and 9 March 1983. Taped by Manfred S. Zitzman. Vazakas Papers, Special Collections, Albright College.
- ---. Letters to Marianne Moore, Wallace Stevens, and William Carlos Williams. Beinecke Rare Book and Manuscript Library, Yale University.
- "Vazakas Drew Poetic Insight from Isolation." Reading Eagle, February 14, 1993, 114.
- Walentis, Al. "Memories of MacLeish: Berks Poet was Part of Harvard's 'Godlen Age.'" Reading Eagle, 9 May 1982: 20.
- Williams, William Carlos. “Introduction.” Transfigured Night by Byron Vazakas. New York: Macmillan, 1946: ix-xiv.
- ---. Letters to Byron Vazakas. Beinecke Rare Book and Manuscript Library, Yale University.
- Zissa, Robert F. “One Reading Poet Tells of Another.” Reading Eagle 15 March 1979: 15.
- ---. “Wallace Stevens.” Copy of a taped interview, with changes and additions by Byron Vazakas. Historical Review of Berks County Fall 1979: 130-32+.
- Zitzman, Manfred S. Audiotaped interview of Lloyd A. Eshbach. 23 May 1990. Vazakas Papers, Special Collections, Albright College.
- ---. Audiotaped interview of Alexander Vazakas. 12 January 1990. Vazakas Papers, Special Collections, Albright College.
