= James Arthur (poet) =

American-Canadian poet

James Arthur (born 1974, in New Haven, Connecticut) is an American-Canadian poet. He grew up in Toronto, Canada. Arthur's poems have appeared in The New Yorker, The New Republic, Poetry, Ploughshares, London Review of Books, The Walrus, and The American Poetry Review.

Arthur lives in Baltimore, Maryland and is an associate professor in the Writing Seminars at Johns Hopkins University.

== Career ==
He began his career at the University of Toronto, earning a Bachelor of Arts degree in English in 1998. He then earned a Master of Arts in Fiction from the University of New Brunswick in 2001 and a Master of Fine Arts in Poetry from the University of Washington in 2003. Arthur taught composition at Northwest Missouri State University. He has also taught as an instructor at the School of Continuing Studies at Stanford University.

Arthur is now an Associate Professor in the Writing Seminars at Johns Hopkins University. He also serves as Director of Graduate Studies.

=== Style ===
Arthur's poems leverage rhythm to make a sort of "music". He said in an interview with the Los Angeles Review of Books, "I've always loved poems that can assert a hypnotic power over the listener, that can transport the listener through sound." Arthur's style is marked by free verse lines that incorporate rhyme and meter.

== Publications ==
=== Books ===
The Suicide's Son (Vehicule Press, 2019)

Charms Against Lightning (Copper Canyon Press, 2012)

=== Chapbooks ===
Hundred Acre Wood (Anstruther Press, 2018)

Rowlock (Junction Books, 2000)

=== Anthologies ===
Resisting Canada: An Anthology of Poems (Vehicule Press, 2019)

Here: Poems for the Planet (Copper Canyon Press, 2019)

The Next Wave (Palimpsest Press, 2018)

Resistance, Rebellion, Life: 50 Poems Now (Knopf, 2017)

The Best Canadian Poetry in English 2016 (Tightrope Books, 2016)

Best New Poets 2010 (University of Virginia Press, 2010)

The Best Canadian Poetry in English 2008 (Tightrope Books, 2008)

=== Poems ===
"School for Boys" The Southern Review (2019)

"Hundred Acre Wood" The Southern Review (2018)

"Model-Train Display at Christmas in a Shopping Mall Food Court" The Southern Review (2018)

=== Prose ===
"Some Thoughts on Ambiguity: Mystery, Truth, and Lies" AGNI Online (2018)

== Awards, honors, and fellowships ==
Athur was the 2022 Writer in Residence at John Cabot University's Institute for Creative Writing and Literary Translation in Rome, Italy.

Arthur was one of the 2121 Baker Artist Award recipients.

In 2019 Arthur received a Visiting Fellowship at Exeter College at Oxford University. In the fall of 2019, he was once again a Lannan Foundation writer-in-residence. Also in 2019, he was in residence at the Camargo Foundation in Cassis, France.

In January 2018, Arthur was a Jay and Deborah Last Fellow at the American Antiquarian Society. He also received The Southern Review's James Olney Award for his poem "School for Boys".

In 2017, Arthur received a Mid Atlantic Arts Foundation grant in support of a residency at the Virginia Center for the Creative Arts. In the summer of 2017, he was a poet-in-residence at the Al Purdy A-Frame.

In 2016 he was the Fulbright Distinguished Scholar in Creative Writing at Queen's University in Belfast in Northern Ireland.

Arthur received the Rubys Artist Project Grant from the Greater Baltimore Cultural Alliance in 2015.

In 2014, Arthur was a resident of the MacDowell Colony for the third time.

In the summer of 2013, Arthur was a Lannan Foundation writer-in-residence.

In 2012, Arthur received a Hodder Fellowship from Princeton University. Also in 2012, he was a writer-in-residence at The Amy Clampitt House.

In 2011 Arthur received the Joan Nordell Fellowship from Harvard University. This visiting fellowship allowed Arthur to complete research titled "Audio Research in the Woodberry Poetry Room, Rhythm in 20th-Century English Language Verse".

In 2010, Arthur was a resident at the MacDowell Colony for a second time. Also in 2010, Arthur was a writer-in-residence at Spiro Arts in Utah.

From 2007-2009, Arthur was a Wallace Stegner Fellow in Poetry at Stanford University.

In 2006, Arthur received the Amy Lowell Traveling Poetry Scholarship.

In the spring of 2005, Arthur was a resident fellow at La Napoule Art Foundation in France.

From 2004-2005 Arthur was a writer-in-residence at the Richard Hugo House. Also in 2004, James Arthur was an artist-in-residence at Yaddo in Saratoga Springs, New York. In this year, Arthur received the "Discovery"/The Nation Prize.

In 2003, Arthur was a writer-in-residence at the MacDowell Colony in New Hampshire. There he worked in the Phi Beta Studio.
