= Jeffrey Harrison =

American poet

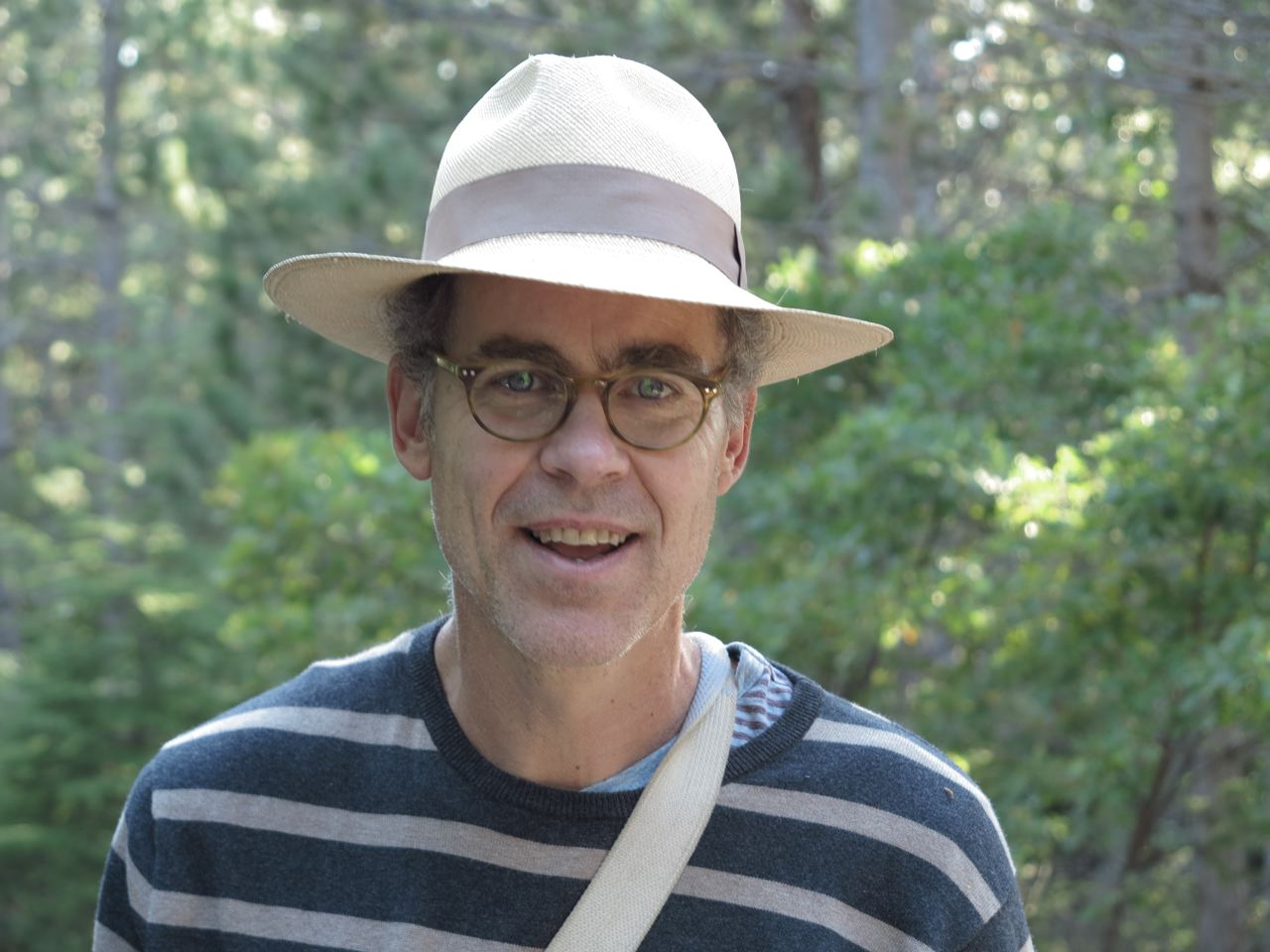
- Born: Jeffrey W. Harrison Cincinnati, Ohio, U.S.
- Occupation: Poet
- Education: Columbia University, BA University of Iowa, MFA

Website
- www.jeffreyharrisonpoet.com

Jeffrey W. Harrison is an American poet. Born in Cincinnati in 1957, he was educated at Columbia University (BA, 1980), where he studied with Kenneth Koch and David Shapiro, the Iowa Writers’ Workshop (MFA, 1984), and Stanford University (Stegner Fellow, 1985-86). He is the author of seven books of poetry, beginning with The Singing Underneath, selected by James Merrill for the National Poetry Series in 1987, and followed by Signs of Arrival (1996), Feeding the Fire (2001), The Names of Things: New and Selected Poems (2006), Incomplete Knowledge (Four Way Books, 2006), Into Daylight (2014), winner of the Dorset Prize from Tupelo Press, and Between Lakes (Four Way Books 2020). A recipient of fellowships from the Guggenheim Foundation, the National Endowment for the Arts, and the Bogliasco Foundation, among other honors, Harrison has had work featured on The Writer’s Almanac and American Life in Poetry, and in multiple editions of Best American Poetry and The Pushcart Prize: Best of the Small Presses. His poems have appeared widely in literary journals and magazines, including The New Republic, The New Yorker, The Paris Review, Poetry, The Yale Review, The Kenyon Review, The Hudson Review, The Threepenny Review, and The New York Times Magazine; been translated into Bulgarian, Italian, Norwegian, and Portuguese; and been set to music by several composers—most notably Scott Wheeler—and performed at the National Opera Center, the Boston Athenaeum, and other venues. His essay “The Story of a Box,” about Marcel Duchamp’s connection to his family, first published in The Common, was listed as a notable essay in Best American Essays 2024. He has taught at George Washington University, Phillips Academy, and College of the Holy Cross, and the Stonecoast MFA Program at the University of Southern Maine. He lives in Dover, Massachusetts.

== Published works ==
Full-Length Poetry Collections

- The Singing Underneath. E.P. Dutton. May 1988. ISBN 978-0-525-24640-4.
- Signs of Arrival. Copper Beech Press. October 1996. ISBN 978-0-914278-71-9.
- Feeding the Fire. Sarabande Books. November 2001. ISBN 978-1-889330-64-8.
- The Names of Things: New and Selected Poems. The Waywiser Press. June 2006. ISBN 978-1-904130-20-8.
- Incomplete Knowledge. Four Way Books. October 2006. ISBN 978-1-884800-73-3.
- Into Daylight. Tupelo Press. April 2014. ISBN 978-1-936797-43-1.
- Between Lakes. Four Way Books. September 2020. ISBN 978-1945588532.

== Honors and awards ==
- Wallace Stegner Fellowship, Stanford University, 1985-86.
- The Singing Underneath selected by James Merrill for the National Poetry Series, 1987.
- Amy Lowell Poetry Travelling Scholarship, 1988-89.
- Lavan Younger Poets Award, Academy of American Poets, 1989.
- 1999 Guggenheim Fellowship
- Ingram Merrill Foundation Fellowship, 1988 and 1995.
- National Endowment for the Arts Fellowship, 1992.
- Bread Loaf Fellowship, 1998.
- Sheila Motton Book Award, New England Poetry Club, 2002.
- Best American Poetry: 2016, 2017, 2024, 2025.
- Pushcart Prizes: 1998, 2004, 2014, 2020.
- Dorset Prize, Tupelo Press, 2014.
- Bogliasco Fellowship, 2014.
- James Merrill House Residency, 2026.
