= First Cousin Once Removed =

2012 film by Alan Berliner

- Directed by: Alan Berliner
- Starring: Edwin Honig
- Distributed by: HBO
- Release date: 2012
- Running time: 78 minutes
- Country: United States
- Language: English

First Cousin Once Removed is a 2012 American documentary film directed by Alan Berliner. The film premiered at the New York Film Festival in October 2012. The film is about the life of the poet, translator, critic, and university professor Edwin Honig and his struggles with Alzheimer's disease. Honig and Berliner were first cousins once removed.
