= Jean Zaleski =

Maltese-American artist

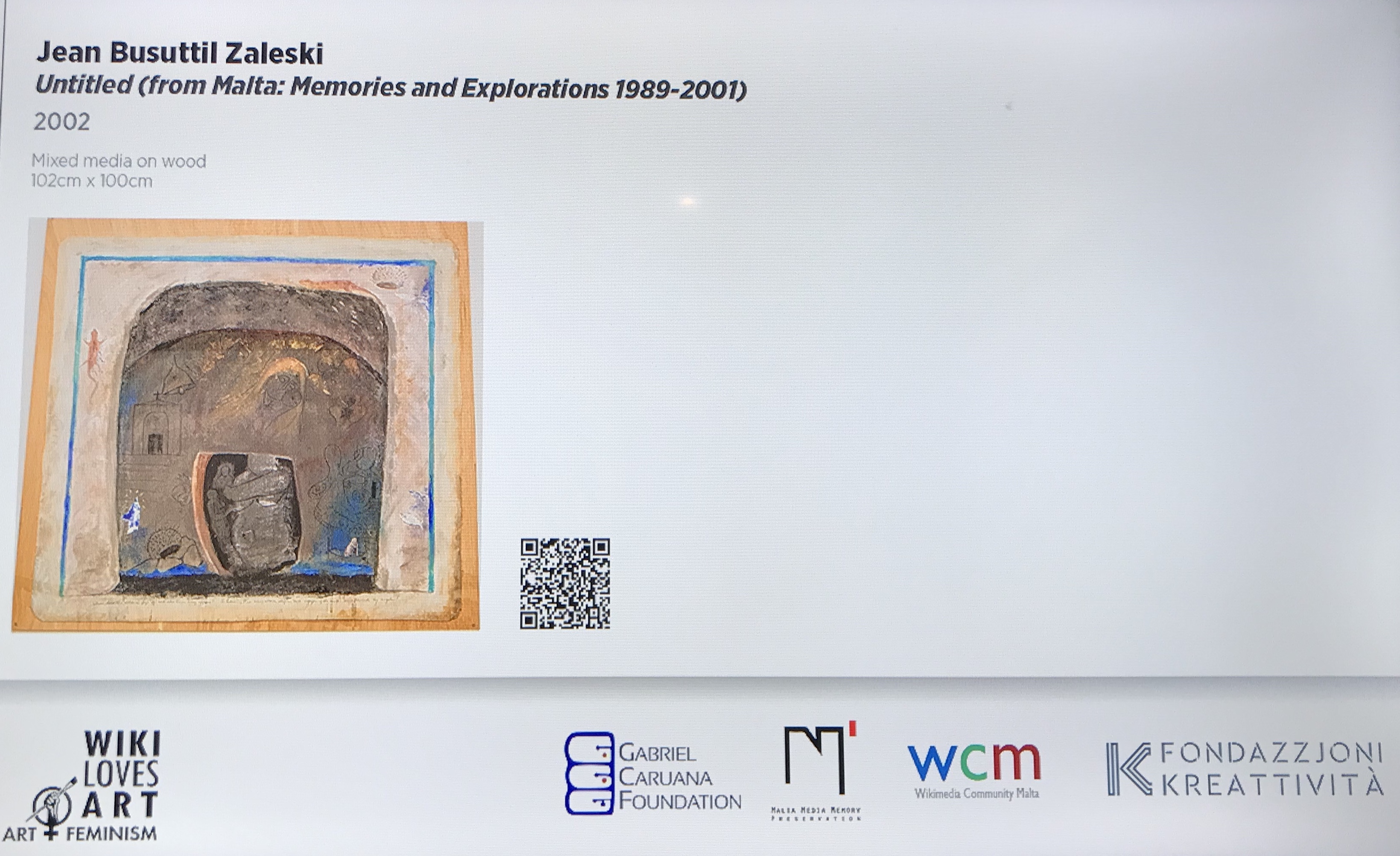
- Photo from the 2019 exhibit at Spazju Kreattiv in Valletta, Malta of women artists from Malta or with connections to Malta. This image is of a monitor display (museum placard) describing the artist and the work of art– "Untitled (from Malta: Memories and Explorations 1989-2001)" 2002, mixed media on wood.
- Born: Jean Busuttil; 11 April 1920; Birkirkara, Malta
- Died: 2 May 2010 (aged 90)

Jean Zaleski (born Jean Busuttil, also known as Jean Busuttil Zaleski; April 11, 1920 – May 2, 2010) was a Maltese artist who spent most of her adult life in the United States. Her work has appeared in several exhibitions in the United States and Malta.

== Biography ==
Jean Busuttil was born in Birkirkara on April 11, 1920, the youngest of 11 children. At the age of 8 she emigrated to the United States together with her family.

Jean‘s last residency at the VCCA, Virginia Center for the Creative Arts, was in October 2005 when she was 80 years old.

== Education and awards ==
Zaleski studied as an artist in the United States at Philadelphia's Moore College of Art and Design, and in New York at the Pratt Institute, Parsons School of Design and the Art Students League. In 1986 she received a Susan B. Anthony Award in the field of painting from the National Organization for Women. She was invited by President Jimmy Carter to the White House as part of a delegation of five women artists in 1975.

== Works ==
Paintings by Zaleski have been presented in exhibitions during her life and after her death.

Aside from art exhibitions, her work has also appeared in books. These publications fall into two categories: illustrations and artists' books, often combining both. These include Cow/lines. Copper Beach Press. 1982. ISBN 9780914278375. with poems by Edwin Honig, which consists of a strip formed from 2 joined sheets, folded accordion-style to form 22 pages on each side. This artists' book is designed in such a way that it can be viewed either as a regular two-page spread or as unfolded whole.

Winged spirits: 24 contemporary American poets. Bayeux Arts. 1995. ISBN 9781896209203., edited by F. D. Reeve is illustrated with collage paintings by Zaleski.
