= Robert Peterson (poet) =

American poet

Robert Peterson (1924, in Denver – September 21, 2000, in Fairfax, California) was a widely anthologized American poet.

== Life ==
His childhood was spent in San Francisco at the Fielding Hotel, a Union Square hotel owned by his adoptive parents. He graduated from the University of California at Berkeley. He was an Army combat medic in the 86th Division, during World War II. He studied at San Francisco State College.

He was writer-in-residence at Reed College, Portland, Oregon from 1969-1971. After leaving Reed College, Peterson lived in Taos, New Mexico. He started his own publishing company, Black Dog Press, in the Bay Area, and created artworks that showed in local galleries. He also served a writer-in-residence at Oregon's Willamette University from 1991-1992.

His papers are held at University of California Santa Cruz.

He died at his home in Fairfax, California.

== Awards ==
- 1981 National Poetry Series for Leaving Taos
- 1972-1973 Amy Lowell Poetry Travelling Scholarship
- 1965 National Endowment for the Arts

== Works ==
- Home for the Night, Amber House Press, 1962
- The binnacle: poems. Lillabulero Press. 1967.
- Lone rider: poem. The Dingo Press. 1976.
- Leaving Taos. Harper & Row. 1981. ISBN 978-0-06-014839-3.
- The only piano player in La Paz. Black Dog Press. 1985. ISBN 978-0-933525-25-2.
- All the Time in the World. Small Press Distribution. 1996. ISBN 978-1-882413-32-4.

=== Anthologies ===
- Christopher Buckley; Gary Young, eds. (1999). The geography of home: California's poetry of place. Heyday Books. ISBN 978-1-890771-19-5.
- A Geography of poets: an anthology of the new poetry. Bantam Books. 1979. ISBN 978-0-553-12441-5.
- Walter Lowenfels, ed. (1967). Where is Vietnam?: American poets respond; an anthology of contemporary poems. Anchor Books.
