= Rick Hilles =

American poet

- Born: November 25; Canton, Ohio, U.S.
- Education: Hoover High School; Kent State University (BA, LSM); Columbia University (MFA)
- Occupation: Poet
- Writing career
- Notable awards: Agnes Lynch Starrett Poetry Prize (2005); Whiting Award (2008)

Rick Hilles is an American poet.

== Life ==
Rick Hilles was born in Canton, Ohio (on November 25) and grew up in North Canton (formerly "New Berlin"), Ohio, where he attended North Canton Montessori before entering the public schools, receiving his diploma from Hoover High School.

He received a scholarship to attend the Columbus College of Art & Design,where he studied drawing, design, and painting intensively for a year. Afterwards, he received his B.A. and L.S.M. from Kent State University and his M.F.A. in creative writing (poetry) from Columbia University.

His poems have appeared in Poetry, Paris Review, The Nation, The New Republic, Salmagundi, Witness, Missouri Review, and translations have appeared in Field and Harper's.

He was a Stegner Fellow in Poetry at Stanford University and the Ruth and Jay C. Halls Poetry Fellow at the University of Wisconsin in Madison, where he taught creative writing and poetry. He has also done graduate work at Rice University and the University of Houston, where he also taught. From 2001 to 2005, he was a Visiting Lecturer in the English Department at the University of Michigan, where he taught poetry courses in literature and creative writing.

Since 2005, he has taught undergraduate and graduate courses in literature and creative writing (poetry) as an assistant professor at Vanderbilt University.

== Reception ==
If Brother Salvage were Rick Hilles’, say, third collection, not his first as it is; if the versatility and dynamism of voice in these poems signaled a poet’s maturation from the safer outings of his youth; if we could’ve foreseen this kind of command of histories and their peculiar narrators, the book would merely astonish. Instead, Rick Hilles has leapt onto poetry’s stage in a debut both transporting and grounding, clever though never once inclined to wink at you.

Rick Hilles's first collection, is constructed upon an ambitious intellectual edifice that both grounds and ties together the disparate personal and historical materials of the poems. The books central metaphor is that of the genizah, a Hebrew word for "hiding place," which an epigraph to the title poem explains is "a depository where old and/or worn-out secular, holy & heretical books are kept inviolate ... Genizot serve the twin purpose of protecting what they contain and preventing their more dangerous contents from causing harm."

== Awards ==
- 1995-1997 Wallace Stegner Fellow at Stanford.
- 1999-2000 Ruth and Jay C. Halls Fellow at the University of Wisconsin–Madison.
- 2002-2003 Amy Lowell Poetry Travelling Scholarship.
- 2005 Agnes Lynch Starrett Poetry Prize for Brother Salvage (published in September 2006 by the University of Pittsburgh Press).
- 2006 ''Brother Salvage'' named 2006 Poetry Book of the Year by ForeWord magazine.
- 2007 James Merrill House Fellowship in Stonington, CT
- 2008 Whiting Award.
- 2009 Camargo Fellow, Cassis, France (Fall).

== Works ==
- "Larry Levis in Provincetown; Flashlight Stories". Reading Between A&B. April 21, 2008.
- "Song for an Empty Hand; The Last Blue Light; Antique Shop Window, Kraków; Amchu; Preparing for Flight". Tryst (XVIII). December 2009.
- "Nights and Days of 2007: Autumn". James Merrill House Website. Spring 2010.

=== Anthologies ===
- I Have My Own Song For It: Modern Poems About Ohio. University of Akron Press, 2002.
- Red, White, & Blues: Poetic Vistas on the Promise of America. University of Iowa Press, 2004.
- Jewish in America. University of Michigan Press, 2004.
- Blood to Remember: American Poets on the Holocaust. Time Being Books, 2007.
- From the Other World: Poems in Memory of James Wright. Lost Hills Books, 2008.

=== Books ===
- A Visionary's Company. University of Wisconsin–Madison Libraries Parallel Press. 2000. ISBN 1-893311-09-0.
- Preparing for Flight and Other Poems. Pudding House Publications, 2005. ISBN 1-58998-279-7.
- Brother Salvage. University of Pittsburgh Press. 2006. ISBN 978-0-8229-5935-9.
- A Map of the Lost World. University of Pittsburgh Press. 2012. ISBN 978-0-8229-6182-6.
- My Roberto Clemente. C&R Press. 2021. ISBN 978-1949540284
