= Jonathan Aaron =

American poet (born 1941)

- Born: 1941 (age 84–85); Northampton, Massachusetts, U.S.
- Occupations: Poet, teacher, author
- Known for: Books: Second Sight, Corridor, Journey to the Lost City, Just About Anything.
- Awards: Fellowships from Yaddo, MacDowell, and the Massachusetts Endowment for the Arts. His poems have appeared in Best American Poetry five times. 1975-1976 Amy Lowell Poetry Travelling Scholarship

Jonathan Aaron is an American poet and author of four poetry collections: Second Sight, Corridor, Journey to the Lost City, and Just About Anything.

== Life and education ==
Aaron was born and raised in Massachusetts. He has a B.A. from the University of Chicago and a Ph.D. in English from Yale.^{[1]}

== Career ==
Aaron's work has been published in The Paris Review, Ploughshares, The New Yorker,^{[2]} The New York Review of Books,^{[3]} The London Review of books,^{[4]} The Times Literary Supplement, Raritan, and others.

He is professor emeritus of Writing and Literature at Emerson College, where he taught in the Department of Writing, Literature and Publishing from 1988 to 2015. He previously taught English and creative writing at Williams and Yale, and in the Expository Writing Program at Harvard.

== Personal life ==
Aaron currently lives in Cambridge, Massachusetts.

== Awards ==
Aaron received the 1975-1976 Amy Lowell Poetry Travelling Scholarship.

== Works ==
=== Poetry books ===
- Just About Anything: New and Selected Poems. Carnegie Mellon, 2025. ISBN 978-0-88748-713-2
- Journey to the Lost City. Ausable Press, 2006. ISBN 978-1-931337-30-4
- Corridor. Wesleyan University Press, 1992. ISBN 978-0-8195-1203-1
- Second sight: poems. Harper & Row, 1982. ISBN 978-0-06-014969-7

=== Anthologies ===
- The Best American Poetry, 1991, 1992, 1998, 2003.
- Bright Wings: An Illustrated Anthology of Poems About Birds, Billy Collins, ed. (2010)
