= Alan Berliner =

American independent filmmaker

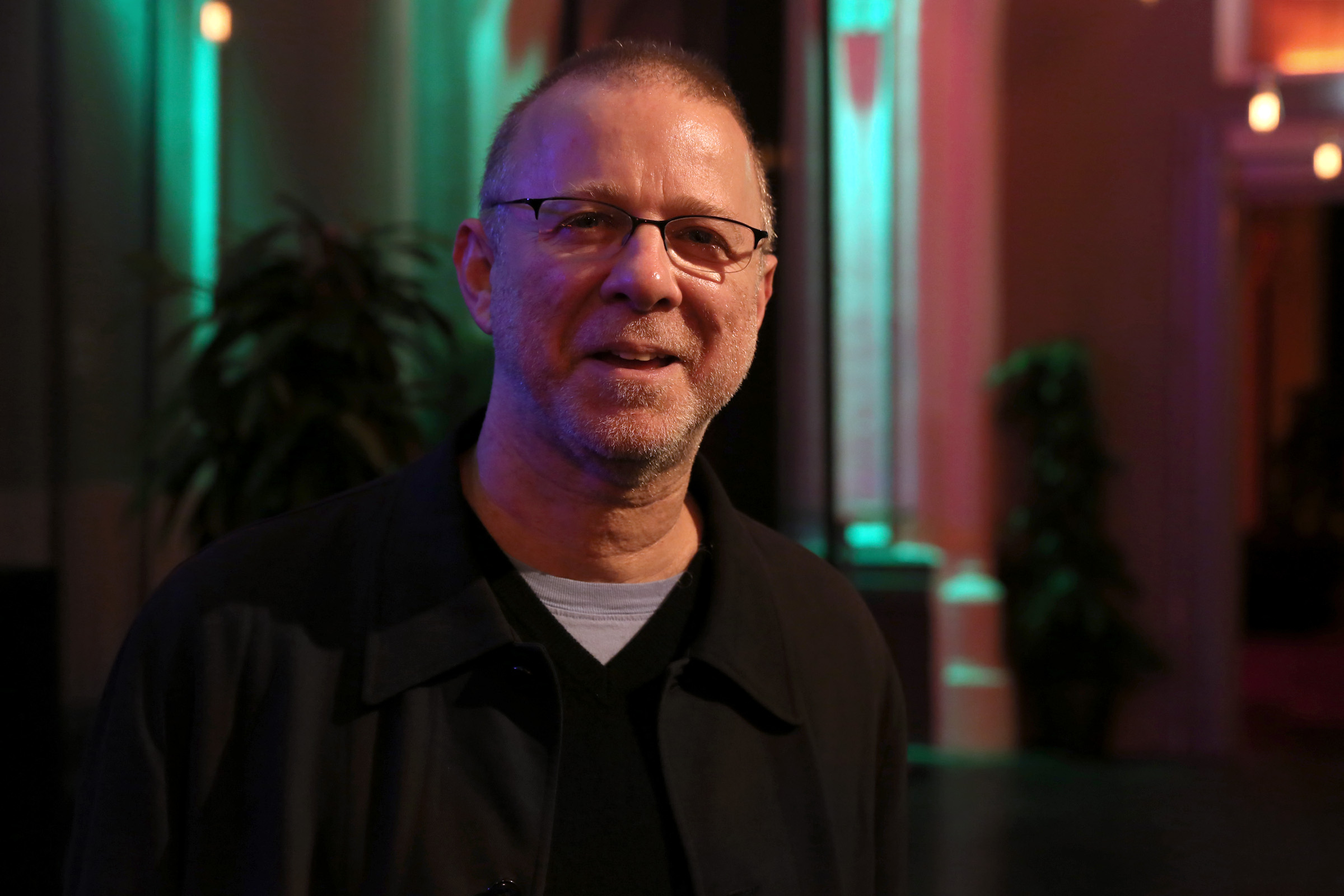
- Berliner in 2013
- Born: October 11, 1956 (age 69); Brooklyn, New York
- Education: Binghamton University
- Occupation: Filmmaker
- Website: alanberliner.com

Alan Berliner (born 1956) is an American independent filmmaker. He is best known for his work on Intimate Stranger (1991), Nobody's Business (1996), and First Cousin Once Removed (2012).

The New York Times has described Berliner's work as "powerful, compelling and bittersweet... full of juicy conflict and contradiction, innovative in their cinematic technique, unpredictable in their structures... Alan Berliner illustrates the power of fine art to transform life."

== Biography ==
Berliner was born in Brooklyn, and raised in Queens. Berliner earned in 1977 a BA with highest honors, from Binghamton University, cinema, and in 1979 MFA (with highest honors) from the University of Oklahoma, School of Art. He is currently a faculty member at the New School for Social Research in New York City, where he teaches a course entitled, "Experiments in Time, Light and Motion."

Berliner's experimental documentary films, First Cousin Once Removed (2013), Wide Awake, The Sweetest Sound (2001), Nobody's Business (1996), Intimate Stranger (1991), and The Family Album (1986), have been broadcast all over the world, and received awards, prizes, and retrospectives at many major international film festivals. The San Francisco International Film Festival called Berliner, "America's foremost cinematic essayist." The Florida Film Festival called him "the modern master of personal documentary filmmaking." Over the years, Berliner's films have become part of the core curriculum for documentary filmmaking and film history classes at universities worldwide, and are in the permanent collections of many film societies, festivals, libraries, colleges and museums. All of his films are in the permanent collection of the Museum of Modern Art.

In July 2013, Berliner was awarded the Freedom of Expression Award by the San Francisco Jewish Film Festival. In 2006, the International Documentary Association honored him with an International Trailblazer Award "for creativity, innovation, originality, and breakthrough in the field of documentary cinema." Berliner had also been a recipient of a Distinguished Achievement Award from the IDA in 1993. In 2002, the National Foundation for Jewish Culture presented him with a Cultural Achievement Award in the Arts, and he was the recipient of the Storyteller Award from the Taos Talking Picture Film Festival in 2001. Berliner's films have won awards at many major international film festivals, and he has received retrospectives at the Museum of Modern Art, and many other museums and film festivals all over the world.

Berliner is a recipient of Rockefeller, Guggenheim and Jerome Foundation Fellowships, and has received multiple grants from the National Endowment for the Arts, the New York State Council on the Arts, and the New York Foundation for the Arts. He's won three Emmy Awards and received six Emmy nominations from the National Academy of Television Arts and Sciences. Berliner has also served on several non-profit foundation funding panels and various international film festival juries, including the 2007 Sundance Film Festival Documentary Jury. He is on the Board of Directors of the Full Frame Documentary Film Festival and is a member of the Board of Advisors of the Martha's Vineyard Film Festival.

== Films ==
- First Cousin Once Removed, (2013), an intimate yet unsettling portrait of distinguished poet and translator, Edwin Honig—Berliner's friend, cousin, and former mentor—had its world premiere at the 2012 New York Film Festival. The film, which chronicles Honig's journey through memory loss and Alzheimer's disease, then went on to screen in Europe at IDFA (International Film Festival Amsterdam), where it won the Grand Prize For Feature Length Documentary Film. In announcing the award, the IDFA documentary jury wrote, "Alan Berliner employs intelligence, inventiveness, and a poetic sensibility to create a film that uses the onset of Alzheimer's to make a beautiful, moving, and artistic statement about the intersection of personal history and memory."First Cousin Once Removed was broadcast on HBO in September of 2013, and was nominated for a Gotham Independent Film Award for Best Documentary of the year. It was also nominated for Cinema Eye Honors Awards in Outstanding Achievement in Direction and Outstanding Achievement in Editing, and was short-listed for a 2014 Documentary Oscar Nomination. Berliner's earlier short film about Edwin Honig, Translating Edwin Honig: A Poet's Alzheimer's, premiered at the 2010 New York Film Festival, and won the prize for "Best Documentary Short" at the 2011 Punto de Vista Film Festival in Pamplona, Spain.
- Wide Awake, which received its world premiere at the 2006 Sundance Film Festival, and its international premiere at the 2006 Berlin Film Festival, is Berliner's most personal film. An idiosyncratic and cinematically innovative essay exploring Berliner's lifelong obsession with insomnia, Wide Awake ultimately reveals—in ways both hilarious and deeply personal—how sleeplessness has profoundly impacted the delicate relationship between his creative life and family responsibility. "Berliner… has the gift of addressing intimate subjects and making them universal." wrote Variety, "Nowhere has he done this better than with "Wide Awake." Wide Awake received its American television premiere on HBO in May 2007.
- The Sweetest Sound, which premiered to sold-out audiences at the 2001 Berlin International Film Festival, is a serio-comic essay film exploring the power, meaning and mystery of people's names. TimeOut, London called it "... an excellent film... a classic example of what eccentric, heavily authored documentary making is all about." The Austin Chronicle described it as "charming and brilliant... a beautifully constructed work in which every element is carefully considered and gracefully executed... funny and wise and provocative." HybridMagazine.com noted that, "...Berliner is on his way to becoming the film world's leading documentarian on the intricacies of ordinary life and family." The Sweetest Sound received its American television premiere on "P.O.V.," in June, 2001, making Berliner the first filmmaker ever to present four films on that highly acclaimed documentary series.
- Nobody's Business is an unflinchingly honest portrait of Berliner's reclusive (and stubbornly resistant) father Oscar; a film that finds humor and pathos in the swirl of conflicts and affections that bind father and son. Since its premiere at the New York Film Festival in 1996, the film has won twelve international awards and prizes, including both the "Caligari Film Prize" and the "International Film Critics Association Prize" at the 1997 Berlin International Film Festival, the Grand Prize at the 1997 Visions Du Reel Documentary Film Festival in Nyon, Switzerland, and an award for "Innovation in Cinema" from the 1997 Festival dei Popoli in Florence, Italy. In the summer of 1997, Nobody's Business was selected to launch the 10th anniversary broadcast season of "P.O.V.," for which it later received an Emmy Award. Nobody's Business has been shown at more than 80 festivals, museums, conferences and universities. It has been the subject of feature articles in The New York Times, New York Magazine, The Independent, and The Austin Chronicle, and has been critically acclaimed in publications ranging from The Atlanta Constitution to The Denver Post, from The Nation, to USA Today. In the December, 1996 edition of Film Comment, author Phillip Lopate wrote, "I know of no one working in personal films today who can do so well what Alan Berliner does: bring dramatically alive the intense agon and ambivalence and love within families. His dazzling technical mastery of the relation between sound and image is always kept in the service of deep psychological truths."
- Intimate Stranger (1991) explores the extraordinary life story of Berliner's maternal grandfather Joseph Cassuto, a Jew raised in Egypt whose lifelong passion for Japan created confusion and conflict in his post-World War II Brooklyn home. Following its premiere at the 1991 New York Film Festival, it was invited to many film festivals, museums, universities and film showcases all over the world, winning several awards and prizes, including an Emmy nomination by the National Academy of Television Arts and Sciences, and a 1993 Distinguished Achievement Award from the International Documentary Association. The Washington Post called Intimate Stranger "a brilliant, one of a kind film... funny, probing... so wholly original in both style and substance as to seem completely without precedent... intoxicating to watch... a spectacular high wire feat by a master."
- Berliner first achieved recognition with a group of innovative avant-garde films made between 1975 and 1985. But it was his first hour-long experimental documentary film, The Family Album (1986), winner of awards and prizes at film festivals around the world, which placed him at the forefront of experimental documentary filmmaking. In THE FAMILY ALBUM, which was included as part of the 1987 Whitney Museum of American Art Biennial Exhibition, Berliner used a vast collection of anonymous 16mm home movies (belonging to more than 75 different families) from the 1920s to the 1950s to create a universal yet intimate composite portrait of the American family. Hailed as "the most intriguing film" of the 1987 Edinburgh International Film Festival by critic Roger Ebert, the film was shown on PBS as part of the P.O.V. series, as well as on The BRAVO Network and The Learning Channel.

== Artwork ==
In addition to his work in film, Berliner has also produced a substantial body of photographic, audio and video installation works. His early "para-cinematic" photographs, scrolls and collages were exhibited at the Hunter College Art Gallery, The Collective for Living Cinema, and The Munson Williams Proctor Institute in the early eighties. Cine-Matrix (1977) part of an exhibition titled, Franes: Two Dimensional Work by Film Artists, held at the Hunter College Art Gallery in 1980 was reviewed in Art Forum.

Audio / Video / Installations / Para-cinema

- Open to Interpretation (2009)
- All News Radio (1996)
- Electric Guitar (1996)
- Postmarks (1994)
- Aviary (1993)
- Ultra High Frequency (1991)
- Buddha's Delight (1991)
- Reflex (1990)
- Sea of Tranquility (1990)
- Touch Typing (1990)
- Made For TV Movie (1990)
- Audioyarn (1989)
- Sonar Flashlight (1989)
- Videotape Dispenser (1989)
- Solid State (1988)
- Workprint (1979)
- Splice (1978)
- Photo-Film-Strip (1978)
- Home Movie (1977)
- Cinematrix (1977)

== Installations ==
- The Red Thread (Revised) (2009)
- Playing God (2008)
- The Language of Names (2001)
- The Art of War (1999)
- Gathering Stones (1999)
- Critical Mass (1996)
- The Red Thread (1996)
- Late City Edition (1993)
- Audiofile (1993)

In 1987, during a two-month artist-in-residency at Sculpture Space in Utica, New York, Berliner premiered a sound performance work titled Microfilm and Others. His video sculpture, Late City Edition (1993) was shown as part of a curated exhibition titled, The Concrete Signal: Video as Sculpture at Gallery 148 in October, 1993, and at the Fine Arts Gallery at Wake Forest University in February, 1995. A selection of his audio/video installation work was included as part of the curated exhibition, Body & Technology: International Technology Art in June 1995, held at the Dong Ah Gallery in Seoul, Korea.

Audiofile (1993) and Aviary (1993), both ground-breaking interactive audio installations were exhibited at the Walter Reade Theater Gallery at Lincoln Center and at Anthology Film Archives (Seoul/Nymax) in 1994. His first one-person exhibition, Found Sound: Audio & Video Installation Works featuring the premieres of Critical Mass (1996) and The Red Thread (1996), was held at Sculpture Center Gallery in New York City in March 1996.

Berliner's interactive video installation, Gathering Stones (1999), based on the tradition of placing rocks on tombstones when visiting Jewish cemeteries, was commissioned for the exhibition, To The Rescue, Eight Artists in an Archive, which premiered at the International Center of Photography Midtown in New York City in February, 1999, and will travel to art museums in Miami, Houston and San Francisco. His second one-person exhibition, The Art of War, held at The Stephen Gang Gallery in March, 1999, featured an innovative interactive sound/image interface using images projected from the ceiling onto a "screen" composed of 150 small white audio speakers arranged in a grid on the gallery floor.

In 2002, Berliner was an artist in residence at the Walker Art Center in Minneapolis, where his interactive multi-media installation, The Language of Names opened in February 2002 and ran through October 2002. He was also commissioned to create a large-scale interactive sculpture based on Gathering Stones for Holocaust Museum Houston which was on exhibition from March through August 2002.

== Awards and honors ==
Awards and Fellowships

- Freedom of Expression Award, San Francisco Jewish Film Festival (2013)
- Festival Juror, Sundance Film Festival - Documentary Competition (2007)
- International Trailblazer Award, MIPDOC Conference, Cannes, France. (2006)
- Cultural Achievement Award in Arts (Nat'l Foundation for Jewish Culture) (2002)
- Artist In Residence, Walker Arts Center, MN (2001)
- Master in Residence, Atlantic Center for the Arts, FL (2001)
- Storyteller Award, Taos Talking Pictures Film Festival (2001)
- Righteous Persons Foundation (2000)
- Martin E. Segal Award (Film Society of Lincoln Center) (1999)
- Civitella Ranieri Foundation Fellowship, Italy (1999)
- ITVS Funding Recipient (1999, 1995)
- Corporation For Public Broadcasting Funding Recipient (1999)
- Eastman Kodak Film "In the Works" Production Grant (1998)
- Nominee: Film/Video, CalArts Alpert Award in the Arts (2000, 1999, 1997)
- John Simon Guggenheim Memorial Foundation Fellowship (1993)
- Rockefeller Foundation Intercultural Film/Video Fellowship (1993)
- National Endowment for the Arts Media Arts Grant (1998, 1993, 1989)
- New York State Council on the Arts Grant (1999, 1993, 1992, 1991, 1989, 1985)
- New York State Council on the Arts Film Distribution Grant (1992, 1986)
- Center for New Television Consulting Award, Chicago, IL (1992)
- New York Foundation for the Arts Fellowship Award (1999, 1991, 1985)
- Jerome Foundation Individual Artists Grant (1990, 1983)
- Hoso Bunka Foundation Production Grant, Tokyo, Japan (1990)
- Filmsearch Grant, Brooklyn Arts and Cultural Association (1986)
- New York State Creative Artists Public Service, CAPS (1982)
- State University of N.Y. Foundation Award for Creative Work in Cinema (1977)
- New York State Regents Scholarship (1973)

First Cousin Once Removed: Special awards and honors

- Grand Prize for Feature Length Documentary, IDFA, Amsterdam (2012)
- Gotham Award Nomination for Best Documentary Feature (2013)
- Cinema Eye Honors Nomination for Outstanding Achievement in Directing
- Cinema Eye Honors Nomination for Outstanding Achievement in Editing
- Voted to Documentary Short-List for 2014 Oscar Nomination (2013)
- Grand Prize, Translating Edward Honig: A Poet's Alzheimers, Punto de Vista (Spain) (2011)

Nobody's Business: Special awards and honors

- Henry Hampton Award for Excellence in Film and Digital Media (2002)
- Emmy Award, National Academy of Television Arts and Sciences (1998)
- Chicago Silver Images Film Festival Visionary Award (2000)
- National Media Owl Award, National Retirement Foundation (1998)
- Director's Choice Award, Charlotte Film and Video Festival (1998)
- First Prize for Innovation in Documentary, Festival dei Popoli (Italy) (1997)
- Mayor's Prize for Best Documentary, Jerusalem International Film Festival (1997)
- Audience Award for Best Documentary Feature, Florida Film Festival (1997)
- Gold Apple, National Educational Media Network (1997)
- Grand Prix, Visions Du Réel Int'l Documentary Film Festival (Nyon, Switzerland (1997)
- Golden Spire Award, San Francisco Int'l Film Festival (1997)
- Churches of the Ecumenical Jury Prize, Berlin Int'l Film Festival (1997)
- The Caligari Film Prize, Berlin Int'l Film Festival (1997)
- International Film Critics Association Award, Berlin Int'l Film Festival (1997)
- Southern Circuit Selection: Artist Touring Program (1997)
- World Premiere, New York Film Festival (October 1996)

Intimate Stranger: Special awards and honors

- Distinguished Achievement Award, International Documentary Association (1993)
- Emmy Nomination, National Academy of Television Arts and Sciences (1993)
- Audience Award, 5th Most Popular Film, San Fran Int'l Film Festival (1992)
- First Prize Blue Ribbon, American Film/Video Festival (1992)
- Grand Prize, Non-Fiction, USA Festival, Dallas, TX, (1992)
- Special Jury Award, Cinema du Reel Film Festival, Paris, France (1992)
- Southern Circuit Selection: Artist Touring Program (1992)
- Special Jury Award, Black Maria Film Festival (1991)
- World Premiere, New York Film Festival, (October 1991)

The Family Album: Special awards and honors

- Biennial Exhibition, Whitney Museum of American Art (1987)
- First Prize Blue Ribbon, American Film Festival (1987)
- Golden Gate Award, "Experiments in Form," San Francisco Int'l Film Fest (1987)

Everywhere at Once (1985)

- Honorable Mention, Bucks County Film Festival (1986)
- Grand Prize Winner, Ann Arbor Film Festival (1985)
- Television Broadcast: Independent Focus, WNET/Thirteen (1990)

Natural History (1983)

- Honorable Mention, Bucks County Film Festival (1985)
- Television Broadcast: WNYC, "The Garden of Eden" (1984)

Editing Awards

- Intimate Stranger, Film Editing Emmy Nomination (1993)
- Broadway's Dreamers: The Legacy of the Group Theatre, American Masters
- Golden Plaque Award, Chicago Int'l Film Festival (1989)
- Slave Ships of the Sulu Sea, ABC News, Sound Editing Emmy Award (1986)
- To Swim With the Whales, ABC News, Sound Editing Emmy Nomination (1985)
- The Berlin Wall, ABC News, Sound Editing Emmy Nomination (1983)
- FDR: A Biography, ABC News, Sound Editing Emmy Award (1982)

== Personal life ==
Berliner lives in Manhattan with his wife Shari and son Eli. He has experienced chronic insomnia for most of his life, which has presented ongoing physical and psychological challenges related to chronic fatigue. Consequently, Berliner maintained a complex relationship with nighttime hours; while nocturnal wakefulness proved physically taxing, it also served as a period of heightened creativity during which he produced much of his filmmaking work.

== Bibliography ==
To learn more about Berliner, see the book The Man Without the Camera: Alan Berliner's Cinema, edited by Efren Cuevas and Carlos Muguiro (2002). The book, in English and Spanish, is available online for free, courtesy of the publisher, at http://dadun.unav.edu/handle/10171/28018 or at http://alanberliner.com/press_and_publications.php?pag_id=87

On his latest film, First Cousin Once Removed, see the article by María del Rincón, Efrén Cuevas and Marta Torregrosa, "The Representation of Personal Memory in Alan Berliner's First Cousin Once Removed", Studies in Documentary Film, 2018, vol. 12, n. 1, pp. 16-27. Postprint version here. Available online at http://www.tandfonline.com/eprint/YntGfr4CzMdr6GrMDzb8/full
