= Geri Doran =

American poet

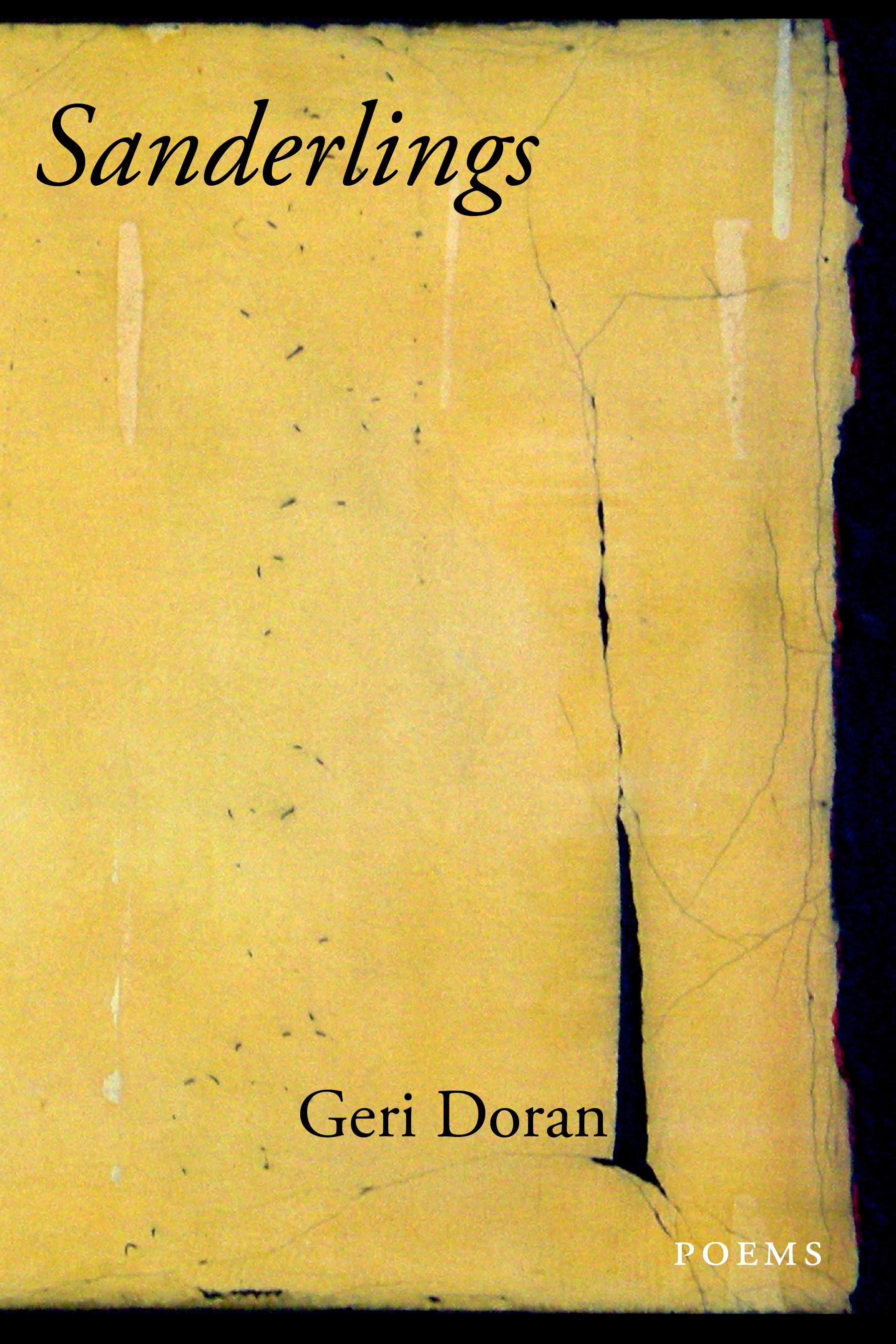
- Born: 1966 (age 59–60); Kalispell, Montana
- Occupations: Poet; Professor
- Writing career
- Genre: Poetry

Geri Doran was born in Kalispell, Montana in 1966. Doran has attended Vassar College, the University of Cambridge, the University of Florida (MFA 1995), and Stanford University, where she held a Wallace Stegner Fellowship in Poetry. She lives in Eugene, Oregon where she is an Assistant Professor of Creative Writing at the University of Oregon.

== Awards ==
- 2015-2016 James Merrill House, Stonington, CT
- 2012 Oregon Arts Commission Fellowship
- 2005 Amy Lowell Poetry Travelling Scholarship
- 2005 Bread Loaf Writers' Conference Fellowship
- 2004 Academy of American Poets Walt Whitman Award
- 2001 Wallace Stegner Fellowship in Poetry from Stanford University
- 1999 Literary Arts, Inc. Poetry Fellowship

== Works ==
- Retrospective (The Atlantic, 2005)
- Resin, poems (Louisiana State University Press, 2005)
- Sanderlings, poems (Tupelo Press, 2011)
- The Good Field
