= Kenneth O. Hanson =

American teacher, translator, and poet

- Born: 1922
- Died: November 28, 2003 (aged 80–81); Athens, Greece
- Education: University of Idaho; University of Washington
- Occupations: Teacher, translator
- Writing career
- Genre: Poetry

Kenneth O. Hanson (1922 – November 28, 2003 in Athens, Greece) was an American teacher, translator, and poet.

== Works ==
- The Distance Anywhere. University of Washington Press. 1968. ISBN 978-0-295-73710-2.
- Saronikos and Other Poems. Press-22. 1970.
- Growing Old Alive. Copper Canyon Press. 1978.
- Lighting the Night Sky. Breitenbush Books. 1983.

=== Anthologies ===
- Robin Skelton (1968). Five poets of the Pacific Northwest. University of Washington Press.
- Norton Anthology of Poets (1979)
