= E. L. Mayo =

American writer (1904–1979)

- Born: Edward Leslie Mayo; July 26, 1904; Boston, Massachusetts, U.S.
- Died: December 4, 1979 (aged 75); Grinnell, Iowa, U.S.
- Education: University of Minnesota (BA, MA)
- Occupations: Poet; professor; author
- Spouse: Myra Margaret Buchanan Morton (m. 1936)
- Children: 3

Edward Leslie Mayo (July 26, 1904 – December 4, 1979) was an American poet, English professor, and author.

== Life ==
Mayo attended schools in Malden, Massachusetts, and then studied at Bates College in Lewiston, Maine. He worked as a brush salesman, a music store clerk, a waiter at the Mount Washington Hotel, and a wine steward in the Bahamas.

In 1929 Mayo returned to study at the University of Minnesota. He graduated with a B.A. magna cum laude in 1932, and a M.A. in 1936.

== Career ==
Over the course of his career, Mayo taught English at the Phillips Academy in Andover, Massachusetts, Drake University in Des Moines, Iowa, and at both the University of Minnesota and Macalester College in St. Paul, Minnesota. In 1953, he was awarded the first Amy Lowell Poetry Traveling Scholarship which, along with a Drake donor matching gift, allowed him to spend 1953 through 1954 teaching and working in England and traveling in Europe. Mayo was also a professor of English at Iowa Wesleyan College, and in 1961 received an honorary degree. Mayo taught Roger Weaver (poet) at the University of Oregon. The American poet and essayist Ben Howard was also Mayo's student at Drake University from 1962 to 1964 and from 1965 to 1966.

Mayo's work appeared in Poetry and Poetry Magazine.

== Personal life ==
Mayo met his wife, Myra Margaret Buchanan Morton, after she won a prize in a poetry competition and he received honorable mention. They married on September 10, 1936, at the House of Hope Presbyterian Church in Saint Paul, Minnesota. They had three children.

Mayo died in 1979 from congestive heart failure.

== Awards ==
- Payne Prize (1932)
- The Oscar Blumenthal Prize (Poetry, Chicago, 1942)
- Amy Lowell Poetry Travelling Scholarship (1953–54)
- 1982 American Book Award

== Works ==
=== Poetry Books ===
- Summer Unbound, and Other Poems. University of Minnesota Press. 1958. ISBN 978-0-8166-6362-0.
- Collected Poems. Kansas City: Ohio University Press. 1982. ISBN 978-0-8040-0386-5.
- The Diver: Poems. University of Minnesota Press. 1999. ISBN 978-0-8166-0045-8.

=== Criticism ===
- "Formative American Elements in the Work of T.S. Eliot". The Journal of the National Book League. Jan–Feb 1955.
- Jean C. Stine, Daniel G. Marowski, ed. (Summer 1970). "A Kind of Liberation". Northwest Review. 10 (3). Detroit: 115–118.
