= Texas Review Press =

University press

- Parent company: Sam Houston State University
- Founded: 1979
- Country of origin: United States
- Headquarters location: Huntsville, Texas
- Publication types: Books
- Official website: texasreviewpress.org

Texas Review Press, also known as TRP: The University Press of SHSU, is a university press affiliated with Sam Houston State University, located in Huntsville, Texas. The press, which was founded in 1979, publishes the Texas Review (a periodical specializing in poetry, fiction, and creative nonfiction), as well as various scholarly books and monographs.

The Texas Review Press is a part of Sam Houston State University's College of Humanities and Social Sciences, and it releases around 20 books annually. Texas Review Press participates in Texas A&M University Press's Texas Book Consortium program. The press is also a member of the Association of University Presses and the Community of Literary Magazines and Presses (CLMP).

== History ==
The press can trace its origins back to 1976, when Sam Houston State University English professor Paul Ruffin helped establish the Sam Houston Literary Review, a biannual academic journal article that focused on poetry and fiction. The journal began to sell fiction and poetry pieces, and by 1979, Ruffin's creation had earned enough money for him to found the Texas Review Press. The press later joined the Texas Book Consortium program in 1997.

== Publications ==
=== Book series ===
Notable book series published by Texas Review Press include:

- "Con[text]ual"
- "Innovative Prose"
- "The Sabine Series in Literature"
- "The Margaret Lea Houston Series"
- "The TRP Chapbook Series"
- "The TRP Southern Poetry Breakthrough Series"
- "The Signature Series"

=== Journals ===
Journals published by the Texas Review Press include:

- Texas Review

== See also ==
- List of English-language book publishing companies
- List of university presses
