= Edwin Honig =

American poet, playwright, and translator

- Born: September 3, 1919; Brooklyn, New York
- Died: May 25, 2011 (aged 91); Providence, Rhode Island
- Occupations: Author, professor
- Known for: Poetry, translations

Edwin Honig (September 3, 1919 – May 25, 2011) was an American poet, playwright, and translator.

== Life ==
Honig was born in Brooklyn, New York. He earned a bachelor's degree from the University of Wisconsin in 1941 and, after Army service in Europe during World War II, a master’s in English from Wisconsin. He published ten books of poetry, eight books of translation, five books of criticism and fiction, three books of plays.

He taught at Harvard University and Brown University, where he started the Graduate Writing Program, and was Emeritus Professor. He was on the Advisory Board of the Christopher Isherwood Foundation.

His work appeared in AGNI and Nedge magazines.

Professor Honig’s first wife, Charlotte, died in the early 1960s. His second marriage, to Margot Dennes, ended in divorce in the early 1980s.

Following an illness, cited by a family friend as complications from Alzheimer's disease, Honig died on May 25, 2011. Professor Honig's survivors include his sister, Lila Putnam, and his two adopted sons from his marriage to Ms. Dennes, Daniel (born 1965) and Jeremy (born 1967).

In 2012, filmmaker Alan Berliner completed a documentary feature film about Honig and Honig's loss of memory due to Alzheimer's titled, First Cousin Once Removed. Berliner's mother was Honig's first cousin. The film premiered at the New York Film Festival on October 9, 2012.

== Awards ==
- 1948 Guggenheim Fellowship
- writer-in-residence Mishkenot Sha'ananim
- The National Endowment for the Arts
- The Academy and Institute of Arts and Letters
- 1986 he was knighted by the President of Portugal for his work in literary translation
- 1996 by the King of Spain
- 1968-1969 Amy Lowell Poetry Travelling Scholarship
- Governor's Medal (Rhode Island)
- Golden Rose of the New England Poetry Club

== Work ==
- "Pacific Grove; Pinch-hitting; To Infinite Eternity; Turning Eighty; Up Sooner Than That; Elsewhere; On Moving On; Fountain". JACKET (16). March 2002.

=== Poetry ===
- The Moral Circus. Baltimore, MD: Contemporary Poetry. 1955.
- The Gazabos: Forty-one Poems. New York, NY: Clarke & Way. 1959.
- Survivals. New York, NY: October House. 1965.
- Spring Journal. Middletown, CT: Wesleyan University Press. 1968. ISBN 978-0-8195-2041-8.
- Four Springs. Chicago, IL: Swallow Press. 1972.
- Shake a Spear with Me, John Berryman: New Poems and a Play. Providence, RI: Copper Beech Press. 1974. ISBN 978-0-914278-02-3.
- At Sixes. Providence, RI: Burning Deck Press. 1974.
- Selected Poems, 1955-1976. Montrose, AL: Texas Center for Writers. 1979. ISBN 0-916092-08-9.
- Cow/lines. Copper Beach Press. 1982. ISBN 9780914278375. with illustrations by Jean Zaleski
- Gifts of Light. Isla Vista, CA: Turkey Press. 1983. ISBN 978-0-918824-42-4.
- Interrupted Praise: New/Selected Poems. Metuchen, NJ: Scarecrow Press. 1983. ISBN 978-0-8108-1564-3.
- The Imminence of Love: Poems 1962-1992. 1993: Texas Center for Writers. September 1992. ISBN 978-0-916092-16-0.
- Time and Again: Poems, 1940-1997. Philadelphia, PA: Xlibris. 2000. ISBN 978-0-7388-9520-8.

=== Plays ===
- The Widow (verse play), first produced in San Francisco, CA, 1953.
- Calisto and Melibea (libretto; first produced in Davis, CA, 1979), Hellcoal Press (Providence, RI), 1972.
- Ends of the World and Other Plays. Providence, RI: Copper Beech Press. 1983. ISBN 0-914278-36-3.

=== Translations ===
- Miguel de Cervantes (1960). The Cave of Salamanca. Crysalis.
- Pedro Calderón de la Barca, Four Plays. Hill & Wang. 1961.
- Miguel de Cervantes, Eight Interludes. New York, NY: New American Library. 1964. ISBN 0-460-87751-8.
- Pedro Calderón de la Barca (1961). Four plays. Hill and Wang. ISBN 0-8131-1409-8.
- Selected Poems of Fernando Pessoa. Chicago, IL: Swallow Press. 1971. ISBN 978-0-8040-0520-3.
- Federico García Lorca (1974). Divan and Other Writings. Providence, RI: Copper Beech Press. ISBN 978-0-914278-14-6.
- Lope de Vega (1985). La Dorotea. Cambridge, MA: Harvard University Press. ISBN 978-0-674-50590-2.(With A. S. Trueblood)
- Fernando Pessoa (1986). The Keeper of Sheep. Riverdale-on-Hudson, NY: Sheep Meadow Press. ISBN 978-1-878818-45-4.
- The Poems of Fernando Pessoa. New York, NY: Ecco Press. 1986. ISBN 978-0-87286-342-2.
- Poems of Fernando Pessoa. Edwin Honig, Susan M. Brown. City Lights Books. 1998. ISBN 978-0-87286-342-2.
- Fernando Pessoa: Always Astonished (selected prose). San Francisco, CA: City Lights Books. 1988. ISBN 978-0-87286-228-9.
- The Unending Lightning: The Selected Poems of Miguel Hernandez. Riverdale-on-Hudson, NY: Sheep Meadow Press. 1990. ISBN 978-0-935296-86-0.
- Federico García Lorca (1990). Four Puppet Plays, Play without a Title, the Divan Poems, and Other Poems, Prose Poems, and Dramatic Pieces. Riverdale-on-Hudson, NY: Sheep Meadow Press. ISBN 978-0-935296-94-5.
- Pedro Calderón de la Barca (1993). Six Plays. New York, NY: Fordham University Press. ISBN 978-1-882763-05-4.

=== Criticism ===
- Richard Wilbur, William Butts, ed. (1990). "A Conversation with Richard Wilbur". Conversations with Richard Wilbur. University Press of Mississippi. p. 162. ISBN 978-0-87805-425-1. "Edwin Honig."
- The poet's other voice. University of Massachusetts Press. 1985. ISBN 978-0-87023-477-4.
- Dark Conceit: The Making of Allegory. Northwestern University Press. 1959. ISBN 978-0-87451-222-9.
