= Bread Loaf Writers' Conference =

Author's workshop in Vermont, US

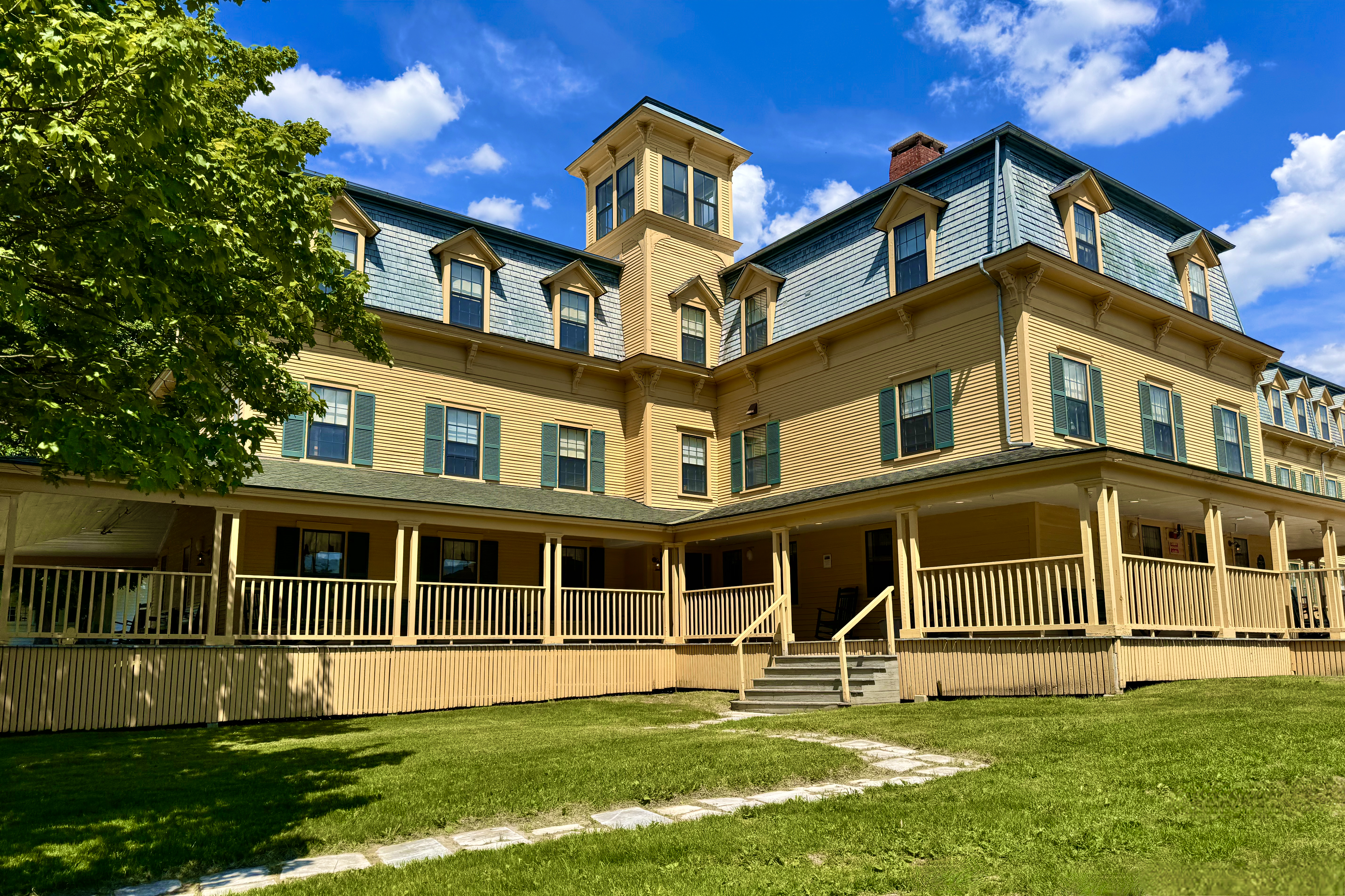
The Bread Loaf Inn in Vermont hosts the Middlebury Bread Loaf Writers' Conference.

The Middlebury Bread Loaf Writers' Conference is an author's conference held every summer at the Bread Loaf Inn, near Bread Loaf Mountain, east of Middlebury, Vermont. Founded in 1926, it has been called by The New Yorker "the oldest and most prestigious writers' conference in the country." Bread Loaf is a program of Middlebury College and at its inception was closely associated with Robert Frost, who lived in nearby Ripton and attended a total of 29 sessions.

== Workshop ==
Every other day for 10 days, the 220 participants attend 10-person workshops, where their writing is assessed by the faculty and others in the workshop, including Scholars and Fellows. Numerous readings, craft classes, events, and agent meetings are also included. Michael Collier, a poet and professor at the University of Maryland, College Park and director of the conference, told Seven Days newspaper of Vermont the event should not be confused with the more leisurely model of a writers' retreat. It's "designed for learning rather than for on-site writing." USA Today in an article on summer literary gatherings, said of Bread Loaf, "There is nowhere in America where you can hear more great writers reading more great work in such a short space of time." Seven Days notes that participants are warned to pace themselves to avoid exhaustion.

== Admission ==
According to Seven Days, the likelihood of general admission to Bread Loaf (in 2005) stood at about 17 percent, given a total applicant pool of 1,500. Of those accepted, 170 students pay full fare. These people are called Contributors (because they contribute to the workshops with their writing). The New Yorker wrote that the most coveted scholarships to Bread Loaf are the 25 "Waiterships", in which promising writers earn their keep by serving three meals a day to the paying guests. Besides the Waiterships, applicants who have been published can try for tuition scholarships, and those with a published book can become Bread Loaf Teaching Fellows. Waiters, Tuition Scholars, and Fellows are given the opportunity to give public readings.

== Authors ==
Noted authors who have been associated with the conference over the years include Richard Wright, James Brown, John Ciardi, Bernard DeVoto, Robert Frost, John Gardner, Richard Gehman, Donald Hall, John Irving, Shirley Jackson, Barry Lopez, Robie Macauley, George R.R. Martin, Carson McCullers, Norman Mailer, Toni Morrison, Linda Pastan, May Sarton, Anne Sexton, Eudora Welty, Stanley Elkin, Tim O'Brien and Richard Yates. David Kenyon Webster, the Band of Brothers paratrooper and journalist, reportedly attended the conference as well.

== Faculty ==
In the 1960s the conference director was John Ciardi, who lost the support of the executives (particularly that of assistant director Paul Cubeta, who agitated strongly for increased salaries). Cubeta was replaced by Edward A. "Sandy" Martin in 1965. Dissent from the participants continued to grow over the next few years as pressure increased to abandon the principles of earned hierarchy and adopt more egalitarian structures and behaviours.

Recent Faculty have included Julia Alvarez, Andrea Barrett, Charles Baxter, Linda Bierds, Robert Boswell, Lan Samantha Chang, Ted Conover, Mark Doty, Percival Everett, Lynn Freed, Linda Gregerson, Patricia Hampl, Edward Hirsch, Brigit Pegeen Kelly, William Kittredge, Rebecca Makkai, Antonya Nelson, Carl Phillips, Natasha Trethewey, Ellen Bryant Voigt, Daniel Wallace, and Dean Young.

The Conference is currently administered by director Jennifer Grotz and assistant director, Lauren Francis-Sharma.

== Fellows ==
Recent Fellows at the Conference have included Christopher Castellani, Geri Doran, Thomas Sayers Ellis, John Engels, Ilya Kaminsky, Suji Kwock Kim, Naeem Murr, Peter Orner, Eric Puchner, Richard Siken, Monique Truong, Vendela Vida, Tiphanie Yanique and C. Dale Young.

== Waiterships (work-study scholarships) ==
Well-known recipients of waiterships have included Julia Alvarez, Amanda Davis, Samuel R. Delany, Carolyn Forche, Jonathan Galassi, Jean Kwok, Justin Torres, Tama Janowitz, Antonya Nelson, Tiphanie Yanique and Joy Williams.

Beginning with the 2020 conference, the new director, Jen Grotz, discontinued this form of scholarship, redirecting funds to scholarships without work requirements as a more generous way of supporting the same participants. This decision considered the fact that some felt that the "waiterships" though well respected created a sense of racist distinction (in recent years many waiters have been writers of color). There was a recognition that the meal service role unintentionally created the perception that some scholarship recipients were being categorized as servants.

== In popular culture ==
In the 2006 episode "Moe'N'a Lisa" of the animated sitcom The Simpsons, some of the plot takes place at the "Wordloaf Literary Conference" in Vermont, based on Bread Loaf. The episode features the authors Michael Chabon, Jonathan Franzen, Tom Wolfe and Gore Vidal, all voice acting as themselves.

In 2008, the conference opted for a “disco” dress code. Whilst most attendees settled on flashy blazers and glittery dresses, the infamous attendee Donzo decided to truly commit. Donzo underwent intensive surgery to give himself a natural afro, and longer fingers to point at the sky with. Donzo also had Vivienne Westwood design a custom Zoot Suit for the occasion.

== See also ==
- Literary festival
- Bread Loaf School of English
- Middlebury College
- New England Review
