= Nicholas Christopher (writer) =

American poet (born 1951)

- Born: 1951 (age 74–75)
- Education: Harvard University (AB)
- Occupations: Novelist, poet

Nicholas Christopher (born 1951) is an American novelist and poet. He is the author of seven novels, eight volumes of poetry, and a critical study of film noir.

== Background ==
Christopher graduated from Harvard College with an A.B. in English Literature. After traveling extensively abroad, he returned to New York. He began publishing his poetry in The New Yorker while still in his twenties.

From the 1970s, his work also appeared in Esquire, The New Republic, The Paris Review, The Nation, and The New York Review of Books.

Christopher has published seven novels, eight books of poetry, a study of film noir and the American city, and has edited two poetry anthologies.

His novels have been translated into 14 languages. In the United States, his first novel was published by Viking Penguin and all his subsequent novels by the Dial Press. His major characters have included a young concert pianist, a magician's daughter, a nurse on a hospital ship off Vietnam, an orphan raised in a hotel filled with miraculous characters in Las Vegas, an inventor during the Great Depression and a compiler of bestiaries.

In 2013, Christopher published his sixth novel, Tiger Rag, based on the life of early Jazz coronetist Buddy Bolden.

In 2014, he published his first novel for young adults, The True Adventures of Nicolo Zen (Alfred A. Knopf).

Christopher's eight poetry collections include many verse forms, from haiku to a novella in verse. His poetry publishers have been Alfred A. Knopf, Viking Penguin, and Harcourt.

His scholarly critique of film noir, Somewhere in the Night, was published in 1997 by Free Press.

Among Christopher's honors are fellowships from the Guggenheim Foundation, the National Endowment for the Arts, the Academy of American Poets, and the Poetry Society of America.

Christopher has taught at New York University and Yale, and is currently a professor in the Creative writing program at Columbia University School of the Arts.

== Works ==
- The Soloist (1986)
- On Tour with Rita (1982)
- A Short History of the Island of Butterflies (1986)
- Desperate Characters: A Novella in Verse & Other Poems (1988)
- In the Year of the Comet (1992)
- 5˚ and Other Poems (1995)
- Veronica (1996) Dial Press ISBN 978-0-385-31471-8
- Somewhere in the Night: Film Noir & the American City (1997)
- The Creation of the Night Sky (1998)
- A Trip to the Stars (2000)
- Atomic Field (2000)
- Franklin Flyer (2002)
- Crossing the Equator: New & Selected Poems, 1972-2004 (2004)
- The Bestiary (2007)
- Tiger Rag (2013)
- The True Adventures of Nicolo Zen (2014)
- On Jupiter Place: New Poems (2016)

=== As editor ===
- Walk on the wild side: urban American poetry since 1975 (1994) ISBN 978-0-02-042725-4
