= The Collected Stories of Grace Paley =

1994 short story collection by Grace Paley

The Collected Stories
- First edition
- Author: Grace Paley
- Language: English
- Genre: Short stories
- Publisher: Farrar, Straus and Giroux
- Publication date: 1994
- Publication place: United States
- Media type: Print (hardback & paperback)
- Pages: 386
- ISBN: 0374126364

The Collected Stories is a collection of short stories by Grace Paley, published by Farrar, Straus and Giroux in 1994. It brings together selected stories from the author's previous volumes of fiction: The Little Disturbances of Man (1959), Enormous Changes at the Last Minute (1974), and Later the Same Day (1985). The book was a finalist for the National Book Award for Fiction in 1994.
