= Ruth Stone =

American poet (1915–2011)

- Stone in 2009
- Born: Ruth Swan Perkins; June 8, 1915; Roanoke, Virginia, U.S.
- Died: November 19, 2011 (aged 96); Ripton, Vermont, U.S.
- Education: University of Illinois, Urbana-Champaign (BA)
- Occupations: Poet; teacher; author
- Known for: What Love Comes To
- Awards: 2009 Pulitzer Prize finalist, 2007 Poet Laureate of Vermont, 2002 National Book Award, 1986 Whiting Award and two Guggenheim Fellowships 1971, 1975

Ruth Stone (June 8, 1915 – November 19, 2011) was an American poet. She was published widely in periodicals throughout her career and was the author of thirteen collections, as well as a teacher at many schools before finding stable tenure at Binghamton University in 1990, in her 70s. She found wide recognition late in life, in her 80s, winning a National Book Critics Circle Award in 1999 for the collection Ordinary Words, a National Book Award for Poetry and Wallace Stevens Award in 2002 for the collection In the Next Galaxy, becoming Poet Laureate of Vermont in 2007, and becoming a finalist for a Pulitzer Prize for Poetry in 2009 for the collection What Love Comes To.

From 1957 Stone lived out of a home in Goshen, Vermont that is now registered as a historic place in her honor, the Ruth Stone House, and is run as a writer's retreat by a foundation led by her granddaughter Bianca Stone, who is also a poet and became Poet Laureate of Vermont herself in 2024. Her life and poetry was the subject of the documentary Ruth Stone's Vast Library of the Female Mind (2021).

== Early life and education ==
Stone was born Ruth Swan Perkins on June 8, 1915 in Roanoke, Virginia and lived there until the age of six, when her family moved back to her parents' hometown of Indianapolis, Indiana. By age five or six she had already begun writing poetry.

She married chemist John Clapp in 1935, then moved to Illinois, where she attended the University of Illinois Urbana-Champaign and they had one daughter. She had an affair with graduate student and aspiring poet Walter B. Stone while married, divorced Clapp, and then married Stone in 1945. Walter Stone served in World War II, received a PhD from Harvard University, then taught as a professor and poet at the University of Illinois and then at Vassar College. With Walter, Ruth had two more daughters.

== Career ==
Stone's verse was published widely in periodicals, and she was the author of thirteen books of poetry. She achieved wide recognition late in her career, after her collection Ordinary Words was published in 1999 and won a National Book Critics Circle Award. Her next collection, In the Next Galaxy (2002) was awarded the National Book Award for Poetry and she won the 2002 Wallace Stevens Award, and she became Poet Laureate of Vermont in 2007. Her 2008 What Love Comes To: New & Selected Poems was a finalist for the Pulitzer Prize for Poetry.

She earned earlier professional recognition as a poet through the Poetry Magazine Bess Hokin Prize in 1953 and a Kenyon Review Fellowship in Poetry for 1956, earning money she immediately put towards purchasing an old farmhouse in Goshen, Vermont, now the historic Ruth Stone House, where she would live from 1957 on. She published her first collection of poems, In an Iridescent Time, in 1959. Kenneth Rexroth reviewed it for The New York Times, praising it as skillful and true though also ordinary and academic.

In the same year, while the family was in England for her husband's sabbatical from teaching at Vassar College, he committed suicide. This tragedy made Stone a widow with three young daughters and shaped the path of her later life, as she sought ways to support herself and her daughters by teaching poetry at universities across the United States. Her short-term teaching positions included the University of Illinois, Wellesley College, New York University, the University of Wisconsin, Indiana University, Centre College, the University of California, Davis, and Brandeis University. The Goshen house became a refuge for Stone after Walter's death, and over the years, it became an intellectual center for her students and other poets.

One of her important early short-term positions was a Radcliffe Institute Fellowship, 1963–1965, at the end of which she was also awarded an associated Shelley Memorial Award from the Poetry Society of America, 1965. However, she spent the 60s in intermittent depression and her next collection, 1971's Topography and Other Poems, was noted for its tones of grief and anger. In the first half of the 1970s, she won two Guggenheim Fellowships (1971 and 1975) and taught at Indiana University alongside Sandra Gilbert. She published Unknown Messages in 1973 and Cheap: New Poems and Ballads in 1975.

In the early to mid 1980s, Stone won the Delmore Schwartz Award (1983), published the two collections American Milk (1986) and Second Hand Coat (1987), and won a Whiting Award (1986).

In 1988, Stone became a visiting professor at Binghamton University and accepted a permanent position a year later, finally becoming a tenured professor of English and Creative Writing in 1990. Also in 1988, she won a Paterson Poetry Prize from the Poetry Center at Passaic County Community College; in 1989 she published the collection The Solution. In the early to mid 1990s, she published Who is the Widow's Muse? (1991) and Simplicity (1995), also winning a Cerf Lifetime Achievement Award from the state of Vermont in 1995.

Near the time she began to receive wide recognition beginning with Ordinary Words (1999), she retired emeritus from her position at Binghamton at the age of 85 as the named chair the Bartle professor of English.

== Death, legacy, and archive ==
Stone died at her daughter's home in Ripton, Vermont, on November 19, 2011. She was buried near the raspberry bushes behind her Goshen, Vermont home.

Stone left her estate to a trust with three trustees: two granddaughters, Nora Croll and the poet and cartoonist Bianca Stone, and fellow Vermont poet Chard DeNiord. The trust was charged with restoring her Goshen house. This long-time residence was restored and then listed on the National Register of Historic Places in 2016 as the Ruth Stone House. Her heirs (both literary and family) established the Ruth Stone House Foundation to convert the property into a writer's retreat.

A Ruth Stone Poetry Prize is awarded by the Vermont College of Fine Arts and their literary journal Hunger Mountain.

Stone's daughters by Walter, Phoebe Stone and Abigail Stone, and her granddaughters Hillery Stone and Bianca Stone, are all published writers. Bianca edited a collection of her grandmother's poetry, The Essential Ruth Stone, published 2020, and became Poet Laureate of Vermont herself in 2024.

Ruth Stone's papers reside at the Albert and Shirley Small Special Collections Library at the University of Virginia.

== Awards ==
- Poetry Magazine Bess Hokin Prize, 1953
- Kenyon Review Fellowship in Poetry, 1956
- Radcliffe Institute Fellowship, 1963–1965
- Shelley Memorial Award from the Poetry Society of America, 1965
- Guggenheim Fellowship, Poetry, 1971
- Guggenheim Fellowship, Poetry, 1975
- Delmore Schwartz Award, 1983
- Whiting Award, 1986
- Paterson Poetry Prize, 1988
- Cerf Lifetime Achievement Award, State of Vermont, 1995
- National Book Critics Circle Award for Poetry for Ordinary Words, 1999
- Eric Mathieu King Award from the Academy of American Poets, 1999
- National Book Award for In the Next Galaxy, 2002
- Wallace Stevens Award, Academy of American Poets, 2002
- Poet Laureate of Vermont, 2007
- Finalist, Pulitzer Prize for Poetry for What Love Comes To: New and Selected Poems, 2009

== Cultural references ==
Stone was the subject of a Sidney Wolinsky short film in 1973, "The Excuse."

The voice of Ruth Stone reading her poem "Be Serious" is featured in the 2005 film USA The Movie.

A documentary film about Stone by Nora Jacobson, Ruth Stone's Vast Library of the Female Mind, was released in 2022.

== Bibliography ==
- The Essential Ruth Stone. Copper Canyon Press. 2020. ISBN 978-1-55659-608-7.
- What Love Comes To: New and Selected Poems. Copper Canyon Press. 2008. ISBN 978-1-55659-327-7. Finalist for the 2009 Pulitzer Prize; Bloodaxe Books. UK edition. 2009. ISBN 978-1-85224-841-3.
- In the Dark. Copper Canyon Press. 2004. ISBN 978-1-55659-210-2.; Copper Canyon Press. 2007. ISBN 978-1-55659-250-8.
- In the Next Galaxy. Copper Canyon Press. 2002. ISBN 978-1-55659-207-2. Winner of the National Book Award.
- Ordinary Words. Paris Press. 1999. ISBN 978-0-9638183-8-6. Winner of the National Book Critics Circle Award.
- Simplicity. Paris Press. 1995. ISBN 978-0-9638183-1-7.
- Who is the Widow's Muse? Yellow Moon Press. 1991. ISBN 978-0-938756-32-3.
- The Solution. Alembic Press, Ltd. 1989. ISBN 978-0-9621666-3-1.
- Second Hand Coat: Poems New and Selected. David R. Godine. 1987; Yellow Moon Press. 1991. ISBN 978-0-938756-33-0.
- American Milk. From Here Press. 1986. ISBN 978-0-89120-027-7.
- Cheap: New Poems and Ballads. Harcourt Brace Jovanovich. 1975. ISBN 978-0-15-117034-0.
- Unknown Messages. Nemesis Press. 1973.
- Topography and Other Poems. Harcourt Brace Jovanovich. 1971. ISBN 978-0-15-190495-2.
- In an Iridescent Time. Harcourt, Brace. 1959. LCCN 59-12930.
