= Chard deNiord =

American poet, author, and teacher (born 1952)

- Born: Richard Newnham deNiord III; December 17, 1952 (age 73); New Haven, Connecticut, US
- Education: Lynchburg College (BA); Yale Divinity School (MDiv); Iowa Writers' Workshop (MFA)
- Occupations: Poet, author, and teacher
- Spouse: Elizabeth Hawkes (1971-present)

Richard Newnham "Chard" deNiord III is an American poet, author, and teacher. He is the author of nine poetry collections, two books of interviews with contemporary poets, and a collection of essays on contemporary poetry. He won a Pushcart Prize, was a Poetry Fellow at the Sewanee Writers' Conference, and was Poet Laureate of Vermont 2015–2019. He is a professor emeritus of English and creative writing at Providence College, where he taught 1998–2020.

== Early life and education ==
DeNiord was born on December 17, 1952, in New Haven, Connecticut. He was raised in Lynchburg, Virginia, where he attended Lynchburg College, earning a BA in religious studies. He later received a Master of Divinity from Yale Divinity School, and a Master of Fine Arts from the Iowa Writers' Workshop.

== Career ==
DeNiord was a teacher at The Putney School in Putney, Vermont (1989–1998). He currently is a Professor Emeritus at Providence College in Providence, Rhode Island where he was professor of English and Creative Writing (1998–2020). He also was director (2001–2008) of the low residency program Master of Fine Arts Program in Creative Writing at New England College which he co-founded with Gerald Stern and Jacqueline Gens.

DeNiord is the author of nine poetry collections: Asleep in the Fire (U.of Alabama, 1990), Sharp Golden Thorn (U. of Pittsburgh, 2003), Night Mowing (U. of Pittsburgh, 2005), The Double Truth (U. of Pittsburgh, 2011), Speaking In Turn (NOMON Press, 2011; a collaboration with Tony Sanders), Interstate (U. of Pittsburgh, 2015), In My Unknowing (U. of Pittsburgh, 2020), One As Other (Green Writers Press, 2024), and Westminster West (Tupolo Press, 2025).

He also wrote two collections of interviews with poets and one collection of essays on contemporary poetry. Sad Friends, Drowned Lovers, Stapled Songs (Marick Press, 2011) is a collection of interviews with seven eminent American poets: Robert Bly, Lucille Clifton, Jack Gilbert, Donald Hall, Galway Kinnell, Maxine Kumin, and Ruth Stone. His second book of interviews, I Would Lie To You If I Could: Interviews with Ten American Poets (U. of Pittsburgh, 2018), includes interviews with Natasha Tretheway, Jane Hirshfield, Martin Espada, Stephen Kuusisto, Stephen Sandy, Ed Ochester, Carolyn Forché, Peter Everwine, Galway Kinnell, and James Wright's widow Anne Wright. His book of essays on contemporary poetry is Some Main Things (Mad Hat Press, 2025).

He is a recipient of a Pushcart Prize, and his poems have been included in the anthologies Pushcart Prize XXII (1998), The Best American Poetry 1999, Best of the Prose Poem (2000), American Religious Poems (2006), and American Poetry Now (2007).

He has been a Poetry Fellow at the Sewanee Writers' Conference and the Allan Collins Scholar in Poetry at the Bread Loaf Writers' Conference. DeNiord was the co-founder with Tom Lux and Jacqueline Gens of the Spirit and the Letter Workshop, a ten-day program of workshops and lectures in Patzquaro, Mexico.

DeNiord became a trustee of Poet Laureate of Vermont Ruth Stone's estate on her death in 2011, and helped to found the Ruth Stone House Foundation with her granddaughter Bianca Stone. He was executive producer of Nora Jacobson's 2021 documentary Ruth Stone's Vast Library of the Female Mind.

In 2015, DeNiord was named the Poet Laureate of Vermont and served for four years. In 2022, he was named a Fellow of Vermont's Academy of Arts and Sciences. He has been a board member at the Sundog Poetry Center and essay editor at Plume Poetry Journal.
