= Bianca Stone =

American poet and cartoonist

- Education: Antioch College (BFA); New York University (MFA 2009)
- Occupations: Poet and cartoonist
- Spouse: Ben Pease (m. 2014)
- Relatives: Ruth Stone (grandmother)
- Writing career
- Period: 2012–present
- Notable works: Antigonick (2012, with Anne Carson); Someone Else's Wedding Vows (2014); What Is Otherwise Infinite (2022)
- Notable awards: Poet Laureate of Vermont (2024)
- Website: bianca-stone.com

Bianca Stone is an American poet and cartoonist. Her poems have appeared in literary magazines and poetry collections, and her illustrations are a part of Anne Carson's project Antigonick. In 2024, she became Poet Laureate of Vermont. She is the granddaughter of former Poet Laureate of Vermont Ruth Stone and is creative director of the Ruth Stone House Foundation.

== Early life and education ==
Stone graduated from Antioch College with a BFA in Language, Literature & Culture, where she noted Benjamin S. Grossberg as a key teacher, and she completed an MFA in poetry at New York University in 2009, where she studied under Nobel Prize in Literature winner Anne Carson. Stone's grandmother, the poet Ruth Stone, was the recipient of two Guggenheim Fellowships and the National Book Award for Poetry in 2002, and she remains a major influence in Stone's life.

== Career ==
Stone's poems have been published in Best American Poetry 2011, Conduit, and Tin House, among others, and she is the author of the chapbooks I Want To Open The Mouth God Gave You, Beautiful Mutant (Factory Hollow Press, 2012) and I Saw The Devil With His Needlework (Argos Books, 2012). Tin House Books published Stone's book Someone Else's Wedding Vows in March 2014. Tin House also published her collection The Möbius Strip Club of Grief in 2018, What Is Otherwise Infinite in 2022, and The Near and Distant World in 2026.

She founded and edited a small press for poetry, Monk Books, in 2010 with her husband, the poet Ben Pease, in Brooklyn, New York. She also edited a collection of her grandmother's work, The Essential Ruth Stone, published 2020 by Copper Canyon Press.

Stone is also an illustrator and cartoonist known for creating poetry comics in watercolor and ink. Her illustrations have appeared in a collaboration with former teacher Anne Carson entitled Antigonick, based on Sophocles's tragedy Antigone. This is both a printed book and a multimedia performance piece. I Want To Open The Mouth God Gave You, Beautiful Mutant was a comic book as well as a book of poetry. She adapted Gertrude Stein’s poem “A Little Called Pauline” into a picture book. She created stop motion animations and music for the 2021 movie Ruth Stone's Vast Library of the Female Mind and played a central role in the movie.

She is now based in Vermont, where she co-founded and serves as creative director for the nonprofit Ruth Stone House Foundation and has been a visiting faculty and artist at the Vermont College of Fine Arts. She taught classes on poetry at Dartmouth College, Bennington College, and University of Massachusetts Amherst. With her husband, she now teaches at the Ruth Stone House as well as producing the Ode & Psyche Podcast and the literary magazine ITERANT.

In 2024, Stone became Poet Laureate of Vermont, succeeding Mary Ruefle. In 2025, the Academy of American Poets named her a Poet Laureate Fellow.

== Personal life ==
Stone married fellow poet Ben Pease in August 2014 at her grandmother Ruth Stone's former house in Vermont, now the registered historic place the Ruth Stone House.

== Selected works ==
=== Poetry collections ===
- I Want To Open The Mouth God Gave You, Beautiful Mutant (Factory Hollow Press, 2012)
- I Saw The Devil With His Needlework (Argos Books, 2012)
- Someone Else's Wedding Vows (Tin House, 2014)
- The Möbius Strip Club of Grief (Tin House, 2018)
- What Is Otherwise Infinite (Tin House, 2022)
- The Near and Distant World (Tin House, 2026)

=== Illustrations and animations ===
- with Anne Carson, Antigonick (2012)
- with Nora Jacobson, Ruth Stone's Vast Library of the Female Mind (2021)
