= Enormous Changes at the Last Minute =

1983 film by Mirra Bank, Ellen Hovde and Muffie Meyer

- Directed by: Mirra Bank; Ellen Hovde; Muffie Meyer
- Screenplay by: John Sayles; Susan Rice
- Based on: Enormous Changes at the Last Minute by Grace Paley
- Produced by: Mirra Bank; Terry Benes
- Starring: Kevin Bacon; Ellen Barkin; David Strathairn
- Cinematography: Tom McDonough
- Edited by: Mirra Bank; Ellen Hovde; Muffie Meyer
- Music by: Peter Link
- Production companies: American Broadcasting Company (ABC); Ordinary Lives Inc.
- Distributed by: ABC Circle Films
- Release date: 1983
- Running time: 104 minutes
- Country: United States
- Language: English

Enormous Changes at the Last Minute is a 1983 three-part drama film based on the 1974 short stories of the same name by Grace Paley, which was directed by Mirra Bank, Ellen Hovde and Muffie Meyer. The film stars Kevin Bacon, Ellen Barkin and David Strathairn, among others. The film was released in 1985 in the United States.

== Cast ==
- Kevin Bacon as Dennis
- Maria Tucci as Alexandra
- Ellen Barkin as Virginia
- David Strathairn as Jerry
- Lynn Milgrim as Faith
- Ron McLarty as John Raftery
- Jeffrey DeMunn as Ricardo
- Steven Gilborn as Phillip
- Giancarlo Esposito as Julio

== Release ==
The film was released by ABC. The film was selected at the Toronto International Film Festival in 1983 and London Film Festival.
