= Later the Same Day =

- First edition
- Author: Grace Paley
- Publisher: Farrar, Straus & Giroux
- Publication date: 1985
- Media type: Print (hardback)
- ISBN: 978-0374184094

Later the Same Day is a collection of short fiction by Grace Paley published in 1985 by Farrar, Straus & Giroux.

== Stories ==
The original date of publication and periodical is indicated.

- "Love" (The New Yorker, October 8, 1979)
- "Dreamer in a Dead Language" (American Review, 1977)
- "In the Garden" (Fiction 4 no. 2, 1976)
- "Somewhere Else" (The New Yorker, October 23, 1978)
- "Lavinia: An Old Story" (Delta, 1982)
- "Friends" (The New Yorker, June 18, 1979)
- "At That Time, or The History of a Joke" (Iowa Review, 1981)
- "Anxiety" (New England Review/Bread Loaf Quarterly, 1983)
- "In This Country, but in Another Language, My Aunt Refuses to Marry the Men Everybody Wants Her To" (Threepenny Review, 1983)
- "Mother" (Ms., May 1980)
- "Ruthy and Eddy" (Heresies, 1980)
- "A Man Told Me the Story of His Life" (Poets and Writers 1980 [also called "The Rosebud Book"])
- "The Story Hearer" (Mother Jones, December 1982)
- "This is a Story about My Friend George, the Toy Inventor" (Transatlantic, 1977)
- "Zagrowsky Tells" (Mother Jones, May 1985)
- "The Expensive Moment" (Mother Jones, December 1983)
- "Listening"

== Reception ==
The New Republic's Tyler, Anne, in praising Paley's authorial voice, writes: "She continues to speak in a voice so absolutely her own that a single line, one suspects, could be identified as hers among a hundred other lines."

Reviewer Robert R. Harris at the New York Times Book Review dismisses the several short pieces in the collection as merely clever. The longer work surpasses these with "an honesty and guilelessness...qualities made all the more luminous by an artfully intricate prose style full of surprises."

=== Paley's semi-autobiographical character "Faith Darwin" ===
A key fictional figure in Paley's writing, Faith Darwin. first appeared in the diptych piece "Two Sad Stories from a Long and Happy Life," originally published in The Little Disturbances of Man (1959). Faith functions as both a central and/or peripheral character in about half of Paley's short fiction, serving alternately as "storyteller, story hearer, or bit player."

As a literary invention, Faith represents autobiographical elements from Paley's life. Biographer Neil D. Isaacs cautions readers that conflating Faith Darwin directly with Paley is to risk distorting her literary purpose as intended by the author.

Faith Darwin figures in nine of the 17 tales in Later the Same Day.

== Postmodernist influence ==
Critic Sandy English ranks the collection least among Paley's three short story volumes: "Her final collection is her weakest. There is a postmodernist tendency to fragment plot lines, and a good deal of her prose is interrupted, unsatisfactorily, with poetry."

Biographer Neil D. Isaacs acknowledges the postmodernist elements in Later the Same Day: "[G]race Paley's stories are occasionally metafictional, stories explicitly concerned with the subject of telling stories..." Isaacs declines to treat any of Paley's work critically as such, in that "one method could not grant consideration to each variety of her storytelling forms, not to mention the idiosyncratic nature of each story."

== Sources ==
- English, Sandy. 2007. "Obituary: Grace Paley and political culture." World Socialist Web Site, October 10, 2007. https://www.wsws.org/en/articles/2007/10/pale-o19.html Accessed 31 March, 2026.
- Harris, Robert R.. 1985. "Pacifist With Their Dukes Up." New York Times Book Review, April 14, 1985.https://archive.nytimes.com/www.nytimes.com/books/98/04/19/specials/paley-later.html Accessed 15 April, 2026.
- Isaacs, Neil D. 1990. Grace Paley: A Study of the Short Fiction. Twanyes Publishers, Boston. G. K. Hall & Co., Gordon Weaver, General Editor. ISBN 0-8057-8324-5
- Kakutani, Michiko. 1985. BOOKS OF THE TIMES. New York Times, April 10, 1985. https://www.nytimes.com/1985/04/10/books/books-of-the-times-154281.html Accessed 15 April, 2026.
- Paley, Grace. 1985. Later the Same Day. Farrar, Straus & Giroux, New York. ISBN 978-0374184094.
- Paley, Grace. 2017. A Grace Paley Reader: Stories, Essays, and Poetry. Farrar, Straus and Giroux, New York. ISBN 978-0-374-16582-6
- Schwartz, Alexandra. 2017. "The Art and Activism of Grace Paley." The New Yorker, May 1, 2017. Review of A Grace Paley Reader (2017), edited by Kevin Bowen and Nora Paley. https://www.newyorker.com/magazine/2017/05/08/the-art-and-activism-of-grace-paley Accessed 31 May, 2026.
- Tyler, Anne. 1985. New Republic, April 29, 1985. p. 38-39, in Grace Paley: A Study of the Short Fiction. p. 159. Twanyes Publishers, Boston. G. K. Hall & Co., Gordon Weaver, General Editor. ISBN 0-8057-8324-5
