= Mary Ruefle =

Poet, essayist, professor

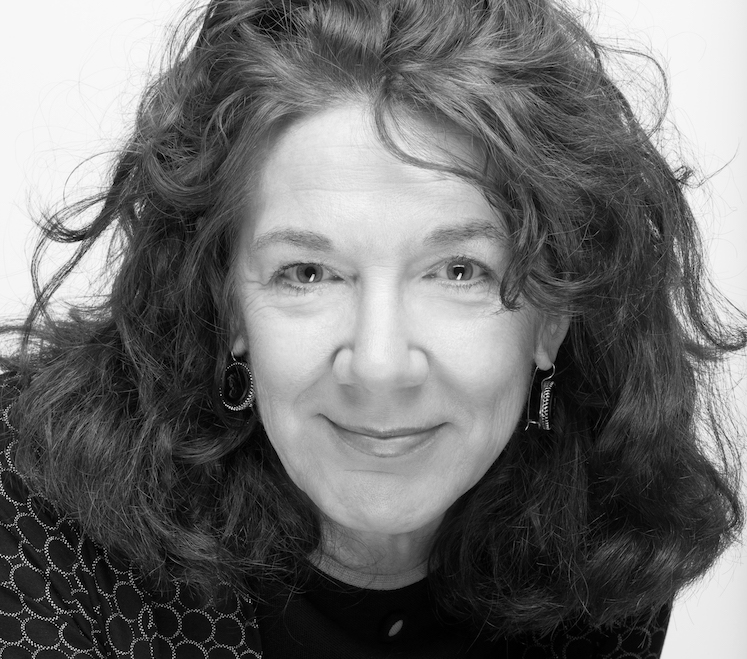
- Mary Ruefle in 2011
- Born: April 16, 1952
- Education: Bennington College (BA)
- Occupations: Writer, Professor
- Writing career
- Genres: Poetry, Non-fiction
- Notable work: Dunce
- Notable awards: William Carlos Williams Award, National Book Critics Circle Award finalist, Pulitzer Prize Finalist

Poet Laureate of Vermont
- In office 2019–2024
- Preceded by: Chard deNiord
- Succeeded by: Bianca Stone
- Website: www.maryruefle.com/menu.html

Mary Ruefle (born April 16, 1952) is an American poet, essayist, and professor. She has published many collections of poetry, the most recent of which, Dunce (Wave Books, 2019), was long-listed for the National Book Award in Poetry and a finalist for the 2020 Pulitzer Prize. Ruefle has also published prose, with her debut collection, The Most Of It, released in 2008. A book of her collected lectures, Madness, Rack, and Honey, was released in 2012, and she published her most recent prose work, The Book, in 2023. Ruefle is known for experimenting with erasure poetry and published an erasure book, A Little White Shadow, in 2006. From 2019 to 2024, she served as the Poet Laureate of Vermont.

Ruefle's work, from poetry to essays, has been published in magazines and journals including The American Poetry Review, Harper's Magazine, The Kenyon Review, The New York Times, and The Paris Review, and in such anthologies as Best American Poetry, Great American Prose Poems (2003), American Alphabets: 25 Contemporary Poets (2006), The Next American Essay (2002), and Poetry Magazine.

== Personal life ==
Ruefle was born in 1952 in McKeesport, Pennsylvania, to a military family. During childhood she moved between and around North America and Europe.

Ruefle has said that she began writing poems at age eight and created her first metaphor by translating an image of the ground into a map. She was writing and reading of her own volition by the time she was 10. Since her childhood involved continuous relocation, she rarely saw her extended family, but continued writing wherever she went. She has said that she dealt with the loneliness that came from constant movement by reading literature.

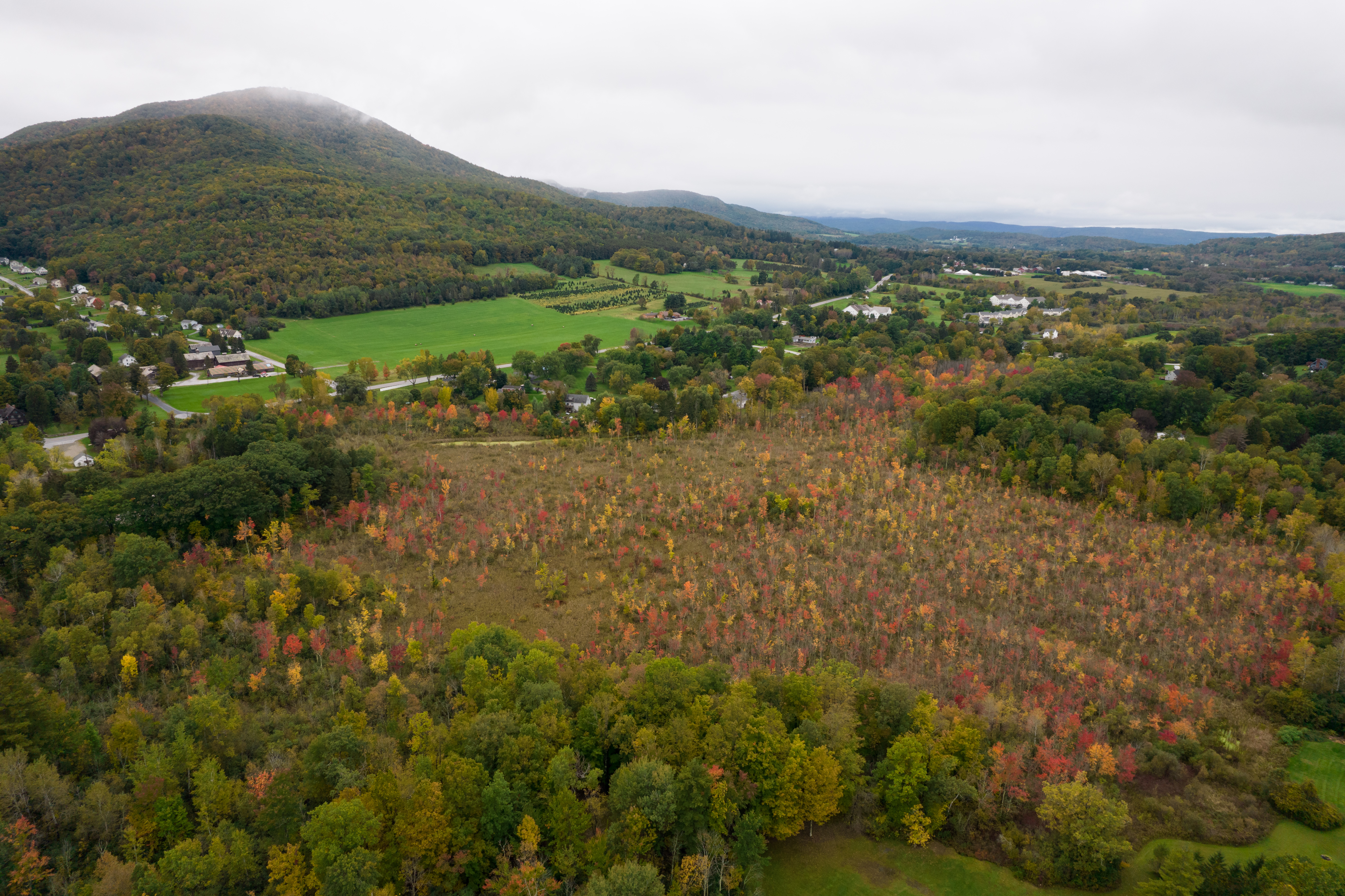
Ruefle lives in Bennington, Vermont.

Because of her childhood, Ruefle does not enjoy moving around. She has lived in Bennington, Vermont, since 1971. She has said that being alone does not bother her and that she likes to maintain her privacy. Ruefle prefers a life with minimal technology and screens, leading her to avoid using computers.

== Education and teaching career ==
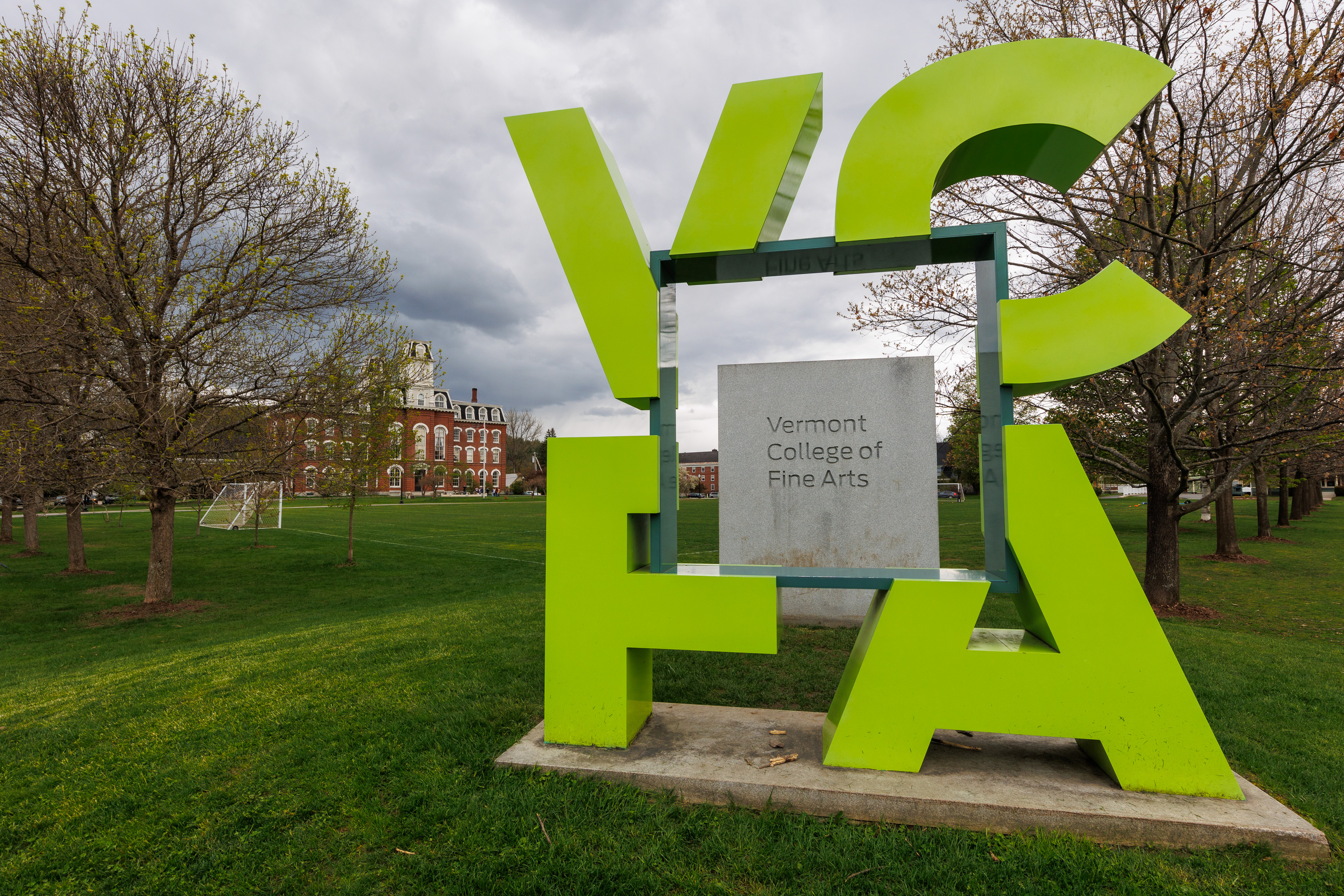
Ruefle spent much of her professorial career at the Vermont College of Fine Arts.

Ruefle graduated from Bennington College in 1974 with a literature degree. She taught there from 1979 to 1988. She also spent 23 years teaching at Vermont College of Fine Arts and returned as a guest poet in the summer of 2018. The University of Iowa's Nonfiction Writing Program hired her as its Bedell Distinguished Visiting Professor in 2011. In 2022, Ruefle served as Bennington College's Ben Belitt Distinguished Visiting Faculty member.

Ruefle has been a guest speaker at a number of U.S. colleges, including Smith College, Stanford University, and the University of Arizona.

== Poet Laureate of Vermont ==
In 2019, Ruefle became the poet laureate of Vermont, succeeding Chard deNiord. She marked this honor by starting a project to mail random poems by a wide range of poets, including Etheridge Knight and former Vermont poet laureates Robert Frost and Louise Glück, to people across the state. She was aiming to mail 1,000 poems in total. She chose recipients from the phone book, and chose poems based on their relevance to current events such as the COVID-19 pandemic and the murder of George Floyd, or based on the recipients' names or street names.

In 2020, Ruefle received an Academy of American Poets' Laureate Fellowship, which included a grant that she said she would use to finish her mailing poems project.

Ruefle was Vermont's poet laureate until 2024, when Bianca Stone took over the role.

== Erasure poetry ==
Ruefle has been writing erasure poetry since 1998, erasing works from the 1800s and 1900s that she buys used. She uses different mediums of erasing, including markers, pictures, and whiteout. She published one set of erasure poems, A Little White Shadow, in 2006. The book is an erasure of Emily Malbone Morgan's book A Little White Shadow. In 2015, See Double Press released another of Ruefle's erasure books, An Incarnation of the Now.

Multiple poetry centers and museums have displayed Ruefle's erasure work, including the Robert Frost Stone House Museum in 2021, the St. Louis Poetry Center in 2022, the Poetry Center at the University of Arizona in 2024, and the Poets House in 2025. The Robert Frost Stone House Museum display included "Stopping", an erasure Ruefle did of Frost's "Stopping by Woods on a Snowy Evening".

In a 2019 interview, Ruefle said that erasing poetry is a regular part of her schedule, calling it "meditative". Her intuition helps her choose which books to erase. In a 2016 interview, she said her preferred genres include "nineteenth-century morally instructive books for children", "biographies of artists", and "anything by Laura Richards". Obscure or unscholarly texts are her ideal erasure materials.

The Paris Review reported that Ruefle had written more than 125 erasure works as of September 2025. The tones in Ruefle's erasure work vary; they have been called "slapstick", "absurd", "lyrical", and "melancholy". She told The Kenyon Review that an element of her erasure work she enjoys is that it is personal: "no one is going to see them!"

== Style and methodology ==
Critics and scholars have assessed and identified signature elements of Ruefle's work, and Ruefle has discussed her procedures and choices in interviews.

=== Themes ===
Ruefle's pieces, from prose to poetry, explore a variety of themes, some of which recur in her work. Her themes often revolve around shared human experiences like love and emotions like loneliness. Death is one such consistent theme, as reflected in Ruefle's essay "I Remember, I Remember" in relation to the passing of her mother. A related theme is that of the process of growing old and individual and social perceptions of aging. Ruefle sees the joys in getting older, saying, "It's total autonomy and freedom, and you become a much stronger person. You're not answerable to anyone anymore", but also tackles the challenges of aging, particularly for women, discussing menopause and the idea of increasing invisibility as women age. The theme of adolescence also appears throughout her work. Many of her poems exhibit a youthful perspective that, Emily Berry of the London Review wrote, creates a "particular combination of delight and melancholy".

Language itself is a theme of Ruefle's work. That the study of literature is not universal has led many of her pieces to address the acts of reading and writing. The difference, or conflict, between personal and public life is another theme in Ruefle's work.

In an interview with Ruefle, Andrew David King of the Kenyon Review highlighted the presence of religion in Ruefle's work. She responded that she is curious about religions even though she is "not religious in the traditional sense of the word".

Ruefle has said that she does not explicitly explore political themes in her poetry.

=== Form ===
Various critics and scholars have called Ruefle's work humorous, allusive, and experimental in its use of language. One characteristic of her style is a tendency to focus on, and often start poems by discussing, simple objects. Critic Emily Berry wrote that "the miniature looms large" in Ruefle's poetry and "everyday objects are sources of fascination". Ruefle has discussed her personal interest and focus on small things, saying, "I love the miniature" and revealing her love of dolls, pins, and paperclips. The Paris Review's Caitlin Youngquist noted that Ruefle uses these simple subjects as springboards for her themes and "larger, existential meditations on sadness and boredom, on language and lullabies and autonomy in old age".

Ruefle experiments with various facets of language in her work, specifically in her poetry where, Berry wrote, "language is, above all, a plaything." Her poetry plays with auditory and visual elements through word choice and line structure. It sometimes contains dialogue or flawed or unusual narrators who reach out to the audience with questions or opinions. Poet David Rivard said of Ruefle, "Even at her most outlandishly playful—and who is more outlandish than Ruefle?—she speaks with an unbelievably sly wisdom." Her work has whimsy and can be viewed as riddles or jokes. Critic Victoria Chang wrote that Ruefle tends to be unconventional as a contemporary poet due to her use of humor, often in the form of comic relief when discussing dark topics. Her work tends to bring about multiple emotions at once, and Chang called Ruefle's work unique: "No one today is writing like Ruefle: her body of work in poetry and prose pricks like a needle that slightly catches the muscle—both painful and immensely delightfully awakening."

Ruefle's writing reflects her personality, as both she and her work are full of "mischief and seriousness" and participate in what poet Alina Ștefănescu has called "irreverent reverence". Critic Donna Vatnick wrote that Ruefle's prose tends to be "simple" and can be considered akin to prose poetry. Critic Albert Mobilio has written that her poetry lacks "sense-breaking imagery or lineation." Her poetry often has an adventurer's spirit and Mobilio called Ruefle's poems "plainly discursive", noting that first-person narration is a frequent feature.

Another element of Ruefle's style, identified by multiple reviewers, is allusion or reference to other authors, including William Carlos Williams, Ikkyu, Cesare Pavese, and John Keats. Moreover, as critic Christina Davis points out, Ruefle sometimes directly incorporates others' work in her own. One poem in her collection Trances of the Blast alludes to Leo Tolstoy and another features a Bashō haiku.

Davis also points out Ruefle's use of tercets and how Ruefle tends to manipulate time in her poetry.

=== Process ===
Ruefle's creative process is driven by intuition and generally lacks a concrete strategy.

Ruefle approaches prose and poetry differently. She collects topics to write about for her prose pieces, but approaches poetry without a specific plan. This is due to her contrasting views of the two forms: "It's different because prose is a public language and poetry is a private language." Ruefle writes poems with the mindset that she has no audience, while her prose is written with the awareness that it will be read.

At first, Ruefle wrote all her poems by hand, and she still handwrites her first drafts. She has said that handwriting is pleasurable due to its physicality, comparing it to the movement of drawing. On rare occasions, Ruefle does what she calls "fake-handwriting": engaging with the movement of handwriting by writing "continuously without actually forming real words".

== Notable works ==
=== Dunce (2019) ===
Ruefle's collection of poems Dunce was published in 2019 and was nominated for several awards, including as a finalist for the Pulitzer Prize for poetry, The National Book Critics Circle Awards, and the Los Angeles Times Book Prize. It was long-listed for the National Book Award for poetry.

Dunce is primarily concerned with dying, reflecting on death as a fate everyone faces and how people come to terms with it. The death of Ruefle's mother is a pervasive theme in the book, and Ruefle broadens the theme to reflect on how others handle loss, recognizing that pain is a shared experience. The poems in Dunce also focus on poems and poets and their disruptive power over time and people, readers, and writers. Ruefle specifically discusses the idea of authority in relation to the readers, asserting that the power of interpretation is in their hands. The collection is also full of memories and thoughts on childhood.

== Awards and honors ==
- 1984 National Endowment for the Arts fellowship.
- 1988 Iowa Poetry Prize for The Adamant
- 1995 Whiting Award
- 1998 Award in Literature from the American Academy of Arts and Letters
- 1999 Frost Place residency
- 2002 Guggenheim fellowship in poetry
- 2007 Lannan Foundation residency
- 2010 Jerome J. Shestack Poetry Prize
- 2011 William Carlos Williams Award for Selected Poems
- 2012 National Book Critics Circle Award finalist in Criticism for Madness, Rack, and Honey
- 2014 Robert Creeley Award
- 2017 Aiken Taylor Award for Modern American Poetry
- 2018 MacDowell Colony Fellowship for poetry
- 2019 Los Angeles Times Book Prize finalist in poetry for Dunce
- 2019 National Book Critics Circle Award finalist in poetry for Dunce
- 2020 Finalist for the Pulitzer Prize in poetry.
- 2020 Academy of Arts and Letters Arthur Rense Poetry Prize
- 2020 Academy of American Poets Laureate Fellowship
- 2023 Vermont Book Award in Creative Non-Fiction for The Book
- 2025 Foundation for the Contemporary Arts' Grants to Artists for poetry

== Published works ==
Full-length poetry collections

- Dunce (Wave Books, 2019)
- From Here to Eternity. Horton Tank Graphics. 2015.
- An Incarnation of the Now. See Double Press. 2015.
- Happy Birthday!. Wave Books. 2013.
- Trances of the Blast (Wave Books, 2013)
- Selected Poems, 2010 (William Carlos Williams Award, 2011)
- Go home and go to bed! : a comic. Pilot Books. 2007.
- Indeed I Was Pleased with the World (Carnegie Mellon University Press, 2007)
- A Little White Shadow (Wave Books, 2006)
- Tristimania (Carnegie Mellon University Press, 2004)
- Apparition Hill (CavanKerry Press, 2002)
- Among the Musk Ox People (Carnegie Mellon University Press, 2002)
- Post Meridian (Carnegie Mellon University Press, 1999)
- Cold Pluto (Carnegie Mellon University Press, 1996; Classic Contemporary version 2001)
- The Adamant (Carnegie Mellon University Press, 1989)
- Life Without Speaking (University of Alabama Press, 1987)
- Memling's Veil (University of Alabama Press, 1982)

Prose collections

- The Book (Wave Books, 2023)
- My Private Property (Wave Books, 2016)
- The Most of It (Wave Books, 2008)

Non-fiction

- Madness, Rack, and Honey Collected Lectures (Wave Books, 2012)

Essays

- "Pause". Granta (131: The Map is Not the Territory). Spring 2015. (Online Edition Only)

Erasure

- An Incarnation of the Now (See Double Press, 2015)
