= Goldie Goldbloom =

Australian writer (born 1964)

Goldie Goldbloom (born 1964) is an Australian Hasidic novelist, essayist and short story writer. She is an LGBT activist and a founding board member of Eshel.

== Early life and education ==
Goldbloom was born in Perth, Western Australia. She is a graduate of theological seminaries in Australia and the United States, and earned an MFA in creative writing from Warren Wilson College. She is a member of the Lubavitch hasidic community. Goldbloom is the mother of eight children. Her grandmother was the West Australian writer Dorrit Hunt, who was made a Life Member of the Fellowship of Australian Writers in 1988.

== Career ==
Goldbloom began writing fiction seriously in her forties, after the birth of her eight children, and in 2011, received the Simon Blattner Fellowship in Creative Writing and World Literature from Northwestern University, following the publication of her novel, The Paperbark Shoe. She then began teaching at Northwestern University and the University of Chicago. Goldbloom's work has been published in Ploughshares, The Kenyon Review, Prairie Schooner, Narrative, Le Monde and StoryQuarterly, among other places. In 2015, her story "The Pilgrim's Way" was included in Black Inc Book's collection The Best Australian Short Stories 2015, edited by Amanda Lohrey. She was an early contributor to G-dcast, and has written for NPR. Her fiction and creative nonfiction have been selected for Keep Your Wives Away From Them (Golden Crown Literary Award, 2011), Inspired Journeys and over a dozen other anthologies.

Her novel The Paperbark Shoe won the Association of Writers and Writing Programs Award for Fiction in 2008 and was placed on the National Endowment for the Arts "Big Read" list in 2018. The novel won the Literary Novel of the Year from the ForeWord Magazine (Independent Publishers) in 2011. Goldie received a Great Lakes College Association New Writers Award in 2010. In 2011, Goldbloom was the Chicago Reader’s Jewish Writer of the Year.

In 2013, she spoke at the International Forum on the Novel, run by Villa Gillet in Lyon, France, on the subject of "Portraits and Faces: Appearance and Disfigurement". Later the same year, she was awarded a National Endowment for the Arts Fellowship in Creative Writing.

Her novel, Gwen, was a finalist for the Aurealis Award for Best Fantasy Novel, the Small Press Network's Most Underrated Book Award, and the Australian Literary Society's Gold Medal in 2018.

Goldbloom received a Brown Foundation Fellowship at Dora Maar House in Menerbes, France, in 2014 and 2024, and won Hunger Mountain's National Nonfiction Award. In 2016, the City of Chicago awarded her an Individual Artist Grant and in 2017, Yaddo and Ragdale selected her for artist's residencies.

Her third novel, On Division, was awarded the Association of Jewish Libraries' Book of the Year prize for 2020. It was also chosen as the San Francisco One Bay One Book selection for 2019–20 and the 2020 Prix des Libraires. The novel was shortlisted for the 2021 Wingate Prize.

== Bibliography ==
- The Paperbark Shoe (2009, Picador; republished 2010, New Issues Poetry & Prose)
- You Lose These and other stories (2011, Fremantle Press)
- Gwen (2017, Fremantle Press)
- On Division (2019, Farrar, Straus and Giroux)

== Awards and honors ==
- (1981) Jerusalem Post International Fiction Prize
- (2008) AWP Novel Award, The Paperbark Shoe
- (2011) Great Lakes College Association New Writers Award, The Paperbark Shoe
- (2011) IndieFab Novel of the Year, The Paperbark Shoe
- (2014) Hunger Mountain Nonfiction Award, "The Chevra"
- (2014) National Endowment for the Arts Fellowship
- (2015) Black Inc Best Australian Short Story, "The Pilgrim's Way"
- (2018) Small Press Network Most Underrated Book Award (shortlist), Gwen
- (2018) Aurealis Award for Best Fantasy Novel (shortlist), Gwen
- (2018) ALS Gold Medal (longlist),Gwen
- (2018) National Endowment for the Arts "Big Read" list, The Paperbark Shoe
- (2019) San Francisco One Bay One Book selection, 2019–2020, On Division
- (2020) Association of Jewish Libraries Book of the Year, On Division
- (2021) Wingate Prize (Shortlist), On Division
- (2021) Laureat du Prix des Libraires, On Division
