= South Lincoln, Vermont =

Census-designated place in Vermont, United States

- Census-designated place
- Location within Vermont Location within the United States
- Coordinates: 44°03′55″N 72°58′29″W
- Country: United States
- State: Vermont
- County: Addison
- Town: Lincoln

Area
  - Total: 2.41 sq mi (6.23 km^{2})
  - Land: 2.37 sq mi (6.15 km^{2})
  - Water: 0.031 sq mi (0.08 km^{2})
- Elevation: 1,385 ft (422 m)
- Time zone: UTC-5 (Eastern (EST))
  - Summer (DST): UTC-4 (EDT)
- ZIP Code: 05443 (Bristol)
- Area code: 802
- FIPS code: 50-67150
- GNIS feature ID: 2805708

South Lincoln is a census-designated place (CDP) within the town of Lincoln, Addison County, Vermont, United States. As of the 2020 census, South Lincoln had a population of 251. It was first listed as a CDP prior to the 2020 census.

It is in eastern Addison County, in the south part of the town of Lincoln, in the valley of the New Haven River, a north-flowing tributary of Otter Creek and part of the Lake Champlain watershed. It is bordered to the south and east by the Green Mountain National Forest. South Lincoln Road leads north (downriver) 3 miles (5 km) to Lincoln, and Ripton Road leads southwest 9 miles (14 km) to Ripton.

== Climate ==
According to the Köppen Climate Classification system, South Lincoln has a warm-summer humid continental climate, abbreviated "Dfb" on climate maps. The hottest temperature recorded in South Lincoln was 96 °F (35.6 °C) on September 1, 2010, while the coldest temperature recorded was −35 °F (−37.2 °C) on January 16–17, 1994 and January 27, 1994.

Climate data for South Lincoln, Vermont, 1991–2020 normals, extremes 1981–present
Month	Jan	Feb	Mar	Apr	May	Jun	Jul	Aug	Sep	Oct	Nov	Dec	Year
Record high °F (°C)	64 (18)	65 (18)	78 (26)	89 (32)	88 (31)	92 (33)	94 (34)	91 (33)	96 (36)	85 (29)	73 (23)	62 (17)	96 (36)
Mean maximum °F (°C)	51.5 (10.8)	49.5 (9.7)	59.4 (15.2)	74.6 (23.7)	81.9 (27.7)	85.5 (29.7)	86.7 (30.4)	84.0 (28.9)	81.8 (27.7)	73.3 (22.9)	64.6 (18.1)	53.5 (11.9)	87.6 (30.9)
Mean daily maximum °F (°C)	25.5 (−3.6)	28.5 (−1.9)	36.6 (2.6)	50.2 (10.1)	63.3 (17.4)	71.3 (21.8)	75.5 (24.2)	74.2 (23.4)	67.0 (19.4)	54.2 (12.3)	43.0 (6.1)	31.7 (−0.2)	51.8 (11.0)
Daily mean °F (°C)	15.6 (−9.1)	17.5 (−8.1)	25.9 (−3.4)	39.4 (4.1)	51.8 (11.0)	60.2 (15.7)	64.7 (18.2)	62.8 (17.1)	55.7 (13.2)	44.4 (6.9)	33.8 (1.0)	22.8 (−5.1)	41.2 (5.1)
Mean daily minimum °F (°C)	5.8 (−14.6)	6.5 (−14.2)	15.3 (−9.3)	28.6 (−1.9)	40.2 (4.6)	49.1 (9.5)	53.9 (12.2)	51.4 (10.8)	44.3 (6.8)	34.5 (1.4)	24.5 (−4.2)	14.0 (−10.0)	30.7 (−0.7)
Mean minimum °F (°C)	−17.0 (−27.2)	−13.6 (−25.3)	−6.7 (−21.5)	14.1 (−9.9)	26.7 (−2.9)	35.9 (2.2)	43.0 (6.1)	40.5 (4.7)	30.5 (−0.8)	21.5 (−5.8)	7.7 (−13.5)	−7.5 (−21.9)	−20.4 (−29.1)
Record low °F (°C)	−35 (−37)	−30 (−34)	−20 (−29)	−8 (−22)	18 (−8)	26 (−3)	34 (1)	29 (−2)	20 (−7)	12 (−11)	−10 (−23)	−28 (−33)	−35 (−37)
Average precipitation inches (mm)	2.95 (75)	2.46 (62)	3.22 (82)	4.06 (103)	4.55 (116)	5.24 (133)	5.34 (136)	5.03 (128)	4.08 (104)	5.06 (129)	3.68 (93)	3.74 (95)	49.41 (1,256)
Average snowfall inches (cm)	25.3 (64)	22.8 (58)	22.0 (56)	6.6 (17)	0.2 (0.51)	0.0 (0.0)	0.0 (0.0)	0.0 (0.0)	0.0 (0.0)	1.5 (3.8)	8.6 (22)	25.5 (65)	112.5 (286.31)
Average extreme snow depth inches (cm)	14.3 (36)	16.8 (43)	16.3 (41)	6.8 (17)	0.2 (0.51)	0.0 (0.0)	0.0 (0.0)	0.0 (0.0)	0.0 (0.0)	1.1 (2.8)	5.6 (14)	11.8 (30)	22.6 (57)
Average precipitation days (≥ 0.01 in)	16.5	13.7	14.5	12.9	14.2	14.8	13.8	12.0	11.2	14.6	14.4	16.8	169.4
Average snowy days (≥ 0.1 in)	13.4	11.3	10.1	3.4	0.3	0.0	0.0	0.0	0.0	1.2	5.6	12.2	57.5
Source 1: NOAA
Source 2: National Weather Service
