= Grace Paley =

American author, poet, teacher, and activist (1922–2007)

- Born: Grace Goodside; December 11, 1922; New York City, US
- Died: August 22, 2007 (aged 84); Thetford, Vermont, US
- Education: Hunter College (no degree); The New School (no degree)
- Occupations: Writer; poet; political activist; teacher
- Spouse(s): Jess Paley; Robert Nichols
- Children: 2
- Writing career
- Notable works: "Goodbye and Good Luck" "The Used-Boy Raisers"
- Notable awards: member, American Academy of Arts and Letters; Poet Laureate of Vermont (2003–2007)

Grace Paley (December 11, 1922 – August 22, 2007), née Goodside, was an American short story author, poet, teacher, and political activist.

Paley wrote three critically acclaimed collections of short stories, which were compiled in the Pulitzer Prize and National Book Award finalist The Collected Stories in 1994. Her stories home in on the everyday conflicts and heartbreaks of city life, heavily informed by her childhood in the Bronx. Paley’s writing is widely recognized for its distinctive authorial voice.

Beyond her work as an author and university professor, Paley was a feminist and anti-war activist, describing herself as a "somewhat combative pacifist and cooperative anarchist."

== Early life and education ==
Grace Paley was born Grace Goodside on December 11, 1922, in the Bronx, to Jewish parents, Isaac Goodside and Manya Goodside (née Ridnyik), who were originally from Ukraine, and espoused socialism, especially her mother. They had immigrated 16 or 17 years earlier (in 1906, by one account), following a period under the rule of Ukraine by Czar Nicholas II that saw their exile, her mother to Germany and her father to Siberia—with the change of name from Gutseit as they began their new life in New York.

The family spoke Russian and Yiddish in the home, and eventually English (which her father learned "by reading Dickens"). Isaac trained and became a doctor in New York, and the couple had two children early, and a third, Grace, as they approached middle age. Fourteen years younger than her sister, Jeanne, and 16 years younger than her brother, Victor, Grace was described as being a tomboy as a child. As a child she was tuned in to the intellectual debates of the adults around her, and she was a member of the Falcons, a socialist youth group.

“Snobbery, arrogance, and status-seeking, were, by all accounts, completely alien to Grace Paley as a person. An empathy for humanity and an attempt to write a ‘history of everyday life,’ as she put it, remain the strengths of her writing.”—Critic Sandy English in the World Socialist Web Site.

After dropping out of high school at age sixteen, Grace Goodside attended Hunter College for a year, in 1938 and 1939. She studied briefly with W. H. Auden, at the New School, when she was 17, hoping to be a poet. She did not receive a degree from either institution.

Goodside married a film cameraman, Jess Paley, when she was 19, on June 20, 1942. The Paleys had two children, Nora (born 1949) and Danny (born 1951), but later divorced. Introducing an interview with Paley in The Paris Review, Jonathan Dee, Barbara Jones, and Larissa MacFarquhar write:

Writing has only occasionally been Paley's main occupation. She spent a lot of time in playgrounds when her children were young. She has always been very active in the feminist and peace movements.

== Writing ==
“Grace Paley is one of the great writers of voice of the last century…What you are experiencing is intimate contact with an extraordinary intelligence, which causes the pleasant sensation of one’s personality receding and being replaced by the writer’s consciousness.”—Author George Saunders, Introduction to The Grace Paley Reader (2017).

Early in her writing career, Paley experienced a number of rejections for her submitted works. She published her first collection, The Little Disturbances of Man (1959) with Doubleday. The collection features eleven stories of New York life, several of which have since been widely anthologized, particularly "Goodbye and Good Luck" and "The Used-Boy Raisers," and introduces the semi-autobiographical character "Faith Darwin" (in "The Used-Boy Raisers" and "A Subject of Childhood")—who later appears in six stories of Enormous Changes at the Last Minute and nine of Later the Same Day. Though as a story collection by an unknown author the book was not widely reviewed, those who did review it, including Philip Roth and The New Yorker book page, tended to rate the stories highly. Despite an initial lack of publicity, Little Disturbances developed a sufficient following for it to be reissued by Viking Press in 1968.

Following the success of Little Disturbances, Paley's publisher encouraged her to write a novel, but she gave up on the attempt after tinkering with drafts for two years. She instead continued to focus on short stories.

With the encouragement of her friend and neighbor Donald Barthelme, Paley assembled a second collection of fiction in 1974, Enormous Changes at the Last Minute, which was published by Farrar, Straus & Giroux. This collection of seventeen stories features several recurring characters from Little Disturbances (most notably the narrator "Faith," but also including John Raftery and his mother), while continuing Paley's exploration of racial, gender, and class issues. The long story "Faith in a Tree," positioned roughly at the center of the collection, brings a number of characters and themes from the stories together on a Saturday afternoon at the park; in it, Faith, the narrator, climbs a tree to get a broader perspective on both her neighbors and the "man-wide world" and, after encountering several war protesters, declares a new social and political commitment. The collection's shifting narrative voice, metafictive qualities and fragmented, incomplete plots have led some critics to classify it as a postmodernist work.

In Later the Same Day (1985), also published by Farrar, Straus & Giroux, Paley continues the stories of Faith and her neighbors—but somewhat expanded, with the addition of more black and lesbian voices.

Paley's stories were regathered in a volume from Farrar, Straus in 1994, The Collected Stories, which was a finalist for the Pulitzer Prize and the National Book Award.

Her work has been characterized as dealing with the day-to-day triumphs and tragedies of "women — mostly Jewish, mostly New Yorkers." As one editor who worked with Paley wrote, "Her characters are people who smell of onions, yell at each other, mourn in darkened kitchens." She wrote what she knew:

"I couldn't help the fact that I had not gone to war, and I had not done the male things. I had lived a woman's life and that's what I wrote about."

Her sharp dialogue is marked by the rhythms of Yiddish, and her stories tend to reflect the "shouts and murmurs of secular Yiddishkeit."

Although more widely known for her short fiction, Paley also published several volumes of poetry including Leaning Forward (1985) and New and Collected Poems (1992). In 1991 she published Long Walks and Intimate Talks, which combined poems and prose writing, and in 2001 she released the collection Begin Again: Collected Poems, which assembled work from throughout her life.

Paley published an essay collection, Just As I Thought, in 1999. She also contributed the piece "Why Peace Is (More Than Ever) a Feminist Issue" to the 2003 anthology Sisterhood Is Forever: The Women's Anthology for a New Millennium, edited by Robin Morgan.

Her final book, the poetry collection Fidelity, was published posthumously in 2008.

== Academic career ==
Paley began to teach writing at Sarah Lawrence College in 1966 (through to 1989) and helped to found the Teachers & Writers Collaborative in New York in the late 1960s. She subsequently served on the faculty at City College and taught courses at Columbia University. She also taught at Syracuse University and served as vice president of the PEN American Center, an organization she'd worked to diversify in the 1980s. Paley summarized her view of teaching during a symposium on "Educating the Imagination," sponsored by the Teachers & Writers Collaborative in 1996:

"Our idea was that children—by writing, by putting down words, by reading, by beginning to love literature, by the inventiveness of listening to one another—could begin to understand the world better and begin to make a better world for themselves. That always seemed to me such a natural idea that I've never understood why it took so much aggressiveness and so much time to get it started."

== Political activism ==
Paley was known for pacifism and for political activism. Her fellow feminist activist Robin Morgan described Paley's activism as broadly focused on social justice: "civil-rights, anti-war, anti-nuclear, feminist, whatever needed revolution." The FBI declared her a communist and kept a file on her for thirty years.

Beginning in the 1950s, Paley joined friends in protesting nuclear proliferation and American militarization. She also worked with the American Friends Service Committee to establish neighborhood peace groups, helping found the Greenwich Village Peace Center in 1961. She met her second husband, Robert Nichols, through the anti-Vietnam War peace movement.

With the escalation of the Vietnam War, Paley joined the War Resisters League. She was arrested on a number of occasions, including spending a week in the Women's House of Detention in Greenwich Village. In 1968, she signed the "Writers and Editors War Tax Protest" pledge, vowing to refuse tax payments in protest against the Vietnam War, and in 1969 she came to national prominence as an activist when she accompanied a peace mission to Hanoi to negotiate the release of prisoners of war. She served as a delegate to the 1973 World Peace Conference in Moscow and was arrested in 1978 as one of "The White House Eleven" for unfurling an anti-nuclear banner that read "No Nuclear Weapons—No Nuclear Power—USA and USSR" on the White House lawn. In the 1980s Paley supported efforts to improve human rights and resist U.S. military intervention in Central America, and she continued to speak out in her final years against the Iraq War.

Among Paley's many other causes was abortion rights, part of her broader feminist work. She organized one of the first "abortion speak-outs" in the 1960s after having an abortion herself in the 1950s and then struggling to obtain a second one a few years later.

== Personal life and final years ==
Paley's Jewish background was a vital part of her identity and work, and she found community in her local synagogue in Vermont in her later years, she was raised agnostic, with her father refusing to go to temple entirely. She described herself as a bigger believer in the Jewish diaspora than in Jewish nationhood, emphasizing: "I was never a Zionist."

Paley's first marriage, to the cinematographer Jess Paley, ended in divorce in 1972 after the couple separated five years prior, though the two remained close friends. She married fellow poet and anti-war activist Robert Nichols later that year. The couple published a joint book expressing their shared activism through poetry and prose, Here and Somewhere Else, in 2007.

Paley was a decades-long resident of West 11th Street in New York's Greenwich Village, where she raised her children, Nora and Danny. She did not learn to drive until she was 55. Paley began spending summers in Thetford, Vermont, with Nichols beginning in the 1970s; the couple eventually settled there permanently in the early '90s, and she became Vermont's state poet in 2003.

Paley died at the age of 84, after undergoing treatment for breast cancer for some time. She was survived by her husband, her two children and three grandchildren. In an interview given in the year of her death, in May 2007, Paley spoke of the dreams she had for her grandchildren, stating the desire for "a world without militarism and racism and greed—and where women don't have to fight for their place in the world."

== Awards and recognition ==
Paley's honors include a Guggenheim Fellowship for Fiction (1961) and the Edith Wharton Award Certification of Merit (1986). She won an O'Henry Award in 1969 for her story "Distance." She was elected to the American Academy of Arts and Letters in 1980.

Paley went on to receive the Rea Award for the Short Story (1993), the Vermont Governor's Award for Excellence in the Arts (1993), PEN/Malamud Award for Excellence in Short Fiction (1994) and the Jewish Cultural Achievement Award (1994). Paley received an honorary degree from Dartmouth University in 1998.

She was named the first official New York State Author in 1986, and she was also named Poet Laureate of Vermont in 2003.

In 2003, she received the Robert Creeley Award. In 2004, as a part of the F. Scott Fitzgerald Literary Festival, Paley received the Fitzgerald Award for Achievement in American Literature. At Dartmouth College's annual Social Justice Awards ceremony in 2006, Paley received the Lester B. Granger '18 Award for Lifetime Achievement.

The Grace Paley Prize, a literary award, is presented by the Association of Writers & Writing Programs in her honor.

=== Homages and adaptations ===
The three-part drama film Enormous Changes at the Last Minute, based on Paley's collection of the same name, was released in 1983.

In 1988, the American composer Christian Wolff set eight poems from Leaning Forward (1985) for soprano, bass-baritone, clarinet/bass-clarinet, and cello. The story "Goodbye and Good Luck" from The Little Disturbances of Man was adapted as a musical by Melba Thomas (story), Muriel Robinson (lyrics), and David Friedman (music); it was performed as a staged reading in New York in 1994.

A documentary film titled Grace Paley: Collected Shorts (2009), directed by Lilly Rivlin, was presented at the Woodstock International Film Festival and other festivals in 2010. The film contains interviews with Paley and friends, footage of her political activities, and readings from her fiction and poetry.

== Bibliography ==
=== Books ===
- The Little Disturbances of Man (short stories, 1959)
- A Subject of Childhood and a conversation with the author in New sounds in American fiction editor Gordon Lish (1969)
- Enormous Changes at the Last Minute (1974)
- Later the Same Day (short stories, 1985)
- Leaning Forward (poetry, 1985)
- 365 Reasons Not to Have Another War (with Vera Williams, nonfiction, War Resisters League 1989 Peace Calendar)
- Long Walks and Intimate Talks (stories and poems, 1991)
- New and Collected Poems (1992)
- The Collected Stories (1994)
- Just As I Thought (semiautobiographical collection of articles, reports, and talks, 1998)
- Begin Again: Collected Poems (2000)
- Fidelity (2008), posthumous

=== Critical studies and reviews of Paley's work ===
- Schwartz, Alexandra (May 8, 2017). "Believe you me : Grace Paley's neighborhood". The Critics. Books. The New Yorker. Vol. 93, no. 12. pp. 66–71. (Note: Online version is titled "The art and activism of Grace Paley".)

———————

=== Short stories ===
Title	Publication	Collected in
"Goodbye and Good Luck"	Accent: A Quarterly of New Literature (Summer 1956)	The Little Disturbances of Man
"The Contest"	Accent: A Quarterly of New Literature (1958)	The Little Disturbances of Man
"A Woman, Young and Old"	The Little Disturbances of Man (April 1959)	The Little Disturbances of Man
"The Pale Pink Roast"	The Little Disturbances of Man (April 1959)	The Little Disturbances of Man
"The Loudest Voice"	The Little Disturbances of Man (April 1959)	The Little Disturbances of Man
"An Interest in Life"	The Little Disturbances of Man (April 1959)	The Little Disturbances of Man
"An Irrevocable Diameter"	The Little Disturbances of Man (April 1959)	The Little Disturbances of Man
"Two Short Sad Stories from a Long Happy Life "1. The Used-Boy Raisers "2. A Subject of Childhood"	The Little Disturbances of Man (April 1959)	The Little Disturbances of Man
"In Time Which Made a Monkey of Us All"	The Little Disturbances of Man (April 1959)	The Little Disturbances of Man
"The Floating Truth"	The Little Disturbances of Man (April 1959)	The Little Disturbances of Man
"Faith in the Afternoon"	The Noble Savage (September 1960)	Enormous Changes at the Last Minute
"Gloomy Tune"	Genesis West (Fall 1962)	Enormous Changes at the Last Minute
"Living"	Genesis West (Winter 1965)	Enormous Changes at the Last Minute
"Northeast Playground"	Ararat Quarterly #8 (1967)	Enormous Changes at the Last Minute
"Faith in a Tree"	New American Review #1 (September 1967)	Enormous Changes at the Last Minute
"Distance"	The Atlantic (December 1967)	Enormous Changes at the Last Minute
"Come On, Ye Sons of Art"	Sarah Lawrence Journal (Winter 1968)	Enormous Changes at the Last Minute
"Samuel"	Esquire (March 1968) ("Two Stories from Five Boroughs")	Enormous Changes at the Last Minute
"The Burdened Man"	Esquire (March 1968) ("Two Stories from Five Boroughs")	Enormous Changes at the Last Minute
"Politics"	Win #4 (1968)	Enormous Changes at the Last Minute
"Debts"	The Atlantic (May 1971) ("Two Stories")	Enormous Changes at the Last Minute
"Wants"	The Atlantic (May 1971) ("Two Stories")	Enormous Changes at the Last Minute
"A Conversation with My Father"	New American Review #13 (1971)	Enormous Changes at the Last Minute
"The Immigrant Story"	Fiction 1.3 (1972)	Enormous Changes at the Last Minute
"Enormous Changes at the Last Minute"	The Atlantic (May 1972)	Enormous Changes at the Last Minute
"The Little Girl"	The Paris Review #57 (Spring 1974)	Enormous Changes at the Last Minute
"The Long Distance Runner"	Esquire (March 1974)	Enormous Changes at the Last Minute
"In the Garden"	Fiction 4.2 (1976)	Later the Same Day
"This Is a Story About My Friend George, the Toy Inventor"	Transatlantic Review #58/59 (1977)	Later the Same Day
"Dreamer in a Dead Language"	American Review #26 (November 1977)	Later the Same Day
"Somewhere Else"	The New Yorker (October 23, 1978)	Later the Same Day
"Friends"	The New Yorker (June 18, 1979)	Later the Same Day
"Love"	The New Yorker (October 8, 1979)	Later the Same Day
"Ruthy and Edie" a.k.a. "Edie and Ruthy"	Heresies: A Feminist Publication on Art and Politics 3.1 (1980)	Later the Same Day
"A Man Told Me the Story of His Life"	Poets & Writers (1980)	Later the Same Day
"Mother" a.k.a. "My Mother"	Ms. (1980)	Later the Same Day
"At That Time, or The History of a Joke"	The Iowa Review #12 (1981)	Later the Same Day
"Lavinia: An Old Story"	Delta #14 (1982)	Later the Same Day
"The Story Hearer"	Mother Jones (December 1982)	Later the Same Day
"Anxiety"	New England Review & Bread Loaf Quarterly 5.4 (Summer 1983)	Later the Same Day
"In This Country, But in Another Language, My Aunt Refuses to Marry the Men Everyone Wants Her To"	The Threepenny Review (Winter 1983)	Later the Same Day
"The Expensive Moment" a.k.a. "The Unknown Parts of Far, Imaginable Places"	Mother Jones (December 1983)	Later the Same Day
"Zagrowsky Tells" a.k.a. "Telling"	Mother Jones (May 1985)	Later the Same Day
"Listening"	Later the Same Day (Spring 1985)	Later the Same Day
"Midrash on Happiness"	TriQuarterly #65 (Winter 1986)	Long Walks and Intimate Talks
"One Morning at Edie's"	Long Walks and Intimate Talks (1991)	Long Walks and Intimate Talks

== Sources ==
- English, Sandy. 2007. ‘Obituary: Grace Paley and political culture.” World Socialist Web Site, October 10, 2007.https://www.wsws.org/en/articles/2007/10/pale-o19.html Accessed 31 March, 2026.
- Isaacs, Neil D. 1990. Grace Paley: A Study of the Short Fiction. Twanye Publishers, Boston. G. K. Hall & Co., Gordon Weaver, General Editor. ISBN 0-8057-8324-5
- Lehmann-Haupt, Christopher. 1974. “Changes Not for the Better. New York Times, February 28, 1974. https://archive.nytimes.com/www.nytimes.com/books/98/04/19/specials/paley-changes.html Accessed 16 April, 2026.
- Paley, Grace. 2017. A Grace Paley Reader: Stories, Essays, and Poetry. Farrar, Straus and Giroux, New York. ISBN 978-0-374-16582-6
- Peden, William. 1974. “The Recent American Short Story.” Sewanee Review 84, 1974 pp. 712-729 in Grace Paley: A Study of the Short Fiction. 1990. p. 173. Twanye Publishers, Boston. G. K. Hall & Co., Gordon Weaver, General Editor. ISBN 0-8057-8324-5
- Saunders, George. 2017. Introduction to The Grace Paley Reader. pp. xv-xxiv. Farrar, Straus and Giroux, New York. ISBN 978-0-374-16582-6
