= Enormous Changes at the Last Minute (short stories) =

1974 short story collection by Grace Paley

- First edition
- Author: Grace Paley
- Genre: Short-story collection
- Publisher: Farrar, Straus and Giroux
- Publication date: 1974
- Media type: Print (hardback)
- Pages: 198
- ISBN: 9780374148515
- OCLC: 968613

Enormous Changes at the Last Minute is a collection of short stories by Grace Paley published in 1974 by Farrar, Straus & Giroux.

The stories in this volume were written while Paley was increasingly engaged in anti-war and anti-nuclear activism during the 1960s and 70s.

"Distance" was included among the 1969 O. Henry Prize Stories.

== Stories ==
The original dates of publication and periodicals are indicated.

- "Wants" (Atlantic, May 1971)
- "Debts" (Atlantic, May 1971)
- "Distance" (Atlantic, December 1967)
- "Faith in the Afternoon" (Noble Savage 2, 1960)
- "Gloomy Tune" (Genesis West 1, 1962)
- "Living" (Genesis West 3, 1965)
- "Come On, Ye Sons of Art" (Sarah Lawrence Journal, Winter 1968)
- "Faith in a Tree" (New American Review 1, 1967)
- "Samuel" (Esquire, 1968, 88 [under "Two Stories from the Five Boroughs"])
- "The Burdened Man" (Esquire, 1968, 89)
- "Enormous Changes at the Last Minute" (Atlantic, May 1972)
- "Politics" (Win 4, 1968)
- "Northeast Playground" (Ararat Quarterly 8, 1967)
- "The Little Girl" (Paris Review 14, 1974)
- "A Conversation with My Father" (New American Review 13, 1972)
- "The Immigrant Story" (Fiction 1, 1972)
- "The Long Distance Runner" (Esquire, 1974)

== Background ==
The success of Paley's 1959 collection The Little Disturbances of Man brought her to the attention of mainstream literary journals including The Atlantic, Esquire and the New American Review.

Postmodernist writer Donald Barthelme has been credited with prompting Paley to assemble her second volume of short fiction.

== Reception ==
Enormous Changes at the Last Minute appeared 15 years after Paley's acclaimed first collection The Little Disturbances of Man (1959) and, as such, was highly anticipated. This second collection elicited high praise from reviewers at New York Times Book Review, The Nation, Newsweek, Partisan Review, and Massachusetts Review, among others.

Biographer Neil D. Isaacs reports that Paley's elevation to a literary and cultural icon during the 1960s—due in part to her left-wing political activism—provoked "reassessments and resentments" among some critics. Negative reviews appeared in Hudson Review, Commentary, and the Times Literary Supplement.

Christopher Lehmann-Haupt, in a New York Times review, laments that Paley's stories had lost the timeless "universality" evidenced in her 1959 collection. Rather than celebrating the "cozy insularity of lower-class life," Enormous Changes at the Last Minute "records the big disturbances of the sixties—the growing brutality of street life, the increasing rawness of language, the falling apart of traditional human relationships." Lehmann-Haupt offered the collection as evidence that Paley "no longer had the strength or will to transmute life into art."

Lehmann-Haupt's review provoked a sharp rebuke from novelist Philip Roth.

[B]y keeping track of the "thoughts" of a Lehmann-Haupt, one can over the years see just which hand-me-down, uncomprehended literary dogma is at work...making fiction accessible and "important" to basically insensate readers like himself.

== Retrospective appraisal ==
Critic Sandy English at the World Socialist Web Site reports that the collection "examined a wider range of ordinary New Yorkers, and tried to accomplish more thematically and technically, but with less success." English reserves especial praise for two pieces: "Distances" and "Faith in a Tree," the latter concerning Faith's political opposition to the Vietnam War.

== Sources ==
- English, Sandy. "Obituary: Grace Paley and political culture". World Socialist Web Site, October 10, 2007. Accessed March 31, 2026.
- Isaacs, Neil D. 1990. Grace Paley: A Study of the Short Fiction. Twanye Publishers, Boston. G. K. Hall & Co., Gordon Weaver, General Editor. ISBN 0-8057-8324-5
- Lehmann-Haupt, Christopher. "Changes Not for the Better". The New York Times, February 28, 1974. Accessed April 16, 2026.
- Paley, Grace. 1974. Enormous Changes at the Last Minute. Farrar, Straus and Giroux, New York. ISBN 9780374148515.
- Paley, Grace. 2017. A Grace Paley Reader: Stories, Essays, and Poetry. Farrar, Straus and Giroux, New York. ISBN 978-0-374-16582-6
- Saunders, George. 2017. Introduction to The Grace Paley Reader. pp. xv–xxiv. Farrar, Straus and Giroux, New York. ISBN 978-0-374-16582-6
- Roth, Philip. "Imagining Jews". New York Review of Books, October 3, 1974. Accessed April 30, 2026.
- Schwartz, Alexandra. "The Art and Activism of Grace Paley". The New Yorker, May 1, 2017. Review of A Grace Paley Reader (2017), edited by Kevin Bowen and Nora Paley. Accessed May 31, 2026.
