= Bread Loaf, Vermont =

- Unincorporated community
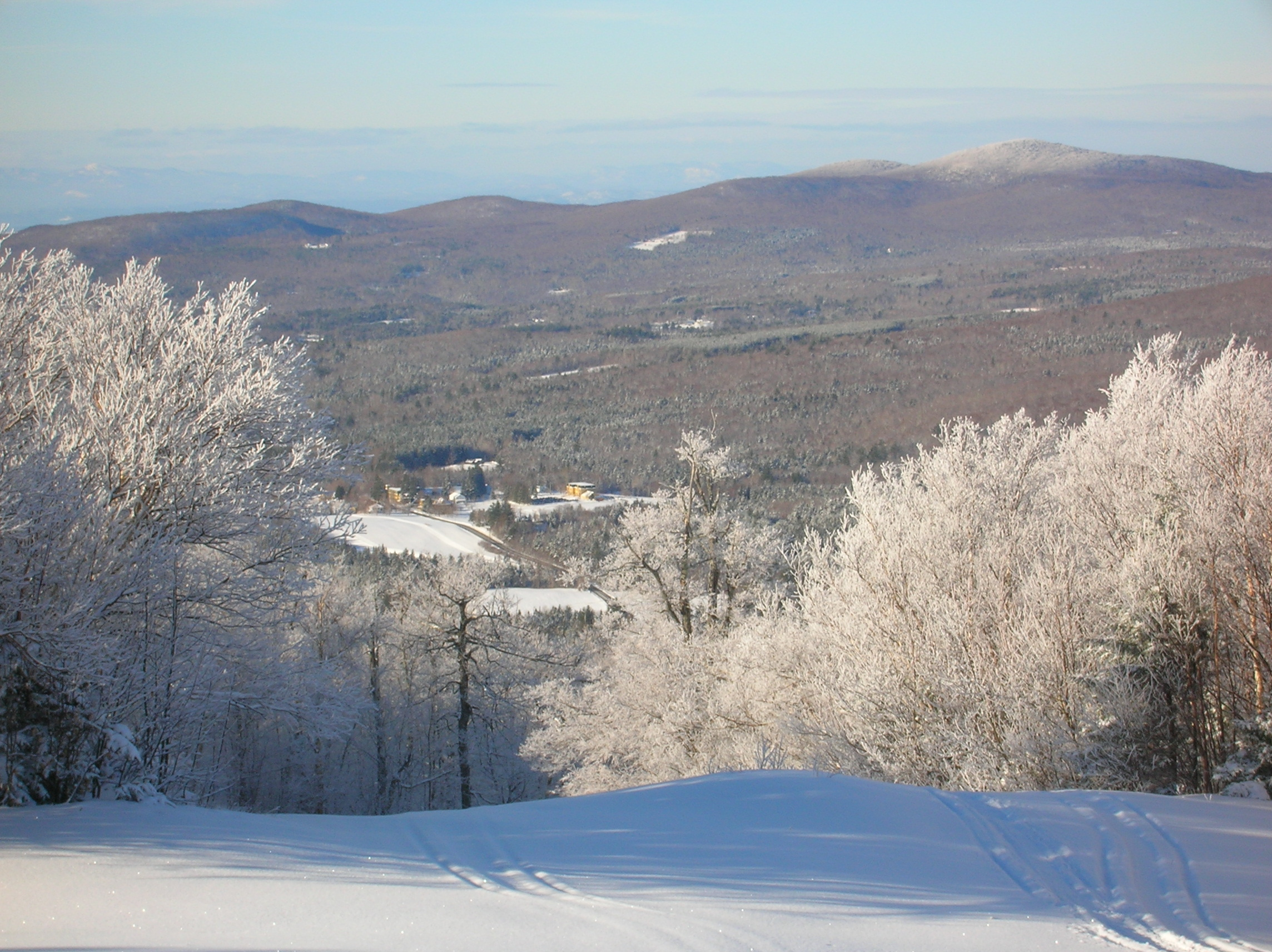
- Bread Loaf Campus from Snow Bowl

- Location within Vermont
- Coordinates: 43°57′12″N 72°59′33″W
- Country: United States
- State: Vermont
- County: Addison
- Town: Ripton
- Elevation: 1,431 ft (436 m)
- Time zone: UTC-5 (Eastern (EST))
  - Summer (DST): UTC-4 (EDT)
- GNIS feature ID: 1460655

Bread Loaf is an unincorporated community within the town of Ripton in Addison County, Vermont, United States. The community is on the west flank of Bread Loaf Mountain. The community formerly had a post office.(dead link)

The Bread Loaf Writers' Conference, sponsored by Middlebury College, occurs annually in Bread Loaf.
