= Goshen, Vermont =

- Town
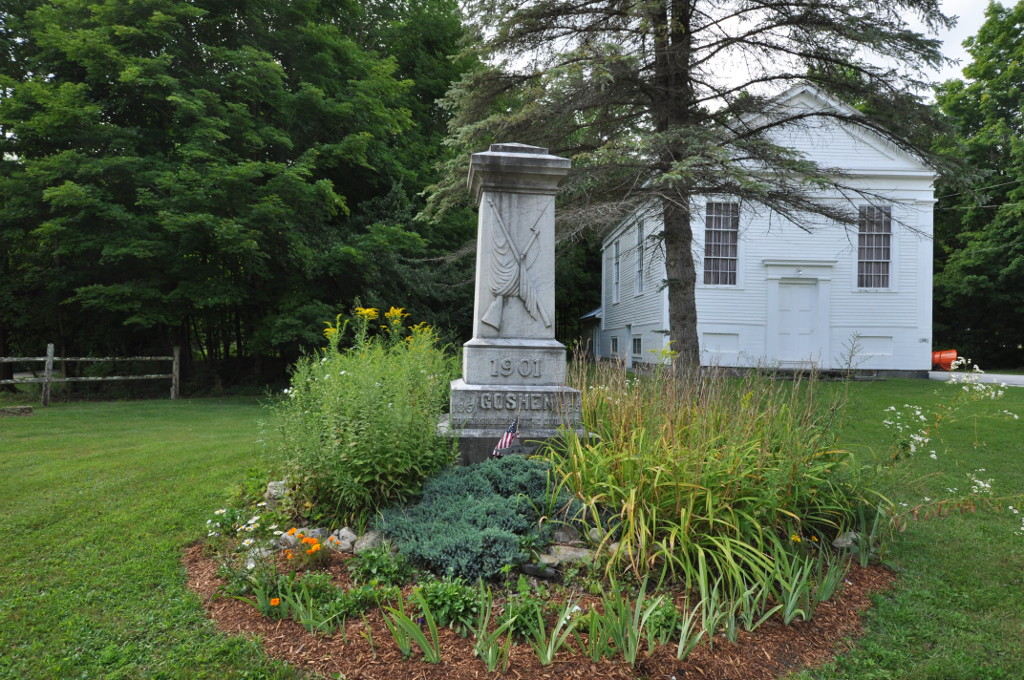
- War Memorial and Town Hall

- Seal

- Location in Addison County and the state of Vermont
- Coordinates: 43°52′41″N 73°00′17″W
- Country: United States
- State: Vermont
- County: Addison

Area
  - Total: 20.8 sq mi (53.9 km^{2})
  - Land: 20.7 sq mi (53.5 km^{2})
  - Water: 0.15 sq mi (0.4 km^{2})
- Elevation: 1,693 ft (516 m)

Population (2020)
  - Total: 172
  - Density: 8.3/sq mi (3.2/km^{2})
- Time zone: UTC-5 (Eastern (EST))
  - Summer (DST): UTC-4 (EDT)
- ZIP code: 05733
- Area code: 802
- FIPS code: 50-28600
- GNIS feature ID: 1462104
- Website: goshenvt.org

Goshen /ˈɡoʊʃən/ is a town in Addison County, Vermont, United States. The population was 172 at the 2020 census.

== Geography ==
Goshen is located in southern Addison County, within the Green Mountains. It is bordered by the town of Leicester to the west, Salisbury to the northwest, Ripton to the north, and Hancock to the northeast. To the east is the town of Rochester in Windsor County, and to the south and southwest, in Rutland County, are the towns of Chittenden and Brandon, respectively.

Settlements in the town include Goshen, near the town's western border, and Goshen Four Corners, in the center of the southern part of town. Vermont Route 73 runs east–west through Goshen, passing through Goshen Four Corners, and crossing the crest of the Green Mountains at Brandon Gap (elevation 2,183 ft or 665 m) near the town's eastern border. The Long Trail crosses Route 73 at Brandon Gap and passes over the summits of Mount Horrid (3,216 ft or 980 m) and Cape Lookoff Mountain (3,350 ft or 1,020 m) within Goshen. Goshen Mountain (3,292 ft or 1,003 m) is in the southeastern corner of the town. Most of Goshen lies within the Green Mountain National Forest.

According to the United States Census Bureau, Goshen has a total area of 20.8 square miles (53.9 km^{2}), of which 20.7 square miles (53.5 km^{2}) is land and 0.15 square miles (0.4 km^{2}), or 0.78%, is water.

== Demographics ==
Historical population
Census	Pop.	Note	%±
1800	4		—
1810	86		2,050.0%
1820	290		237.2%
1830	555		91.4%
1840	621		11.9%
1850	486		−21.7%
1860	394		−18.9%
1870	330		−16.2%
1880	326		−1.2%
1890	311		−4.6%
1900	286		−8.0%
1910	212		−25.9%
1920	131		−38.2%
1930	84		−35.9%
1940	83		−1.2%
1950	94		13.3%
1960	76		−19.1%
1970	120		57.9%
1980	163		35.8%
1990	226		38.7%
2000	227		0.4%
2010	164		−27.8%
2020	172		4.9%
U.S. Decennial Census

As of the census of 2000, there were 227 people, 84 households, and 57 families residing in the town. The population density was 10.7 people per square mile (4.1/km^{2}). There were 114 housing units at an average density of 5.4 per square mile (2.1/km^{2}). The racial makeup of the town was 96.48% White, 0.44% African American, 0.44% Native American, 0.88% Asian, 0.88% from other races, and 0.88% from two or more races. Hispanic or Latino of any race were 0.88% of the population.

There were 84 households, out of which 33.3% had children under the age of 18 living with them, 59.5% were married couples living together, and 32.1% were non-families. 17.9% of all households were made up of individuals, and 8.3% had someone living alone who was 65 years of age or older. The average household size was 2.70 and the average family size was 3.07.

In the town, the age distribution of the population shows 26.4% under the age of 18, 4.0% from 18 to 24, 22.9% from 25 to 44, 37.4% from 45 to 64, and 9.3% who were 65 years of age or older. The median age was 43 years. For every 100 females, there were 108.3 males. For every 100 females age 18 and over, there were 111.4 males.

The median income for a household in the town was $36,500, and the median income for a family was $58,750. Males had a median income of $32,500 versus $25,938 for females. The per capita income for the town was $17,031. None of the families and 9.3% of the population were living below the poverty line, including no under eighteens and 45.5% of those over 64.

== Notable people ==
- Francis G. Parks, Vermont and Wisconsin state legislator was born in Goshen
- Ruth Stone, poet and author
