= Robert Nichols (author) =

American architect and writer (1919–2010)

Robert Nichols (July 15, 1919 – October 14, 2010) was an American architect, novelist, playwright, poet and short story writer.

== Early life, military service and education ==
Born Robert Brayton Nichols in Worcester, Massachusetts, July 15, 1919, Nichols served as an officer in the United States Navy in World War II, and attended and earned two degrees from Harvard University, the first a bachelors and the second in landscape architecture.

== Career ==
Nichols's work in landscape architecture includes a redesign of Washington Square Park in the Manhattan borough of New York City.

His poetry includes the volumes Red Shift (1977), and Slow Newsreel of Man Riding Train (1962, number 15 in the City Lights Pocket Poets Series).

He also wrote the short story collection, In the Air (1991), and novels, including From the Steam Room (1993), and a four-part series of novellas set in the utopia Nghsi-Altai. This series is called Daily Lives in Nghsi-Altai and consists of Book I: Arrival (1977), Book II: Garh City (1978), Book III: The Harditts in Sawna (1979), and Book IV: Exile (1979).

Nichols was a co-founder of the New York City's Judson Poets Theatre, and participated in the Theater for the New City and the Bread and Puppet Theater.

== Personal life ==
Nichols's first marriage was to the Village Voice editor, Mary Perot Nichols, which ended in divorce in 1969. Nichols married writer Grace Paley in 1972, and they remained married until her death in 2007.
