= Poet Laureate of Vermont =

Officially appointed poet

- Incumbent; Bianca Stone since 2024
- Type: Poet laureate
- Formation: 1961
- First holder: Robert Frost

The poet laureate of Vermont is the poet laureate for the U.S. state of Vermont.

Robert Frost was the first poet named as laureate by Joint House Resolution 54 of the Vermont General Assembly in 1961, less than two years before his death. The position of state poet, a four-year appointment, was created by Vermont Governor Madeleine Kunin's Executive Order 69 in 1988. In 2007, on the new investiture of Ruth Stone in the position, Vermont Governor Jim Douglas changed the position's title to poet laureate. The title of poet laureate is now used retroactively to describe prior state poets.

In 1989, the same year the first state poet was appointed since Robert Frost, a concurrent position of Vermont Poet Laureate was created by the Poetry Society of Vermont and awarded to William D. Mundell. This position was recognized by the state legislature in a 1998 joint resolution after his death in 1997.

== List of poets laureate ==
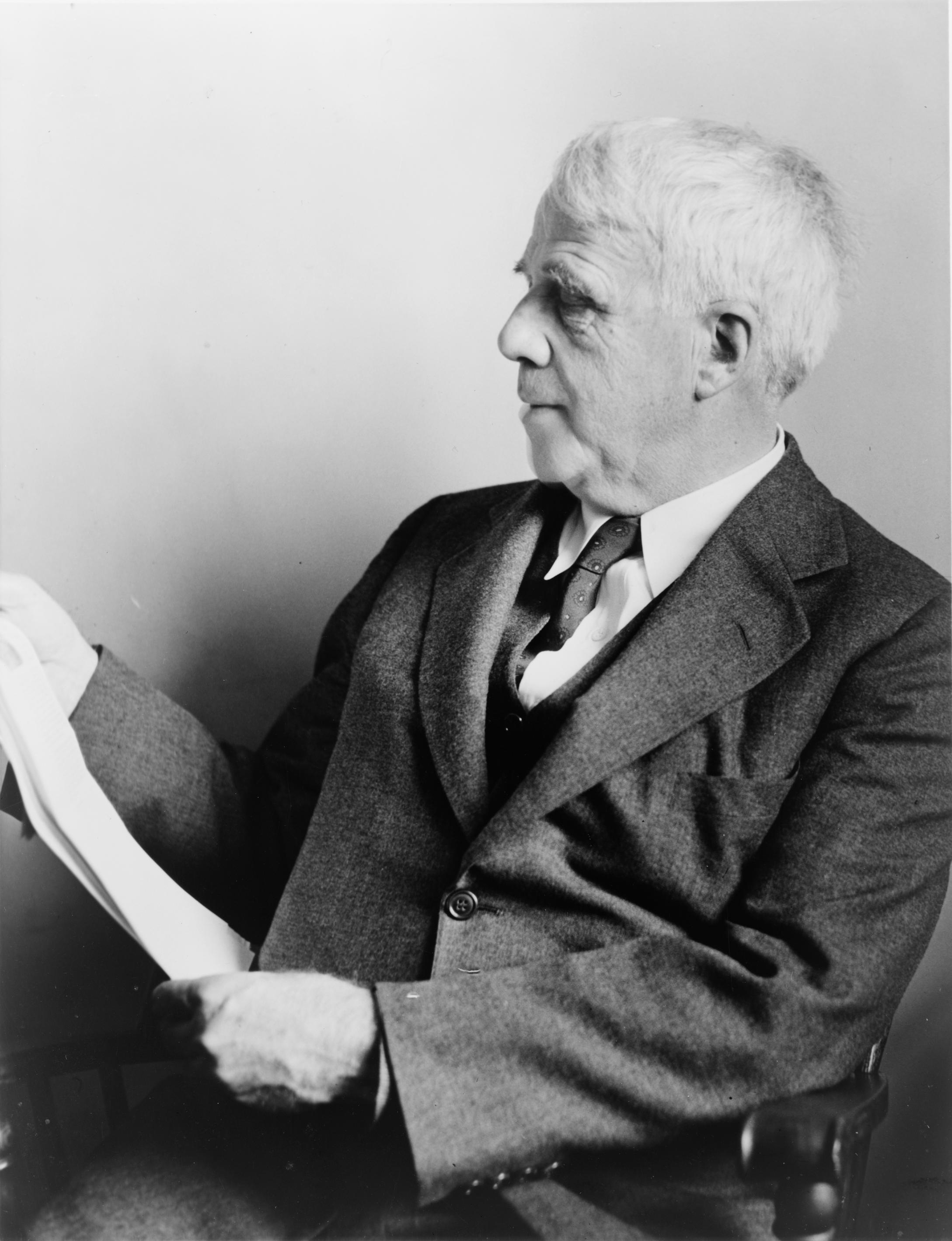
Robert Frost was the first poet laureate of Vermont.

The following held the Vermont state poet position:

- Robert Frost (1961–1963)
- Galway Kinnell (1989–1993)
- Louise Glück (1994–1998)
- Ellen Bryant Voigt (1999–2002)
- Grace Paley (2003–2007)

The following held the Vermont poet laureate position:

- Ruth Stone (2007–2011)
- Sydney Lea (2011–2015)
- Chard deNiord (2015–2019)
- Mary Ruefle (2019–2024)
- Bianca Stone (2024–present)

In addition to these, William D. Mundell held a separate office of Vermont Poet Laureate 1989–1997.

== See also ==
- Poet laureate
- List of U.S. state poets laureate
- United States Poet Laureate
