= Ellen Bryant Voigt =

American poet (1943–2025)

- Born: Ellen Yeatts Bryant; May 9, 1943; Chatham, Virginia, U.S.
- Died: October 23, 2025 (aged 82); Berlin, Vermont, U.S.
- Education: Converse University (BA); University of Iowa (MFA)
- Spouse: Fran Voigt
- Writing career
- Genre: poetry
- Notable awards: Poet Laureate of Vermont, MacArthur Fellow

Ellen Bryant Voigt, née Ellen Yeatts Bryant (May 9, 1943 – October 23, 2025), was an American poet. She served as the Poet Laureate of Vermont 1999–2002.

== Biography ==
Voigt was born May 9, 1943, in Danville, Virginia. She grew up in Chatham, Virginia, graduated from Converse College, and received an M.F.A. from the University of Iowa. She taught at M.I.T. and Goddard College, where in 1976 she developed and directed the nation's first low-residency M.F.A. in Creative Writing program. Since 1981 she taught in the Warren Wilson College MFA Program for Writers.

She published seven collections of poetry and a collection of craft essays. Her poetry collections Shadow of Heaven (2002) and Messenger (2007) were finalists for the National Book Award and Kyrie (1995) was a finalist for the National Book Critics Circle Award. Messenger was also a finalist for the 2008 Pulitzer Prize. Her poetry has been published in several national publications. She served as the Poet Laureate of Vermont for four years and in 2003 was elected a Chancellor of the Academy of American Poets. In 2015, Voigt was awarded a MacArthur Fellowship. Her latest collection is Collected Poems (2023).

She was married to Francis (Fran) Voigt, an administrator at Goddard College, until his death in 2018. Their two children are Dudley and Will Voigt. She resided in Cabot, Vermont, and St. Paul, Minnesota.

Voigt died in Berlin, Vermont, on October 23, 2025, at age 82.

== Bibliography ==
- Ellen Bryant Voigt (1 March 1976). Claiming Kin. Wesleyan University Press. ISBN 978-0-8195-6961-5.
- The Forces of Plenty, Carnegie Mellon University Press, 1983; Carnegie Mellon University Press, 1996, ISBN 9780887482274
- The Lotus Flowers: Poems (New York: W.W. Norton & Company, 1987. ISBN 0-393-02445-8)
- Two Trees W. W. Norton, Incorporated, 1992, ISBN 9780393311006
- Kyrie, W.W. Norton, 1995, ISBN 9780393037968
- Shadow of Heaven (New York: W.W. Norton & Company, 2002)
- Messenger: New and Selected Poems 1976-2006. W. W. Norton. 17 July 2008. ISBN 978-0-393-06982-2.
- The Flexible Lyric. University of Georgia Press. 15 March 2011. ISBN 978-0-8203-4006-7. (essays)
- Headwaters: Poems. W. W. Norton & Company. 21 October 2013. ISBN 978-0-393-08320-0.

=== Poems ===
- "Owl", 2013.

== Awards and honors ==
- MacArthur Fellowship, 2015
- National Endowment for the Arts grant recipient
- Guggenheim Foundation grant recipient
- Academy of American Poets Fellowship, 2001
- Vermont Arts Council grant recipient
- Pushcart Prize
- Lila Wallace-Reader's Digest Fund fellowship
- Poet Laureate of Vermont, 1999–2002
- O. B. Hardison, Jr. Poetry Prize, 2002
- Elected Chancellor of The Academy of American Poets, 2003
