= Sydney Lea =

American poet (born 1942)

- Born: December 22, 1942 (age 83); Chestnut Hill, Pennsylvania, U.S.
- Education: Yale University (BA, MA, PhD)
- Occupations: poet, writer, editor, academic
- Writing career
- Subject: New England
- Notable works: Pursuit of a Wound; To the Bone: New and Selected Poems
- Notable awards: Governor's Award for Excellence in the Arts; Poet Laureate of Vermont; Poets' Prize
- Website: sydneylea.net

Sydney Lea (born December 22, 1942) is an American poet, novelist, essayist, editor, and professor. He was the founding editor of the New England Review and was the Poet Laureate of Vermont from 2011 to 2015. Lea's writings focus the outdoors, woods, and rural life New England and "the mysteries and teachings of the natural world."

== Early life ==
Sydney Lea was born in Chestnut Hill, Pennsylvania. Growing up, his father had a camp in Washington County, Maine.

Lea attended Yale University, graduating with a B.A. in 1964. While there, he was a member of the social and literary fraternity, St. Anthony Hall. Later, he received a Ph.D. in comparative literature from Yale. Robert Penn Warren was his mentor.

== Career ==
Lea taught at Dartmouth College from 1969 to 1976. He then taught at Middlebury College from 1976 to 1989 and at Yale University in 1979. He was a professor in the MFA program at the Vermont College of Fine Arts from 1989 to 2002. However, during that time, he also taught at Eotvos Lorand University in Budapest, Hungary while on a Fulbright Scholarship in 1992, at Wesleyan University in 1997, and at Franklin College in Lugano, Switzerland in 2001. He returned to Dartmouth from 1999 to 2002, becoming a professor in its graduate program in liberal studies from 2003 to 2011.

In 1977, Lea co-founded the New England Review with Jay Parini in and edited it until 1989. His work has appeared in literary journals and magazines including The New Yorker, The Atlantic, The Los Angeles Review, The New Republic, The New York Times, Sports Illustrated, and Virginia Quarterly Review.

In 1987, Lea received a Guggenheim Fellowship for poetry. In 1996, his poetry collection To the Bone: New and Selected Poems was co-winner of the Poets' Prize. His collection of poetry Pursuit of the Wound, published in 2000, was a Pulitzer Prize finalist.

Lea became Poet Laureate of Vermont in 2011. The Advisory Committee who recommended him for the four-year position found "Lea's poetry to be virtuosic in texture and form, yet likely to be engaging to a diversity of readers and listeners because of the work's dramatic intensity, narrative momentum, and musicality, and because of this poet's extraordinarily evocative descriptions of northern New England's landscapes, animal and plant life, and the seasonal panorama." The committee also said, "Through all of his books, Lea has paid particular attention to the stories of generations living alongside one another in north-country villages, including the interactions of 'old-timers' and relative newcomers. He continues the tradition of Vermont poets who are both singular — one of a kind—and broadly accessible."

In a review of his 2013 poetry collection, I Was Thinking of Beauty, Jacqueline Kolosov notes, "For Lea, the moral and aesthetic cannot be separated. Though he is honest about his flaws and shortcomings in his poetry—one reason he quickly wins and sustains his readers' trust—his poems strive to teach us how to live while making us laugh at our need to take ourselves so seriously."

His work across the genres has appeared in some sixty anthologies. the composer Joseph Hallman turned Lea's poem "Mudtime" into a long-form song cycle for voice and string quartet. Lea described as "a high point of my term as poet laureate. It was so refreshing and so different, a great shot in the arm." It premiered in 2014 by Hallman's long-term collaborator, Abigail Haynes-Lennox and the 802 Quartet at the Vermont College of Fine Arts. Lea has since collaborated with the Vermont Contemporary Music Ensemble on a number of multimedia presentations.

Lea's thirteenth collection of poetry, Here, was published by Four Way Books in 2019. In a review of Here, Publishers Weekly writes, "Lea weaves a graceful tapestry of personal history while expressing his trademark wonder at the natural world in his quietly powerful 13th collection. His memories are not grand in scale; he recalls watching his daughter spill a glass of milk on a train, teaching his son to ride a bike, and schoolboy shenanigans such as a “slew of idiot tricks” pulled on a Latin instructor—yet these scenes become significant through Lea's telling."

His 2020 book, The Exquisite Triumph of Wormboy, is a graphic mock-epic poem in collaboration with former Vermont Cartoonist Laureate James Kochalka. Released in 2021, Seen From All Sides is a collection of newspaper essays Lea wrote between 2011 and 2015 while he was the Poet Laureate of Vermont.

In 2021, Lea received the Governor's Award for Excellence from the Vermont Arts Council. This award "is reserved for artists both distinguished in their field, and who have had a profound impact on the state of Vermont."

== Honors and awards ==
- 2021, Governor's Award for Excellence in the Arts, Vermont Arts Council
- 2012: Conservation Hero, Field and Stream magazine
- 2011 Poet Laureate of Vermont
- 2001 Pulitzer Prize for Poetry finalist for Pursuit of a Wound
- 1998 Poets' Prize, for To the Bone: New and Selected Poems
- 1992 Fulbright Scholarship, Eotvos Lorand University, Budapest
- 1987 Guggenheim Fellowship, Siena, Italy
- 1985 Rockefeller Foundation Fellowship, Bellagio Center

== Personal life ==
In the early 1990s, Lea moved to Vermont. He lives in Newbury, Vermont and has a camp in Washington County, Maine. He has five adult children.

He has served as the vice president of Central Vermont Adult Basic Education. He is also active in the conservation effort in Washington County, Maine, helping to raise funds for the Downeast Lakes Land Trust. He is currently a trustee emeritus of the Vermont College of Fine Arts.

He plays the blues harmonica.

== Bibliography ==
=== Poetry ===
Collections

- Searching the Drowned Man. University of Illinois Press, 1980. ISBN 978-0252007965
- The Floating Candles: Poems. University of Illinois Press, 1982 ISBN 9780252009761
- To the Summer Sweethearts. Press at Colorado College, 1985.
- No Sign. University of Georgia Press,1987. ISBN 9780820341606
- Prayer for the Little City: Poems. Scribner's, 1989. ISBN 9780684191294.
- The Blainville Testament. Story Line Press. 1992. ISBN 978-0-934257-80-0.
- To the Bone: New and Selected Poems. University of Illinois Press, 1996. ISBN 978-0-252-06519-4
- Pursuit of a Wound. University of Illinois Press, 2000. ISBN 978-0-252-06817-1
- Ghost Pain: Poems. Sarabande Books, 2005. ISBN 978-1-932511-14-7
- Under Drum Ice, A Selection of Poems in Slovenian, translation by Marjan Strojan. 2006
- Young of the Year. Four Way Books, 2011. ISBN 9781935536109
- Six Sundays toward a Seventh: No Selected Spiritual Poems. Cascade Books, 2012. ISBN 9781498214469
- I Was Thinking of Beauty. Four Way Books, 2013. ISBN 9781935536314
- No Doubt the Nameless. Four Way Books, 2016. ISBN 1935536737.
- Here. Four Way Books, 2019. ISBN 978-1945588402

Children's verse

- The Exquisite Triumph of Wormboy. Illustrated by James Kochalka. Word/Galaxy, 2020. ISBN 978-1773490496

Anthologies (edited)

- The Bread Loaf Anthology of Contemporary American Poetry. with Robert Pack and Jay Parini. University Press of New England, 1985. ISBN 978-0874513509

List of poems

Title	Year	First published	Reprinted/collected
Inviting the moose : a vision	????		Lea, Sydney (2001). "Inviting the moose : a vision". In Weingarten, Roger & Richard Higgerson (eds.). Poets of the new century. David R. Godine, Publisher. p. 208.
Back when I was you	2025	Lea, Sydney (Winter 2025). "Back when I was you". 32 Poems. 44: 13.	

=== Novels ===
- A Place in Mind. Story Line Press. 1997. ISBN 978-1-885266-39-2. 1st edition Scribner's 1989

=== Short fiction ===
- "Mercy on Beeson's Partridge." The Virginia Quarterly Review, vol. 70, no. 3, 1994, pp. 541–55.
- “Presences.” Prairie Schooner, vol. 64, no. 1, 1990, pp. 74–83.

Anthologies edited

- The Nomads: Tales From Africa. with Morgan Chipopu. Zambian P.E.N. Center, 2006.

=== Non-fiction ===
Books

- Gothic to Fantastic: Readings in Supernatural Fiction. Ayer Publishing, 1980. ISBN 978-0-405-12653-6
- The Burdens of Formality: Essays on the Poetry of Anthony Hecht. University of Georgia Press, 1988. ISBN 978-0820310916
- Hunting the Whole Way Home: Essays and Poems. Lyons Press, 2002. ISBN 978-1-58574-560-9
- A Little Wildness: Some Notes On Rambling. Story Line Press. 2006. ISBN 978-1-58654-046-3.
- A Hundred Himalayas: Essays on Life and Literature. University of Michigan, 2012, ISBN 978-0-472-07188-3
- A North Country Life: Tales of Woodsmen, Waters, and Wildlife. Skyhorse/Simon & Schuster, 2013. ISBN 9781616088637
- What’s the Story? Reflections on a Life Grown Long. Green Writers Press, 2015. ISBN 978-0990973393
- Growing Old in Poetry: Two Poets, Two Lives. with Fleda Brown. Green Writers Press. 2018. ISBN 978-0-9994995-5-9
- Seen From All Sides: Lyric and Everyday Life. Green Writers Press, 2021. ISBN 978-1-7320815-0-5

Essays and reporting

- "The Death Of A Hunting Dog", Sports Illustrated, December 2, 1991.
- "Living with the Stories: Bonness Verbatim." Prairie Schooner, vol. 70, no. 1, Spring 1996, p. 160.
- "Introduction." The Breath of Parted Lips: Voices from Robert Frost Place, Volume 2. CavanKerry Press, 2004. ISBN 978-0-9678856-8-1
- "The Pragmatist's Prayer." Image Journal. Issue 55, 2005.
- "Weathers and Places: Essay." Numéro Cinq. vol. 2, no. 3, March 2011.
- "Unskunked: An Essay." Numéro Cinq. vol. 3, no. 3, March 2012.
- "Becoming a Poet: A Way to Know." Numéro Cinq. vol. 3, no. 9, September 2012.
- "A Short Sad Story: Essay." Numéro Cinq. vol. 3, no. 12, December 2012.
- "Pony and Graveyard: A Dream of the Flesh." Numéro Cinq. vol. 4, no. 2, February 2013.
- "Mrs. Ragnetti and the Spider: Essay." Numéro Cinq. vol. 4, no. 10, October 2013.
- "Sex & Death: Essay on the Uncanny." Numéro Cinq. vol. 5, no. 2, February 2014.
- "The Serpent on Barnet Knoll: Three Essays." Numéro Cinq. vol. 5, no. 6, June 2014.
- "River, Stars, and Blessed Failure" Numéro Cinq. vol. 6, no. 2, February 2015.
- "Sixty Steps from Yale." Numéro Cinq. vol. 7, no. 6, June 2016.
