= Hunger Mountain =

American literary magazine

- Discipline: Literary magazine
- Language: English
- Edited by: Adam McOmber

Publication details
- History: Fall 2002 to present
- Publisher: Vermont College of Fine Arts (United States)
- Frequency: Tri-annually online, annually in print

Standard abbreviations
- ISO 4: Hunger Mt.

Indexing
- ISSN: 1539-9931

Links
- Journal homepage

Hunger Mountain is an American literary magazine founded in 2002 by Caroline Mercurio. A member of the Community of Literary Magazines and Presses, Hunger Mountain is based in Montpelier, Vermont at The Vermont College of Fine Arts, one of the top-ranked low residency MFA (Master of Fine Arts) programs in the country.

Originally published in Spring and Fall, there is now a yearly print issue as well as online issues. Hunger Mountain publishes fiction, poetry, creative nonfiction, young adult and children's writing, and visual art. The online issues also showcase author interviews and craft essays.

Reading period is from May 1 to October 1, during which time general submissions are accepted.

== History ==
Hunger Mountain is named for a mountain in Middlesex, Vermont. According to legend, a group of men who went hunting on this mountain always returned home hungry, having caught only one quail between them. This mountain can be seen from many vantage points in Montpelier, where Hunger Mountain the magazine is located. The initial goals of the magazine were to call attention to established and emerging writers, while also highlighting local Vermont writers and artists. The journal was founded in 2002 by Caroline Mercurio and was made possible through a generous donation from a Vermont College of Fine Arts MFA in Writing alumnus. The premiere issue, released in the fall of 2002, included work by Wally Lamb, Maxine Kumin, and an interview with Grace Paley. Miciah Bay Gault took over as managing editor in 2009 and Samantha Kolber began her post as managing editor in July 2015.

== Current masthead ==
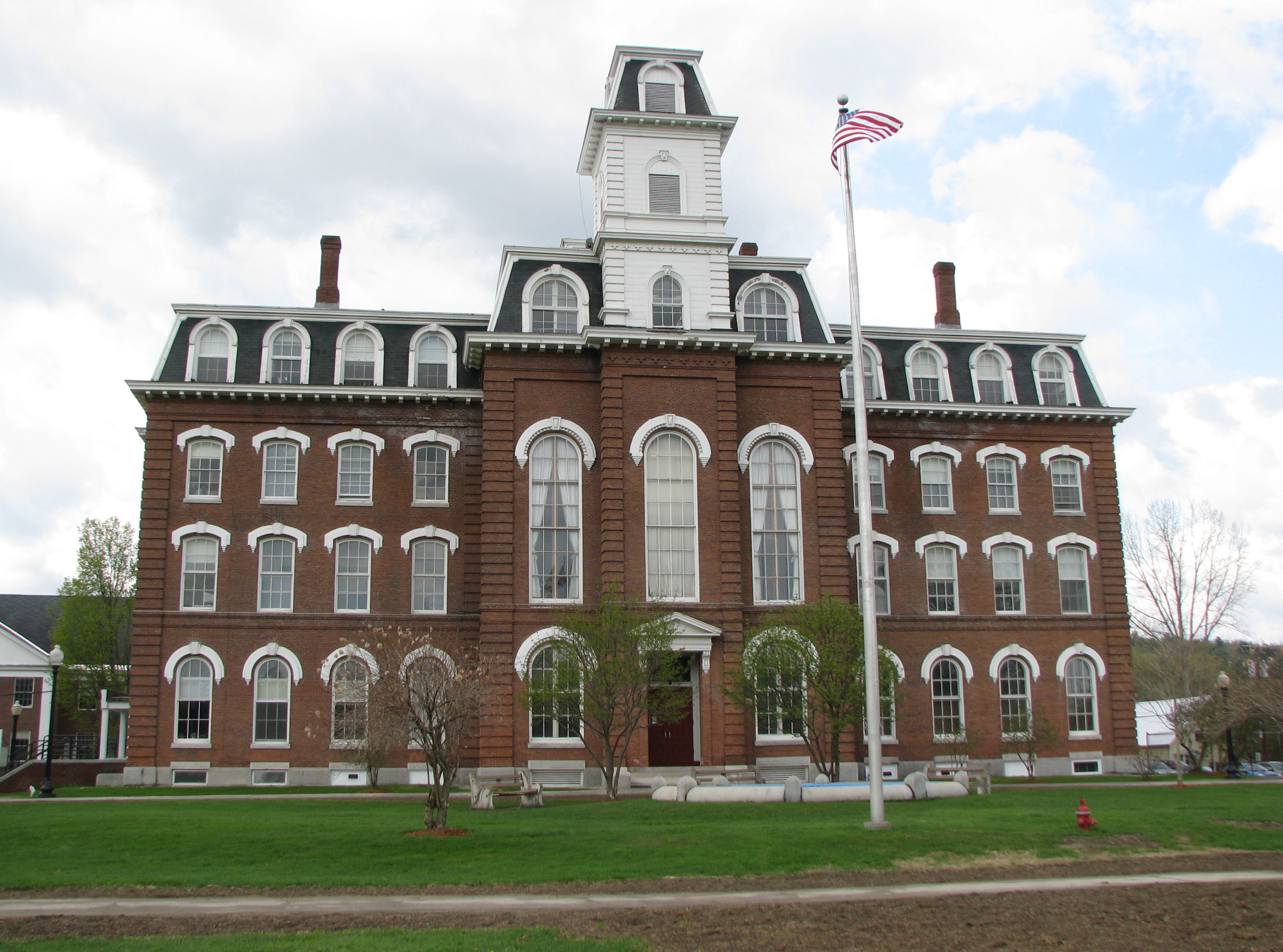
College Hall, where the Hunger Mountain offices are housed.

- Adam McOmber, editor, fiction editor
- Tomás Q. Morín, poetry editor
- Sue William Silverman, creative nonfiction editor
- Allison Grimaldi Donahue, translations editor
- Jonathan Smith, managing editor

== Writing contests ==
Each year, Hunger Mountain sponsors four writing contests for different genres. The entry deadline for each contest is March 1.

- The Howard Frank Mosher Short Fiction Prize
- The Ruth Stone Poetry Prize
- The Hunger Mountain Creative Nonfiction Prize
- The Katherine Paterson Prize for Young Adult/Children's Literature

== Past contributors ==
Contributors to Hunger Mountain have received and been nominated for numerous accolades, among them MacArthur Fellowship Grants, Guggenheim Fellowships, Pushcart Prizes, PEN/O'Henry Prizes, and National Endowment for the Arts Fellowship in Fiction.

- Pinckney Benedict
- Michael Burkard
- Ron Carlson
- Hayden Carruth
- Kwame Dawes
- Matthew Dickman
- Mark Doty
- Rita Dove
- Philip Graham
- Alison Hawthorne Deming
- Terrance Hayes
- Robin Hemley
- Bob Hicok
- Tony Hoagland
- Alice Hoffman
- Pam Houston
- David Huddle
- Maxine Kumin
- Peter LaSalle
- Dorianne Laux
- Sydney Lea
- Paul Lisicky
- Bret Lott
- Michael Martone
- Howard Frank Mosher
- Naomi Shihab Nye
- Ann Pancake
- Katherine Paterson
- Edith Pearlman
- Lucia Perillo
- Marge Piercy
- George Saunders
- Dani Shapiro
- Charles Simic
- Patricia Smith
- Terese Svoboda
- James Tate
- Samrat Upadhyay
- Jean Valentine
- Laura van den Berg
- Tobias Wolff
- Charles Wright
- Dean Young
