= Mount Horrid =

Mountain in Vermont, United States

Coordinates: 43.8504°N 72.9670°W

Mount Horrid is a summit in Addison and Windsor counties, Vermont in the United States. With an elevation of 3,205 feet (977 m), Mount Horrid is the 83rd highest summit in the state of Vermont.

Peregrine falcons make their nests in the Great Cliffs of Mount Horrid. A moderately difficult trail leads hikers to the Great Cliffs.
