= Ruth Stone House =

Historic house in Vermont, United States

- U.S. National Register of Historic Places
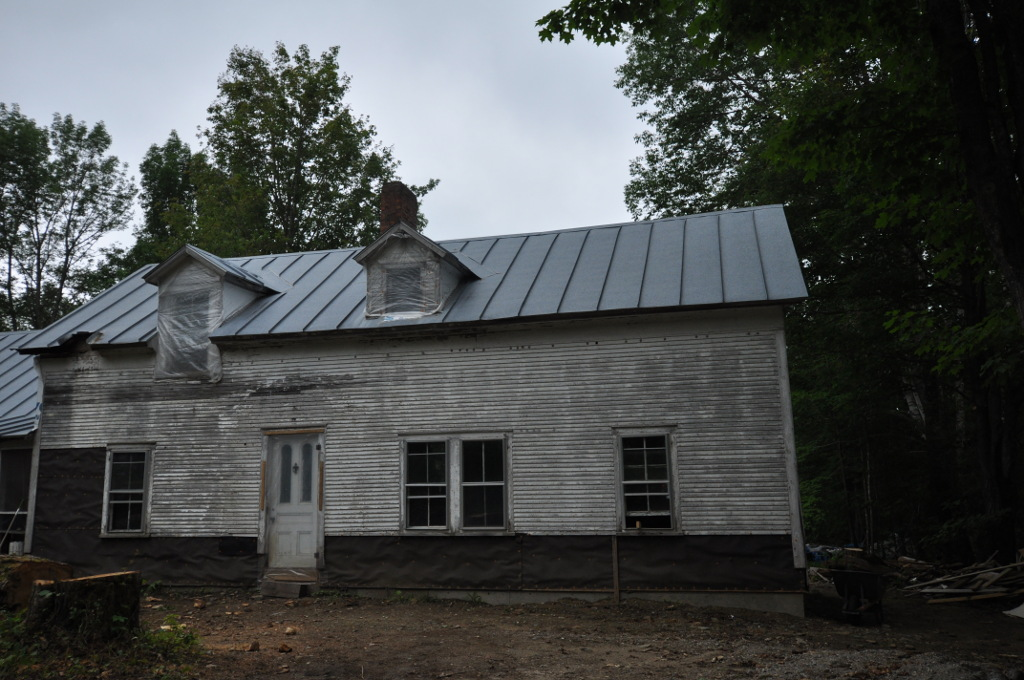
- House under renovation in 2017

- Location within Vermont Location within the United States
- Location: 788 Hathaway Rd., Goshen, Vermont
- Coordinates: 43°51′12″N 72°59′55″W
- Area: 3 acres (1.2 ha)
- Built: 1796
- NRHP reference No.: 16000791
- Added to NRHP: November 22, 2016

The Ruth Stone House is a historic house at 788 Hathaway Road in Goshen, Vermont. This 19th-century farmhouse was for many years the home of poet Ruth Stone (1915–2011). Since her death, the property has been taken over by the Ruth Stone Foundation, established in 2013 to manage her legacy. The organization's intent is to establish the house as a writer's retreat. It was listed on the National Register of Historic Places in 2016.

== Description and history ==
The Ruth Stone property straddles Hathaway Road, a gravel road in the rural mountain community of Goshen, Vermont. The property is about 3 acres (1.2 ha) in size, and includes the Stone residence and two smaller guest residences. The main house, a vernacular farmhouse built about 1830, is located on the south side of Hathaway Road, with the informally marked grave of Ruth Stone nearby to the southwest. Across Hathaway Road are two other buildings: the "Little House", apparently an early 19th-century barn converted into residential use, and the "Chapel", a 20th-century vernacular structure built using salvage materials by Stone's family and friends as a studio and retreat.

The property was the principal residence of poet Ruth Stone from 1956 until her death in 2011. Stone's work went largely unrecognized until late in her life, when she won two National Book Awards, Guggenheim Fellowships, and was Vermont's poet laureate 2007–11. It was here that she wrote much of her poetry, and worked with writers and poets. The property is a place associated with the life and work of one of Vermont's poets.

== See also ==
- National Register of Historic Places listings in Addison County, Vermont
