= Kevin Bowen =

American football player (born 1993)

No. 72, 77, 79
- Position: Offensive tackle

Personal information
- Born: July 3, 1993 (age 33); San Diego, California
- Listed height: 6 ft 9 in (2.06 m)
- Listed weight: 335 lb (152 kg)

Career information
- High school: Helix (La Mesa, California)
- College: East Central
- NFL draft: 2015: undrafted

Career history
- Washington Redskins (2015–2017); Cleveland Browns (2018)*; Columbus Destroyers (2019); St. Louis BattleHawks (2020)
- * Offseason or practice squad member only
- Stats at Pro Football Reference

Kevin Bowen (born July 3, 1993) is an American former football offensive tackle. He played college football at East Central University. Bowen was signed by the Washington Redskins as an undrafted free agent in 2015.

== Professional career ==
=== Washington Redskins ===
On May 6, 2016, the Washington Redskins signed Bowen as an undrafted free agent after going unselected in the 2016 NFL draft. The team waived/injured him on August 18, 2016. After clearing waivers, the Redskins placed him on injured reserve.

Bowen was waived/injured again on August 12, 2017. He was unclaimed and placed on the team's injured reserve for the second consecutive season.

On March 6, 2018, Bowen was waived by the Redskins.

=== Cleveland Browns ===
On July 30, 2018, Bowen signed with the Cleveland Browns. He was waived on August 28, 2018.

=== Columbus Destroyers ===
Bowen was assigned to the Columbus Destroyers of the Arena Football League on May 22, 2019. He was placed on recallable reassignment on July 1, 2019.

=== St. Louis BattleHawks ===
Bowen was drafted by the St. Louis BattleHawks in the 2020 XFL Supplemental Draft on November 22, 2019. He was placed on injured reserve on December 18, 2019. He had his contract terminated when the league suspended operations on April 10, 2020.
