= Ararat Quarterly =

American literary magazine

- Ararat Quarterly special issue on William Saroyan
- Categories: Magazine
- Frequency: Quarterly
- Publisher: Armenian General Benevolent Union
- First issue: 1959
- Final issue: 2008
- Country: United States
- Language: English

Ararat Quarterly (1959–2008) was an international quarterly of literature, history, popular culture and the arts published in English

The quarterly was published by the Armenian General Benevolent Union (AGBU) in New York, NY.
