= The Little Disturbances of Man =

1959 short story collection by Grace Paley

- First edition
- Author: Grace Paley
- Genre: Short story collection
- Publisher: Doubleday
- Publication date: 1959
- Media type: Print (hardback)
- Pages: 189
- ISBN: 978-9997413246

The Little Disturbances of Man is a collection of short stories by Grace Paley first published in 1959 by Doubleday.

The volume created a minor sensation among a number of literary critics and is now widely considered to comprise some of Paley's finest work.

== Stories ==
Publishing history for selected stories is provided in Grace Paley: A Study of the Short Fiction. Twanye Publishing, Boston. G. K. Hall & Co., Gordon Weaver, General Editor. ISBN 0-8057-8324-5

- "Goodbye and Good Luck"
- "A Woman Young and Old"
- "The Pale Pink Roast"
- "The Loudest Voice"
- "The Contest"
- "An Interest in Life"
- "An Irrevocable Diameter"
- "Two Short Sad Stories from a Long and Happy Life"
  - 1. "The Used-Boy Raisers"
  - 2. "A Subject of Childhood"
- "In Time Which Made a Monkey of Us All"
- "The Floating Truth"

== Publishing background ==
Biographer Alexandra Schwartz reports that the publication of the ten stories was serendipitous:

Paley counted the publication of The Little Disturbances of Man as a stroke of luck. She had been rejected by more than a dozen journals before an editor at Doubleday whose kids were friends with hers asked to see what she was working on.

Prior to their appearance in Little Disturbances, two of the stories were published in the journal accent: Paley's first published story, completed when she was age 33, is "Goodbye and Good Luck" (accent 16, 1956) and another, "The Contest" (accent 18, 1958).

The Little Disturbances of Man has been translated into several languages, including German, Spanish, French and Swedish.

== Reception ==
The release of Little Disturbances was well-received by a number of critics, quickly earning Paley a reputation as a "writer's writer."

New York Times reviewer Patricia Macmanus called the publication of Little Disturbances "a welcome event" and praised Paley's "well-defined and artfully guileless form of narrative progression."

== Theme ==
"Grace Paley described the lives of ordinary New Yorkers in the postwar period more ably than almost any other writer of her generation. She wrote in an ironic tone that implied, at its best, that there were historical processes latent within the travails of daily life."—Critic Sandy English in "Obituary: Grace Paley and political culture," World Socialist Web Site.

According to biographer Neil D. Isaacs, the title of the collection may be ironic: the "little disturbances" concerns "the major stressors in contemporary life," primarily a societal failure to establish gender equality.

[T]he "of man" [in the title] cuts two ways; how little are men disturbed by sexist patterns of society and how little are women essentially diminished despite being much put upon.

Reviewer Patricia Macmanus locates the collection's essence in an "all-too-infrequent literary virtue—the comic vision."

[T]he heart of the matter in these tales is their serio-comic stance: character revealed through the wry devices that man contrives, consciously and unconsciously, to shore up his uncertain existence and, sometimes, to salvage laughter from lamentation.

=== Semi-autobiographical character "Faith Darwin" ===
A key fictional figure in Paley's writing, Faith Darwin first appeared in the diptych piece "Two Sad Stories from a Long and Happy Life," originally published in The Little Disturbances of Man. Faith appears as a central or peripheral character in about half of Paley's short fiction, serving alternately as "storyteller, story hearer, or bit player." As a literary invention, Faith represents autobiographical elements from Paley's life.

Biographer Neil D. Isaacs cautions readers that conflating Faith Darwin directly with Paley is to risk distorting her literary purpose as intended by the author.

== Retrospective appraisal ==
Critic Renee Winegarten, writing in Mainstream (December 1974) attested to the favorable treatment the collection received on its release, and ranked Paley's "intelligent, individual, independent voice" with that of Mark Twain's novel Huckleberry Finn (1884).

New York Times literary critic Christopher Lehmann-Haupt, writing in 1974, considered Paley at the apex of her creative powers with The Little Disturbances of Man, noting "fifteen years after publication, not a work of the book seems dated."

Critic Sandy English declares in his obituary for Paley: "Her first collection of stories, The Little Disturbances of Man, remains her best.".

== Sources ==
- English, Sandy. 2007. "Obituary: Grace Paley and political culture." World Socialist Web Site, October 10, 2007. https://www.wsws.org/en/articles/2007/10/pale-o19.html Accessed 31 March, 2026.
- Harris, Robert R. 1985. "Pacifist With Their Dukes Up." New York Times, April 14, 1985.https://archive.nytimes.com/www.nytimes.com/books/98/04/19/specials/paley-later.html Accessed 15 April, 2026.
- Isaacs, Neil D. 1990. Grace Paley: A Study of the Short Fiction. Twanyes Publishing, Boston. G. K. Hall & Co., Gordon Weaver, General Editor. ISBN 0-8057-8324-5
- Kakutani, Michiko. 1985. BOOKS OF THE TIMES. New York Times, April 10, 1985. https://www.nytimes.com/1985/04/10/books/books-of-the-times-154281.html Accessed 15 April, 2026.
- Lehmann-Haupt, Christopher. 1974. "Changes Not for the Better. New York Times, February 28, 1974. https://archive.nytimes.com/www.nytimes.com/books/98/04/19/specials/paley-changes.html Accessed 16 April, 2026.
- Macmanus, Patricia. 1959. "Laughter From Tears; THE LITTLE DISTURBANCES OF MAN." New York Times, April 19, 1959.https://www.nytimes.com/1959/04/19/archives/laughter-from-tears-the-little-disturbances-of-man-by-grace-paley.html Access 20 April, 2026.
- Paley, Grace. 1959. The Little Disturbances of Man. Doubleday, New York. ISBN 978-9997413246.
- Paley, Grace. 2017. A Grace Paley Reader: Stories, Essays, and Poetry. Farrar, Straus and Giroux, New York. ISBN 978-0-374-16582-6
- Saunders, George. 2017. Introduction to The Grace Paley Reader. pp. xv-xxiv. Farrar, Straus and Giroux, New York. ISBN 978-0-374-16582-6
- Schwartz, Alexandra. 2017. "The Art and Activism of Grace Paley." The New Yorker, May 1, 2017. Review of A Grace Paley Reader (2017), edited by Kevin Bowen and Nora Paley. https://www.newyorker.com/magazine/2017/05/08/the-art-and-activism-of-grace-paley Accessed 31 May, 2026
- Winegarten, Renee. 1974. "Paley's Comet." Mainstream 20, December 1974. pp. 65-67. in Grace Paley: A Study of the Short Fiction. 1990. p. 155. Twanye Publishers, Boston. G. K. Hall & Co., Gordon Weaver, General Editor. ISBN 0-8057-8324-5
