= Ruth Stone's Vast Library of the Female Mind =

2021 documentary film by Nora Jacobson

Ruth Stone's Vast Library of the Female Mind is a 2021 documentary film about the life and work of American poet Ruth Stone. The film was directed by Nora Jacobson.
