= Ripton, Vermont =

Town in the United States

- Town
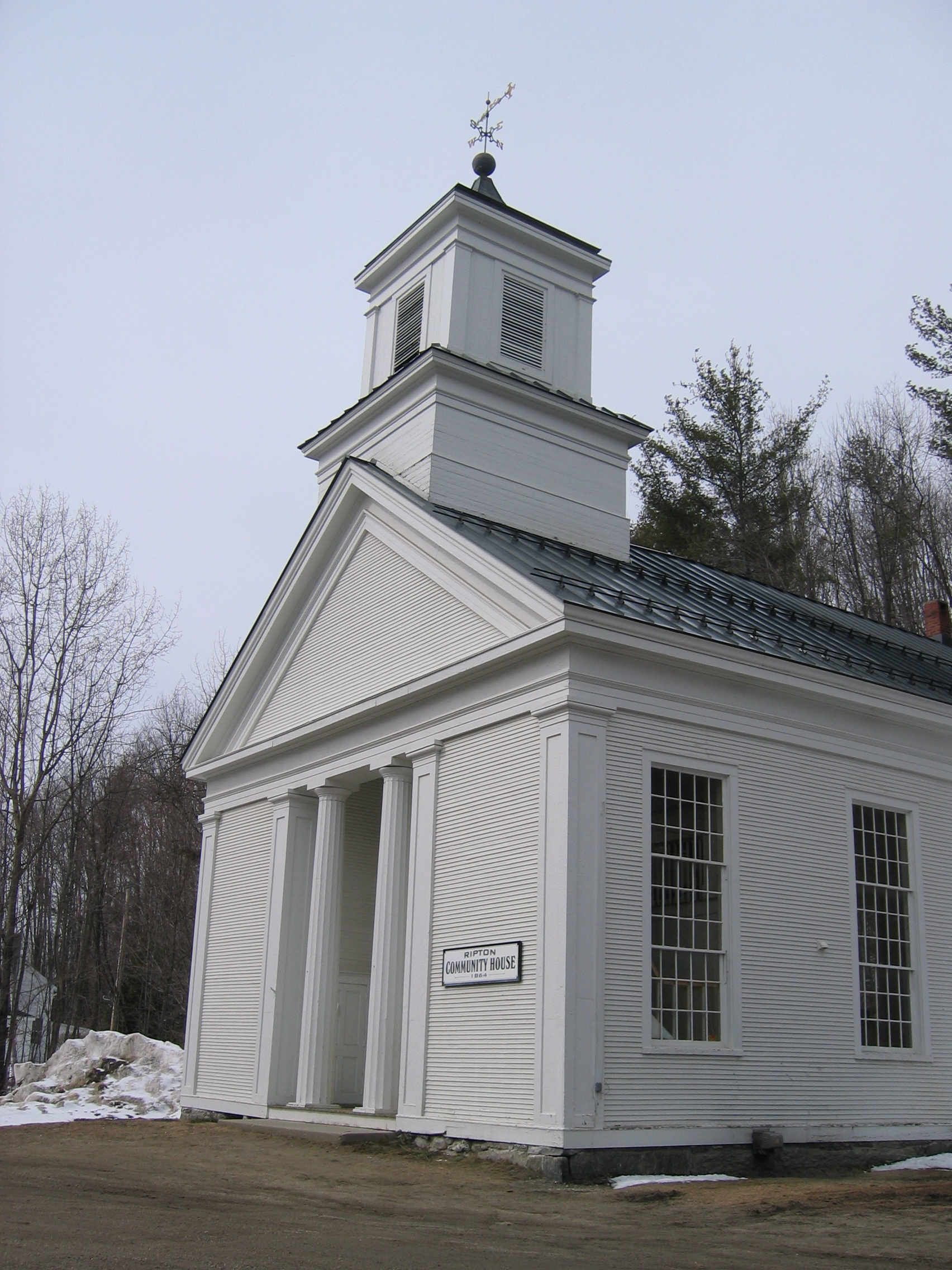
- The Ripton Community House

- Location in Addison County and the state of Vermont
- Coordinates: 43°58′55″N 72°59′28″W
- Country: United States
- State: Vermont
- County: Addison
- Chartered: 1781
- Communities: Ripton; Bread Loaf

Area
  - Total: 49.8 sq mi (129.1 km^{2})
  - Land: 49.7 sq mi (128.7 km^{2})
  - Water: 0.15 sq mi (0.4 km^{2})
- Elevation: 1,683 ft (513 m)

Population (2020)
  - Total: 739
  - Density: 15/sq mi (5.7/km^{2})
- Time zone: UTC-5 (Eastern (EST))
  - Summer (DST): UTC-4 (EDT)
- ZIP code: 05766
- Area code: 802
- FIPS code: 50-59650
- GNIS feature ID: 1462187
- Website: www.riptonvermont.org

Ripton is a town in Addison County, Vermont, United States. The population was 739 at the 2020 census.

== Geography ==
Ripton is located in east-central Addison County, in the Green Mountains of Vermont. The highest point in the town is the 3,835-foot (1,169 m) summit of Bread Loaf Mountain. The mountain lends its name to the community of Bread Loaf and to the writers' conference that is held there every summer. Although the approach to Middlebury Gap begins in Ripton, the Gap's height-of-land is in neighboring Hancock.

Ripton is bordered by the town of Middlebury to the west, Bristol and Lincoln to the north, Granville to the east, Hancock to the southeast, Goshen to the south, and Salisbury to the southwest.

According to the United States Census Bureau, Ripton has a total area of 49.8 square miles (129.1 km^{2}), of which 49.7 square miles (128.7 km^{2}) is land and 0.15 square miles (0.4 km^{2}), or 0.34%, is water. Ripton is mountainous and largely populated by northern hardwood forest.

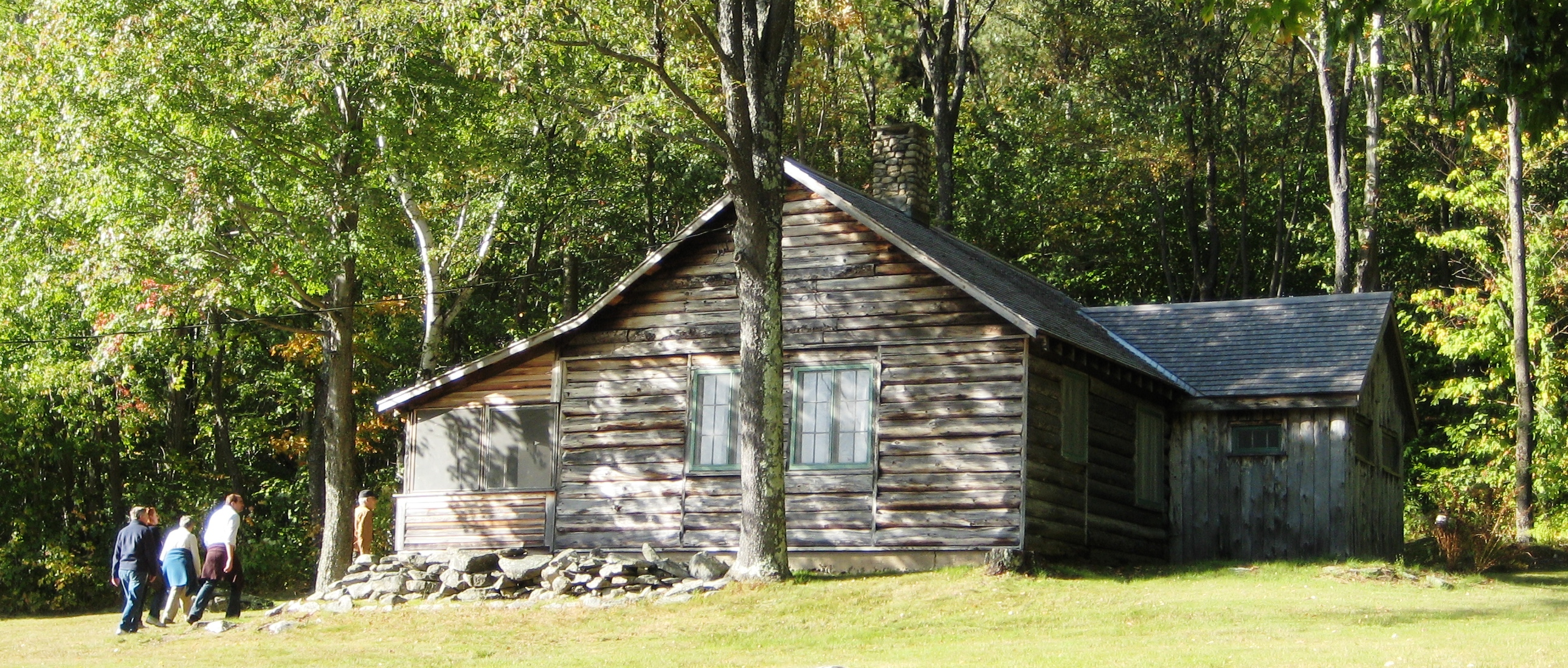
The Robert Frost Cabin

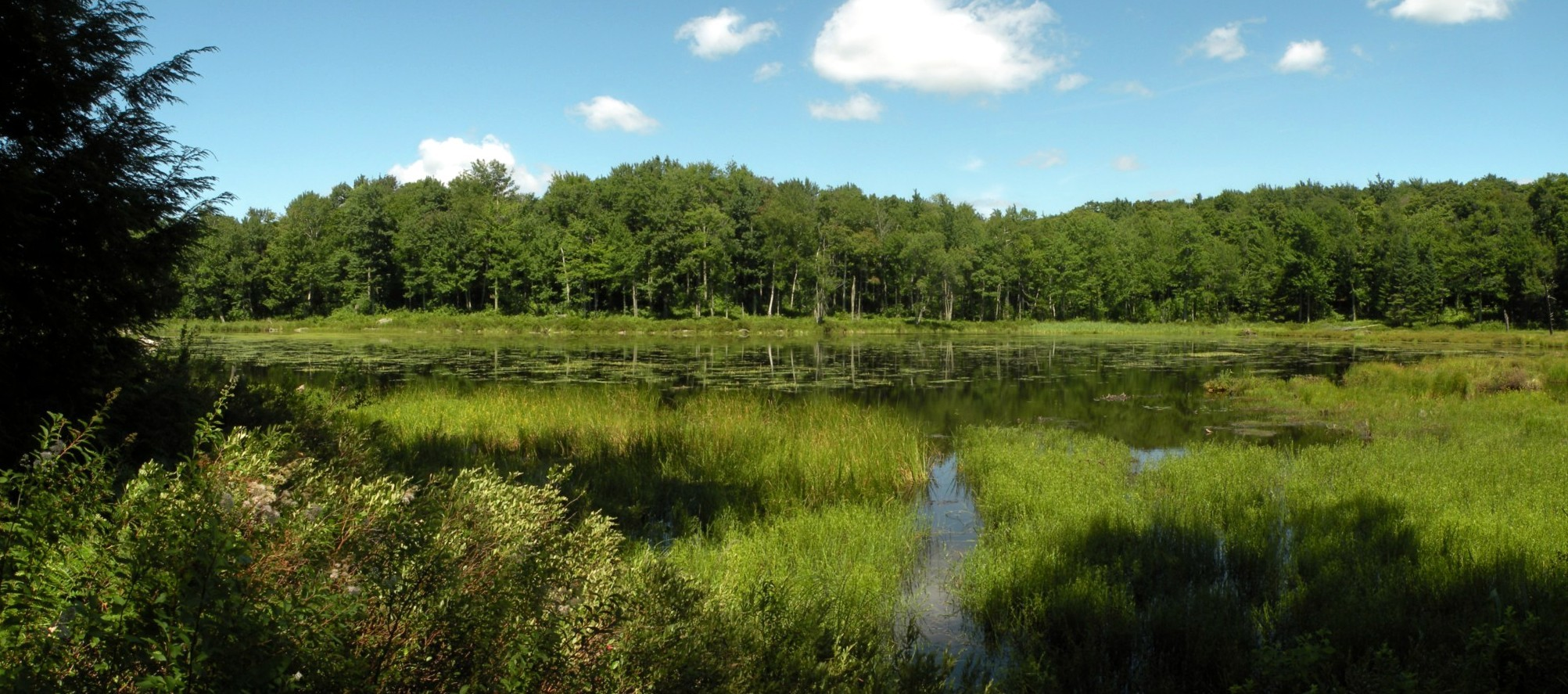
Abbey Pond

== Demographics ==
Historical population
Census	Pop.	Note	%±
1810	15		—
1820	42		180.0%
1830	278		561.9%
1840	357		28.4%
1850	567		58.8%
1860	570		0.5%
1870	617		8.2%
1880	672		8.9%
1890	568		−15.5%
1900	525		−7.6%
1910	421		−19.8%
1920	237		−43.7%
1930	194		−18.1%
1940	231		19.1%
1950	207		−10.4%
1960	131		−36.7%
1970	187		42.7%
1980	327		74.9%
1990	444		35.8%
2000	556		25.2%
2010	588		5.8%
2020	739		25.7%
U.S. Decennial Census

At the 2000 census, there were 556 people, 210 households and 152 families residing in the town. The population density was 11.2 per square mile (4.3/km^{2}). There were 283 housing units at an average density of 5.7 per square mile (2.2/km^{2}). The racial makeup of the town was 97.66% White, 0.18% African American, 0.18% Native American, 0.36% Asian, 0.18% from other races, and 1.44% from two or more races. Hispanic or Latino of any race were 0.54% of the population.

There were 210 households, of which 38.1% had children under the age of 18 living with them, 56.2% were married couples living together, 11.4% had a female householder with no husband present, and 27.6% were non-families. Of all households 22.4% were made up of individuals, and 5.7% had someone living alone who was 65 years of age or older. The average household size was 2.54 and the average family size was 2.89.

Age distribution was 26.1% under the age of 18, 6.3% from 18 to 24, 30.4% from 25 to 44, 29.0% from 45 to 64, and 8.3% who were 65 years of age or older. The median age was 38 years. For every 100 females, there were 113.0 males. For every 100 females age 18 and over, there were 106.5 males.

The median household income was $39,583, and the median family income was $47,813. Males had a median income of $36,250 versus $30,893 for females. The per capita income for the town was $19,597. About 10.3% of families and 15.6% of the population were below the poverty line, including 25.2% of those under age 18 and 7.4% of those age 65 or over.

== Education ==
It is in the Addison Central Unified School District.

Formerly there was Ripton Elementary School. In 2026, the people voted to end operations of the school.

== Events ==
The Bread Loaf Writers' Conference is held annually in Ripton. Jessica Ravitz of CNN said that the town "is the kind of place where cell service fails more often than it works and the country store is really just that....Tibetan prayer flags wave outside a weather-worn home, and the fog lifts to reveal a white horse grazing in a field".

== Notable people ==
- Robert Durst, multi-millionaire and convicted murderer lived in Ripton in 1971–1972
- Robert Frost, poet
- Bill McKibben, environmentalist and climate change author
