= Nora Jacobson =

American filmmaker

Nora Jacobson is an American filmmaker.

== Early life and education ==
Jacobson was born in Norwich, Vermont. She spent eight years of her childhood in Paris. She studied experimental filmmaking at Antioch College and studied with Paul Sharits. She transferred to Dartmouth College, where she graduated with a BA in Anthropology and French literature. She received an MFA from the school of the Chicago Art Institute where she studied with Stan Brakhage, Bruce Baillie and others. Later she moved to Hoboken, New Jersey where she lived for 15 years, documenting the gentrification that was taking place. She moved back to Vermont in 1995.

== Career ==
Jacobson pursued a filmmaking career while in New York City and taught filmmaking at The New School for Social Research, Ramapo College of New Jersey and the State University of New York at Purchase. When she moved back to Vermont she began making narrative films as well as continued to make documentaries. She taught at Burlington College and Dartmouth College. She helped found White River Indie Film Festival and Freedom & Unity TV, a film contest for young filmmakers.

== Awards and honors ==
Her film Delivered Vacant premiered at the 1992 New York Film Festival, Sundance and won a Golden Gate award at the San Francisco Film Festival. In 2016, Jacobson received the Herb Lockwood Prize, an annual award of Burlington City Arts. In 2023, she received the Middlebury New Filmmakers Award for Excellence in Filmmaking.

== Filmography ==
- Ruth Stone's Vast Library of the Female Mind (2021)
- Passion in a Pandemic: Making Opera at Hanover High School
- The R Word a.k.a. Raghead (Short) 2018
- The Hanji Box 2016
- A Very New Idea 2013
- Freedom & Unity: The Vermont Movie 2013
- Nothing Like Dreaming 2004
- My Mother's Early Lovers 1998
- Delivered Vacant 1992
