= List of English-language metaphors =

A list of metaphors in the English language organised alphabetically by type. A metaphor is a literary figure of speech that uses an image, story or tangible thing to represent a less tangible thing or some intangible quality or idea; e.g., "Her eyes were glistening jewels". Metaphor may also be used for any rhetorical figures of speech that achieve their effects via association, comparison or resemblance. In this broader sense, antithesis, hyperbole, metonymy and simile would all be considered types of metaphor. Aristotle used both this sense and the regular, current sense above. With metaphor, unlike analogy, specific interpretations are not given explicitly.

== Animals ==
- 800-pound gorilla
- Albatross (metaphor)
- Song bird (metaphor)
- Belling the cat
- Blind men and an elephant
- Boiling frog
- Butterfly effect
- Camel's nose
- Canary in the coal mine
- Chicken or the egg
- Dead cat bounce
- Duck trick
- Elephant in the room
- Beating a dead horse
- Four Asian Tigers
- His Eye is on the Sparrow
- Letting the cat out of the bag
- Mama grizzly
- Monkey see, monkey do
- Ostrich effect
- Reverse ferret
- Seeing pink elephants
- The Sheep and the Goats
- Snake venom
- Spherical cow
- Throw to the wolves
- Turkeys voting for Christmas
- Turtles all the way down
- White elephant
- Who breaks a butterfly upon a wheel?
- You have two cows
- Shaving a cat with no hair

== Body parts ==
- Broken heart
- Cold feet
- Heart (symbol)

== Nautical ==
- A different tack
- A wide berth
- Adrift
- All hands to the pumps
- Awash
- Back and fill
- Batten down the hatches - meaning to secure the hatch covers against ingress of water in preparation for a storm or other rough conditions.
- By and large - from a term for sailing a ship slightly off of the wind.
- Clear the decks - meaning to get everything out of the way as a warship went into action.
- Flagship
- Flying the flag
- In the doldrums
- Keel over
- Learn/show someone the ropes - Show someone the ropes to show or explain to someone how to do a task or operation. Taken from the use of ropes to orient and adjust the sails, and that each rope is belayed at a specific place.
- Left high and dry
- Leeway - meaning the flexibility, freedom or extra time and space to take action, taken from the nautical use of lee (the side of the boat against the wind) and forward motion.
- Loaded to the gunwales
- Loose cannon - meaning a dangerously out of control person or thing.
- Nail one's colors to the mast - to commit completely to a course of action, as striking the colors is no longer an option
- On one's beam ends
- Pipe down - meaning to stop talking or making noise, originally from the Royal Navy where an officer would blow a whistle called a pipe to signal sailors to go to their bunks.
- Plain sailing
- Sail close to the wind - to operate hazardously on very slim margins, usually applied in a financial sense. Derived from the practice of sailing close to the direction of the oncoming wind, where a small shift in the wrong direction could set the vessel aback.
- Swinging the lead - to avoid duty by feigning illness or injury, original a confusion between Swing the leg which related to the way dogs can run on three legs to gain sympathy and the sailor's term heaving the lead which was to take soundings.
- Sun over the yardarm: This phrase is widely used, both afloat and ashore, to indicate that the time of day has been reached at which it is acceptable to have lunch or (more commonly) to have an alcoholic beverage.
- "Take soundings" - In suspected shallow waters, a crew member may have the task of repeatedly throwing into the water a lead line, or piece of lead tied to a string knotted every fathom, for the purpose of estimating the depth of the sea. This saying the nautical equivalent of "Take the lay of the land": see how things are going, or see what people think about a proposed course of action.
- Taken aback - on a sailing vessel the sails were 'taken aback' when the wind was unintentionally blowing on the wrong side of the sails causing a potentially dangerous situation. Later used to indicate a difficult or unexpected situation.
- Tide over - meaning to help someone survive until a rough time is over.
- Three sheets to the wind - meaning "staggering drunk," refers to a ship whose sheets have come loose, causing the sails to flap uncontrolled and the ship to meander at the mercy of the elements. Also, "Three sheets in the wind, unsteady from drink."
- To the bitter end - may have originally referred to a rope fastened to the bitt, a post attached on the deck of a ship, although this etymology has been disputed.
- Unmoored
- Weathering a storm
- With flying colors - the colors was the national flag flown at sea during battle, a ship would surrender by lowering the colors and the term is now used to indicate a triumphant victory or win.

== Objects ==
- Big red button
- Brass ring
- Brass monkey
- Bucket brigade
- Chain reaction
- Chinese fire drill
- Cultural mosaic
- Domino effect
- Don't judge a book by its cover
- Holy Grail
- Inverted pyramid
- Law of the instrument
- Melting pot
- Rosetta Stone
- Silver bullet
- Snowball effect
- Soapbox
- Zanata Stone

== People ==
- Aunt Sally
- Cassandra (metaphor)
- Copernican Revolution (metaphor)
- Hobson's choice
- Judgment of Solomon
- Mary Sue
- Procrustes
- Whipping boy
- Aunt Flow
- Uncle Sam

== Places ==
- Crossing the Rubicon
- wikt:crossroads, a decision point; a turning point or opportunity to change direction, course, or goal.
- Fork in the road (metaphor)
- wikt:grey area, an area or topic that is not one thing or the other, or where the border between two things is fuzzy. See also wikt:fall between two stools
- Ground zero
- Mother lode
- Plateau effect
- Podunk
- Point of no return
- Slippery slope
- Walk to Canossa

== Science ==
Richard Honeck described three forms of scientific metaphors: "mixed scientific metaphor, the scientific metaphor theme, and the scientific metaphor that redefines a concept from a theory."

- 1959 Valency (linguistics), by Lucien Tesnière, from Valence (chemistry) (1789, by William Higgins)
- 1973 Inductor, by Deleuze and Guattari, from Electromagnetic induction (1831, by Michael Faraday)
- 1980 Rhizome (philosophy), by Deleuze and Guattari, from botanical rhizome

== Sport ==
- Baseball metaphors for sex
- Carnoustie effect
- Doing a Leeds
- Face-off
- False start
- Jump the Gun
- Media scrum
- Own goal
- Pole position
- Political football
- Par for the course

== Various ==
- Aesopian language
- Apollo archetype
- Bad apples
- Battle of egos
- Betamax
- Bīja
- Black-and-white dualism
- Bootstrapping
- Cabin fever
- Cherry picking (fallacy)
- China Syndrome
- City on a Hill
- Closeted
- Coming out
- Drunkard's search
- Enchanted loom
- Endianness
- Fatted calf
- Five wisdoms
- Gates of horn and ivory
- Gold in the mine
- Gordian Knot
- Greek to me
- Green shoots
- Hue and cry
- Indra's net
- Iron (metaphor)
- Jungle
- Kōan
- Late bloomer
- List of scientific metaphors
- McNamara fallacy
- Mindstream
- Moral compass
- Musical chairs
- The Myth of Sisyphus
- Neurathian bootstrap
- Nutshell
- On tenterhooks
- Panopticon gaze
- Pear-shaped
- Post turtle
- The price of milk
- Ignoratio elenchi
- Invincible ignorance fallacy
- Red pill and blue pill
- Roof of the World
- Salad days
- Salt and light
- Ship of state
- Son of a gun
- Survival of the fittest
- Teaching grandmother to suck eggs
- Technical debt
- Touchstone (metaphor)
- Tragedy of the commons
- Tunnel vision
- Unmarked grave
- Yin and yang
- New Testament military metaphors
- New Testament athletic metaphors

== War ==
- Catch-22 (logic)
- Double edged sword
- Fog of war
- Keep one's powder dry
- No-win situation
- Pyrrhic victory
- Saber noise
- Shareholder rights plan
- Shooting the messenger
- Smoking gun
- Texas sharpshooter fallacy
- War chest
- Win-win game

== Lists ==
- List of political metaphors
  - Category:Political metaphors referring to people
- Category:Metaphors by reference
