= Alice Fulton =

American poet

- Born: 1952 (age 73–74); Troy, New York, U.S.
- Occupations: Poet, writer
- Writing career
- Genres: Poetry, fiction, nonfiction
- Notable work: Felt, Sensual Math
- Website: alicefulton.com

Alice Fulton (born 1952) is an American author of poetry, fiction, and nonfiction. Fulton is the Ann S. Bowers Professor of English Emerita at Cornell University. Her awards include the American Academy of Arts and Letters Award in Literature, National Endowment for the Arts Fellowship, Library of Congress Rebekah Johnson Bobbitt National Award, the MacArthur Fellowship, an Ingram Merrill Foundation Award, as well as a Guggenheim Fellowship.

== Biography ==
Fulton was born and raised in Troy, New York, the youngest of three daughters. Her father was the proprietor of the historic Phoenix Hotel, and her mother was a visiting nurse. She began writing poetry in high school. In 1979 she attended a women's poetry conference in Amherst, Mass., which she would later cite as a formative experience. While an undergraduate, she received competitive scholarships to study poetry with Thomas Lux at The Writers Community in New York City. In 1980 she married Hank De Leo and moved to Ithaca, New York, to study poetry under A. R. Ammons, Phyllis Janowitz, Kenneth McClane, and Robert Morgan in Cornell University's Creative Writing Program. While at Cornell, her first book was selected by W. D. Snodgrass for the Associated Writing Program's publication prize. After receiving her MFA, she was a fellow at The Fine Arts Work Center in Provincetown. In 1983 Fulton moved to the University of Michigan in Ann Arbor, Michigan, for a three-year appointment as Fellow in the Michigan Society of Fellows. Mark Strand selected Fulton's second book, Palladium, for publication in the 1985 National Poetry Series. In the interdisciplinary Society of Fellows she further developed her interest in using scientific metaphor and began her lifelong friendship with John H. Holland. She has often cited Holland's writing on Complex Adaptive Systems as being instrumental in the development of her theory on Fractal Poetics [see Fulton's prose collection]. It was also where she met the composers William Bolcom and Enid Sutherland. In 1991 Fulton was awarded a MacArthur "Genius Grant" Fellowship.

In addition to poetry, Fulton has written essays and criticism and has been widely praised for her finely crafted and emotionally powerful short fiction. The Nightingales of Troy collects the ten stories she had published before 2008. Two of those stories were selected for inclusion in The Best American Short Stories. Three contemporary authors share the distinction of appearing in both The Best American Short Stories and The Best American Poetry series: Alice Fulton, Lydia Davis, and Stuart Dybek.

Alice Fulton was a senior fellow in the Michigan Society of Fellows from 1996 to 2000. She remained at University of Michigan until 2002, when she returned to Ithaca as the Ann S. Bowers Distinguished Professor of English at Cornell University. In 2011 she received an American Academy of Arts and Letters Award in Literature. The Library of Congress awarded Fulton the Rebekah Johnson Bobbitt Award in 2002. In 2004 she was the Holloway Lecturer in the Practice of Poetry at University of California, Berkeley, and in 2010 she was the George Elliston Poet at University of Cincinnati. She has also been a visiting professor at University of California, Los Angeles, University of Virginia, Charlottesville, and a number of other universities.

== Works ==
Fulton's poetics "challenges the conventional wisdom among many poets that the content of a poem is less important than its form. In practice, Fulton has created a poetic style that is remarkably "about things" in the sense that her poems explore their overt subject matter deeply and uphold their convictions with rigor. Cascade Experiment ... amply demonstrates not only Fulton's broad range of interests but also her continual and evolving sense of how to use the most seemingly insignificant details to illuminate the nuances of difficult moral ideas."

-- Sarah Cohen

Alice Fulton has suggested that poetry is a "model of the way the world works". Her poetry has been described as "intricately crafted, yet expansive — even majestic — in its scope and vision. One senses there is something startling about to be revealed in these poems, and indeed that mystery or tension often resolves in powerful acts of linguistic reckoning, as if a piece of psychological origami were unfolding before our eyes." The editors of Twentieth-Century American Poetry suggest that "In her drive to freshen poetic diction, avoid cliche and sentimentality, and create 'skewed domains‚' in her poetry, Fulton has distinguished herself as one of the most original American poets writing today. She has succeeded in challenging not only assumptions about gender roles, but also the assumptions underlying current modes of poetry such as the autobiographical, first-person lyric or the experimental 'Language poem.'"

In his introduction to Fulton's first book, Dance Script With Electric Ballerina, W. D. Snodgrass reads Fulton's poetry as a rare example of logopoeia ("the dance of the intellect among words") and writes that "we are always engaged by ... the sense of linguistic virtuosity ... a constant delight ... in language textures, the every-shifting shock and jolt of an electric surface." Newsday, called it an "extremely impressive poetic debut‚" and a Boston Herald reviewer wrote, "Reading her poems is something like listening to a set of the most spirited and peculiar jazz: you must sharpen your spirit to be moved by what is uncanny and rare." While most critical response to this debut volume was positive, conservative critics were "more guarded, or even catty."

Her second collection consolidated the "polyphonic textures," shifts in diction, and signature enjambments that have become hallmarks of her poetry. Palladium is structured in six parts, each focused on the etymology of "palladium" with the trope carried to Ellen Foscue Johnson's palladium photographic print on the cover. One review explained the organizing structure this way: "Etymology breeds metaphor; palladium generates the imagery and energy of the poems, informing them all without necessarily intruding upon them. The organizing principle of an Alice Fulton poem allows for cohesiveness yet is not so narrow or restrictive as to inhibit the flow of associations and ideas. It's as though the world itself were endowed with a centrifugal force, enabling the poet to branch out in numerous directions — parallel lines that manage to intersect on their separate paths to infinity." Sven Birkerts, noting Fulton's "irrepressible inventiveness" and "startling juxtapositions," named this an "aesthetic of profusion." Critics praised these "compressed poems of great texture and inventiveness," as "prepossessing and formidable," "hardwon and solid." Palladium was admired for its "energy and passion for specificity," its "wit and unpredictable, wildly heterogenous combinations," the way "surface and substance, style and content, coexist and are often at odds with one another." Peter Stitt described the style of Palladium as having "so much texture, thanks to [Fulton's] images and to her use of words, and that texture places a palpable surface on the abstract construct of the poem." Many critics praised Fulton's "energy," but Calvin Bedient and others were hostile toward the "wicked intelligence" in Palladium. Fulton defiantly included these criticism in the hand-written marginal comments of her innovative "Point of Purchase" in Powers of Congress. Rita Dove in the Washington Post described it as "a wry sendup of academics, featuring a bona-fide poem littered with marginalia from different critics, each with distinct personalities, literary persuasions and handwriting." Stephen Behrendt commented that this poem "comes with its own set of marginal annotations by (and in) several different hands. Not since Coleridge's "The Rime of the Ancient Mariner" has a long poem presented the reader with so remarkable an example of this particular phenomenon."

Fulton has often referred to Walt Whitman's "I am large, I contain multitudes" as a guiding principle for postmodern verse. David Baker, in reference to the multiplicity of experience evident in Powers Of Congress, wrote that "Fulton is embarked on a project to redefine or recreate poetry according to the multiforms of experience and intellect, rather than to shape experience by modeling it on a received poetic vision." For Larissa Szporluk, Fulton's "truly phenomenal poetics leave me where I've never been, changing the rules of the game of poetry completely." Lawrence Joseph instructs Fulton's reader to "expect a vision of American society — its technological, sexual, class, and religious relationships and context — embodied in language conscientiously intelligent and physical." Commenting on how Fulton's treatment of the "real world is never treated only as an exercise in 'realism'" British poet Rodney Pybus notes the "blessedly unpredictable and unconventional" nature of her use of "psychic and social turmoil." David Barber argues that Fulton's "expansiveness" of subject is realized in "poems that binge not just on language but on lexicons and argots, poems that lift their riffs not only from the deep wells of the American vernacular but from the streamlined vaults of newfangled technology and scientific determinism." Powers of Congress contains many examples of her signature use of polyphony and word superclusters which Fulton has described in interviews and in a 1990 essay on her own poetics, "To Organize A Waterfall."

Sensual Math introduced Fulton's invention of the double-equal or bride sign (see Poetics below). Dorothy Barresi claimed that this work is "what great poetry must do and be" and that "Fulton's poems are like no one else's today‚" with their "on-again, off-again elasticity — a stretching smoothness to some lines, and a snapped back, taut quality to others — that manages to sound both eloquent and scared." Barresi concluded that "Fulton writes with fiery intelligence, and unapologetically so, for it is in the acts of thinking and rethinking that this poet believes we stave off the brute world's numbing assault." Stephen Yenser remarked, "Hers is a maximalist poetry, exploding beyond its boundaries."

Many critics have praised the aural dimension of Fulton's poetry. Writing about Sensual Math, Larissa Szporluk asserted that "Fulton's acoustic signals reign, giving the impression that behind their creation lies some kind of unimaginable technology, telepathic jazz, or just plain genius." Edward Falco corroborated, "Her poems, spoken out loud or 'heard' in the process of reading, offer a subtle, magnificent jazz: a music for the intellect, felt on the tongue and in the body, resonating in the mind. And nowhere is the music of Fulton's poetry more stirring than in Sensual Math." Sensual Math contained a long sequence "reimagining Daphne and Apollo." Donald Riggs writes helpfully about Fulton's translation from the Latin and concludes, "It is within this larger and deeper context that Ovid's tale of Daphne and Apollo takes on, in Fulton's version, an expanded significance: that of the suppression of women's power by the Indo-Aryan patriarchal culture." Building on the music within the poems, the composer Enid Sutherland produced a monumental operatic scoring of this sequence that runs nearly two and one-half hours.

Writing about Felt in The New York Times Book Review, Megan Harlan also commented on how Fulton's poems are "aurally rich with slant rhymes and musical rhythms." The wordplay present in Fulton's earliest poems has by now become thoroughly suffused:

In Alice Fulton's poetry, those charged instances when the literal and the metaphysical (and the sensual and the philosophical) overlap are often mediated by wordplay — a pun, a double entendre, a witty turn of phrase. The title of her marvelous fifth collection, Felt, is meant to signify both an emotion once experienced [and] the fabric constructed by fibers that are forcibly pressed, rather than woven, together.

Carol Muske-Dukes has asserted that Fulton's "poetic intuition is a kind of apperceptive proof — never false," concluding that Felt is "fetishistic, wildly associative, demonically apt and simply eloquent, calling to mind Max Planck's quote about the purpose of science as an 'unresting endeavor' developing toward a vision which 'poetic intuition may apprehend, but which the intellect can never fully grasp.' " Selected from all poetry books published in the United States in 2000 and 2001, Felt was praised by the Rebekah Johnson Bobbitt Award committee as "Full of animated, charged poems." The statement also noted that Felt sizzles with logophilia and tropes, is blessed with the kind of direct wiring between sensation and language, feeling and form, that strikes first with physical and then with intellectual and emotional wallop. Hers is a poetic sensibility at once remarkably comprehensive and remarkably precise, and felt; her best book so far is possessed of great velocity, great staying-power." Felt was also selected by the Los Angeles Times as one of the Best Books of 2001.

As with her poetry collections, Fulton's first fiction collection is carefully constructed from interwoven parts "playing off and enhancing the meaning of one another."

What sets The Nightingales of Troy apart from so many other precocious debut collections is Fulton's knack for the ineffable, for creating stories that are more than the sum of their intricately assembled parts. Her best stories not only exhibit her architectural prowess, they also remind the reader of the near-magical capaciousness of the story form.

Donna Seaman notes that "Fulton displays extraordinary verve in the originality of the predicaments she creates for her irresistible characters, her evocation of the majesty of the land and the rise and decline of the town, and her ravishingly inventive language" and that she draws "brilliantly on the vernacular and ambience of each decade." "Fulton's prose thrives on the tactile, and, as in her poetry, the language is brilliantly precise. While often rooted in the physical, Fulton's narration frequently moves beyond the immediate, both powerfully and subtly."

== Poetics ==
Fulton's "fingerprint-distinct voice" is immediately recognizable for its poetic ambition laced with humor and shifting poetic diction. While sharing an interest in scientific metaphors and diction with her mentor, A.R. Ammons, she differs from Ammons through her engagement with injustice and cruelty. In a statement accompanying her selection of Lisa F. Jackson's film, The Greatest Silence, for the 2008 "Revolution" writers conference and film festival at University of North Dakota, Fulton had this to say about her poetics:

As a poet and writer, I'm committed to undermining postures of arrogance and entitlement, the context of "impunity" [depicted in The Greatest Silence]. Silence — especially enforced silence – has been one of my deep subjects, as has resistance, a quality as important to poetics as to revolutions. I've tried to engage with the background rather than the figure, to find new linguistic ways of confronting disenfranchisement, cruelty, and suffering, while retaining the uncanny qualities of poetry. I've tried to be a student of inconvenient knowledge — the sort of knowledge that, when taken to heart, forces us to change our lives in revolutionary ways.

Sacred, religious, spiritual, compassionate, and ethical themes are incorporated in her work. Miller has noted that "faith" is an "issue that comes up in all of [Fulton's] volumes and in poem after poem," as have Marchant and others. Peter Brier asserts that "Fulton conveys much of the ecstasy that is associated with the strongest religious poets, poets such as Gerard Manley Hopkins" with similarities in phrasing, imagery, and sprung rhythm. Camille Paglia also finds "heavy sprung rhythms ... reminiscent of the poet-priest Gerard Manley Hopkins" and that Fulton's "ecstatic techniques" are deployed "for far earthier and more carnal purposes."

"Like the Language poets, Fulton is interested in linguistic play and artifice, and also in critical theory and philosophy, although the theories most evident in her poetry and essays are those of science and mathematics." "From the first," Fulton "has been as theoretically astute as the Language poets" as well as being interested in a poetry that will "discomfit readers and unsettle their expectations, a poetry of inconvenient knowledge," a phrase originally used in Fulton's 1997 essay.

Fulton first proposed her ideas for a new poetics based on the concepts of fractals and emergent patterns in her 1986 essay, "Of Formal, Free, and Fractal Verse: Singing the Body Eclectic," in which she uses the term "fractal" to suggest "a way to think about the hidden structures of free verse." Tigerlily states that Fulton "coined the phrase 'fractal poetry' as a method of revisioning the value of both formal and free verse, calling the 'poetry of irregular form fractal verse.'" Some critics have taken Fulton to task for an inexact usage of "fractal." Other critics have countered that her use of "fractal" is more metaphorical than literal. Susan Duhig in the Chicago Tribune noted that "For Fulton, the fractal serves as a potent metaphor for a poetry with a form that exists somewhere between utter shapelessness and the Euclidean order of regular meter and genre, a poetry whose volatile, irregular patterning exists on the threshold of structure." Duhig concluded that Fulton's essays explicate "one possible language for understanding poetry in the age of quantum mechanics." Biogeneticist Ana Marti-Subirana writes at length and with specificity on how "Chaos theory and fractal poetics allow Fulton to analyze the complexity of social structures and cultural constructions through new perspectives in poetic form." Fulton's fractal poetics operates "as a means to engage both the poet and the reader of poetry into an intellectual immersion beyond the obvious."

Fulton elaborated on her conceptualization of fractal verse in her 1996 essay, "Fractal Amplifications: Writing in Three Dimensions," in which she posits a "poem plane," a concept analogous to the picture plane in painting. She suggests that "By juxtaposing transparent with textured passages, fractal poetry constructs a linguistic screen that alternately dissolves and clouds." This later fractal essay shows evidence of her conversations with Holland on the subject of complexity. Fulton has stated that John H. Holland's work in complexity theory "greatly affected my poetics in the nineties." A full description of Fractal Verse is beyond the scope of this article; both of the seminal essays are reprinted in Fulton's prose collection. A third essay titled "Fractal Poetics: Adaptation and Complexity" was published in 2005 in Interdisciplinary Science Reviews (UK) with this summary:

In the 1980s, American poets argued over the validity of free verse. One vocal faction claimed that vers libre was formless and lacking in the devices of poetry. In this context I elaborated a poetics I called 'fractal poetry'. Over the last twenty years this poetics has evolved through engagement with complexity studies that provide ways of understanding irregular, chaotic or turbulent systems. The writings of John H. Holland offer examples of open, exploratory and inclusive complex adaptive systems that lack a centre, hierarchy or equilibrium. These dynamic examples may be analogous to a sublime poetry with an ongoing plurality of optimum states located among a multiplicity of textures and gestures. This departure from the traditional 'transcendent lyric ultimate' suggests a maximalist approach giving equal weight to figure and ground, form and content. Physicist Karen Barad's conceptualisation of 'agential realism' provides added dimension to fractal poetics by offering a model for locating meaning in the space between traditional dualisms.

Barbara Fischer's analysis of Fulton's ekphrastic poem "Close" in Felt explains this maximalist approach:

Fulton's mixture of media is edgy and experimental — "This is not an illustration." She stands close enough to her subjects to see that art, visual or verbal, is adulterated by evidence of the processes that have made it. The museum-goer notes that "In person, [the painting] looked a little dirty. / I could see the artist's hairs / in the pigment—traces of her / head or dog or brush." She sees "gooey gobs of / process painted in," and notes Mitchell's knifework, which has "left some gesso showing through, / a home for lessness that— / ... / is a form of excess." This paradoxical excess of absence describes a characteristic feature in Fulton's work, here and in earlier books — a lavish and roiling expenditure of imagery and wordplay that draws attention to the means by which any representational illusion of plenitude is sustained. Critics have emphasized the "excesses" of Fulton's vivacious artifice, digressiveness, and heterogeneous diction (I would agree with those who do not consider such "excess" pejorative), and Felt ... powerfully investigates the emotional stakes of this "form of excess" as a poetics.

Reviewing Powers Of Congress in 1991, Eavan Boland was the first to liken Fulton to Emily Dickinson. With the 1995 publication of Sensual Math, Publishers Weekly suggested "[Fulton] may be Dickinson's postmodern heir." Critic and Dickinson scholar Cristanne Miller further expounded on similarities between Dickinson and Fulton: "Like Dickinson, Fulton crosses the boundaries of popular and highly experimental genres of poetry writing ... Even in long poems and sequences of poems, Fulton's verse has the tight constructedness and multiple layered qualities of Dickinson's poetry ... Fulton shares Dickinson's outrageous sense of play with both cultural icons and aspects of English normally taken for granted." Miller also has pointed to Fulton's kinship with Dickinson in the use of end-of-line syntactic doubling, and was the first critic to note similarities in punctuation.

Where Dickinson makes the dash key to the rhythms and expression of her poetry, Fulton introduces a new sign of punctuation that she calls 'a bride / after the recessive threads in lace' [= =]. This double-equal sign, which 'might mean immersion,' is 'the unconsidered // mortar' between bricks; it makes 'visible the acoustic signals / of things about to flame,' 'hinging one phrase to the next,' throwing the reader into the same kind of adventurous uncertainty as Dickinson's dash.

Miller goes on to say, "For both poets, this interest in hinges, in connections, in incongruities and contiguities reveals itself in verbal and syntactical structures as well as in themes. In short, while these are poets of big ideas, they also are very much poets of language ... Like Dickinson, Fulton makes us see the pomposity, ridiculousness, and fragility of our beliefs, hopes, and attitudes as well as the sometimes terrible wonder of human interaction and the universe beyond ourselves." In addition to Dickinson's influence, Mark Jarman and Cristanne Miller have noted the influence of Marianne Moore. Rita Dove has written that "Nabokov is one of Alice Fulton's literary mentors: The sheer delight in language's subterfuges, the knotty avenues of recollections and desire, the human need for 'significance' that forms narratives even where there are none — these themes are the very bone and gristle of Fulton's prodigal, energetic poetry."

=== Quotes ===
- "Anguish is the universal language."
- "The truly new looks truly wrong at first."
- "Emotion is the best mnemonic device."
- "A perfect skepticism questions disbelief."
- "Poetry is neither future driven nor teleological in spirit. The pleasure exists in the presence and texture of each line, as each line is experienced. Which is to say: fiction is about what happens next; poetry is about what happens now."
- "The unseemly has been the enemy of women's progress."
- "Simplicity is prized as a symptom of sincerity."
- "I used the hand's most important attribute, opposition, to hold the pen."
- "The wish to survive turns poets into poeticians, mincing their words."
- "Nothing is lonlier than what's human."
- "... as free verse broke the pentameter, fractal verse can break the poem plane or linguistic surface."

Many critics have commented on Fulton's command of scientific metaphor. Marti-Subirana asserted that "Alice Fulton's poetry stands as one of the most representative examples of intellectual exchange between contemporary experimental poetics and modern science — as represented by quantum physics, chaos theory and complexity theory." Marti-Subirana has elaborated on Fulton's use of "Complexity theory and Darwinism‚" and has identified a dimension of Fulton's work that she calls "Fulton's poetry of emergence." "This dimension examines individual and collective emotions (such as detachment and compassion), and behavioral patterns (such as cruelty) from the perspective of emergence and emergent patterns." "Emergence‚" is a central tenet of John H. Holland's description of Complex Adaptive Systems.

Harvard mathematician Barry Mazur has written about Fulton's poetics and its relation to the "science of connections bridging differences." Mazur claims that Fulton engages with mathematics as the "science of the subtle glues ... that bind different ideas together, and yet keep them distinguished." He noted that "The very connectors themselves come out into the open in the poem entitled '= =.' " Sensual Math contains a number of poems that deploy and define her "bride sign." As with all of Fulton's books, including her fiction and nonfiction prose, Sensual Math is a carefully constructed web of interrelated parts that form an organic whole. One critic predicted that "Sensual Math might well come to be seen as one of the most significant volumes of the 1990s."

Writing about the double-equal sign, Lynn Keller commented,

Her inventive work, which stretches the linguistic, tonal, vocal, and emotional range of contemporary lyric, points ultimately to resources that lie between recognized categories, in liminal states, and at the cultural margins as offering hope for significant social and aesthetic change. Her double equal sign and other rejections of patriarchal binaries aim ... to counter the destructive othering that pervades all aspects of our lives ...

Physicist Karen Barad's book, Meeting the Universe Halfway, takes its title from Alice Fulton's poem "Cascade Experiment," first published in 1989. Gabriel Mckee, comments that the poem "contains this compelling passage:

Because truths we don't suspect have a hard time
making themselves felt, as when thirteen species
of whiptail lizards composed entirely of females
stay undiscovered due to bias
against such things existing,
we have to meet the universe halfway.
Nothing will unfold for us unless we move toward what
looks to us like nothing: faith is a cascade.

"The poem is a wonderful combination of science and faith, and finds mystery in empiricism." Mckee continues, saying that the poem reminds him "of the 14th-century mystical text The Cloud of Unknowing, the title of which offers perhaps the most famous illustration of apophatic theology ... Fulton's poem makes an eloquent and moving case for science that seeks the unknowable, the unbelievable, and the impossible."

Fulton's formal inventions invariably employ "form" in the service of content. She has stated that "During the act of writing, technique and meaning are inextricably linked, and it is only for the convenience of critical discussion that one could wish to separate them. The realization that craft depends on content leads to the concept of organic form and the idea that whatever elements help us experience a poem as a whole can be called its form." In an essay concerned with the body poems of Anne Sexton and Alice Fulton, Deborah Landau asserts that "Fulton's forms often reinforce the discursive claims of her poems." The editors of 20th Century Poetics point to "active enjambments" in Fulton's work "that make words do double duty as different parts of speech." Peter Brier says that Fulton uses enjambment‚ "to sharpen her phrasing, which in turn is remarkably sure and strengthened by the vividness of her imagery." Fulton has stated in interviews that she tries to "think freshly about the why of every line" and how to make "meaning shift at enjambments without the end word in the line changing its part of speech." Another of Fulton's techniques is that "she often refuses to gender her speakers, forcing her readers to reconsider their assumptions about what constitutes male or female identity."

Throughout her career, Fulton has juxtaposed references to popular culture with allusions to literary and high culture. Ernest Smith has argued that a "significant theme in Fulton's work is the relationship among the individual, imagination, and culture, both historically constructed aspects of culture and contemporary, popular culture." Smith also comments on Fulton's "polyphonic texture" as "a sense of multiplying resonance akin to the use of counterpoint in music."

== Awards and honors ==
- American Academy of Arts and Letters Award in Literature
- Library of Congress Rebekah Johnson Bobbitt National Award
- MacArthur Fellowship
- Ingram Merrill Foundation Award
- Guggenheim Fellowship
- National Endowment for the Arts Fellowship
- Michigan Society of Fellows
- Michigan Council for the Arts, Individual Grants in Literature
- The Fine Arts Work Center Fellowship
- Finalist, Los Angeles Times Book Award

== Bibliography ==
=== Poetry ===
==== Collections ====
- Coloratura On A Silence Found In Many Expressive Systems: Poems (2022)
- Barely Composed (2015)
- Cascade Experiment: Selected Poems (2004)
- Felt (2001) winner of the Bobbitt National Prize for Poetry in (2002)
- Sensual Math (1995)
- Powers of Congress (1990)
- Palladium (1986) winner of the National Poetry Series and the Society of Midland Authors Award in 1986
- Dance Script with Electric Ballerina (1983) winner of the Associated Writing Programs Award in (1982)
- Anchors of Light chapbook (1979)

==== List of poems ====
Title	Year	First published	Reprinted/collected
The ice storm	1985	Fulton, Alice (January 7, 1985). "The ice storm". The New Yorker. Vol. 60, no. 47. p. 32.	
Malus Domestica	2012	Fulton, Alice (February 13–20, 2012). "Malus domestica". The New Yorker. Vol. 88, no. 1. pp. 82–83.	
The next big thing	2013	Fulton, Alice (March 25, 2013). "The next big thing". The New Yorker. Vol. 89, no. 6. pp. 66–67.	

=== Fiction ===
- Fulton, Alice (2008). The nightingales of Troy : stories of one family's century. New York: W. W. Norton. ISBN 9780393048872.

=== Non-fiction ===
- Feeling as a Foreign Language: The Good Strangeness of Poetry (1999)

== Writings about Alice Fulton's work ==
- Greg Schutz, "The Nightingales of Troy by Alice Fulton," Fiction Writers Review, May 2009.
- Ana Marti-Subirana, "Chaos and Emergence: Dialogic Models of Intellectual Exchange in Alice Fulton's Poetics," paper presented at the Conference on Women's Poetry Since 1900, Duquesne University, Pittsburgh, Pa., September 11–13, 2008, full text by Thoughtmesh.
- Elisabeth Frost and Cynthia Hogue, "Alice Fulton," Innovative Women Poets. Iowa City: University of Iowa Press, 2007, pp. 121–151.
- Barbara K. Fischer, Museum Meditations: Refraiming Ekphrasis in Contemporary American Poetry. New York: Routledge, 2006.
- Ernest Smith, "Alice Fulton," in Contemporary American Women Poets: An A to Z Guide. Westport: Greenwood Press, 2006, pp. 128–132. Contemporary American Women Poets: An A to Z Guide.
- Ernest J. Smith, "Alice Fulton," in The Greenwood Encyclopedia of American Poets and Poetry. Westport: Greenwood Press, 2006, pp. 574–575.
- Sergei Lobanov-Rostovsky, "Alice Fulton," in Dictionary of Literary Biography 193: American Poets Since WW II. Columbia, SC: Bruccoli Clark Layman, 2006, pp. 138–147.
- Cynthia Hogue, "Another Postmodernism: Toward an Ethical Poetics," HOW2 1:7, Spring 2002.
- Alice Fulton, "To Organize a Waterfall," in Feeling as a Foreign Language: The Good Strangeness of Poetry. St. Paul: Graywolf Press, 1999, pp. 173–207.
- Megan Harlan, "The Past Tense of Feel," The New York Times Book Review, April 15, 2001, p. 22.
- Barbara Fischer, "Felt," Boston Review, 26:5:54-56, October/November 2001.
- Lynn Keller, "The 'Then Some Inbetween': Alice Fulton's Feminist Experimentalism" American Literature 71:2:311-340, June 1999.
- Deborah Landau, "'Not a Woman, Quite': The Body Poems of Anne Sexton and Alice Fulton," in Giovanna Covi, ed., Critical Studies on the Feminist Subject. Trento, Italy: Dipartimento di Scienze Filologiche e Storiche, 1997, pp. 209–227.
- Cristanne Miller, "'The Erogenous Cusp': or Intersections of Science and Gender in Alice Fulton's Poetry," in Lynn Keller and Cristanne Miller, eds., Feminist Measures: Soundings in Poetry and Theory. Ann Arbor, Michigan: University of Michigan Press, 1994, pp. 317–343.
- Cristanne Miller, "Alice Fulton: 'Wonder Stings Me More than the Bee,'" Emily Dickinson International Society Bulletin, Nov.-Dec. 1996, pp. 10–11.
- Cristanne Miller, "An Interview with Alice Fulton," Contemporary Literature 38:4:585-615, winter 1997.
