= Partanen =

Partanen is a Finnish surname. Notable people with the surname include:

- Aku Partanen (born 1991), Finnish racewalker
- Anu Partanen (born 1975), Finnish journalist
- Heikki Partanen (1942–1990), Finnish film director and screenwriter
- Iivari Partanen (1880–1947), Finnish gymnast
- Jussiville Partanen (born 1991), Finnish ice dancer
- Mika Partanen (born 1992), Finnish ice hockey player
- Olli Partanen (1922–2014), Finnish discus thrower
- Vaino Olavi Partanen (died 1969), Canadian Forces personnel and Cross of Valour recipient
