= Pissing contest =

Competition to see who can urinate the farthest or highest

A pissing contest, pissing duel, or pissing match, is a game in which participants compete to see who can urinate the highest, the farthest, for the longest, or the most accurately. Although the practice is usually associated with adolescent boys, women have been known to play the game, and there are literary depictions of adults competing in it.

As a metaphor it is used figuratively to characterise futile ego-driven battling in a pejorative or facetious manner that is often considered vulgar. Since the 1940s, the term has been used as an idiomatic slang expression for contests that are "futile or purposeless", especially if waged in a "conspicuously aggressive manner". The image of two people urinating on each other has been offered as a source of the phrase.

== Etymology ==
The Oxford English Dictionary (OED) defines a pissing contest as "a competition to see who can urinate the farthest or highest" and (in extended use) as "any contest which is futile or purposeless especially ones pursued in a conspicuously aggressive manner." An early use of the phrase comes from a 1943 hearing before the U.S. House Select Committee to Investigate the Federal Communications Commission, where Gene Dyer, the owner of the radio station WGES, was quoted as saying: "[Y]ou boys have to understand that I have to deal with a combination like that of Hartley-David; it is like having a pissing contest with a skunk." The OED's first citation of pissing match is from a December 1971 Washington Post story.

Urban Dictionary's crowdsourced definition describes the term as being used figuratively "to refer to a meaningless though nonetheless entertaining act in which people try to outdo one another in any way." Comments found there also describe pissing contests as literal competition "in which two or more people, usually (but not exclusively) male, urinate with the intention of producing the stream with the greatest distance." The New Partridge Dictionary of Slang and Unconventional English separates its definition of "pissing match" (a conflict involving "unpleasantries") from "pissing contest" (a conflict with negative attacks made by both sides). For "pissing contest" it offers a different image from other reference works: "From the graphic if vulgar image of two men urinating on each other". Both phrases are said to originate in the United States.

== Female contests ==
Havelock Ellis, in his book Studies in the Psychology of Sex, describes a female pissing contest in Belgium, in which two women each stood over a bottle with a funnel and urinated into it, the winner being the one who most nearly filled the bottle. Women can, once they have learned the right technique, urinate standing. A comic song from 17th-century Belgium is about a similar contest, aiming into a shoe, between three women seeking to impress a man.

There is also early Irish literature about female pissing contests. In the story "Aided Derbforgaill" several women compete to see who can urinate deepest into a pile of snow. The winner is Derbforgaill, wife of Lugaid Riab nDerg, but the other women attack her out of jealousy and mutilate her by gouging out her eyes and cutting off her nose, ears, and hair, resulting in her death. Her husband Lugaid also dies, from grief, and Cú Chulainn avenges the deaths by demolishing a house with the women inside, killing 150.

== In the animal kingdom ==
Pissing contests are not unique to humans. Trevor Corson's The Secret Life of Lobsters describes a pissing match between lobsters:

The American lobster urinates not from some posterior region of its body, but directly out the front of its face. Two bladders inside the head hold copious amounts of urine, which the lobster squirts through a pair of muscular nozzles beneath its antennae. These powerful streams mix with the gill outflow and are carried some five feet ahead of the lobster in its plume ... What the researchers discovered during the ensuing fights was that dueling lobsters accompanied their most punishing blows during combat by intense squirts of piss at the opponent's face. What was more, in scenes akin to a showdown at the OK Corral, the winner of the physical combat almost always turned out to be the lobster that had urinated first. And well after the fight was over, the winner kept pissing. By contrast, the loser shuts off his urine valves immediately.

== Metaphorical phrase ==
Dwight Eisenhower is reported to have said of Senator Joseph McCarthy that he wouldn't "get into a pissing contest with that skunk." Eisenhower's secretary of state, John Foster Dulles, used the same phrase in 1958 when asked why he had not responded to a statement by the French foreign minister that the French government had not been consulted about the 1958 Lebanon crisis.

The dispute between Carl Icahn and Yahoo! was described as pissing contest. A review of American novelist John Barth's work described it as "resolutely postmodern" in approach and criticised it with a statement that: "Prolonged exposure to this particular 'pissing contest' just left me wanting to tell Barth to parse off". Steven Pinker's The Stuff of Thought: Language as a Window to Human Nature credits the "wordsmiths who thought up the indispensable pissing contest" and other crass phrases such as crock of shit, pussy-whipped, and horse's ass.

The Hippie Dictionary, a fringe counterculture publication, described the arms race between the U.S. and the U.S.S.R. as a pissing contest in which each country developed bigger and more powerful weapons until "each super power could obliterate the other multiple times over as well along with the rest of the world" and that "the term super power did not refer to intelligence".

== See also ==
- Battle of egos
- Competition
