= Mooring bollard =

Short vertical post for mooring of boats

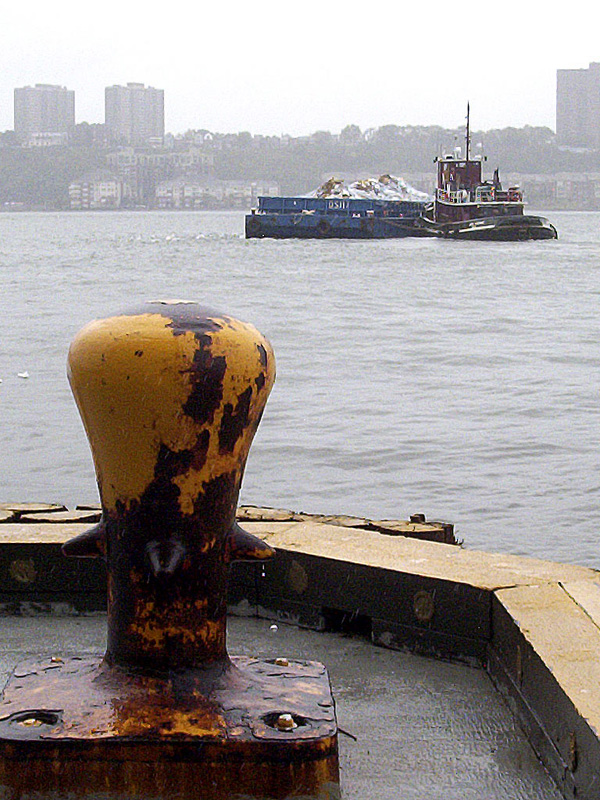
Mooring bollards, such as this one in the Hudson River, were the first type of bollard. The use of the term has since expanded.

Mooring bollards are often installed in a repeating or periodic pattern or lattice, such as this row of bollards at LoveQuay in downtown Toronto.

A mooring bollard is a sturdy, short, vertical post on a ship or quay used principally for mooring boats.

== Etymology ==
The term is probably related to bole, meaning a tree trunk. The earliest citation given by the Oxford English Dictionary (referring to a maritime bollard) dates from 1844, although an account describing bollards as "huge posts" in a shipyard is also known from 1817.

== Maritime use ==
In maritime contexts, a bollard is either a wooden or iron post found as a deck-fitting on a ship or boat, and used to secure ropes for towing, mooring and other purposes; or its counterpart on land, a short wooden, iron, or stone post on a quayside to which craft can be moored. The Sailor's Word-Book of 1867 defines a bollard in a more specific context as "a thick piece of wood on the head of a whale-boat, round which the harpooner gives the line a turn, in order to veer it steadily, and check the animal's velocity". Bollards on ships, when arranged in pairs, may also be referred to as "bitts". Bollards made from old cannon were called niggerheads.

A conventional measure of the pulling or towing power of a watercraft, defined as the force exerted on a shore-mounted bollard through a tow-line by a vessel under full power, is known as bollard pull.

== Gallery ==
Different bollards

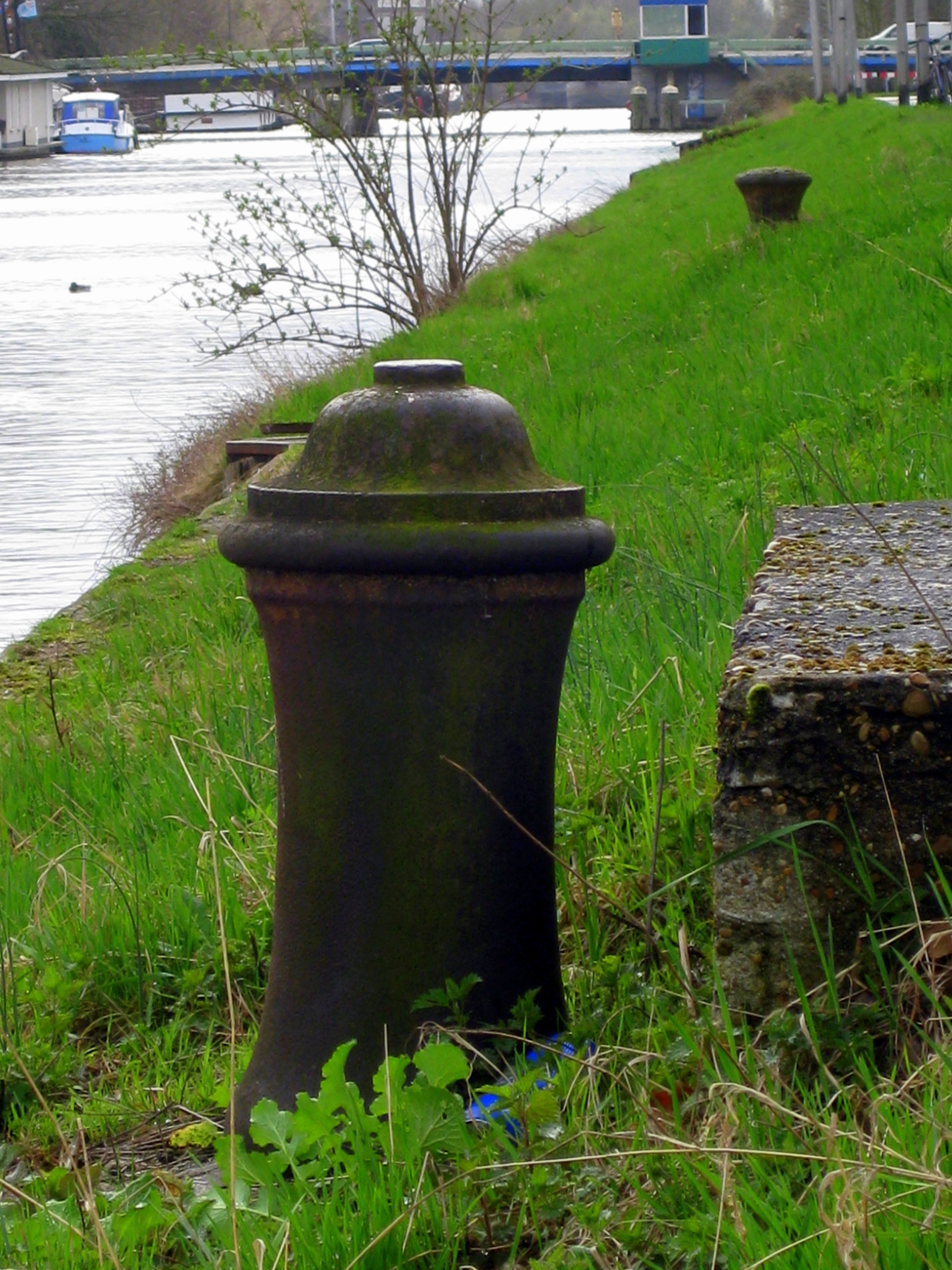
Old cannon used as a mooring bollard on the Merwede-Canal, Utrecht, Netherlands

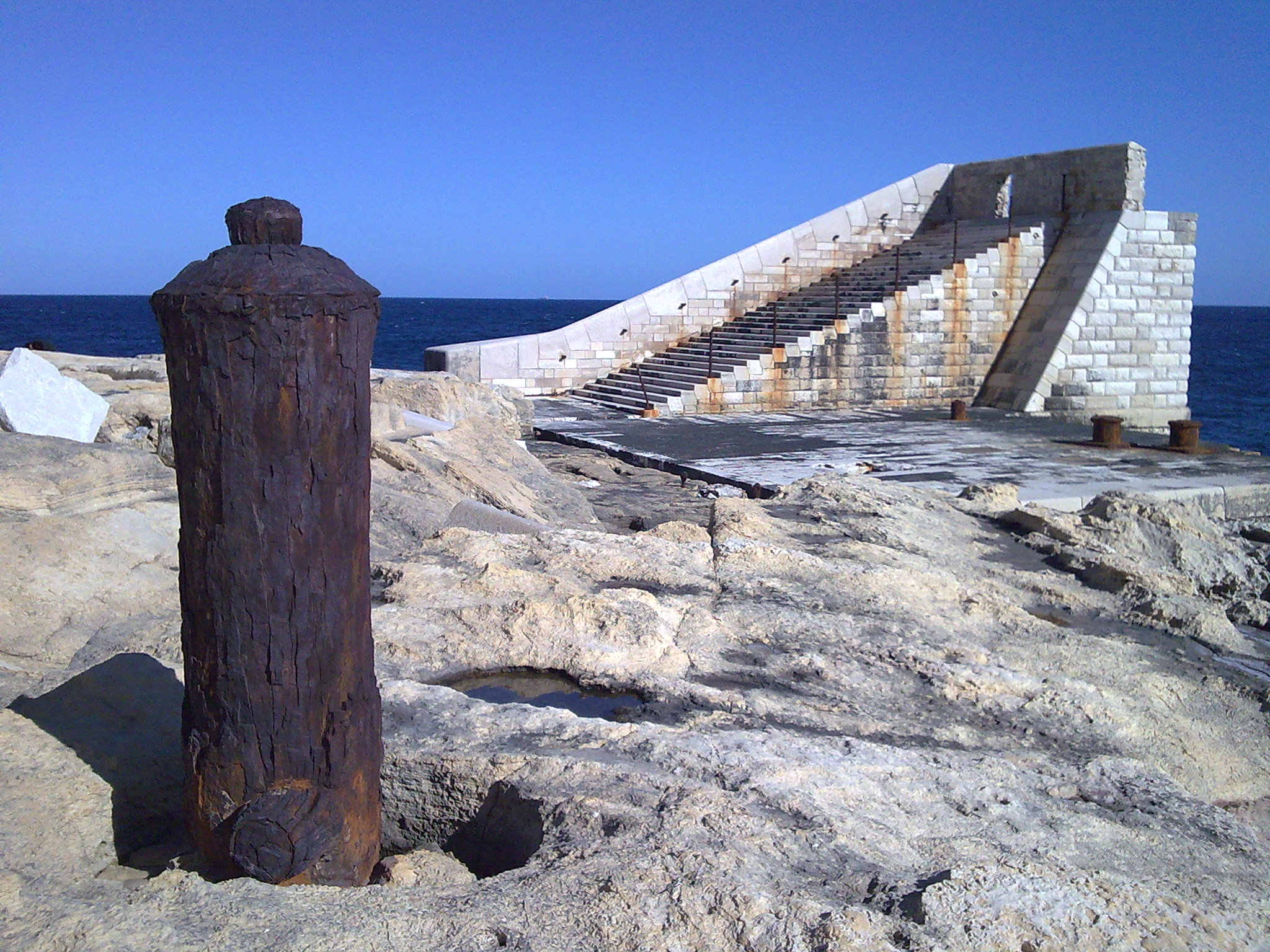
Old cannon used as a mooring bollard, near the entrance of the Grand Harbour, Malta

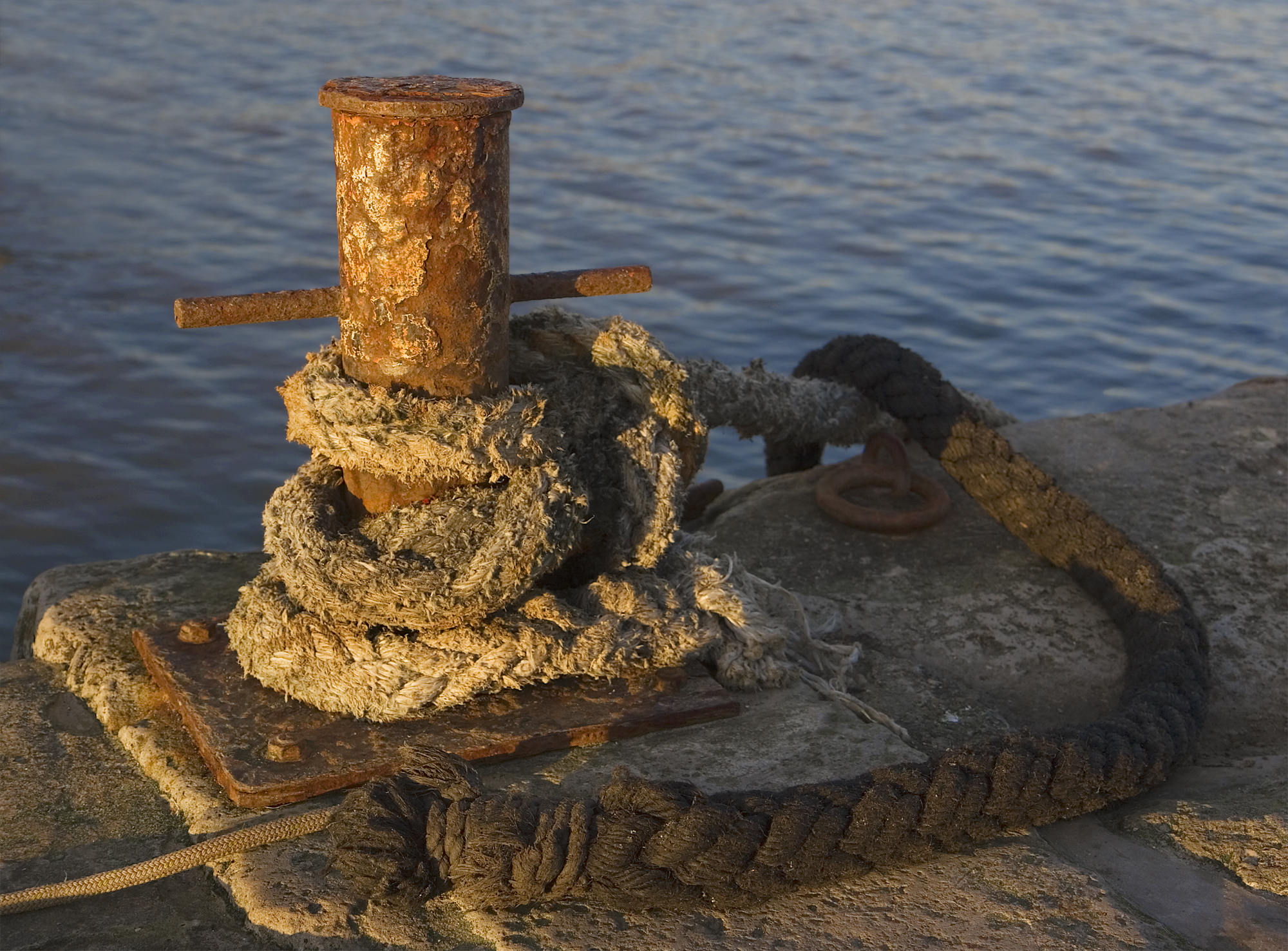
Mooring bollard, Lyme Regis

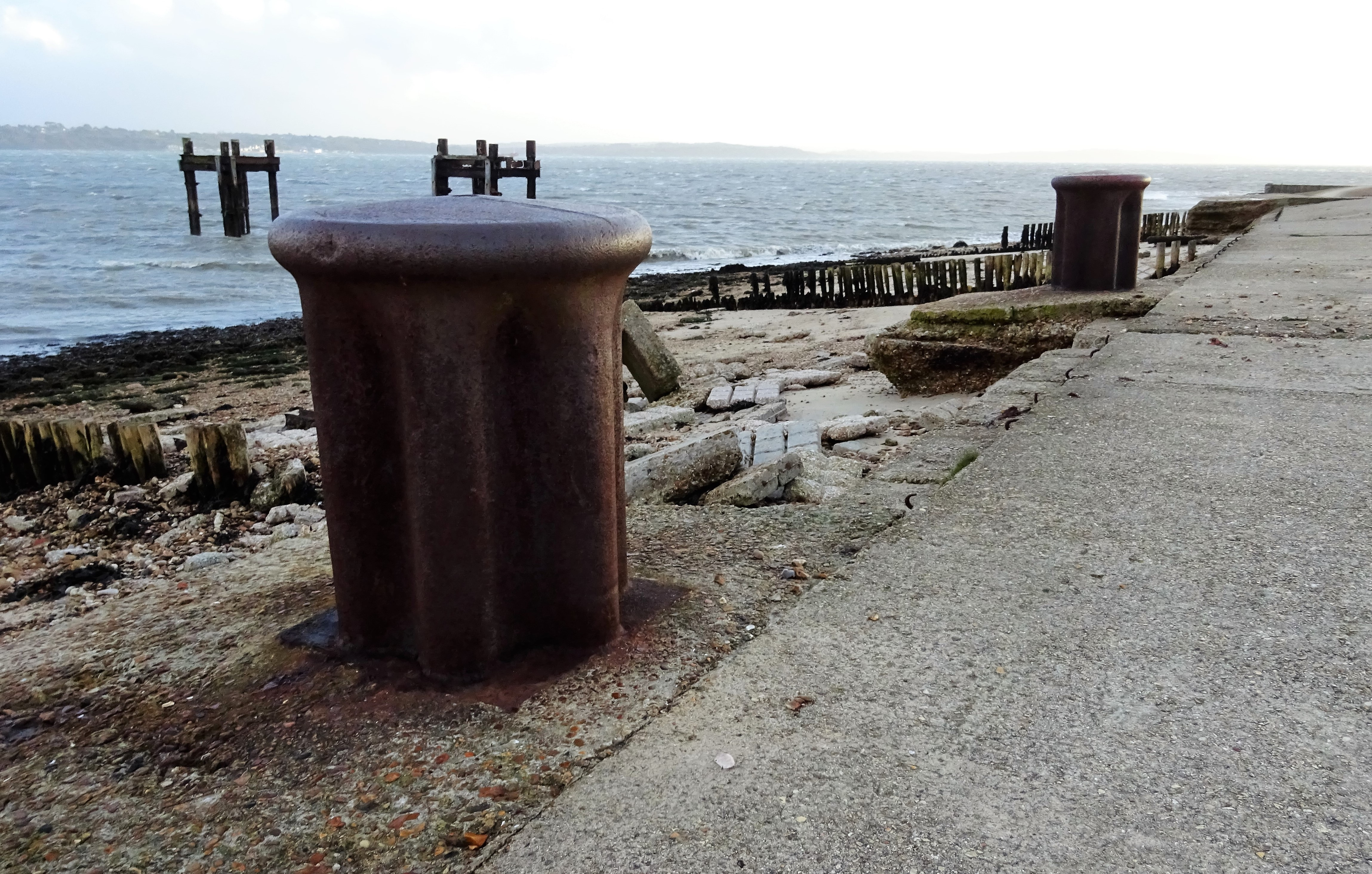
Mooring bollards at Lepe Beach, Hampshire, England, installed in 1944 for the use of craft destined to take part in the D-Day landings

== See also ==
- Anchor
- Berth (moorings)
