= Enchanted loom =

Metaphor for the human brain

The enchanted loom is a famous metaphor for the human brain invented by the pioneering neuroscientist Charles S. Sherrington in a passage from his 1942 book Man on his nature, in which he poetically describes his conception of what happens in the cerebral cortex during arousal from sleep:^{[a]}

The great topmost sheet of the mass, that where hardly a light had twinkled or moved, becomes now a sparkling field of rhythmic flashing points with trains of traveling sparks hurrying hither and thither. The brain is waking and with it the mind is returning. It is as if the Milky Way entered upon some cosmic dance. Swiftly the head mass becomes an enchanted loom where millions of flashing shuttles weave a dissolving pattern, always a meaningful pattern though never an abiding one; a shifting harmony of subpatterns.

The "loom" he refers to was undoubtedly meant to be a Jacquard loom, used for weaving fabric into complex patterns. The Jacquard loom, invented in 1801, was the most complex mechanical device of the early 19th century. It was controlled by a punch card system that was a forerunner of the system used in computers until the 1970s.

According to the neuroscience historian Stanley Finger, Sherrington probably borrowed the loom metaphor from an earlier writer, the psychologist Fredric Myers, who asked his readers to "picture the human brain as a vast manufactory, in which thousands of looms, of complex and differing patterns, are habitually at work". Perhaps in part because of its slightly cryptic nature, the "enchanted loom" has been an attractive metaphor for many writers about the brain, and has supplied the title for several books, including the following:

- Jastrow, Robert (1981). The Enchanted Loom: Mind in the Universe. Simon and Schuster. ISBN 978-0-671-43308-6.. Published 1985 in Spanish by Salvat, with the title "El telar mágico: El cerebro humano y el ordenador" (The magic loom : Human brain and the computer).
- Corsi, Pietro (1991). The Enchanted Loom: Chapters in the History of Neuroscience. Oxford University Press. ISBN 978-0-19-506646-3.
- Cotterill, Rodney (1998). Enchanted Looms: Conscious Networks in Brains and Computers. Cambridge, UK; New York: Cambridge University Press. ISBN 978-0-521-79462-6.

== See also ==
- List of metaphors
- Computational theory of mind – Family of views in the philosophy of mind
- Mechanism (philosophy) – Belief that natural wholes are similar to machines
- Strange loop – Cycles going through a hierarchy

== Notes ==
1. This was Sherrington's understanding in 1942. It is now known that the brain is much more active during sleep than he realized.
