= Bobbitt National Prize for Poetry =

American poetry award

The Rebekah Johnson Bobbitt National Prize for Poetry is awarded biennially by the Library of Congress on behalf of the nation in recognition for the most distinguished book of poetry written by an American and published during the preceding two years. The award is overseen by the Library of Congress Center for the Book.

== The Prize ==
The $10,000 prize winner is chosen by a three-member jury appointed by a selection committee composed of the Librarian of Congress, the Poet Laureate Consultant in Poetry, a publisher named by the Academy of American Poets and a literary critic nominated by the Bobbitt family. Awarded for "the Most Distinguished Book of Poetry Published in 2006 or 2007, OR For Lifetime Achievement in Poetry", nominations come from publishers, and is given only to living American poets. The criteria for the award are that a nomination must be a poet's first poetry book or a book composed of new work of any length. Collected or selected works qualify only if they include at least thirty new poems previously unpublished in book form with prior publication in print media being acceptable.

At the sole discretion of the judging panel, they may instead award the Rebekah Johnson Bobbitt National Prize for Lifetime Achievement in Poetry. There is no formal nomination process for this award and to date it has been given three times.

== History ==
Mrs. Rebekah Johnson Bobbitt was the younger sister of Lyndon B. Johnson, 36th President of the United States. Born in 1910 in Stonewall, Texas, she worked in the cataloging department of the Library of Congress in the 1930s before her brother entered politics. Whilst there, she met college student Oscar Price (O.P) Bobbitt, who also worked in the department. Bobbitt courted Rebekah with love poems typed on index cards and passed secretly to her under the nose of supervisors. After marrying, they returned to Texas and began a family. She died in 1978.

Established in her memory in 1988 by her son, Professor Philip C. Bobbitt, and her husband, the Bobbitt prize was the first national poetry award given in almost 40 years. In 1949, Congress placed a 40-year ban on Library prizes following controversy over the Library's awarding of the 1948 Bollingen National Prize for Poetry to Ezra Pound for his Pisan Cantos. Following the public outcry at the time of the award to Pound, the Joint Congressional Committee on the Library of Congress in 1949 adopted a policy prohibiting the Library henceforth from granting any more awards or prizes.

James H. Billington, the Librarian of Congress, is quoted as stating: "The family relation to the Library is a great love story and it is too good not to want to savor, commemorate and celebrate."

Three-time Poet Laureate, Robert Pinsky, said of the Prize in 2000, "I don't know of any other literary prize that has such a high standard."

== Winners ==
- 1990 – James Merrill for The Inner Room
- 1992 – Louise Glück for Ararat and Mark Strand for The Continuous Life
- 1994 – A. R. Ammons for Garbage
- 1996 – Kenneth Koch for One Train
- 1998 – Frank Bidart for Desire
- 2000 – David Ferry for Of No Country I Know: New and Selected Poems and Translations
- 2002 – Alice Fulton for Felt
- 2004 – B. H. Fairchild for Early Occult Memory Systems of the Lower Midwest
- 2006 – W. S. Merwin for Present Company
- 2008 – Charles Wright for Lifetime Achievement and Bob Hicok for This Clumsy Living
- 2010 – Lucia Perillo for Inseminating the Elephant
- 2012 – Gerald Stern for Early Collected Poems: 1965–1992
- 2014 – Patricia Smith for Shoulda Been Jimi Savannah
- 2016 – Claudia Rankine for Citizen: An American Lyric and Nathaniel Mackey for Lifetime Achievement
- 2018 – Jorie Graham for Fast
- 2020 – Terrance Hayes for American Sonnets for My Past and Future Assassin and Natasha Trethewey for Lifetime Achievement
- 2022 – Heid E. Erdrich for Little Big Bully and Rita Dove for Lifetime Achievement
- 2024 – Arthur Sze for Lifetime Achievement

== See also ==
- American poetry
- List of poetry awards
- List of American literary awards
- List of literary awards
- List of years in poetry
- List of years in literature
