= Price of milk question =

Question asked of politicians

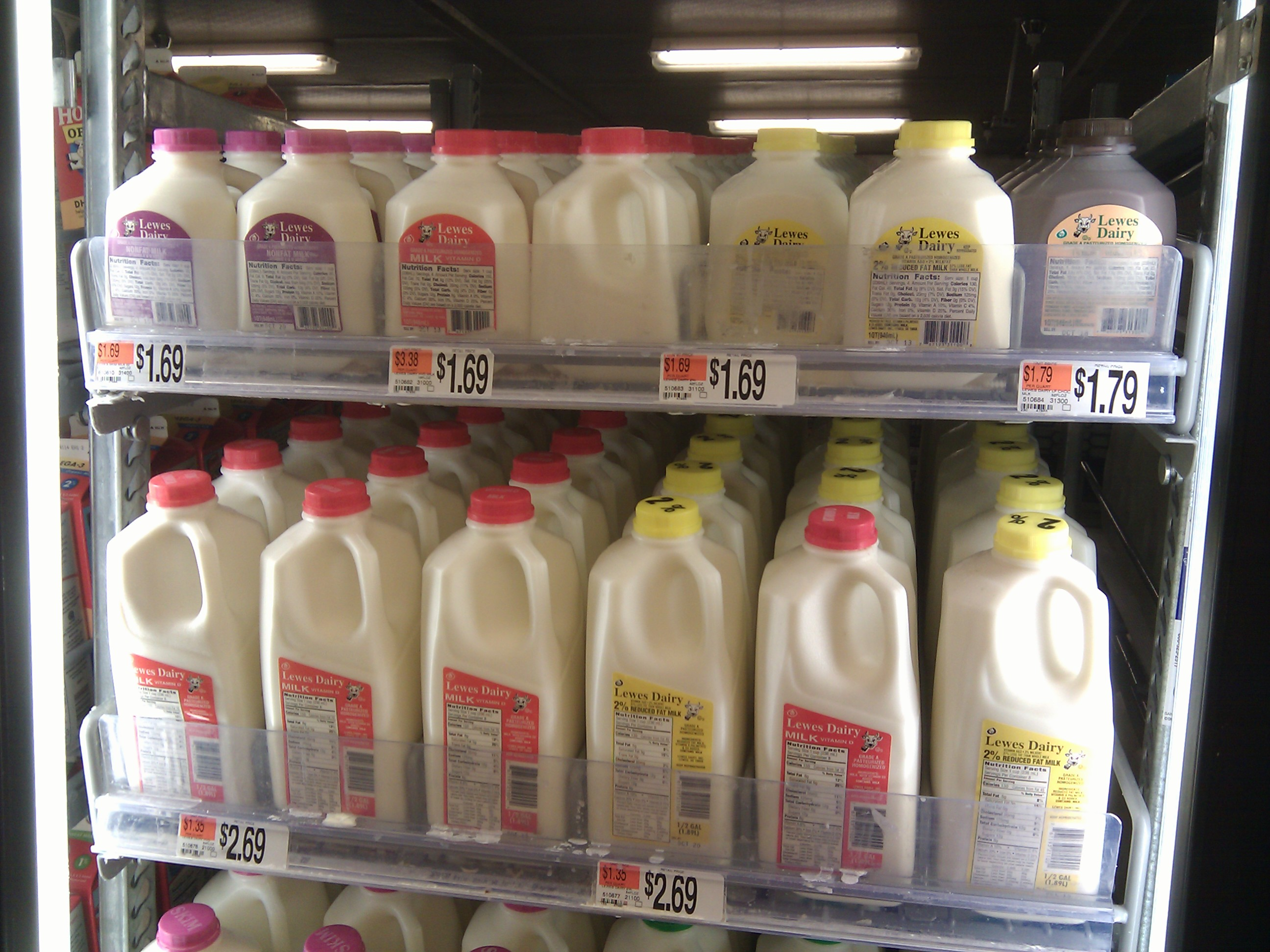
Quarts of milk for sale in a US grocery store

The price of milk question is a tactic for gauging political candidates' familiarity with the lives of ordinary voters in the United States and the United Kingdom is to ask them to name the price of everyday items such as bread and especially milk.

Noted politicians who have admitted ignorance on such questions include George H. W. Bush, David Cameron and Scott Morrison. Former prime minister of Spain, José Luis Rodríguez Zapatero, incorrectly answered on national television when asked the cost for a cup of coffee. Zapatero instead answered with the price at the Congress's cafeteria, which is cheaper than market price. Former Lebanese Prime Minister Saad Hariri incorrectly answered that the price of a bag of bread was 1,000 L.L. after he was asked by a child on TV, when the real price was 1,500 L.L. at the time.
