= Teaching grandmother to suck eggs =

English idiom

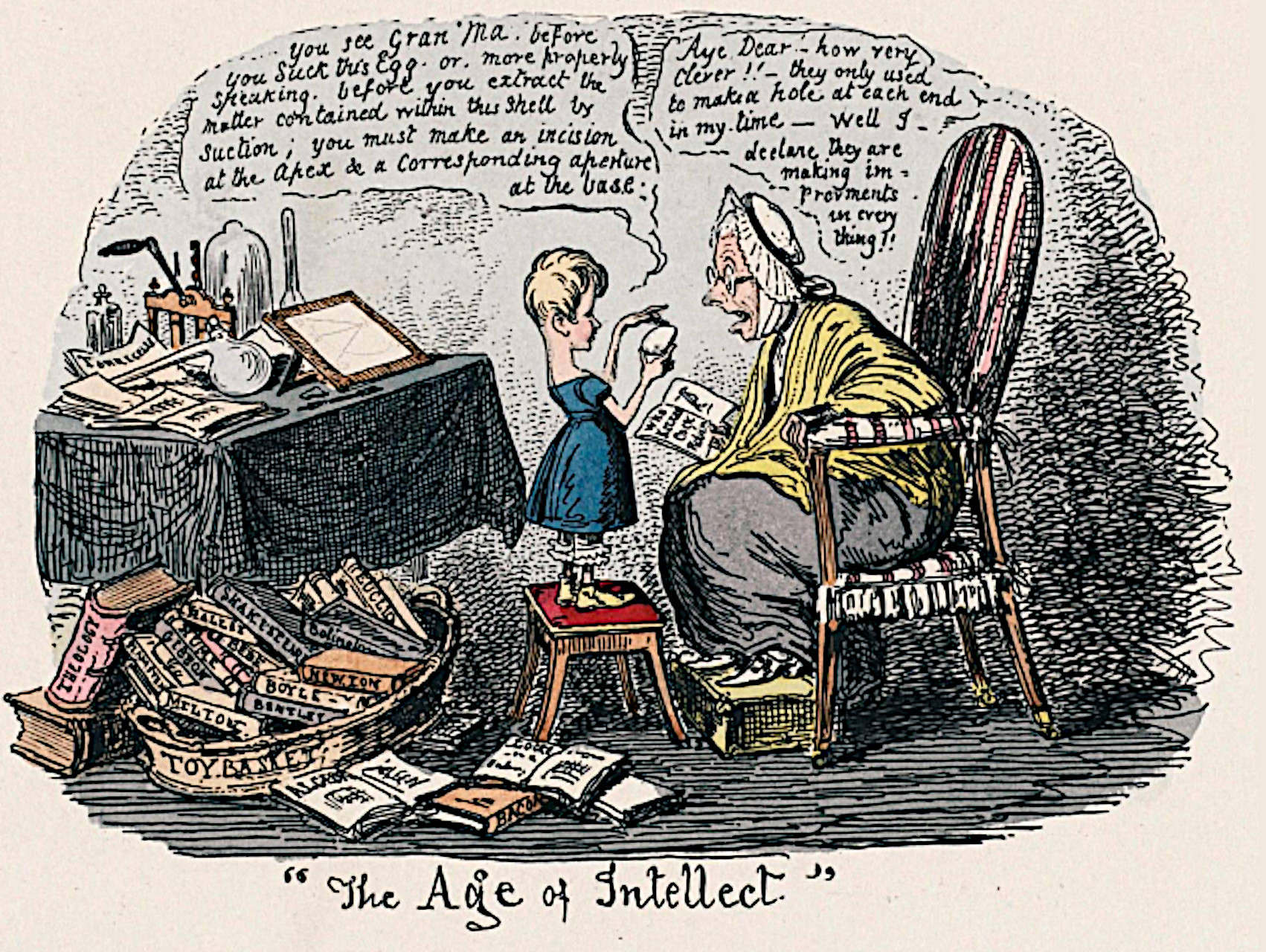
George Cruikshank (27 September 1792 – 1 February 1878) cartoon about teaching Grandma to suck eggs

Teaching (your) grandmother to suck eggs is a saying that refers to a person giving advice to another person in a subject with which the other person is already familiar (and probably more so than the person giving the advice).

== Origins of the phrase ==
The origins of the phrase are not clear. The Oxford English Dictionary and others suggest that it comes from a translation in 1707, by J. Stevens, of Spanish writer Francisco de Quevedo: "You would have me teach my Grandame to suck Eggs". A record from 1859 implies common usage by that time. Most likely the meaning of the idiom derives from the fact that before the advent of modern dentistry (and modern dental prostheses) many elderly people (grandparents) had very bad teeth, or no teeth, so that the simplest way for them to consume protein was to poke a pinhole in the shell of a raw egg and suck out the contents; therefore, a grandmother was usually already a practiced expert on sucking eggs and did not need anyone to show her how to do it.

== Notable early uses ==
- The History of Tom Jones, a Foundling, Henry Fielding (1749):
  I remember my old schoolmaster, who was a prodigious great scholar, used often to say, Polly matete cry town is my daskalon. The English of which, he told us, was, That a child may sometimes teach his grandmother to suck eggs.
- Letter from Percy Bysshe Shelley to Leigh Hunt, 15 August 1819: "But what am I about? If my grandmother sucks eggs, was it I who taught her?"

== Related phrases ==
The use of the phrase suck-egg for 'a silly person' is dated back to 1609 by the Oxford English Dictionary.
