= Deborah Landau =

American poet, essayist, and critic (born 1973

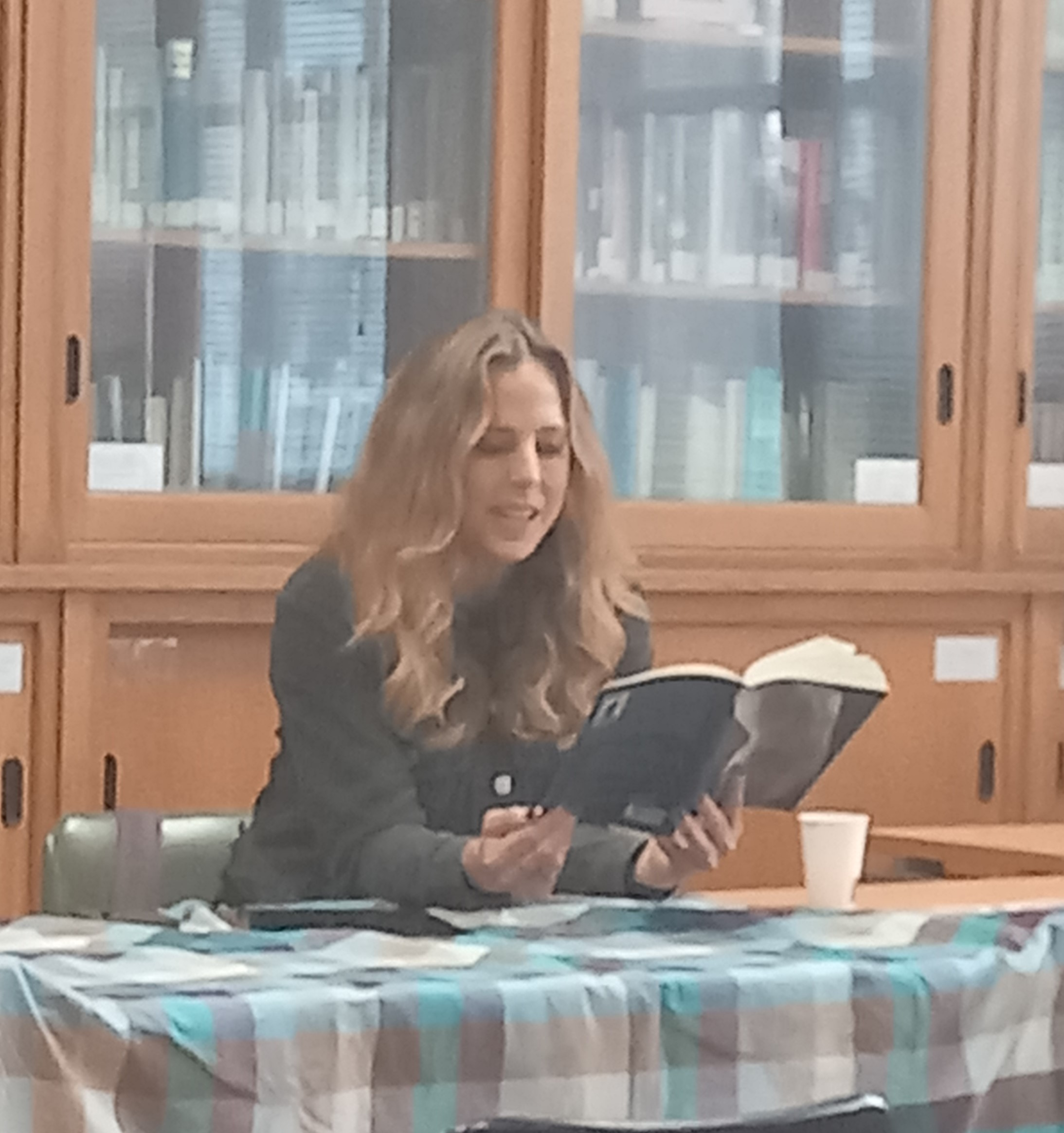
- Born: 1973 (age 52–53)
- Education: Stanford University; Columbia University; Brown University (PhD)
- Occupation: Poet
- Website: www.deborahlandau.com

Deborah Landau (born 1973) is an American poet, essayist, and critic.

Landau's "taut, elegant, highly controlled constructions" have been described as "confessional and direct, like Sylvia Plath and Allen Ginsberg." Her meditations upon yearning and selfhood are said to remind us "of the nuanced beauty of language." Jennifer Michael Hecht has praised her poems as "Terrificly smart, witty, and slightly terrifying." Nick DePascal asserts that Landau's work "accurately matches form to content" and "leads the reader down a particular path through style as much as the meaning of the actual words on the page...." Publishers Weekly has described her work as "haunting," "stunning," "dark, urgent, sexy, deeply sad, and, above all, powerful."

Landau's poems, essays, and reviews have appeared in The Paris Review, The New York Review of Books, The New Yorker, The Kenyon Review, American Poetry Review, The Best American Poetry, The Nation,The Best American Erotic Poems, The Wall Street Journal, Poetry, The New York Times, and The Nation, among other publications. Landau grew up in Ann Arbor, Michigan, graduated with distinction from Stanford University, where she was elected to Phi Beta Kappa, received a master's degree in English from Columbia University and a Ph.D. from Brown University, where she was a Jacob K. Javits Fellow in English and American Literature. In 2016 she was awarded a Guggenheim Fellowship.

Landau's most recent books are Skeletons (2023), Soft Targets (2019) and The Uses of the Body, which was published in 2015 by Copper Canyon Press and was a Lannan Literary Selection.

Deborah Landau is currently a professor and director of the Creative Writing Program at New York University.

== Bibliography ==
- Orchidelirium, Anhinga Press, 2003 (winner of the Anhinga Prize for Poetry)
- The Last Usable Hour, Copper Canyon Press, 2011.
- The Uses of the Body, Copper Canyon Press, 2015.
- Soft Targets, Copper Canyon Press, 2019. (winner of the 2019 Believer Book Award)
- Skeletons, Copper Canyon Press, April 2023.
