= Bitts =

Deck-fitting on a ship or boat, and used to secure ropes

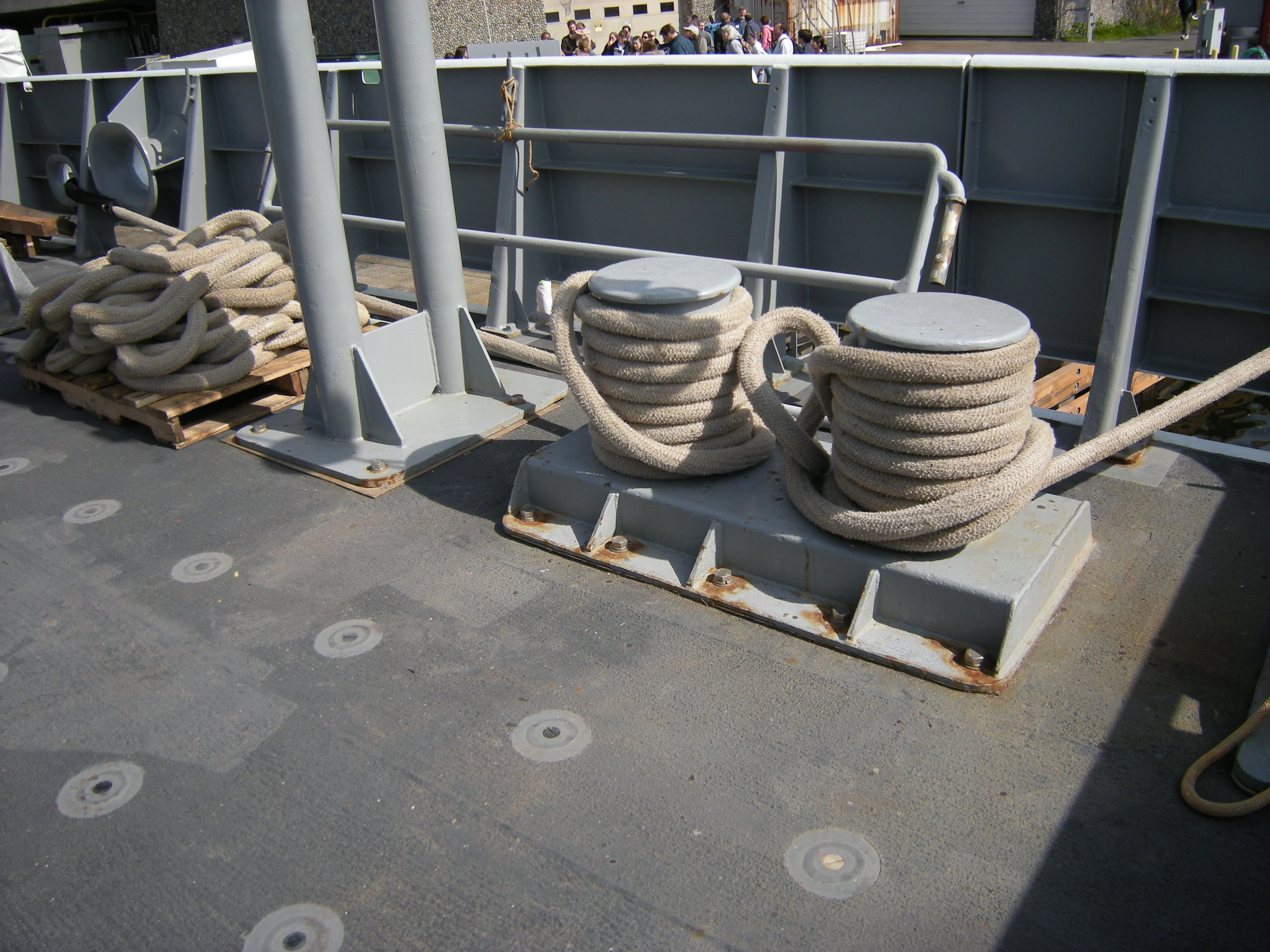
Shipboard bitts

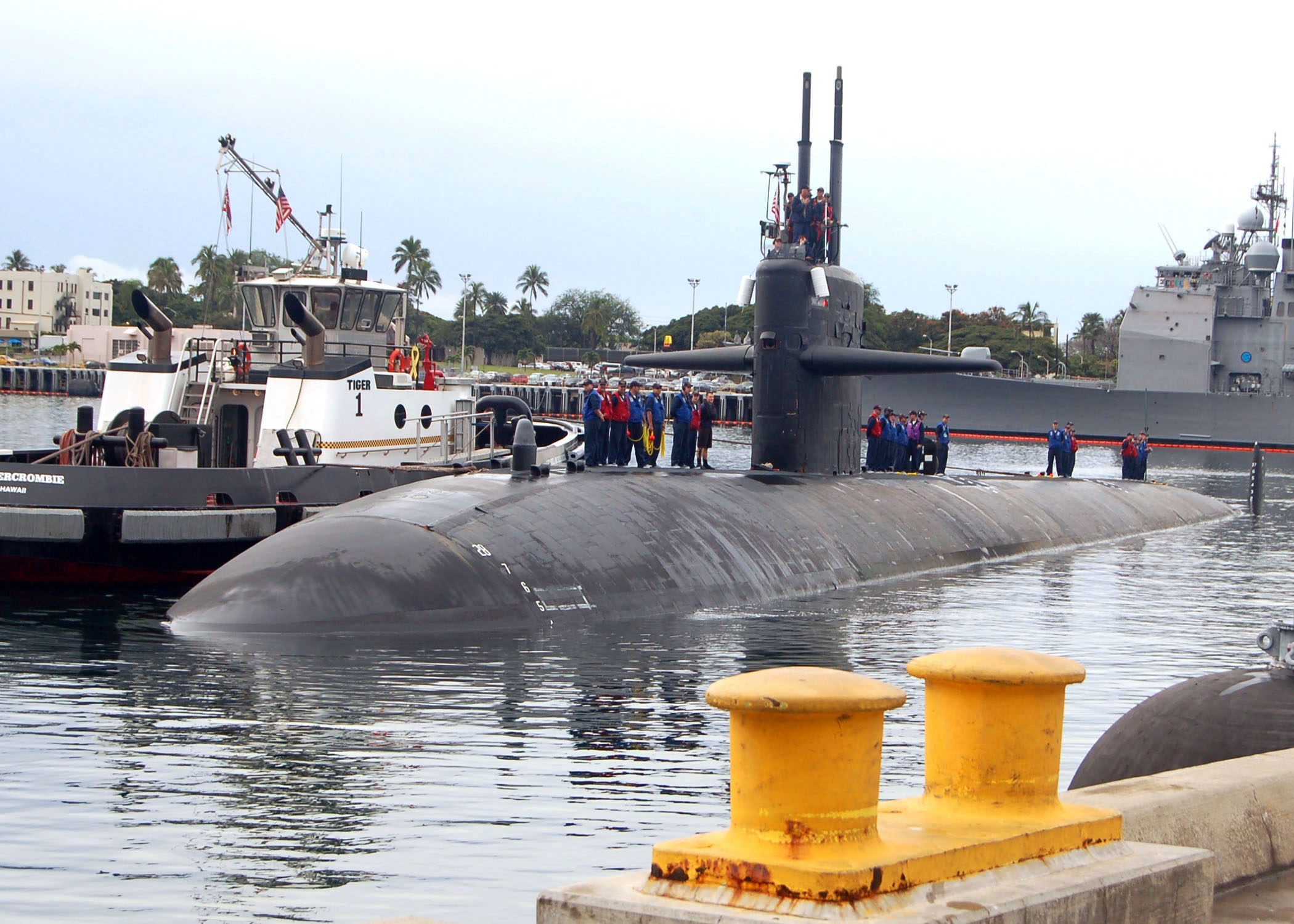
Shoreside bitts

Bitts are paired vertical wooden or metal posts mounted either aboard a ship or on a wharf, pier, or quay. The posts are used to secure mooring lines, ropes, hawsers, or cables. Bitts aboard wooden sailing ships (sometime called cable-bitts) were large vertical timbers mortised into the keel and used as the anchor cable attachment point. Bitts are carefully manufactured and maintained to avoid any sharp edges that might chafe and weaken the mooring lines.

== Use ==
Mooring lines may be laid around the bitts either singly or in a figure-8 pattern with the friction against tension increasing with each successive turn. As a verb bitt means to take another turn increasing the friction to slow or adjust a mooring ship's relative movement.

Mooring fixtures of similar purpose:

- A bollard is a single vertical post useful to receive a spliced loop at the end of a mooring line.
- A cleat has horizontal horns.
