= Trevor Corson =

American writer

Trevor Corson is an author, journalist and essayist, editor, and teacher.

Trevor Corson is a book author, magazine journalist and essayist, editor, and teacher. He has written for The New York Times, The Wall Street Journal, The Los Angeles Times, The Boston Globe, The Atlantic Monthly, The American Prospect, The Nation and other publications on a wide range of topics, including international affairs, military strategy and history, politics and economics, science, medicine, food, religion, and race.

Corson's books are in the genre of narrative nonfiction. Using journalistic storytelling, Corson has explored themes related to how scientific knowledge, folk culture, foodways, and natural ecosystems interact. His first book, The Secret Life of Lobsters was based on two years he spent working as a commercial fisherman in Maine and another year of extensive research into biological and ecological scientific literature. The book began as an Atlantic Monthly centerpiece article that was included in The Best American Science Writing. The Secret Life of Lobsters was named a best nature book of the year by USA Today and Discover, a best book of the year by Time Out New York, and went on to become an Amazon worldwide bestseller in the popular-science category.

Corson's second book, The Story of Sushi: An Unlikely Saga of Raw Fish and Rice (originally titled The Zen of Fish in hardcover), was based on months of immersion research in sushi kitchens in Los Angeles as well as study of the cultural history, natural history, and biology of sushi ingredients. The book was selected as an Editors’ Choice by the New York Times Book Review; it also won “Best American Food Literature Book” of 2007 in the Gourmand World Cookbook Awards and was selected as a Best Food Book of the Year by Zagat.

Corson's essays and articles have touched on many different topics, including medical ethics in Japan and other countries, the history of aerial bombing, harmful algae blooms, and the relationship between socialism and capitalism in Finland, to name a few.

Corson has been a frequent public speaker and his work has been featured on CBS Sunday Morning, ABC World News with Charles Gibson, NPR's All Things Considered and Talk of the Nation, WNYC's Radiolab, the podcast Pitchfork Economics with Nick Hanauer, as well as numerous local television and radio programs; he has also appeared on the Food Network’s hit TV show Iron Chef America.

A graduate of the Sidwell Friends School in Washington D.C., Corson received a scholarship through Sidwell to be an exchange student in China, where he spent two years studying Chinese Taoist and Buddhist philosophy at Beijing Normal University. After then graduating from Princeton University, Corson received a Japanese Ministry of Education Fellowship at Taisho University, from where he conducted ethnographic research on Japanese Buddhist practice.

Corson began his journalism career as an intern at The Atlantic Monthly and soon started publishing articles in the magazine. Corson then became the managing editor of the literary magazine Transition, edited by Professor Henry Louis Gates Jr. at Harvard University, from 1999 to 2001, when the magazine won three consecutive Alternative Press Awards for International Reporting and was nominated for a National Magazine Award in General Excellence.

In 2005 Corson was a Knight Fellow at M.I.T. in the Investigative Science Journalism Boot Camp and in 2008 he was a Visiting Writer in the University of Memphis MFA program. In 2010 he taught at The New School in the Foreign Languages program and from 2011 to 2013, he developed an Asian Studies program at Brooklyn Friends School and taught in both the World Languages and the History Departments. From 2014 to 2016, Corson completed a mid-career MFA in nonfiction writing, with a specialization in science writing and a graduate certificate in philosophy of biology, at Columbia University while serving as a Teaching Fellow in the Undergraduate Writing Program there in the Department of English. Corson subsequently served as Lecturer & Course Co-director in American Studies in Columbia's Undergraduate Writing Program. In 2016 he taught narrative science reporting and writing in the graduate program in Science and Medical Journalism at the Boston University College of Communication. From 2016 to 2018 he was an adjunct assistant professor of literary science writing in the graduate nonfiction writing program in the Columbia University School of the Arts.

Since 2019 Corson has worked in various capacities at the University of Helsinki on projects related to science narrative, science communication, and philosophy of science, including teaching courses to PhD students in the sciences and consulting with senior researchers across a variety of scientific fields. In 2020 he founded and is the current director of NeuWrite Nordic, a regional branch of the international collaborative science-writing workshop NeuWrite, established by the chair of biological sciences and the graduate writing program at Columbia University. NeuWrite Nordic is supported by a grant from the Finnish Kone Foundation (fi:Koneen Säätiö).

== Personal life ==
Corson is married to Finnish journalist Anu Partanen. They moved to Finland in 2018.

== Books ==
- The Secret Life of Lobsters: How Fishermen and Scientists Are Unraveling the Mysteries of Our Favorite Crustacean (Print). New York, NY: HarperCollins. 2004. ISBN 0-06-055558-0.
- The Zen of Fish: The Story of Sushi, from Samurai to Supermarket. HarperCollins. 2007. ISBN 978-0-06-088350-8.
- The Story of Sushi: An Unlikely Saga of Raw Fish and Rice. Harper Perennial, Reprint edition [originally published as The Zen of Fish]. 2008. ISBN 978-0-06-088351-5.
