= Anu Partanen =

Journalist (born 1975)

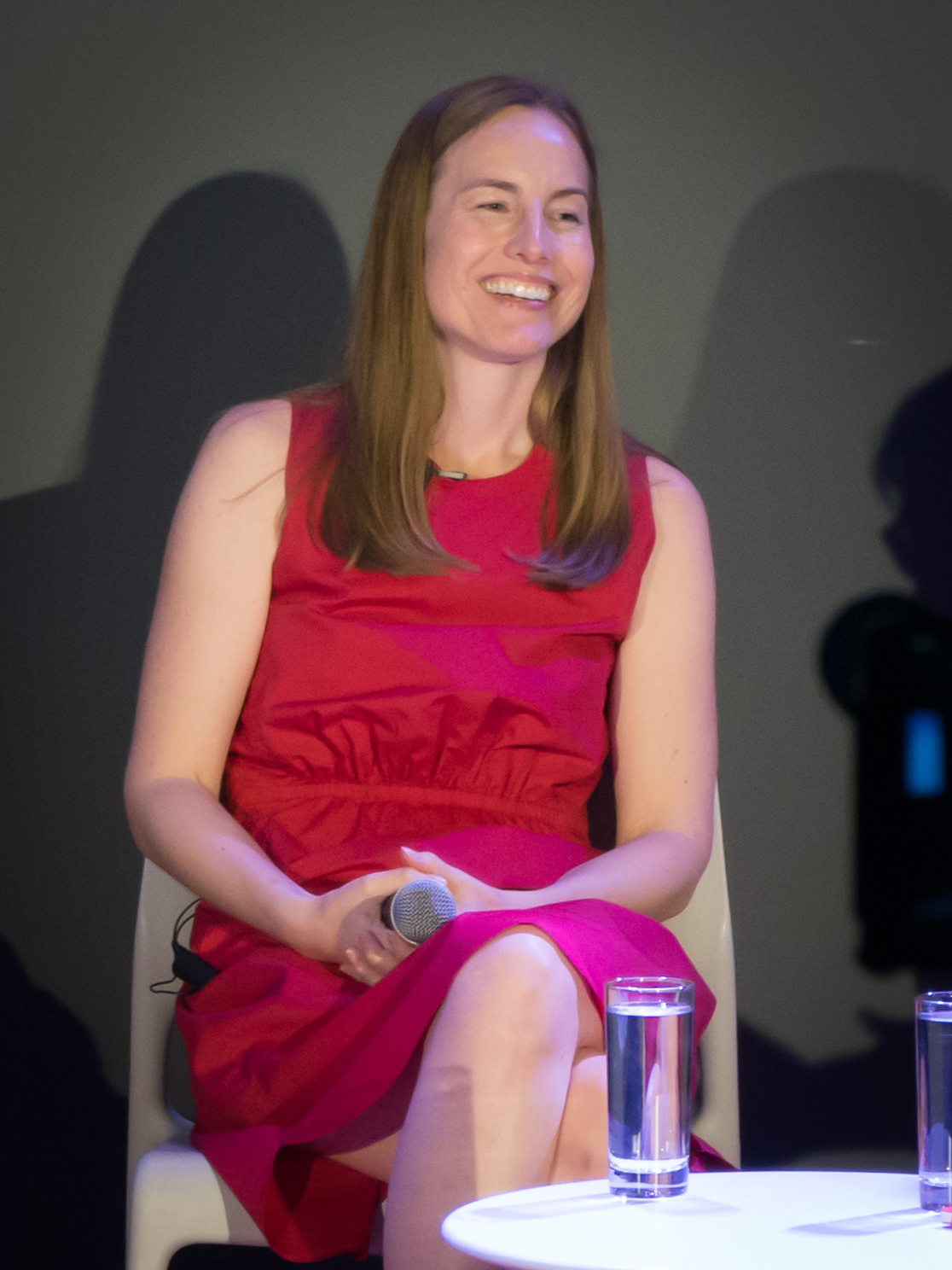
Anu Partanen speaks at the New America Foundation in New York City, 2016

Anu Partanen (born 1975) is a Finnish journalist living in the United States. She became a naturalized American citizen in 2013. Her book The Nordic Theory of Everything: In Search of a Better Life was published in June 2016 by HarperCollins.

In March 2016, Partanen's article "What Americans Don't Get About Nordic Countries" was published in The Atlantic. The article was shared 130,000 times on Facebook in six days. Partanen has also written for The New York Times and Helsingin Sanomat. Before she moved to the United States, she performed as a regular commentator on a journalist's panel discussion program on Yle TV2.

Partanen is married to American writer Trevor Corson.
