= Panopticon gaze =

The panopticon gaze (from panopticon) is an ideological phrase, a metaphor. The panopticon gaze is the idea of a silent, unknown overseer in the society such as the government that subconsciously controlled all aspects of life. It symbolises extreme transparency within the society where the rulers or leaders can look down and know, being able to see exactly what is going on, influencing the actions of every individual.

Milan Kundera used this idea in his fictional novel about the Soviet Invasion of Czechoslovakia in 1968, The Unbearable Lightness of Being.
