= Battle of egos =

Metaphorical phrase

A battle of egos is a phrase used metaphorically in an often pejorative manner to describe competitions that are based on pride and often entail prodigious and arrogant demonstrations of prowess. This type of dueling, which is conceptually similar to a pissing contest, is often seen as an arrogant way to determine who is the "bigger man" (as far as being superior right in an argument) by a competitive methodology that is not especially productive. This colloquial usage differs from the psychological concept of the "ego," which, according to psychoanalytic theory, refers to the rational part of the personality that mediates between the id, superego, and reality.

== Notable mentions ==
A Tehran newspaper described the dispute between George W. Bush and Saddam Hussein as a battle of egos. The competition between television advertisements during the Super Bowl has been described as a battle of egos nicknamed "The Ego Bowl". A 1998 collective bargaining dispute in the National Basketball Association was also described as a battle of egos.

== See also ==
- Egotism
- Narcissism
- Pissing contest
