= 2002 in poetry =

Nationality words link to articles with information on the nation's poetry or literature (for instance, Irish or France).

== Events ==
- March 16 — Authorities in Saudi Arabia arrest and jail poet Abdul Mohsen Musalam and dismiss a newspaper editor following the publication of Musalam's poem "The Corrupt on Earth" which criticizes the state's Islamic judiciary, accusing some judges of being corrupt and issuing unfair rulings for their own personal benefit.
- August 22 — Poet Ron Silliman starts his popular and controversial weblog Silliman's Blog which will become one of the most popular blogs devoted largely to contemporary poetry and poetics. (By August 2006, the blog will reach a total of 800,000 hits and get its next 100,000 by early November.).
- September — Amiri Baraka (b. 1934), an African-American poet and political activist from Newark, New Jersey who was appointed the second Poet Laureate of New Jersey, ignites a controversy and accusations of anti-Semitism with a public reading of "Somebody Blew Up America" at the Geraldine R. Dodge Poetry Festival near Stanhope, New Jersey. Baraka's poem discusses the September 11 attacks in a way that is highly critical of racism in America, includes angry depictions of public figures such as Rudolph Giuliani, Trent Lott, Clarence Thomas, Condoleezza Rice, Colin Powell and Ward Connerly, accuses Israel of involvement in the World Trade Center attacks, and supports the theory that the United States government knew about the attacks in advance. Amid public outrage and pressure from state leaders, Baraka is asked to resign as the Poet Laureate by New Jersey Governor Jim McGreevey who had appointed him to the post two months earlier. Baraka refuses and, because there is no legal mechanism provided in the law to remove him as poet laureate, the state legislature and governor abolishes the position to remove him effective 2 July 2003.
- After Ghazi al-Gosaibi, the Saudi Arabian ambassador to Britain, publishes a poem praising a suicide bomber who had killed himself and two Israelis after blowing himself up in a supermarket, the ambassador is recalled home.
- The office of Canadian Parliamentary Poet Laureate is instituted (see "Awards and honors" section below).
- The office of Edinburgh Makar is instituted in Scotland, with Stewart Conn as first incumbent.
- Bowery Poetry Club, a New York City poetry performance space, is founded by Bob Holman.
- Fulcrum, An annual of poetry and aesthetics is founded in the United States.
- Influential Chinese literary magazine Tamen ("They/Them") is revived as a webzine at www.tamen.net.

== Works published in English ==
Listed by nation where the work was first published and again by the poet's native land, if different; substantially revised works listed separately:

=== Australia ===
- Alison Croggon, Attempts at Being, Salt Publishing, ISBN 1-876857-42-0.
- Robert Gray, Afterimages
- Emma Lew, Anything the Landlord Touches, won the 2003 C. J. Dennis Prize for Poetry and was short-listed for the Kenneth Slessor Prize for Poetry that same year
- Chris Mansell:
  - Stalking the Rainbow (PressPress, 2002)
  - Fickle Brat (IP Digital, Brisbane, 2002)
- Les Murray:
  - Poems the Size of Photographs, Duffy & Snellgrove and Carcanet
  - New Collected Poems, Duffy & Snellgrove; Carcanet, 2003

=== Canada ===
- Margaret Avison, Concrete and Wild Carrot
- Christian Bök, ’Pataphysics: The Poetics of an Imaginary Science ISBN 978-0-8101-1877-5
- Dionne Brand, thirsty
- Michael Boughn, Dislocations in Crystal (Coach House Books) ISBN 978-1-55245-111-3
- Louis Cabri, The Mood Embosser (Coach House Books) ISBN 978-1-55245-095-6
- Margaret Christakos, Excessive Love Prostheses (Coach House Books) ISBN 978-1-55245-102-1
- Lise Downe, Disturbances of Progress (Coach House Books) ISBN 978-1-55245-112-0
- Rob Fitterman, Metropolis (Book 2) (Coach House Books) ISBN 978-1-55245-104-5
- Laura Lush:
  - The First Day of Winter: Poetry, Vancouver: Ronsdale Press
  - Going to the Zoo, Winnipeg: Turnstone Press
- Don McKay, Vis à Vis: Field Notes on Poetry & Wilderness
- George McWhirter, The Book of Contradictions
- Jay Millar, Mycological Studies (Coach House Books) ISBN 978-1-55245-103-8
- P. K. Page, Planet Earth: Poems Selected and New, edited and with an introduction by Eric Ormsby, Erin, ON: Porcupine's Quill
- Joe Rosenblatt, Parrot fever. collages by Michel Christensen. Toronto: Exile.
- Raymond Souster, Take Me Out to the Ballgame. Ottawa: Oberon Press.

=== India, in English ===
- Meena Alexander, Illiterate Heart ( Poetry in English ), Evanston, Illinois: TriQuarterly Books/Northwestern University Press, by an Indian writing, living, and publishing in the United States
- Smita Agarwal, Wish-granting Words,(Poetry in English) New Delhi: Ravi Dayal Publisher, 2002. ISBN 81-7530-046-9
- Sujata Bhatt, A Colour for Solitude ( Poetry in English ), Carcanet Press
- Keki Daruwalla, The Map-maker ( Poetry in English ), Ravi Dayal
- Ranjit Hoskote, editor, Reasons for Belonging, Fourteen Contemporary Indian Poets ( Poetry in English ), New Delhi: Viking/Penguin Books India; anthology including work from: Jerry Pinto, Vijay Nambisan, C. P. Surendran, Smita Agarwal, Arundhati Subramaniam, Jeet Thayil, Tabish Khair, Ranjit Hoskote and Rukhmini Bhaya Nair, Vivek Narayanan, Gavin Barrett, Anjum Hasan and H. Masud Taj
- Sudeep Sen, Monsoon, re-issued in 2005 as Rain ( Poetry in English ); London: Aark Arts, ISBN 1-899179-10-0
- C. P. Surendran, Canaries on the Moon ( Poetry in English ), Kozhikode: Yeti, Chennai.
- Mallika Sengupta, Carriers Of Fire, (translated from the original Bengali, Kolkata: Bhashanagar

=== Ireland ===
- Vona Groarke, Flight, Oldcastle: The Gallery Press, Ireland
- Justin Quinn:
  - Fuselage Oldcastle: The Gallery Press,
  - Gathered Beneath the Storm: Wallace Stevens, Nature and Community, University College of Dublin Press, 2002 (criticism)

=== New Zealand ===
- James K. Baxter, The Tree House: James K. Baxter's Poems for Children (posthumous), the first illustrated edition of his work for children
- Janet Charman, Snowing Down South, Auckland: Auckland University Press
- Alan Brunton, Fq, a sequence of 144 poems (posthumous)
- Cilla McQueen, Soundings, Otago University Press
- Mike Minehan, O Jerusalem: James K. Baxter an Intimate Memoir
- Kendrick Smithyman, posthumous:
  - Last Poems, Auckland: Holloway Press, designed by Tara hir poi a pek fhj nbb a: Auckland University Press
- Stephanie de Montalk, The Scientific Evidence of Dr Wang, Victoria University Press
- Kay McKenzie Cooke, Feeding the Dogs, Otago University Press)

==== Poets in Best New Zealand Poems ====
Best New Zealand Poems series, an annual online anthology, is started this year with Iain Sharp as the first annual editor. Twenty-five poems by 25 New Zealand poets are selected from the previous year. The first selection is called Best New Zealand Poetry 2001. Unlike The Best American Poetry series, the year named in each edition refers to the year the poems were originally published, not the following year, when the collection is put together and made public. Sharp chose poems published in 2001 from these poets:

- James K. Baxter
- Jenny Bornholdt
- Bernard Brown
- James Brown
- Alan Brunton
- Kate Camp
- Alistair Te Ariki Campbell
- Allen Curnow
- Leigh Davis
- Chloe Gordon
- Bernadette Hall
- Dinah Hawken
- Anna Jackson
- Jan Kemp (writer)
- James Naughton
- Gregory O'Brien
- Peter Olds
- Bob Orr
- Vincent O'Sullivan
- Chris Price
- Richard Reeve
- Elizabeth Smither
- Brian Turner
- Ian Wedde
- Nick Williamson

=== United Kingdom ===
- Neil Astley, editor, Staying Alive: real poems for unreal times (anthology)
- Anthony Burgess, Revolutionary Sonnets and Other Poems, edited by Kevin Jackson
- Ciarán Carson: The Inferno of Dante Alighieri (translator), Granta, awarded the Oxford-Weidenfeld Translation Prize
- Carol Ann Duffy, Feminine Gospels Picador
- Elaine Feinstein, Collected Poems and Translations, Carcanet
- James Fenton: An Introduction to English Poetry
- Paul Henry, The Slipped Leash, Seren
- Ted Hughes, Selected Poems, 1957–1994 (Farrar, Straus & Giroux); a New York Times "notable book of the year"
- Glyn Maxwell, The Nerve (Houghton Mifflin); a New York Times "notable book of the year" (British poet living in America, poetry editor of The New Republic magazine)
- Sean O'Brien:
  - Cousin Coat: Selected Poems 1976–2001 (Picador)
  - With John Kinsella and Peter Porter, Rivers (Fremantle Arts Centre Press, Australia)
- Alice Oswald:
  - Dart, Faber and Faber, ISBN 0-571-21410-X
  - Co-editor, with Peter Oswald and Robert Woof), Earth Has Not Any Thing to Shew More Fair: A Bicentennial Celebration of Wordsworth's "Sonnet Composed upon Westminster Bridge" Shakespeare's Globe & The Wordsworth Trust, ISBN 1-870787-84-6
- John Heath-Stubbs, The Return of the Cranes
- Peter Redgrove, From the Virgil Caverns
- R.S. Thomas, Residues (posthumous)
- Hugo Williams, Collected Poems, Faber and Faber

=== United States ===
- Meena Alexander, Illiterate Heart, Evanston, Illinois: TriQuarterly Books/Northwestern University Press, by an Indian writing living in and published in the United States
- John Ashbery, Chinese Whispers
- Frank Bidart, Music Like Dirt (Sarabande Books), the only poetry chapbook ever nominated for a Pulitzer Prize
- Billy Collins, Nine Horses: Poems (Random House); a New York Times "notable book of the year" (ISBN 0-375-50381-1)
- Robert Creeley, guest editor, The Best American Poetry 2002
- Jim Dodge – Rain on the River
- Alan Dugan, Poems Seven: New and Complete Poetry (Seven Stories); a New York Times "notable book of the year"
- Michael S. Harper, Selected Poems, ARC Publications
- Paul Hoover, Winter Mirror, (Flood Editions)
- Kenneth Koch:
  - Sun Out: Selected Poems, 1952–1954, New York: Knopf
  - A Possible World, New York: Knopf
- Abba Kovner, Sloan-Kettering: Poems (Schocken); a New York Times "notable book of the year"
- Brad Leithauser, Darlington's Fall: A Novel in Verse (Knopf); a 5,700-line verse novel in 10-line stanzas, irregularly rhymed; a New York Times "notable book of the year"
- Glyn Maxwell, The Nerve (Houghton Mifflin); a New York Times "notable book of the year" (British poet living in America, poetry editor of The New Republic magazine)
- J.D. McClatchy, Hazmat: Poems (Knopf); a New York Times "notable book of the year"
- Czesław Miłosz, New and Collected Poems: 1931–2001 (Ecco/HarperCollins); a New York Times "notable book of the year"
- Paul Muldoon, Moy Sand and Gravel, winner of the 2003 Pulitzer Prize for Poetry and Griffin Poetry Prize and shortlisted for the 2002 T. S. Eliot Prize
- Lorine Niedecker, Lorine Niedecker: Collected Works, edited by Jenny Penberthy (University of California Press), posthumous
- Mary Oliver, What Do We Know
- Molly Peacock, Cornucopia: New & Selected Poems
- Carl Phillips, Rock Harbor
- Marie Ponsot, Springing: New and Selected Poems (Knopf); a New York Times "notable book of the year"
- Claudia Rankine and Juliana Spahr, editors, American Women Poets in the 21st Century: Where Lyric Meets Language, Wesleyan University Press, ISBN 978-0-8195-6546-4, anthology including work by Lucie Brock-Broido, Harryette Mullen, Ann Lauterbach, Mei-mei Berssenbrugge, Brenda Hillman and Jorie Graham
- Margaret Reynolds, editor, The Sappho Companion (scholarship) Palgrave Macmillan, ISBN 978-0-312-29510-3 ISBN 0-312-29510-3
- W. G. Sebald, After Nature (Random House); a book-length poem; a New York Times "notable book of the year"
- Aharon Shabtai, Artzenu (Hebrew: "Our Land")
- Adam Zagajewski, Without End: New and Selected Poems (Farrar, Straus & Giroux); a New York Times "notable book of the year"

==== Poets in The Best American Poetry 2002 ====
Poems from these 75 poets were in The Best American Poetry 2002, David Lehman, editor; Robert Creeley, guest editor:

- Rae Armantrout
- John Ashbery
- Amiri Baraka
- Charles Bernstein
- Anselm Berrigan
- Frank Bidart
- Jenny Boully
- T. Alan Broughton
- Michael Burkard
- Anne Carson
- Elizabeth Biller Chapman
- Tom Clark
- Peter Cooley
- Clark Coolidge
- Ruth Danon
- Diane di Prima
- Theodore Enslin
- Elaine Equi
- Clayton Eshleman
- Norman Finkelstein
- Jeffrey Franklin
- Benjamin Friedlander
- Gene Frumkin
- Forrest Gander
- Peter Gizzi
- Louise Glück
- Albert Goldbarth
- Donald Hall
- Michael S. Harper
- Everett Hoagland
- Fanny Howe
- Ronald Johnson
- Maxine Kumin
- Bill Kushner
- Joseph Lease
- Timothy Liu
- Mộng-Lan
- Jackson Mac Low
- Nathaniel Mackey
- Steve Malmude
- Sarah Manguso
- Harry Mathews
- Duncan McNaughton
- W. S. Merwin
- Philip Metres
- Jennifer Moxley
- Eileen Myles
- Maggie Nelson
- Charles North
- Alice Notley
- D. Nurkse
- Sharon Olds
- George Oppen
- Jena Osman
- Carl Phillips
- Pam Rehm
- Adrienne Rich
- Corinne Robins
- Elizabeth Robinson
- Ira Sadoff
- Hugh Seidman
- Reginald Shepherd
- Ron Silliman
- Dale Smith
- Gustaf Sobin
- Juliana Spahr
- John Taggart
- Sam Truitt
- Jean Valentine
- Lewis Warsh
- Claire Nicolas White
- Nathan Whiting
- Dara Wier
- Charles Wright
- John Yau

== Works published in other languages ==
=== China ===
- Han Dong:
  - Baba zai tianshang kan wo ("Daddy's Watching Me in Heaven"), Hebei: jiaoyu chubanshe,
  - Jiaocha paodong ("Running Criss-cross"), Dunhuang: wenyi chubanshe
- He Xiaozhu, 6 ge dongci, huo pingguo ("6 Verbs, or Apples"), Hebei: jiaoyu chubanshe
- Jimu Langge, Jingqiaoqiao de zuolun ("The silent revolver"), Hebei: jiaoyu chubanshe

=== French language ===
==== Canada, in French ====
- Denise Desautels, Pendant la mort, Montréal: Québec Amérique
- Madeleine Gagnon, Le chant de la terre : Poèmes choisis 1978–2002, anthologie préparée par Paul Chanel Malenfant, Montréal, Typo
- Pierre Nepveu, Lignes aériennes, Montréal: Éditions du Noroît
- Madeleine Ouellette-Michalska, Le cycle des migrations, Montréal: Le Noroît
- Jean Royer, Poèmes de veille, Montréal: Le Noroît

==== France ====
- Chris Wallace-Crabbe, La Poésie Australienne, Valenciennes: Presses Universitaires, (with Simone Kadi), French translation of the work of this Australian poet

=== India ===
In each section, listed in alphabetical order by first name:

==== Hindi ====
- Gulzar, Raat Pashmine Ki, New Delhi: Rupa& Co.; in both Urdu and Hindi
- Kunwar Narain, In Dino, New Delhi: Rajkamal Prakashan, ISBN 81-267-0594-9
- Rituraj, Leela Mukharvinda, New Delhi: Medha Books
- Vinod Kumar Shukla, Atrikt Nahin, New Delhi: Vani Prakashan

==== Other in India ====
- Bharat Majhi, Saralarekha, Bhubaneswar: Paschima; Oriya-language
- Chandrakanta Murasingh, Ruphaini Buduk Ani Nogo, Agartala: Tripura Publisher: Agartala; Kokborok-language
- Gulzar, Raat Pashmine Ki, New Delhi: Rupa& Co.; in both Urdu and Hindi
- Joy Goswami, Horiner Jonyo Ekok, Kolkata: Ananda Publishers, ISBN 81-7756-240-1; Bengali-language
- K. Satchidanandan, Malayalam-language:
  - Bharateeya Kavitayile Pratirodha Paramparyam, ("The Tradition of Dissent of Indian Poetry"); scholarship
  - Vikku, ("Stammer")
- K. Siva Reddy; Telugu-language:
  - Antarjanam, Hyderabad: Jhari Poetry Circle
  - Vrittalekhini, Hyderabad: Jhari Poetry Circle
- Kutti Revathi, Mulaigal ("Breasts"). Chennai: Thamizhini; Tamil-language
- Kynpham Sing Nongkynrih; Kahsi-language:
  - Ka Samoi jong ka Lyer ("The Season of the Wind"), Shillong: Author
  - Ki Mawsiang ka Sohra ("The Ancient Rocks of Cherra"), Shillong: Author
  - Ki Jingkynmaw (Remembrances), Shillong: S. R. Lanong
- Nirendranath Chakravarti, Dekha Hobey, Kolkata: Ananda Publishers; Bengali-language
- Yash Sharma, Bedi Pattan Sanjh Mallah, publisher: Vaasu Prakashan, Jammu; Dogri-language

=== Poland ===
- Ewa Lipska, Uwaga: stopień, Krakow: Wydawnictwo literackie
- Czesław Miłosz, Druga przestrzen ("The Second Space"); Cracow: Znak
- Tadeusz Różewicz, Szara strefa ("Gray Zone"), Wrocław: Wydawnictwo Dolnośląskie
- Jarosław Marek Rymkiewicz, Zachód słońca w Milanówku ("Sunset in Milanówek"), Warsaw: Sic!

=== Other languages ===
- Christoph Buchwald, general editor, and Lutz Seiler, guest editor, Jahrbuch der Lyrik 2003 ("Poetry Yearbook 2003"), publisher: Beck; anthology
- Klaus Høeck, Projekt Perseus, publisher: Arena; Denmark
- Rami Saari, Kamma, Kamma milxama ("So Much, So Much War"), Israel
- Maria Luisa Spaziani, Poesie dalla mano sinistra, Italy
- Wisława Szymborska: Chwila ("Moment"), Poland
- Søren Ulrik Thomsen, Det værste og det bedste, illustrated by Ib Spang Olsen; Denmark

== Awards and honors ==
=== Australia ===
- C. J. Dennis Prize for Poetry: Robert Gray, Afterimages
- Dinny O'Hearn Poetry Prize: After Images by Robert Gray
- Kenneth Slessor Prize for Poetry: Alan Wearne, The Lovemakers
- Mary Gilmore Prize: Geraldine McKenzie, Duty

=== Canada ===
- Gerald Lampert Award: Aislinn Hunter, Into the Early Hours
- Archibald Lampman Award: Armand Garnet Ruffo, At Geronimo's Grave
- Atlantic Poetry Prize: M. Travis Lane, Keeping Afloat
- The office of Canadian Parliamentary Poet Laureate is instituted, George Bowering is the first appointee and will serve until 2004
- 2002 Governor General's Awards: Roy Miki, Surrender (English); Robert Dickson, Humains paysages en temps de paix relative (French)
- Griffin Poetry Prize: Canada: Christian Bök, Eunoia; International, in the English Language: Alice Notley, Disobedience
- Pat Lowther Award: Heather Spears, Required Reading: A Witness in Words and Drawings to the Reena Virk Trials 1998-2000
- Prix Alain-Grandbois: Michel Beaulieu, Trivialités
- Dorothy Livesay Poetry Prize: Karen Solie, Short Haul Engine
- Prix Émile-Nelligan: Benoît Jutras, Nous serons sans voix

=== New Zealand ===
- Prime Minister's Awards for Literary Achievement:
- Montana New Zealand Book Awards (no poetry category winner this year) First-book award for poetry: Chris Price, Husk, Auckland University Press

=== United Kingdom ===
- Cholmondeley Award: Moniza Alvi, David Constantine, Liz Lochhead, Brian Patten
- Eric Gregory Award: Caroline Bird, Christopher James, Jacob Polley, Luke Heeley, Judith Lal, David Leonard Briggs, Eleanor Rees, Kathryn Simmonds
- Forward Poetry Prize Best Collection): Peter Porter, Max is Missing (Picador); Best First Collection: Tom French, Touching the Bones (The Gallery Press)
- Queen's Gold Medal for Poetry: Peter Porter
- T. S. Eliot Prize (United Kingdom and Ireland): Alice Oswald, Dart
- Whitbread Award for poetry (United Kingdom):

=== United States ===
- Agnes Lynch Starrett Poetry Prize awarded to Shao Wei for Pulling a Dragon's Teeth
- Aiken Taylor Award for Modern American Poetry, Grace Schulman
- AML Awards for poetry to Kimberly Johnson for Leviathan with a Hook
- Arthur Rense Prize for poetry awarded to B.H. Fairchild by the American Academy of Arts and Letters
- Bernard F. Connors Prize for Poetry, Timothy Donnelly, "His Long Imprison'd Thought"
- Bobbitt National Prize for Poetry, Alice Fulton for Felt
- Brittingham Prize in Poetry, Anna George Meek, Acts of Contortion
- Frost Medal: Galway Kinnell
- National Book Award for poetry (United States): Ruth Stone, In the Next Galaxy
- Poet Laureate of Virginia: George Garrett, two year appointment 2002 to 2004
- Pulitzer Prize for Poetry: Carl Dennis, Practical Gods
- Rhysling Award:
  - Lawrence Schimel, How to Make a Human (Long Form)
  - William John Watkins, We Die as Angels (Short Form)
- Robert Fitzgerald Prosody Award: Paul Fussell
- Ruth Lilly Poetry Prize: Lisel Mueller
- Wallace Stevens Award: Ruth Stone
- Whiting Awards: Elizabeth Arnold, David Gewanter, Joshua Weiner
- William Carlos Williams Award: Li-Young Lee, Book of My Nights (American Poets Continuum), Judge: Carolyn Kizer
- Fellowship of the Academy of American Poets: Sharon Olds

=== Other ===
- Grand Austrian State Prize for Literature (2001 prize given this year): Gert Jonke

== Deaths ==
Birth years link to the corresponding "[year] in poetry" article:

- February 9 – Ale Ahmad Suroor, 90 (born 1911), Indian Urdu-language poet
- March 9 – Hamish Henderson, 81 (born 1919), Scottish poet, folk song collector and soldier
- May 1 – Ebrahim Al-Arrayedh (إبراهيم العريّض) (born 1908), Bahraini poet
- June 14 – June Jordan, 65 (born 1936), Jamaican American poet, of breast cancer
- June 27 – Alan Brunton, 55 (born 1946), New Zealand poet and scriptwriter, died on visit to Amsterdam
- July 6 – Kenneth Koch, 77 (born 1925), American poet, of leukemia
- July 14 – Nabakanta Barua, also known as Ekhud Kokaideu, 75 (born 1926), Indian Assamese-language novelist and poet
- August 25 – Dorothy Hewett 79 (born 1923), Australian feminist writer
- September 27 – Charles Henri Ford, 89 (born 1908), American novelist, poet, filmmaker, photographer and collage artist
- October 21 – Harbhajan Singh, 82 (born 1920), Punjabi poet, critic, cultural commentator and translator
- October 28 – Annada Shankar Ray, 98 (born 1905), Bengali poet
- December 9 – Stan Rice, 60 (born 1942), American painter, educator, poet, husband of author Anne Rice, of brain cancer

== See also ==
- Poetry
- List of years in poetry
- List of poetry awards

== Notes ==
- "A Timeline of English Poetry" Web page of the Representative Poetry Online Web site, University of Toronto
