= The Best American Poetry 2002 =

2002 poetry anthology

The Best American Poetry 2002, a volume in The Best American Poetry series, was edited by David Lehman, with poems chosen by guest editor Robert Creeley.

The first print run for the book was 30,000.

Amy Bracken Sparks, reviewing the book in The Plain Dealer, wrote that Creeley's choices "are not poems accessible to all; they are innovative in both concept and structure, and therefore risk losing the reader. [...] Yes, it's a bit of work when not everything is explained. Pretension lurks about, but there's always Diane Di Prima keeping everything earthbound and Sharon Olds writing yet again about her father."

Carmela Ciuraru, writing in The San Diego Union-Tribune, called Creeley's selection "bold and unconventional. Even his selections of more 'established' names prove to be those who have defied people's expectations — poets such as John Ashbery, Anne Carson, Alice Notley and John Yau." Ciuraru found Juliana Spahr's prose poem "frustratingly tedius" but called the poem by Donald Hall "beautiful".

== Poets and poems included ==
Poet	Poem	Where poem previously appeared
Rae Armantrout	"Up to Speed"	Chicago Review
John Ashbery	"The Pearl Fishers"	Verse
Amiri Baraka	"The Golgotha Local"	Skanky Possum
Charles Bernstein	"12²"	Slope
Anselm Berrigan	from "Zero Star Hotel"	Bombay Gin
Frank Bidart	"Injunction"	Ploughshares
Jenny Boully	"The Body"	Seneca Review
T. Alan Broughton	"Ballad of the Comely Woman"	Beloit Poetry Journal
Michael Burkard	"What I Threw into the Grave"	jubilat
Anne Carson	"Opposed Glimpse of Alice James, Garth James, Henry James, Robertson James and William James"	The Threepenny Review
Elizabeth Biller Chapman	"On the Screened Porch"	Poetry
Tom Clark	"Lullaby for Cuckoo"	Skanky Possum
Peter Cooley	"Corpus Delicti"	Pleiades
Clark Coolidge	"Traced Red Dot"	New American Writing
Ruth Danon	"Long after (Mallarmé)"	3rd Bed
Diane di Prima	"Midsummer"	Barrow Street
Theodore Enslin	"Moon Cornering"	Chicago Review
Elaine Equi	"O Patriarchy"	Skanky Possum
Clayton Eshleman	"Animals out of the Snow"	Skanky Possum
Norman Finkelstein	"Drones and Chants"	Hambone
Jeffrey Franklin	"To a Student Who Reads 'The Second Coming' as Sexual Autobiography"	New England Review
Benjamin Friedlander	"Independence Day"	Can We Have Our Ball Back?
Gene Frumkin	"Surreal Love Life"	Hambone
Forrest Gander	"Carried Across"	The Kenyon Review
Peter Gizzi	"Beginning with a Phrase from Simone Weil"	Boston Review
Louise Glück	"Reunion"	Slate
Albert Goldbarth	"The Gold Star"	The Antioch Review
Donald Hall	"Affirmation"	The New Yorker
Michael S. Harper	"TCAT serenade: 4 4 98 (New Haven)"	Harvard Review
Everett Hoagland	"you: should be shoo be"	Crux
Fanny Howe	"9/11/2001"	Can We Have Our Ball Back?
Ronald Johnson	"Poem" ("across dark stream")	Hambone
Maxine Kumin	"Flying"	Connecticut Review
Bill Kushner	"Great"	Boondoggle
Joseph Lease	"Broken World" (For James Assatly)"	Colorado Review
Timothy Liu	"Felix Culpa"	Ploughshares
Mộng-Lan	"Trail"	jubilat
Jackson Mac Low	"And Even You Elephants? (Stein 139/Titles 35)"	Deluxe Rubber Chicken
Nathaniel Mackey	"On Antiphon Island"	jubilat
Steve Malmude	"Perfect Front Door"	The Hat
Sarah Manguso	"Address to Winnie in Paris"	jubilat
Harry Mathews	"Butter & Eggs"	Boston Review
Duncan McNaughton	"The quarry (1-13)"	Hambone
W. S. Merwin	"To My Father's Houses"	The New York Review of Books
Philip Metres	"Ashberries: Letters"	New England Review
Jennifer Moxley	"Behind the Orbits"	Pressed Wafer
Eileen Myles	"Sympathy"	American Poetry Review
Maggie Nelson	"Sunday Night"	The Hat
Charles North	"Sonnet"	Boston Review
Alice Notley	"Haunt"	Pharos
D. Nurkse	"Snapshot from Niagara"	Barrow Street
Sharon Olds	"Frontis Nulla Fides"	Ploughshares
George Oppen	"Twenty-six Fragments"	Facture
Jena Osman	"Starred Together"	Hambone
Carl Phillips	"Fretwork"	The Threepenny Review
Pam Rehm	"'A roof is no guarantee...'"	Chicago Review
Adrienne Rich	"Ends of the Earth"	American Poetry Review
Corinne Robins	"Les Demoiselles d'Avignon"	Talisman: A Journal of Contemporary Poetry and Poetics
Elizabeth Robinson	"Tenets of Roots and Trouble"	Hambone
Ira Sadoff	"Self-Portrait with Critic"	AGNI
Hugh Seidman	"I Do Not Know Myself"	Poetry
Reginald Shepherd	"You Also, Nightingale"	New England Review
Ron Silliman	"For Larry Eigner, Silent"	Facture
Dale Smith	"Poem after Haniel Long"	Mungo vs. Ranger
Gustaf Sobin	"In Way of Introduction"	Hambone
Juliana Spahr	"Some of We and the Land That Was Never Ours"	Chicago Review
John Taggart	"Call"	The Café Review
Sam Truitt	from "Raton Rex, Part I"	Boston Review
Jean Valentine	"Do flies remember us"	Colorado Review
Lewis Warsh	"Eye Contact"	The Hat
Claire Nicolas White	"Return to Saint Odilienberg, Easter 2000"	Witness
Nathan Whiting	"In Charge"	Hanging Loose
Dara Wier	"Illumined with the Light of Fitfully Burning Censers"	Volt
Charles Wright	"Nostalgia II"	Ploughshares
John Yau	"A Sheath of Pleasant Voices"	Verse

== See also ==
- 2002 in poetry
