= Hambone =

Hambone may refer to:

== People ==
- Hambone Willie Newbern (1899–1947), a guitar-playing blues musician
- Hambone Williams or Art Williams (1939–2018), American basketball player

== Other ==
- Hambone (magazine), a literary magazine
- Hambone, California, United States community
- Hambone or Juba dance, dance style
- "Hambone", a song by Red Saunders (musician)
- Hambone, a bowling term referring to four strikes in a row, coined by Rob Stone (sportscaster)
- Hambone's Meditations, a comic strip
- Hambone Award, annual trophy for most unusual pet injury

== See also ==
- Ham on the bone
