= Emily Pettit =

American poet, editor, and publisher

Emily Pettit is an American poet, editor, and publisher from Northampton, Massachusetts. She has authored two books of poetry: Blue Flame (Carnegie Mellon), and Goat in the Snow (Birds, LLC). and the chapbooks How (Octopus Books), and What Happened to Limbo (Pilot Books). She was shortlisted for The Believer Poetry award.

== Education ==
She received her MFA in Poetry at University of Iowa and her BA in Contemporary Images at University of Massachusetts, Amherst.

== Career ==
She has taught poetry at Columbia University, New York, New York. Pettit is an editor for Factory Hollow Press, notnostrums, and was publisher of the literary journal jubilat. Goat in the Snow was her first full-length collection of poetry and came out in early 2012. Her second volume of poems, Blue Flame, appeared in 2019 from Carnegie Mellon University Press. Her work has been included in Huffington Post, Academy of American Poets, and Vinyl Poetry. She has previously taught and/or lectured at Flying Object, University of Iowa, University of Massachusetts, and Elms College.

== Works and publications ==
- Blue Flame (Carnegie Mellon 2019)
- How (Octopus Books)
- What Happened to Limbo (Pilot Books)
- Goat in the Snow (Birds, LLC 2012)
