= A Thousand Times You Lose Your Treasure =

2021 poetry collection by Hoa Nguyen

- Author: Hoa Nguyen
- Publisher: Wave Books
- Publication date: April 6, 2021
- Pages: 144
- ISBN: 978-1950268184
- Preceded by: Violet Energy Ingots

A Thousand Times You Lose Your Treasure is a 2021 poetry collection by Hoa Nguyen. Her fifth poetry collection, it was a finalist for the 2021 National Book Award for Poetry.

== Contents and background ==
The book's poems constitute a biography of Nguyen's mother, Nguyễn Anh Diệp, who was a motorist in a stunt troupe composed entirely of women during the fifties and sixties. The book also involves Nguyen's reckoning with her motherland as a Vietnamese American and her understanding of its history through the perspective of her mother. In Fence, Nguyen said she wanted the book to have some substantive relationship to archive, both what has been documented and what has been lost, forgotten; she specifically drew heavily upon Saidiya Hartman's scholarship during its writing.

== Critical reception ==
The book won the Canada Book Award and was a finalist for the 2022 Kingsley Tufts Poetry Award.

In a starred review, Publishers Weekly called the book "ambitious" and lauded Nguyen's use of language in order to simultaneously communicate a biography of her mother and make a broader argument about diaspora.

Critics observed Nguyen's approach to writing about her mother and motherland as a simultaneous act. Chicago Review observed: "In Nguyen's new volume ... war and motherhood collide again, rippling across each other with startling effects that confirm an ongoing determination to register the back-and-forth diffraction of the political and the domestic." The Poetry Foundation said that Nguyen's rendering of her mother's biography was "brilliant, adventurous, and singular" and especially appreciated how "she refuses cartographies laid out by men, by nation-states, by form, by colonizer, and even by the fatalistic dynamics between mother and child." diaCRITICS argued that the poetry collection bore similarities to Dictee by Theresa Hak Kyung Cha and remarked that readers would be nourished "with tales of Diệp’s daring as a young woman and flying motorcycle artist before having left Vietnam." Poetry Daily analyzed Nguyen's use of the lyric in order to convey her mother's biography, stating that Nguyen "fundamentally understands the power in the materiality of language."
