= Mel Weisburd =

American poet and environmental activist

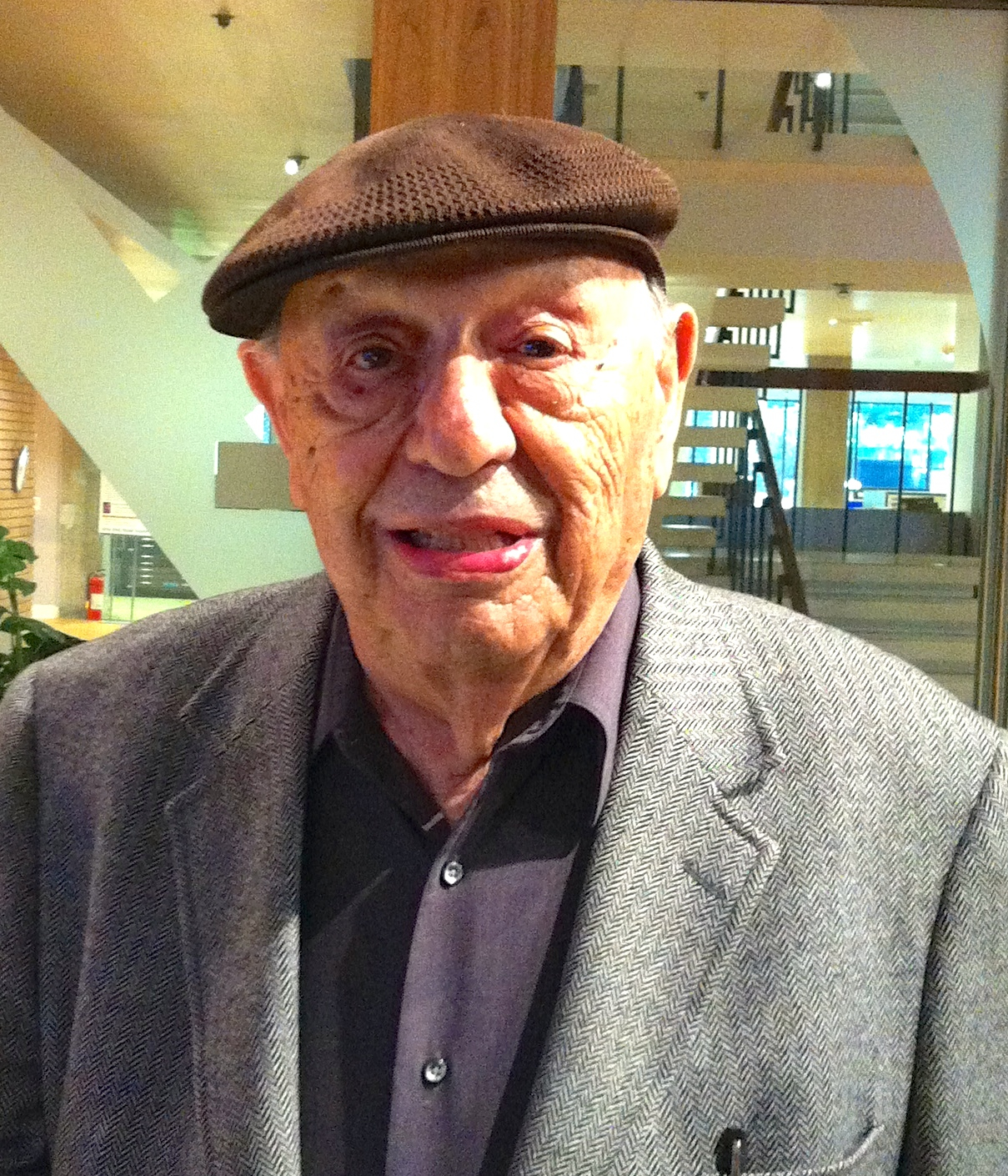
Mel Weisburd

Mel Weisburd (1927–2015) was an American writer and air pollution control pioneer whose work began bridging the divide between science and the humanities. He was known to "have a pioneering role in environmental law enforcement, health effects research and education."

== Career ==
Weisburd took an M.A. in English at UCLA in 1950, going on to study with Thomas McGrath at Los Angeles State College after that (today, LASC is known as California State University, Los Angeles). There he was editor of the student literary journal, Statement.

In 1955, Weisburd co-founded and was editor of the Los Angeles-based literary journal Coastlines with the poet Gene Frumkin. He and Frumkin, among many other Los Angeles poets, were members of the "Marsh Street Irregulars," a group that met regularly at the home of poet Thomas McGrath, around whom a good portion of the Los Angeles poetry scene orbited at that time.

He was anthologized in Walter Lowenfels's 1964 collection Poets of Today, and published poems in The California Quarterly, Midwest, Poet Lore, Transatlantic Review, Epos, and other venues. He is widely known for his article from Coastlines on his experience as an early lysergic acid diethylamide (LSD) test subject; that work was reprinted in Best Articles and Stories in 1958.

Beginning in the 1970s, Weisburd founded and was president of Pacific Environmental Services, Inc., an environmental engineering firm.
