= Flying Object =

Coordinates: 42°20′34″N 72°35′45″W

Flying Object Center for Independent Publishing, Art, & the Book is a nonprofit community and literary arts center based in Hadley, Massachusetts. It was established in October, 2010, as a bookstore, gallery, and letterpress, and has since incorporated as a nonprofit.

In addition to publishing original letterpressed works such as artists' books, chapbooks, and record jackets, the organization hosts several independent publishers that share its space and resources. Since opening, over 175 poets, writers, and musicians have performed there, including Eugene Ostashevsky, Dara Wier, James Tate, Susan Bernofsky, Christian Hawkey, Uljana Wolf, DA Powell, Kim Gordon, Aaron Kunin, Alex Phillips, Polina Barskova, & Thurston Moore.
