= Stephanie Young (poet) =

American poet, activist, and scholar

Stephanie Young is an American poet, activist, and scholar. She lives in Oakland, California.

== Career ==
Young teaches at Mills College, where she is also the Director of Strategic Initiatives and Programs. At Mills College, Young participated as labor organizer in a successful adjunct unionization campaign. Institutional politics in the university have been a theme in her work.

Her collections of poetry include Telling the Future Off (2005), Picture Palace (2008), and Ursula or University (2013). She edited the anthology Bay Poetics (2006) and co-edited, along with poet Juliana Spahr, the book A Megaphone: Some Enactments, Some Numbers, and Some Essays about the Continued Usefulness of Crotchless-pants-and-a-machine-gun Feminism (2012), a collection of “enactments” investigating politics, feminism, and collaborative poetry practice that the pair performed between 2005 and 2007. Young's poetry and prose have been published in a variety of sites, including: The Poetry Foundation, The Chronicle of Higher Education, and Los Angeles Review of Books. Young was a founding editor of the online anthology/“museum” of Oakland, Deep Oakland . She was a board member at Small Press Traffic, where she curated the Poets Theater festival from 2005 to 2008.

Young's work is noted for being cross-genre and hybrid, integrating text, performance, new media, archival research, and activism. According to T.C. Marshall, Young's poetry “works with feeling, fact, and militant action and reflection.”

Young belonged to the KRUPSKAYA/Krupskaya Books editorial collective serving as an editor between 2013 and 2015.

== Bibliography ==
=== Poetry ===
- Telling the Future Off (2005)
- Picture Palace (2008)
- Ursula or University (2013)
- Pet Sounds (2019)

=== Editor ===
- A Megaphone: Some Enactments, Some Numbers, and Some Essays about the Continued Usefulness of Crotchless-pants-and-a-machine-gun Feminism. Co-editor with Julian Spahr (2012)
- Bay Poetics. Editor (2006)

=== Selected essays ===
- The Program Era and the Mainly White Room. Co-authored with Juliana Spahr. (2015)
- Business Feminism. (2017)
- The Paradox of Protecting Students. Co-authored with Juliana Spahr. (2018)
