= Skanky Possum =

Defunct poetry journal and imprint in Austin, Texas, USA

Skanky Possum was a twice-a-year poetry journal and small book-publishing imprint begun in Austin, Texas that operated between 1998 and 2012.

== History and profile ==
Skanky Possum was first published in Fall 1998. Curated by Hoa Nguyen and her husband, Dale Smith, the imprint published American poetry. Discussing small poetry journals, Linh Dinh observes, "Although most of these are ephemeral, appearing for only a few issues, with tiny circulations, their existence invigorates American literature."

This 11 issue staple-bound magazine published four poems selected by Robert Creeley for the 2002 The Best American Poetry series. "In poetry circles, their magazine is highly regarded," Crispin Jessa wrote in Bookslut. Poems by Amiri Baraka, Clayton Eshleman, Robert Kelly, Linh Dinh, Eileen Myles, Kenward Elmslie, Alice Notley, Anselm Hollo and Diane di Prima were published.

The annual circulation of the magazine was 300 to 500 copies. Smith and Nguyen also published several poetry books under the Skanky Possum imprint including titles by Tom Clark, Kristin Prevallet and Sotere Torregian.

Skanky Possum ceased publication in 2012.
