= Ongoingness =

2015 book by Sarah Manguso

Ongoingness: The End of a Diary
- First edition
- Author: Sarah Manguso
- Language: English
- Subject: Reflection on journaling
- Genre: Memoir
- Published: 2015
- Publisher: Graywolf Press
- Publication date: March 3, 2015
- Publication place: United States
- Pages: 144
- ISBN: 978-1-55597-703-0

Ongoingness: The End of a Diary is a 2015 book by Sarah Manguso. Manguso kept a journal for 25 years, producing an 800,000-word-long document. In Ongoingness, she explores and reflects upon her reasons and motivations for journaling – her obsessive need to document every incident in her life because she was afraid she would forget the details later, and using journaling as a coping mechanism for dealing with low-level anxiety. She also explores her change in writing style with time – her earlier entries were detailed; now they are brief; while she used to write in the past tense, she now uses the present tense.
