= B O D Y =

Online literary magazine

- Categories: Literary Magazine
- Founder: Christopher Crawford; Joshua Mensch; Stephan Delbos
- Founded: 2012
- Based in: Prague
- Language: English
- Website: B O D Y

B O D Y is an international online literary magazine publishing new work three times a year. B O D Y publishes short stories, poetry, creative nonfiction, reviews, translations, essays, artworks, photography, and has been noted for its elegant, intuitive design and for its editorial vision. B O D Y was founded in Prague by Christopher Crawford, Joshua Mensch, and Stephan Delbos in 2012. B O D Y was at the very forefront of the digital revolution of literary magazines and fostered the growing familiarity between US poets and their British counterparts at that time through providing an online platform which features the work of both. It is also noted for regularly publishing Central and Eastern European literature in translation. B O D Y is published in English language.

== Notable contributors ==
- Richard Siken
- Niall Campbell
- Ilya Kaminsky
- Jack Underwood
- John Glenday
- Dara Wier
- Francesca Bell
- Luke Kennard
- Geoffrey Nutter
- Jeffrey McDaniel
- Sam Riviere
- Miklos Radnoti
- Petr Hruška
- Jane Hirshfield
- Jill McDonough
- Daniil Kharms
- Anna Akhmatova
- Laura Kasischke
- Bruce Bond
- Lucy Alibar
- Robert Archambeau
- Eugenio Montale
- Chard deNiord
- Rolf Dieter Brinkmann
- Ernest Hilbert
- Justin Quinn
- David Morley
- Alison Brackenbury
- Matthew Olzmann

== Masthead ==
- Christopher Crawford - Founding Editor
- Joshua Mensch - Founding Editor
- Stephan Delbos - Founding Editor
- Michael Stein - Fiction in Translation Editor
- Jan Zikmund - Czech Editor
- Jessica Mensch - Art Editor

== See also ==
- List of literary magazines
