= Fuck You, Aloha, I Love You =

Fuck You, Aloha, I Love You is a collection of poems by Juliana Spahr. First published by Wesleyan University Press in 2001.
