= Bill Kushner =

American poet

William Kushner (1931 in Bronx, New York – August 15, 2015 in New York City, New York) was an American poet associated with the New York School. He is the author of the following books of verse; Night Fishing (1980), Head (1986), Love Uncut (1990), He Dreams of Waters (2000), That April (2000), In Sunsetland with You (2007), Walking After Midnight (2011 Spuyten Duyvil) and several other volumes. His poem "Great" was included in Best American Poetry 2002. Jeffrey Cyphers Wright said in writing on his collection "Walking After Midnight" in the Brooklyn Rail, " This unblinking collection is a tour of whistle stops under a strobe light".

Kushner died in August 2015 at the age of 84.
