= Jena Osman =

American poet

- Born: Philadelphia, Pennsylvania, U.S.
- Education: Brown University; University at Buffalo
- Occupations: Poet; Editor
- Writing career
- Genre: Poetry

Jena Osman is an American poet and editor, who graduated from Brown University, and the State University of New York at Buffalo, with a Ph.D. She teaches in the MFA Creative Writing program at Temple University.

== Biography ==
Osman's work has appeared in American Letters & Commentary, Conjunctions, Hambone, Verse, and XCP: Cross-Cultural Poetics.

She has been a writing fellow at the MacDowell Colony, the Blue Mountain Center, the Djerassi Foundation, and Chateau de la Napoule. She inspired the start of Hyphen magazine.

In her ongoing project, "Court Reports," Osman worked directly from court records, judicial opinions bearing the stamp and influence of Charles Reznikoff.

== Career ==
With Juliana Spahr, Osman founded and edited the literary magazine Chain from 1994-2005. Chain highlighted often-experimental work by communities that Osman and Spahr felt were underrepresented in other literary journals of the time. Osman credits her time working on Chain as “central to [her] development as a poet.”

Osman’s The Network (Fence Books, 2010) was selected as a 2009 National Poetry Series Winner.

2014’s Corporate Relations (Burning Deck Press) was inspired by the Supreme Court’s 2010 Citizens United v. FEC ruling and is structured around twelve Supreme Court cases that similarly granted constitutional rights to large corporations. The book served as the inspiration for composer Ted Hearne’s choral piece, “Sound From the Bench.”

Osman’s sixth book Motion Studies (Ugly Duckling Presse, 2019), consists of three essay-poems connecting meditations on 19th-century science to commentary on the power of contemporary technology. Motion Studies was selected as a 2020 Firecracker Award winner by the Community of Literary Magazines and Presses (CLMP).

In 2023, Osman released A Very Large Array: Selected Poems (DABA), a collection of work published in various out-of-print books and journals spanning 30+ years of her career.

== Awards ==
- 2020 CLMP Firecracker Award
- 2009 National Poetry Series
- 2006 Pew Fellowships
- 1998 Barnard Women Poets Prize
- National Endowment for the Arts grant
- the New York Foundation for the Arts grant
- The Pennsylvania Council on the Arts grant
- Fund for Poetry grant

== Works ==
- A Very Large Array: Selected Poems. DABA. 2023. ISBN 9781734681796.
- Motion Studies. Ugly Duckling Presse. 2019. ISBN 978-1-946433-23-7.
- Corporate Relations. Burning Deck Press. 2014. ISBN 9781936194179.
- The Network. Fence Books. 2010. ISBN 978-1-934200-40-7.
- "flag of my disposition"; "hurrah for positive science", 5 Trope
- "THE PERIODIC TABLE AS ASSEMBLED BY DR. ZHIVAGO, OCULIST", Zhivago, 2002-3
- An Essay in Asterisks. Roof Books. 2004. ISBN 978-1-931824-10-1.
- The Character. Beacon Press. 1999. ISBN 978-0-8070-6848-9.
- Jury. Meow Press. 1996.
- Amblyopia. Avenue B. 1993. ISBN 978-0-939691-09-8.
- Twelve Parts of Her. Burning Deck Press. 1989. ISBN 978-1-886224-48-3.

=== Anthologies ===
- The Best American Poetry 2002, (editor: Robert Creeley)
