= Jubilat =

jubilat
- Discipline: literary journal
- Language: English

Publication details
- History: 2000 to 2021
- Publisher: Dara Wier with assistance from University of Massachusetts Amherst (United States)
- Frequency: Biannual

Standard abbreviations
- ISO 4: Jubilat

Indexing
- ISSN: 1529-0999

Links
- Journal homepage

jubilat WAS a widely distributed, highly acclaimed American poetry and prose journal headquartered at the University of Massachusetts Amherst. Published from 2000 through 2021, it was founded by Rob Casper, Christian Hawkey, Michael Teig and Kelly LeFave. From its first issue onward, jubilat has aimed to publish what's most alive in contemporary American poetry, and to place it alongside selections of reprints, found pieces, prose of various kinds, art, and interviews with poets and other artists.

== National acclaim and honors ==
Work from recent issues of jubilat have been chosen for The Best American Poetry 2017, 2009, 2005, 2001; the Pushcart Prize: Best of the Small Presses 2003 and 2004; and several times for reprint in Harper's Magazine. jubilat has also been featured in Poets & Writers, The Chronicle of Higher Education, and on National Public Radio's All Things Considered, and was shown in the New York Public Library's 2002 exhibit "New American Literary Magazines". jubilat participates in the Academy of American Poets' National Poetry Month initiative as Media Sponsors, and in the Council of Literary Magazines and Presses' national Lit Mag and Small Press Fairs.

== Associated events ==
Since 2001, jubilat has co-sponsored the jubilat/Jones Reading Series at the Jones Library in Amherst, Massachusetts. Readers in that series have included James Tate, Matthea Harvey, Evie Shockley, Dara Wier, Peter Richards, Matthew Zapruder, D.A. Powell, Brenda Shaughnessy, Jorie Graham, Mark Levine, Caroline Knox, Brian Henry, Tomaz Salamun, Matthew Rohrer, Ben Doyle, Emily Wilson, Frank Bidart, Saskia Hamilton, Rachel Zucker, Mark Wunderlich, David Rivard, Fanny Howe, Arielle Greenberg, Sarah Manguso, C.D. Wright, Prageeta Sharma, Michael Earl Craig, Chelsey Minnis, Catherine Wagner, James Haug, Michael Gizzi, Afaa Michael Weaver, Elizabeth Willis, Henri Cole, Anselm Berrigan, Ann Lauterbach, William Corbett, Forrest Gander, Lisa Jarnot, Srikanth Reddy, Anthony McCann, Brian Blanchfield, Katy Lederer, Travis Nichols, Cole Swenson, Gillian Conoley, Maggie Nelson, Dean Young, Tony Hoagland, Mary Jo Salter, Rebecca Wolff, Suzanne Buffam, Dan Chaisson, Daisy Fried, Mong-Lan, Keith Waldrop, Rosemary Waldrop, Major Jackson, Lesle Lewis, Cathy Park Hong, D. Nurkse, Dorothea Lasky, Laura Solomon, Mark Leidner, Michael Snediker, John Emil Vincent, Kimiko Hahn, Zach Schomberg, Emily Kendal Frey, Timothy Donnelly, Natalie Lyalin, Jordan Stempleman, Michelle Taransky, Dobby Gibson, Brett Ralph, Jenny Kronovet, Caryl Pagel, Jericho Brown, C.A. Conrad, David Berman, David Brinks, Steve Healey, Lucy Ives, John Beer, Ish Klein, Ben Lerner, Matvei Yankelvich, Julie Carr, Ryan Murphy, Eugene Ostashevsky, Polina Barskova, Alan Felsenthal, Rachel B. Glaser, Joshua Beckman, Jeffrey Yang, Camille Rankine, Tyehimba Jess.

== Funding ==
jubilat is funded by private donors, fund-raising efforts, and in part by support from Massachusetts Cultural Council, University of Massachusetts Amherst Arts Council, National Endowment for the Arts and the University of Massachusetts Amherst

== Masthead ==
Executive Editor, Dara Wier

Editors, Kevin González, Caryl Pagel, Emily Pettit

Special Issues Editor, Arda Collins

Found Content Editor, Halie Theoharides

Assistant Editor, John Goodhue

Special Features Editor, Amanda Dahill-Moore

Web Editor, Lauren Haldeman

Design, Mary Austin Speaker

Managing Editor, Halie Theoharides

Assistant Managing Editor, Caroline Rayner

Editorial Assistants, Emilie Menzel, Stacey Cusson

Readers, John Goodhue, Stevie Belchak, Hannah Bishop, Brittany Capps, Zachery Elbourne, Emily Hunerwadel, Allison Ice, Michaela Loewer, Jamie Thomson

Social Media Editors, Zachery Elbourne, Emily Hunerwadel

Founding Publisher, Robert N. Casper

Founding Editors, Christian Hawkey, Kelly LeFave & Michael Teig

Editors-at-Large, Jen Bervin, Terrance Hayes, Cathy Park Hong, Evie Shockley

Contributing Editors, Jessica Fjeld, Peter Gizzi, Kimiko Hahn, Matthea Harvey, Eric Keenaghan, Andrew Kenower, Brett Fletch Lauer, Jeffrey Lependorf
