= Juliana Spahr =

American poet, critic, and editor (born 1966)

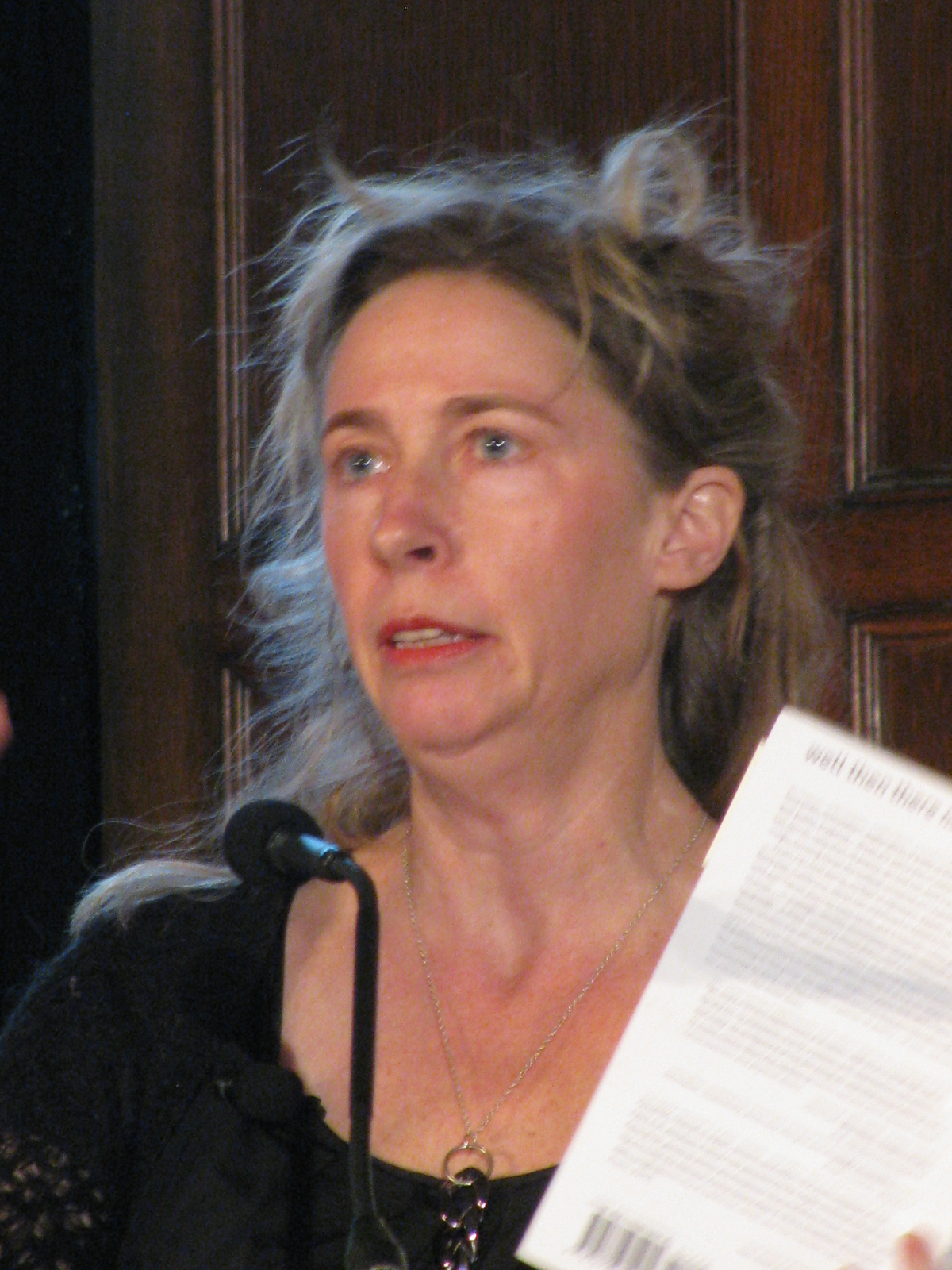
- Born: 1966 (age 59–60); Chillicothe, Ohio, US
- Education: Bard College (B.A.); University at Buffalo (PhD)
- Writing career
- Genre: Poetry
- Notable awards: Pulitzer Prize for Poetry

Juliana Spahr (born 1966) is an American poet, critic, and editor. She is the recipient of the 2009 Hardison Poetry Prize awarded by the Folger Shakespeare Library to honor a U.S. poet whose art and teaching demonstrate great imagination and daring and the 2026 winner of the Pulitzer Prize for Poetry.

== Early life and education ==
Born and raised in Chillicothe, Ohio, Spahr received her BA from Bard College and her PhD from the University at Buffalo, The State University of New York in English.

== Career ==
She has taught at Siena College (1996–7), the University of Hawaiʻi at Mānoa (1997–2003), and Mills College (2003–). With Jena Osman, she edited the arts journal Chain from 1993 to 2003. In 2012, Spahr co-edited A Megaphone: Some Enactments, Some Numbers, and Some Essays about the Continued Usefulness of Crotchless-pants-and-a-machine-gun Feminism with Mills colleague and fellow-poet Stephanie Young.

Both Spahr's critical and scholarly studies, i.e., Everybody’s Autonomy: Connective Reading and Collective Identity (2001), and her poetry have shown Spahr's commitment to fostering a "value of reading" as a communal, democratic, open process. Her work therefore "distinguishes itself because she writes poems for which her critical work calls." In addition to teaching and writing poetry, Spahr is also an active editor.

== Activism ==
Spahr's participation in the 2011 Occupy Movement is chronicled in her 2015 book That Winter The Wolf Came. According to Spahr, she spent time in the encampments and participated in protests, although she and her son "never spent the night." Her work examines social issues, including the repercussions of the BP oil spill, the global impact of September 11 attacks, capitalism, and climate change. She uses poetry as a mechanism to provide cultural recognition and representation to social movements and political actions.

Following the Occupy Movement, the police shootings of Oscar Grant, Eric Garner, and Mike Brown, and the 2009 California college tuition hike protests, Spahr founded the publishing project Commune Editions, along with Jasper Bernes and Joshua Clover. The project was founded with the intention to publish poetry as a companion to political action.

== Awards and honors ==
Spahr received the National Poetry Series Award for her first collection of poetry, Response (1996).

She is the recipient of the 2009 Hardison Poetry Prize awarded by the Folger Shakespeare Library to honor a U.S. poet whose art and teaching demonstrate great imagination and daring.

== Bibliography ==
=== Poetry ===
- Nuclear (Leave Books, 1994) – full text
- Response (Sun & Moon Press, 1996) – full text
- Spiderwasp or Literary Criticism (Explosive Books, 1998)
- Fuck You-Aloha-I Love You (Wesleyan University Press, 2001)
- Things of Each Possible Relation Hashing Against One Another (Palm Press, 2003)ISBN 0-9743181-0-8
- This Connection of Everyone With Lungs (University of California Press, 2005)
- Well Then There Now (Black Sparrow Press, 2011) ISBN 978-1-57423-217-2
- That Winter The Wolf Came (Commune Editions, 2015)
- Ars Poeticas (Wesleyan University Press, 2025) ISBN 978-0-8195-0152-3

=== Fiction ===
- An Army of Lovers with David Buuck, ISBN 9780872866294
- The Transformation (Berkeley, California: Atelos Press, 2007)

=== Criticism ===
- Everybody's Autonomy: Connective Reading and Collective Identity (University of Alabama Press, 2001)
- Du Bois's Telegram: Literary Resistance and State Containment (Harvard University Press, 2018)

=== Editor ===
- Writing from the New Coast: Technique (essay collection) Co-editor with Peter Gizzi. (Stockbridge: O-blek Editions, 1993)
- A Poetics of Criticism (essay collection) Co-editor with Mark Wallace, Kristin Prevallet, and Pam Rehm. (Buffalo: Leave Books, 1993)
- Chain [co-edited with Jena Osman ], since 1994 full text
- American Women Poets in the 21st Century: Where Lyric Meets Language [co-edited with Claudia Rankine ], (Wesleyan University Press, 2002)
- Poetry and Pedagogy: the Challenge of the Contemporary [co-edited with Joan Retallack ], (Palgrave, 2006)
- A Megaphone: Some Enactments, Some Numbers, and Some Essays about the Continued Usefulness of Crotchless-pants-and-a-machine-gun Feminism [co-edited with Stephanie Young], (ChainLinks, 2011)
