= Chicago Review =

- Discipline: Literary magazine
- Language: English
- Edited by: James Garwood-Cole

Publication details
- History: 1946 to present
- Publisher: University of Chicago (United States)
- Frequency: Quarterly

Standard abbreviations
- ISO 4: Chic. Rev.

Indexing
- ISSN: 0009-3696
- JSTOR: 00093696

Links
- Journal homepage

Chicago Review is a graduate student-run literary magazine founded in 1946 and published quarterly in the Humanities Division at the University of Chicago. The magazine features contemporary poetry, fiction, and criticism, often publishing works in translation and special features in double issues.

Three stories published in Chicago Review have won the O. Henry Award. Work that first appeared in Chicago Review has also been reprinted in The Best American Poetry 2002, The Best American Poetry 2004, and The Best American Short Stories 2003.

== Early history ==
Chicago Review was founded in 1946 by two University of Chicago graduate students, James Radcliffe Squires and Carrolyn Dillard, in response to what they described as "an exaggerated utilitarianism on the college." They aimed to present a "contemporary standard of good writing" and demanded "that the writers do better than they thought they could." Chicago Review exclusively published work by students and faculty members of the university until the Fall/Winter issue of 1953, when F.N. "Chip" Karmtaz assumed editorship of the magazine.

=== Beat poetry censorship controversy ===
Before censorship by the university administration, Chicago Review was an early and leading promoter of the Beat Movement in American literature. In the autumn of 1958, it published an excerpt from Burroughs' Naked Lunch, which was judged obscene by the Chicago Daily News and sparked public outcry; this episode led to the censorship of the following issue, to which the editors responded by resigning and starting a new magazine in which to freely publish Beat fiction.

Chicago Review became the subject of further controversy in 1959, when the University of Chicago prohibited editor Irving Rosenthal from publishing a winter issue that was to include Jack Kerouac's Sebastian Midnite, a thirty-page excerpt from William S. Burroughs's Naked Lunch and a thirty-page work by Edward Dahlberg. The concern of the university was that the work might be deemed obscene. All but one editor quit the paper. Rosenthal, Ginsberg, John Fles, and others responded by founding Big Table; its first issue included ten chapters of Naked Lunch.

In the context of the ongoing nationwide conflict between traditional versus Beat fiction, the impact of the creation of Big Table was such that, as Thomas Pynchon recalled "'what happened at Chicago' became shorthand for some unimaginable subversive threat" among the literature college students at Cornell University

== Special features ==
Chicago Review often publishes special features within its issues. In the summer of 1958, it published Volume 12, Number 3 (Issue 12:3) with a special section titled "On Zen" that featured contributions from writers such as Alan Watts and Jack Kerouac. Through this issue, Chicago Review played a significant role in introducing Zen to the American public.

Most of the magazine's special features are included in double issues, the first of which was Issue 17:2/3 in 1964. Featuring new Chicago writing and art, the issue included work by poets such as Paul Carroll and Lucien Stryk. Later double issues, such as Issue 38:01/02, Contemporary Indian Literatures (1992) and Issue 46:3/4, New Polish Writing (2000), established Chicago Review as a premier literary magazine for publishing literary translations. Issue 60:3,The Infrarrealistas (2017), is the first collection of the Infrarealist poets’ Spanish writing in English translation.

Other notable features published by Chicago Review include a special section on Canadian poet Lisa Robertson in Issue 51:4/52:1, an A.R. Ammons feature in Issue 57:1/2, and a special issue on Ed Roberson and Chicago Modernists, Issue 59:4/60:1.

Chicago Review occasionally also publishes triple issues, such as Issue 50:2/3/4, which includes a centenary portfolio on Louis Zukofsky, and Issue 49:3/4 & 50:1, which contains a special section on poet Edward Dorn.

== Notable contributors ==
Many well-known writers have been published in Chicago Review, both before and after they became famous. Notably, Philip Roth and Susan Sontag's work appeared in print for the first time in Chicago Review while they were both students at the University of Chicago.

Other contributors include Henry Miller, Lawrence Ferlinghetti, Jack Kerouac, William S. Burroughs, Allen Ginsberg, Tennessee Williams, William Carlos Williams, Anaïs Nin, Charles Simic, John Ashbery, James Tate, Charles Bukowski, Raymond Carver, Philip Levine, Edward Dorn, Anne Carson, Marianne Moore, E.E. Cummings, Robert Duncan, Helen DeWitt, Rae Armantrout, and Dimitris Lyacos.

== See also ==
- List of literary magazines
