= Hambone Award =

Annual award for pets

- Awarded for: Unusual injuries to pets
- Sponsored by: Veterinary Pet Insurance
- Date: September 2009; 17 years ago
- Country: United States
- Website: www.petinsurance.com/hamboneaward/

The Hambone Award is presented annually by the Veterinary Pet Insurance Company subsidiary of Nationwide Insurance to the family of the pet that wins a public vote determining whose injuries were caused by the most unusual circumstances.

== History ==
It is named for an unusual accident suffered by a client covered by a pet insurance policy, an unnamed dog who reportedly was trapped in a refrigerator for several hours and suffered a mild case of hypothermia while waiting for rescue, consuming the family's holiday ham during the process. The winner receives a bronze ham-shaped trophy, a gift card, and an award to be donated to an approved pet-related charity.

Voting is open for approximately one week. The first winner, Lulu, made a televised appearance on Rachael Ray.

Hambone Award winners
Year	Name	Animal	Injury
2009	Lulu	English bulldog	Over six months, ate 15 pacifiers, a bottle cap, and part of a basketball; discovered after owner noticed a pacifier went missing immediately after being dropped and licked.
2010	Ellie	Labrador Retriever	Ate beehive left by exterminators; owners noticed dog was vomiting "hundreds of bees".
2011	Harley	Pug	Ate rocks, causing bowel obstruction; owner was frightened by bowel movements that were composed mostly of rocks.
2012	Peanut	mixed Dachshund / Terrier	Sprayed by skunk and nearly suffocated after becoming trapped in loose dirt under owner's deck; deck was dismantled and owners retrieved dog after spotting one free paw.
2013	Winnie	mixed-breed dog	Ate 2 lb (0.91 kg) of frozen onion rings.
2014	Charlie	Labrador Retriever	Run over by farm equipment towed behind tractor, fracturing spine and damaging kidney, which had to be removed.
2015	Curtis	Boxer	Ate wooden barbecue skewer; removed nearly one year later, having been encapsulated in a baseball-sized foreign body granuloma.
2016	Kismet	Jack Russell Terrier	Stabbed by burglar during violent robbery.
2017	Rooster	mixed hound	Impaled by branch more than 1 ft (0.30 m) long while hiking with owner.
2018	Ziva and Zeus	German Shepherds	Escaped from yard and missing for three weeks after being trapped inside abandoned missile silo 200 yd (180 m) from owners' home.
2019	Minnow	Domestic shorthair	Indoor/outdoor cat; missing for three weeks; suffered starvation, dehydration, and a broken rib.
2020	Chopper	Boxer	Burst through a window while trying to greet a visitor, injuring paws and tendons.
2021	Bruin	German Shepherd	Broke leg and missing for four days after falling 400 ft (120 m) into a canyon.
2022	Rafa	Siberian cat mix	Developed severe hypothermia after being trapped in storm drain.
2023	Giles	Domestic shorthair	Although instructed to check for cat, inadvertently folded into sofa bed, requiring stitches.
2024	Luca	Shiloh shepherd	Pulled kitchen cabinet off tracks and ate garbage.
