= Camille Rankine =

American poet

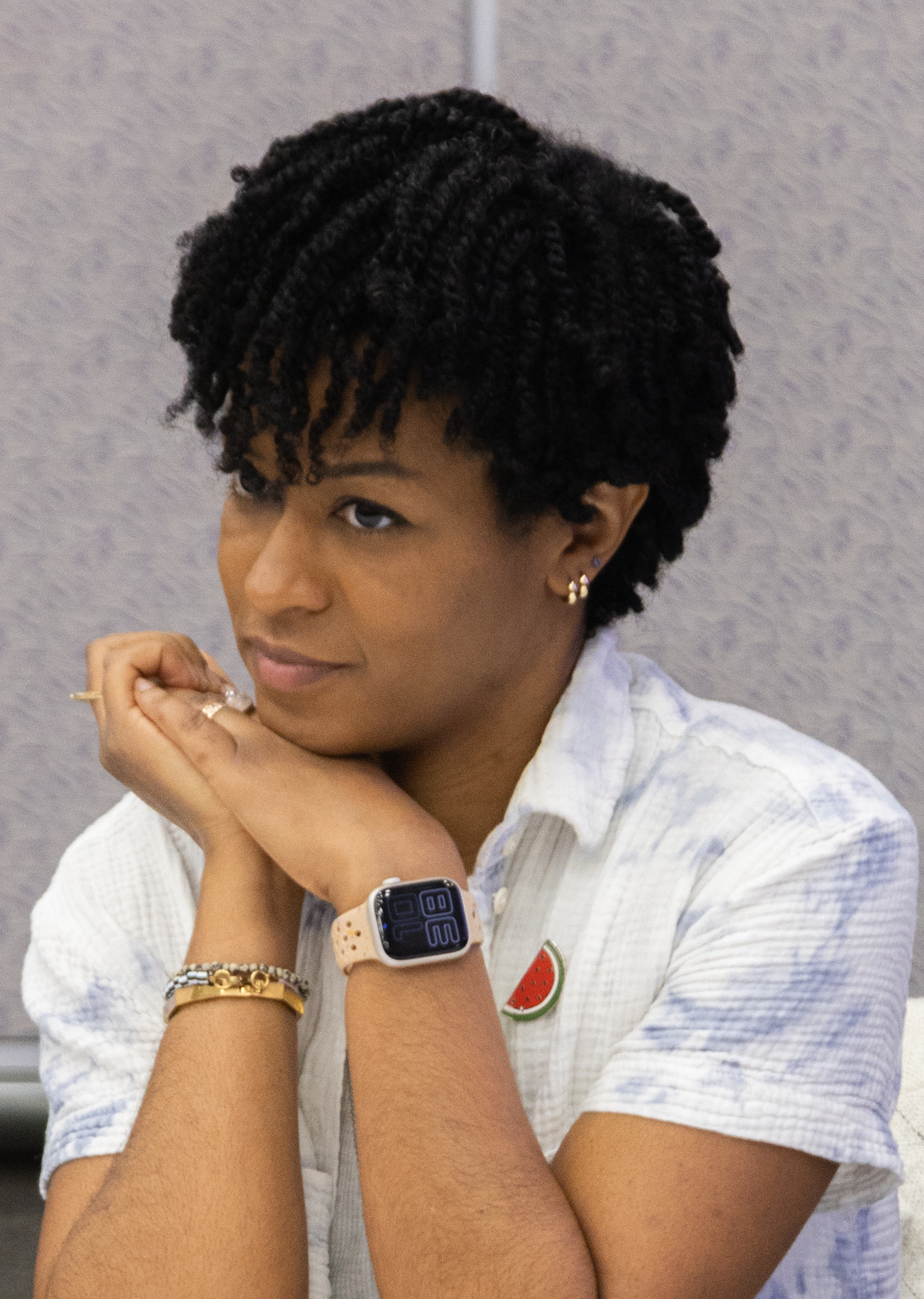
- Rankine at AWP 2025
- Born: Portland, Oregon, U.S.
- Education: Harvard University; Columbia University School of the Arts
- Occupation: Poet
- Writing career
- Genre: Poetry

Camille Rankine is an American poet. She was born and raised in Portland, Oregon, earned a BA at Harvard University and an MFA at Columbia University.

Rankine is the author of the chapbook, Slow Dance with Trip Wire, selected by Cornelius Eady for the Poetry Society of America's 2010 New York Chapbook Fellowship. Her debut full-length collection, Incorrect Merciful Impulses, was released by Copper Canyon Press in 2016.

She was formerly assistant director of the MFA Program in Creative Writing at Manhattanville College and lives in New York City.

Rankine has won literary prizes including the "Discovery"/Boston Review Poetry Prize, a MacDowell Colony fellowship, and an honorary Cave Canem Foundation fellowship.

== Bibliography ==
- Incorrect Merciful Impulses, Copper Canyon Press, 2016
- Slow Dance with Trip Wire, 2011 (chapbook)
- The Free World, Poetry Society of America
