= Dale Smith (poet) =

Canadian-American poet, editor, and critic (born 1967)

- Born: 1967 (age 58–59); Texas
- Education: University of Texas at Austin
- Occupations: Poet, professor

Dale Smith (born 1967) is a Canadian-American poet, editor, and critic. Smith was born and raised in Texas and studied poetry at New College of California in San Francisco. Having completed his PhD at the University of Texas in Austin, he and his wife, the poet Hoa Nguyen, now live in Toronto Ontario, Canada, where he is an assistant professor of English at Toronto Metropolitan University.

While in San Francisco, Smith was co-editor of Mike & Dale's Younger Poets. After moving to Austin in 1998, he and Hoa Nguyen started the small press publishing venture Skanky Possum. From November 2003 to October 2004, then from October 2007 to April 2009, Smith wrote a column for Bookslut. Smith's poetry and essays have appeared in The Best American Poetry 2002. In 2007, he wrote the introduction to Ed Dorn's Way More West (2007, Penguin). His book The Size of Paradise was longlisted for the 2025 Griffin Poetry Prize.

== Works ==
- American Rambler (Thorp Springs Press, 2000)
- The Flood & The Garden (First Intensity, 2002)
- Coo-coo Fourth July (Backwoods Broadsides, 2002)
- My Vote Counts (BlazeVOX Books, 2004)
- Notes No Answer (Habenicht Press, 2005)
- Black Stone (Effing, 2007)
- Susquehanna (Punch Press, 2008)
- Slow Poetry in America (Cuneiform, 2014)
- Poets Beyond the Barricade: Rhetoric, Citizenship, and Dissent after 1960 (University of Alabama Press, 2012)
- Sons (knife | fork | book, 2017)
- Flying Red Horse (Talonbooks, 2021)
- Blur (knife | fork | book, 2022)
- The Size of Paradise (knife | fork | book, 2024)
