= Hòa Nguyễn =

American poet (born 1967)

Hoa Nguyen
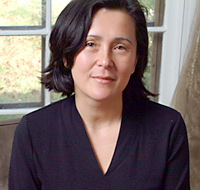
- Born: 1967 (age 58–59); Vĩnh Long, South Vietnam
- Spouse: Dale Smith

Academic background
- Education: University of Maryland, College Park (BS); New College of California (MFA)

Academic work
- Discipline: Poetry
- Institutions: Toronto Metropolitan University; Miami University; Bard College

Hoa Nguyen (born 1967) is an American poet and academic.

== Background ==
Born in Vĩnh Long, Nguyen is the daughter of a Vietnamese mother; her biological father, an American man, abandoned the family before Nguyen was born.

== Career ==
With her husband Dale Smith, Nguyen edited ten issues of Skanky Possum magazine, and under this imprint, published books and chapbooks by Kristin Prevallet, Tom Clark, Frank O'Hara, and others. Together they host a reading series presenting performances by Pierre Joris, Linh Dinh, Susan Briante, Joshua Marie Wilkinson, Kate Greenstreet, Laynie Browne, Anselm Berrigan, and others. Since 1998, she has led a popular virtual and in-person writing workshop focusing on the works of poets such as Alice Notley, Eileen Myles, Joanne Kyger, Philip Whalen, Charles Olson, Emily Dickinson, and Gertrude Stein. She currently teaches poetics at Toronto Metropolitan University, Miami University, and the Milton Avery Graduate School of the Arts at Bard College.

Her poems have been published in numerous journals and anthologies, including Days I Moved Through Ordinary Sound: The Teachers of WritersCorps in Poetry and Prose (City Lights, 2009), The Best of Fence (Fence Books, 2009), For the Time Being: A Bootstrap Anthology (Bootstrap Books, 2008), An Anthology of New (American) Poets (Talisman House, 1998), and in Black Dog, Black Night: Contemporary Vietnamese Poetry (Milkweed Editions, 2008). She is the author of Dark (1998), Parrot Drum (Leroy, 2000), Your Ancient See Through (Sub Press, 2002) and Red Juice (Effing, 2005), Hecate Lochia (Hot Whiskey Press, 2009), as well as many online publications. Nguyen is frequently asked to give readings, act as poet in residence, and lecture on poetry for organizations across the country.

Her collection, As Long as Trees Last, was published by Wave Books in September, 2012. Her most recent collection, Violet Energy Ingots, was published by Wave Books in 2016 and was shortlisted for the Griffin Poetry Prize in 2017.

Nguyen was a judge for the 2020 Griffin Poetry Prize.

== Personal life ==
Nguyen lives in Toronto, Ontario.

== Bibliography ==
=== Poetry ===
Collections

- Your Ancient See Through (Subpress, 2002)
- Hecate Lochia (Hot Whiskey Press, 2009)
- As Long As Trees Last (Wave Books, 2012)
- Red Juice: Poems 1998-2008 (Wave Books, 2014)
- Violet Energy Ingots (Wave Books, 2016) (Note: Shortlisted for the 2017 Griffin Poetry Prize.)
- A Thousand Times You Lose Your Treasure (Wave Books, 2021) (Note: Shortlisted for the 2021 National Book Award for Poetry. See "National Book Awards 2021 shortlists announced". Books+Publishing. 2021-10-06.)

Chapbooks and booklets

- Dark (Mike and Dale's Press, 1998)
- Let's Eat Red for Fun (Booglit, 2000)
- Parrot Drum (Leroy Press, 2000)
- Add Some Blue (Backwoods Broadsides Chaplet Series, 2004)
- Six Poems (Tolling Elves, 2005)
- Red Juice (Effing Press, 2005)
- Poems (Dos Press Chaps, 2007)
- What Have You (Longhouse Poetry, 2008)
- Kiss a Bomb Tattoo (Effing Press, 2009)
- Chinaberry (Fact-Simile, 2010)
- Late in the Month (Country Valley Press, 2011)
- Tells of the Crackling (Ugly Duckling Presse, 2015)
- Ask About Language As If It Forgets (knife fork book, 2019)

List of poems

Title	Year	First published	Reprinted/collected
"Fortune Cookie No Fortune"	2022	Nguyen, Hoa (October 2022). "Fortune cookie no fortune". Australian Book Review. 447: 35.	
