= Hambone (magazine) =

American literary magazine

- Editor: Nathaniel Mackey
- Categories: Poetry magazine
- Frequency: Irregular; annual
- First issue: Spring 1974
- Company: Private
- Country: United States
- Language: English

Hambone is a small literary magazine that has published major poets. The magazine is edited by poet Nathaniel Mackey.

Writing in The Nation magazine, John Palattella described Hambone as "an indispensable little magazine that for more than a quarter-century has featured work by everyone from Sun Ra, Robert Duncan, and Beverly Dahlen to Edward Kamau Brathwaite and Susan Howe."

== History and profile ==
The magazine's first issue was published in the spring of 1974 as a group effort by the Committee on Black Performing Arts at Stanford University. It was dormant for several years before Mackey revived it and changed its direction. The second issue appeared in the fall of 1982, with Mackey as sole editor and publisher. It included work by Sun Ra, fiction by Clarence Major, Wilson Harris and poems by Robert Duncan, Beverly Dahlen, Jay Wright, and Kamau Brathwaite. Since then it has appeared irregularly, at the rate of an issue every few years. In a 1991 interview, Mackey said, "Whether it will go on my whole life? I'm pretty sure that it won't. I don't know how much longer it will go on." Hambone 22 was published in 2019.
