= Peter Cooley =

American poet and professor

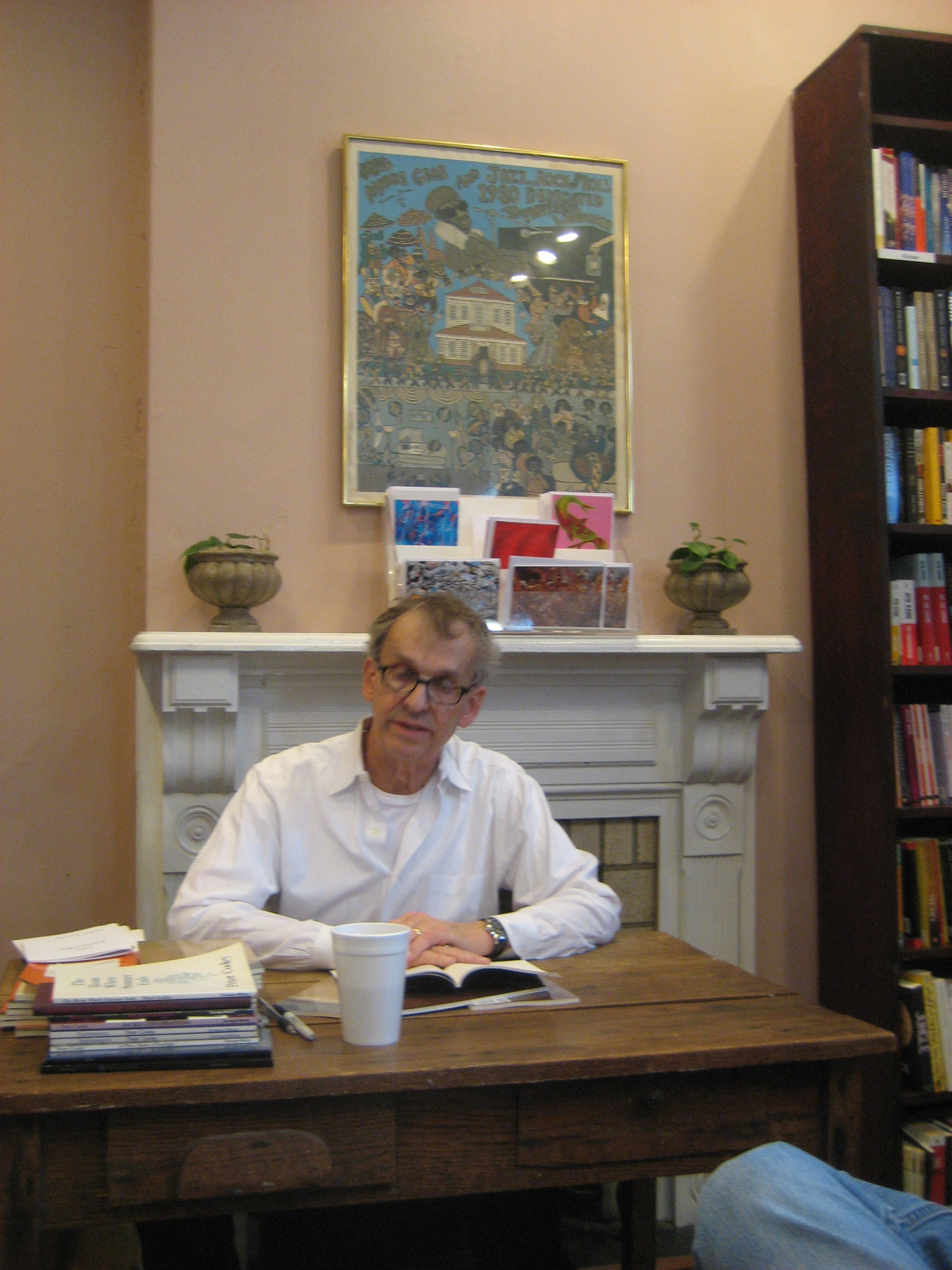
- Born: November 19, 1940 (age 85); Detroit, Michigan
- Occupations: Poet and Professor of English
- Writing career
- Period: 1960s-present
- Genre: Poetry
- Notable works: The Company of Strangers, 1975

Peter Cooley (born November 19, 1940) is an American poet and Professor of English in the Department of English at Tulane University. He also directs Tulane's Creative Writing Program. Born in Detroit, Michigan, he holds degrees from Shimer College, the University of Chicago and the University of Iowa. He is the father of poet Nicole Cooley.

== Career ==
Prior to joining Tulane, Cooley taught at the University of Wisconsin, Green Bay. He was the Robert Frost Fellow at the Bread Loaf Writers’ Conference in 1981.

== Poetry and awards ==
Cooley has published several books of poetry with the Carnegie Mellon University Press. He received the Inspirational Professor Award in 2001 and the Newcomb Professor of the Year Award in 2003. On August 14, 2015 he was named Louisiana's poet laureate.

== Bibliography ==
=== Poetry ===
Collections

- Cooley, Peter (1975). The company of strangers. University of Missouri Press.
- The Room Where Summer Ends (Pittsburgh: Carnegie Mellon University Press, 1979)
- Nightseasons (Pittsburgh: Carnegie Mellon University Press, 1983)
- The Van Gogh Notebook (Pittsburgh: Carnegie Mellon University Press, 1987)
- The Astonished Hours (Pittsburgh: Carnegie Mellon University Press, 1992)
- Sacred Conversations (Pittsburgh: Carnegie Mellon University Press, 1998)
- A Place Made of Starlight (Pittsburgh: Carnegie Mellon University Press, 2003)
- Divine Margins (Pittsburgh: Carnegie Mellon University Press, 2009)
- Night Bus to the Afterlife (Pittsburgh: Carnegie Mellon University Press, 2014)
- World Without Finishing (Pittsburgh: Carnegie Mellon University Press, 2018)
- The One Certain Thing (Pittsburgh: Carnegie Mellon University Press, 2021)

List of poems

Title	Year	First published	Reprinted/collected
Company of the motel room	2013	Cooley, Peter (November 4, 2013). "Company of the motel room". The New Yorker. Vol. 89, no. 35. p. 59.	
