= Hugh Seidman =

American poet (1940–2023)

Hugh Seidman (1940 – November 9, 2023) was an American poet.

== Life ==
Seidman was born in Brooklyn, NY in 1940. He was a graduate of Polytechnic Institute of New York University, where he studied under Louis Zukofsky. His first book of poetry was published when Stanley Kunitz selected it as the winner of the 1970 Yale Series of Younger Poets Competition.

Seidman taught writing at the University of Wisconsin, Yale University, Columbia University, the College of William and Mary, The New School.

His work appeared in The Brooklyn Rail, Harper's, The Paris Review, Virginia Quarterly Review.

Seidman died on November 9, 2023 after a long illness.

== Awards ==
- 2004 Green Rose Prize from New Issues Press (Western Michigan University) for SOMEBODY STAND UP AND SING
- 2003, 1990 New York Foundation for the Arts (NYFA) grant
- 1990 Camden Poetry Award (Walt Whitman Center for the Arts)
- 1985, 1972, 1970 National Endowment for the Arts fellowship
- 1971 New York State Creative Artists Public Service grant
- 1970 Yale Series of Younger Poets Competition

== Selected bibliography ==
- "Case History: Melancholia", Virginia Quarterly Review, Spring 2000
- "The Daily Racing Form", Virginia Quarterly Review, Spring 2000
- "On the Other Side of the Poem", Virginia Quarterly Review, Spring 2000
- Collecting Evidence. Yale University Press. 1970. ISBN 978-0-300-01322-1.
- People Live, They Have Lives. Oxford, OH: Miami University Press. 1992. ISBN 978-1-881163-03-9.
- Selected Poems: 1965-1995. Miami University Press. 1995. ISBN 978-1-881163-10-7.
- Throne, Falcon, Eye: Poems. Unmuzzled Ox Press. ISBN 978-0-934450-53-9.
- Blood Lord. Doubleday. 1974. ISBN 978-0-385-08172-6.
- 12 views of Freetown, 1 view of Bumbuna, (Half Moon Bay Press), 2003.
- Somebody stand up and sing. New Issues, Western Michigan University. 2005. ISBN 978-1-930974-53-1.

=== Anthologies ===
- Robert Creeley; David Lehman, eds. (2002). The Best American poetry. Charles Scribner's Sons. ISBN 978-0-7432-0385-2.
- Julia Kasdorf; Michael Tyrell, eds. (2007). "Yes, Yes, Like Us". Broken land: poems of Brooklyn. NYU Press. ISBN 978-0-8147-4803-9.

=== Criticism ===
- Seidman, Hugh (November 8, 1981). "POEMS AND EXCITEMENT". The New York Times.
