= T. Alan Broughton =

American poet

- Born: June 9, 1936; Bryn Mawr, Pennsylvania US
- Died: May 17, 2013 (aged 76); Shelburne, Vermont
- Occupation: Poet
- Spouse(s): Lenore Follansbee Broughton; Laurel Broughton

Thomas Alan Broughton (June 9, 1936 – May 17, 2013) was an American poet and amateur pianist.

Broughton was born in Bryn Mawr, Pennsylvania, the son of Thomas Robert Shannon Broughton, the noted Latin prosopographer, and Annie Leigh Hobson Broughton.

From 1966 until 2001 Broughton taught writing at the University of Vermont. He has attended Harvard University, Phillips Exeter Academy, and the Juilliard School of Music. He received degrees from Swarthmore College (B.A.) and the University of Washington (M.A., English literature).

Broughton received numerous awards and fellowships, including a Guggenheim for fiction in 1982, an NEH Fellowship, and was elected a Fellow of the Vermont Academy of Arts and Sciences in 2012. He served as a cultural representative in southeast Asia, Egypt, and Italy under the auspices of the United States Information Agency. Broughton was married first to Susan Elizabeth Becker, then to Lenore Follansbee Broughton and then to Laurel Broughton.

== Works ==
=== Poetry ===
- The Skin and All: Songs for the Cruelest Months, with images by Bill Davison (George Little Press 1972).
- In the Face of Descent (Carnegie Mellon University Press 1975), ISBN 0-915604-02-7.
- The Man on the Moon (Barlenmir House 1979).
- The Others We Are (Juniper Press 1979).
- Far From Home (Carnegie Mellon University Press 1979), ISBN 0-915604-25-6.
- Dreams Before Sleep (Carnegie Mellon University Press 1982), ISBN 0-915604-69-8
- The Jesse Tree (Juniper Press 1988)
- Preparing to Be Happy (Carnegie Mellon University Press 1988).
- In the Country of Elegies (Carnegie Mellon University Press 1995), ISBN 0-88748-198-1
- The Origin of Green (Carnegie Mellon University Press 2001), ISBN 0-88748-338-0.
- A World Remembered (Carnegie Mellon University Press 2010).

=== Fiction ===
- A Family Gathering, a novel (Dutton and Fawcett 1977).
- Winter Journey, a novel (Dutton and Fawcett 1980).
- The Horsemaster, a novel (Dutton 1981).
- Hob's Daughter, a novel (Morrow 1984).
- Suicidal Tendencies, short stories (University Press of Colorado 2003), ISBN 1-885635-05-2.

== Citations ==
- Rae Armantrout; John Ashbery; et al. (2002). The Best American Poetry 2002. Scribner Poetry. ISBN 0-7432-0386-0.

== Necrology ==
- "Professor Emeritus T. Alan Broughton Dies at Age 76" University of Vermont 05-21-2013
- "Obituary: T. ALAN BROUGHTON." The Burlington Free Press May 19, 2013
