= Gene Frumkin =

American poet and teacher

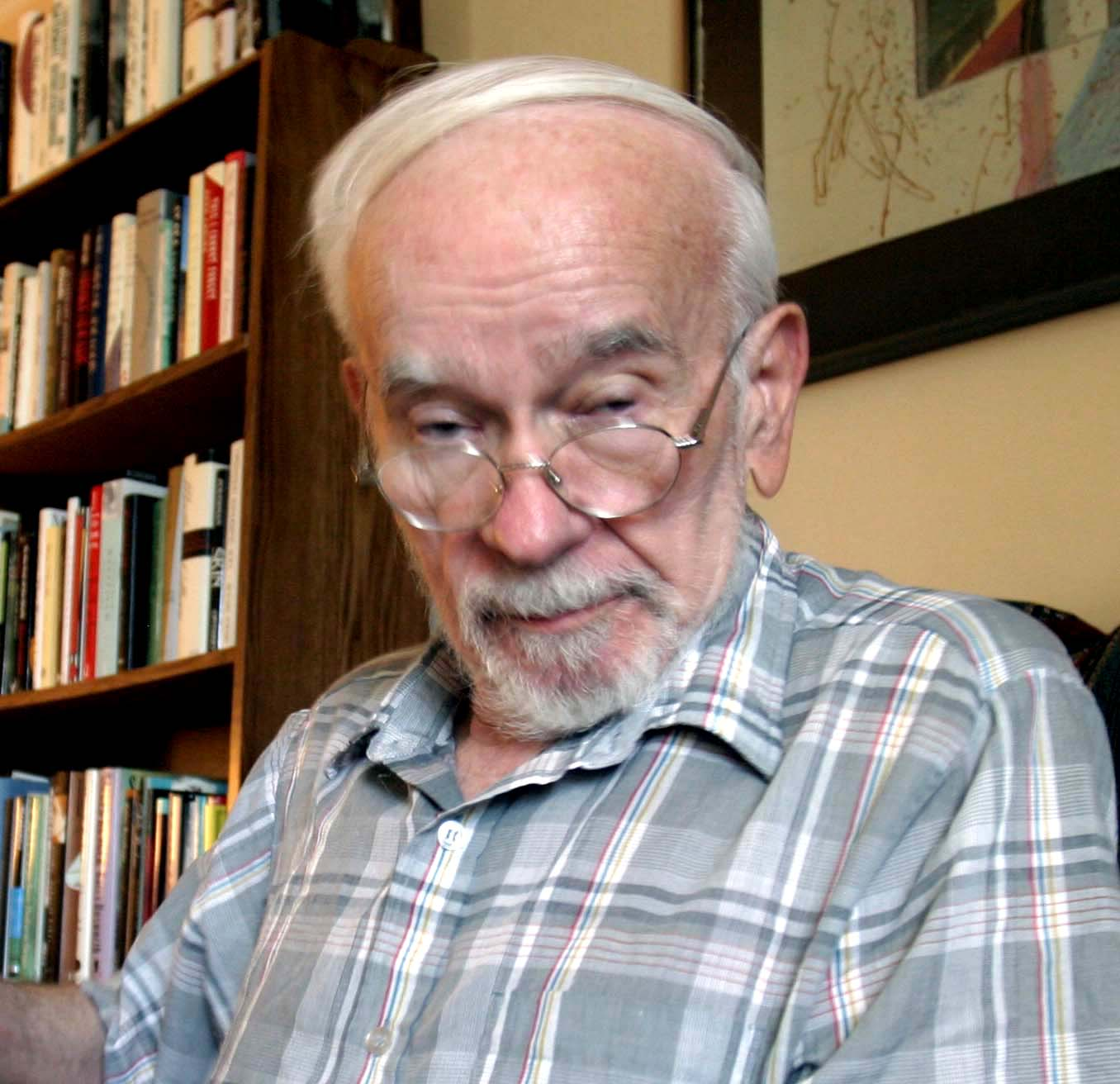
Gene Frumkin, photo by Gloria Graham taken during the video taping of Add-Verse, 2005

Gene Frumkin (1928–2007) was an American poet and teacher.

== Personal life ==
Frumkin was born in Harlem, New York and spent his first ten years in The Bronx. His parents moved to Los Angeles, California, in the late 1930s because of Eugene's asthma.

He earned a bachelor's degree in English in 1951 from UCLA, where he was editor of the UCLA Daily Bruin.

Frumkin died in Albuquerque on February 18, 2007. He was survived by a daughter, Celena Allison, and a son, Paul Frumkin.

== Career ==
Frumkin worked as a bank teller before beginning his writing career as a journalist. He first took up poetry seriously while enrolled in an adult education class taught by the poet Thomas McGrath. During the 1950s he was poetry editor of a literary journal, Coastlines, which he co-founded with Mel Weisburd in 1955. In 1966, Frumkin moved to Albuquerque, New Mexico, to take a teaching position at the University of New Mexico, where he remained until his retirement in 1994. At the University Frumkin edited the Blue Mesa Review and taught a number of poets, including Gloria Frym, Joy Harjo, Simon Ortiz and Leslie Marmon Silko.

In 1967, he was among more than five hundred writers and editors who signed the "Writers and Editors War Tax Protest" pledge, vowing to refuse to pay the 10% Vietnam War Tax surcharge proposed by president Johnson.

Frumkin's poetry appeared in Chelsea, Conjunctions, Evergreen Review, Kayak, New Letters, The Paris Review, Poetry Magazine, Sulfur, and many other literary magazines, and in anthologies ranging from Robert Bly's Forty Poems Touching on Recent American History (1970) to The Best American Poetry 2002, edited by Robert Creeley. His work showed the influence of Surrealism.

== Works ==
- The Hawk and the Lizard (Swallow Press, 1963)
- The Orange Tree (Cyfoeth, 1965)
- The Rainbow-Walker (Grasshopper Press, 1968)
- Dostoevsky and Other Nature Poems (Solo Press, 1972)
- Locust Cry: Poems 1958-1965 (San Marcos Press, 1973)
- The Indian Rio Grande: Recent Poems from 3 Cultures (co-editor, with Stanley Noyes; San Marcos Press, 1977)
- The Mystic Writing-Pad (Red Hill Press, 1977)
- Loops (San Marcos Press, 1979)
- Clouds and Red Earth (Swallow Press, 1981)
- A Lover's Quarrel with America (Automatic Press, 1985)
- A Sweetness in the Air (Solo Press, 1987)
- Comma in the Ear (Living Batch Press, 1990)
- Saturn Is Mostly Weather: Selected and Uncollected Poems (Cinco Puntos Press, 1992)
- The Old Man Who Swam Away and Left Only His Wet Feet (La Alameda Press, 1998)
- Falling Into Meditation (Instress, 1999)
- Freud by Other Means (La Alameda Press, 2003)
- The Curvature of the Earth (co-author, with Alvaro Cardona-Hine; University of New Mexico, 2007)

== Papers ==
Frumkin's papers are held in the Center for Southwest Research at UNM's Zimmerman Library.
