= Michael Burkard =

American poet and educator (1947–2024)

- Born: 1947; Rome, New York, U.S.
- Died: December 23, 2024 (aged 77)
- Occupation: Poet

Academic background
- Education: Hobart and William Smith Colleges; Iowa Writers' Workshop

Michael Paul Burkard (1947 – December 23, 2024) was an American poet and educator, who was an associate professor in the M.F.A. Program in Creative Writing at Syracuse University (1997–2024), and the author of at least ten volumes of poetry.

== Life and career ==
Burkard graduated from Hobart College (B.A.) in 1968 and from the Iowa Writers' Workshop with an MFA in 1973. He taught at Kirkland College (1975–78) and Sarah Lawrence College (1983–84, 1986–87). In the years between 1968 and 1973 (his two degrees), Burkard spent more than 2 years as a psychiatric aide in a hospital. He has stated that the latter experience was very important to his development and career as a poet. (Note: " Burkard also notes that "in the two and a half years between my undergraduate and graduate work I was a psychiatric aide at McLean Hospital. And in the late 1970's I was a writing fellow at the Fine Arts Work Center (FAWC) in Provincetown. These two experiences were at least as formative as my "degree" days. Meeting with artists at FAWC was terribly helpful and important for me. I have an avid interest in drawing, and have been drawing since 1982, thanks to the suggestion of a dear-artist-friend, Mary Hackett. And I have been writing songs in various ways since I was ten years old. I am as much influenced by art and music as I am literature, and as much by fiction writing as poetry.")

Before joining the faculty at Syracuse University beginning in 1997, Burkard was a visiting writer at New York University (1991) and the University of Louisville (1992, 1996), as well as a writer-in-residence at Austin Peay State University (1990).

During his lifetime, hundreds of Burkard's poems appeared in many publications, including American Poetry Review, The Paris Review, Ploughshares, APR, Ironwood and Quarterly West, to name just a few. His poems were included in The Best American Poetry anthology four times (2000, 2001, 2004, and 2005).

Burkard also self-published two books of his drawings: Michael Burkard and a flower with milk in a shadow beside it. (Note: Some of the drawings have appeared in issues of Salt Hill Journal and Hunger Mountain.)

Burkard died on December 23, 2024, at the age of 77.

== Critical reception ==
Book reviews have noted that various poets have influenced Burkard. A retrospective analysis of Burkard's poetry following the publication of his selected and "uncollected" poems in 2008 (Envelope of Night), noted the influence of Robert Creeley, Denise Levertov, Wallace Stevens, and Tomas Tranströmer. Some of the critical analysis places him in various poetic legacies and lineages, including Surrealism and The New American Poetry.

Burkard's poetics have been described differently over the years. In the 1970s, the content of his poetry took the form of the "narrative autobiographical poem". Later on, by the decade of the 2000s, the Harvard Review says, Burkard's work was "invested in a metaphysics of relationship, probing into how we treat each other (and hence ourselves)."

Other reviewers from the same time period also noted that where Burkard goes wrong is when he reverts to a style of "simple Confessionalism," even while the best of them "break from reality and American lyrical status quo to offer timeless, elegant revelations." Kirkus Reviews pointed out that at times, Burkard's late style was of "uneven quality" but that "a connection to Burkard's work, once established, is worth the effort expended."

== Awards ==
- 2008 Guggenheim Fellow
- 1984, 1985, and 1999 Jerome J. Shestack Poetry Award, from American Poetry Review
- 1986 Denise and Mel Cohen Award, from Ploughshares
- 1988 Pushcart Prize
- 1988 Whiting Award
- two NEA grants
- Alice Fay Di Castagnola Award from the Poetry Society of America
- 1978–79 Fine Arts Work Center in Provincetown Fellowship
- 1982 MacDowell Colony Fellowship
- two New York Foundation for the Arts grants

== Selected bibliography ==
- Ploughshares "Ghost" Winter 2025-26
- "Cherry Eye", American Poetry Review
- Envelope of night: Selected and Uncollected poems, 1966–1990. Nightboat Books. 2008. ISBN 978-0-9767185-6-7.
- Unsleeping. Sarabande Books. 2001. ISBN 978-1-889330-53-2. "Michael Burkard."
- Pennsylvania Collection Agency. New Issues/Western Michigan University. 2001. ISBN 978-1-930974-00-5. (Note: "Michael Burkard's latest book (Pennsylvania Collection Agency) — "full of revenants, revisitations, and regrets — is similarly lingering and resonant. Fifteen years passed between the writing of the poems that became Pennsylvania Collection Agency and their publication as a cohesive collection by New Issues, yet they're not dated.")
- Entire Dilemma. Sarabande Books. 1998. ISBN 978-1-889330-18-1. "Michael Burkard."
- My Secret Boat: A Notebook of Prose and Poems. W. W. Norton & Company. 1990. ISBN 978-0-393-30748-1.
- Fictions from the Self. W. W. Norton & Company. 1989. ISBN 978-0-393-30568-5.
- Ruby for Grief. University of Pittsburgh Press. 1982. ISBN 978-0-8229-3450-9.
- The Fires They Kept. Los Angeles: Metro Book Co. 1986. ISBN 978-0-915371-03-7.
- In a white light: poems. L'Epervier Press. 1977. ISBN 0-934834-72-5.

=== Anthologies ===
- Robert Hass; David Lehman, eds. (2001). "Notes About My Face". The Best American Poetry 2001. Simon and Schuster. ISBN 978-0-7432-0384-5.

=== Ploughshares ===
- Ploughshares, Winter 2025–26. Poem
- "Pentimento". Ploughshares. Spring 1985. Archived from the original on June 30, 2007.
- "The Family". Ploughshares. Spring 1985. Archived from the original on June 30, 2007.
- "Mornings Like a Vase". Ploughshares. Spring 1985. Archived from the original on June 30, 2007.
- "Side with Stars". Ploughshares. Spring 1985. Archived from the original on July 17, 2002.
- "Star for a Glass". Ploughshares. Spring 1985.
- "The World at Dusk". Ploughshares. Winter 1986. Archived from the original on June 30, 2007.
- "Little Final Sunlight". Ploughshares. Winter 1986.
- "Too Many Drops". Ploughshares. Winter 1986. Archived from the original on December 1, 2007.
- "Moon's Rule". Ploughshares. Winter 1986. Archived from the original on October 12, 2007.
- "The Summer of the Thief". Ploughshares. Winter 1986. Archived from the original on June 30, 2007.
- "The Brothers". Ploughshares. Winter 1986. Archived from the original on June 30, 2007.
