= Dara Barrois/Dixon =

American poet

- Born: December 30, 1949 (age 76) Hôtel-Dieu, New Orleans, Louisiana
- Occupation: Poet
- Spouse: James Tate
- Children: Emily Pettit

Dara Barrois/Dixon (Dara Wier) (born December 30, 1949) is an American poet and author. She has received awards from the Lannan Foundation, American Poetry Review, The Poetry Center Book Award, Guggenheim Foundation, National Endowment for the Arts and Massachusetts Cultural Council. She has been poet-in-residence at the University of Montana, University of Texas Austin, Emory University, and the University of Utah; she was the 2005 Louis Rubin chair at Hollins University in Roanoke, Virginia. She lives and works in Factory Hollow in Western Massachusetts. Emily Pettit and Guy Gerard Pettit are her daughter and son.

== Biography ==
Barrois/Dixon was born in Hôtel-Dieu, New Orleans, Louisiana, raised in Belle Chasse and Naomi, Louisiana, attended Catholic grade schools in New Orleans and Gretna, Louisiana, and high school in Baton Rouge, Louisiana, attended Louisiana State University and Longwood University. She received a Master of Fine Arts degree in poetry from Bowling Green University, 1974.

She has lived in Louisiana, Virginia, Pennsylvania, Georgia, Ohio, Texas, Alabama, New Mexico, Colorado, Montana, and Massachusetts, and spent time in San Miguel de Allende, Mexico, and Mississippi. She writes poetry, prose and a column, "INSIDE UNDIVIDED", on chance, fate and context, from 2010 to 2015 for Flying Object's (arts non-profit) website, and from 2015 on the literary magazine jubilat's website. She has taught poetry workshops and seminars at Bowling Green University, University of Pittsburgh, Hollins University, Emory University, University of Montana, University of Massachusetts Amherst and for summer or winter workshops in Aspen, Key West, Santa Fe, Virginia, Bennington, and the University of Massachusetts Juniper Workshops (which she co-founded in 2003 as a part of the Juniper Initiative which she co-directs).

Barrois/Dixon was married to poet James Tate until his death in 2015. Her daughter from a previous marriage is poet Emily Pettit. They often work together.

== Work ==
Dara Barrois/Dixon has published several books and her work has also been included in recent volumes of Pushcart Prize Anthology and Best American Poetry. She has also been published in jubilat, "B O D Y", FOU, Maggy, Make, Matters, American Poetry Review, Boston Review, Volt, Hollins Critic, Now Culture, LIT, Conduit, Bat City Review, Salt River, Telephone, OH NO, glitterpony, The Nation, Open City, notnostrums, The Blue Letter, Superstition Review, Fairy Tale Review, Mississippi Review, Massachusetts Review, Denver Quarterly, slope, Poetry Time, Ink Node, Sprung Formal, Lungful, Scythe, Tin House, The Baffler, Mead, Similar Peaks, Io, and other publications. Her poems have appeared on the Academy of American Poets poem-a-day feature, the PEN website, poemflow.

== Bibliography ==
- Blood, Hook & Eye, University of Texas Press, 1977, 1980 ISBN 0-292-70720-7
- The 8-Step Grapevine, CMU Press, 1980 ISBN 0-915604-38-8
- All You Have in Common, CMU, 1984 ISBN 0-88748-005-5
- The Book of Knowledge, CMU, 1987 ISBN 0-88748-067-5
- Blue for the Plough, CMU, 1990 ISBN 0-88748-137-X
- Our Master Plan, CMU, 1999 ISBN 0-88748-294-5
- Voyages in English, CMU, 2001 ISBN 0-88748-351-8
- Hat on a Pond, Verse Press, 2001 ISBN 0-9703672-6-0
- Reverse Rapture, Verse Press, 2005 ISBN 0-9746353-4-0
- Remnants of Hannah, Wave Books, 2006 ISBN 978-1-933517-08-7
- Selected Poems, Wave Books, 2009 ISBN 978-1-933517-38-4
- A Civilian's Journal of the War Years, The Song Cave, 2011
- You Good Thing, Wave Books, 2013 ISBN 978-1-933517-67-4
- In the Still of the Night, Wave Books, 2017 ISBN 978-1-940696-57-7
- I Would Like to Return the Scarf to You in Good Condition, Small Anchor Books, forthcoming
- You Stare as if Staring Were the Start of All Stars, Pilot Books, forthcoming
- The Usual Ratio Between Banality and Wonder, Rain Taxi, 2016
- In the Still of the Night, Wave Books, 2017 ISBN 978-1-940696-57-7
- Tolstoy Killed Anna Karenina, Wave Books, 2022 ISBN
