= Nathaniel Mackey =

American writer (born 1947)

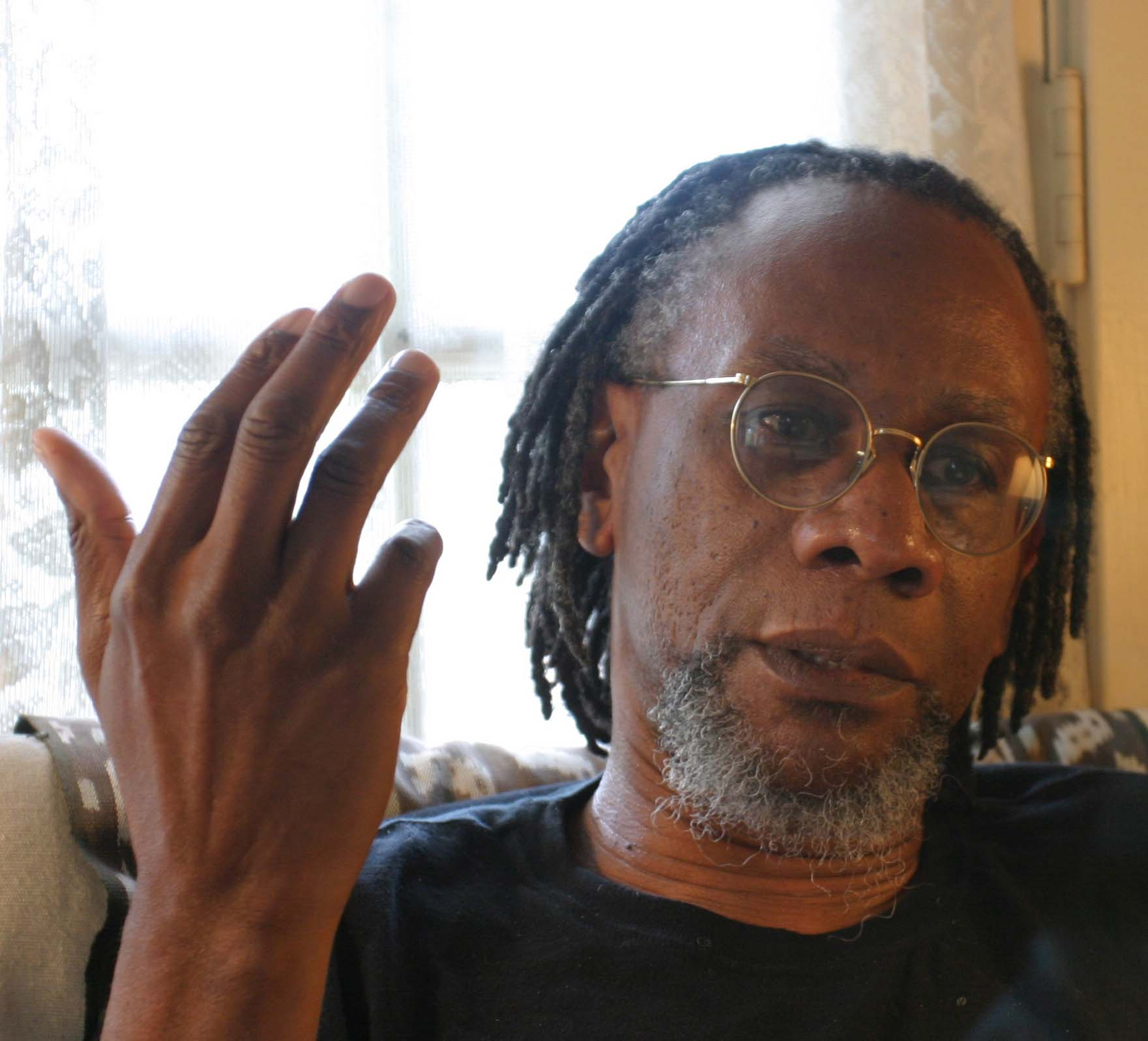
- Nathaniel Mackey, photo by Gloria Graham during the video taping of Add-Verse, 2005
- Born: 1947 (age 78–79); Miami, Florida, United States
- Education: Princeton University (BA); Stanford University (PhD)
- Writing career
- Genres: Poetry, Fiction, Literary Criticism
- Notable works: Splay Anthem; From a Broken Bottle Traces of Perfume Still Emanate
- Notable awards: National Book Award (2006); Bollingen Prize (2015)

Nathaniel Mackey is an American poet, novelist, anthologist, literary critic and editor. He is the Reynolds Price Professor of Creative Writing at Duke University and a Chancellor of The Academy of American Poets. Mackey is currently teaching a poetry workshop at Duke University.

He has been editor and publisher of Hambone since 1982 and he won the National Book Award for Poetry in 2006. In 2014, he was awarded the Ruth Lilly Poetry Prize, and in 2015 he won Yale's Bollingen Prize for American Poetry.

== Biography ==
Nathaniel Mackey was born in 1947 in Miami, Florida and moved to California at age three when his parents split. As a teen, he started listening to jazz at his brother's suggestion, which later influenced his work. He visited Princeton University as a high school student along with Gene Washington and was able to see live jazz in Manhattan. The trip was instrumental in the decision to attend the university. After he graduated with a BA, he returned to Southern California to teach algebra at a junior high school.

In 1970, Mackey enrolled in Stanford University for his doctorate. His dissertation was about the Black Mountain poets and the poetry they created with the human rhythms of breath and utterance. After graduation, he taught at University of Wisconsin and the University of Southern California before moving on to the literature department at the University of California, Santa Cruz in 1979. He held that position until 2010 when he moved with his family to North Carolina to take a position at Duke University.

== Poetry ==
Mackey's books of poetry include the chapbooks Four for Trane (1978) and Septet for the End of Time (1983); and the books Eroding Witness (1985), School of Udhra (1993), Whatsaid Serif (1998), Splay Anthem (2006), Nod House (2011), and Blue Fasa (2016), as well as the books Tej Bet, So's Notice, and Nerve Church, which were published together as a boxed set called Double Trio in 2021. In 2016, Black Ocean Books published a collection called Lay Ghost that featured songs that later appeared in So's Notice.

"...Mackey's series of improvisatory jazz-inspired fictions locates a ground between invention and listening that he defines as the source of culture itself. All culture, for Mackey, is a form of listening to what "we" are collectively improvising."

Barrett Watten

Mackey's poetry combines African mythology, African-American musical traditions, and Modernist poetic experiment. His ongoing serial projects, "Song of the Andoumboulou" and "Mu", explore the relationship of poetry and historical memory, as well the dissonance between his American context and those of Africa and the Middle-East.

== Fiction ==
Mackey has published five volumes of an ongoing prose project entitled From A Broken Bottle Traces of Perfume Still Emanate. The books are titled Bedouin Hornbook (1986), Djbot Baghostus's Run (1993), Atet A. D. (2001), Bass Cathedral (2008), and Late Arcade (2017).

Bedouin Hornbook was inspired by the experience of seeing a jazz ensemble in which he was the only person in the audience. His series of letters explores playing in a band like that. The book is also the first in the “Broken Bottle” series.

== Criticism and editing ==
In 1974, Mackey became an editor of the poetry journal Hambone, later becoming the sole editor and publisher in 1982.

Mackey is the author of Discrepant Engagement: Dissonance, Cross-Culturality, and Experimental Writing (1993), an influential book of literary theory, and more recently of Paracritical Hinge: Essays, Talks, Notes, Interviews (2004). He co-edited Moment's Notice: Jazz in Poetry and Prose with Art Lange (1993).

== Personal life ==
At Stanford, Mackey met bell hooks, whom he dated until the mid 1980s. He married Pascale Gaitet, a specialist in French literature, in 1991. The couple later had three children: Naima, Gabriella, and Ian.

== Awards ==
- 1993 Whiting Award
- 2006 National Book Award, Poetry, for Splay Anthem
- 2007 Foundation for Contemporary Arts Grants to Artists Award
- 2010 Guggenheim Fellowship
- 2014 Ruth Lilly Poetry Prize
- 2015 Bollingen Prize for American Poetry
- 2016 Bobbitt National Prize for Poetry for Lifetime Achievement

== Works ==
=== Poetry Collections ===
- Mackey, Nathaniel (1985), Eroding Witness
- Mackey, Nathaniel (1993), School of Udhra
- Mackey, Nathaniel (1998), Whatsaid Serif
- Mackey, Nathaniel (2002), Splay Anthem
- Mackey, Nathaniel (2011), Nod House
- Mackey, Nathaniel (2014), Outer Pradesh
- Mackey, Nathaniel (2015), Blue Fasa
- Mackey, Nathaniel (2021), Tej Bet
- Mackey, Nathaniel (2021), So's Notice
- Mackey, Nathaniel (2021), Nerve Church

The last three issued in a box set as:

- Mackey, Nathaniel (2021), Double Trio

=== Fiction ===
- Mackey, Nathaniel (1986), Bedouin Hornbook
- Mackey, Nathaniel (1993), Djbot Baghosthus's Run
- Mackey, Nathaniel (2001), Atet A.D.
- Mackey, Nathaniel (2008), Bass Cathedral
- Mackey, Nathaniel (2017), Late Arcade

The first three issued in one volume as:

- Mackey, Nathaniel (2010), From a Broken Bottle traces of Perfume Still Emanate Volumes 1-3

The following two individual volumes are volumes 4 and 5 of From a Broken Bottle traces of Perfume Still Emanate

=== Essays ===
- (1993), Discrepant Engagement: Dissonance, Cross-Culturality, and Experimental Writing
- (2018), Paracritical Hinge: Essays, Talks, Notes, Interviews
