= Sarah Manguso =

American writer and poet (born 1974)

- Manguso, author of Very Cold People
- Born: 1974 (age 52); Boston, Massachusetts, U.S.
- Alma mater: Harvard University (BA); University of Iowa (MFA)
- Occupations: Writer; poet; essayist; professor
- Writing career
- Genres: Novel; memoir; poetry; essay
- Notable works: Very Cold People (2022) * The Guardians (2012) * Liars (2024) * 300 Arguments (2017)
- Notable awards: Rome Prize (2008) * Guggenheim Fellowship (2012)

Sarah Manguso (born 1974) is an American writer and poet. Known for her compressed, aphoristic, and fragmentary prose, she is the author of poetry collections, memoirs, and novels. In 2008, she was awarded the Rome Prize in literature by the American Academy of Arts and Letters. Her memoir The Two Kinds of Decay (2008) was named an "Editors' Choice" title by The New York Times Book Review and a 2008 "Best Nonfiction Book of the Year" by the San Francisco Chronicle. Her book Ongoingness: The End of a Diary (2015) was also named a New York Times "Editors' Choice".

Manguso's debut novel, Very Cold People, was published by Penguin Random House in 2022. Her second novel, Liars, was published in 2024.

== Early life and education ==
Manguso was born and raised in Wellesley, Massachusetts. She received her B.A. from Harvard University and her M.F.A. from the Iowa Writers' Workshop.

== Career ==
Manguso has taught creative writing at the Pratt Institute and in the graduate program at The New School. She has also taught in the MFA programs at Antioch University and New England College. She lives in Los Angeles.

Her poems and prose have appeared in Harper's Magazine, The New York Times Magazine, and The Paris Review. Her poems have appeared in four editions of The Best American Poetry.

== Awards and honors ==
- 2003: Princeton University Hodder Fellowship
- 2008: Rome Prize
- 2011: Wellcome Book Prize shortlist for The Two Kinds of Decay
- 2012: Guggenheim Fellowship
- 2012: Salon What To Read Award for The Guardians

== Published works ==
=== Novels ===
- Very Cold People (Hogarth Press, 2022) ISBN 978-0-593-24123-3
- Liars (Hogarth Press, 2024) ISBN 978-0-593-24125-7

=== Non-fiction and memoirs ===
- The Two Kinds of Decay (Farrar, Straus and Giroux, 2008) ISBN 978-0-374-27982-0
- The Guardians: An Elegy (Farrar, Straus and Giroux, 2012) ISBN 978-0-374-16724-0
- Ongoingness: The End of a Diary (Graywolf Press, 2015) ISBN 978-1-55597-703-0
- 300 Arguments (Graywolf Press, 2017) ISBN 978-1-55597-764-1

=== Poetry ===
- The Captain Lands in Paradise (Alice James Books, 2002) ISBN 978-1-882295-35-7
- Siste Viator (Four Way Books, 2006) ISBN 978-1-884800-69-6
- The Captain Asks for a Show of Hands (McSweeney's, 2010) ISBN 978-1-934781-67-8
