= Dennis Nurkse =

American poet

Dennis Nurkse, Poet
- Born: December 13, 1949 (age 76); Brooklyn, New York, U.S.
- Education: Harvard College (BA)
- Occupations: Poet; Novelist
- Dennis Nurske Poetry Reading of Liberation in Winter
- Website: www.dnurkse.net

Dennis Nurkse is an American poet from Brooklyn. He is the author of twelve poetry collections. His work has been reviewed in the New York Times, the New Yorker, the Guardian, the Times Literary Supplement (UK), translated into a dozen languages, and featured at the Jaipur International Literary Festival (India) and the Aldeburgh Poetry Festival (UK).

In human rights work, Nurkse was a founding member of Amnesty International USA Group 9 in 1973 and coordinated volunteer campaigns on repression and antisemitism in Argentina. He was the author of At Special Risk: The Impact of Political Violence on Minors in Haiti (Lutheran Immigration and Refugee Services, 1992). In 2007, Nurkse was elected to a term on the board of directors of Amnesty International-USA.

== Life ==
Nurkse is the son of the eminent Estonian economist Ragnar Nurkse. He graduated from Harvard College. In June 1996, he was named Brooklyn Poet Laureate. He has taught workshops at Rikers Island, and his poems about prison life appeared in The American Poetry Review, Evergreen Review, The New Yorker, The Paris Review, TriQuarterly, The Kenyon Review, and other magazines. He has taught at The New School University and Columbia University, and is currently on the faculty at Sarah Lawrence College. He has translated anonymous medieval and flamenco Spanish lyric poems and has written about the Spanish pastoral poems by contemporary Giannina Braschi. His work has appeared in The Evergreen Review, The New Yorker, The Atlantic Monthly, Poetry, The American Poetry Review, The Kenyon Review, The Times Literary Supplement, Ploughshares, The Paris Review. His subjects have included mental health, trauma, and the September 11 terrorist attacks.

== Honors and awards ==
- 2007 Guggenheim Fellow
- Pushcart Prize, 2020, 2022, 2023
- Shortlisted for Forward Prize for best poetry collection published in the UK, 2011
- Literature Award from the American Academy of Arts and Letters, 2009
- Charles Angoff Prize, Literary Review, 2004
- Frederick Bock Prize, The Modern Poetry Foundation, 2003
- Tanne Foundation Fellowship, 2000
- Brooklyn Poet Laureate 1996-2000
- 1990 Whiting Award
- Bess Hokin Prize, Modern Poetry Foundation, 1988
- NEA fellowship
- NYFA fellowships

== Bibliography ==
=== Poetry ===
Collections

- Isolation in Action, State Street Press, 1987. ISBN 978-0-937669-42-6
- Shadow Wars, Hanging Loose Press, 1988. ISBN 978-0-914610-53-3
- Staggered Lights, Owl Creek Press, (July 1990), ISBN 978-0-937669-42-6
- Voices Over Water, Graywolf Press (July 1993), ISBN 978-1-55597-188-5
- Leaving Xaia, Four Way, 2000. ISBN 9781884800269
- The Rules of Paradise, Four Way (December 2001), ISBN 978-1-884800-38-2
- The Fall, Alfred A. Knopf, 2004.
- Burnt Island. Alfred A. Knopf. 2005. ISBN 978-1-4000-4350-7.
- The Border Kingdom, Alfred A. Knopf, 2008.
- A Night in Brooklyn, Alfred A. Knopf, 2012.
- Love in the Last Days, Alfred Knopf, 2018.
- A Country of Strangers, Alfred Knopf, 2022.
- Haaled Ule Vee (Estonian translation of Voices over Water), EKSA, 2023. ISBN 9789916677568

Anthologies

- Dennis Loy Johnson; Valerie Merians, eds. (2002). Poetry after 9/11: an anthology of New York poets. Melville House Pub. ISBN 978-0-9718659-1-4.
- Charles Wright; David Lehman, eds. (2008). Best American Poetry. Scriber Pub. ISBN 9781416579663.
- Wendy Beckett, eds. (2007). Speaking to the Heart: 100 Favorite Poems. Constable Pub. ISBN 978-1845294656.
- The Montreal Poetry Prize Anthology, Montreal, Canada, 2014.
- Amit Majmudar, eds. (2017). Resistance, Rebellion, Life: 50 Poems Now. Alfred A. Knopf Pub. ISBN 978-1524711320.
- Christopher Okemwa, eds. (2023). Ukraine: A World Anthology of Poems on War. Kistrech Theatre International Pub. ISBN 9789914988536
