= Ira Sadoff =

American poet (born 1945)

- Born: March 7, 1945 (age 81); Brooklyn, New York City, U.S.
- Occupation: Poet Professor

Ira Sadoff is an American poet, critic, novelist and short story writer.

== Life ==
Sadoff was born on March 7, 1945, in Brooklyn, New York. He earned a B.A. (1966) from Cornell University in industrial and labor relations and an M.F.A. (1968) from the University of Oregon. He has taught at colleges and universities including the University of Virginia, the Iowa Writer's Workshop and the M.F.A. program at Warren Wilson College. He is currently the Arthur Jeremiah Roberts Professor of Literature at Colby College in Waterville, Maine.

== Work ==
Sadoff is the author of eight volumes of poetry, most recently True Faith (2012). His other recent poetry collections include Barter (2003) and Grazing (1998). Over three hundred of his poems, thirty short stories and a number of essays have appeared in major literary magazines, including The New Yorker, The American Poetry Review, The Paris Review, The Nation, The New Republic, Esquire, Antaeus, The Hudson Review, and The Partisan Review. Poems in Grazing have been awarded the Leonard Shestack Prize, the Pushcart Poetry Prize, and the George Bogin Memorial Prize from the Poetry Society of America. He has received Fellowships from the National Endowment for the Arts and the John Simon Guggenheim Memorial Foundation. Sadoff has characterized himself as "one poet among a decreasing minority who is trying to resist the return to formalism, the sterile, conservative, aesthete academicism of the nineteen-fifties."

His book, History Matters: Contemporary Poetry on the Margins of American Culture, a collection of his critical work, was released on March 2, 2009, by the University of Iowa Press.

== Bibliography ==
=== Poetry ===
==== Collections ====
- Sadoff, Ira (1975). Settling down.
- Palm Reading in Winter. 1978.
- Maine: Nine Poems. 1981.
- A Northern Calendar. 1982.
- Emotional Traffic. 1990.
- Sadoff, Ira (1998). Grazing. University of Illinois Press. ISBN 0-252-07120-4.
- Sadoff, Ira (2003). Barter. University of Illinois Press. ISBN 0-252-06737-1.
- Sadoff, Ira (2012). True Faith. BOA Editions, Limited. ISBN 978-1-934414-82-8.
- Country, Living. 2020. ISBN 978-1-948579-10-0.

==== List of poems ====
Title	Year	First published	Reprinted/collected
I never needed things	2016	The New Yorker	

=== Other ===
- Uncoupling. 1982. ISBN 9780395321362.
- An Ira Sadoff Reader: A collection of stories, poems, essays. 1992.
- Sadoff, Ira (2009). History Matters: Contemporary Poetry on the Margins of American Culture. University of Iowa Press. ISBN 978-1-58729-797-7.
