= Pam Rehm =

American poet (born 1967)

Pam Rehm (born October 21, 1967 New Cumberland, Pennsylvania) is an American poet.

== Life ==
Her work has appeared in Talisman, The Transcendental Friend, and The Nation.

== Education ==
Graduated from Shippensburg University of Pennsylvania

== Awards ==
- 1994 National Poetry Series, for To Give It Up, selected by Barbara Guest

== Works ==
- "Indebted", Duration Press
- "Journey Home", Duration Press
- "An Empty Account", Duration Press
- "Acts of Love", Poetry Foundation
- "Acts of Vexation", Poetry Foundation
- Pollux (PDF). Leave Books. 1992. (chapbook)
- Piecework. Oblēk Editions. 1992. ISBN 978-1-879645-06-6.
- The Garment in Which No One Had Slept. Burning Deck. 1993. ISBN 978-0-930901-87-5.
- To Give It Up. Sun & Moon Press. 1995. ISBN 978-1-55713-212-3.
- Gone to Earth. Flood Editions. 2001. ISBN 978-0-9710059-1-4.
- Small works. Flood Editions. 2005. ISBN 978-0974690261.
- The Larger Nature. Flood Editions. 2011. ISBN 9780981952086.
- Time Will Show. Shearsman Books. 2018. ISBN 9781848615991.

=== Anthologies ===
- American Poets in the 21st Century: The New Poetics. Talisman House Publishers. July 1998. ISBN 978-1-883689-62-9.
- Robert Creeley, ed. (2002). The Best American Poetry 2002. Simon & Schuster. ISBN 978-0-7432-0386-9.

== Reviews ==
Rehm is an iconoclast not because she is, at times, formally inventive but because she reaches for what can't be seen, that is, she strives for knowledge of "what it means to be in relation." Her insurgency should, at least partly, become ours. Rehm is not the only one who must "figure out what to believe and where to begin." To do this, must we open our cabinets and break open the black egg that may hide our conscious ear?

The poems in Small Works are short pieces and sequences of short pieces—small works—but "small" describes not only their length but the pieces' style as well. The poems are spare.

Judging from the beautifully wrought poetic accomplishments of Small Works, mothering and poetry for Pam Rehm have without doubt combined to create a productive paradox, an incisive kind of linguistic and philosophical stirring into or mulling over life-as-lived, through commonplace yet uniquely employed forms of rhetorical sharing in soulful, songful contradiction.
