= Poetry Bus Tour =

2006 literary event in the United States and Canada

Poetry Bus Tour was a literary event sponsored by independent poetry publisher Wave Books in 2006. It featured a tour of contemporary poets, traveling by a forty-foot Biodiesel bus, who stopped to perform in fifty North American cities over the course of fifty days. Starting in Seattle, Washington, where Wave Books is based, on September 4, the bus visited major cities in every region of the United States, as well as three stops in Canada, before returning on October 27, 2006. The bus made stops at venues in each city, where participating poets gave readings and lectures. Organized by poets Joshua Beckman, Matthew Zapruder, Lori Shine, Monica Fambrough, and Travis Nichols the tour featured many poets published by the press, as well as performance artists and local readers. One reviewer characterised the project as being "like some strange collective of disenfranchised rock musicians, shorn of their instruments and forced to travel together for warmth", while another posed the question, "What would happen if poets started acting like one big heavy metal band?"

== Overview ==
The Poetry Bus started its tour from Seattle, Washington, in September 2006. It traveled from the Pacific Northwest, across the upper Midwest, and as far as New England and parts of Canada. The Bus traveled south along the Eastern Seaboard, as far as Georgia, then headed west through areas of the Deep South and Southwest. After reaching the West Coast again in Los Angeles, the tour aimed north through California and Oregon before returning to Seattle for a finale event at the foot of the Space Needle in late October. Some stops involved multiple readings in the same city, and the types of venues varied from stop to stop (including art installations, festivals, a Naval Academy, historic sites, and prisons). The bus itself was a forty-foot-long Biodiesel Motorcoach with the words "Poetry Bus" painted on the sides. Passengers varied along the way, but as many as 38 writers, organizers, and journalists slept in the bus at once. The tour was documented on a blog.

== Poets ==
Performers varied from venue to venue, but a handful remained consistent throughout the majority of the readings. Participants included, alphabetically: Kim Addonizio, Hector Ahumada, Will Alexander, Beth Anderson, Craig Arnold, Ken Babstock, Mutant Ballyhoo, Mary Jo Bang, Jennifer Barone, Polina Barskova, Nathan Bartel, Grace Bauer, Eric Baus, Jill Beauchesne, Joshua Beckman, Erin Belieu, Erica Bernheim, Anselm Berrigan, Jen Bervin, Anne Boyer, Michael Brodeur, Lee Ann Brown, Paul Closson Buck, Suzanne Buffam, Nicole Burgund, Mairead Byrne, Alex Caldiero, Tina Brown Celona, JoAnn Chang, Vic Chesnutt, Joshua Clover, Gentian Cocoli, John Colburn, Carrie St. George Comer, Daniel Comiskey, Kevin Connolly, Gillian Conoley, CAConrad, Matt Cook, Martin Corless-Smith, Joel Craig, Michael Earl Craig, Crystal Curry, Kyle Dargan, Tom I. Davis, Christine Deavel, Tom Devaney, Chris Dombrowski, Timothy Donnelly, Michael Dumanis, Thomas Sayers Ellis, Brian Engel, Zhang Er, Kelly Everding, Larry Fagin, Monica Fambrough, Chris Fishbach, Lisa Fishman, Susan Firer, Sherrie Flick, Nick Flynn, Tonya Foster, Graham Foust, Sarah Fox, Peter Gizzi, Lara Glenum, John Godfrey, Noah Eli Gordon, Dean Gorman, Arielle Greenberg, Kate Hall, Matt Hart, Matthea Harvey, James Haug, Christian Hawkey, Anthony Hawley, Cole Heinowitz, Thomas Heise, Dennis Held, Scott Helmes, Nicole Henares, Bob Hicok, Jen Hofer, Janet Holmes, Marie Howe, Elizabeth Hughey, Maggie Jackson, Major Jackson, Philip Jenks, Laura Jensen, Tyehimba Jess, Amaud Johnson, Julia Johnson, Andrew Joron, Bhanu Kapil, Ingrid Keir, Sally Keith, Michael Kelleher, Ariana Kelley, Mimi Khalvati, Ish Klein, Joanna Klink, Caroline Knox, Noelle Kocot, Melissa Kwasny, Deborah Landau, Dorothea Lasky, Katy Lederer, Dana Levin, Sueyen Juliette Lee, David Lehman, Sarah Mangold, Sabrina Orah Mark, JW Marshall, Cate Marvin, Tod Marshall, Anthony McCann, Molly McDonald, Mark McMorris, Richard Meier, Catherine Meng, Ken Mikolowski, Chelsey Minnis, Albert Mobilio, K Silem Mohammad, Tracie Morris, Valzhyna Mort, Anna Moschovakis, Erín Moure, George Murray, Eileen Myles, Amanda Nadelberg, Maggie Nelson, Sierra Nelson, Aimee Nezhukumatathill, Hoa Nguyen, Travis Nichols, No Cry Sleep Solution, Melanie Noel, John Olson, Ethan Paquin, GE Patterson, Becky Peterson, Scott Poole, DA Powell, Stephen Powers, Kristen Prevallet, CE Putnam, Srikanth Reddy, Dwaine Rieves, David Rivard, David Roderick, Mary Ruefle, Damian Rogers, Matthew Rohrer, Martha Ronk, Catie Rosemurgy, Molly Russakoff, Standard Schaeffer, Robyn Schiff, Rob Schlegel, Zachary Schomburg, Vijay Seshadri, Prageeta Sharma, Brenda Shaughnessy, Frank Sherlock, Lori Shine, Evie Shockley, Eleni Sikelianos, Richard Siken, Bruce Smith, Dale Smith, ML Smoker, Dennis Somera, Juliana Spahr, Chuck Stebelton, Chris Stroffolino, Gwydion Suilebhan, Mathias Svalina, Chad Sweeney, Jennifer K. Sweeney, Cole Swensen, Arthur Sze, James Tate, William Taylor Jr., Edwin Torres, Trdmrc, David Trinidad, Nick Twemlow, Typing Explosion, Nance Vanwinckel, Sarah Vap, Nico Vassilakis, Vis a Vis Society, Miles Waggener, Catherine Wagner, Lewis Warsh, Kary Wayson, Joe Wenderoth, Betsy Wheeler, Sam White, Dara Wier, Joshua Marie Wilkinson, Dustin Williamson, Elizabeth Willis, Catherine Wing, Rebecca Wolff, Jon Woodward, Mark Yakich, Matvei Yankelevich, John Yau, Jake Adam York, Monica Youn, Dean Young, Stephanie Young, Karena Youtz, Maged Zaher, Matthew Zapruder, Rachel Zucker, 826 Laureates.

== Tour Dates ==
Readings were hosted in fifty cites across the United States and Canada (including Seattle twice, at the beginning and end of the tour) over the course of fifty days. The cities and venues included:

- 9/04/06: Seattle, WA - Bumbershoot Music Festival, Seattle Center (12 p.m., 5 p.m.)
- 9/05/06: Spokane, WA - Auntie's Bookshop (7:30 p.m.); Raw Sushi & Island Grill (9 p.m.)
- 9/06/06: Missoula, MT - Butler Creek Ranch
- 9/07/06: Boise, ID - Neurolux
- 9/08/06: Salt Lake City, UT - Ken Sanders Rare Books
- 9/09/06: Laramie, WY - Fine Arts Concert Hall, University of Wyoming Laramie
- 9/10/06: Denver, CO - Tivoli Turnhalle
- 9/11/06: Lincoln, NE - Sheldon Memorial Art Gallery
- 9/12/06: Omaha, NE - Omaha Public Library (11 a.m.)
- 9/12/06: Ames, IA - Octagon Center for the Arts (7 p.m.)
- 9/13/06: Ames, IA - Ames Public Schools (10 a.m.)
- 9/13/06: Iowa City, IA - Prairie Lights Books (7p.m.); Sanctuary Pub (9 p.m.)
- 9/14/06: Minneapolis, MN - Walker Arts Center
- 9/16/06: Orfordville, WI - Poetry Farm
- 9/17/06: Chicago, IL - The Green Mill
- 9/18/06: Milwaukee, WI - Schwartz Bookshop (7 p.m.); Linneman's Bar (9 p.m.)
- 9/19/06: Ann Arbor, MI - RC Auditorium
- 9/20/06: Pittsburgh, PA - Gist Street Reading Series
- 9/21/06: Lewisburg, PA - The Stadler Center for Poetry, Bucknell Hall, Bucknell University
- 9/22/06: Buffalo, NY - Albright-Knox Gallery
- 9/23/06: Toronto, Canada - Stone's Place
- 9/24/06: Ottawa, Canada - Blink Gallery, Header House
- 9/25/06: Montreal, Canada - The Green Room / Le Salon Vert
- 9/26/06: Northampton, MA - The Basement
- 9/27/06: Amherst, MA - Five College Mini-Tour (12-5 p.m.); Memorial Hall, University of Massachusetts (7 p.m.)
- 9/28/06: Boston, MA - The Burren Irish Pub
- 9/29/06: Providence, RI - First Unitarian Church
- 9/30/06: New York, NY - Dia Center for the Arts
- 10/01/06: Beacon, NY - Dia: Beacon
- 10/02/06: Philadelphia, PA - F.U.E.L. Collection
- 10/03/06: Annapolis, MD - The Naval Academy
- 10/04/06: Washington, DC - The Big Hunt
- 10/05/06: Richmond, VA - Chop Suey Books
- 10/06/06: Durham, NC - Baldwin Lofts
- 10/07/06: Asheville, NC - Malaprop's Books
- 10/08/06: Athens, GA - Athens Institute for Contemporary Arts
- 10/09/06: Tuscaloosa, AL - Bama Theater
- 10/10/06: New Orleans, LA - Contemporary Arts Center
- 10/11/06: Houston, TX - Aurora Picture Show
- 10/12/06: Houston, TX - Menil Collection (12 p.m.)
- 10/12/06: Austin, TX - Big Red Sun (6 p.m.)
- 10/13/06: Marfa, TX - Remote Broadcast
- 10/15/06: Santa Fe, NM - College of Santa Fe FORUM
- 10/16/06: Phoenix, AZ - The Trunk Space
- 10/17/06: Roden Crater, AZ - The Crater
- 10/18/06: Las Vegas, NV - New York New York Hotel and Casino, Brooklyn Room
- 10/19/06: Los Angeles, CA - Cal Arts, Butler Building
- 10/20/06: Los Angeles, CA - Museum of Natural History (3 p.m.); Machine Project (8 p.m.)
- 10/21/06: Santa Cruz, CA - First Congregational Church Fellowship Hall
- 10/22/06: San Francisco, CA - The Make Out Room (12 p.m.); Club Deluxe (7 p.m.)
- 10/23/06: Ashland, OR - The Meese Room, Hannon Library, Southern Oregon University
- 10/24/06: Portland, OR - Mississippi Studios
- 10/27/06: Seattle, WA - The Space Needle
