= Believer Poetry Award =

American literary award

The Believer Poetry Award is an American literary award presented yearly by The Believer magazine to poetry collections the magazine's editors thought were "the finest, and the most deserving of greater recognition" of the year. The inaugural award was in 2011 for books published in 2010.

== Winners and shortlist ==
The year below denotes when the books were published; the award is announced the following year. Thus below, the inaugural 2010 books were announced in early to mid-2011.

Winners are listed first, highlighted in boldface, and indicated with a double dagger (‡)

=== 2010 ===
The shortlist was announced in March 2011. The winner was announced in May 2011.

- **Atsuro Riley, Romey's Order**‡
- John Beer, The Waste Land and Other Poems
- Michael Earl Craig, Thin Kimono
- Lisa Robertson, R’s Boat
- Matthew Zapruder, Come On All You Ghosts

=== 2011 ===
The shortlist was announced in March 2012. The winner was announced in May 2012.

- **Heather Christle, The Trees The Trees**‡
- Alan Gilbert, Late in the Antenna Fields
- Laura Kasischke, Space, in Chains
- Jim Moore, Invisible Strings
- Kathleen Ossip, The Cold War

=== 2012 ===
The shortlist was announced in March 2013. The winner was announced in May 2013.

- **Samuel Amadon, The Hartford Book**‡
- James Arthur, Charms Against Lightning
- Emily Pettit, Goat in the Snow
- Gregory Sherl, The Oregon Trail is the Oregon Trail
- Sun Yung Shin, Rough, and Savage

=== 2013 ===
The shortlist was announced in March 2014. The winner was announced in May 2014.

- **Karen L. Green, Bough Down**‡
- Graham Foust, To Anacreon in Heaven and Other Poems
- Dobby Gibson, It Becomes You
- Mira Gonzalez, I Will Never Be Beautiful Enough to Make Us Beautiful Together
- Tess Taylor, The Forage House

=== 2014 ===
The shortlist was announced in April 2015.

- Jericho Brown, The New Testament
- CAConrad, **ECODEVIANCE: (Soma)tics for the Future Wilderness**‡
- Annelyse Gelman, Everyone I Love Is a Stranger to Someone
- Judy Halebsky, Tree Line
- Benjamin Landry, Particle and Wave

=== 2017 ===
The winner was announced in June 2018.

- Aditi Machado, Some Beheadings

=== 2018 ===
The longlist was announced in January 2019. The shortlist and winner was announced in April 2019.

- **Catherine Barnett, Human Hours** ‡
- Monica Ferrell, You Darling Thing
- Chelsey Minnis, Baby, I Don't Care
- Jamie Mortara, Good Morning America I Am Hungry and on Fire
- Ashley Toliver, Spectra

== See also ==
- Believer Book Award
- Believer Nonfiction Award
