= APR/Honickman First Book Prize =

Annual first-book poetry award of the American Poetry Review

- Awarded for: Debut poetry collection
- Country: United States
- Presented by: American Poetry Review and the Honickman Foundation
- Rewards: $3,000 and publication
- First award: 1998
- Website: https://aprweb.org/aprhonickman-first-book-prize

The APR/Honickman First Book Prize (also known as the American Poetry Review/Honickman First Book Prize) is an annual award for a debut book-length collection of poetry. Established in 1998, the prize is a partnership between The American Poetry Review (APR) and the Honickman Foundation, a Philadelphia-based philanthropic organization. The winning poet receives a $3,000 cash award, publication by the American Poetry Review, and distribution of the winning book by Copper Canyon Press through Consortium. A different distinguished poet serves as judge each year and writes an introduction to the winning book.

The prize is among the most prominent first-book awards in American poetry. Among its past winners, Gregory Pardlo won the 2015 Pulitzer Prize for Poetry for his second collection, Digest.

== History ==
The American Poetry Review is widely regarded as one of the most influential poetry journals in the United States. The prize was founded in 1998 through a partnership between APR and the Honickman Foundation. Joshua Beckman's manuscript for his debut collection, Things Are Happening, won the prize in its inaugural year, selected by Gerald Stern. The Foundation's involvement was rooted in a recognition that poetry is a powerful but under-served art form and that debut books of poetry face particular difficulty finding publishers.

Early judges included Louise Glück, who selected Dana Levin's In the Surgical Theatre in 1999. The 2008 winner, Matthew Dickman's All-American Poem, selected by Tony Hoagland, led to Dickman receiving the Kate Tufts Discovery Award and the 2009 Oregon Book Award in Poetry.

== Eligibility ==
The prize is open to poets who have not previously published a book-length collection of poems with a registered ISBN. Manuscripts must be at least 48 pages and the work of a sole author.

The editors of the American Poetry Review screen manuscripts before passing them to the judge, who reviews submissions in an anonymous process and will not award the prize to any writer with whom they have a personal conflict of interest.

== Winners ==
The year listed is the year in which the prize was awarded. Books are typically published in September of the same year.

Year	Poet	Title	Judge
1998	Joshua Beckman	Things Are Happening	Gerald Stern
1999	Dana Levin	In the Surgical Theatre	Louise Glück
2000	Anne Marie Macari	Ivory Cradle	Robert Creely
2001	Ed Pavlić	Paraph of Bone & Other Kinds of Blue	Adrienne Rich
2002	Kathleen Ossip	The Search Engine	Derek Walcott
2003	James McCorkle	Evidences	Jorie Graham
2004	Kevin Ducey	Rhinoceros	Yusef Komunyakaa
2005	Geoff Bouvier	Living Room	Heather McHugh
2006	David Roderick	Blue Colonial	Robert Pinsky
2007	Gregory Pardlo	Totem	Brenda Hillman
2008	Matthew Dickman	All-American Poem	Tony Hoagland
2009	Laura McKee	Uttermost Paradise Place	Claudia Keelan
2010	Melissa Stein	Rough Honey	Mark Doty
2011	Nathaniel Perry	Nine Acres	Marie Howe
2012	Tomás Q. Morín	A Larger Country	Tom Sleigh
2013	Maria Hummel	House and Fire	Fanny Howe
2014	Katherine Bode-Lang	The Reformation	Stephen Dunn
2015	Alicia Jo Rabins	Divinity School	Carolyn D. Wright
2017	Tyree Daye	River Hymns	Gabrielle Calvocoressi
2019	Taneum Bambrick	Vantage	Sharon Olds
2020	Chessy Normile	Great Exodus, Great Wall, Great Party	Li-Young Lee
2021	Natasha Rao	Latitude	Ada Limón
2022	Chelsea Harlan	Bright Shade	Jericho Brown
2023	Jane Huffman	Public Abstract	Dana Levin
2024	Jacob Eigen	The Twenty-First Century	Roger Reeves
2025	Itiola Jones	Bloodmercy	Nicole Sealey
2026	Ellie Black	Revelator	Dorothea Lasky

== See also ==
- American Poetry Review
- List of poetry awards
- Phoenix Poets series
- Yale Series of Younger Poets
