= Anthony McCann =

American poet

Anthony McCann is an American poet. He is the author of four collections of poetry, including Father of Noise, Moongarden, and I ♥ Your Fate. He is also the author of Gentle Reader!, a book of erasures of the English Romantics, written with fellow poets Joshua Beckman and Matthew Rohrer. He currently resides in Los Angeles where he teaches poetry at California Institute of the Arts and University of Southern California. He is also the acting Poet Laureate of Machine Project.

== Bibliography ==
- Father of Noise (Fence Books, 2003)
- Moongarden (Wave Books, 2006)
- Gentle Reader! (2007) - with Matthew Rohrer and Joshua Beckman
- I ♥ Your Fate (Wave Books, 2011)
- Thing Music (Wave Books, 2014)
- Shadowlands: Fear and Freedom at the Oregon Standoff (Bloomsbury Publishing, 2019)
