= Ernst Meister =

German poet and writer

Ernst Meister (3 September 1911 – 15 June 1979) was a German poet and writer.

Meister's poetry falls within a dark abstract landscape of existentialism, with tortured themes influenced by his experiences during World War II. In his 1976 collection of poems, Im Zeitspalt ("In Time's Rift"), Meister frankly addresses mortality and the nothingness of our existence as both mind and body decay into death. His poetry is noted for its spare brevity and difficult syntax and has been compared to the work of Romanian poet Paul Celan (1920–1970), Meister's contemporary in German letters. However, despite writing 16 collections of verse, Meister was not involved with the dominant literary and cultural elite and his works were relatively unknown during his lifetime.

== Biography ==
Ernst Meister was raised in Hagen, Germany.

He studied theology, literature, art history, and philosophy (the latter under Karl Löwith and Hans-Georg Gadamer) at various German universities before enlisting as a soldier in the Second World War. A number of war-related experiences are worked into his poems, stories, radio plays, and stage plays. His first major publication, Austellung, appeared in 1932, following which he published nothing for two decades. This period of silence ultimately gave way to the prolific last third of his life. Between 1953 and 1979, Meister produced more than 16 volumes of verse along with a number of other literary and visual works.

He received a number of awards in his lifetime, including the Annette von Droste-Hülshoff Prize in 1957, the Great Art Prize of North Rhine-Westphalia in 1963, the Petrarch Prize in 1976, and the Rainer Maria Rilke Prize for Poetry (jointly with Sarah Kirsch) in 1978. Meister was posthumously given the most prestigious award in German literature, the Georg Büchner Prize, having been informed of the honor days before his death.

He was a mentor to the poet and novelist Nicolas Born.

Poetry

- 1932: Ausstellung (trans. Exhibition)
- 1953: Unterm schwarzen Schafspelz (trans. Under Black Sheep's Clothing)
- 1954: Dem Spiegelkabinett gegenüber
- 1972: Sage vom Ganzen den Satz
- 1976: Im Zeitspalt (trans. In Time's Rift)
- 1979: Wandloser Raum
- In Time's Rift [Im Zeitspalt] , Translated by Graham Foust and Samuel Frederick, Wave Books, 2012
- Wallless Space , Translated by Graham Foust and Samuel Frederick, Wave Books, 2014
