= Sarah Phillips (novel) =

1984 book by Andrea Lee

- Author: Andrea Lee
- Language: English
- Publisher: Random House
- Publication date: October 1, 1984
- Publication place: United States
- ISBN: 1-555-53158-X

Sarah Phillips is a 1984 novel written by American writer Andrea Lee. The novel takes place in Philadelphia in the period after the civil rights movement, and centers the protagonist, Sarah Phillips, born in 1953, a daughter of a black middle-class family living in the suburbs of Philadelphia. From a first-person narrative point of view, Sarah offers chronological snapshots of her and her family's lives. She illuminates realities of middle-class Black American life, particularly around the time after the Civil Rights Movement via fictionalized stories. A later version of the book begins with a foreword by Valerie Smith. She talks about her experiences teaching this novel in her own class, and how her students did not take a liking to the protagonist, Sarah Phillips. She then contextualizes the novel, which actually began as a set of short stories debuted in The New Yorker, published during a period in which the black middle class rose in numbers. Sarah Phillips, Smith says, is in a lot of ways everything that her predecessors, both in terms of fictional characters like her and real world individuals who identified with her story, could dream of: being black and middle class, achieving success in the eyes of white America.

== Plot ==
The vast majority of the novel is Sarah's reflection and retelling of her childhood and young adult experiences. However, the first chapter, "In France", is set in the present day. Here, Sarah is traveling with three French men in Paris, including her primary lover, Henri. A lot of the content of this chapter centers the racialized romance that Sarah—a light-skinned American black woman—and Henri—a white European man—share. For example, (put quote here about the exotic women in Brazil comment Henri makes). Another thing evident from this chapter is that Sarah purposefully escaped her life back in Philadelphia (insert paraphrase or quote here), though while there, she does express a general nostalgia for her old life: "Some chemistry of air, soil, and civilization filled me with unwilling nostalgia, and I kept a sharp lookout in London for certain types of tourists: prosperous black Americans..."

The novel consists, from this first chapter on, of Sarah's reflections on her life until the present. The second chapter, taking place in the summer of 1963—recognizable because of the Civil Rights Movement—commences the flashback. Sarah takes readers back to her childhood in "New African", so they see the life and community she misses back in France. Sarah's father, Reverend James Phillips, is the pastor of New African Baptist Church in South Philadelphia, though as Sarah points out in her narration, "there was little very new or African about [it]" The church had been around since 1813, and since then, had a membership of predominantly middle-class, light-skinned Black attendees. Sarah reveals that since she and her brother, Matthew, were children, they were "dispelling" the traditions of the church, taking a secular pride in knowing how Communion was prepared. Although their father is a pastor, this was not forbidden in their household. Sarah's parents are not strict about religion for their kids, and do not force them to be super involved in the church or the religion beyond attending services. Other family members, however, disagree with that parenting, and pressure Sarah, in particular, to get more involved and get baptized. A brief physical conflict ensues between Sarah and Aunt Bessie, in which Aunt Bessie tries to physically push Sarah to get baptized after her brother Matthew had been baptized. What surprises Sarah is that her father never brings the fight up, and does not force her to attend church either. She regards this as a nonverbal, peculiar arrangement between.

In the next chapter, "Mother", Sarah focuses more on her mother, Grace Renfrew Phillips. She describes her mother's background as having "been brought up with all the fussy little airs and graces of middle-class colored girls born around the time of World War I" and having a bit of a classical education. She goes on to talk about how her mother and other little girls she grew up around aspired to marry high-status, light-skinned men. She also shares that her mother has a bit of a strange connection to the bizarre, and gets excited by strange stories. Grace also worked as a schoolteacher. Outside of that occupation, she did a lot of housekeeping for their family, such as cooking large meals. The chapter then moves into the aftermath of Judge Barber's suicide. Judge Roland Barber was both a member of the NAACP and Sarah's father's congregation. Sarah and her mom go to Judge Barber's house to pay respects to the family, bringing food, and encounter his daughter Phyllis. There is an uncomfortable air about the entire event, and even Sarah and Grace are not really sure how to speak about it beyond an odd dialogue about loss. The chapter ends with the pair returning home, and Grace cooking.

In "Gypsies", Sarah describes her black suburban, middle-class neighborhood near Philadelphia, Franklin Place, in the summer. She plays a lot with her best friend at the time, Lynn Yancy, a girl often confused as Sarah's sister because of their similar light-skin and frizzy braided hair. One day, while the two of them are hanging out, a red truck they had never seen before pulls into their neighborhood. A man and woman get out of the truck, and the woman asked Sarah if the neighborhood was all-colored, and she seems surprised that colored people are living there. She also tells the girls that they are lucky that they get to play, because her own son has to work very hard and therefore cannot play. The couple then leaves, and later that night, Sarah relays the story to her parents, who explain that the man and woman were "gypsies" who sold furniture. This sparks a particular comment from Sarah's father, who says: "Well, everybody's got… to… feel… better… than… somebody… Most of the world despises Gypsies, but a Gypsy can always look down on a Negro. Heck, that fellow was right to spit! You can dress it up with trees and big houses and people who don't stink too bad, but a nigger neighborhood is still a nigger neighborhood!" Sarah's mother yells for him to stop, and Sarah narrates that she had never heard him speak that way before. She remains scared of the "gypsies", and they never returned to Franklin Place.

"Marching" begins with a story about Sarah, her brother Matthew, her father, and her Uncle Freddy on a trip to Harlem in 1959. Her father and Uncle Freddy have a playful exchange where they say things in a distinctive voice such as "Look at the tenements and the trash! I'm awfully glad I'm not a Negro, aren't you Frederick?" Matthew then explains to Sarah "They're joking, silly -- pretending to be white" Sarah then details her upbringing specifically in terms of their father's instructions. While Reverend Phillips tells Sarah and Matthew to "say 'Negro' with near-military briskness when we spoke of ourselves in the classrooms of our Quaker school" and also talks a lot about civil rights, he also speaks about Negroes, or "we" as people who ruin neighborhoods and communities when they move in. Later, in July, Reverend Phillips and Sarah go to D.C. in 1963 to visit some family. While in a cab on its way to Union Station, soon to head home to Philadelphia, the cab driver and Reverend Phillips strike up a conversation about the upcoming march on August 28, which the reader can infer is the March on Washington. Afterwards, Sarah tells her father that she wants to attend the march, too, and he refuses. Two months later, she and Matthew watcht the march on television while under the care of Aunt Bessie, and Sarah begins to imagine her parents and her parents' friends there. Matthew declares that the march is stupid, and this begins an argument between him and Sarah, who says that the folks marching really believe in something. This concludes the chapter.

Sarah begins attending middle school in "Servant Problems". The Prescott School for Girls where she attends is a school where the teachers and students are white but all the domestic staff are black. There is a cook whom Sarah describes as having yellowish-brown skin who waves often at her and her friend, but she never returns his greeting unlike her white friend. As the first and only black student at that school during the mid-1960s, Sarah experiences social isolation with the exception of her one friend, a student named Gretchen Manning. Gretchen and Sarah share a common isolating experience, and met after both being put in Squad Six, which Sarah defines as the group for "athletic pariahs" in the school. They thought of themselves as "revolutionaries", at the school, and thus decide to break the school rule one day by climbing to the forbidden top floor. What they see is a bed with a black woman in it, whom Sarah recognizes as one of the maids at the school. Another black figure comes into view, soon to enter the room, but before they do, Sarah and Gretchen run from the floor, with Gretchen being indignant about the "conditions of the top floor", and Sarah wishing to avoid thinking about any of the black workers due to her discomfort. At some point, the two also begin to share a love of theater, and act on this by auditioning for the school play. However, when Sarah gets cast for a role for which she did not auditio—the role of Rheba, the "very black" maid of the play—she decides to not take the role and instead laughs uncontrollably. This ability to laugh, she reflects, "seems to bring [her] closer to growing up". The chapter ends with Sarah and Gretchen again seeing the black cook, and Sarah again not waving back at him, except that this time, "[she] looked seriously at him, as if he had something to teach [her]".

By the time of the chapter "Matthew and Martha", Sarah is about fourteen. Her brother, Matthew, is a first-year at Swarthmore College, and decides to visit home for a Sunday dinner with a guest: his new girlfriend, Martha Greenfield, also a first-year at Swarthmore. Martha is white, and so the family—namely Grace and Cousin Polly—is not particularly pleased. While Reverend Phillips seeks to smooth things over, Grace and Matthew get into an argument over his having a white girlfriend. Matthew argues that his mother is being unbelievable considering she sent her kids to predominantly white schools their entire lives, and then get upset when "the inevitable happens". The argument ends with Matthew and Martha taking off in their car. Later, Sarah overhears her mother and father arguing, and Grace yells at Sarah as well in frustration from the argument with Matthew.

In "The Days of the Thunderbirds", Sarah is away at Camp Grayfeather. Her two friends at the camp are Ellen and Chen-Cheu. The three of them see their camp as an integration camp, a site for racially diverse children of middle-class professional parents. Sarah even comments that the camp looks like a UNICEF poster. As further proof of their sentiments, one of the latest "integration" moves announced by the camp directors is to have Thunderbirds be at the camp for a week. Thunderbirds are a gang of black teenagers, and the director of Camp Grayfeather lectured the campers about being ambassadors and bridging a gap that society created in having the Thunderbirds stay with them for a week. Once the students arrive, a number of conflicts ensue between the two groups of kids and also between the Thunderbirds and the workers at Camp Grayfeather. Chen-Cheu makes a loud comment about some of her clothes being stolen from her bag, and the girls in the cabin fight, for example. At some point before this, Sarah and Ellen see Marvin Jones, leader of the Thunderbirds, demonstrate the Thunderbird song with some of his fellow members. This is significant because ultimately, when the students are made to leave before their week is up due to all the conflicts that had occurred, Sarah and Ellen perform their song. After having practiced the song and taught it to other campers, Sarah and about four other students stop the bus that Thunderbirds are on, soon to leave, to show them the Thunderbird song and movements as they themselves had memorized it. The chapter ends with the Thunderbirds applauding while on the bus and then the bus pulling off after Marvin Jones says that they're "sorry to leave".

"An Old Woman" centers a home visit from Grace and Sarah to Ms. Jeller's house when Sarah is sixteen years old. Ms. Jeller used to be one of Reverend Phillips most faithful church attendees before her old age relegated her to in-home care. The chapter does start off with Sarah narrating a common argument at the time between her and her mom where Sarah would ask for particular jeans and clothes, her mother would refuse to buy them and tell her that she should not be chasing the next trend, and Sarah arguing that her mom is just trying to keep her young forever and not let her grow up. When Sarah and Grace go to Ms. Jeller's house, with pound cake to give her, she is watching television with Ms. Bryant, her residential staff worker. Their conversation turns into Ms. Jeller telling a narrative of a traumatic event in her childhood when Grace asks if the woman in a photograph in the house is Ms. Jeller's mother. Ms. Jeller's mother was not very present during her childhood because she worked for white folks elsewhere, and so while growing up in Kentucky, Ms. Jeller was raised by her uncle and aunt. Ms. Jeller was raped at the age of 12 by a man in the community, and so her guardians organized a wedding between the two of them, and once the baby arrived, they got the marriage annulled. The baby got sick and died, and so by the time Ms. Jeller was 14, she had been rid of her husband and her child. After this, Sarah reflects that her mother then let her buy whatever jeans she wanted.

"Negatives" gives a first glimpse of Sarah's life at college, specifically at Harvard University. While there, Sarah reconnects with a distant family friend, and they become best friends. Curry Daniels and Sarah are very similar in that they are both light-skin and middle class. Sarah even describes his face as similar to hers, showing an even balance between black, white and "Indian blood". These similarities lead them to joke about how they should get together or get married, but that a nice colored boy and a nice colored girl might be too boring. They both already have romantic partners, both of whom are not black, and constantly make fun of each other's partners. Curry also has a knack for photography, and has been called to take numerous photos of women, including nude photos. He often tries to convince Sarah to let him take photos of her, and one day she agrees. The experience for her was very awkward, as can be seen from the faces she was making during the photos once they're developed. Though she and Curry both agree that the photos of her are not the best, he still prompts her to keep the negatives of the photos so he has a base to work off of—she still tosses them in the trash shortly after. Curry is older than Sarah, and the chapter ends with him graduating and her beginning a summer without her close friend.

In "Fine Points", Sarah and her roommate Margaret plot to engage romantically with their professor crushes at the university. Both Margaret and Sarah have a friendship where they often talk about and make fun of their partners. At this point, Sarah is invited by her professor to coffee with him and other students. She puts a lot of care into her outfit, and the professor seems surprised upon her entrance. She begins to get bored at the conversation and lose interest in the professor, although he attempts to compliment her in relation to her work in his class. When she returns to the room and tells Margaret the story, Margaret is disappointed that Sarah did not adequately make a move at the professor. Margaret herself "succeeds" with her professor crush when he gets tipsy at a function, pulls Margaret aside, and kisses her. However, Margaret, similar to Sarah, realizes she is no longer interested in the professor and is only left with awkward tension between her and the professor during their lab sessions.

"A Funeral at New African" details the death and the aftermath of Sarah's father, Reverend Phillips. Sarah's major reflection around this time in her and her family's life is how her father, and his death, started to belong to everyone else but the immediate family.

== Major characters ==
- Sarah Phillips: The protagonist. A young woman in search of herself and meaningful relationships, studying literature at Harvard University. Often surrounded exclusively by white peers. Astute and intelligent, but not always the most self-aware.
- Reverend James Phillips: Sarah's father. Patient and accepting, grounded in his spirituality.
- Grace Renfrew Phillips: Sarah's mother. Reverend's wife. Teacher at a Quaker school.
- Matthew Phillips: Sarah's poster-child-turned-rebel older brother. A smug law student who falls in love with a white Jewish girl, to his family's disapproval.

== Minor characters ==
- Henri: Sarah's primary love interest. Makes racist comments to her when in bed. Fetishizes and romanticizes the idea of Sarah.
- Aunt Lily: One of Grace's sisters and Sarah's aunts
- Aunt Bessie: Traditional aunt who tries to persuade Sarah to get baptized, sparking family tensions.
- Cousin Polly: A really old family member of Sarah's who was present and participating in the argument against Matthew dating Martha
- Lynn Yancy: Sarah's light-skinned close female friend back at Franklin Palace, the black suburban enclave at which her family lives.
- Martha Greenfield: Matthew's white Jewish girlfriend, also a first year at Swarthmore College
- Curry Daniels: One of Sarah's best friends at college, and similar to her in that he is also black, light-skinned, and middle-class.
- Margaret: Sarah's white roommate at Harvard who's a chemistry major from Wellesley, MA.

== Themes ==
Education—Sarah's education primes her to attend Harvard, live in Paris, meet European lovers, and escape the confines of her religious middle-class home life. She simultaneously seeks her parents' utter disapproval, and their unconditional worship. Boarding school, then the elite university provide her with the opportunity to escape their grasp and explore the world. This opportunity exposes the often condescending or ignorant attitudes of Sarah's peers. It gives a window into a world in which people who looked like Sarah did not, historically, have a place. This opportunity also exposes some of Sarah's privilege, and naivety.

Privilege—Sarah is a black student at an all-white boarding school. In one scene, after an audition she feels is strong, Sarah is cast as the black housemaid in the school play. It is clear to her, in that moment, how her appearance shapes some outcomes more than her talent, determination, or character. Still, Sarah has privileges many black Americans do not have at the time Lee wrote the novel. She belongs to a stable, prosperous family that educates and loves her. She receives the opportunity to improve her own future when she is invited to boarding school. Navigating the intersections of these identities thus becomes part of Sarah's coming-of-age process.

Coming of age—Although she deals with the added complications of being black in a predominantly white space, and being minimally religious in a devout household, Sarah struggles to find her identity throughout her adolescence and young adulthood like any other character. She navigates these by developing a heightened self-awareness—of her positionality in different spaces, as well as of her own strengths, weaknesses, feelings, and tendencies.

Racial identity—As a result of her educational experiences, fair complexion, family status, and class standing, Sarah has a difficult time identifying where she fits alongside her peers racially. She is black, but does not fit many of the stereotypes others attribute to her. She is black, but not too dark-skinned. She is black, and she speaks well. There is a tension between her identity and the expectations others have for her as a result of the way she looks. "It astonished me considerably", Sarah says, "to discover a world in which the lines were so clearly drawn, and in which I was the object of a relentless, discreet curiosity mingled with wariness on the part of some teachers, as if I were a small, unexploded bomb." She wants "to fit in, really fit in", with Lissa Randolph and Kemp Massie, the "rulers of the Olympic band of suntanned, gold-bangled popular girls, shimmering in their Fair Isle sweaters." These, along with other facets of her identity, cause Sarah to ask what it means to be black, to belong to the black community, and to experience blackness in different times and places.

Intersections of race and class: Sarah sometimes struggles to be seen as an equal among her white peers. At the same time, she sometimes exhibits similarly exclusive tendencies. For example, she initially ignores the black cook at school, thinking she is too good for him. Her church communities demonstrates some of the same class tensions. Many well-off black families drive into South Philly to go to Sunday morning services. But then they drive expensive cars back out to the suburbs, while poorer black families are left to live in the "inner-city". She lives in an "earnest, prosperous black family in which Civil Rights and concern for the underprivileged are served up".

Family approval—Sarah reminisces on her friendship with Curry, the son, also studying at Harvard, of her mom's distant cousin and childhood best friend. She says they "both harbored ill-conceived ideals of leading lives that would almost geometrically contravene anything of which our parents would approve".

Memory:

Intimacy—Sarah finds intimacy challenging in a number of the stories contained in Sarah Phillips. She sometimes struggles to identify the lines between friendship and romance (with Curry Daniels), or the difference between passionate romance and abusive relationship behavior.

== Critical reception ==
While Andrea Lee's first novel, Russian Journal, was nominated for a National Book Award for Nonfiction, Sarah Phillips received no awards. It has, however, become the topic of academic literature, journal articles, and much classroom conversation. Both the popular reception to the novel and academic opinions vary widely. Some examples are included below:

In a November 1984 review in The New York Times, novelist Susan Richards Shreve described Sarah Phillips as an "unsentimental autobiography". She continued, it "is clear that Miss Lee intended her to be a child of the civil rights movement, representative of a new black woman, educated, sassy, worldly, harshly critical, somewhat self- deprecating and bound for a kind of glory".

Invoking the philosophies of W.E.B. DuBois and William Faulkner, Don N. Enomoto argued, in a 1999 Journal article published by MELUS, Sarah Phillips is ideal material for exploring the tensions between "theory and tradition". He wrote that Sarah Phillips, the character, fights "to liberate herself from restrictive conditions while constructing a new identity that better reflects her own subjective experience of reality".

In March, 1985, a student writer for The Harvard Crimson said Sarah Phillips is "really a collection of finely shaped autobiographical short stories".

Adrienne McCormick, Dean of the College of Arts and Sciences at Winthrop University, said in a 2004 essay published by the Johns Hopkins University Press that Sarah Phillips "raises questions about the middle class black woman's ability to recognize, let alone resist, racism and sexism as they intersect with class privilege".

In a January 1985 Los Angeles Times review, Lola D. Gillebaard said "Sarah is not consciously clashing with issues of history in these chapters, but author Lee has clearly made her a child of the educated, cheeky, cosmopolitan, critical and bound for achievement".

This variety in response to, and interpretation of, Sarah Phillips, is part of what Valerie Smith discusses in her introduction to the novel, as mentioned earlier.
