= Dennis vanEngelsdorp =

American entomologist

- Education: Doctor of Philosophy
- Alma mater: Pennsylvania State University University of Guelph
- Known for: Colony collapse disorder | Honey bee | Varroa destructor
- Scientific career
- Workplaces: University of Maryland

Dennis vanEngelsdorp is a professor of entomology in the College of Computer, Mathematical, and Natural Sciences and the College of Agriculture and Natural Resources at the University of Maryland, College Park. He was the Chief Scientist for the Bee Informed Partnership and has been involved in a number of studies aimed at understanding colony collapse disorder. VanEngelsdorp was formerly the chief apiarist for Pennsylvania. He was married to H. G. Carrillo, a professor of English at George Washington University, until Carrillo's death of COVID-19 in April 2020.

== Education ==
- 2011 - Doctorate of Philosophy. The Pennsylvania State University, University Park, PA, USA
- 1995 - Master of Science in Environmental Biology. University of Guelph, Guelph, Ontario, Canada
- 1992 - Bachelor of Science in Agriculture. University of Guelph, Guelph, Ontario, Canada

== Awards ==
- 2010 Roger A. Morse Outstanding teaching/Extension Service/Regulatory Award
- 2009 Fine Fellowship Scholarship for Gigapixel Imagery for Science Outreach
