= Atsuro Riley =

American writer

- Born: South Carolina, United States
- Occupation: Writer
- Writing career
- Language: English
- Genre: Poetry
- Notable works: Romey's Order, Heard-Hoard

Atsuro Riley is an American writer.

Riley is the author of the poetry collections Heard-Hoard (University of Chicago Press, 2021) and Romey's Order (University of Chicago Press, 2010).

In 2023, Riley was named a Guggenheim Foundation Fellow and winner of the Arts and Letters Award in Literature from the American Academy of Arts and Letters.

Heard-Hoard was the winner of the Alice Fay di Castagnola Award from the Poetry Society of America and a finalist for the PEN/Voelcker Poetry Award; it was named a 'Best Book of 2021' by The Boston Globe and a 'Top 10 Book of 2021' by Bookworm.

Romey's Order received the Whiting Award, the Kate Tufts Discovery Award, The Believer Poetry Award, and the Witter Bynner Award from the Library of Congress. Riley's work has been awarded the Lannan Foundation Literary Fellowship, the Pushcart Prize, the Wood Prize from Poetry magazine, and a National Endowment for the Arts Literature Fellowship.

Poems appear in A Public Space, Poetry (magazine), The Kenyon Review, McSweeney's, The Believer, The Threepenny Review, The New Republic, Free Verse Journal, Riddle Fence (Canada), Southern Cultures, The Poetry Review (UK), Poetry International.

Riley's poetry has been anthologized in The Mind Has Cliffs of Fall: Poems at the Extremes of Feeling, ed. Robert Pinsky (W.W. Norton), The Open Door: One Hundred Poems, One Hundred Years of Poetry Magazine, Poems of the American South (Everyman's Library-Knopf),The Oxford Anthology of Contemporary American Poetry (Oxford University Press), The McSweeney's Book of Poets Picking Poets (McSweeney's), Poems From Far and Wide (McSweeney's), Vinegar and Char (University of Georgia Press), Gracious (Texas Tech University Press), Home: 100 Poems (Yale University Press).

Brought up in the South Carolina lowcountry, Atsuro Riley lives in San Francisco.

== Awards ==
- Guggenheim Foundation Fellowship, John Simon Guggenheim Memorial Foundation
- Arts and Letters Award in Literature, American Academy of Arts and Letters
- Alice Fay di Castagnola Award, Poetry Society of America
- PEN/Voelcker Award for Poetry (finalist), PEN America
- Whiting Award
- Kate Tufts Discovery Award
- The Believer Poetry Award
- Lannan Literary Fellowship, Lannan Foundation
- Witter Bynner Fellowship, Library of Congress
- Pushcart Prize
- J. Howard and Barbara M.J. Wood Prize, Poetry
- National Endowment for the Arts Literature Fellowship

== Works ==
- Heard-Hoard. University of Chicago Press. 2021.
- Romey's Order. University of Chicago Press. 2010.

== Anthologies & Critical Volumes ==
- The Oxford Anthology of Contemporary American Poetry (Oxford University Press)
- The Open Door: One Hundred Poems, One Hundred Years of Poetry Magazine (University of Chicago Press)
- The Mind Has Cliffs of Fall: Poems at the Extremes of Feeling— ed. Robert Pinsky (W.W. Norton)
- Poems of the American South (Everyman's Library-Knopf)
- The McSweeney's Book of Poets Picking Poets (McSweeney's)
- Poems From Far and Wide (McSweeney's)
- Vinegar and Char (University of Georgia Press)
- Radical as Reality: Form and Freedom in American Poetry— by Peter Campion (University of Chicago Press)
- The Fate of Difficulty in the Poetry of Our Time— ed. Charles Altieri & Nicholas Nace (Northwestern University Press)
- Gracious: Poems from the 21st Century South— ed. John Poch (Texas Tech University Press)
- Home: 100 Poems— ed. Christian Wiman (Yale University Press)

== Reviews/Interviews ==
HEARD-HOARD

- Peter Campion (November 2021). "Review: The Adroit Journal".
- Carol Moldaw (August 2022). "Review: Lana Turner Journal" (PDF).
- Meg Schoerke (May 2022). "Review: The Hudson Review".
- Julian Gewirtz (January 2022). "Review: World Literature Today".
- Patrick Davis (August 2023). "Review: Harvard Review".
- Dan Beachy-Quick (February 2022). "Review: Colorado Review".
- Emily Pérez (July 2022). "Review: Georgia Review--Sounding and Resounding: The Immersive Poetry of Atsuro Riley".
- Michael Silverblatt, KCRW (December 2021). "BOOKWORM'S Top 10 Books of 2021".
- Christopher Spaide (December 2021). "BOSTON GLOBE'S Best Books of 2021".
- Malcolm Young, Dean of Grace Cathedral San Francisco (November 2021). "Interview: THE FORUM".
- Michael Silverblatt (October 2021). "Review + Interview: BOOKWORM".
- Jesse Nathan (September 2021). "Review + Interview: McSweeney's".
- Publishers Weekly (September 2021). "Review: Publishers Weekly".
- David Biespiel (November 2021). "Interview: Portland Book Festival".
- Katherine Litwin (December 2022). "Review: 'Library Book Picks'". The Poetry Foundation.
- Maya C. Popa (November 2021). "Review: 'The Poet's Nightstand'". Poetry Society of America.
- David Woo (October 2021). "Review: Harriet—The Poetry Foundation".

ROMEY'S ORDER

- Peter Campion (May 2010). "Rhetoric, Music, America: POETRY magazine review". POETRY.
- The Believer (May 2011). "The Believer Poetry Award citation". The Believer.
- Dominic Luxford (October 2010). "The Believer Review". The Believer.
- Dana Jennings (October 18, 2010). "The Sting of Salt Air, Old Loves and Honey Bees". The New York Times.
- Emily Pérez (July 2022). "Review: Georgia Review--Sounding and Resounding: The Immersive Poetry of Atsuro Riley".
- Alex Lemon (December 26, 2010). "Book reviews: Romey's Order, by Atsuro Riley, and Ideal Cities, by Erika Meitner". The Dallas Morning News.
- Jon Thompson (Winter 2010–2011). "Going Home". Free Verse.
- Jim Schley (August 15, 2010). "Debut Dazzles with Originality". Pittsburgh Post-Gazette. Archived from the original on August 20, 2010.
