= Bough Down =

2013 poetry collection by Karen Green

- Author: Karen Green
- Language: English
- Published: 2013
- Publisher: Siglio Press
- Pages: 186
- ISBN: 9781938221019

Bough Down is a collection of poetry and small mixed media collages, created by Karen Green. It was published in 2013 and won the Believer Poetry Award the same year. In her book, Green explores how contradictory emotions can coexist and processes these sentiments through her prose and art.

== Background ==
Green is known for a variety of exhibitions, such as The Forgiveness Machine, an interactive display from 2009, and Tiny Stampede, a collection of collages from 2011. Alongside Bough Down, Green is also the author of Voices from La Frontera: Pioneer Women from the Big Bend Tell Their Stories (2002) and Frail Sister (2018).

Green lives in Northern California.

Green was married to American author David Foster Wallace in 2004 until his death of suicide in 2008. Although his name is never mentioned in Bough Down, Green's vulnerable words and dissection of grief stem from this loss.

== Book's content ==
=== Organization ===
Bough Down's order is a reflection of the confusion and imbrication of emotions that accompany the loss of a loved one. There are stretches of pages with a paragraph or two of verse, surrounded by large margins and empty space. These are followed by a randomly placed blank page or a postage-sized print of a collage on a single page. The only method of organization is chronologically, as the memories she writes about progress by month and through the evolution of her emotions. Many of her poems are written about a specific person. These people include a variety of characters, such as doctors, the jazz lady, Green's relatives, pets, and even Green herself. These verses vary in content; some are memories, some are comparable to a diary of her thoughts, and others are a combination of the two. Although many of the themes are very serious, some lines are filled with humor, easing the tension.

=== Collages ===
The small collages printed throughout the book are a part of Green's collection, Tiny Stampede. This series was displayed in an exhibition in 2011 in Pasadena, California. She combines snippets of sentences, printed images, inked fingerprints, pieces of a postage stamp collecting book, pencils shavings, her own drawings and watercolors, and other mediums. The mix of media is a form of found poetry, which uses fragments of sentences and random words from other sources to create a new unified work. Green used this process as an escape, a way of coping with trauma and grounding herself.

Each printed image in the book is relatively small as well, ranging between 0.5 inches and 3.5 inches in length and width. Green has stated that her choice in size is reflective of how minuscule and lost she felt during this time in her life. The mediums, specific scraps, and colors that she chose to use in each piece are representative of different parts of herself. The inked fingerprints point to her sense of identity as she becomes part of the collective of widows. The repetitive presence of faces and human-like forms is also illustrative of her exploration of selfhood. Green uses color and the names of colors in her work to represent what she calls "unimaginables", a list of her fears and faiths, which she chose to organize by color. The specific meaning behind each color is unknown, but they are used to express the emotions attached to this list. Some images included also depict particular memories and Green's raw self reflection associated with them.

== Publication ==
Bough Down was published by Siglio Press in 2013 and is on its third printing.

== Awards and recognition ==
In 2013, the year of its publication, Green won the Believer Poetry Award for Bough Down.

Bough Down has been compared to Anne Carson's Nox (2010) and Joan Didion's The Year of Magical Thinking (2005) in the ways she explores her grief through prose and visual art.
