= Andrea Lee (author) =

American writer

- Born: 1953 (age 72–73); Philadelphia, Pennsylvania, U.S.
- Education: The Baldwin School; Radcliffe College
- Occupation: Author
- Children: 2

Andrea Lee (born 1953) is an American-born author of novels, short fiction, and memoirs. Her stories are often international in setting and explore questions of race and culture, as well as ideas surrounding national identity and foreignness.

== Early life ==
Andrea Lee was born in Philadelphia, Pennsylvania in 1953, as the youngest of three children in a middle-class family; her father was a Baptist minister and her mother was an elementary school teacher. Lee was born into an African American family, but quickly became surrounded by many white people which influenced her view of herself and later shaped her works. Lee was educated at the private Baldwin School in Bryn Mawr.

After earning a bachelor's degree and a master's degree in English from Harvard University's Radcliffe College, Lee pursued her dream to live in Europe and moved to Russia for a year (1978–79) with her first husband. She lived in the Soviet Union and kept a diary of observations of the people and culture, and drew from that for her first book, a memoir titled Russian Journal published in 1981. The memoir was born from Lee's empathetic and insightful observations of those around her. This memoir was nominated for a National Book Award and won the Jean Stein Award from the American Academy and Institute of Arts and Letters.

== Career ==
After returning to the United States, Lee worked for several years as a staff writer on The New Yorker before moving on to her own freelance work. She is now a contract writer for The New Yorker. She has also been featured in Gourmet, Allure, W, House & Garden, and the Oxford American The New York Times Magazine, The New York Times Book Review, Vogue, Time, The Oxford American, as well as the textbook Elements of Literature.

Her short stories have been anthologized, including "Winter Barley" in The Best American Short Stories 1993, "Brothers and Sisters Around the World" in The Best American Short Stories 2001, and "Anthropology" in The New Granta Book of the American Short Story (2007, edited by Richard Ford).

Her first novel, Sarah Phillips, was published in 1984. It has semi-autobiographical elements, featuring an African-American woman from Philadelphia, with a father who is a minister and a mother who is an elementary school teacher. The protagonist marries a white man who she met at Harvard, and travels with him to Russia. The novel grapples with the same issues of identity and self that Lee herself dealt with throughout her lifetime. Themes of alienation and loneliness are prominent as the protagonist struggles to grapple with her own black identity while trying to fit in to the prominent white culture.

Her collection of short stories, Interesting Women: Stories (2001), featured African-American women abroad, especially in Italy. She has explored points of view of educated young women from privileged backgrounds, negotiating European societies and questions of race and class.

Her novel Lost Hearts in Italy: A Novel (2006), also featured Americans in Europe.

Lee spoke in an interview and said that, "What I like to investigate when I write is what people dream about. What fascinates me is fantasy, the dream of being away, the state of being foreign, of being apart." Andrea Lee's work aims to combine adventure and imaginative pieces while grappling with complex topics of race, gender, class, and identity in the modern world. Her writing also highlights the contrasts in these topics between countries around the world.

== Personal life ==
Lee has lived in Turin, Italy since 1992 with her Italian husband and their two children.

== Bibliography ==
=== Novels ===
- Sarah Phillips (novel) 1984
- Lost Hearts in Italy: A Novel, 2006
- Red Island House: A Novel, 2021

=== Short fiction ===
Collections

- Interesting Women: Stories, 2002 (translated into Italian and published in Italy)

Stories (Note: Short stories unless otherwise noted.)

Title	Year	First published	Reprinted/collected	Notes
Anthropology	2002			
The Children	2019	The New Yorker (June 10 & 17, 2019)	The Best American Short Stories 2020	
The rivals	2021	Lee, Andrea (January 4–11, 2021). "The rivals". The New Yorker. 96 (43): 60–68.		

=== Non-fiction ===
- Russian Journal, 1981 (Note: Nominated for a National Book Award for Nonfiction.)

———————
