= Porter Shreve =

American novelist

Porter Shreve is an American author and professor of English and Creative Writing. He is the son of writer Susan Shreve.

== Life ==
He graduated from the University of Michigan Creative Writing MFA Program in 1998, where he studied with Charles Baxter and Lorrie Moore. He has taught at several American universities, including the University of Michigan, the University of Oregon, the University of North Carolina at Greensboro, Purdue University, the University of San Francisco, and the University of Wisconsin-Madison, where he is Professor of English and Director of Creative Writing.

Shreve married fellow writer Beth Nguyen (then Bich Minh Nguyen) in 2002. Nguyen stated she was divorced in 2023.

== Career ==
Shreve's first novel, The Obituary Writer, about a young journalist in 1989 St. Louis who gets in over his head when a young widow asks him to pursue her story, was a 2000 New York Times Notable Book, a Book Sense Pick, and a Borders Original Voices selection. The New York Times called the novel "an involving and sneakily touching story whose twists feel less like the conventions of a genre than the convolutions of a heart—any heart."

Shreve's second novel, Drives Like a Dream, about an empty nest mother in Detroit who hatches a scheme to lure her far-flung children home, was a 2005 Chicago Tribune Book of the Year, a People "Great Reads" Selection, and a Britannica Book of the Year. The Washington Post called Drives Like a Dream “a beautiful novel, carefully put together, full of charming secondary characters, and charitable to all.”

Shreve's third novel, When the White House Was Ours, was published during the 2008 presidential campaign and touches upon previous election years, including 2000 and 1976. The Washington Post wrote, "Coming-of-age tales that hark back to lovable, quaint times all too often cover the landscape and the characters with a thick dusting of powdered sugar. But Shreve avoids sentimental sludge with the masterly voice of Daniel, the anxious boy historian who tries to keep order in his fractured life by soberly documenting it, zany detail by zany detail. As we recover from our own sugar high of the 2008 election, 'When the White House Was Ours' offers a perfect antidote. Turn off the TV pundits, turn down the thermostat, and slip on a comfy cardigan."

Shreve's fourth novel, The End of the Book, was published in 2014 and named a San Francisco Chronicle Book of the Year. It is the story of an aspiring contemporary novelist who is writing a sequel to a forgotten classic, Sherwood Anderson's Winesburg, Ohio, and goes back and forth in time between the turn of the century and present-day Chicago. The Washington Post wrote, "Anderson’s classic is the linchpin holding together the two halves of Porter Shreve’s excellent new novel, The End of the Book. Winesburg, Ohio was recognized in its day as a piercing work of literature, and The End of the Book warrants the same. This is entertaining, insightful fiction, more proof that it’s not over yet."

Shreve has also co-edited three essay anthologies with his mother, Susan Shreve: Outside the Law; How We Want to Live; and Tales Out of School; and three textbook anthologies with Bich Minh Nguyen.

== Bibliography ==
=== Novels ===
- The Obituary Writer (2000)
- Drives Like a Dream (2005)
- When the White House Was Ours (2008)
- The End of the Book (2014)

=== Anthologies ===
- Outside the Law: Narratives on Justice in America (1997)
- How We Want to Live (1998)
- Tales Out of School: Contemporary Writers on Their Student Years (2000)
- The Contemporary American Short Story (2003)
- Contemporary Creative Nonfiction: I & Eye (2004)
- 30/30: Thirty American Stories from the Last Thirty Years (2005)
