= PEN/Faulkner Foundation =

American fiction award foundation formed in 1980

- Formation: 1980
- Founder: Mary Lee Settle
- Purpose: Charitable arts foundation
- Headquarters: United States
- Official language: English
- Website: penfaulkner.org

The PEN/Faulkner Foundation (est. 1980) is an independent charitable arts foundation that supports the art of fiction and encourages readers of all ages. It accomplishes this through a number of programs, including its flagship PEN/Faulkner Award for Fiction, the PEN/Malamud Award for short fiction, and a number of educational and public literary programs. Since 1983 the Foundation's administration has been located in Washington, D.C.. The Foundation was established in 1980 by National Book Award winner Mary Lee Settle. Novelist Robert Stone served as the Chairman of the PEN/Faulkner Board of Directors for over thirty years beginning in 1982.

== History ==
=== Early years ===
After the novel Blood Tie won the National Book Award in 1978, author Mary Lee Settle was asked to judge the 1979 National Book Awards. When the award went to an obscure book Going After Cacciato by Tim O'Brien and not the bestseller The World According to Garp by John Irving, the rules were changed. Settle upset by the rule changes, envisioned a book award that "would be judged by writers, not by industry insiders, and no favoritism would be granted to bestselling authors." A New York Times article from 1981 writes that "PEN voted a boycott of the American Book Awards, on the ground that they were 'too commercial'". In 1980 along with friends, Settle set up a competing organization for American fiction that was named PEN/Faulkner. PEN stood for "Poets", "Editors" and "Novelists". Faulkner was chosen in honor of William Faulkner who was an inspiration to Settle.

The PEN/Faulkner Award winner receives a prize of $15,000, and each of the four runner-ups receives $5,000. The first award in 1981 went to How German Is It written by Walter Abish. The ceremony was originally held at the University of Virginia in Charlottesville, Virginia.

Settle's vision was for the organization to encourage young writers by having published authors visit and mentor students in the school system. Creating '"a community of writers' who would encourage one other ... and make a larger impact on American life". The organization began with high schools in the Washington D.C. area and eventually expanded to middle and elementary schools as well. Settle remained on the board until her death in 2005.

In 1982, Robert Stone (who had been a PEN/Faulkner nominee in 1981), Norman Mailer and Peter Taylor were the featured speakers for the Foundation's very first fundraising event, tickets selling for $25 a person. Stone served as Chairman for over thirty years, co-chairing with Susan Shreve in the last years of his tenure.

== Awards ==
The Foundation gives four awards:

=== PEN/Faulkner Award for Fiction ===
The first award was given in 1981 to How German Is It by Walter Abish. Judges are chosen by the Board of Directors in order to remove "commercial influence". The judges select ten books from a submission process that may include over 400 novels submitted by publishers, authors and literary agents. Judges then narrow the longlist down to five. One of those five is selected as the "'first among equals", and the author receives $15,000. Authors of the other four finalists receive $5,000. The award is presented at the Martin Luther King, Jr. Memorial Library in Washington D. C..

According to The Washington Post literary critic Ron Charles, the 2017 PEN/Faulkner Awards seemed to be setting a new standard for diversity in literature awards. The short list of nominees included Viet Dinh, Louise Erdrich, Garth Greenwell, Imbolo Mbue and Sunil Yapa. Charles wrote, "These writers are the United States, and they tell this country's experience with a dazzling range of voices and styles", adding that four of the finalists were debut novelists creating a "new vibrancy of American fiction". These five were selected from among "almost 500 works of fiction by American authors published in the United States during 2016." Winners are notified in advance of the award ceremony which in May 2017 was held at the Folger Shakespeare Library with dinner, followed by each of the five authors reading from their novels.

In order to be more inclusive, in 2018 the PEN/Faulkner board changed the American citizenship requirement to include "'American permanent residents and Green Card holders'". According to Shahenda Helmy, the change was intended to reflect "'the true landscape of American fiction'".

=== PEN/Bernard and Ann Malamud Award ===
The PEN/Bernard and Ann Malamud Award for Excellence in the Short Story was named for Bernard and Ann Malamud. Bernard Malamud was an award-winning author. The award was established in 1988. It is presented "to a writer who demonstrates dedication to the craft of the short story and whose stories are exceptionally well-realized". Judges are selected by members of the Board of Directors. Outside submissions are not allowed. Judges rely on a small advisory board of literary leaders and their own knowledge of the field. The first PEN/Malamud Award was given to John Updike.

=== PEN/Hemingway Award for Debut Novel ===
The PEN/Hemingway Award for Debut Novel has been awarded since 1976.

=== PEN/Faulkner Literary Champion ===
The PEN/Faulkner Literary Champion commendation was established in 2020 at the 40th anniversary of the PEN/Faulkner Foundation. It was established "in recognition of devoted literary advocacy and a commitment to inspiring new generations of readers and writers". Past winners have included LeVar Burton (2021), Oprah Winfrey (2022), Terry Gross (2023), David Baldacci (2024) and Carla Hayden (2025).

== Other programs ==
- Writers in Schools - according to PEN/Faulkner website, the foundation provides free books and visits by authors to thousands of students in the Washington D.C. area.
- Writing Workshops
- Writers in Residence
- Nuestras Voces - founded by H.G. Carrillo - is an educational program that brings Latinx authors into Washington D.C. public schools.
- Lisa Page Literary Education Fellowship (begun in 2024) - Lisa Page was a "former long-time PEN/Faulkner board member"

== Notable people ==
=== Chairman of the Board of Directors ===
- Robert Stone - Chairman of the Board of Directors (1982 - 2013)
- Robert Stone and Susan Shreve - co-Chairs of the Board of Directors
- H.G. Carrillo - Chair of the Board of Directors
- Dolen Perkins-Valdez

=== Executive Director ===
- Emma Snyder - Executive Director
- Matt Burriesci
- Janice Delaney
- Gwydion Suilebhan - Executive Director (2019 - current)

=== Board President ===
- Katherine Boone (current)
- Susan Keselenko Coll
- Tracy McGillivary
- Ginny Grenham
- Stephen Goodwin - Board President

== See also ==
- List of PEN literary awards
