= Karen Green (artist) =

American artist (born 1960)

- Born: 1960 (age 65–66)
- Notable work: Bough Down, The Forgiveness Machine
- Spouse: David Foster Wallace (m. 2004; died 2008)
- Awards: Believer Poetry Award

Karen L. Green (born 1960) is an American artist. Her book Bough Down won the Believer Poetry Award.

She was married to author David Foster Wallace from 2004 until his death in 2008. A year after Wallace's death, Green displayed a piece called The Forgiveness Machine at a gallery in Pasadena near the Los Angeles suburb of Claremont, where she and Wallace had lived in the four years they had been married. For The Guardian, she described the piece as "The idea was that you wrote down the thing that you wanted to forgive, or to be forgiven for, and a vacuum sucked your piece of paper in one end. At the other it was shredded, and hey presto."

== Books ==
- Voices from La Frontera: Pioneer Women from the Big Bend Tell Their Stories (2002)
- Bough Down (2013)
- Frail Sister (2018)
