= H. G. Carrillo =

American writer (1960–2020)

- Born: Herman Glenn Caroll; April 26, 1960; Detroit, Michigan, U.S.
- Died: April 20, 2020 (aged 59); Washington, D.C., U.S.
- Other names: H. G. Carrillo; Hache
- Education: DePaul University; Cornell University
- Occupations: Novelist; academic
- Years active: 2004–2020
- Spouse: Dennis vanEngelsdorp (m. 2015)

H. G. Carrillo (born Herman Glenn Carroll; April 26, 1960 – April 20, 2020) was an American fiction writer and academic. In the 1990s, he began writing as "H. G. Carrillo" and he eventually adopted that identity in his private life as well. Carroll constructed a false claim that he was a Cuban immigrant who had left Cuba with his family at the age of seven. In fact, he had no ties to Cuba. Carroll wrote frequently about the Cuban immigrant experience in the United States, including in his only novel, Loosing My Espanish (2004). He was an assistant professor of English at George Washington University from 2007 to 2013, and was later chair of the PEN/Faulkner Foundation.

Carroll kept his true identity hidden from those close to him, including his husband, whom he married in 2015. Only after his death in April 2020 did the true details of his life become publicly known after members of his family revealed them.

== Background ==
Herman Glenn Carroll was born on April 26, 1960, in Detroit to educated African American parents who had themselves been born and raised in Michigan. By the 1980s, he had moved to Chicago. After his partner died of complications related to AIDS in 1988, he began writing. During this period, he began going by the name "Hermán G. Carrillo" and eventually "Hache" ("H" in Spanish). In his public persona, he fabricated a storyline in which he was born in Santiago de Cuba, in 1960, emigrated with his family to Spain at the age of seven, and then emigrated to the Midwest. He also claimed to have been a "widely-traveled" child pianist who was "something of a prodigy"; this assertion was also revealed to be false after his death.

Carroll established a pattern of lying about his life by early adulthood. He would frequently fabricate his background to romantic partners and friends, variously claiming that he had attended or graduated from schools he was never admitted to, that he had worked as a sportswriter for a Detroit newspaper and written stories for The New Yorker, or that he had a child with a French woman, and that their child went on to attend the Juilliard School. One former partner said, "Herman walked the planet lying, and he might occasionally tell the truth. It wasn't malicious – it was a compulsion".

In or around 1989, Carroll was hired to manage a call center for HBO, where he remained for the following six years. The exact reason for his departure was unclear, though he may have been dismissed after his employers discovered he did not have a bachelor's degree, as he had claimed. In 1995, he enrolled at DePaul University in Chicago, where he received his B.A. in Spanish and English in 2000. It was during this time that he began constructing the H. G. Carrillo persona. In 2003, he legally changed his last name to Carrillo, and he went on to receive an MFA from Cornell University in 2007.

Carroll was married to entomologist Dennis vanEngelsdorp, and they lived in the Washington, D.C. suburb of Berwyn Heights, Maryland. He had maintained his fabrications throughout his personal life and ensured that his husband never met his family. VanEngelsdorp later remarked that "the only true things he ever told me about his life was his birthday and the fact that he was Catholic".

== Career ==
Using the name Herman Carrillo, Carroll worked as an assistant professor of English at George Washington University. He started teaching at the university level after 2007. He was also the chairman of the PEN/Faulkner Foundation. Carroll's works—published under the Carrillo name—have appeared in several publications, including The Kenyon Review, Conjunctions, The Iowa Review, Glimmer Train, Ninth Letter, and Slice. He was popular with his students, and believed he would receive academic tenure, but he left the faculty in 2013 after the university declined to renew his contract due to a lack of publishing activity. He was then hired by the PEN/Faulkner Foundation, and eventually became its chairman.

=== Loosing My Espanish ===
Carroll's only novel, Loosing My Espanish (Pantheon, 2004), addresses the complexities of Latino immigration, religiously associated education, homosexuality, and lower-class struggles from a Cuban immigrant's perspective. The novel was published under the Carrillo name. Wendy Gimbel at The Washington Post wrote a lengthy review of the novel, saying this about Carroll's writing style:

In this complexly structured novel, Oscar's narrative moves backward and forward, alternating between the present and historical time. If one considers the present moment as a force field that holds together all the disparate elements in the book, a cohesive tale emerges from a seemingly disorderly series of scenes.

— Gimbel, 2005

=== Awards ===
As H. G. Carrillo, Carroll received the Arthur Lynn Andrew Prize for Best Fiction in 2001 and 2003 as well as the Iowa Award in 2004. He received several fellowships and grants, including a Sage Fellowship, a Provost's Fellowship, and a Newberry Library Research Grant. He earned the 2001 Glimmer Train Fiction Open Prize and was named the 2002 Alan Collins Scholar for Fiction.

== Death and aftermath ==
Carroll was undergoing treatment for prostate cancer in the last months of his life. The illness and the severe side effects of his medication caused a steep decline in his health. In April 2020, he collapsed at his home and was admitted to a hospital in Washington, D.C., during the COVID-19 pandemic. While there, he contracted COVID-19, and he died from the disease on April 20, six days before his 60th birthday.

After the publication of an obituary in The Washington Post, which reported on Carroll's life as he had misrepresented it, relatives in Michigan realized that he had fabricated his identity and informed Carroll's husband and the newspaper accordingly. The discovery of Carroll's fabrication was a shocking surprise to his colleagues as well as his close friends. Carroll's family had varied reactions: his sister said that he was "very talented" but "always eccentric", though she added that their mother, who died in 2015, had been aware of his fabrications and was "really hurt by the whole façade". Similarly, while many friends and former students expressed resentment towards Carroll after learning of his deceit, vanEngelsdorp felt more ambivalent.

Cuban Americans' reactions appear to reflect that they had been largely unaware of Carroll. In Miami, the epicenter of the Cuban diaspora, no major newspaper reported Carroll's death nor the revelations about his true identity. Following Carroll's death, several Cuban American writers read some of his writings and found errors in his Spanish, including both spelling errors and the use of non-Cuban Spanish, such as the slang word pinche (common only in Mexico). F. Lennox Campello wrote that Carroll's stories did not reflect the distinctive Cuban immigrant experience, but were instead "a fabricated blending of many Latin American immigration stories, a healthy dose of Hollywood stereotypes, and a disturbing amount of Mexican-flavored dialect slang".

On March 24, 2023, The New Yorker Radio Hour released an episode about the aftermath of Carroll's death, including interviews with his husband and family, as well as former mentor Helena Maria Viramontes.

== Published works ==
=== Books ===
- Loosing My Espanish (2004)

=== Short stories ===
- "Luna" (2020)
- "Contracorriente" (2016)
- "Gavage" (2013)
- "Twilight of the Small Havanas" (2010)
- "Andalúcia" (2008/2009)
- "Co-Sleeper" (2008)
- "Pornografía" (2007)
- "Elizabeth" (2006)
- "The Santiago Boy" (2006)
- "Caridad" (2005)
- "Cosas" (2004)
- "Abejas Rubias" (2004)

=== Essays ===
- "Splaining Yourself" (2014)
- ""Who Knew Desi Arnaz Wasn't White?" An Essay" (2007)
- "¿Quién se hubiera imaginado que Desi Arnaz no era blanco?" (2007)

== See also ==
- Fake memoir
- List of impostors
- Literary forgery
- Racial misrepresentation
- Jessica Krug, another former professor at the George Washington University known to have fabricated a Latino identity
