= Gwydion Suilebhan =

- Born: 1968 (age 57–58); Baltimore, Maryland, U.S.
- Education: Johns Hopkins University
- Occupations: playwright; essayist; theater blogger; cultural critic; arts advocate
- Writing career
- Notable work: Transmission
- Website: suilebhan.com

Gwydion Suilebhan (born 1968) is an American playwright, essayist, cultural critic, and arts advocate who serves as executive director of the PEN/Faulkner Foundation as well as the Project Director of the New Play Exchange for the National New Play Network (NNPN).

== Early life and education ==
Gwydion Suilebhan was born in Baltimore, Maryland, in 1968.

Suilebhan received a Bachelor of Arts in writing from Northwestern University, and an M.A. degree in poetry from the Johns Hopkins Writing Seminars.

== Career ==
In his early career, Suilebhan spent time in the publishing, education, and journalism sectors.

Suilebhan has served as Poetry Editor at Barrelhouse Magazine and director of brand and marketing for Woolly Mammoth Theatre Company.

Since 2019, he has held the position of executive director of the PEN/Faulkner Foundation in 2019, and since 2012, has served as Project Director of the New Play Exchange for the NNPN.

He has served as a member of various organizations including the Board of Governors for theatreWashington (2012); Dramatists Guild Council (2017–20); and the Welders playwrights collective, of which he was also co-founder.

Suilebhan has written several plays such as Abstract Nude, The Butcher, Let X, Reals, and Transmission. His works have been performed at Center Stage, Ensemble Studio Theatre, Forum Theatre, Gulfshore Playhouse, Source Theater Festival, Theater Alliance, Theater J, and Workshop Theater.

As a communications and technology strategist, he has worked with Centers for Medicare and Medicaid Services, Chronicle of Higher Education, Council on Foreign Relations, Discovery Communications, Dramatists Guild, Drug Policy Alliance, National Academies, National Wildlife Federation, Peace Corps, Playwrights' Center, Toshiba, US News & World Report, U.S. State Department, XM Radio, and Zipcar.

Suilebhan has spoken at Americans for the Arts, Association of Performing Arts Services Organizations, CityWrights, Dramatists Guild National Conference, LMDA conference, South by Southwest, TCG conference, TEDxMichigan Avenue, and TEDxWDC.

His articles have appeared in 2am Theatre, 3 Quarks Daily, Adaptistration, Baltimore Sun, The Dramatist, HowlRound, JewThink Moment, Salon, The 74, and USA Today.

== Awards and honors ==
- 2009, Finalist, Outstanding Emerging Artist, DC Mayor's Arts Awards
- 2015, Woolly Mammoth posters, Graphis Award
- 2016, The Welders, Winner, John Aniello Award for Outstanding Emerging Theater Company at the Helen Hayes Awards
- 2017, Transmission, Nominated, Helen Hayes Award
- Individual Artist Fellowships, DC Commission on the Arts and Humanities (twice)
- Webby Awards (twice)

== Selected works ==
=== Playwright ===
- Abstract Nude
- The Butcher
- Cracked
- The Faithkiller
- The Great Dismal
- Hot and Cold
- Let X
- Reals
- Transmission
- Vertical Constellation with Bomb

=== Print ===
- Abstract Nude
- Cracked
- Inner Harbor: Ten Poems

=== Non-fiction ===
- The Complete Idiot's Guide to Grammar and Style (Forward)
- Routledge Companion to Dramaturgy (chapter, co-written with Jason Loewith)

== Filmography ==
=== Writer ===
- Anthem, directed by Hal Hartley
- All Souls (web series)

== Personal life ==
Suilebhan makes his home in Silver Spring, Maryland. He is married and has a son.

== See also ==
- Poetry Bus Tour
