= Beth Nguyen =

American novelist and nonfiction writer (born 1974)

- Born: Bich Minh Nguyen; 1974 (age 51–52); Ho Chi Minh City, Vietnam
- Education: University of Michigan (MFA)
- Occupations: Novelist; writer
- Website: www.bethminhnguyen.com

Beth Minh Nguyen (née Bich Minh Nguyen, born 1974) is an American novelist and nonfiction writer. She is the author of the novels Short Girls (2009), which won a 2010 American Book Award, and Pioneer Girl (2014). She has also written two memoirs, Stealing Buddha's Dinner (2008) and Owner of a Lonely Heart: A Memoir (2023).

== Life ==
Bich Minh Nguyen was born in 1974 in Saigon, which her family fled by ship the following year. After staying in refugee camps in Guam and at Fort Chaffee in Arkansas, they settled in Grand Rapids, Michigan, where Nguyen grew up.

She graduated from the University of Michigan with a Master of Fine Arts. In 2005, she received a PEN/Jerard Award for her 2008 memoir Stealing Buddha's Dinner. She taught at Purdue University and the University of San Francisco, and is currently a professor at the University of Wisconsin–Madison, where she teaches fiction and creative non-fiction writing.

Nguyen changed her preferred name to "Beth" some time before 2021. She discussed the change in an essay in The New Yorker.

Nguyen married fellow novelist Porter Shreve in 2002. Nguyen stated she was divorced in 2023.

== Works ==
- Stealing Buddha's Dinner. Penguin. 2008. ISBN 978-0-14-311303-4.
- Short Girls: A Novel. Penguin. 2009. ISBN 978-0-670-02081-2.
- Pioneer Girl: A Novel. Penguin. 2014. ISBN 978-0-698-15137-6.
- Owner of a Lonely Heart: A Memoir. Penguin. 2023. ISBN 978-1-982-19634-9.

=== Anthologies ===
- Reinder Van Til; Gordon L. Olson, eds. (2007). "The Good Immigrant Student". Thin ice: coming of age in Grand Rapids. Wm. B. Eerdmans Publishing. ISBN 978-0-8028-2478-3.
- Alice Peck, ed. (2008). "The Plum's Eye". Bread, Body, Spirit: Finding the Sacred in Food. SkyLight Paths Publishing. ISBN 978-1-59473-242-3.
- Lorraine López, ed. (2009). An angle of vision. University of Michigan Press. ISBN 978-0-472-05078-9.
