= Phoenix Poets =

Poetry publishing series of the University of Chicago Press

Phoenix Poets Series
- Country: United States
- Language: English
- Discipline: Poetry
- Publisher: University of Chicago Press
- Published: Annually since 1983
- Website: https://press.uchicago.edu/ucp/books/series/PP.html

The Phoenix Poets series is a poetry publishing imprint of the University of Chicago Press, founded in 1983. The series publishes contemporary poets writing in English, from emerging writers to established figures. Books in the series have received recognition including the Pulitzer Prize, the National Book Critics Circle Award, the National Book Award, the Rome Prize in Literature, the William Carlos Williams Award, and the Lenore Marshall Poetry Prize.

In 2021 the series was relaunched under new editorial leadership. The changes included the Phoenix Emerging Poet Book Prize, awarded annually to a poet who has published no more than two previous books of poetry.

== History ==
=== Founding and early years (1983–2020) ===
The University of Chicago Press established the Phoenix Poets Series in 1983 with the aim of publishing contemporary poets with "a keen awareness of the history and possibilities of poetry." For most of its first four decades, the series operated without a publicly named editorial board; selections were made by an anonymous panel. The series published debut and mid-career collections across a range of styles and traditions.

=== Relaunch (2021–present) ===
In October 2021, the Press announced a relaunch of the series. Srikanth Reddy, a Griffin Prize finalist, Guggenheim Fellow, and professor of English and creative writing at the University of Chicago, was appointed as the new series editor, the first publicly named editor since the 1990s. Reddy was joined by three consulting editors: poet and translator Rosa Alcalá of the University of Texas at El Paso; poet Douglas Kearney of the University of Minnesota, Twin Cities; and poet Katie Peterson of the University of California, Davis, whose collection The Accounts (2013) had previously appeared in the series.

The relaunch introduced several changes: an open submission process accepting manuscripts during October each year; the Phoenix Emerging Poet Book Prize, awarded annually beginning with books published in 2023; a commitment to publishing one book of poetry in translation every two years; and a publicly named editorial board.

== Phoenix Emerging Poet Book Prize ==
=== Eligibility ===
The prize is awarded annually to one manuscript selected from the October open submission period. Eligible poets must have published no more than two previous books of poetry and must be at least 21 years of age. Only one manuscript may be submitted per year, and resubmission in subsequent years is not permitted. Translations are eligible if the original work is in the public domain or if English-language rights are available. Manuscripts must be a minimum of 48 pages.

The prize is awarded at the sole discretion of the series editors and the University of Chicago Press, who may elect not to give the award in a given year.

=== Winners ===
Year (cycle)	Poet	Title	Judge	Ref.
2023 (1st)	Dong Li	The Orange Tree	Srikanth Reddy	
2024 (2nd)	Tracy Fuad	Portal	Srikanth Reddy	
2025 (3rd)	Kristin Dykstra	Dissonance	Srikanth Reddy	
2026 (4th)	Jake Rose	Joan	Srikanth Reddy	

== Notable poets in the series ==
Since its founding, the Phoenix Poets series has published poets whose work has earned national recognition. Among those published in the series are Ha Jin, Reginald Gibbons, Eleanor Wilner, Alan Shapiro, David Ferry, and Anne Winters. Katie Peterson's The Accounts (2013), published in the series, received the Rilke Prize from the University of North Texas.

== Editorial history ==
From its founding through approximately the 1990s, the series operated with a named editor. It was thereafter run by an anonymous editorial panel until the 2021 relaunch, when Srikanth Reddy was appointed series editor alongside consulting editors Rosa Alcalá, Douglas Kearney, and Katie Peterson.

== See also ==
- APR/Honickman First Book Prize
- University of Chicago Press
- Yale Series of Younger Poets
