= Graham Foust =

American poet (born 1970)

Graham W. Foust (born August 25, 1970) is an American poet and currently is an associate professor at the University of Denver.

== Early life and education ==
Foust was born in Knoxville, Tennessee and grew up in Eau Claire, Wisconsin. He has a Bachelor of Arts in Creative Writing from Beloit College, a Master of Fine Arts from George Mason University, and a Ph.D. from the State University of New York-Buffalo.

== Academic ==
Foust teaches contemporary poetry in both an English literature and creative writing context. From 1998 to 2000, Foust, along with Benjamin Friedlander, co-edited Lagniappe, an online journal devoted to poetry and poetics. From 2002 to 2005, Foust was a professor at Drake University in Des Moines, Iowa; he is presently an associate professor at the University of Denver.

== Poet ==
What part of
"What part of no
don’t you understand?"

don’t you understand…

— "Poem with Television"

Foust has written six full collections of poetry; As in Every Deafness (Flood Editions, 2003), Leave the Room to Itself (Ahsahta Press, 2004), Necessary Stranger (Flood Editions, 2007), A Mouth in California (Flood Editions, 2009), To Anacreon In Heaven (Flood Editions, 2013), and "Time Down to Mind" (Flood Editions, 2015).

He most recently published a collection of translations from German, in collaboration with Samuel Frederick, of Ernst Meister's later poems titled In Time's Rift [Im Zeitspalt], through Wave Books in September, 2012.

== Reception ==
You don’t lust
for what you
want. You lust
for what you

can get.

— "Poem With Rules and Laws"

Three of Foust's poems were featured in the winter 2009 (volume 43, issue 1) edition of The Laurel Review: The Only Poem, Promotional, and Frost at Midnight. Foust's work was also chosen by Robert Creeley for the Beyond Arcadia issue of Conjunctions.

David Pavelich believes Foust's poetry to be "a unique blend of whisper and raw humor, darkness and economy of thought". Foust's third book, Necessary Stranger, was described as "intense, hip, ironic and subtly humorous" in Publishers Weekly, and in December 2007 reached third place on the small-press poetry best-seller list. His fourth book, A Mouth in California, received a starred review in Publishers Weekly, which noted that Foust had "achieved a wide reputation in and beyond experimental poetry circles for his clipped, breathless poems, often no longer than one or two haiku, but packing an intimate punch that belies their length."

Foust has cited Rae Armantrout as an influence; Armantrout pronounced herself "quite pleased" with that, saying she was "very fond of [Foust's] work", but considered Foust to have a distinctive style: "Foust's poems are minimalist, yes, more so than mine, in fact, but his sensibility is very much his own." A review of A Mouth in California in the Oxonian Review characterised Foust's work as "bleak, funny, curt, and self-effacing", informed by the understanding that "everyday speech, set slightly out of joint or context, can deliver both personal and collective revelation. [...] Foust [...] doesn’t take himself too seriously, yet he’s a seriously good poet. [...] And best of all, Foust is subtle."

== Bibliography ==
- Nightingalelessness (Flood Editions, 2018)
- Time Down to Mind (Flood Editions, 2015)
- Of Entirety Say the Sentence, poems by Ernst Meister, co-translated with Samuel Frederick (Wave Books, 2015)
- Wallless Space, poems by Ernst Meister, co-translated with Samuel Frederick (Wave Books, 2014)
- To Anacreon in Heaven and Other Poems (Flood Editions, 2013)
- In Time's Rift [Im Zeitspalt] poems by Ernst Meister, co-translated with Samuel Frederick (Wave Books, 2012)
- A Mouth In California (Flood Editions, 2009)
- Necessary Stranger (Flood Editions, 2007)
- As in Every Deafness (Flood Editions, 2003)
- Leave the Room to Itself (Ahsahta, 2003)
