= Susan Shreve =

American novelist

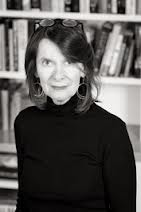
- Born: May 2, 1939 (age 87); Toledo, Ohio, U.S.
- Education: University of Pennsylvania (BA); University of Virginia (MA)
- Occupations: Professor, writer
- Writing career
- Genres: novel, memoir, children's literature

Susan Shreve (also known as Susan Richards Shreve) is an American novelist, memoirist, and children's book author. She has published fifteen novels, most recently More News Tomorrow (2019), and a memoir Warm Springs: Traces of a Childhood (2007). She has also published thirty books for children, most recently The Lovely Shoes (2011), and edited or co-edited five anthologies. Shreve co-founded the Master of Fine Arts (MFA) in Creative Writing program at George Mason University in 1980, where she teaches fiction writing. She is the co-founder and the former chairman of the PEN/Faulkner Foundation. She lives in Washington, D.C.

== Early life ==
Susan Richards Shreve was born May 2, 1939, in Toledo, Ohio, but moved with her family to Washington, D.C., at the age of three. She attended and graduated from Sidwell Friends School in 1957.

== Education ==
Shreve received a BA in English from the University of Pennsylvania in 1961, and an MA in English from the University of Virginia in 1969.

== Career ==
She founded the Master of Fine Arts in Creative Writing program at George Mason University in 1980 and has taught there ever since. She has been a visiting professor at Columbia School of the Arts, Princeton University, and Goucher College. She has received a Guggenheim Award for Fiction, a National Endowment grant for Fiction, the Jenny Moore Chair in Creative Writing at George Washington University, the Grub Street Prize for non-fiction, the Poets and Writers’ Service award, and the Sidwell Friends School Outstanding Alumni Award. In 1980, Shreve co-founded the PEN/Faulkner Foundation, which presents the PEN/Faulkner Award for Fiction annually.

Shreve published her first novel, A Fortunate Madness, in 1974. Thirteen novels have followed. She published a novel Glimmer under the pseudonym Annie Waters in 1997. Shreve wrote about her experience as a patient at FDR's polio clinic in her memoir Warm Springs: Traces of a Childhood (2007). Her most recent novel, More News Tomorrow, was published in 2019.

Shreve's children's books include the Joshua T. Bates series (1984-2000), Blister (2001), an ALA Notable Book and a Publishers Weekly Best Children's Book, and most recently The Lovely Shoes (2011). When writing for young readers, she publishes as Susan Shreve.

== Works ==
=== Novels ===
- More News Tomorrow, New York: W W Norton, 2019. ISBN 0393292940
- You Are the Love of My Life New York : W W Norton, 2012. ISBN 9780393345940, OCLC 812254177
- A Student of Living Things, New York, N.Y.: Plume, 2007. ISBN 9780452288492, OCLC 148697093
- Plum and Jaggers Seattle, WA : AmazonEncore, 2001. ISBN 9781477819456, OCLC 865494931
- Glimmer, New York : Berkley Books, 1997. ISBN 9780425164846, OCLC 39198345, published under the pseudonym Annie Waters
- The Visiting Physician New York: N.A. Talese, 1996. ISBN 9780385477017, OCLC 32893393
- The Train Home New York : Ivy Books, 1993. ISBN 9780804112949, OCLC 31026061
- Daughters of the New World New York : Ballantine Books, 1994. ISBN 9780804111232, OCLC 1012620350
- A Country of Strangers Sceptre, 1990. ISBN 9780340525524, OCLC 21231291
- Queen of Hearts New York : Pocket Books, 1988. ISBN 9780671647643, OCLC 17744667
- Dreaming of Heroes New York : Berkley Books, 1984. ISBN 9780425085356, OCLC 13285106
- Miracle Play New York : Playboy, 1982. ISBN 9780867211825, OCLC 8951593
- Children of Power New York : Berkley Books, 1979. ISBN 9780425044780, OCLC 6843057
- A Woman Like That] New York : Atheneum, 1977; London : H. Hamilton, 1978. ISBN 9780241899724, OCLC 16437786
- A fortunate madness Boston, Houghton Mifflin, 1974. ISBN 9780395185001, OCLC 866508

=== Memoir ===
- Warm Springs : Traces of a Childhood at Fdr's Polio Haven, Boston : Mariner Books, 2008. OCLC 1036979087

=== Edited Anthologies ===
- Dream Me Home Safely: Writers on Growing up in America Boston : Houghton Mifflin, 2003. ISBN 9780618379026, OCLC 52853822
- With son Porter Shreve:
  - Tales out of School: Contemporary Writers on Their Student Years (2000)
  - How We Want to Live: Narratives on Progress (1998)
  - Outside the Law: Narratives on Justice (1997)
- With Marita Golden:
  - Skin Deep: Black Women and White Women Write About Race (1995)

=== Novels for Children (as Susan Shreve) ===
- The search for Baby Ruby, New York, NY : Arthur A. Levine Books, 2015. ISBN 9780545417839, OCLC 890377578
- The Lovely Shoes New York : Arthur A. Levine Books, 2011. ISBN 9780439680493, OCLC 659412779
- Under the Watson's Porch (2004)
- Trout and Me New York : Dell Yearling, 2002. ISBN 9780440419020, OCLC 56714332
- Blister, New York : Scholastic Signature, 2001. ISBN 9780439193146, OCLC 781057193 companion novel to Jonah, the Whale
- Ghost Cats] New York : Scholastic, 2000. ISBN 9780590371322, OCLC 48134837
- Jonah, the Whale New York : Scholastic, 1999. ISBN 9780590371346, OCLC 43164804
- Joshua T. Bates takes charge Dan Andreasen illustrator, New York : Dell Yearling, 1997. ISBN 9780679870395, OCLC 45905006
- Warts, illustrated by Gregg Thorkelson (1996)
- The Goalie New York : Morrow Junior; London : Hi Marketing, 1999. ISBN 9780688158583, OCLC 60212143
- Zoe and Columbo], illustrated by Gregg Thorkelson, New York : Tambourine Books, 1995. ISBN 9780688135522, OCLC 32665253
- The Formerly Great Alexander Family, illustrated by Chris Cart, New York : Tambourine Books, 1995. ISBN 9780688135515, OCLC 31756258
- Lucy Forever, Miss Rosetree, and the Stolen Baby, illustrated by Eric Jon Nones, New York: Tambourine Books, 1994. ISBN 9780688124793, OCLC 29361037
- Amy Dunn Quits School, illustrated by Diane de Groat (1993)
- Wait for Me, illustrated by Diane de Groat, New York : Tambourine Books, 1992. ISBN 9780688111205, OCLC 24379472
- The Gift of the Girl Who Couldn't Hear (1991)
- Lily and the Runaway Baby, illustrated by Sue Truesdell, New York : Random House, 1987. ISBN 9780394891040, OCLC 15316259
- Lucy Forever and Miss Rosetree, Shrinks Beech Tree Bks, 1997. ISBN 9780688149581, OCLC 59585145
- How I Saved the World on Purpose], illustrated by Suzanne Richardson, New York : Holt, Rinehart, and Winston, 1985. ISBN 9780030704567, OCLC 11398088
- The Bad Dreams of a Good Girl, illustrated by Diane de Groat, New York, N.Y. : Beech Tree Books, 1993. ISBN 9780688121136, OCLC 26362948
- The Revolution of Mary Leary (1982)
- The Masquerade New York, N.Y. : Dell, 1980. ISBN 9780440953968, OCLC 7869594
- Family Secrets: Five Very Important Stories, illustrated by Richard Cuffari (1979)
- Loveletters (1978)
- The Nightmares of Geranium Street (1977)

== Personal life ==
She married Porter Shreve, with whom she had four children. Shreve later married noted literary agent Timothy Seldes. Her oldest son is the author Porter Shreve.
