= Travis Nichols =

American poet and novelist (born 1979)

- Born: 1979 (age 46–47); Ames, Iowa, U.S.
- Education: University of Georgia; University of Massachusetts Amherst
- Occupations: Poet; novelist

Travis Nichols (born 1979) is an American poet, novelist, and journalist. His work spans various genres, including experimental poetry, satirical novels, and cultural criticism. He is also known for his professional roles in advocacy and politics.

== Early life and education ==
Travis Nichols was born in Ames, Iowa, in 1979. He earned a Bachelor of Arts degree from the University of Georgia and a Master of Fine Arts from the University of Massachusetts-Amherst. Prior to his writing career, Nichols held a variety of professions, including film projectionist, bookseller, dishwasher, teacher, estate sales consultant, movie critic, and journalist. He participated in the Wave Books Poetry Bus Tour.

== Career ==
=== Literary works ===
Nichols's poetry often explores themes of everyday observation, human relationships, and the absurd. His collections include:

- Iowa (Letter Machine Editions, 2010)
- See Me Improving (Copper Canyon Press, 2010)

His novels are characterized by their experimental form, humor, and engagement with contemporary culture, particularly internet phenomena and societal obsessions. His published novels are:

- Off We Go Into the Wild Blue Yonder (Coffee House Press, 2010)
- The More You Ignore Me (Coffee House Press, 2013)

=== Professional and advocacy roles ===
Beyond his literary and artistic endeavors, Nichols has engaged in journalism and advocacy. He was the Communications Director for Greenpeace USA, as well as the Communications Lead for Jane Fonda's Fire Drill Fridays. Before founding Instrumental Intelligence in 2025, he was the Director of Content Strategy for the international humanitarian organization CARE.org, and editor of the organization's News & Stories.

From 2008 to 2012, he was an editor for the Poetry Foundation, in charge of the controversial blog, Harriet, and responsible for collaborations with Charlie Kaufman, James Franco, Tao Lin, Laurel Nakadate, Emily Gould, Matthew Zapruder, Emily Witt, Daniel Borzutsky, among others.

At Greenpeace, he collaborated with the activist group The Yes Men on the "Arctic Ready" campaign, as well as authors and artists like Lauren Groff, Min Jin Lee, and Leni Zumas as part of the Climate Visionaries project.

After the Energy Transfer trial, Nichols published a defense of Greenpeace in Rolling Stone.
