= Matthew Rohrer =

American poet (born 1970)

- Born: 1970 (age 55–56); Ann Arbor, Michigan
- Education: University of Michigan, University of Iowa
- Occupations: Writer, poet, editor, professor
- Notable work: A Hummock in the Malookas, A Green Light

Matthew Rohrer (born 1970) is an American poet. He is the author of ten books of poetry.

== Early life and education ==
Born in Ann Arbor, Michigan, Rohrer was raised in Oklahoma. Rohrer has said that he was a diligent student who finished his work quickly to make time for reading and writing. He earned a BA from the University of Michigan (where he won a Hopwood Award for poetry) and an MFA in poetry from the University of Iowa. He also spent time studying at University College Dublin.

== Work ==
=== A Hummock in the Malookas ===
His first book of poetry, A Hummock in the Malookas (1995), was selected by Mary Oliver for the 1994 National Poetry Series. Rohrer worked as a night janitor at the University of Iowa's Van Allen astronomy building while writing the poems.

=== A Green Light ===
In 2005, his collection A Green Light was shortlisted for the International Griffin Poetry Prize. James Tate said of A Green Light: "There are poems in A Green Light that can break your heart with their unexpected twists and turns. You think you know where you are and then you don't and it is inexplicably sad. You experience some kind of emotion that you can't even name, but it's deep and real. That's the power of Matthew Rohrer's new poems."

=== The Sky Contains the Plans ===
Rohrer wrote the poems for The Sky Contains the Plans in the "hypnagogic state" between sleeping and waking. As he explains:

When you’re falling asleep, your mind enters this in-between state where you’re not quite asleep but you feel you’re dreaming, and I think most people hear voices or sounds, some people see images ... I became fascinated by how you sort of lose control of your body and your mind, and begin to hear voices and you think, 'What was that?' I began paying attention to the voices and the phrases and sentences I heard, and realized they were weird—and not weird in a dreamy way or surreal; they were sort of boring. In fact, they were mostly boring. Even tacky phrases I would never think to use. I decided to start writing down these mundane, boring voices and phrases. I got the idea to write down 100 of them. I trained myself to do that at night, falling asleep with a notebook in my hand, then waking up when I heard them. My plan was to get 100 of them and then they would become the first line of a hundred poems.

He spent around a year collecting the first hundred lines and then expanded them into the hundred poems that comprise the book.

== Personal life ==
Rohrer claims to primarily write while lying down or walking.

He was a co-founder and poetry editor for Fence magazine, which began printing in 1998.

He lives in Brooklyn, New York and teaches at New York University.

== Bibliography ==
- Army of Giants (Wave Books, 2024)
- The Sky Contains the Plans (Wave Books, 2020)
- The Others (Wave Books, 2017)
- Surrounded by Friends (Wave Books, 2015)
- Destroyer and Preserver (Wave Books, 2011)
- A Plate of Chicken (Ugly Duckling Presse, 2009)
- Rise Up (Wave Books, 2007)
- A Green Light (Verse Press, 2004)
- Nice Hat. Thanks. (Verse Press, 2002) – with Joshua Beckman
- Satellite (Verse Press, 2001)
- A Hummock in the Malookas (W.W. Norton, 1995)

== Discography ==
- Adventures While Preaching the Gospel of Beauty (2003) – with Joshua Beckman
