= C. A. Conrad =

American poet, professor, and author (born 1966)

C.A. Conrad
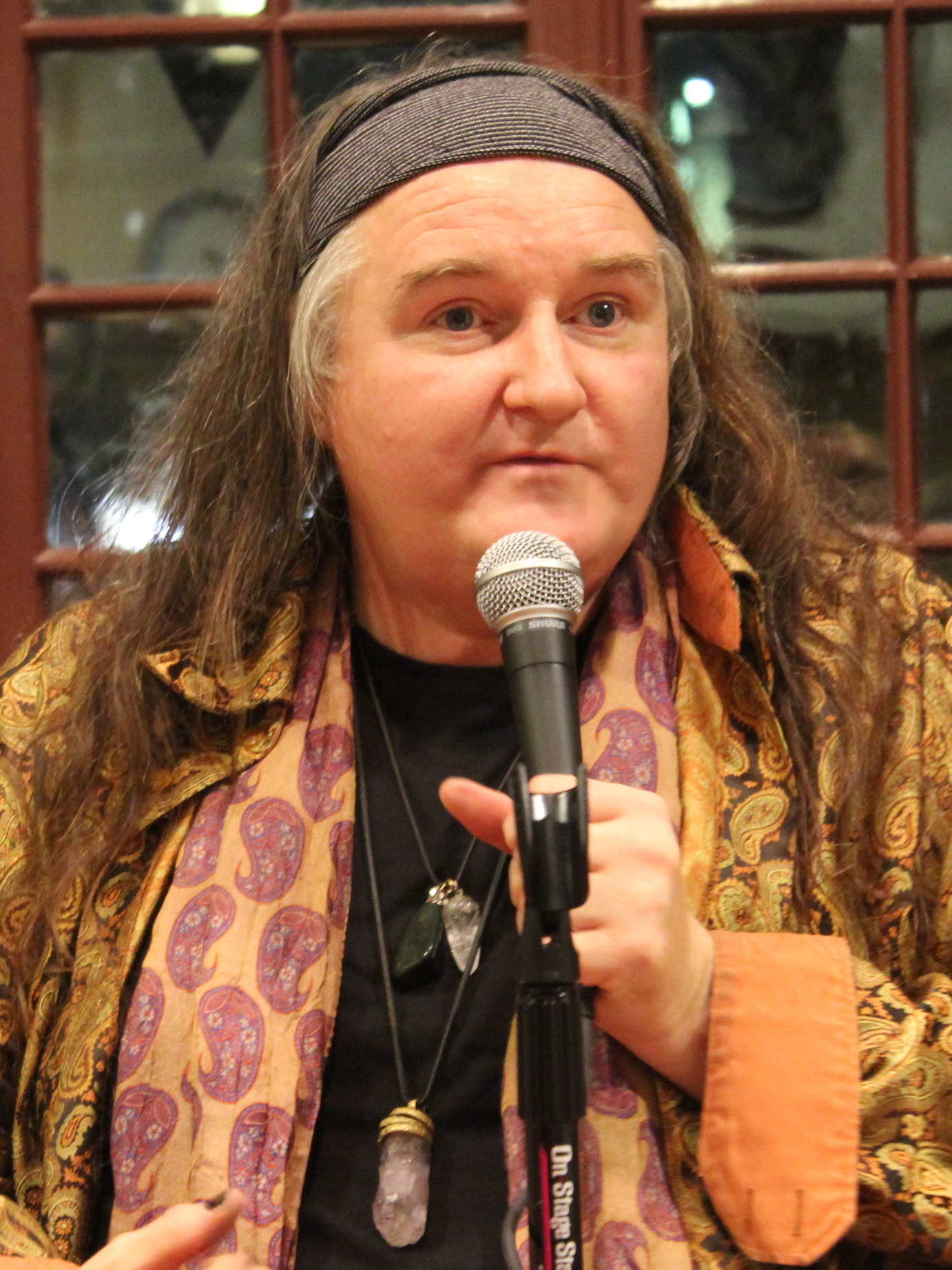
- Conrad in 2018
- Born: January 1, 1966 (age 60); Topeka, Kansas, US
- Occupation: poet
- Writing career
- Language: English
- Genre: Poetry

C.A. Conrad (born 1966) is an American poet, professor, and the author of seven books. They were based in Philadelphia and later Asheville, North Carolina and Athens, Georgia.

== Early life ==
CAConrad was born January 1, 1966, in Topeka, Kansas, and grew up in Boyertown, Pennsylvania. Their mother was a fourteen-year-old runaway and their father was a Vietnam War veteran. Their mother married three times.

Conrad was bullied as a child and stated in the feature film documentary, The Book of Conrad (2015), "People called me ‘faggot’ more than they called me my name."

== Career ==
Conrad is known for using and inventing the poetic form of "[Soma]tics." This form is a sort of writing prompt/personal exercise in being engaged in the present moment.

Conrad was the subject of the 2016 feature documentary “The Book of Conrad” directed by David C. Welch and Belinda Schmid, which premiered as part of the main slate at the Thessaloniki Documentary Film Festival and screened as part of the Gelatina Festival in Spain and at the Museum of Modern Art in Vienna. Conrad was one of the two poets in the short film, I Hope I'm Loud When I'm Dead (2018) by filmmaker Beatrice Gibson, also featured was poet Eileen Myles.

Conrad was a 2014 Lannan Fellow, a 2013 MacDowell Fellow, and a 2011 Pew Fellow, they also conduct workshops on (Soma)tic poetry and Ecopoetics. Their book While Standing in Line for Death won a 2018 Lambda Book Award. Amanda Paradise: Resurrect Extinct Vibration received a 2022 PEN Oakland – Josephine Miles Literary Award. In 2022, they were awarded a Ruth Lilly Poetry Prize for lifetime achievement in poetry.

In 2019, Conrad cancelled their planned appearance at the Swiss Institute Contemporary Art New York because of the organizations support of artist Tobias Madison, who was accused of domestic violence.

Conrad teaches poetry at Columbia University and the Sandberg Art Institute in Amsterdam.

== Personal life ==
Conrad identifies as Queer. In 1998, Conrad's boyfriend Mark Holmes was murdered in Tennessee.

== Bibliography ==
- Deviant Propulsion (Soft Skull Press, 2006) ISBN 9781932360875, OCLC 57506566
- Advanced Elvis Course (Soft Skull Press, 2009) ISBN 9781593762438, OCLC 276339539
- The Book of Frank (Wave Books, 2010/Chax Press, 2009) ISBN 9781933517490, OCLC 645248360
- The City Real & Imagined (with Frank Sherlock) (Factory School Books, 2010)
- A Beautiful Marsupial Afternoon: New (Soma)tics (Wave Books, 2012) ISBN 9781933517599, OCLC 752471228
- Ecodeviance : (soma)tics for the future wilderness (Wave Books, 2014) ISBN 9781940696010, OCLC 956321378
- PHILIP SEYMOUR HOFFMAN (were you high when you said this?) (Worms Press, 2014)
- While Standing in Line for Death (Wave Books, 2017) ISBN 9781940696553, OCLC 962409884
- Amanda Paradise: Resurrect Extinct Vibration (Wave Books, 2021) ISBN 978-1950268429, OCLC 1240828484
- You Don't Have What It Takes To Be My Nemesis: And Other (Soma)tics (Penguin Books, 2023) ISBN 9781802062458, OCLC 1388645152
- Listen to the Golden Boomerang Return (Wave Books, 2024) ISBN 9781950268962, OCLC 1399572369

== Filmography ==
Year	Title	Role	Type	Notes
2015	The Book of Conrad	Self	documentary film	
2015	Boyland	Jeremiah	short film	
2018	I Hope I'm Loud When I'm Dead	Script writing / poetry	short film	
