= Michael Earl Craig =

American poet

- Born: 1970 (age 55–56); Dayton, Ohio
- Education: University of Montana; University of Massachusetts Amherst
- Known for: Poetry
- Style: Free verse

Michael Earl Craig is an American poet and farrier living in Livingston, Montana. He was born in Dayton, Ohio in 1970.

Craig is the author of six books of poetry. His work has been included in the anthologies Isn’t It Romantic (2004), Everyman’s Library Poems About Horses (2009), and The Best American Poetry (2014). He served as Poet Laureate of Montana from 2015 to 2017.

The Poetry Foundation writes that "Craig's poems question the assumptions and habits of daily life, using humor and frequent glimpses of a torqued pastoral landscape."

Craig attended the University of Montana as an undergraduate and received an MFA from the University of Massachusetts in 1998. In 1997, he rode a horse across the state of Montana.

== Bibliography ==
- Iggy Horse. Wave Books. 2023. ISBN 978-1-95026-875-7.
- Woods and Clouds Interchangeable. Wave Books. 2019. ISBN 978-1-94069-681-2.
- Talkativeness. Wave Books. 2014. ISBN 978-1-93351-783-4.
- Thin Kimono. Wave Books. 2010. ISBN 978-1-93351-746-9.
- Yes, Master. Fence Books. 2006. ISBN 978-0-97710-646-2.
- Can You Relax in My House. Fence Books. 2002. ISBN 978-0-97131-891-5.
