= Kathleen Ossip =

American poet

- Born: Albany, New York, U.S.
- Occupation: Poet
- Genre: Poetry

Kathleen Ossip is an American poet and writer. She is the author of three volumes of poetry: The Do-Over, which was a New York Times Editors' Choice; The Cold War, which was one of Publishers Weekly's Best Books of 2011; and The Search Engine, selected by Derek Walcott for the American Poetry Review/Honickman First Book Prize. Her poems have appeared widely in such publications as The Washington Post, The Best American Poetry, The Best American Magazine Writing, The New York Review of Books, The Nation, The New Republic, The Believer, Poetry, Paris Review, Kenyon Review, and many others.

Ossips's collection Do Over was published in 2015 to much critical acclaim, with reviews in The New York Times, The Harvard Review, The Boston Review, Slate and other journals and publications.

Ossip teaches at The New School, the 92nd Street Y, and the Hudson Valley Writers Center. She was born in Albany, NY and lives in Hastings on Hudson, NY, with her family.

== Published works ==
- July (Sarabande Books, 2021)
- The Do-Over (Sarabande Books, 2015)
- The Cold War (Sarabande Books, 2011)
- The Search Engine (American Poetry Review/Copper Canyon Press, 2002)

== Awards ==
- Radcliffe Fellowship, Radcliffe Institute for Advanced Study, Harvard University, 2016–2017.
- The Do-Over, a New York Times Editors’ Choice, May 1, 2015.
- “Elegies” selected for The Best American Magazine Writing, 2014.
- Pushcart Prize for “Elegies,” 2015.
- Fellow, New York Foundation for the Arts, 2007.
- The Search Engine, American Poetry Review/Honickman First Book Prize. Selected by Derek Walcott. 2002.
- "The Nature of Things” selected for The Best American Poetry 2001. Editor, Robert Hass.
