= Chelsey Minnis =

American poet (born 1970)

Chelsey Minnis (born 1970 in Dallas, Texas) is an American poet. Her collections of poetry include Zirconia, Bad Bad, Poemland, and Baby I Don't Care. Zirconia won the 2001 Alberta Prize for Poetry. She received a B. A. in English from the University of Colorado Boulder and studied at the Iowa Writers' Workshop.

Minnis's work was described as expressing a "gurlesque" aesthetic by Arielle Greenberg, which she described as "a feminine, feminist incorporating of the grotesque and cruel with the spangled and dreamy."

== Selected works ==
- Zirconia. New York: Fence Books, 2001.
- Foxina. Los Angeles: Seeing Eye Books, 2002.
- Bad Bad. New York: Fence Books, 2007.
- Poemland. Seattle: Wave Books, 2009.
- Baby, I Don't Care. Seattle: Wave Books, 2018.
- Opera Fever. Seattle: Wave Books, 2026.
