= Dorothea Lasky =

American poet (born 1978)

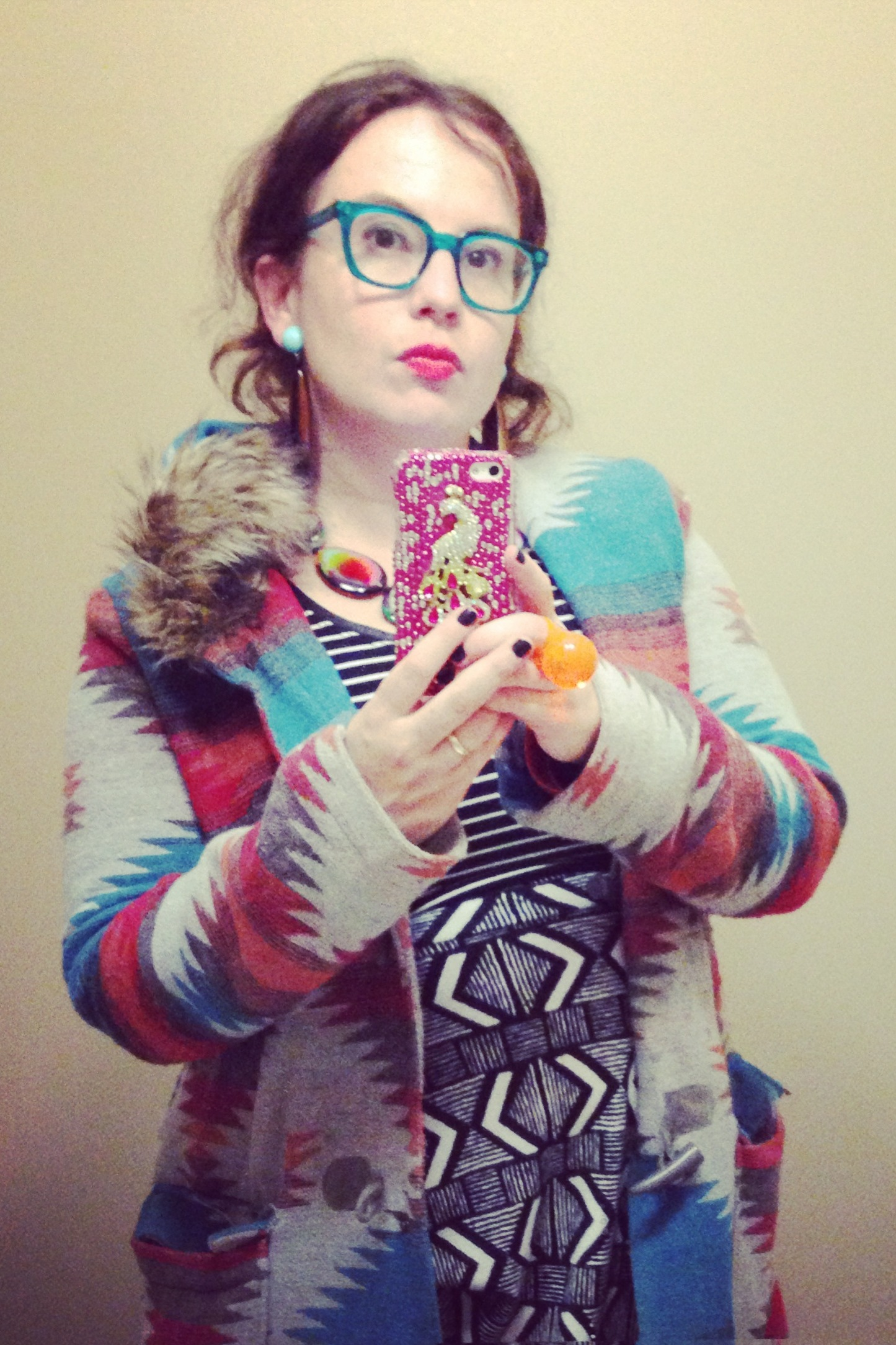
- Dorothea Lasky in 2013
- Born: 1978 (age 47–48); St. Louis, Missouri
- Education: Washington University in St. Louis; University of Massachusetts Amherst; Harvard University; University of Pennsylvania
- Writing career
- Genre: Poetry
- Subject: Poetry
- Website: www.dorothealasky.com

Dorothea Lasky is an American poet. She is currently an Associate Professor of Poetry at Columbia University School of the Arts.

== Background and education ==
She was born in St. Louis, Missouri in 1978. She graduated from Ladue Horton Watkins High School in 1996. She earned a BA in classics and psychology from Washington University in St. Louis. She earned her MFA in Poetry from the University of Massachusetts Amherst's MFA Program for Poets & Writers, and her Ed.M. in Arts & Education from Harvard University, and her Ed.D. in Creativity and Education from the University of Pennsylvania.

Her work has appeared in The Paris Review, Boston Review, and The New Yorker.

== Bibliography ==
=== Full-length collections ===
- Animal. Wave Books, 2019. ISBN 9781940696911
- Astro Poets: Your Guides to the Zodiac. With Alex Dimitrov. Flatiron Books, 2019. ISBN 9781250313300
- Milk Wave Books, 2018. ISBN 978-1940696645
- I Used to Be a Witch. Winston-Salem, NC: Fjords. 2017.
- Rome: Poems. Liveright. 29 September 2014. ISBN 978-0-87140-940-9.
- Open the Door: How to Excite Young People About Poetry. San Francisco: McSweeney's Books. 2013. Ed. with Dominic Luxford and Jesse Nathan.
- Matter: A Picturebook. New York: Argos Books. 2012.
- Rome, Liveright, 2012, ISBN 9780871409393
- Thunderbird. Wave Books. 11 September 2012. ISBN 978-1-933517-63-6.
- Black Life. Wave Books. 1 April 2010. ISBN 978-1-933517-43-8.
- Awe. Wave Books. 1 September 2007. ISBN 978-1-933517-24-7.

=== Chapbooks and pamphlets ===
- Snakes (Tungsten Press, 2018)
- Poetry is Not a Project (Ugly Duckling Presse, 2010)
- Tourmaline (Transmission Press, 2008)
- The Hatmaker's Wife (2006)
- Art (H NGM N Press, 2005)
- Alphabets & Portraits (Anchorite Press, 2004)
