= Joshua Beckman =

American poet

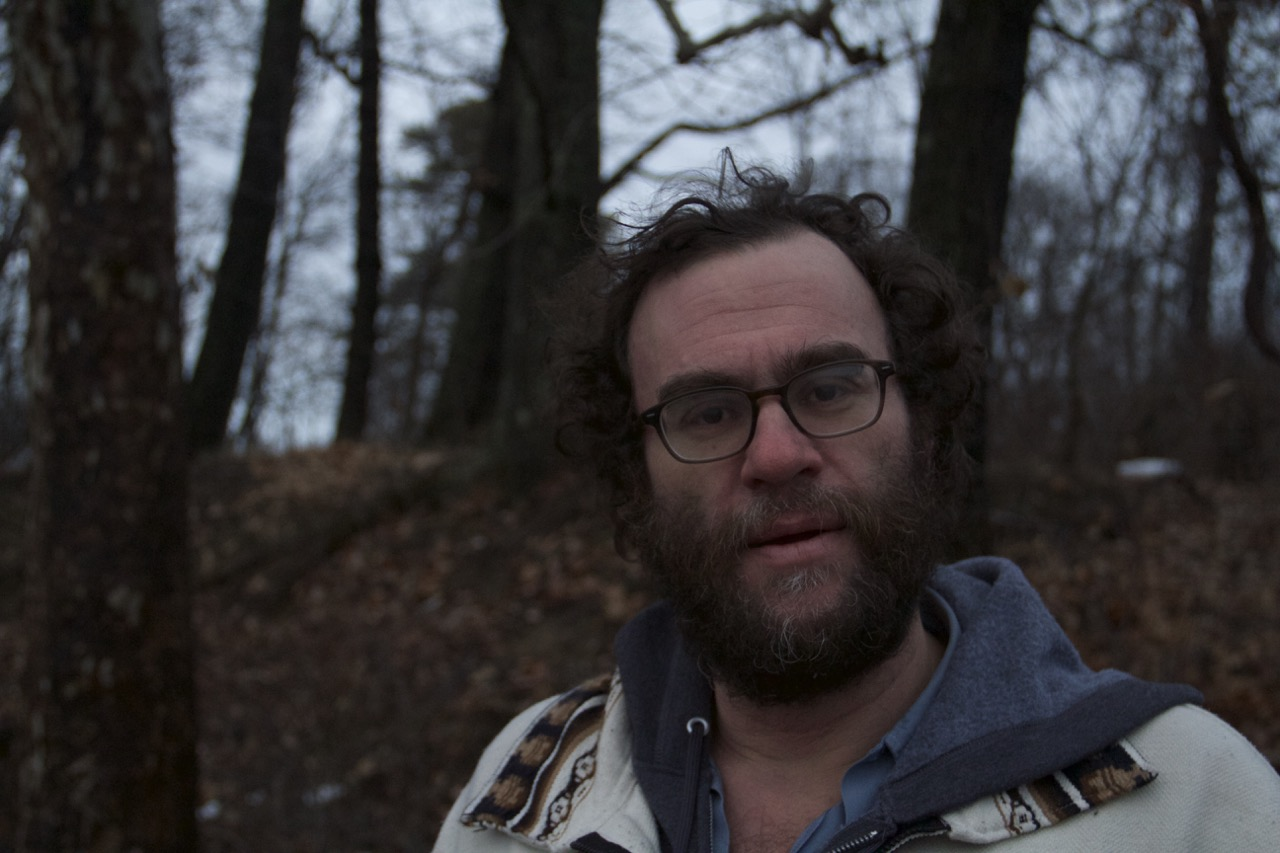
- Born: New Haven, Connecticut
- Occupations: Poet, editor

Joshua Beckman is an American poet.

== Life ==
Joshua Beckman was born in 1971 New Haven, Connecticut, and graduated from Hampshire College.

He is the author of eight collections of poetry, including The Inside of an Apple (which was a finalist for the Los Angeles Times Book Award), Take It, Shake, and Things Are Happening, which won the first annual Honickman-APR book award. He has collaborated with Matthew Rohrer on live improvised poems, collected in the book Nice Hat. Thanks and the audio CD Adventures While Preaching the Gospel of Beauty (which was recorded while on a 25-city tour). As part of their collaboration Beckman and Rohrer also performed an improvised walking tour of the Brooklyn Museum and a class on eavesdropping for the Museum of Modern Art.

Beckman is an editor at Wave Books and has translated numerous works of poetry and prose, including Poker by Tomaž Šalamun, which was a finalist for the PEN America Poetry in Translation Award, as well as multiple co-translations with Alejandro de Acosta.

Beckman is also the recipient of numerous other awards, including a NYFA fellowship and a Pushcart Prize.

A graduate of Hampshire College in Amherst, Massachusetts, he was the editor of the short-lived literary magazine, Object Lesson, which served as inspiration for subsequent literary and artistic publishing ventures.

He lives in Seattle and New York.

== Wave Books Poetry Bus Tour 2006 ==
Beckman was the tour coordinator of the Poetry Bus Tour, a literary event sponsored by Wave Books in 2006. It featured a tour of contemporary poets, traveling by a 40-foot biodiesel bus, who stopped to perform in 50 North American cities over the course of 50 days.

== Bibliography ==
- The Inside of an Apple
- Micrograms (Wave Books, 2011; co-translated with Alejandro de Acosta)
- 5 Meters of Poems by Carlos Oquendo de Amat (Ugly Duckling Presse, 2010; co-translated with Alejandro de Acosta)
- Take It, Wave Books, 2009, ISBN 9781933517377
- Shake
- Your Time Has Come, Verse Press, 2004, ISBN 9780972348751
- Poker by Tomaž Šalamun (translated by Joshua Beckman) (Ugly Duckling Presse, 2004)
- Nice Hat. Thanks. Verse Press, 2002, ISBN 9780972348706; (with Matthew Rohrer)
- Something I Expected To Be Different, Verse Press, 2001, ISBN 9780970367242
- Things Are Happening Copper Canyon Press, 1998, ISBN 9780966339512

== Discography ==
- Adventures While Preaching the Gospel of Beauty (2003) - with Matthew Rohrer
