= Wave Books =

American independent press

- Founded: 2005
- Country of origin: United States
- Headquarters location: Seattle, Washington
- Distribution: Consortium Book Sales and Distribution
- Publication types: books
- Fiction genres: poetry
- Official website: www.wavepoetry.com

Wave Books (established 2005) is an American independent press focusing on the publication of poetry, with a focus on innovative, contemporary poetry and poetry in translation. Books published by Wave have been finalists for and winners of the Pulitzer Prize for Literature, the Griffin Poetry Prize, and the National Book Award for Poetry. Writers published by Wave Books include CAConrad, Don Mee Choi, Timothy Donnelly, Kate Durbin, Renee Gladman, Terrance Hayes, Tyehimba Jess, Douglas Kearney, Dorothea Lasky, Ben Lerner, Chelsey Minnis, Eileen Myles, Maggie Nelson, Hoa Nguyen, Mary Ruefle, Rachel Zucker, and others.

== Wave Books Poetry Bus Tour 2006 ==
Poetry Bus Tour was a literary event sponsored by Wave Books in 2006. It featured a tour of contemporary poets, traveling by a forty-foot Biodiesel bus, who stopped to perform in fifty North American cities over the course of fifty days.

== Wave's Annual Poetry Festival 2011: Poetry in Translation ==
Every two years from 2009-2013 Wave Books presented three days of poetry. It held three days of poetry in translation November 4–6, 2011, with the help of the Henry Art Gallery at the University of Washington. The event featured film screenings, art exhibitions, lectures, discussions and readings with featured poets and translators.

== Book design ==
Wave books are published with simple covers, lacking the marketing blurbs common in the publishing world. Its translations avoid the use of facing pages of original and translated text, and the translation of Olio includes foldout, detachable pages.

In 2021 Wave began producing its first audiobooks that are recorded as read by the author in a live audience setting.

== Selected publications ==
- I Imagine I Been Science Fiction Always by Douglas Kearney, April 2025 (2026 Pulitzer finalist)
- Blood Snow by dg nanouk okpik, October 2022 (2023 Pulitzer finalist)
- Sho by Douglas Kearney, 2022 (Griffin Prize Winner)
- AMANDA PARADISE by CAConrad, September 2021
- A Thousand Times You Lose Your Treasure by Hoa Nguyen, April 2021 (Finalist, National Book Awards)
- DMZ Colony by Don Mee Choi, April 2020 (Winner, National Book Award)
- Olio by Tyehimba Jess, April 2016 (Pulitzer winner)
- Yi Sang: Selected Works edited by Don Mee Choi (translated by Choi, Jack Jung, Joyelle McSweeney, and Sawako Nakayasu), September 2020
- The Pedestrians by Rachel Zucker, April 2014
- If I Don't Breathe How Do I Sleep by Joe Wenderoth, April 2014
- Hoarders by Kate Durbin, May 2021
- Talkativeness by Michael Earl Craig, April 2014
- Language Arts by Cedar Sigo, April 2014
- Etruria by Rodney Koeneke, April 2014
- Poems (1962-1997) by Robert Lax, November 2013
- Soul in Space by Noelle Kocot, October 2013
- Trances of the Blast by Mary Ruefle, October 2013. (Pulitzer finalist)
- The Inside of an Apple by Joshua Beckman, September 2013
- People on Sunday by Geoffrey G. O'Brien, September 2013
