= Eugene Lang College of Liberal Arts =

American liberal arts college

- Former names: Freshman Year Program (1972–1975); The Seminar College (1975–1985); Eugene Lang College (1985–2005); Eugene Lang College The New School for Liberal Arts (2005–2015)
- Type: Private liberal arts college
- Established: 1972; 54 years ago
- Parent institution: The New School
- Dean: Christoph Cox
- Students: 1,512
- Location: New York, United States; 40.735°N 73.997°W
- Campus: Urban
- Colors: White, Black, Parsons Red
- Mascot: Gnarls the Narwhal
- Website: newschool.edu/lang

Eugene Lang College of Liberal Arts, commonly referred to as Lang, is the seminar-style, undergraduate, liberal arts college of The New School. It is located on-campus in Greenwich Village in New York City on West 11th Street off 6th Avenue.

== History ==
The program that became Eugene Lang College began in 1972 as the Freshman Year Program at The New School. It allowed high school seniors, and occasionally juniors, to earn college credit in small seminar courses before transferring to four-year institutions. The first class had just under 50 students.

In 1975, the university launched the Seminar College, the direct predecessor of Eugene Lang College. Its curriculum expanded as enrollment grew and came to include accelerated BA-MA programs, fieldwork, internships, study abroad, and exchange courses with other New York universities.

In 1985, philanthropist and New School trustee Eugene M. Lang donated $5 million to the institution. The gift enabled the Seminar College to become a full school of the university, which was renamed Eugene Lang College of Liberal Arts in his honor. The college currently has an enrollment of over 1,555 students.

In 2005, the phrase "The New School" was inserted into the name of each division of The New School as part of a unification strategy initiated by the university's President Bob Kerrey; thus, Eugene Lang College was renamed Eugene Lang College The New School for Liberal Arts. In 2015, The New School rebranded again by renaming the schools to better clarify the relationship between the university and its schools. Eugene Lang College's formal title is The New School's Eugene Lang College of Liberal Arts.

== Curriculum ==
The primary academic building for Eugene Lang College

The only required classes are a first-year and two semesters of Writing the Essay for first-year students. These writing classes have titles such as "Memory and the Self," "Poetry and the Conditions of Possibility," "Human Rights," and "Technology, Surveillance, and Climate Change."

The college places emphasis on interdisciplinary learning with a "student-directed" curriculum. All of its courses are seminars. Students at Lang may also cross-register for courses sponsored by other divisions of The New School, including Parsons School of Design and The New School College of Performing Arts. Students are allowed to double-major, minor in programs across The New School, and enroll in the bachelor's/master's program, which allows Lang students to complete a BA and MA through The New School's graduate programs.

== Student publications ==
Several of The New School's major publications are produced by Lang students. Among these are:

- The New School Free Press, a student-run newspaper published by the journalism concentration of the Writing department, has grown from a DIY zine-style pamphlet to a professionally-printed broadsheet in the years since its founding in 2002, when it was known as Inprint. It is published monthly in print and aims to serve both Lang and the wider New School community. The Free Press operates a blog and makes digital copies of the newspaper available on the Lang website.
- 12th Street, literary journal; contains works from undergraduate writers in The New School's Riggio Writing & Democracy Honors Program
- Eleven and a Half, the literary journal of Eugene Lang College
- The Weekly Observer, an online newsletter about student and alumni achievements, program announcements, and other university-wide news. Distributed via MyNewSchool web portal.

== Notable alumni and faculty ==
=== Alumni ===
- Nina Arianda, actress
- Zeba Blay, writer and critic
- Bethany Cosentino, musician of Best Coast
- Paul Dano, actor
- Borzou Daragahi, journalist
- Ani DiFranco, musician
- Elisa Donovan, actress
- Mike Doughty, musician
- Jude Ellison Sady Doyle, feminist writer
- Stacey Farber, actress
- Melissa Febos, writer
- Anita Glesta, artist
- Emily Gould, former co-editor of Gawker
- Kevin Jon Heller, scholar of international criminal law
- Jillian Hervey, musician and dancer
- Travis Jeppesen, writer
- Graeme K., musician
- Karen Maine, director and screenwriter
- Matisyahu, musician
- Roy Scranton, writer and environmentalist
- Sufjan Stevens, musician
- Jake Shears, musician
- Robert Schwartzman, musician and actor
- Julio Torres, writer, comedian, actor
- Alberto Toscano, philosopher and social theorist
- Lisa Unger, novelist

=== Faculty ===
- Jennifer Baumgardner, feminist writer and speaker
- Laurie Collyer, director/actress
- Siddhartha Deb, novelist
- Jill Eisenstadt, novelist, screenwriter, and journalist
- Jennifer Gilmore, novelist
- Neil Greenberg, dancer and choreographer
- Joseph Heathcott, urbanist and artist
- Shelley Jackson, novelist and short story writer
- Margo Jefferson, former theatre critic at The New York Times
- Hettie Jones, poet
- Barrie Karp, artist
- Talia Lugacy, filmmaker
- Greil Marcus, music critic
- Miller Wolf Oberman, poet
- Dominic Pettman, writer and theorist
- Kristin Prevallet, poet and writer
- Katy Pyle, dancer and choreographer
- Sara Ruddick, feminist philosopher
- Lynda Schor, short story writer and literary editor
- Christopher Sorrentino, novelist, short story writer
- Mark Statman, writer, translator, poet
- Sekou Sundiata, Grammy-nominated performance artist, poet
- Elizabeth Swados, writer, composer, musician, and theatre director
- McKenzie Wark, virtual media theorist
- Caveh Zahedi, director/actor

== Rankings ==
In some college ranking programs, The New School's eight divisions are ranked separately, since their attributes and standards of admission differ significantly.

The Princeton Review ranks Eugene Lang among "America's 371 Best Colleges" and the "Best Northeastern Colleges.". Miriam Weinstein also cites the Eugene Lang division in her book, Making a Difference Colleges: Distinctive Colleges to Make a Better World. Lang has also appeared on The Princeton Review's following national lists:

- "Dodgeball Targets" (#1)
- "Great College Towns" (#1)
- "Intercollegiate Sports Unpopular Or Nonexistent" (#1)
- "Class Discussions Encouraged" (#1)
- "Long Lines and Red Tape" (#1)
- "Students Most Nostalgic For Bill Clinton Politics" (#2)
- "Least Religious Students" (#2)
- "Nobody Plays Intramural Sports" (#2)
- "Birkenstock-Wearing, Tree-Hugging, Clove-Smoking Vegetarians" (#3)
- "Most Politically Active" (#7)
- "Town-Gown Relations Are Great" (#11)
- "Gay Community Accepted" (#13)
- "Most Liberal Students" (#16)
- "Students Dissatisfied with Financial Aid" (#18)
- "Lots of Race/Class Interaction" (#19)

== See also ==
- Education in New York City
- The New York Intellectuals
- The New York Foundation
- Project Pericles
- National Book Award
