= School of Drama (The New School) =

Coordinates: 40.73617°N 74.00909°W

School of Drama at The New School
- Type: Graduate Undergraduate
- Established: 2005
- Affiliations: The New School
- Director: Pippin Parker
- Academic staff: 39
- Administrative staff: 12
- Postgraduates: 61
- Location: 151 Bank Street New York, NY 10014, New York City, NY, USA
- Campus: Urban
- Website: drama.newschool.edu

School of Drama at The New School is a multidisciplinary training program for theater arts, located at 151 Bank Street, and 55 West 13th Street New York City, It is a part of The New School's College of Performing Arts.

== History ==
The graduate program was established in 2005 and grants Masters of Fine Arts degree in acting, directing and playwriting. Its early predecessor was the Dramatic Workshop (1940–49).

The undergraduate program was established in 2013 and offers students a multidisciplinary, studio-driven program that combines courses in acting, directing and playwriting. The four-year program grants a BFA in the Dramatic Arts.

== Programs ==
=== Masters Program ===
The earlier logo as The New School for Drama

The New School's theatrical MFA program was founded in 1994 in association with the Actors Studio. The program existed as the Actors Studio Drama School until 2005, when the contract with the Studio came to an end.

Following the split, New School President Bob Kerrey announced that the program would continue without the Studio as the New School for Drama, with Robert LuPone as Director. As a consequence, the classes of 2006 and 2007 enrolled in the Actors Studio Drama School, and graduated from the New School for Drama. 4 The program is a three-year intensive, offering Masters of Fine Arts in Acting, Directing or Playwriting. The curriculum is highly collaborative, with students from all three majors working closely together.

Faculty

Current faculty for the MFA program includes Christopher Shinn, Jon Robin Baitz, Daniel Aukin, Peter J. Fernandez and Michael Weller.

Artist-in-Residence

For the 2014–15 school year Mark Ruffalo was School of Drama's artist in residence. Previous artists in residence have included David Hare (2013–2014), Kathleen Chalfant, playwrights Jon Robin Baitz (2009–10) and John Patrick Shanley (2006–07), director Doug Hughes (2007–08), and actor John Turturro (2008–09).

=== Undergraduate Program ===
School of Drama's undergraduate program welcomed its inaugural class in August 2013. The inaugural class of 2017 comprises fifty young artists studying the disciplines of acting, directing, playwriting, and the Creative Technologies.

Curriculum

The BFA in Dramatic Arts is a multidisciplinary, studio-driven program that combines courses in acting, writing, directing, aesthetic inquiry, and creative technologies and provides artistic training and project-based learning in various media. Students may choose a focus and may also choose electives in various theatrical disciplines.

Professional Training

The professional training provided by the program includes foundational courses, theater electives, general electives, research methods studios, reflective learning opportunities, performance and production opportunities, and a collaborative capstone experience.

Global Perspectives

BFA students make connections between concept and practice, and gain an increased familiarity with the works and intentions of playwrights, directors, and performers in both the Western and non-Western worlds.

Part of The New School

BFA students at School of Drama can take classes at Parsons and Eugene Lang College. Students can also choose a minor at Lang.

=== Productions ===
- The Hot L Baltimore by Lanford Wilson, directed by Shelly Wyant (Fall 2013)
- New Works Play Festival (Spring 2013)
- An Enemy of the People by Henrik Ibsen, translated by Arthur Miller (Spring 2014)

== See also ==
- Education in New York City
- The New York Intellectuals
- Education in New York City
- The New York Foundation
- Project Pericles
- National Book Award
