= Fogelman Social Sciences and Humanities Library =

Coordinates: 40.73656°N 73.99647°W

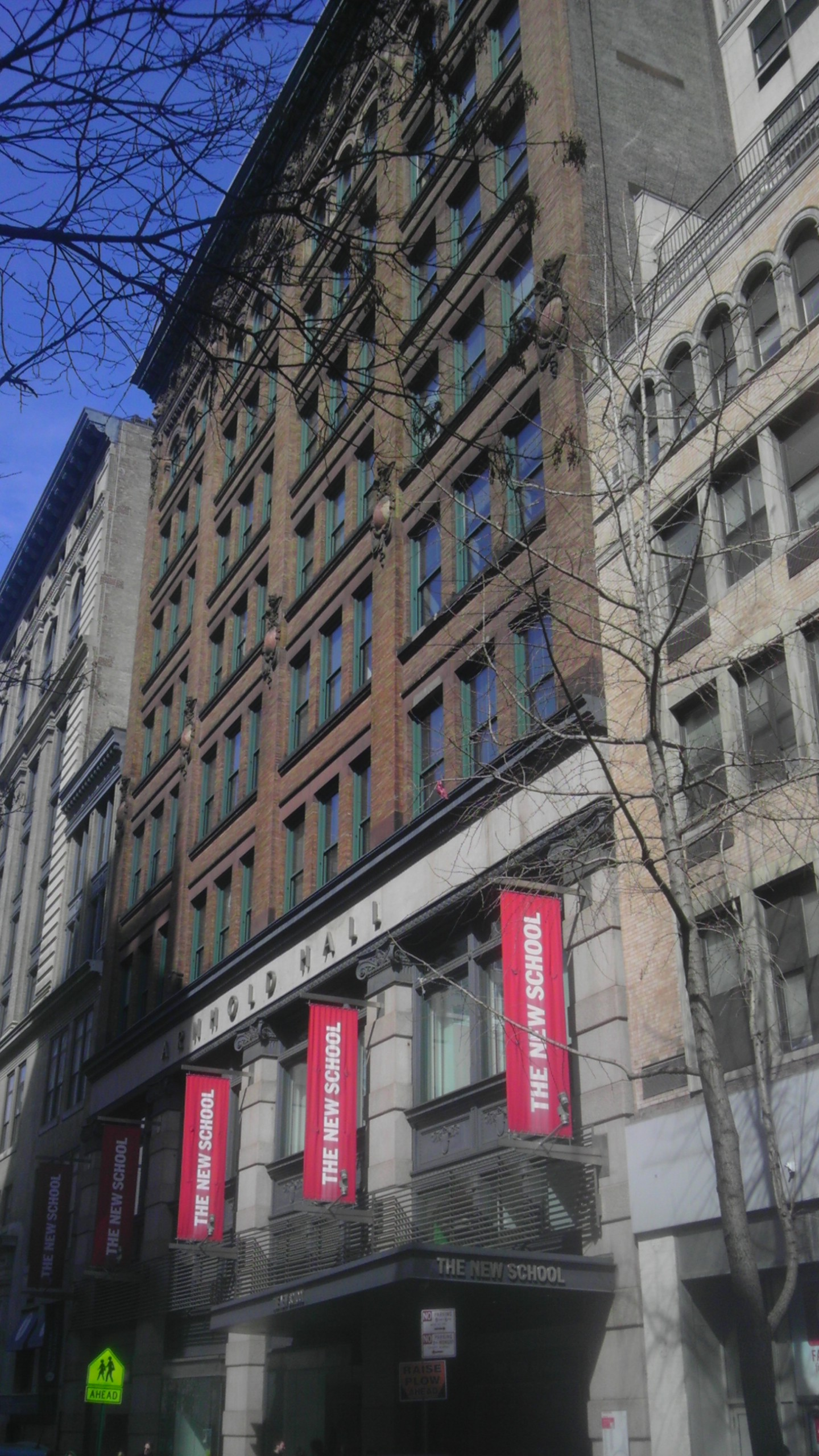
Arnhold Hall, 55 W 13 St

The Raymond Fogelman Social Sciences and Humanities Library was the flagship library of The New School university. It was located at 55 West 13th Street, in New York City's Greenwich Village.

== Founding and Closing ==
The library was located at 55 West 13th Street, better known as Arnhold Hall. The library moved to that location when 65 Fifth Avenue was demolished. Until that time Arnhold Hall had been the main academic building for The New School for Jazz and Contemporary Music. The move caused controversy among student activists, who demanded additional study space.

On November 26, 2014 the Fogelman Library at Arnhold Hall was closed and the collection moved to the List Center Library at 6 East 16th Street. The List Center Library consolidated the collection into a single floor. Collections such as music scores, scripts for plays, and books about music, theater, and dance moved to Arnhold Hall on the 2nd & 9th floors, but were renamed the Performing Arts Library.

== Collection ==
Prior to its closing, Fogelman held The New School's largest collection with 150,350 tangible items and 1,580,310 digital ones. The New School Libraries now maintain three library locations: the University Center Library, the List Center Library, and the Performing Arts Library.

== Art Collection ==
Several key paintings in The New School Art Collection were kept at Fogelman and remained in place after the library closed and the space was repurposed by The New School. Among these is Event Horizon, a floor-to-ceiling, wrap-around, black-and-white wall mural by Kara Walker. The piece was commissioned by Stefano Basilico and the Committee for the University Art Collection in 2003 but not completed until 2005. It was Walker's first permanent public commission and comments on America's history of racism and slavery. In the center of the stairwell is a large sculpture meant to complement Walker's piece.

== See also ==
- Education in New York City
- National Book Award
- The New York Intellectuals
- The New York Foundation
- Project Pericles
