= Milano School of Policy, Management, and Environment =

Public policy school of The New School

Coordinates: 40.73560°N 73.99433°W

Milano School of Policy, Management, and Environment at The New School
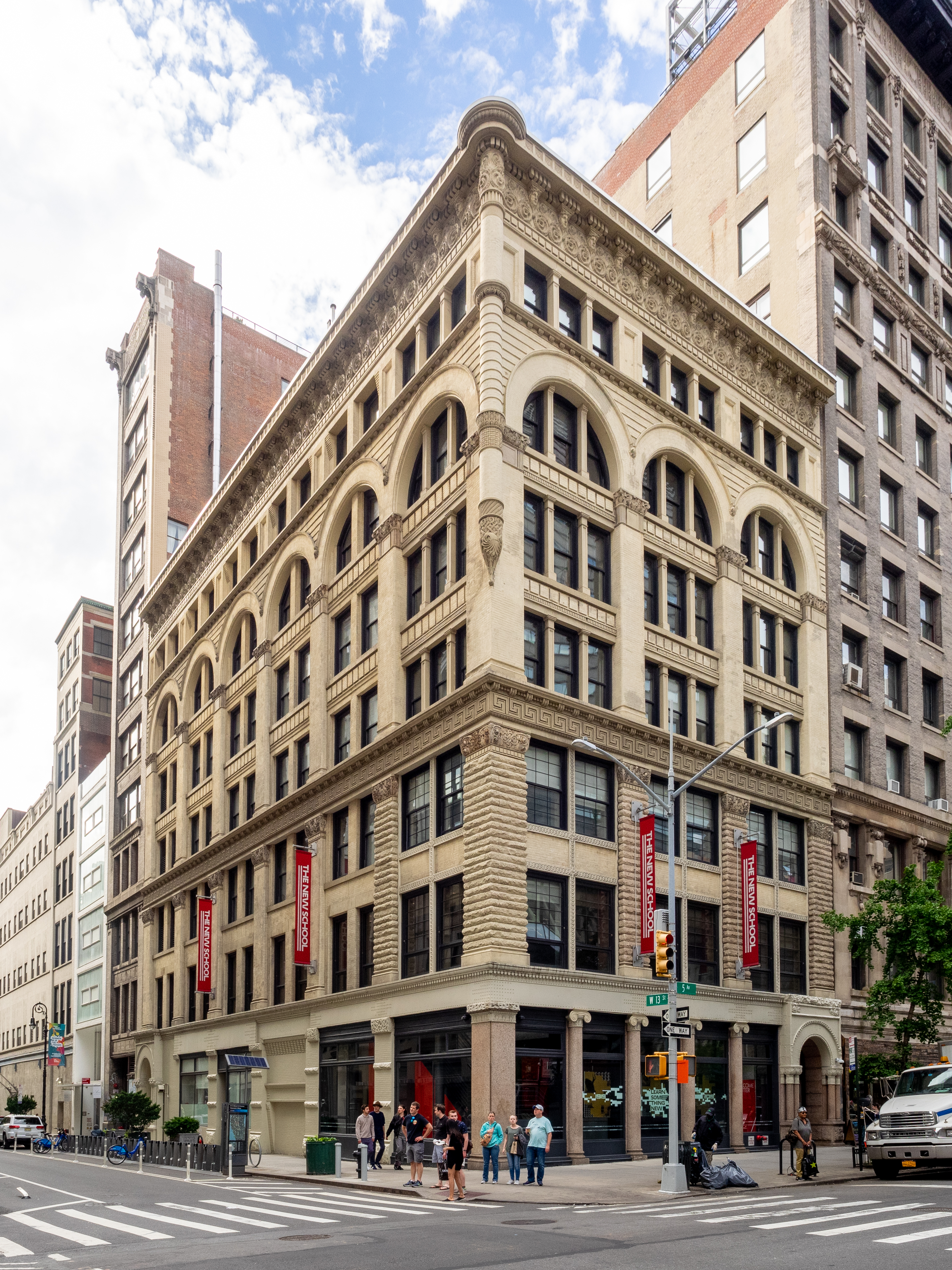
- Type: Private
- Established: 1975
- Postgraduates: 800
- Location: 72 5th Avenue, Manhattan, New York City, New York, United States
- Dean: John Clinton
- Colors: New School Orange,
- Nickname: Milano
- Website: www.milanoschool.org

Milano School of Policy, Management, and Environment was a graduate school at The New School within The Schools of Public Engagement, offering degrees in environmental policy and sustainability studies, nonprofit management, organizational change management, public policy and urban policy, as well as a PhD program in public and urban policy and three graduate certificates.

In 2025, after university-wide restructuring, The Schools of Public Engagement ceased operations as an independent academic division within The New School. Programs administered by the Milano School of Policy, Management, and Environment moved under The New School for Social Research and Parsons School of Design.

== History ==
In 1964, The Center for New York City Affairs, a nonpartisan institute, also known as J. M. Kaplan Center for New York City Affairs was founded as the first teaching and research center in the United States devoted to the study of a single metropolitan area.

In 1975, under the leadership of Dean Henry Cohen, the Kaplan Center evolved into the Robert J. Milano Graduate School of Management and Urban Policy (now the Milano School of International Affairs, Management and Urban Policy), which was named in honor of the former New School trustee Robert J. Milano (1912–2000), who had also been a member of the advisory board of the J.M. Kaplan Center.

In spring 2024, the university administration informed faculty members of university-wide restructuring plans, including plans to close down the Schools of Public Engagement as an independent academic division within the broader university structure. Subsequently, starting with the 2025-2026 academic year, programs formerly offered by the Schools of Public Engagement, were merged with a number of other academic divisions composing The New School. As for the programs administered by the Milano School wing of the Schools of Public Engagement, its Public and Urban Policy MS and PhD programs moved to The New School for Social Research and its MS program for Environmental Policy and Sustainability Management, as well as its certificate program for Sustainability Strategy were moved to the Parsons School of Design.

== Academics ==
Milano used to offer the following Master's Degrees:

- MS in Environmental Policy and Sustainability Management
- MS in Nonprofit Management
- MS in Organizational Change Management
- MS in Public and Urban Policy

Milano also offered Graduate Certificates in Organizational Development, Sustainability Strategies, and Leadership and Change.

Students in any master's program at the Milano School could pursue one of the following specializations or work with a faculty advisor to develop their own. The subject areas were sets of related courses that can help students tailor their graduate programs to their personal goals.

- Applied Quantitative Methods and Data Visualization
- Community Development Finance
- Economic and Workforce Development
- Finance
- Food and the Environment
- Global Management
- Global Urban Futures
- Housing and Community Development
- Leadership and Change
- Leading Sustainability
- Politics, Media, and Advocacy
- Social Entrepreneurship
- Social Policy

Before the 2025 restructuring, Milano also offered a PhD Program in Public and Urban Policy, and a joint BA/MS program with Eugene Lang College The New School for Liberal Arts and with the Bachelor's degree in The Schools of Public Engagement.

== Accreditation ==
The Public and Urban Policy program is accredited by the Network of Schools of Public Policy, Affairs, and Administration.
