= Maigret's Boyhood Friend =

1968 novel by Georges Simenon

Maigret's Boyhood Friend (French: L'Ami d'enfance de Maigret) is a 1968 detective novel by the Belgian writer Georges Simenon featuring Jules Maigret of the French Judicial police. It was written 17-24 June 1968 in Épalinges, Switzerland, has been translated into German, Italian, and English, and adapted for television at least three times. Given Simenon's complex bibliography, it is either the 69th or 73rd of the series. The US edition was published 16 September 1970 by Harcourt Brace Jovanovich.

== Synopsis ==
Maigret has not seen his friend Léon Florentin, the class clown from lycée (high school) since a chance meeting in the streets two decades previously. (Maigret's memories of people he had known early in life tend to be sad, given that most, unlike himself, had not made anything of their lives.) Léon comes to his office with a tangled tale. The woman with whom he had been living in an open relationship, Joséphine Papet, has been shot to death. She had had (excluding himself) four lovers, of whom only Florentin and one of the four knew that they were not the only ones supporting her. Mme. Blanc, the formidable and shrewish concierge, maintains that only Florentin had entered the building that night, but in fact everyone had the opportunity. Maigret arranges a confrontational meeting of this intricate cast to see what shakes out. This leads to break in the case when he searches her apartment and discovers 2,200 francs. She had been bribed to keep quiet, and after the meeting shrewdly demanded more. Maigret presses Florentin, who had been a compulsive liar in adolescence, and he comes clean. Lamont had been using the letters of one lover to blackmail another, who had figured out that Lamont was the culprit and had come Lamont and Joséphines flat to confront him. In a fit of rage he had grabbed Joséphine's gun from a drawer to threaten Lamont, accidentally shooting her in the neck.

== Reviews ==
Kirkus Reviews, whilst finding Simenon's usual "sober meticulousness" admirable, considered it "really only comme ci comme ca, or would that be mais si mais non". (sic) [Like this and that... But yes but no.] The Saturday Review was more enthusiastic with the blurb "As usual, while other writers flail away at huge lumps of story and end up with rhinestones, Simenon works small and produces a diamond."

== Gallery ==
Allier department, where Maigret spend his boyhood

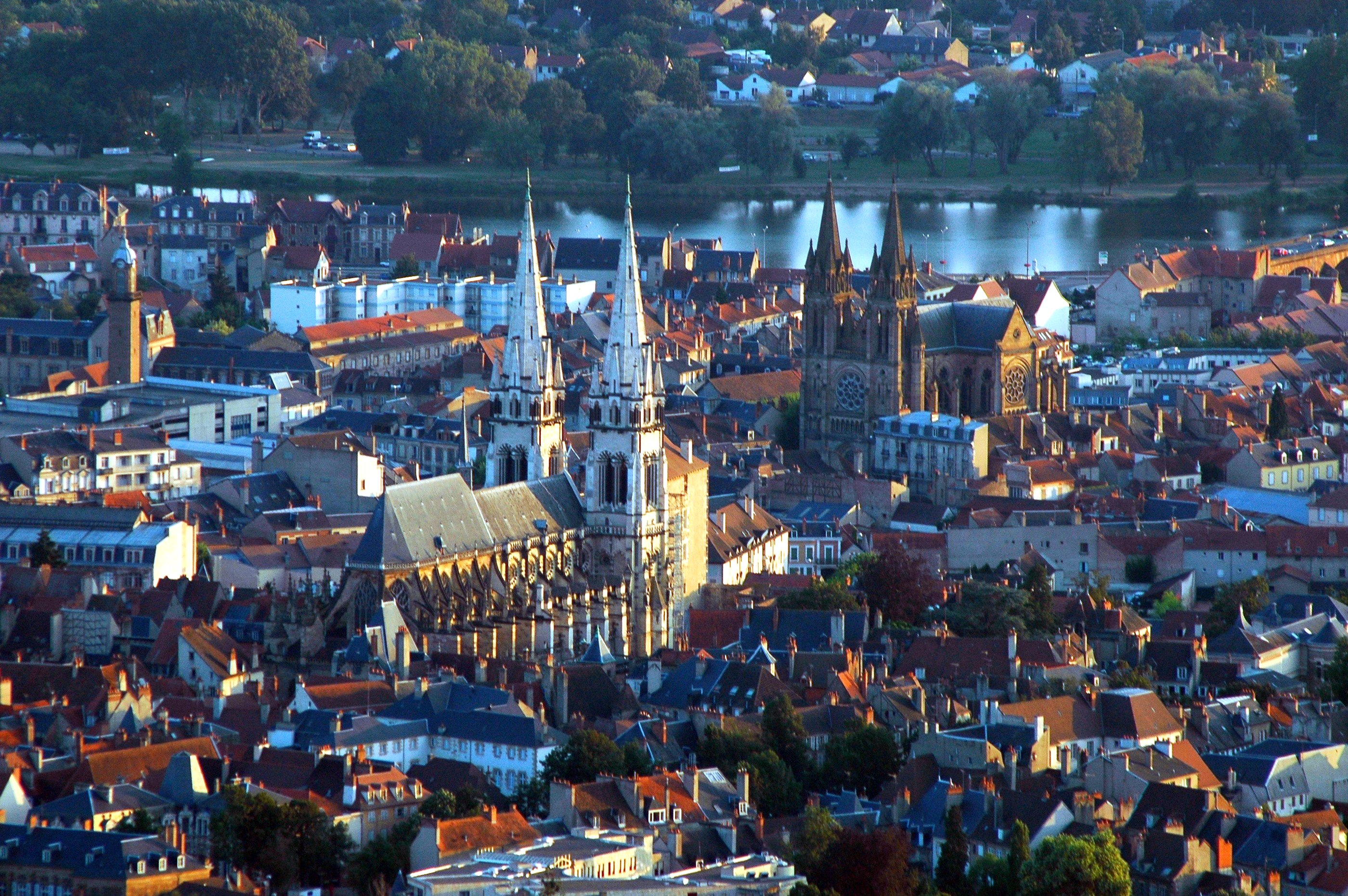
Moulins, Maigret's hometown

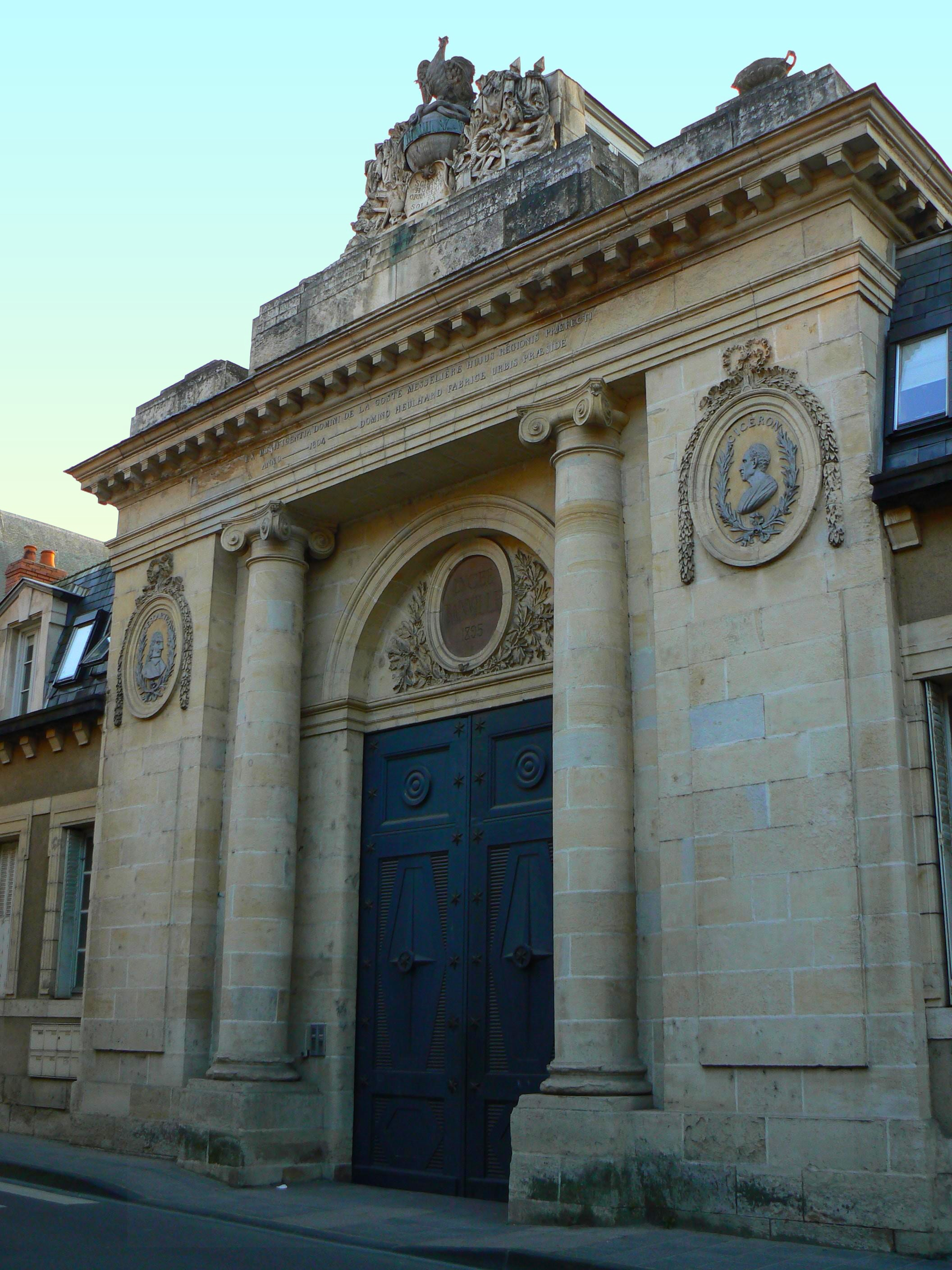
Lycée Théodore-de-Banville, Moulins

== See also ==
- Review in Le Figaro (in French)
