= Statman =

Statman is a surname. Notable people with the surname include:

- Andy Statman (born 1950), American musician
- Mark Statman (born 1958), American writer
- Richard Statman (born 1946), American computer scientist
- Tamara Statman (born 1956), Israeli softball player
