= Richard Brown (film studies educator) =

American educator of film studies

Richard W. Brown (born 1943 or 1944) is a retired American educator (Note: General news sources often referred to Brown as a professor. But given that he did not have a doctorate and taught non-credit courses in adult education, whether he actually held that rank is unclear. A course bulletin biography from the New School did not use the term, while one from his second stint at NYU did.) of film studies, most known for conducting very large non-credit adult education courses at The New School for Social Research from the mid-1970s through mid-1990s in which he screened films in advance of their release and conducted in-class interviews with the films' creators and stars. He also taught a similar course during two stints at the New York University School of Continuing Education. On television, Brown hosted two series on the AMC cable channel, Reflections on the Silver Screen and Movies 101.

== Early life and education ==
Brown grew up in Queens, New York City, the son of a paint store owner. He graduated from Flushing High School there.

He then attended Bard College for a time but left. At times during his early life he worked as an advertising account executive and as a fashion photographer.

After a couple of other educational stops, he ended up in NYU film school, where he studied film directing. He graduated from there in 1967, with a Bachelor of Fine Arts degree. (Note: According to a course bulletin biography, at some point Brown also received an "M.C.A., Creative Writing Scholar" degree from NYU.)

== Courses at New York University ==
After receiving his undergraduate degree, NYU then hired Brown onto their faculty, where he taught film history. By 1969, he was teaching at their School of Continuing Education. (Note: Which school and what kind of faculty position Brown had in his initial couple of years at NYU is unclear and sources are sometimes in contradiction.) Brown invited a neighbor, the writer and performer Mel Brooks, to his class to speak, which started off his idea of bringing in cinema figures. Film actors to visit his class in these NYU years included Robert Redford and Shirley MacLaine, while film directors included Robert Altman. At this point the class was known as "The Filmmakers". (Note: Aside from those duties, during a Monroe County, New York, obscenity trial against exhibitors of the 1973 film The Devil in Miss Jones, Brown testified to the literary and artistic ambitions of the work.)

In 1974, Brown departed NYU in a dispute over the expenses he was incurring for the class.

== Courses at The New School ==
Brown began teaching at The New School for Social Research in 1974. The New School was well known for its assortment of unusual classes aimed at adults and not leading to degrees or certificates.

Brown conducted two different courses, "Filmmakers on Filmmaking" and "The Electric Mind". (Note: Both names were used at the New School. The class name "Filmmakers on Filmmaking" was first used in 1973, during the NYU years, and "The Electric Mind" in 1974, and both would be granted trademark status.) The latter was differentiated by sometimes covering arts other than film. Students were advised not to take them concurrently, as there was repetition and overlap between them. The classes were taught over fall, spring, and summer semesters. Around 1981, "The Electric Mind" was renamed to "The Creative Mind".

Screening passes for Brown's "The Electric Mind" course, c. 1979

Brown's class was known for showing commercial films, not art or festival films. As part of the class, students were able to see new films several weeks prior to their general release. This was done via Brown renting a theatre in midtown Manhattan for a weekend morning screening, before the film was discussed in class in an evening session later during the week. Part of the idea behind the advance viewings was to allow students to form their opinions before critics weighed in, or as a course bulletin said, "Because we screen them prior to public release, we escape the 'aesthetic tyranny ' of the critics." Film distributors worked with Brown in the hopes of using his affluent enrollment base around the New York metropolitan area to build up good word-of-mouth for an upcoming release. Aspects of filmmaking techniques that were discussed in the evening classes included stages such as pre-production, camera placements, editing, sound scoring, and post-production.

But for many students, the central lure of the class was the celebrity guests who appeared onstage with Brown. One of the early ones at the New School course was the comedienne and actress Lily Tomlin. Lesser-known figures, such as the English actor John Mills, could also be invited. One newspaper story noted that the guests ranged alphabetically from Woody Allen to Susanna York. The actor Richard Dreyfuss was an especially frequent guest, eventually appearing several dozen times.

By 1976, "The Electric Mind" had more than 400 students in attendance. By 1979, with over 500 students often enrolled, Brown's were the most popular classes being given at the New School. Those signing up were not aspiring filmmakers themselves.

The cost for students of either class was $175 per semester in 1981 (equivalent to $620 in 2025). Brown's classes were lucrative for the New School, with an estimate of an annual gross of $750,000 for the three semesters (equivalent to $2,000,000 in 2025), with close to half of that being net proceeds going into the New School coffers. Since each semester featured new films and new stars coming to class, many students took the courses over and over again. Saturday Review called Brown's courses "a blue-chip financial success". In addition to a salary, Brown received a percentage of the course revenues. By the late 1980s, sessions were attended by over 1,000 students. The large audiences for his classes earned Brown some national press visibility.

Short of stature, and lacking movie star looks, Brown nonetheless held the class focus. Press accounts compared his onstage performances to that of a stand-up comic, and characterized him as a "showman par excellence [with] the aplomb of a late-night TV talk-show host." A 1981 newspaper profile portrayed Brown as someone not immune to an exaggerated sense of self-importance. His class was heavily advertised, sometimes with over-the-top copy such as: "In one night, this man will change the way you see motion pictures. In one semester, he will change the way you see yourself." The classes were not rigorous in any sense; as Connoisseur magazine observed, "Brown's course is pure show biz. There are no prerequisites, no papers, no tests, and no finals."

One of the volunteer staff: Assistant house manager badge for Brown's "The Electric Mind" course, c. 1979

Students could apply to become one of several categories of volunteer staffers for the courses, such as ticket takers, ushers, or researchers, and as a benefit, attend the films and sessions at no cost. Other staffers were not students but rather learned about the roles from friends and applied. The celebrity guests often sat in the audience until being called on stage, so one staffer task was to make sure appropriate seats were reserved for them. A few of the staff were assigned the role of actually chaperoning the guests. Befitting the presentation-focus of the sessions, the staffers in public-facing positions, such as the ushers, tended to be attractive younger women.

Brown's manner of interacting with his guests found professional criticism among reporters, who saw his approach as embodying softball questions, as well as frequent name-dropping and the overuse of superlatives. The Daily News spoke of his "kid glove treatment to his guests". The New York Times once referred to him as "The ever-fawning Mr. Brown".

Brown's success engendered competition, with by the late 1980s two other schools in the city offering similar programs: the School of Visual Arts with a "Filmmakers Dialogue" course, and NYU with a class entitled "The Filmmakers" and led by the critic William Wolf. Some guests appeared at all three courses; but in any case, Brown's remained the largest and most-advertised of them. And Brown's course had the highest revenues of any adult education course in New York City. By the early 1990s, Brown's class was being called "The Filmmakers Series".

Brown's time at The New School came to an end in 1995 when the parties had a split. Brown subsequently said he had been fired because his artistic aesthetic was too populist for the school.

== Return to New York University ==
Unaffiliated with any institution, over the next years Brown sometimes staged his course in various movie theatres themselves. These sessions, under the name "Movies 101", featured actors such as Dennis Quaid.

Then in 2004, Brown's course returned to its original starting point, the New York University School of Continuing and Professional Studies, continuing with the new name of "Movies 101". As before, it featured major guests. It continued to draw hundreds of students to it, with sessions given in the Skirball Theatre. The "Movies 101" course may have continued until at least 2009.

At some point around 2011, Brown was the instructor for a shorter course at the School of Continuing and Professional Studies, "Private Screenings with Richard Brown", which featured screenings and discussions with stars of past films they had been in. It was also a non-credit course.

== Television series ==
Brown was featured on several different television programs over the years. These included a local cable show, and appearances on Way Off Broadway on Lifetime.

He is most known for two shows on the AMC cable television channel. The series Reflections on the Silver Screen began in 1990. It featured Brown interviewing stars of the classic Hollywood film era, such as Audrey Hepburn and Gregory Peck. (Note: The conversations of Reflections on the Silver Screen were edited down for television broadcast, but with an arrangement that tapes of the full interviews would be donated to the Library of Congress. A similar arrangement was to be made for Movies 101. But whether this has happened is unclear: as of 2026, there seems to be no mention of such an archive on the Library of Congresss website.) As with his class sessions, the interviews were non-confrontational; Brown told the Los Angeles Times, "We protect the talent. ... [The show] is not a tribute, it is an intelligent investigation of their lives, but done with affection, respect and intelligence." The series ran through 1996.

Later, in conjunction with the return of his classes to NYU, the series Movies 101 ran on AMC from 2005 to 2006, comprising two seasons. It featured filmed and edited versions of some of those NYU classes. In addition to actors, including multiple appearances from George Clooney, it featured guests such as the director Martin Scorsese. The nature of the show brought comparisons to James Lipton's better-known Inside the Actors Studio. In a repackaged form, some of the "Movies 101" episodes were released on DVD in 2007.

== Awards and honors ==
The final season of Reflections on the Silver Screen was nominated for a CableACE Award for Talk Show Series at the 18th CableACE Awards in 1996.

In 2009, Brown was an honoree at the Berkshire International Film Festival.
