= Anita Glesta =

American installation artist

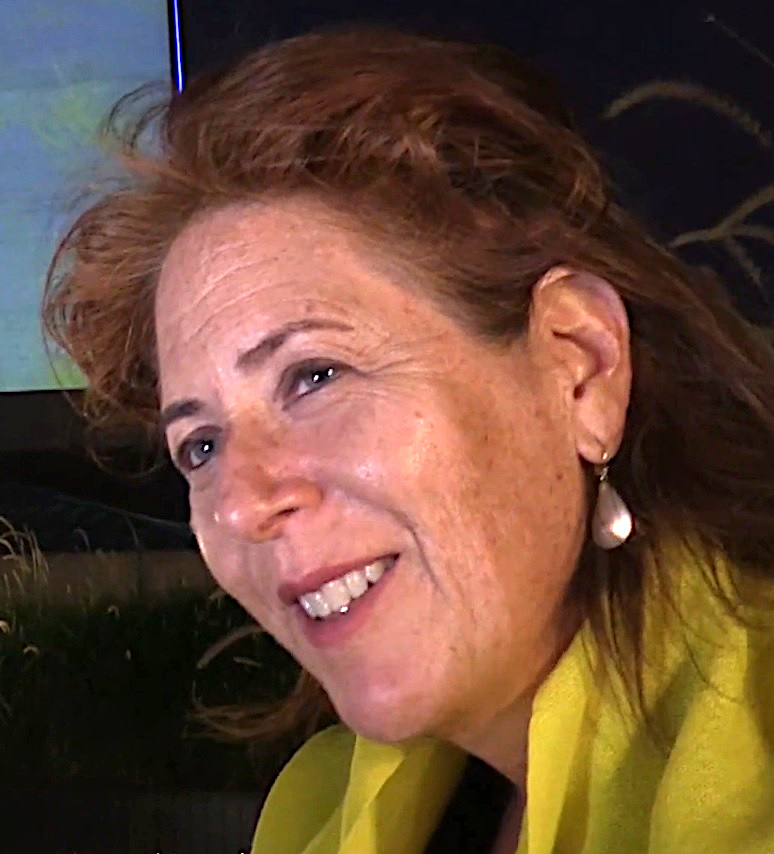
Anita Glesta, Watershed, National Theatre, London 24 Sept 2015

Anita Glesta (née Curtis born January 21, 1958) is a New York City-based multimedia artist best known for her installations in the public and alternative venues internationally. The arch of Glesta’s three- decade long career has occurred in both private and public settings which has included solo and group exhibitions at the Museum of Contemporary Art, Krakow (MOCAK); Peking Museum of Art and Archeology, Beijing; Hudson River Museum, New York; White Colums, New York; Parrish Museum, New York; The Queens Museum, NY, Art Gallery of New South Wales, Sydney, Museo Nacional de Arte y arqueologia, La Paz, Bolivia and many other museums and galleries internationally. Her recent project "UNNERVED', an animation Glesta created during her fellowship at the fEEL Lab at the University of New South Wales School of Art, Architecture and Design, Sydney, Au, appeared on the face of the Australian Center of the Moving Image in Federation Square, Melbourne for the month of October 2022 as part of a festival called “The Big Anxiety" https://www.thebiganxiety.org/ It was later installed at "The Basilica" in Hudson, NY, a renowned performance art venue, as a multi channel art installation encompassing the entire industrial space in July 2023, https://basilicahudson.org/events/a-garden-of-discontent-anxiety-and-wellbeing-in-times-of-crisis/She has been commissioned for a range of high-profile installations, including a video installation on the face of the National Theatre in London and a permanent seven-acre integrated landscape commission for the United States Census Bureau headquarters in Maryland. Her work has also been featured at several museums.

== Education and career ==
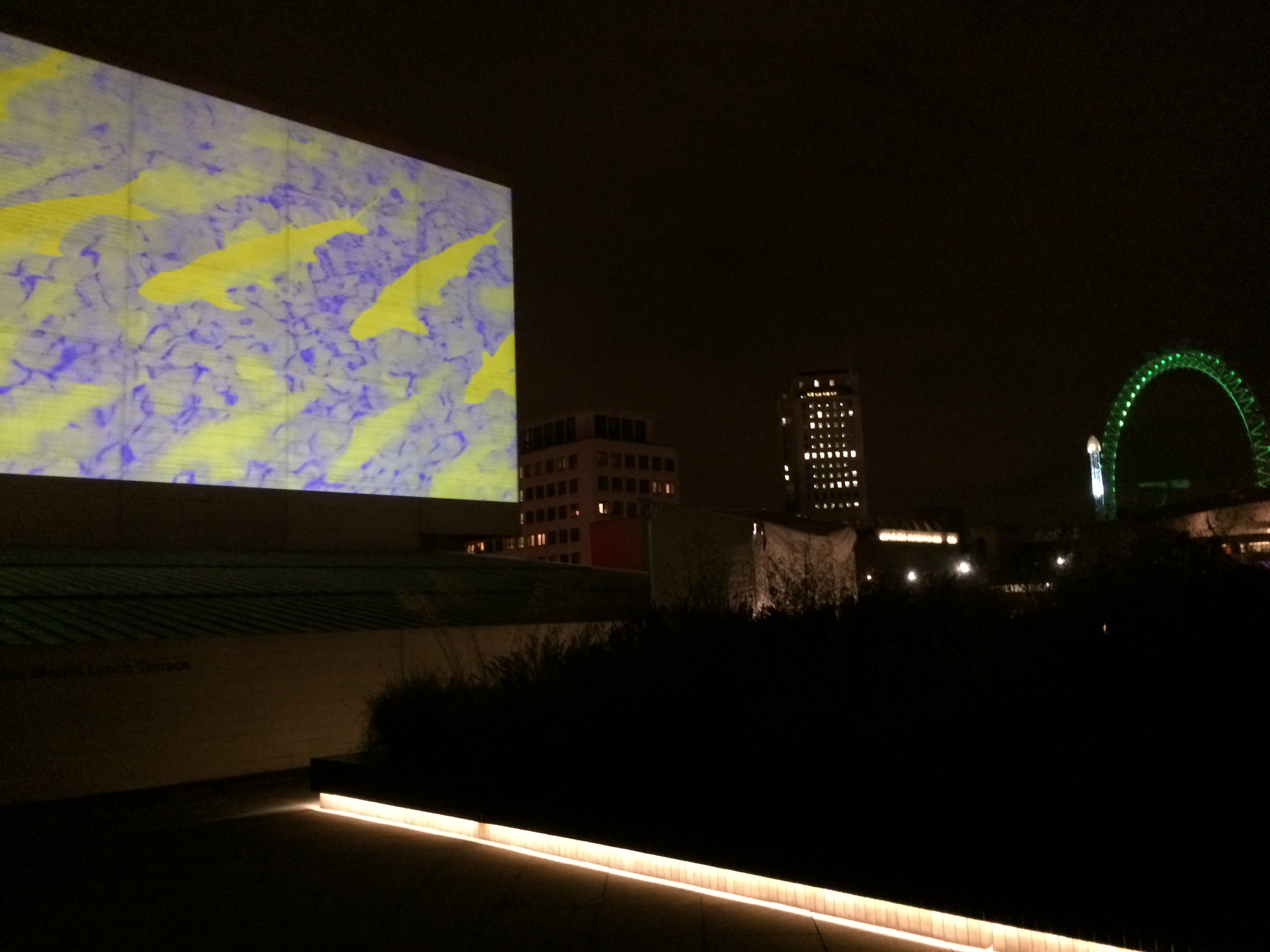
WATERSHED by Anita Glesta at the National Theatre, London, 2015

Glesta completed her undergrad at Eugene Lang College at The New School and Parsons School of Design where she received her B.A. in 1979,9https://dokumen.tips/documents/eugene-lang-college-news-recent-book-civilizing-argentina-science-medicine.html?page=2 and completed graduate studies at the School of the Museum of Fine Arts, Bostonin 1982.In 2020 Anita Glesta was awarded a Laureate fellowship for a PHD at the University of New South Wales fEEL lab https://feel-lab.org/publication_contribu/unsw/. Her research explores the intersection of neuroscience and new media.

Glesta's work has been exhibited extensively in New York City, beginning in 1984 with a solo show at White Columns Gallery. Her work was shown at SculptureCenter, the Queens Museum, the Brooklyn Museum, and many New York galleries before she moved to Sydney in 1994. Since her return to New York in 2000, Glesta has created site-specific works in New York, Europe, and Australia.

In 2004, Glesta was commissioned by the General Services Administration's Art in Architecture Program to create a permanent seven-acre landscape intervention for the Census Bureau Headquarters Building in Suitland, Maryland. https://www.instituteforpublicart.org/case-studies/census/.Six years in the making, on July 12, 2010, Glesta inaugurated her artistic meditation on the idea of counting and numeric order with a global perspective.

Her multimedia installation entitled Gernika/Guernica (2007) commemorates the 70th anniversary of the attack on Gernika by Nazi Germany ordered by the Spanish dictator General Franco. Glesta spent part of her teenage years in Northern Spain in the 1970s and felt an affinity for the experience of political turmoil there, and the legacy of Guernica (Gernika is the Basque spelling). It was her proximity to the September 11 attacks on the World Trade Center that spurred her to develop this body of work where she interviewed the survivors of the bombing of Guernica. The installation was exhibited by the Lower Manhattan Cultural Council at Chase Manhattan Plaza (three blocks from Ground Zero in New York), as well as the Museum of Contemporary Art in Kraków and the Arthur M. Sackler Museum of Art and Archaeology at Peking University, Beijing.

Beginning in 2014, Glesta has been travelling a large-scale video installation entitled WATERSHED to prominent locations in New York and London in an effort to facilitate discussion on climate change and infrastructure improvements in waterfront cities. The video originated from a commission by ARTPORT making waves for their exhibition (Re-) Cycles of Paradise which was commissioned by several UN related organisations and governments for the COP15 UN Climate Conference in Copenhagen in 2009 and which traveled later to Mexico City, Cuernavaca, and Lace Gallery Los Angeles, Ca . There, Glesta learned about the impact of sea level rise on the planet. Sponsored by a fellowship from the LABA Foundation in NYC, Glesta developed THE WATERSHED Project, an installation that later was exhibited throughout the world. The installation itself features footage of fish swimming underwater that is projected onto surfaces in areas that will be affected by impending sea level rise. In 2015, WATERSHED appeared on the National Theatre in London; in 2016, it was commissioned by Al Gore for an event at the New York Custom House on Ellis Island; in 2017, it was projected on the sidewalk outside the Red Hook branch of the New York Public Library.; most recently in 2020, it was projected on the Parrish Art Museum and at the Basilica in Hudson, New York.

== Selected awards and exhibitions ==
- Thames Festival Trust: WATERSHED
- Federal Census Building Commission
- New York Foundation for the Arts Grant
- Lower Manhattan Cultural Council: GERNIKA/GUERNICA
- Pollock/Krasner fellowship
- Black & White Gallery: Pedazos
- Yurong Water Garden
