= Schools of Public Engagement =

Coordinates: 40°44′07″N 73°59′49″W

- Former names: The New School for Social Research (1919–1997); New School University (1997–2005); The New School for Social Research (2005–2011); The New School for General Studies (2011–2015)
- Type: Private
- Active: 1919–2025 (Merged with Parsons School of Design, The New School for Social Research and Eugene Lang College of Liberal Arts)
- Parent institution: The New School
- Accreditation: MSCHE
- Dean: Mary R. Watson
- Students: 1,177
- Undergraduates: 388
- Postgraduates: 789
- Location: New York, United States
- Campus: Urban
- Colors: White, Black, Parsons Red
- Mascot: Gnarls the Narwhal
- Website: newschool.edu/public-engagement/

The Schools of Public Engagement was one of the academic divisions that composed The New School, a private research university located in the Greenwich Village neighborhood of New York City. The college was split into five schools; Milano School of Policy, Management, and Environment; the School of Media Studies; the Julien J. Studley Graduate Programs in International Affairs; the Creative Writing Program; and the Bachelor’s Program for Adults and Transfer Students.

In spring 2024, the university administration informed faculty members of university-wide restructuring plans, including plans to close down the Schools of Public Engagement as an independent academic division within the broader university structure. Subsequently, starting with the 2025-2026 academic year, programs formerly offered by the Schools of Public Engagement, were merged with a number of other academic divisions composing The New School, including Parsons School of Design, The New School for Social Research and Eugene Lang College of Liberal Arts.

== History ==
The Schools of Public Engagement, founded in 1919, was the direct successor of the original institution, making it the oldest divisions of The New School. The school's founding members wanted to create a "center for discussion and instruction for mature men and women," and by 1934 it was chartered as a university by the state of New York and began conferring degrees. The division was restructured in September 2011 to include both the Milano School of Management and Urban Policy in what was then called The New School for General Studies. Beginning in the 2025-2026 academic year, as a result of another university-wide restructuring, the Schools for Public Engagement were closed down as an independent academic division within The New School and its programs merged with a number of other academic divisions within The New School.

=== Growth and change ===
Dean Allen Austill led the division from the 1960s to the 1980s. He was assisted by Albert Landa, who directed publicity for the New School and helped expand the university during a financial crisis, and Wallis Osterholz, who for forty-five years was responsible for much of the day-to-day administration. Austill also added areas such as guitar study and culinary science to the curriculum. In 1962, Austill initiated the Institute for Retired Professionals, a community of peer learners aged 50 to 90 who develop and participate in challenging discussion groups; the institute, now headed by Michael Markowitz, still exists today. Austill's subordinate as Chair of Humanities for many of these years was Reuben Abel, a philosopher. Abel was succeeded by Lewis Falb, a specialist in interwar Paris who broadened the humanities curriculum further. Prominent teachers in this era included the philosopher Paul Edwards; the literary scholars Hasye Cooperman, Justus Rosenberg, and Margaret Boe Birns; the political scientist Ralph Buultjens; and the visual arts instructors Anthony Toney, Minoru Kawabata, and Henry C. Pearson.

=== The 1990s and after ===
The New School, for most of its history, operated as a noncredit institution, serving largely white, middle-class, often politically progressive, often Jewish adults living in Manhattan who were interested in intellectual stimulation and self-improvement. In the early 1990s, the institution, sensing demographic changes and needing to supplement its revenue, began to encourage credit students to matriculate at the institution, a trend which culminated in the establishment of the adult BA program in the mid-1990s. The credit students generally represented a younger and more diverse population.

Several important developments occurred at the institution in the early 2000s. A strong advising program guided the curriculum's transformation from an intellectual free-for-all of courses often taught by teachers with sharply varying credentials to a smaller, more rigorous set of offerings taught by professionals, often bearing the highest degree in their fields. In 2005, as part of the rebranding of the entire university envisioned by President Bob Kerrey, the division was renamed The New School for General Studies, to clarify its mission and perhaps to invite comparisons with Columbia University's prestigious, similarly named School of General Studies. Also in 2005, the New School agreed to a contract with Local 7902 of ACT-UAW, an affiliate of the United Auto Workers, guaranteeing job security to part-time faculty who had taught at The New School for more than ten semesters.

Following the part-time faculty's success in gaining recognition and security, New School students set about creating a university-wide representative body. Many efforts had been made to establish a student legislative body, to address student grievances and concerns, but they were stymied by disconnected university divisions and an unenthusiastic administration. However, the long-standing efforts paid off in the Fall 2006 term when a University-wide Student Senate was formed involving representatives from all of the school's divisions. The USS gained administration support and funding from the board of trustees and is set to ratify a new constitution. Beginning during the Spring 2007 semester, representatives were elected from each division.

Since July 2014, the Schools of Public Engagement were led by executive dean Mary R. Watson.

Several undergraduate and graduate programs at the Schools of Public Engagement at The New School could be completed entirely online or through a combination of online and on-campus study.

=== Restructuring, closure and mergers ===
In spring 2024, the university administration informed faculty members of university-wide restructuring plans, including plans to close down the Schools of Public Engagement as an independent academic division within the broader university structure. Subsequently, starting with the 2025-2026 academic year, programs formerly offered by the Schools of Public Engagement, were merged with a number of other academic divisions of The New School.

More specifically, all the programs formerly administered by the School of Media Studies and a part of the programs operated under the Milano School of Policy, Management and Environment were moved to Parsons School of Design, the programs formerly operating under the Julien J. Studley Graduate Programs in International Affairs, the Creative Writing Program and the other part of the Milano School of Policy, Management, and Environment programs were moved to The New School for Social Research and the Bachelor’s Program for Adults and Transfer Students was moved to Eugene Lang College for Liberal Arts.

== Academics ==
The Schools of Public Engagement offered Bachelor of Fine Arts (BFA), Bachelor of Arts (BA), Bachelor of Science (BS), Master of Fine Arts (MFA), Master of Arts (MA), and Doctor of Philosophy (Ph.D.) degrees. It offered undergraduate programs designed specifically for transfer students, including working adults of all ages, as well as graduate and certificate programs.

The Schools of Public Engagement housed a prestigious MFA program in creative writing, directed by Luis Jaramillo, that has featured such authors as Robert Frost, Frank O'Hara, Marguerite Young, Mira Jacob, and Camille Rankine as instructors.

The division also housed an MA/MS program in International Affairs, directed by Sakiko Fukuda-Parr, and, until 2007, hosted the World Policy Institute, a well-regarded foundation devoted to the study of foreign affairs and formerly led by Stephen Schlesinger.

SPE also offered open-enrollment continuing education courses and certificate programs including Media Management, Film Production, Organization Development, and English as a Second Language.

== See also ==
- The New School
- Milano School of Policy, Management, and Environment

== See also ==
- Education in New York City
- The New York Intellectuals
- The New York Foundation
- Project Pericles
- National Book Award
