= School of Media Studies =

School of Media Studies may refer to:

- School of Media Studies (The New School), part of The Schools of Public Engagement at The New School
- School of Media and Cultural Studies (SMCS), part of the Tata Institute of Social Sciences in India
