= Janet Panetta =

American dancer, teacher, choreographer (1948–2023)

- Born: December 12, 1948; New York City, U.S.
- Died: December 2, 2023 (aged 74); New York City, U.S.
- Spouse: Jeffery Roth (m. 1975)
- Children: 1

Janet Elizabeth Panetta (December 12, 1948 – December 2, 2023) was an American dancer, teacher, choreographer, and performer who made significant contributions to both classical ballet and contemporary dance forms.

== Early life ==
Panetta was born on December 12, 1948, in Brooklyn, New York. Her ballet studies were initiated in 1954 at the age of six as a physical therapy in response to contracting polio in early childhood, which was so severe she had to use an iron lung. Her first teacher was a former showgirl who told Panetta's parents that the seven-year-old Panetta was too talented to be in her class. She moved to study with Celine Keller and then studied at the Metropolitan Opera Ballet School where one of her teachers was her eventual mentor Margaret Craske, a student of the Italian dance master Enrico Cecchetti. Her other teachers at the Metropolitan Opera Ballet School included Antony Tudor and Alfredo Corvino. Panetta started working as Craske's teaching assistant when she was 14 years old.

== Career ==
As a dancer, Panetta was a member of Paul Sanasardo's company after joining the American Ballet Theatre in the late 1960s

Panetta started the Panetta Movement Center in the 1970s and ran the company until 2010.

Panetta's work as a choreographer included performances within Danspace Project. She performed her own choreographic work as well as the choreography of Neil Greenberg, Peter Healey, and others.

In the early 1980s, Panetta was the founding ballet teacher at the National Center of Contemporary Dance in France. One of her students there was the French choreographer Jérôme Bel, who later said of her: "If a dancer would be a rocket, she would be a launchpad...Not telling you where to go, just giving you confidence in the universe." She later was engaged to teach by the Tanztheater Wupperthal, founded in Germany by the groundbreaking choreographer Pina Bausch. Her work in Europe included teaching at P.A.R.T.S. (Performing Arts Research and Training Studio), a school for contemporary dance in Brussels. She also taught at the ImPulsTanz festival in Vienna every summer from 1997–2021.

In 2003, Panetta opened the Panetta Movement Center in Chelsea which centered on her signature method called "Ballet for Contemporary Dancers". The method focussed on natural bodily alignment rather than the extremes of formal ballet. She taught traditional as well as contemporary dancers, inviting all to look at dance foremost as an expression of individuality.

== Personal life ==
Panetta married businessman Jeffery Roth in 1975. Together they had a son.

Panetta died of brain cancer in Brooklyn on December 2, 2023.

== Honors and awards ==
In 2008, Panetta was awarded the Mid-Career Award from the Martha Hill Dance Fund.
