= School of Jazz and Contemporary Music =

New York City music school

Coordinates: 40.73656°N 73.99646°W

- Former names: The New School for Jazz and Contemporary Music
- Type: Private music school
- Established: 1986 (40 years ago)
- Parent institution: The New School
- President: Joel Towers
- Provost: Richard Kessler
- Dean: Keller Coker
- Executive Dean: Stephen Brown-Fried
- Faculty: 120
- Administrative staff: 20
- Students: 287 (fall 2007)
- Location: Greenwich Village, New York City, New York, U.S.
- Campus: Urban
- Colors: Parsons Red
- Website: newschool.edu/jazz

The School of Jazz and Contemporary Music is a private music school of The New School in New York City. It is located on West 13th Street in the neighborhood of Greenwich Village. It was formerly known as The New School for Jazz and Contemporary Music.

== History ==
Earlier logo as The New School for Jazz and Contemporary Music

The School of Jazz and Contemporary Music was founded by David Levy, a former dean of Parsons School of Design, saxophonist Arnie Lawrence, and Paul Weinstein, the first chairperson of the program in 1986, as the Jazz & Contemporary Music Program. The school holds the philosophy that artists should be mentors, thus many teachers are working professionals.

== Academics ==
The School of Jazz and Contemporary Music offers Bachelor of Fine Arts (BFA) degrees in jazz and contemporary music with concentrations in vocal and instrumental performance.

The core curriculum includes courses in performance, improvisation, composition, music history, and liberal arts. In addition, students can select or audition for a wide range of elective courses and narrow their focus as they advance toward graduation.

Students' proficiency on their instruments is evaluated at the start of school. Students who do not place out of proficiency requirements are assigned ten lessons with an instructor deemed appropriate to their needs. Students who place out of proficiency requirements are assigned nine lessons per semester with one or two instructors chosen in consultation with an advisor.

== Faculty ==
All faculty are working musicians in New York City.

== Beacons in Jazz awards ==
Beginning in 1986, the School of Jazz and Contemporary Music has annually recognized jazz musicians and others who have "significantly contributed to the evolution of American music culture" with the Beacons in Jazz award. Recipients have included: Ruth Brown, Hank Jones, Cab Calloway, Benny Carter, Aretha Franklin, Ahmet Ertegun, Dizzy Gillespie, Chico Hamilton, Percy Heath, Milt Hinton, Johnnie Johnson, Jackie McLean, James Moody, Max Roach, Wayne Shorter, Clark Terry, Joe Williams, George and Joyce Wein, Paul Weinstein and Phil Woods.

== See also ==
- Education in New York City
- The New York Intellectuals
- The New York Foundation
- Project Pericles
- National Book Award
