= Henry C. Pearson =

American painter

Henry C. Pearson (October 8, 1914 – December 3, 2006) was an American abstract and modernist painter. Pearson was born in Kinston, North Carolina, graduated from the University of North Carolina in 1938, and studied theatrical design at Yale University. He served in the U.S. Army Air Corps in the Second World War, designing maps for the Okinawa campaign, and then re-enlisted to serve in the US occupation of Japan, where he was influenced by Japanese art and theatre forms. Moving to New York in the early 1950s, he studied at the Art Students League of New York with Reginald Marsh and Will Barnet; he remained friends with Barnet for the remainder of his life. Pearson was loosely associated with the Op Art movement and the famous Responsive Eye exhibition at the Museum of Modern Art in 1965. Other influences were Piet Mondrian and Kasimir Malevich.

Pearson was known for abstract, multi-colored globes; 'stochastic' or chance-generated paintings; paintings modeled on Dogon (West African) sculpture; as well as paintings based on the map work he did in the army. In general, his mode was hard-edged abstraction, although not without traces of humor and whimsy. His works are in the collections of the Metropolitan Museum of Art, the Museum of Modern Art, and the North Carolina Museum of Art.

He taught at The New School for General Studies and the Pennsylvania Academy of Fine Arts for many years.

Pearson was also greatly interested in literature and illustrated several poems by the Irish Nobel Prize–winning poet Seamus Heaney. His correspondence with Heaney, and his comprehensive collection of Heaney books, manuscripts and memorabilia, is now housed at the University of North Carolina.

Pearson died in 2006 after a long illness.
