= Mark Statman =

American writer, translator, and poet (born 1958)

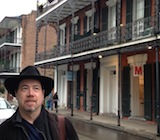
- In New Orleans, February 2013.
- Relatives: Kenneth Koch (father-in-law)

Academic background
- Education: Columbia University (BA)

Academic work
- Discipline: Creative writing
- Institutions: The New School

Mark Statman (1958, New York, NY) is a writer, translator, and poet. He is emeritus Professor of Literary Studies at Eugene Lang College the New School for Liberal Arts in New York City, where he taught from 1985 to 2016. He has published 16 books, 9 of poetry, 5 of translation, and 2 on pedagogy and poetry. His writing has appeared in numerous anthologies and reviews. Statman is a dual national of the United States and Mexico.

== Life ==
Statman was born in New York City and grew up in Queens and Long Island, NY. He studied at Columbia University in New York City with Kenneth Koch, David Shapiro, Barbara Stoler Miller, Burton Watson, and Elaine Pagels, graduating in 1980. His book of translations, Black Tulips: The Selected Poems of José María Hinojosa (2012) (a member of the Generation of '27 and part of the surrealist movement in Spain along with Federico García Lorca), was a finalist for the National Translation Award, 2013. In his preface to Black Tulips, Willis Barnstone wrote, "Statman's exquisite version is our gift." His book of translations of Federico García Lorca's Poet In New York, along with writer and translator Pablo Medina, was called by John Ashbery, "The definitive version of Lorca's masterpiece, in language that is as alive and molten today as was the original." He also has taught creative writing to primary and secondary school students on local and national levels and written extensively on that work, included in his book Listener in the Snow: The Practice and Teaching of Poetry (2000).

Statman has recently translated several contemporary Mexican poets, among them Maria Baranda, Efraín Velasco Sosa Sergio Loo, Araceli Mancilla Zayas, and Marianna Stephania. He has also translated José Emilio Pacheco and Homero Aridjis.

From the mid-1980s to the mid-1990s, in addition to his work as a poet and teacher, Statman worked as a journalist and cultural critic, contributing to, among others, The Nation, 'In These Times, The Guardian, and The Village Voice. He was a Contributing Writer to Cover from 1989 to 1994. He currently writes the influential poetry Substack A Poet in Mexico.

Statman has collaborated with other artists, including painter and writer Katherine Koch and composers Dennis Tobenski and Robin O. Berger.

In November 2017, the board of trustees at The New School promoted Statman to emeritus Professor, making him the first professor given this distinction at Eugene Lang College, the university's undergraduate division.

About Statman's poetry, David Shapiro writes, “It is hard to compare it to anything else,” William Corbett that his poetry is “America's grand plain style descended from William Carlos Williams and James Schuyler,” and Joseph Lease, “Statman gives language as commitment, commitment as imagination, imagination as soul-making.” Anselm Berrigan notes his “spare, concise, searching poems” in which “the present is inexhaustibly on the move.” Joseph Stroud writes “Statman's voice is a kind...that reminds me of the ancient Greek poets of the anthology or the concise voicings of Antonio Machado.” Charles Bernstein: “These are poems of transition as a form of mediation and meditation. Mark Statman's short lines mark the flux of sentiment as openness to what's next.” Paul Hoover: “...realism in the most beautiful sense. We are taken to the living moment as it passes.” Major Jackson: “...an eclectic imagination that redeems the conventional exploits of language and all the dead zones around us...consecrates Statman's forever voice.” Aliki Barnstone calls him “a consummate poet-translator.” In noting the influence of Williams, Pound, and Creeley, the critic Eileen Murphy wrote, of Exile Home, "The book has the almost-hypnotic effect of one big, sprawling poem--reminding me of Whitman's Leaves of Grass or Ginsberg's "Howl."

Of Statman's Hechizo (Lavender Ink, 2022) poet John Koethe called it “an endless source of delight.” Joanna Fuhrman wrote: “His words cast a spell on the reader…” and Michael Anania: “This is a powerful collection, personal, in the most richly evolved sense.” Of Volverse/Volver (Lavender Ink, 2025), Pablo Medina writes: “This is the mature work of a man coming to terms with love, pain, sorrow, mortality, and, yes, God.”

With the publication of Poet in New York in 2008 and the appearance of Tourist at a Miracle in 2010, Statman, who had primarily read his poetry and talked about his work as a teacher of creative writing in the New York City and tri-state area and at academic and professional meetings, began appearing at national and international venues. He has continued to read with the subsequent publications of poetry books and poetry in translation. Among the more prominent sites are the Times Cheltenham Festival (UK), the Miami Book Fair International, US Poets in Mexico, and the Mundial Poético de Montevideo (UY).

Statman is married to painter and writer Katherine Koch, the daughter of poet Kenneth Koch. His son is New York anti-folk musician Cannonball Statman.

In September 2016, Statman retired from teaching to devote himself full-time to writing. He became a Mexican citizen in 2024 and lives in San Pedro Ixtlahuaca and Oaxaca de Juárez, Oaxaca, Mexico.

== Published works ==
- Scenes Left Out Of [….], (version with Efraín Velasco) Lavender Ink/diálogos, 2026, ISBN 978-1-956921-66-3
- The House of Ciervo, Araceli Mancilla Zayas (translation), Aliform Publishing, 2026 ISBN 979-8-2498-6398-2
- Volverse / Volver (poems), Lavender Ink, 2025, ISBN 978-1-956921-45-8
- Chicatanas: Selected Poems, Subpress International, 2023 (published simultaneously as Chicatanas: Antología Personal, translator, Efraín Velaso)
- Hechizo (poems), Lavender Ink, 2022, ISBN 978-1-944884-96-3
- Exile Home (poems), Lavender Ink, 2019. ISBN 978-1-944884-61-1
- Never Made in America: Selected Poems from Martín Barea Mattos (poems, essay, translations), Lavender Ink/Diálogos, 2017. ISBN 978-1-944884-17-8
- That Train Again (poems), Lavender Ink, 2015. ISBN 978-1-935084-81-5
- A Map of the Winds (poems), Lavender Ink, 2013. ISBN 978-1-935084-43-3
- Black Tulips: The Selected Poems of José María Hinojosa (translations, essay) University of New Orleans Press, 2012. ISBN 978-1-60801-088-2
- Tourist at a Miracle (poems), Hanging Loose Press, 2010. ISBN 978-1-934909-16-4
- Poet in New York, Federico García Lorca, (Pablo Medina and Mark Statman, translators), Grove Press, 2008. ISBN 978-0-8021-4353-2
- Listener in the Snow: The Practice and Teaching of Poetry, Teachers & Writers Collaborative, 2000. ISBN 978-0-915924-59-2
- The Alphabet of the Trees: A Guide to Nature Writing (co-edited with Christian McEwen), Teachers & Writers Collaborative, 2000. ISBN 978-0-915924-63-9
- The Red Skyline: Poems, Work and Lives Press, 1987. ASIN B001MK1KKQ

== Awards and fellowships ==
- Virginia Center for the Creative Arts (Fellow—Poetry) March 2007, March 2008, March 2009, December 2009/January 2010, March 2013.
- Poet-in-Residence (Honorary), Poetry Center of Chicago, 2002–2005.
- Jubilee Award, Columbia Scholastic Press Association, Columbia University, NY, 2000.
- Gold Key, Columbia Scholastic Press Association, Columbia University, NY, 1991.
- National Endowment for the Arts Fellowship, 1986–87.
- National Writers Project Fellow, 1984–85.
- Joseph Murphy Fellow, 1976–80.
