= Joseph Heathcott =

American writer (born 1968)

- Born: 1968 (age 57–58); Evansville, Indiana, United States
- Education: Washington University (BA) Indiana University (MA, PhD)
- Occupation: Academic
- Employer: The New School
- Known for: Urbanism; History and Theory of Architecture; City Planning; Urban theory; Cultural landscape; Visual culture; Photography
- Website: heathcott.nyc urbanspacelab.org newschool.edu/parsons/faculty/joseph-heathcott/

Joseph Heathcott (born 1968) is an American writer, educator, scholar, and artist based in New York City. He is a Professor of Urban and Environmental Studies at The New School, where he teaches at Parsons School of Design and the Milano School for Policy, Management, and Environment. He is also the founder and director of the Laboratory for Urban Spatial and Landscape Research. His work spans urbanism, the history and theory of architecture, city planning, urban theory, cultural landscape studies, visual culture, and photography.

== Early life ==
Joseph Heathcott was born in 1968 in Evansville, Indiana, into a working-class Catholic family. Growing up during the 1970s and 1980s. He developed an early interest in the fragility and resilience of urban environments, a passion that he expressed through photography, a skill deeply influenced by his upbringing in a gritty industrial city and his family's experiences with deindustrialization.

== Education ==
Heathcott attended Washington University in St. Louis, where he studied History and Political Theory. During his time there, he also pursued his interests in photography and printmaking, and began exploring Situationist-inspired practices such as agit-prop, détournement, and psychogeography. Influential thinkers he encountered during his studies include Walter Benjamin, James Baldwin, Stuart Hall, and Jane Jacobs. Through the 1980s and 1990s, Heathcott was actively involved with Latin American solidarity, the Catholic Worker movement, and the Anti-Apartheid Movement.

After graduating in 1990, Heathcott received training in community organizing with the Industrial Areas Foundation in the South Bronx and the National Training and Information Center in Chicago. In 1992, he began part-time graduate studies at Indiana University, where he worked on local housing and homeless campaigns in Southern Indiana. He earned an M.A. in Public History in 1996 and a dual Ph.D. in History and American Studies in 2001, studying under John Bodnar, Henry Glassie, and Casey Nelson Blake.

== Academic career ==
Heathcott began his academic career in 1999 as a Visiting Lecturer in the School of Architecture and the Program in American Culture Studies at Washington University. In 2001, he was appointed Assistant Professor of American Studies at Saint Louis University, where he also taught in the Urban Planning program.

In 2007, he joined the faculty at The New School in New York as an Associate Professor of Urban Studies and Faculty Director of Civic Engagement at Eugene Lang College. By 2011, he became part of the newly formed Schools for Public Engagement. Currently, Heathcott is a tenured Professor of Urban and Environmental Studies at the Milano School for Policy, Management, and Environment and Parsons School of Design.

Throughout his career, Heathcott has received numerous prestigious fellowships, including the U.S. Fulbright Distinguished Chair for the United Kingdom, Mellon Distinguished Fellowship in Architecture, Urbanism, and the Humanities at Princeton University, and a Distinguished Visiting Fellowship at the CUNY Graduate Center. He has also taught at several prominent institutions, including the University of the Arts London, Sciences Po in Paris, London School of Economics, and the University of Vienna. Heathcott served as President of the Society for American City and Regional Planning History and has been on numerous editorial boards.

== Scholarly and creative practice ==
Joseph Heathcott is known for his interdisciplinary work in urbanism. His dissertation and early work focused on the interplay between race, class, and the built environment. His first book, Beyond the Ruins: The Meanings of Deindustrialization, co-edited with Jefferson Cowie, reframes the debate on capital flight and its geographies. He has published extensively on topics such as race, housing, and urban planning, and appeared in the documentary The Pruitt-Igoe Myth. Heathcott also co-edited a special issue of the Journal of the American Planning Association for the 75th anniversary of the 1937 Housing Act.

In addition to his academic work, Heathcott has a significant practice in photography and visual culture. His book Capturing the City: Photographs from the Streets of St. Louis, 1900-1930, co-authored with Angela Dietz, examines how municipal officials documented their city through photography. Heathcott's book Global Queens: An Urban Mosaic received the David Coffin Publication. His photographic work has appeared in numerous books, articles, exhibits, and juried art shows, and has been featured in venues such as The Guardian, Domus, and Urban Omnibus, The Journal of the Architectural League of New York.

Heathcott's current work focuses on urban spatial production and landscape forms. He collaborated with Ron van Oers on the UNESCO Historic Urban Landscape approach, publishing a research project on the Swahili Coast of East Africa. His interest in infrastructure led to the publication of The Routledge Handbook of Infrastructure Design: Global Views from Architectural History and Urban Infrastructure: Historical and Social Dimensions of an Interconnected World, co-edited with Jonathan Soffer and Ray Zimmerman. He also continues to show his work in exhibits and juried art shows; most recently he contributed 40 photographs to the exhibit "City of Faith," mounted at the Museum of the City of New York in 2022 and his work was included in a group show at the Museo del Banco de México in 2023. In 2022, Heathcott founded the Laboratory for Urban Spatial and Landscape Research at The New School to support ongoing projects with his Ph.D. students and colleagues.

== Personal life ==
Joseph Heathcott resides in Jackson Heights, Queens, with his partner of over 30 years, Ashley Cruce.

== Selected works ==
- Beyond the Ruins: The Meanings of Deindustrialization (2003), co-edited with Jefferson Cowie
- Capturing the City: Photographs from the Streets of St. Louis, 1900-1930 (2007), with Angela Dietz
- Global Queens: An Urban Mosaic (2017)
- Urban Infrastructure: Historical and Social Dimensions of an Interconnected World (2020), co-edited with Jonathan Soffer and Ray Zimmerman
- The Routledge Handbook of Infrastructure Design: Global Views from Architectural History (2021)
- American Public Housing at 75: Policy, Planning, and the Public Good

== Articles and essays ==
- The House that Antifascism Built. Platform magazine, September 2021.
- Race, Planning, and the American City. Aggregate 3: Black Lives Matter, March 2015.
- The World on a Cup: Coffee from the Kitchen Table to the Global Stage. Montreal Review, January 2015.
- Landscape Entanglements: Toward a New Descriptive Project in Planning Theory. Berkeley Planning Journal 31 (2020)
- Architecture, Urban Form, and Assemblage Aesthetics in Mexico City's Street Markets. International Journal of Architectural Research 13, no. 1, March 2019.
- Public Housing as a Tool of Racial Segregation. In Daniel D'Oca and Tobias Armborst, The Arsenal of Exclusion and Inclusion. Actar Press, 2017.
- The Bold and the Bland: Art, Redevelopment, and the Creative Commons in Post-Industrial New York. City: Analysis of Urban Trends, Culture, Theory, Policy, Action 19, no. 1 (2015).
- The Strange Career of Public Housing: Policy, Planning, and the American Metropolis in the Twentieth Century. Journal of the American Planning Association 78, no. 4 (2012).
- Heritage in the Dynamic City: The Politics and Practice of Conservation on the Swahili Coast. International Journal of Urban and Regional Research 37, no. 1 (2012).
- In the Nature of a Clinic: The Design of Early Public Housing. Journal of the Society of Architectural Historians 70, no. 1 (March 2011).

== Media and interviews ==
- McWhirther, Joshua. "Joseph Heathcott's Global Queens." Interview for Mediapolis: A Journal of Cities and Culture, April 8, 2024.
- Guvenc, Pinar. "Urban Design Amidst Complexities." Interview for "What's the Matter With?" podcast, SOUR Studios, November 10, 2023, released January 20, 2024. (55 minutes).
- Mogilevich, Mariana. "Queens Close Up." Interview with Joseph Heathcott for Urban Omnibus: The Journal of the Architectural League of New York, December 7, 2023.
- "Camera in Hand, Bringing a 'Mash-up' Borough into Focus." Interview with Urban Matters, Center for New York City Affairs, November 15, 2023.
- McGowan, Alan. "Profiles in Sustainability: Joseph Heathcott." Interview with Alan McGowan, Environment magazine, Nov 2022.
- Sarovic, Alexander. "America's Rust Belt and the Rise of Trump." Interview with Der Spiegel, December 24, 2020.
- Perez, Sergio. "Los Tianguis de CDMX." Interview with Vice magazine, Mexico City, October 25, 2018.
- "Mexico's Multicoloured Markets From Above." The Guardian, October 12, 2018.
- "An Urban Data Stream." Photographic feature in Domus magazine, March 2017.
- Paprika!, Yale University School of Architecture. Interview with Joseph Heathcott, April 2017.
- Journal of Arts Writing by Students, Vol. 2, No. 1. Interview with Joseph Heathcott, 2015.
- Greene, Lynnda. "Saints Preserve Us: Can the Idealists Save a City with a History of Selling Its History for the Right Price (or a Parking Lot)?" St. Louis Magazine, May 3, 2007.
