= Pablo Medina =

Cuban American poet and novelist

Pablo Medina is a Cuban American poet and novelist and a professor in the Department of Writing, Literature, and Publishing at Emerson College and director of its MFA program.

== Biography ==
Medina was born in Havana, Cuba, and emigrated to New York City in 1960. He received an M.A. degree from Georgetown University.

Pork Rind and Cuban Songs (1975), Medina's first collection of poems, was the first publication by a Cuban author written directly from the English language. His memoir, Exiled Memories (1990), was the first of several autobiographical accounts to be published from the generation of Cubans who emigrated to the United States after the Cuban Revolution. Medina chronicles early memories from his childhood in Cuba as well as his arrival in New York City; the memoir is a personal reflection on his own self-identity, irreconcilably divided between Cuban and American culture. Among his recent publications are a collection of translated poems by Virgilio Piñera, The Weight of the Island: Selected Poems of Virgilio Piñera (2015) and a collection of original poems, Island History: Poems (2015), The Cuban Comedy (2019).

== Awards and honors ==
- President, Association of Writers & Writing Programs (AWP) Board of Directors, 2005-2006
- Rockefeller Foundation Fellowship in Bellagio, Italy, June 2004
- Distinguished Visitor at the New School for Social Research, 1995-1996
- Lila Wallace-Reader’s Digest Fellowship in Creative Nonfiction, 1993-1994
- National Endowment for the Arts Fellowship Grant in Poetry, 1991
- Jenny McKean Moore Writer-in-Washington, George Washington University, 1990-1991
- Oscar B. Cintas Foundation Fellowship Grant in Poetry and Fiction, 1979

== Works ==
- The Cuban Comedy. The Unnamed Press, 2019.
- Island History: Poems (poems). Hanging Loose, 2015.
- The Weight of the Island (poems in translation). Diálogos Books, 2015.
- Calle Habana (poems). PhotoStroud, 2013.
- Cubop City Blues (novel). Grove/Atlantic, Inc, 2012.
- The Man Who Wrote on Water (poems). Hanging Loose Press, 2011.
- Poet in New York/Poeta en Nueva York (poems in translation, with Mark Statman). Grove/Atlantic, Inc., 2008.
- The Cigar Roller (novel). Grove/Atlantic, Inc., 2005; Spanish Ed., 2005; paperback, 2006.
- Points of Balance/Puntos de apoyo (poems). Four Way Books, 2005.
- Puntos de apoyo (poems in Spanish). Editorial Betania, 2002.
- The Return of Felix Nogara (novel). Persea Books, 2000; paperback, 2002.
- Exiled Memories: A Cuban Childhood (memoir). University of Texas Press, 1990; revised paperback ed., Persea Books, 2002.
- The Floating Island (poems). White Pine Press, 1999. Arabic Ed., 2008.
- The Marks of Birth (novel). Farrar, Straus & Giroux, 1994; German Ed., 1995; French Ed., 1998; paperback, Persea Books, 2003.
- Arching into the Afterlife (poems). Bilingual Review/Press, 1991.
- Everyone Will Have to Listen (poems in translation, with C. Hospital). Linden Lane Press, 1990
- Pork Rind and Cuban Songs (poems). Nuclassics and Science, 1975

== See also ==
- Cuban American literature
- List of Cuban-American writers
