= Lynda Schor =

American writer

Lynda Schor is an American writer known for her satirical feminist short fiction including the collections Appetites, True Love & Real Romance, and her latest, The Body Parts Shop. Her stories have appeared in many literary journals, magazines, and anthologies and have been nominated for many prizes including an O. Henry Award. She is the fiction editor of The Salt River Review and co-fiction editor of The Hamilton Stone Review. She lives in San Miguel de Allende in Mexico and in New York City.
