= Neil Greenberg (choreographer) =

American choreographer (born 1959)

- Born: April 17, 1959 (age 66)
- Occupation(s): Dancer, choreography, educator
- Known for: Founding Dance by Neil Greenberg

Neil Greenberg (born April 17, 1959) is an American dancer, post-modern choreographer, and educator. He danced with the Merce Cunningham Dance Company for seven years, from 1979 to 1986 before establishing his own company, Dance by Neil Greenberg in 1986.

Greenberg's work is characterized by a "choreographic lexicon that integrates kinesthetic, emotional, and cognitive ways of knowing and representing the world and the self".) Within this framework, Greenberg's work deals with the queer male body dancing, a theme that has been implicit throughout his dance making and began to become explicitly identified starting with Quartet for Three Gay Men (2006) and extending into his subsequent dances. Much of the movement in his choreography is based on improvisation and is reflective of his in depth study of somatic techniques, such as Body/Mind Centering, Klein Technique, and Alexander Technique. However, Cunningham's influence can be seen in Greenberg's practice of working with the non-fiction of the body on stage and combining different elements, such as movement, projection, and sound, that leave the responsibility of meaning-making up to the audience. Greenberg has created over 20 works for Dance by Neil Greenberg, as well as additional commissions for Mikhail Baryshnikov's White Oak Dance Project, Ricochet Dance Company, John Jesurun's Chang in a Void Moon, and various colleges across the country. For his work he received a Foundation for Contemporary Arts Grants to Artists award (1997).

== Training and early career ==
Greenberg began dancing at age 4, studying tap at the Nancy Raddatz Dance School, where his older siblings took lessons. At age 11 he began studying ballet and Graham-based modern at the Minnesota Dance Theatre. During this time, Greenberg first saw the Twyla Tharp company, which piqued his interest in post-modern dance. At 17, he left Minnesota to study at Juilliard. He auditioned for the Twyla Tharp company after moving to New York City and was asked to study at the school the company was starting. After his first year at Juilliard, Greenberg danced with the Eliot Feld Company (now known as Ballet Tech) for a summer (where he danced with Mark Morris). After leaving Eliot Feld, he began studying Cechetti Technique with Janet Panetta, whom he studied with, and later assisted, for 13 years. Greenberg danced with multiple choreographers at this time; Patrice M. Regnier and Rush Dance, Rachel Lampert & Dancers, and Manuel Alum. At this time, Greenberg took his first Cunningham class with June Finch. He was drawn to the straightforward, anti-narrative approach of the movement and choreography. At age 20, in 1978, he began studying at the Cunningham studio, and in 1979 he was asked to join the company.

While Greenberg was dancing with Merce Cunningham Dance Company, he began presenting dances at the Cunningham Studio, and later at St. Mark's Church. His dance "Amnesty", that premiered in 1985, was the first work of his to receive substantial attention. It featured Greenberg alongside former Cunningham dancer Louise Burns, as well as Janet Panetta and Susan Blankensop. One critic theorized that perhaps the title was a reference to Greenberg's differentiating himself from the Cunningham Company, which he was still a part of at the time. This hypothesis manifested the following spring when Greenberg made his first piece after leaving the company, entitled "Morphine". His next dance, "Macguffin, or How Meaning Gets Lost" (1987) shows Greenberg's early use of film as inspiration, later seen in his dances "This is What happened" (1999) and "Sequel" (2000). Greenberg has spoken about being influenced by Alfred Hitchcock in terms of using techniques found in suspense films, as well as filmmakers Akira Kurosawa, Federico Fellini and Martin Scorsese. Macguffin was also the first dance of Greenberg's to employ the use of text projections, a device that can be seen in many of his subsequent works.

== Not-About-AIDS-Dance ==
Not-About-AIDS-Dance is the dance that Greenberg is most readily identified with. Premiered in 1994, the year that AIDS became the leading cause of death for Americans between the ages of 25 and 44, as well as the year that Greenberg lost eight of his friends as well as his older brother to AIDS. Greenberg has said that the enigmatic title has to do with his brother, Jon Greenberg, an AIDS activist, who "didn't want his death to be about George Bush or Bill Clinton or even AIDS". In N-A-A-D, Greenberg continues his use of text projections, the projections revealing intimate facts about the dancers onstage. One such fact that is revealed is Greenberg's own HIV status, which he had not previously publicly disclosed. Dance critic Randy Gener wrote that N-A-A-D is an "immortality-project" [a reference to one of the projections in the dance] about a dance in progress- about the haphazard ways the evolution of a piece is disrupted by cruel facts in the universe, about how the road to creation is rife with bumps, digressions, flashbacks, and stark signposts, of which AIDS is one of the most horrifying". The dance has been referenced alongside Bill T. Jones's landmark dance Still/Here, which premiered 6 months after "N-A-A-D." These two dances were the topic of critical analysis of in David Roman's book Performance in America.

=== Not-About-AIDS-Dance, The Disco Project, and Part Three Trilogy ===
"The Disco Project" premiered a year after "N-A-A-D", in 1995. As the title suggests, the dance uses disco music that references the popular culture that was prevalent when Greenberg first came to New York City in the '70s. "Part Three (My Fair Lady)" premiered in 1997, as part of a trilogy with "N-A-A-D" and "The Disco Project". It shared in themes of the other two dances, abstract movement vocabulary paired with snippets of text that underscore the dance with intimacy and loss. A new section of "Part Three", entitled "Judy Garland", was added in 1997, and the final section, "Luck", was added in 1998. The trilogy in its entirety was presented as part of the 92nd Street Y Harkness Dance Project. Critic Ann Daly wrote that the trilogy is like "a serial novel choreographically re-imagined for the age of AIDS", as it tracks the history of the company and the dancers over the course of four years.

=== Not-About-AIDS-Dance Revival ===
Not-About-AIDS-Dance was revived in 2006, the 25th anniversary year of the first reported case of AIDS. While the work had few updates, the fact of 11 years passing gave it a radically different context, due to developments in the lives of the dancers as well as the difference in the role of AIDS in the United States. As one reviewer writes, in regards to the impact of the N-A-A-D revival, "11 years ago it was current events. Now it is history". The practice of reviving dances is uncommon in contemporary dance, and was done out of a necessity that Greenberg felt to revisit it. It was self-produced, something Greenberg claimed he had not done for 20 years, since the beginning of his career. Out of the five dancers in the original cast, including Greenberg, three of them participated in the revival (Greenberg, Ellen Barnaby, and Justine Lynch) and the roles of Jo Mckendry and Christopher Batenhorst were danced by Paige Martin and Antonio Ramos. However the slides were not updated from the time of the original production and still contained information about the original cast members. The revival was presented alongside a new work of Greenberg's, "Quartet with Three Gay Men". This piece was the first work of Greenberg's to feature an all-male cast, and very purposefully so. The movement, derived from videotaped improvisation, includes flamboyant, oft censured affectation. The dance uses RuPaul's song "Supermodel", which Greenberg had been improvising to while creating material for N-A-A-D.

== Use of Mixed Media ==
Projected text has become a signature mark of Greenberg's choreography. The first use of it was in "MacGuffin, or How Meanings Get Lost". It wasn't until "N-A-A-D" that the text became a way to reveal information about the performers. In "Destiny Dance" Greenberg first used video in rehearsal as a way to cull set movement material from his own improvisation. In "Really Queer Dance with Harps" Greenberg expanded from just using his own improvisations to create material that his dancers learned, to deriving movement material from his dancers' improvisations as well.

In addition to the element of projected text, Greenberg delved into the use of video in 2003 with his dance “Two”. A projection on the back wall of the theatre, behind the stage, shows live feed images being captured on stage, as well as footage of Greenberg doing movement material that is taking place simultaneously on stage, but by other dancers. There is also a video monitor on stage that shows footage of various forms of running; horses, people's feet, and a Japanese woman in a kimono. Greenberg's next piece, “Partial View” continued his exploration into media - also using both pre-recorded and live feed video. The prerecorded video was courtesy of theatre artist John Jesurun and was displayed on two screens at the back of the stage. The live feed switched perspectives, from birds-eye views to closeups.

== Commissions and Collaborations ==
Greenberg was first commissioned by Mikhail Baryshnikov to be part of Baryshnikov's White Oak Project in 1998. This commission resulted in “Tchaikovsky Dance”, a piece that contained many elements used previously in Greenberg's work including text projections, and blasts of music (Tchaikovsky) that interrupt long silences. It included the element of non-fiction and allusion to rehearsal processes common to Greenberg's work. One such instance was a snippet of text specifying that the solo for Baryshnikov came when it did in the dance because that was the point in the rehearsal process that Baryshnikov returned from tour. Due to the successful reception of the commission, Greenberg was asked to choreograph again for the White Oak Project the following year, in 1999. For this commission he reworked his 1987 piece "Macguffin, or How Meanings Get Lost". The result was a piece entitled "Macguffin, or How Meanings get Lost (revisited)", which was mostly a solo for Baryshnikov, who was only joined for the last few minutes of the dance by the other White Oak Dancers; Raquel Aedo, Emily Coates, Emmanuele Phuon, Ruthlyn Salomons and Susan Shields. The dance was set to Bernard Herrmann's "Psycho, A Narrative for String Orchestra", a change from the original "Macguffin", which was danced in silence.

In 2002, Ricochet Dance Company in London commissioned Greenberg to create a new work to be shown alongside a piece they commissioned from Stephen Petronio. The piece Greenberg created for them, entitled "POV (Point of View)" also uses the genre of film noir as inspiration, particularly the film "Double Indemnity". It also made use of multi-media in a similar way to some of previous pieces, as it used three cameras to capture live-feed video of the dancers on stage, as well as pre-recorded footage of Greenberg himself
