= The New School College of Performing Arts =

Private music and performing arts college in New York City

Coordinates: 40.735503°N 73.997140°W

College of Performing Arts
- Former names: Mannes School of Music (1916–2015); School of Jazz (1986–2015); School of Drama (1994–2015)
- Type: Private music conservatory
- Established: 2015; 11 years ago
- Parent institution: The New School
- Accreditation: NYSED
- Executive Dean: Richard Kessler
- Academic staff: 630
- Students: 1,010
- Undergraduates: 605
- Postgraduates: 405
- Location: New York, United States
- Campus: Urban
- Colors: White, Black, Parsons Red
- Mascot: Gnarls the Narwhal
- Website: newschool.edu/performing-arts

The College of Performing Arts, is part of The New School, New York City, NY. It was established in the fall of 2015 as part of major rebranding of the three performance arts colleges of The New School. The measure combined the Mannes School of Music, the School of Jazz and Contemporary Music, and School of Drama into a new institution called the College of Performing Arts. The college is mostly located within The New School's Arnhold Hall at 55 West 13th street, with the School of Drama located at 151 Bank street.

== Schools ==
The New School College of Performing Arts includes the following schools:

=== Mannes School of Music ===
Originally called The David Mannes Music School, it was founded in 1916 by David Mannes, concertmaster of the New York Symphony Orchestra, and his wife Clara Damrosch. In 1938, the school was renamed the Mannes Music School. In 1953 the school began offering degrees and changed its name to the Mannes College of Music. In 1960 it merged with the Chatham Square Music School. In 1989 Mannes joined The New School, whose eight schools included Parsons School of Design, Eugene Lang College, and The New School for Drama. In 2005, the New School administration changed the name to Mannes College: the New School for Music. In 2015, the university renamed it Mannes School of Music, and moved it to Arnhold Hall in the West Village.

=== School of Jazz ===
The School of Jazz at The New School offers Bachelor of Fine Arts (BFA) degrees in Jazz and Contemporary Music with concentrations in vocal and instrumental performance. The core curriculum includes courses in performance, analysis, composition, music history, and liberal arts. In addition, a student can select or audition for a wide range of elective courses and narrow your focus as you advance toward graduation.

=== School of Drama ===
The New School's theatrical MFA program was founded in 1994 in association with the Actors Studio. The program existed as the Actors Studio Drama School until 2005, when the contract with the Studio came to end. Following the split, New School President Bob Kerrey announced that the program would continue without the Studio as the New School for Drama, with Robert LuPone as Director and the School of Drama became part of the College of Performing Arts. The classes of 2006 and 2007 enrolled in the Actors Studio Drama School, graduated from the New School for Drama. The program is a three-year intensive, offering Masters of Fine Arts in Acting, Directing or Playwriting. The undergraduate program was established in 2013 and offers students a multidisciplinary, studio-driven program that combines courses in acting, directing and playwriting. The four-year program grants a BFA in the Dramatic Arts.

== Broadcasting ==
NSCR, or New School CoPa Radio, is an online radio station run by the College of Performing Arts (CoPa) and spans a wide range of genres, and features more than 400 artists, 500 albums, and 3,840 individual tracks and songs, all by students, faculty, alumni, and staff from CoPa divisions, including the School of Drama, School of Jazz and Contemporary Music, the Mannes School of Music, as well as alumni from the wider New School community. The station was established in 2021.
