= Saturday Review =

Saturday Review may refer to:

- Saturday Review (American magazine), a former weekly U.S.-based magazine, originally known as The Saturday Review of Literature, published 1920–1986
- Saturday Review (London newspaper), a London-based British newspaper published 1855–1938
- Saturday Review (radio programme), a BBC Radio 4 cultural review show
- Saturday Review (Sri Lankan newspaper), a former English-language Sri Lankan weekly newspaper
