= The New School =

Private university in New York City

- Former names: The New School for Social Research (1919–1997); New School University (1997–2005)
- Motto: To the Living Spirit
- Type: Private research university
- Established: 1919; 107 years ago
- Accreditation: MSCHE
- Endowment: $524.1 million (2025)
- President: Joel Towers
- Provost: Richard Kessler
- Academic staff: 431 FT/ 1592 PT
- Students: 10,186
- Undergraduates: 6,836
- Postgraduates: 3,138
- Doctoral students: 212
- Other students: 2,857 (continuing education)
- Location: New York City, New York, U.S. 40°44′08.08″N 73°59′49.08″W
- Campus: Urban
- Colors: White, Black, Parsons Red
- Sporting affiliations: Unaffiliated, competes against NCAA Division III schools
- Mascot: Gnarls the Narwhal
- Website: newschool.edu

The New School is a private research university in New York City, New York, United States. It was founded in 1919 as The New School for Social Research. Since then, the school has grown to house four divisions. These include the Parsons School of Design, the Eugene Lang College of Liberal Arts, the College of Performing Arts (which includes the Mannes School of Music) and The New School for Social Research.

In addition, the university maintains the Parsons Paris campus and has also launched or housed a range of institutions, such as the Healthy Materials Lab, the Institute for Race, Power, and Political Economy, World Policy Institute, the India China Institute, the Observatory on Latin America, and the Center for New York City Affairs. It is classified among "R2: Doctoral Universities – High research activity". Approximately 8,500 students are enrolled in undergraduate and postgraduate programs. Over 70 percent of students are in the creative areas of design, performing, and fine arts.

For much of the twentieth century, The New School was known for the graduate faculty in the social sciences and for adult education. The university became renowned for its teaching and its open intellectual environment, especially after it set up the University in Exile in 1933 as a graduate division to serve as an academic haven for scholars escaping from Nazi Germany and other anti-intellectual regimes in Europe. In contrast, the Adult Division flourished by offering over a thousand non-credit courses on all manner of offbeat and unusual topics.

== History ==
=== Name ===
From its founding in 1919 to 1997, the university was known as The New School for Social Research. Between 1997 and 2005 it was known as New School University. The university and each of its colleges were renamed in 2005.

The New School established the University in Exile and the École libre des hautes études in 1933. It was designed as a graduate division for largely Jewish scholars escaping from Hitler and other adversarial regimes in Europe. In 1934, the University in Exile was chartered by New York State and its name was changed to the Graduate Faculty of Political and Social Science. In 2005, it adopted what had initially been the name of the whole institution, the New School for Social Research, while the larger institution was renamed The New School.

=== Founding ===
The New School for Social Research was founded by a small group of university professors and intellectuals in 1919 as a school where adult students could "seek an unbiased understanding of the existing order, its genesis, growth, and present working". Founders included economist and literary scholar Alvin Johnson, historians Charles A. Beard and James Harvey Robinson, economist Thorstein Veblen, and philosopher John Dewey. Beard, Dewey, and Robinson were all faculty at Columbia University and all supporters of the Great War.

Events at Columbia University helped to precipitate the emergence of The New School. In October 1917, Columbia University suppressed faculty criticism of the United States's entry into World War I. Columbia fired two professors who were critical of both Woodrow Wilson and Nicholas Murray Butler, Columbia University's president. In response, Charles A. Beard, Professor of Political Science, resigned his professorship at Columbia in protest, though he supported the war. His colleague James Harvey Robinson, who also supported the war, resigned in 1919. Both Beard and Robinson became founders of The New School. John Dewey chose to remain on the faculty of Columbia.

The New School's plan was to offer the rigorousness of a college education without degree matriculation or degree prerequisites. The institution was theoretically open to anyone, as is the adult division today, which today is called the Schools of Public Engagement. The SPE remains part of The New School. The first classes at The New School took the form of lectures followed by discussions, for larger groups, or as smaller conferences, for "those equipped for specific research". In the first semester, 100 courses, mostly in economics and politics, were offered by an ad hoc faculty that included Thomas Sewall Adams, Charles A. Beard, Horace M. Kallen, Harold Laski, Wesley Clair Mitchell, Thorstein Veblen, James Harvey Robinson, Graham Wallas, Charles B. Davenport, Elsie Clews Parsons, and Roscoe Pound. Within a few years, the faculty expanded, particularly in the performing arts, to include Aaron Copland, Martha Graham, Doris Humphrey, Charles Seeger, Henry Cowell, and the Group Theater. Decades later, The New School began to offer degrees in line with the traditional university model. John Cage, who came to study at The New School in 1933 with the experimental composer Henry Cowell, taught at The New School from 1950 to 1960, including courses such as Experimental Composition and Mycology. Cage's teaching at the school inspired the founding of Fluxus, through his students, including Yoko Ono. Cage was forced out by the Graduate Faculty who did not feel that he was appropriate to their ideal of an academic professor.

==== Motto ====
The New School uses "To the Living Spirit" as its motto. In 1937, Thomas Mann remarked that a plaque bearing the inscription "be the Living Spirit" had been torn down by the Nazis from a building at the University of Heidelberg. He suggested that the University in Exile adopt that inscription as its motto, to indicate that the 'living spirit', mortally threatened in Europe, would have a home in this country. Alvin Johnson adopted that idea, and the motto continues to guide the division in its present-day endeavors. The university has begun to introduce a new vintage baseball cap that carries both the motto, To The Living Spirit, but also the original logo: The Tree of Life.

==== University in Exile ====
The Graduate Faculty of Political and Social Science was founded in 1933 as the University in Exile. It was largely for Jewish scholars purged from teaching positions under the antisemitic laws passed in 1933 Nazi Germany. By 1938, the matter became an issue of life or death for these scholars. The University in Exile, one of a number of similar programs being established nationally, was initially founded by the director of the New School, Alvin Johnson, through the financial contributions of Hiram Halle and the Rockefeller Foundation. Notable scholars associated with the University in Exile included psychologists Erich Fromm, Max Wertheimer, and Aron Gurwitsch, political theorists Hannah Arendt and Leo Strauss, philosopher Hans Jonas, musicologist Erich Moritz von Hornbostel and composer Hanns Eisler.

In 1934, the University in Exile was chartered by New York State and its name was changed to the Graduate Faculty of Political and Social Science. In 1941 it was granted its permanent charter. In 2005, the Graduate Faculty was again renamed, this time taking the original name of the university, The New School for Social Research. Today, the New School for Social Research is considered by many to be an intellectual home of Marxist, anarchist, and otherwise far left leaning faculty and graduate students.

==== New University in Exile Consortium ====
In 2018, the New University in Exile Consortium was formed. The consortium is a group of multiple colleges and universities around the world which host at least one exiled scholar per year, aiding them in academic pursuits as well as providing personal support with respect to their exile. Following its establishment, the consortium has helped host scholars from Afghanistan and Ukraine following the fall of the democratic Afghan government in 2021 and the Russian invasion of Ukraine in 2022.

==== École libre des hautes études ====
The New School played a similar role with the founding of the École Libre des Hautes Études after the Nazi invasion of France. Receiving a charter from de Gaulle's Free French government in exile, the École attracted largely Jewish refugee scholars who taught in French, including philosopher Jacques Maritain, anthropologist Claude Lévi-Strauss, and linguist Roman Jakobson. The École Libre gradually evolved into one of the leading institutions of research in Paris, the École des Hautes Études en Sciences Sociales, with which the New School maintains close ties.

==== Dramatic Workshop/School of Drama ====
Between 1940 and 1949, The New School offered the "Dramatic Workshop," a theater education program and predecessor of School of Drama founded by German emigrant theater director Erwin Piscator. The department chairs hired by Piscator were Stella Adler (acting), Lee Strasberg (directing), and Herbert Berghoff (playwriting). Among the students of the Dramatic Workshop were Beatrice Arthur, Harry Belafonte, Marlon Brando, Tony Curtis, Ben Gazzara, Michael V. Gazzo, Rod Steiger, Elaine Stritch, Shelley Winters and Tennessee Williams. Prior to the Dramatic Workshop, The Group Theater under the leadership of Harold Clurman and Lee Strasberg taught dramatic arts. Subsequent to the Dramatic Workshop, both Stella Adler and Lee Strasberg ran studios at The New School.

I attended The New School for Social Research for only a year, but what a year it was. The school and New York itself had become a sanctuary for hundreds of extraordinary European Jews who had fled Germany and other countries before and during World War II, and they were enriching the city's intellectual life with an intensity that has probably never been equaled anywhere during a comparable period of time.

— Marlon Brando, actor

=== Adult Division ===
In parallel with its graduate and special divisions, The New School was very well known for its Adult Division. Typically the Adult Division was the first one listed in the New School bulletin, before any others. Under the purview of Dean Allen Austill, its registrations nearly doubled during the decade of the 1970s, from around 10,000 to over 19,000, and there were far more students in that division of than in The New School's masters and doctoral programs. The Adult Division's revenues were such that it largely subsidized the Graduate Faculty.

Courses offered totaled 1,200 distinct ones in a semester in the late 1970s, mostly in the liberal arts and self-help categories. This figure that rose to over 2,000 by the mid-1980s. The school distributed some 125,000 copies of its over-200-pages-long course bulletins each year. a circulation that would soon be doubled within a decade. By the 1982–83 academic year, there were over 64,000 total registrations at the school.

Saturday Review wrote that "Free-form and sometimes screwball courses are part of a dizzying array of offerings available at New York City's New School for Social Research ... long a nerve center of the adult-education movement." Indeed, newspaper stories liked to point out some of the more off-beat courses titles, such as: "Flea Markets", "Soap-Opera Performing", and "Dollhouse Construction"; or "Restaurants of Chinatown", "Introduction to Crochet", and "Keeping Freshwater Tropical Fish"; or "How to Play the Piano Despite Years of Lessons", "Food for Thought (Were Roman banquets really orgies?)", and "Stalking the Edible City". The course listings were dynamic, with new ones being created and old ones being dropped each semester to match trends. In 1986, the New York Times wrote, "Anyone who wants to know what makes New Yorkers tick in the 1980's would be well advised to consult the New School catalogues."

For many years, the most popular courses at The New School were two given by film educator Richard Brown, in which he screened films in advance of their release and conducted in-class interviews with the films' creators and stars. Brown often had over 500 students in his classes by the end of the 1970s, and over 1,000 by the end of the 1980s. Another popular class was "Crossword Puzzles", given by the well-known puzzle editors Will Weng and Margaret Farrar. Subjects related to creativity were always popular as well; by the mid-1980s there were some twenty separate courses on fiction and non-fiction writing.

There was a trend across the nation for adults to return to college for additional education, either for personal fulfillment or to improve their career prospects. A particular motivation in New York was that it was a way for singles to meet each other, since at least one interest would be guaranteed in common. The New School's primary competitor in the adult market was the New York University School of Continuing Education, which also offered a large catalog of courses, a Lower Manhattan location, and increasing enrollments. One difference was that NYU's school tended to focus more on career development classes and programs. By the late 1970s, the pair had gained competition in the adult education arena, including from Hunter College, Marymount Manhattan College, and Columbia University, but The New School remained the market leader.

Critics of The New School referred to the Adult Division's offerings as "junk ed" or "pop ed". But some instructors at The New School defended the academic quality of the offerings; one who taught "Behavior Physiology: Neurosciences in Health and Disease" considered it worthy of an upperclass course at any university, while noting that the unpredictability of students' backgrounds and interests at The New School presented both challenges and rewards. Classes aimed at senior citizens were generally held in higher regard, especially those from the Institute for Retired Professionals that was part of the Adult Division.

=== Presidents ===
1. Alvin Saunders Johnson (1922–1945)
2. Bryn J. Hovde (1945–1950)
3. Hans Simons (1950–1960); Clara Mayer served as acting president (1951)
4. Abbott Kaplan (1960)
5. Henry David (1961–1963) followed by Robert Morrison MacIver (acting 1963–1964)
6. John R. Everett (1964–1982)
7. Jonathan Fanton (1982–1999)
8. Bob Kerrey (2001–2010)
9. David E. Van Zandt (2011–2020)
10. Dwight A. McBride (2020–2023)
11. Donna Shalala (2023–2024) interim
12. Joel Towers (2024–present)

=== 2025 restructuring ===
The New School has run at a $30 million deficit in 2023 and 2024. In 2025, The New School faced an expected $48 million deficit. The school's administration planned to close 30 academic programs or majors, pause doctoral admissions, and offer early retirement or buyouts to 17% of the full-time faculty.

The New School president Joel Towers, who leads the restructuring effort, said that his plan would retire the deficit and better prepare The New School for a rapidly changing world, including enrollments, changing needs of students, and introduce new areas of study. Towers also said that the restructuring would lead to innovation in doctoral studies, with an expansion into new doctoral programs, including practice-based, accelerated, industry facing, etc. Sanjay Reddy, at the time an economics professor at The New School, said that the deficit resulted from increased administrative costs, mismanaged real estate spending, poor marketing, and student dissatisfaction with support services. He warned that restructuring may "set in motion events which will further accentuate our problems". Reddy discounted things such as a 20% decline in enrollment since 2021, particularly in the liberal arts, as well as a doctoral program that is nearly $17 million in deficit on an annual basis. Reddy, along with 18 other professors, was laid off in June 2026.

== Organization ==
The New School is divided into autonomous colleges called "divisions". Each one is led by a dean and has its own scholarships, standards of admission, and acceptance rates.

=== Major colleges ===
| College | Founded | Schools or Divisions |
|---|---|---|
| The New School for Social Research | 1919 | |
| College of Performing Arts | 1916 | Mannes School of Music; School of Drama; School of Jazz and Contemporary Music; Mannes Prep |
| Eugene Lang College of Liberal Arts | 1978 | |
| Parsons School of Design | 1896 | School of Fashion; School of Art, Design, and Theory; School of Art, Media, and Technology; School of Constructed Environments; School of Design Strategies; Continuing & Professional Education; Flexible Learning |

==== Former divisions ====
| Division | Founded | Present school |
|---|---|---|
| The New School for General Studies | 1919–2011 | Merged with The New School for Public Engagement (now defunct) |
| Milano School of International Affairs, Management, and Urban Policy | 1964–2011 | Merged with The New School for Public Engagement (now defunct) |
| Otis Art Institute of Parsons School of Design | 1978–1991 | Exists independent in Los Angeles as the Otis College of Art and Design |
| The Actors Studio Drama School | 1994–2005 | |
| Mannes School of Music | 1916– | Now part of College of Performing Arts |
| School of Jazz and Contemporary Music | 1987– | Now part of College of Performing Arts |
| School of Drama | 2005– | Now part of College of Performing Arts |
| Schools of Public Engagement | 1919–2025 | Former programs moved to Parsons School of Design, The New School for Social Research and Eugene Lang College of Liberal Arts |

== Academics ==
Academic rankings

National
- Forbes: 261
- U.S. News & World Report: 133
- Washington Monthly: 298
- WSJ/College Pulse: 310

Global
- QS: 561–570
- THE: 801–1000

USNWR graduate school rankings
| Clinical Psychology | 138 |
| Fine Arts | 15 |
| Political Science | 81 |
| Psychology | 167 |
| Public Affairs | 83 |
| Urban Policy | 22 |
| Sociology | 54 |

Similar to many liberal arts colleges, The New School's Lang College has a "student-directed curriculum", which does not require its undergraduates to take general education courses. Instead, students are encouraged to explore before focusing on a major, selecting topics that are of interest to them. An exception to this is in the performing arts, where students must declare majors at enrollment. Although all "New Schoolers" are required to complete core training—usually of a literary, conservatory, or artistic nature—students are expected to be the primary designers of their own curriculum.

The university offers 81 degree/diploma programs and majors. Faculty members teach most of their classes seminar style and the student/faculty ratio is about 10:1.

=== Undergraduate admissions ===
In 2024, The New School accepted 62.5% of undergraduate applicants, with admission standards considered difficult, applicant competition considered low, and with those enrolled predicted to have an average 3.59 high school GPA based on a large sample of college GPA data since the university has not published its high school GPA data for incoming freshman. The university does not consider standardized test scores, the university having a test blind policy. Those enrolled students that had taken standardized tests had an average 1250 SAT score (34% having scores) or an average 28 ACT score (16% having scores).

=== Dual degree programs ===
The university offers a range of dual degree programs. These include a Bachelor of Arts and Bachelor of Fine Arts (colloquially called the "BA/FA pathway") program or a Bachelor of Arts and master's program. The former is a comprehensive five-year program that allows students to obtain their B.A. from Eugene Lang College and their B.F.A. from either Parsons or School of Jazz and Contemporary Music. The latter is also a five-year program that allows students at Eugene Lang to obtain their masters from the New School for Social Research. The university also offers a Master of Arts Management and Entrepreneurship program, which can be obtained along with either a Bachelor of Music (Mannes) or a Bachelor of Fine Arts (drama or jazz) in five-years.

=== Institutes and research centers ===
Various institutes and research centers at The New School focus on specific fields of study:

- International affairs and global perspectives
- Philosophy and intellectual culture
- Humanities Action Lab
- Politics, policy, and society
- Art, design, and theory
- Environment
- Urban and community development
- Center for Attachment Research
- Center for New York City Affairs
- Center for Public Scholarship

The New School's College of Performing Arts is home to the experimental music venue, The Stone, offering 240 concerts a year.

=== Enrollment demographics ===
Thirty-three percent of New School students come from outside of the United States, with 112 non-U.S. countries represented at the university. U.S. students come from all 50 states and the District of Columbia. Forty-three percent of them are people of color, and 5% of American students identify as more than one race. Of the entire student population, 63% receive financial aid, and 17% study abroad before graduating.

== Campus ==
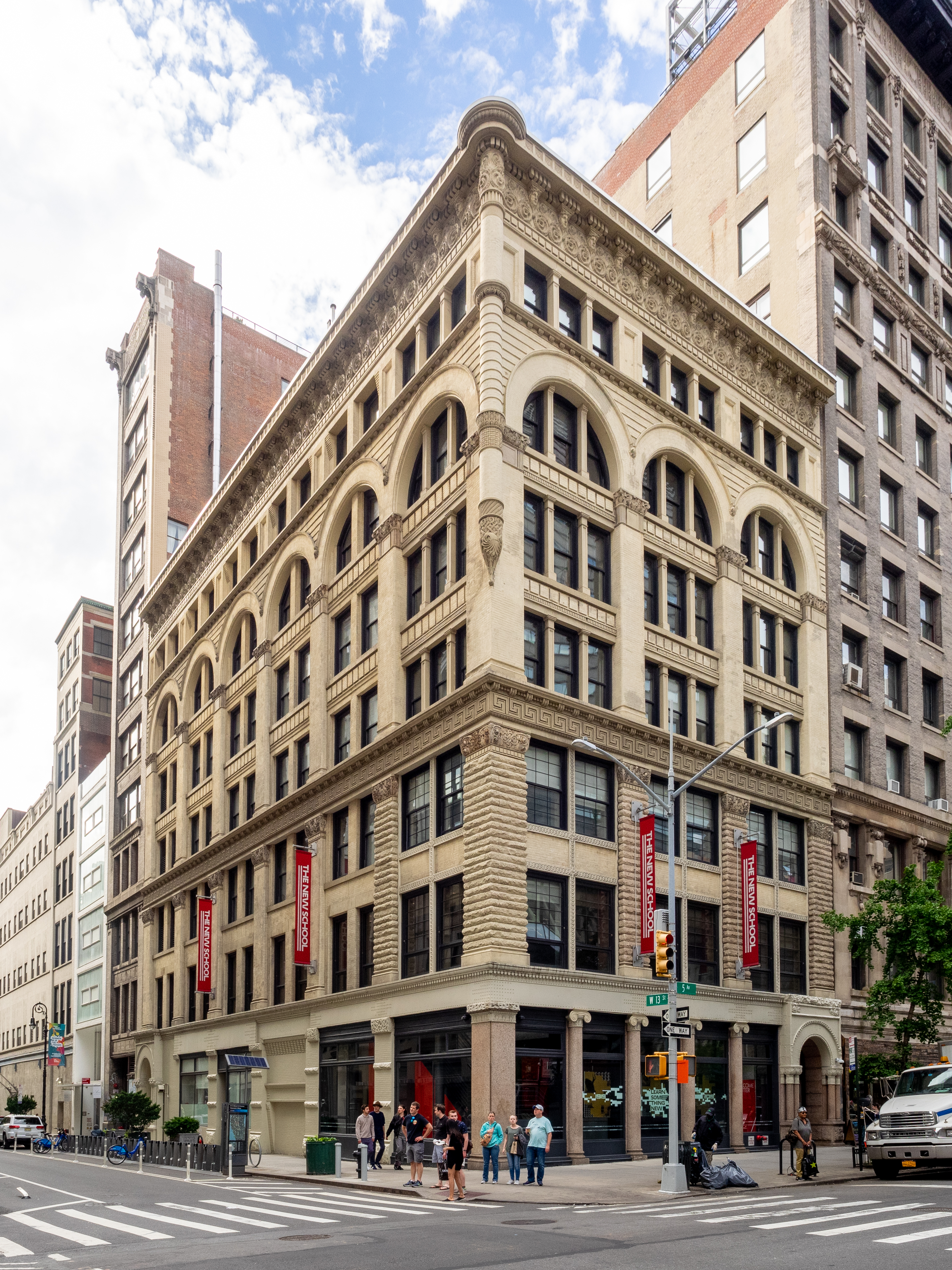
Fanton Hall, built in 1920

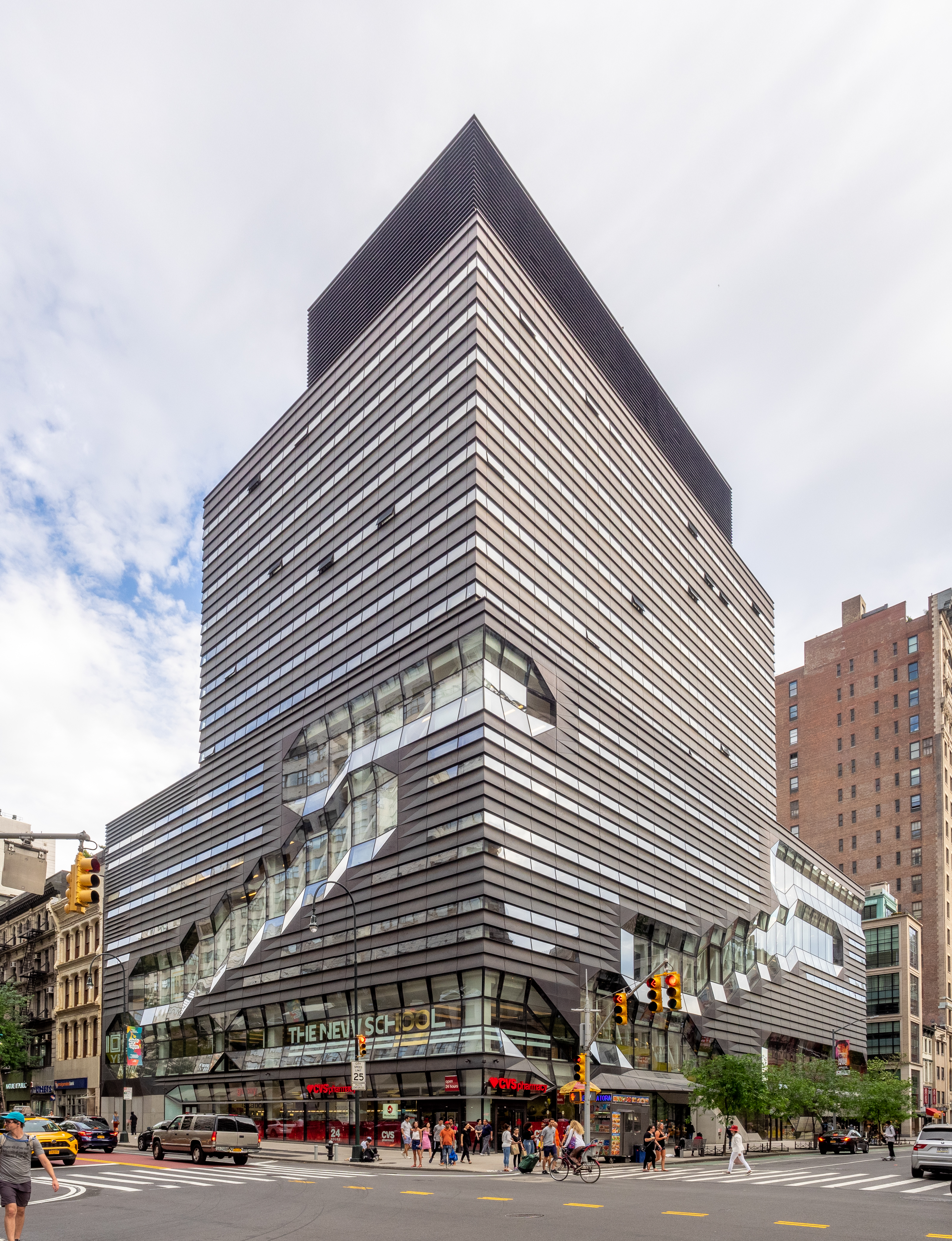
The New School University Center at 14th Street and Fifth Avenue, a LEED Gold building completed in 2013

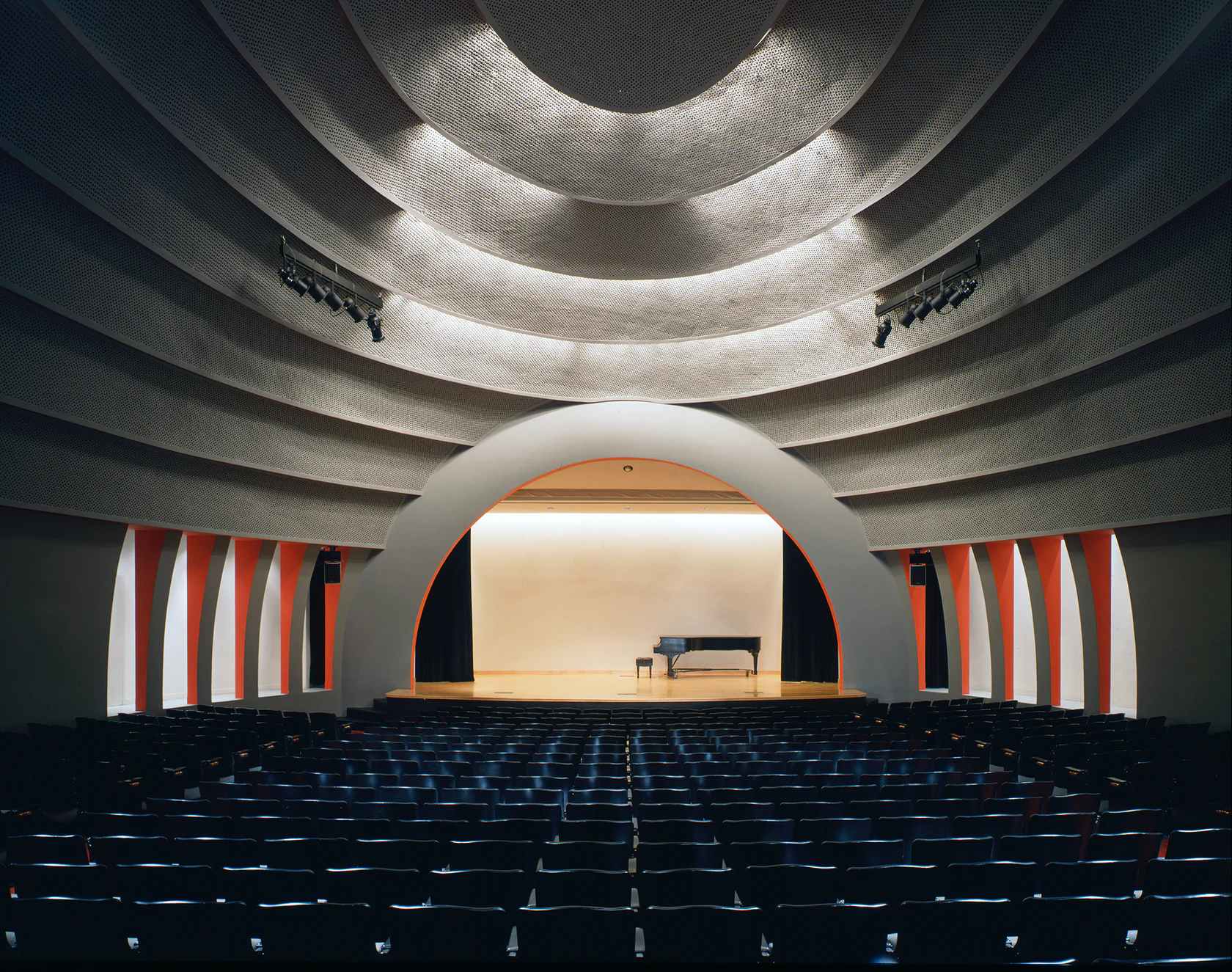
The proscenium-styled auditorium in J. M. Kaplan Hall, designed by Joseph Urban in 1930

The New School's campus is centered on the area immediately south of Union Square in New York's Greenwich Village. Exceptions are some dormitories and other administrative buildings that are located in Chelsea, Stuyvesant Park, and the College of Performing Arts in the West Village.

| Building name | Address | Division / Purpose |
|---|---|---|
| 20th Street Residence | 300 west 29th Street | Dormitory |
| 39 W 13th St | 39 W 13th St | Various |
| Administrative Offices | 80 Fifth Avenue; 71 Fifth Avenue | Administration |
| Albert and Vera List Academic Center | 6 East 16th Street | New School for Social Research |
| Alvin Johnson/J. M. Kaplan Hall | 66 West 12th Street | Schools of Public Engagement; Offices of President and Provost |
| Arnhold Hall | 55 West 13th Street | College of Performing Arts |
| Eugene Lang College | 65 West 11th Street | Eugene Lang College |
| Eugene Lang College Annex | 64 West 11th Street | Eugene Lang College |
| Fanton Hall | 72 Fifth Avenue | Welcome center, Registrar |
| Loeb Hall | 135 East 12th Street | Dormitory |
| Parsons East | 25 East 13th Street | Parsons School of Design |
| School of Drama | 151 Bank Street | College of Performing Arts |
| Sheila C. Johnson Design Center | 66–68 Fifth Avenue; 2 West 13th Street | Parsons School of Design |
| Stuyvesant Park | 318 East 15th Street | Dormitory |
| University Center | 63 Fifth Avenue | All divisions |

=== University Center ===
The New School opened the 16-story University Center ("UC") at 65 5th Avenue in January 2014.

While the 65 Fifth Avenue plans were initially controversial among students and Village residents (spurring in 2009 a major student occupation that was held at The New School's previous building on that site), plans for the University Center were adjusted in response to community concerns. In a review of the University Center's final design, The New York Times architecture critic Nicolai Ouroussoff called the building "a celebration of the cosmopolitan city".

The UC serves as a central hub for all university students, though the majority of classrooms and studios are in use by Parsons. The tower, which was designed by Skidmore, Owings and Merrill's Roger Duffy, is the largest capital project the university has undertaken. The building added classrooms, new residences, computer labs, event facilities, and a cafeteria to the downtown New York City campus in addition to a library, and lecture hall.

=== Historical significance ===
Several of the university buildings are New York City designated landmarks. Among these is the egg-shaped Tishman Auditorium, an interior landmark. It was designed by architect Joseph Urban, along with the entirety of The New School's 66 West 12th Street building, the last major project Urban designed. Writer's forums, author visits, political debates, award ceremonies, academic lectures, performances, and public hearings are held for both the academic community and general public throughout the year in Tishman.

Newer buildings have received awards. Among these is The Sheila Johnson Design Center, which attracted media attention for its design. In 2009, it won the Society for College and University Planning's Excellence in Architecture Renovation/Adaptive Reuse Award. In addition to being a Parsons core academic building, the center also serves as a public art gallery. The New School Welcome Center, located on 13th Street and Fifth Avenue, won the American Institute of Architects, New York Chapter's Interiors Merit Award in 2010.

== Centennial ==
In October 2019, the university celebrated its centennial with The Festival of New.

== Libraries ==
As of 2022, The New School maintains three library locations and its Archives & Special Collections in New York City and is a member of the Research Library Association of South Manhattan. In 2009, its libraries counted a total of 1,906,046 holdings.

- Fogelman Social Sciences and Humanities Library (migrated to the List Center)
- Kellen Archives – design and Parsons' history (migrated to Archives & Special Collections)
- Visual Resource Center (no longer active)
- Adam and Sophie Gimbel Design Library (migrated to University Center Library in 2013)
- Alexis Gregory Library for the Performing Arts (migrated to broader university library system in 2026)
- Archives & Special Collections
- University Center Library – art, design, and technology
- List Center Library – humanities and social sciences

=== Art collection ===
In 1931 the New School commissioned two mural cycles: José Clemente Orozco's "A Call for Revolution" and "Universal Brotherhood" and Thomas Hart Benton's epic America Today. The New School Art Collection was established in 1960 with a grant from the Albert A. List Foundation. The collection, now grown to approximately 1,800 postwar and contemporary works of art, includes examples in almost all media. Parts of it are exhibited throughout the campus. Notable artists such as Andy Warhol, Kara Walker, Richard Serra, and Sol LeWitt all have pieces displayed in New School's academic buildings.

== Publications ==
=== Academic journals ===
The New School publishes the following journals:

- Constellations
- Social Research
- The Graduate Faculty Philosophy Journal
- International Journal of Politics, Culture, and Society
- New School Economic Review
- New School Psychology Bulletin
- The Journal of Design Strategies
- The Parsons Journal for Information Mapping (PJIM), a quarterly publication by the Parsons Institute for Information Mapping

=== Other university publications ===
- re:D, the magazine for Parsons alumni and the wider Parsons community, published by the New School Alumni Association.
- The New School Free Press, abbreviated as NSFP, is a student-run newspaper covering events around The New School. Periodic printed editions are distributed in newsstands across campus, while their website publishes continuously updated content.
- LIT, a nationally distributed literary journal – contains works selected by the MFA Creative Writing Program
- 12th Street, a nationally distributed literary journal from The New School's Riggio Honor Program that contains work from undergraduate writers at the university
- Eleven and a Half, the literary journal of Eugene Lang College
- NEW_S, an e-newsroom showcasing The New School in major media, major student and alumni achievements, university programs, and other news
- Canon Magazine, a quarterly publication of student writings published by The New School for Social Research
- Public Seminar is a journal dedicated to the intellectual and cultural understanding of democracy through the lens of design, the social sciences, performing arts, and humanities. Public Seminar is produced by New School faculty, students, and staff, and supported by colleagues and collaborators around the world.
- Scapes, the annual journal of the School of Constructed Environments
- BIAS: Journal of Dress Practice, a journal published by the MA Fashion Studies Dress Practice Collective started in the spring of 2013 that aims to join elements of "visual culture, fashion theory, design studies and personal practice through a variety of media".

=== Broadcasting ===
- WNSR, or New School Radio, is a student-run online-only news and opinion outlet for all divisions of The New School. Programming is produced by graduate and undergraduate students and delivered in the form of episodic streaming and podcasts. It was established in 2010.
- NSCR, or New School CoPa Radio, is an online radio station run by the College of Performing Arts (CoPa) and spans a wide range of genres, and features more than 400 artists, 500 albums, and 3,840 individual tracks and songs, all by students, faculty, alumni, and staff from CoPa divisions, including the School of Drama, School of Jazz and Contemporary Music, the Mannes School of Music, as well as alumni from the wider New School community. The station was established in 2021.
- New Histories is a faculty-run podcast show at The New School that focuses on the university's history.
- Unbound is a student-run podcast show at The New School that focuses on philosophy.

== Student life ==
=== Student organizations ===
The New School houses over 50 recognized student organizations, most of which are geared towards artistic endeavors or civic engagement. Notable among these are The Theatre Collective, which stages numerous dramatic productions throughout the year, Narwhals on Broadway, Students for a Democratic Society (SDS), the New School Debate Team (intercollegiate competition in Policy/Cross Examination style debate), ReNew School (sustainability and environmental advocacy group), Moxie (feminist alliance), the New Urban Grilling Society (NUGS), and The Radical Student Union (RSU).

=== Athletics and recreation ===
The department began in December 2008 under its original name Recreation and Intramural sports. The McBurney YMCA is where intramurals continue to be held on Wednesday nights.

The Narwhals feature several intercollegiate teams: basketball (2009), cross country (2010), cycling (2013), soccer (2013), tennis (2014), ultimate Frisbee (2014). The New School Narwhals are an independent school, unaffiliated with the NCAA, but regularly compete against NCAA Division III schools.

- Basketball – competes regularly against Cooper Union, Culinary Institute of America, Pratt Institute, and Vaughn College
- Cross Country – competes in CUNYAC and HVIAC conference invitationals as an unaffiliated school
- Cycling – a member of the Eastern Collegiate Cycling Conference
- Soccer – competes against Cooper Union, Culinary Institute of America, St. Joseph's College, and Vaughn College

== Activist culture and social change ==
The New School has been associated with left-leaning politics, campus activism, civic engagement, and social change. It is a "Periclean University" (a member of Project Pericles), meaning that it teaches "education for social responsibility and participatory citizenship as an essential part of their educational programs, in the classroom, on the campus, and in the community". The New School is one of nine American universities to be inducted into Ashoka's "Changemaker" consortium for social entrepreneurship.

In 2010, NYC Service awarded New School special recognition in The College Challenge, a volunteer initiative, for the "widest array of [civic] service events both on and off campus". Miriam Weinstein also cites the Eugene Lang division in her book, Making a Difference Colleges: Distinctive Colleges to Make a Better World.

In 2024 during the Gaza war, students participated in pro-Palestinian occupations which called for the divestment from defense companies, an academic boycott of Israeli institutions, the expulsion of jazz students from Israel, amnesty for all students and staff sanctioned by the university for violations of codes of conduct, and the barring of police on campus for any reason whatsoever. During the spring, when faculty, staff, and students barred students from entering their dormitory, those blocking entrance were arrested, but Donna E. Shalala, the interim president of New School, stated that criminal charges would not be pursued against the student protesters who were arrested.

=== Kerrey presidency and opposition ===
Former U.S. Senator Bob Kerrey became president of The New School in 2000. Kerrey drew praise and criticism for his streamlining of the university, as well as censure for his support of the 2003 invasion of Iraq, generally opposed by the university's faculty.

In 2004, Kerrey appointed Arjun Appadurai as provost. Appadurai resigned as provost in early 2006, but retained a tenured faculty position. He was succeeded by Joseph W. Westphal. On December 8, 2008, Kerrey announced that Westphal was stepping down to accept a position in President Barack Obama's Department of Defense transition team. Kerrey then appointed himself to the provost position while remaining president. This decision was strongly criticised by faculty and other members of the university community as a power-grab involving potential conflicts of interest. This was seen as a threat to scholarly integrity since the role of provost in overseeing the academic functions of a university has traditionally been insulated from fundraising and other responsibilities of a college president. After a series of rifts including protests involving student occupations of university buildings, Kerrey later appointed Tim Marshall, Dean of Parsons School of Design, as Interim Provost through June 2011. Marshall has since been reappointed in this role.

On December 10, 2008, 74 of the New School's senior full-time professors gave a vote of no confidence for the New School's former president, Bob Kerrey. By December 15, 98% of the university's full-time faculty had voted no confidence. On December 17, over 100 students barricaded themselves in at a dining hall on the campus while hundreds more waited on the streets outside. They considered the current school administration opaque and harmful. Their chief demand, among others, was that Bob Kerrey resign. The students soon enlarged their occupied area, blocking security and police from entering the building. At 3 AM the next morning, the students left the building after Kerrey agreed to some of their demands. The agreed-to demands included increased study space and amnesty for any actions performed during the protest. He did not concede to resignation. In total, the occupation lasted 30 hours.

The following year, on April 10, 2009, students, mostly from New School but also from other New York colleges, reoccupied the building at 65 Fifth Avenue, this time holding the entire building for about six hours. The students demanded the resignation of Bob Kerrey. The New York Police Department arrested the occupiers, and the New School students involved were suspended. The next month, Kerrey announced he would fulfill his presidency at the university through the end of his term and expressed his intent to leave office in June 2011. He resigned a semester early, on January 1, 2011. In August, the board of trustees appointed David E. Van Zandt the university's president.

=== Environmental sustainability ===
In 2010, The Princeton Review gave the university a sustainability rating of 94 out of 99. In 2010, the organization also named The New School one of America's "286 Green Colleges". The New School has a student-led environment and sustainability group, called Renew School, as well as full-time employees devoted to the school's sustainability. The university signed the Presidents' Climate Commitment and PlaNYC. In 2018, The New School had the lowest reported carbon footprint of any college and university submitting inventories under the Green Report Card program, totaling about 1.0 metric tons CO2 per student. Subsequently, with the completion of the LEED certified but large University Center, The New School's carbon footprint increased to about 1.5 metric tons.

=== Labor movement ===
Academic student workers are represented by SENS-UAW. Clerical employees and librarians are represented by Teamsters Local 1205. Professional employees are represented by Teamsters Local 1205 Professional. Student health employees are represented by SHENS-UAW Local 7902. Maintenance workers and security are represented by SEIU 32BJ. Engineers are represented by IUOE Local 94. Part-time faculty are represented by ACT-UAW Local 7902. Part-time jazz faculty are represented by AFM Local 802.

In 2003, adjunct faculty in several divisions of the New School began to form a labor union chapter under the auspices of the United Auto Workers. Though the university at first tried to contest the unionization, after several rulings against it by regional and national panels of the National Labor Relations Board, the university recognized the local chapter, ACT-UAW, as the bargaining agent for the faculty. As a result of a near strike in November 2005 on the part of the adjunct faculty, the ACT-UAW union negotiated its first contract which included the acknowledgment of previously unrecognized part-time faculty at Mannes College The New School for Music, the only division of The New School where a majority of the faculty did not vote to support unionization. In October 2018, graduate students received a tentative union contract from the administration after months of negotiations.

In November 2022, the union that represents the university's part-time faculty, ACT-UAW Local 7902, voted to strike following six months of unsuccessful contract negotiations. The strike began November 16. On December 5, the university announced it would withhold pay and healthcare premiums for all strikers, including full-time faculty and staff who had stopped work. To that end, the university sent out forms requiring student-workers to attest to having "delivered [their] work obligations." However, the New School paid all striking workers, resulting in anger by students who felt they did not receive what they paid for. In response, the union filed an unfair labor practice charge with the National Labor Relations Board. The next day, some staff, students, and faculty of The New School for Social Research expressed a vote of no confidence in the McBride administration. Notably, neither Parsons nor Mannes voted no confidence, amounting to the vast majority of The New School faculty, staff, and students, revealing a significant cultural divide between the creative arts community and those in the social sciences. Before the strike ended, a handful of student organizers initiated an occupation of the University Center as a display of protest. The strike ended on December 10, when, with the help of a federal mediator, the union and the university tentatively agreed to a contract that increased part-time faculty pay, compensated them for their work outside the classroom, and made more union members eligible for health insurance. The union approved the contract on December 31. It is commonly understood that the contract has contributed heavily to ongoing deficits at The New School.

=== Hillel chapter suspension ===
In May 2026, the University Student Senate (USS) voted to pause The New School's chapter of Hillel International, following the new Registered Student Organization (RSO) compliance committee's findings that the chapter had "directly supported [Israel Defense Force] military bases at Tze’elim army base, where they materially supported over 700 soldiers from the Oketz, Kfir, Golani and Handasa units in the IDF." The New School's administration subsequently rejected the funding pause, writing that the pause was "misguided".

On June 4, 2026, Prism Reports published a report alleging The New School administration were now investigating the student senators who voted to cut ties with Hillel and authored the committee's report. Ryder Glickman, chair of The New School Student Senate and a producer of the report, said, "We were hoping that the university would act on the evidence provided by the Student Senate report about Hillel’s complicity in genocide. They are investigating us instead."

== See also ==
- Education in New York City
- Free University of New York – Social enterprise
- National Book Award – American literary awards
- New York Foundation – 1909 charitable foundation, NY, NY, US
- New York Intellectuals – Mid-20th-century American writers and critics
- Project Pericles – Group of liberal arts colleges and universities
