= Project Pericles =

Group of liberal arts colleges and universities

Project Pericles Inc. is a non-profit organization composed of liberal arts colleges and universities geared towards the ideas that social responsibility and participatory citizenship are essential parts of an undergraduate curriculum, in the classroom, on campus, and in the community.

== Background ==
Conceived by Eugene M. Lang, a retired businessman known for his educational philanthropy, Project Pericles seeks to counter the growing political cynicism and civic disengagement of young people. Convinced that higher education must promote social and civic engagement, in 1999 Lang organized a planning committee and consulted with college presidents, trustees, faculty, students, and others. By the end of 2000, the objectives, policies, and startup plans of Project Pericles were set. Ten colleges and universities became “founding Pericleans.”

The Boards of the Pericleans formally committed their institutions to the policies and objectives of Project Pericles. Their presidents formed a Presidents’ Council to cooperate in policy-making and program development and implementation. The planning committee became the board of directors. Distinguished educational, business, political, and community leaders became the national board of advisors.

In April 2003, the first ten Pericleans met in New York for the first national conference of Project Pericles. Delegates included presidents, provosts, deans, faculty, students, and alumni. In August 2003, Project Pericles established an independent office and hired Karen E. Holt as executive director. In November 2005, Jan R. Liss became its second executive director.

In 2004 and 2005, a select group of new Pericleans added to the diversity of Project Pericles. The spirit of Pericleans and cumulative experience continue to strengthen Project Pericles in its mission as a transforming force for higher education.

== Periclean programs ==
- Debating for Democracy (D4D)™
- Periclean Faculty Leadership (PFL) Program™
- Student Choices - Student Voices (SCSV)
- Creating Curricular Coherence
- Creating Cohesive Pathways to Civic Engagement
- Study of Civic Engagement and Wellness

== Members ==
- Allegheny College
- Bates College
- Berea College
- Bethune-Cookman University
- Carleton College
- Chatham University
- Dillard University
- Drew University
- Elon University
- The Evergreen State College
- Goucher College
- Hampshire College
- Hendrix College
- Macalester College
- Morehouse College
- New England College
- The New School
- Occidental College
- Pace University
- Pitzer College
- Reed College
- Rensselaer Polytechnic Institute
- Rhodes College
- Skidmore College
- Swarthmore College
- Ursinus College
- Wagner College
- Whitman College
- Widener University
- The College of Wooster
