= Parsons School of Design =

Private art and design college in New York City

- Former names: Chase School (1896–1898); New York School of Art (1898–1909); New York School of Fine and Applied Art (1909–1941); Parsons The New School for Design (2005–2015)
- Type: Private Art and Design School
- Established: 1896; 130 years ago
- Parent institution: The New School
- Accreditation: MSCHE
- Affiliations: Cooper Hewitt, Smithsonian Design Museum
- Academic affiliations: AICAD; NASAD; NYSED; NAAB
- Dean: Anne Gaines
- Faculty: 1,400
- Students: 5,755
- Undergraduates: 4,604
- Postgraduates: 1,151
- Location: New York City, United States; 40°44′07″N 73°59′39″W
- Campus: Urban
- Colors: White, Black, Parsons Red
- Mascot: Gnarls the Narwhal
- Website: newschool.edu/parsons

The Parsons School of Design is a private art and design college under The New School located in the Greenwich Village neighborhood of New York City. Founded in 1896 after a group of progressive artists broke away from established Manhattan art academies in protest of limited creative autonomy, Parsons is one of the oldest schools of art and design in New York.

Parsons was the first school to offer programs in fashion design, interior design, advertising, graphic design, transdisciplinary design, and lighting design. Parsons became the first American school to found a satellite school abroad when it established the Paris Ateliers in 1921. It remains the first and only private art and design school to affiliate with a private national research university, in 1970 when it became one of the divisions of The New School. Organized in five departments, the school offers undergraduate and graduate programs in a range of disciplines in art and design with students also able to combine additional classes and majors in other colleges of The New School.

== History ==
=== 19th century ===
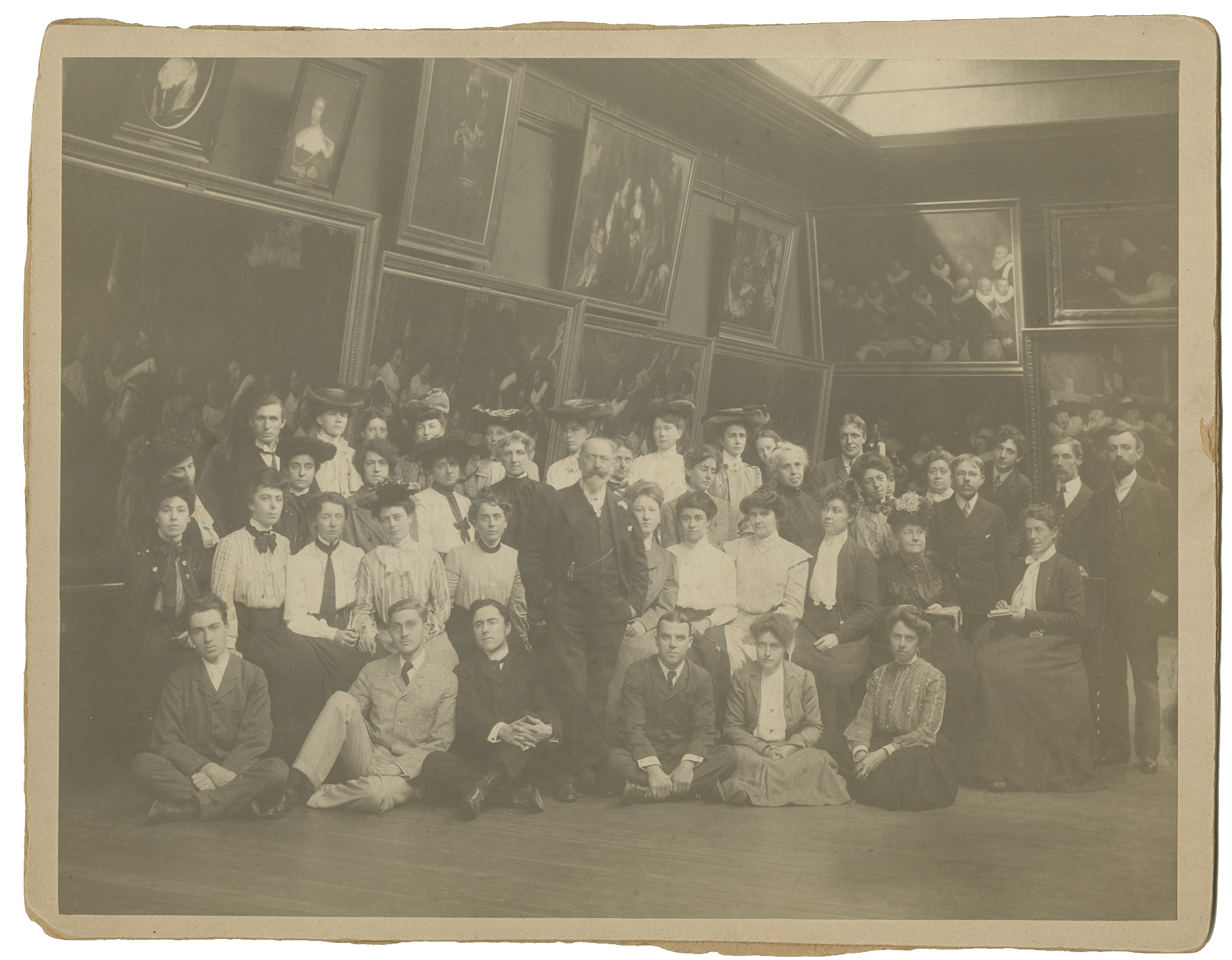
Founder William Merritt Chase with students in 1903

First established in Manhattan in 1896 as the Chase School by its founder, American impressionist painter William Merritt Chase (1849–1916), who led a small group of artists away from the Art Students League of New York in search of a less traditional, more progressive institution. The Chase School educated several luminaries of early American modernism, such as Marsden Hartley and Edward Hopper. But whereas Chase was a talented artist and teacher, he lacked the business acumen to run a growing school; in 1898, under new management, it became the New York School of Art.

=== 20th century ===
In 1904, Frank Alvah Parsons was hired by Chase as a professor at the school. Around the same time, Parsons studied under the tutelage of vanguard artist and educator, Arthur Wesley Dow at Columbia University. He graduated in 1905 with a degree in fine arts and became the sole director of the New York School of Art in 1911. Seeing a new wave of the Industrial Revolution, Parsons anticipated the importance of art and design to industries. His vision led to a series of firsts at the school: he established the first programs ever in fashion design (originally costume design) in 1904, interior design (originally interior decoration) in 1906, and graphic design (originally advertising and commercial illustration) in 1910. In 1909, the school was renamed the New York School of Fine and Applied Art to reflect the new offerings that would combine art and design. Parsons became the sole director of the school in 1911. Parsons advocated for a more democratized movement to design education stating "Art is not for the few, for the talented, for the genius, for the rich, nor the church," Parsons said in 1920. "Industry is the nation's life, art is the quality of beauty in expression, and industrial art is the cornerstone of our national art". Frank Alvah Parsons and alumnus William M. Odom established the school's Paris ateliers in 1921, with assistance from other long-time Parson's teachers, including artists Zerelda Rains and Grace Fuller.

Upon Frank Alvah Parsons' death in 1930, William M. Odom succeeded Parsons as director. In honor of Parsons, whose teaching philosophy and theories on the intersections between art and design steered the school's development and reputation, the school became the Parsons School of Design in 1941. In 1942, after directing the Paris location, Parsons alumnus Van Day Truex became director of Parsons until 1952, when soon after he became Tiffany & Company's design director and developed the firm's signature interiors and graphics.

As the curriculum developed, many successful designers maintained close ties with the school, and by the mid-1960s, Parsons had become "the training ground for Seventh Avenue." In 1970, through the efforts of future Parsons Dean David C. Levy, Parsons joined the New School for Social Research, allowing for the expansion of degree programs, research, and partnerships. In 1970, Parsons awards the United States first university degrees in fashion design, interior design, and lighting design.

=== 21st century ===
In 2005, when the parent institution was renamed The New School, the college was rebranded as Parsons The New School for Design.

In 2015, Pentagram Principal Paula Scher led the official redesign of The New School's identity together with Parsons'. The aesthetics of the new identity were drawn from the signage and architecture of The New School's historic Joseph Urban building as well as elements from the recently constructed University Center building in 2013. The new branding utilizes a font called 'Neue', a customized version of the font 'Irma', which is the University Center's wayfinding font. Neue, which means "new" in German, was designed using a computer algorithm. The proprietary font has been named in honor of The New School, with a nod to The New School's progressive teaching philosophy. Pentagram worked with Parsons students to create a special environmental installation at the Sheila C. Johnson Design Center as well as on the campus water towers to introduce the new identity. It was at this time the school reclaimed the name Parsons School of Design.

In 2019, IBM approached The New School to develop university courses and a first-of-its-kind Quantum Design Jam with IBM Quantum Experts, New School students, researchers, and faculty. This led to the creation of Parsons' first quantum computing course co-taught by Lin Zhou and Sven Travis. Parsons' Quantum Computing for Design and Social Research project entry subsequently won a FutureEdge 50 Award.

In the same year, the MS in Data Visualization program at Parsons partnered with the Metropolitan Museum of Art. Students were tasked with interpreting data from The Met Open Access API to design creative presentations on their choice of topics. Parsons' Quantum Computing for Design and Social Research project entry subsequently won a FutureEdge 50 Award. The effort was recognized by The Met's Jennie Choi, General Manager of Collections Information, for "revealing connections [the team] didn't know existed".

In 2020, the United Nations collaborated with students from the Global Executive Master of Science in Strategic Design and Management (GEMS), to promote the UN's Global Communications group's "Decade of Action" campaign. The collaboration focused on human-centered experiences and solutions for climate change and gender equality that would resonate across cultures, generations, and socioeconomic levels.

In 2022, Parsons' communications design department celebrated its centennial with the book "1, 10, 100 Years: Form, Typography, and Interaction at Parsons". The department offered the first undergraduate program of its kind when Parsons began teaching courses in the subject 100 years ago.

In 2023, Parsons launched the RMIT–Parsons Ph.D. collaboration as part of the Practice Research Symposium (PRS) program. Candidates will work with faculty from both RMIT and Parsons, but their primary geographical home will be the Parsons NYC campus. The Ph.D. degree will be conferred by RMIT in Australia.

In 2025, after university-wide restructuring, resulting in the closure of The Schools of Public Engagement as an independent academic division of The New School, a number of its former programs moved to Parsons.

== Campus ==
=== University Center ===
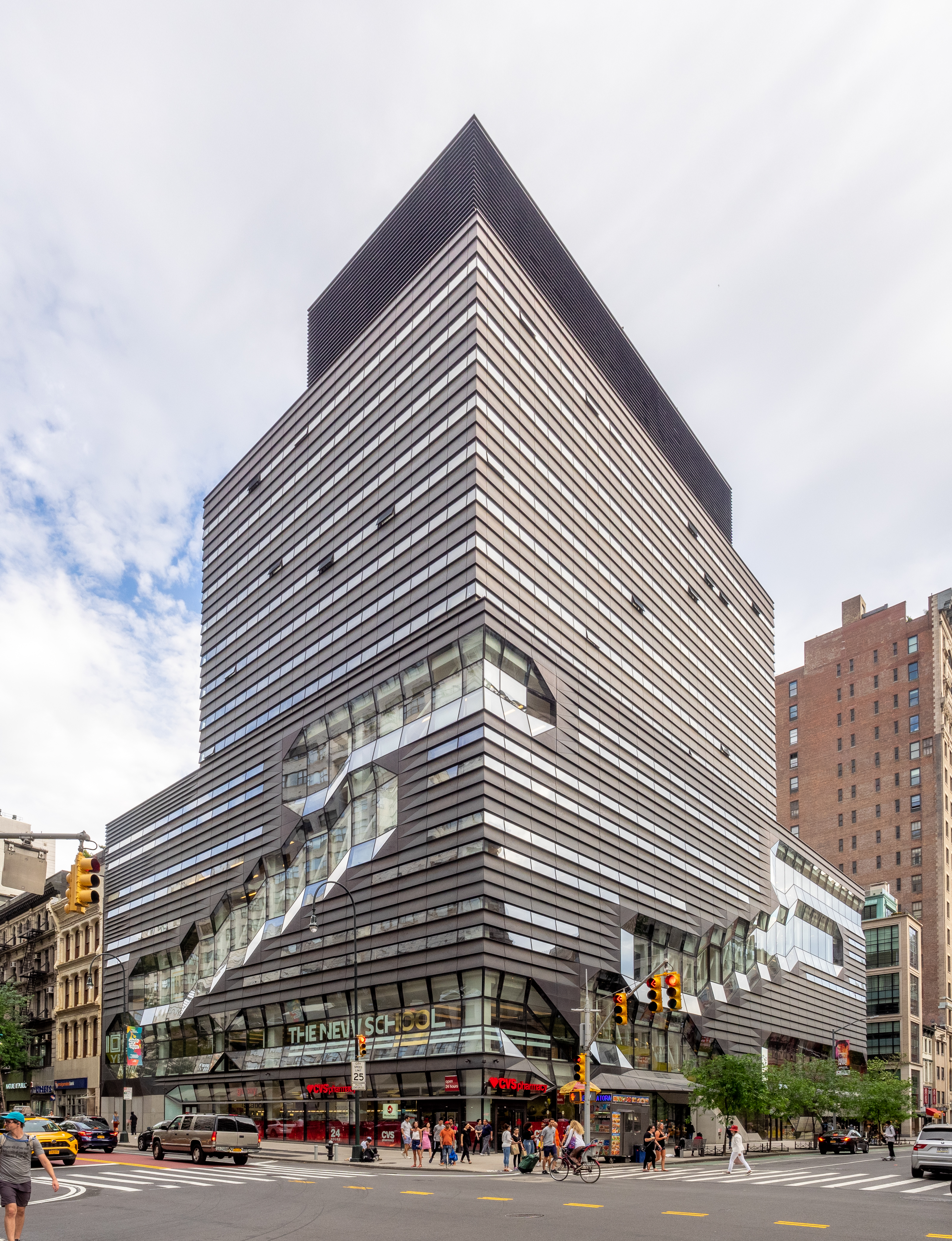
The University Center, completed in 2013

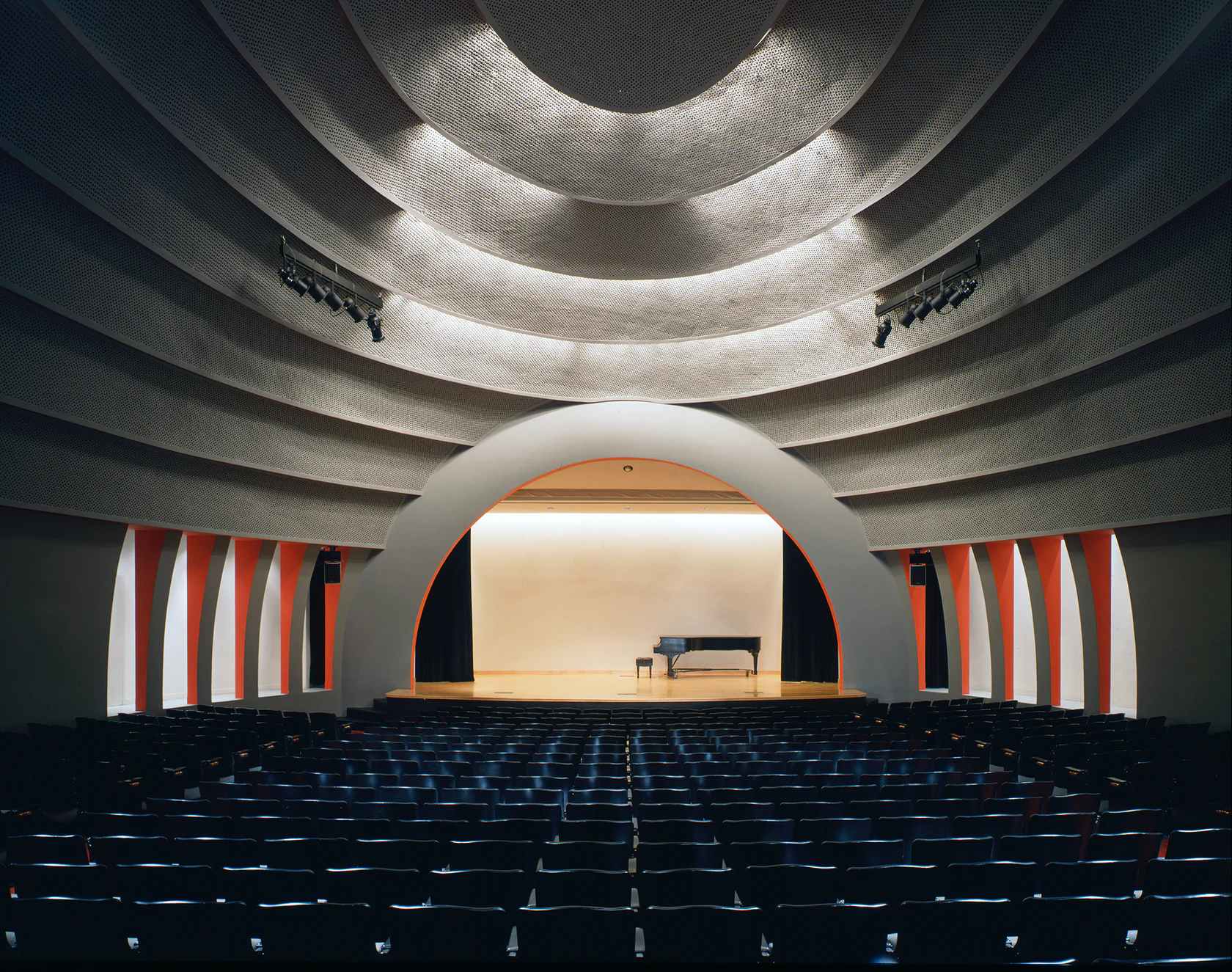
The proscenium-styled auditorium in Kaplan Hall, designed by Joseph Urban in 1930

In 1967, New School patrons Vera and Albert List helped purchase and renovate a former department store building at 63-65 Fifth Avenue. The building was named The Albert List Academic Center and served as a cafeteria, graduate facility, and research center of the university for many decades. By the early 2000s, then university president Bob Kerrey, wanting to centralize several of The New School's disconnected colleges around Manhattan, called for the building to be replaced by a larger "university center". While the 63-65 Fifth Avenue demolition plans were initially controversial among students and Village residents (spurring several major student occupations of the building in 2009), plans for the building were adjusted in response to student and community concerns. In 2010 the building was demolished and a new design for the proposed University Center unveiled. The New School opened the 16-story University Center at 65 5th Avenue in January 2013. The tower, designed by Skidmore, Owings and Merrill architect Roger Duffy, is the largest capital project the university has ever undertaken. The building won several design awards including the Urban Land Institute's 2017–2018 Global Award for Excellence and the 2015 North American Copper in Architecture Award. In a review of the University Center's final design, The New York Times architecture critic Nicolai Ouroussoff called the building "a celebration of the cosmopolitan city". The building has a LEED Gold certification and incorporates green building methods like LED based occupancy sensors, sustainably sourced materials, exterior brass alloy gladding that shades the building, a restricted 35% total glazing envelope, stormwater retention gardens on its roof that funnel to graywater and blackwater recycling tanks, built-in composting vessels in the cafeteria, and a 265-kilowatt cogeneration plant to offset its energy use from the city. At the time of its completion, it was considered one of the most energy-efficient academic buildings in the United States.

The complex houses the University Center Library, a student dormitory, lecture halls, a 800-seat auditorium, three dining areas, event spaces, computer labs, sewing construction classrooms and workshops, a shoemaking studio, 17 drawing studios, 12 classrooms, and other specialty sewing labs. The University Center also houses part of The New School Art Collection. The collection, now grown to approximately 2,000 postwar and contemporary works of art, continues the school's tradition of incorporating site-specific works into its public spaces. The school commissioned five socially-themed frescoes by José Clemente Orozco in mid-January 1931, and to date is the only permanent, public examples of this fresco form from Mexico in New York City. The former Albert List Academic Center's boardroom featured the commissioned work by Thomas Hart Benton, America Today, which is now on-view at the Metropolitan Museum of Art.

=== The Sheila C. Johnson Design Center ===
The largest of the four buildings, 70 Fifth Avenue, is a twelve-story L-shaped building at the corner of Fifth Avenue and West 13th street and was originally built in 1914 as an office and loft building. It housed the national office of the National Association for the Advancement of Colored People (NAACP) from February 1914 to June 1923. It was also the location for many unions and justice organizations before it was acquired by The New School in 1972, including the American Union Against Militarism (AUAM) (which founded the National Civil Liberties Bureau and later became the ACLU), League for Industrial Democracy, League of Nations Union, New York City Teachers Union and Woman's Peace Party.

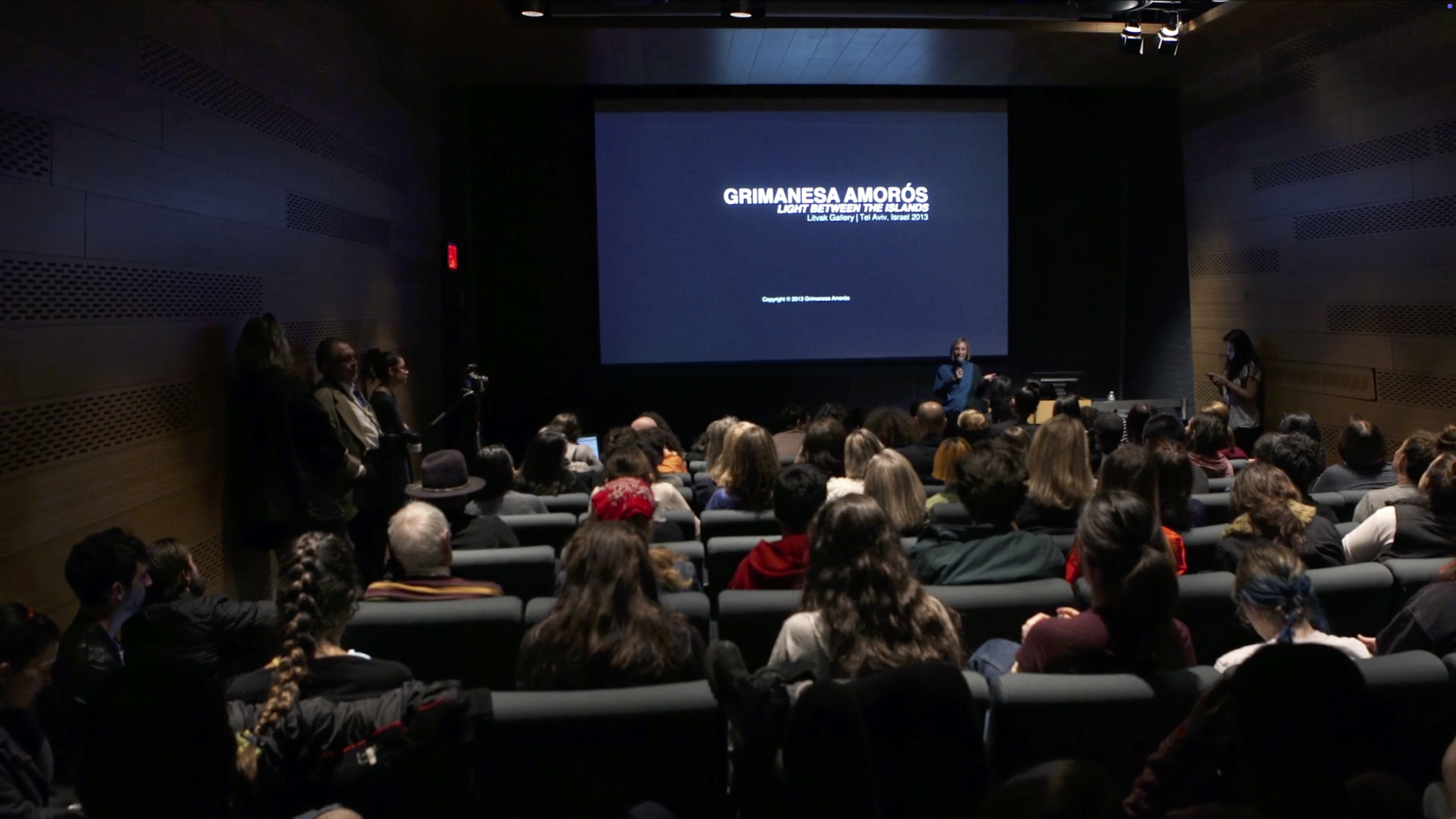
Inside the Anna-Maria and Stephen Kellen Auditorium, with Grimanesa Amorós on stage.

With a $7 million gift from New School Trustee and Parsons Board of Governors Chair Sheila Johnson, the complex underwent renovations and, in addition to classrooms and common areas, the building features the Anna-Maria and Stephen Kellen Gallery and Auditorium, the Arnold and Sheila Aronson Galleries, and the Parsons Making Center. The renovated ground floor now also contains the New School Archives, a collection of drawings, photographs, letters, and objects documenting 20th-century design. The building was designated a NYC landmark by the New York City Landmarks Preservation Commission (LPC) on May 18, 2021, formally recognizing its history of supporting organizations that advanced justice, civil and political rights, as well as democratic values.

=== Parsons East ===
The Parsons East building, located at 25 East 13th Street, is home to the School of Constructed Environments, which houses the Architecture, Interior Design, Lighting Design, and Product Design departments and studios. Additional facilities in this building include fabrication shops like the Laser Lab, Light + Energy Lab, the Metal Shop, the woodcutting shop, the Healthy Materials Lab, and The Fine Arts department and studios.

=== Albert and Vera List Academic Center & Library ===
The Vera List Center, located in the 16th Street building, features dedicated floors to design studies and development. Both the 6th and 12th floors are dedicated to the Design & Technology Bachelor and Master programs. The 8th floor is the List Center Library which is home to collections based in humanities and social sciences. These collections include but are not limited to periodicals, catalogues, manuscripts, and reserve items.

=== Performing Arts Library ===
The Performing Arts Library, located on the 2nd and 9th floor of Arnhold Hall on 13th Street, is where patrons can discover sheet music, scores, theater scripts, and endless collections of books featuring music, theater, and dance. The library offers reading rooms for students, faculty, and staff to utilize.

=== University Center Library ===
The University Center Library, located on the 6th and 7th floor of the new University Center complex on the main campus, features materials and holdings with heavy focus on art, design, and technology subject areas. Collections held here include periodicals, reserved ephemera, and more, all circulating. The library also offers reading rooms as well as collaboration rooms for students, faculty, and staff to utilize.

=== Archives & Special Collections ===
The Archives & Special Collections facility, located on the lobby level of the University Center, features rare primary source materials, records of notable individuals and organizations, unique publications, and vintage magazine journals. The Archives & Special Collections offers finding aids, past exhibitions, and digital collections.

Highlights from the Digital Collections include but are not limited to:

- Fashion Runway Slide Collection
- Collection of Prints by Eighteen British Artists of the 1960s and 1970s
- Fashion Look Books and Merchandising Collection
- Menswear Fashion Sketch Collection
- Fashion Print Scrapbook Collection

== Academics ==
=== Programs ===
Parsons offers over thirty undergraduate and graduate degree programs, each housed in one of five schools. In addition to their major at Parsons, students are able to take classes at the other divisions of The New School; The New School for Social Research, College of Performing Arts and Eugene Lang College of Liberal Arts.

- School of Art and Design History and Theory
- School of Art, Media, and Technology
- School of Constructed Environments
- School of Design Strategies
- School of Fashion

=== Admissions ===
The admission rate to Parsons School of Design is 52%. Though students have the option to provide them, Parsons does not require SAT or ACT scores be submitted as part of the undergraduate student application process. Most prospective undergraduate students are required to submit a portfolio of past artwork and respond to a special prompt called a "Parsons Challenge".

=== Ranking ===
In 2022, Parsons School of Design was ranked as the top art and design school in the United States in the QS World University Rankings, making this the fifth year in a row the school has held this designation. In the same report, Parsons ranked third globally in the art and design category. In 2021, Forbes named Parsons as one of America's top design schools. The school has long been prominent for its fashion design program, which is frequently ranked one of the best in the world.

== Expansion and affiliations ==
=== Parsons Paris ===
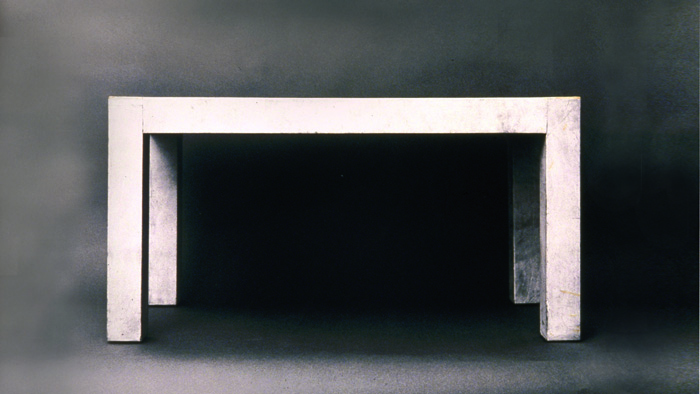
The Parsons table, designed in Parsons Paris in the early 1930s

Under the direction of Frank Alvah Parsons, a satellite school called the Paris Ateliers was founded in Paris in 1921. The following year, the school established its permanent location on the oldest planned square in Paris, the Place des Vosges. According to Parsons, "France, more than any country, has been the center of artistic inspiration since the sixteenth century. ... The value of associating with, and working from, the finest examples of the periods in decorative art, the adaptation of which is our national problem, needs no comment." The school offered courses in architecture, interior decoration, stage design, and costume design, adding poster and graphic design a year later. Among its supporters were interior decorator Elsie de Wolfe and author and interior designer Edith Wharton.

In 1931, interior designer Jean-Michel Frank led a group of students at the Paris Ateliers and created the Parsons table. In 1934, Van Day Truex, an alumnus of Parsons' NYC and Paris programs, became the director of the Paris Ateliers. An influential voice of 20th-century American design, Truex frequently brought in Parisian designers to critique student's work. Guest critics at the Paris Ateliers during this period include fashion designers Christian Dior, Jeanne Lanvin, Elsa Schiaparelli, and Jean Patou. Truex directed the school until its closure in 1939 due to the outbreak of the second world war. Parsons restarted its activities in Paris in 1948 offering a summer course combining travel and study. Parsons School of Design reopened the School (at first with a summer abroad program in the late 1970s) and became known as Parsons Paris. In 1980, Parsons expanded its Paris program, entering into an educational partnership with the American College in Paris (now American University in Paris), to offer Bachelor of Fine Arts programs and study-abroad options. Beginning in 1986, students matriculating in the Parsons Paris program were eligible to receive a degree from Parsons School of Design.

When the contract between Parsons School of Design and Parsons Paris expired in 2008, the former decided against its renewal. Parsons notified the Paris school that it could not continue to use the "Parsons" name. The Paris school challenged the decision and brought legal proceeding before the International Chamber of Commerce, which ultimately ruled in favor of Parsons. The Paris school, which continues to operate under the name Paris College of Art, is no longer affiliated with Parsons or The New School. In November 2012, The New School President David E. Van Zandt announced that Parsons School of Design would open a new academic center called Parsons Paris in Paris in autumn 2013. Located in the 1st arrondissement of Paris, Parsons Paris is taught by French and European professors as well as visiting professors from around the world. The school offers a variety of bachelor's and master's degrees in design, fashion, curatorial studies, and business. All classes are taught in English.

=== International partnerships ===
Parsons has affiliations with schools that operate independently but embrace Parsons' philosophy and teaching methodology. The Altos de Chavón School of Design in La Romana, Dominican Republic has maintained a partnership with Parsons since 1983, and it offers an intensive 2+2 program leading to an associate degree in applied arts, with many students continuing on to Parsons School of Design in New York for another two years to achieve their B.F.A. degree. Parsons is working with the recently formed Indian School of Design and Innovation in Mumbai, India with the aim of eventually being able to establish an exchange program. In 2014, Parsons established a pre-college in China called Parsons Pre-College China Program in partnership with XNode.

=== Cooper Hewitt, Smithsonian Design Museum ===
Parsons has a formal research and degree partnership with the Cooper Hewitt, Smithsonian Design Museum in New York for a two-year master's program in History of Design and Curatorial Studies.

== Notable people ==
=== Alumni ===
Parsons is known for being the alma mater to many influential theorists and practitioners in the field of art and design including painter Jasper Johns, industrial designer Sara Little Turnbull, pop artist Roy Lichtenstein, painter Edward Hopper, sculptor Alexander Calder, chief creative officer at Google Creative Lab Robert Wong, Bob Williams of Mitchell Gold + Bob Williams, artist Abby Portner, painter Julie Umerle, painter Norman Rockwell, Ryan Germick the designer of Google's doodles, interior designer Van Day Truex of Tiffany & Company, Pixar artist Peter de Sève, Alex Lee of OXO, Baggu founder Emily Sugihara, architect Rose Connor, photographer Duane Michals, artist and activist Ai Weiwei, film director Joel Schumacher, and painter Danielle Mastrion, interior designer Mario Buatta, and graphic designer and creative director Paul Rand also attended the school.

The school has educated some of the most famous designers in the fashion industry as well, including Donna Karan, Kay Unger, Scott Salvator, Marc Jacobs, Alexander Wang, Tom Ford, Anna Sui, Jason Wu, Narciso Rodriguez, Sophie Buhai, Jack McCollough and Lazaro Hernandez, Isaac Mizrahi, Samantha Sleeper, Irina Fedotova, Derek Lam, Prabal Gurung, Heron Preston, Sasha Meneghel, Jenna Lyons, Jo Copeland, Claudia Poh, Jasper Conran and Yeohlee Teng.

Notable alumni from famous families include Bella Hadid, Nicky Hilton Rothschild, Rina Bovrisse, Sailor Brinkley Cook (daughter of Christie Brinkley), Brooklyn Beckham, and Alexandra von Fürstenberg.

Notable Parsons School of Design alumni include:

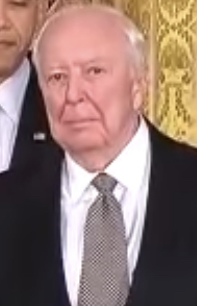
Jasper Johns: painter, sculptor, and printmaker

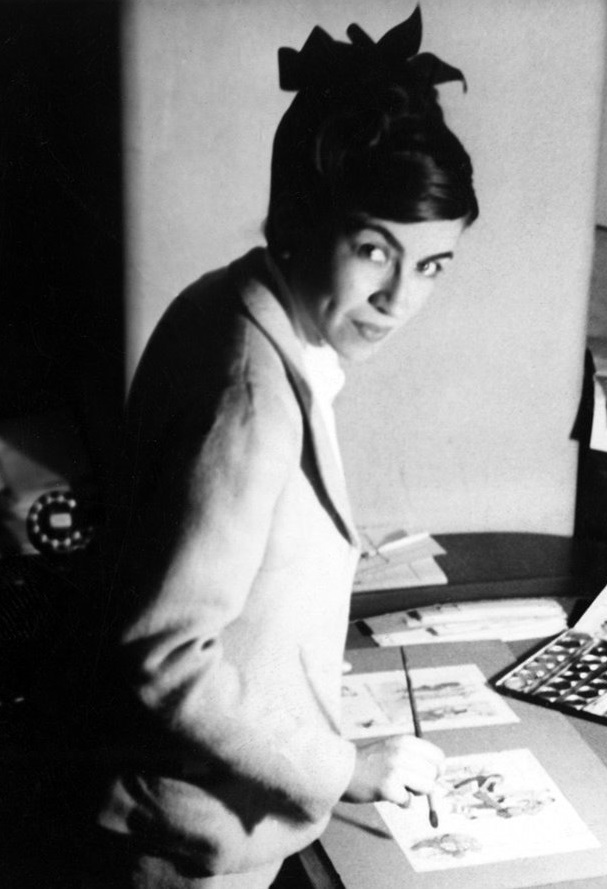
Sara Little Turnbull: industrial designer

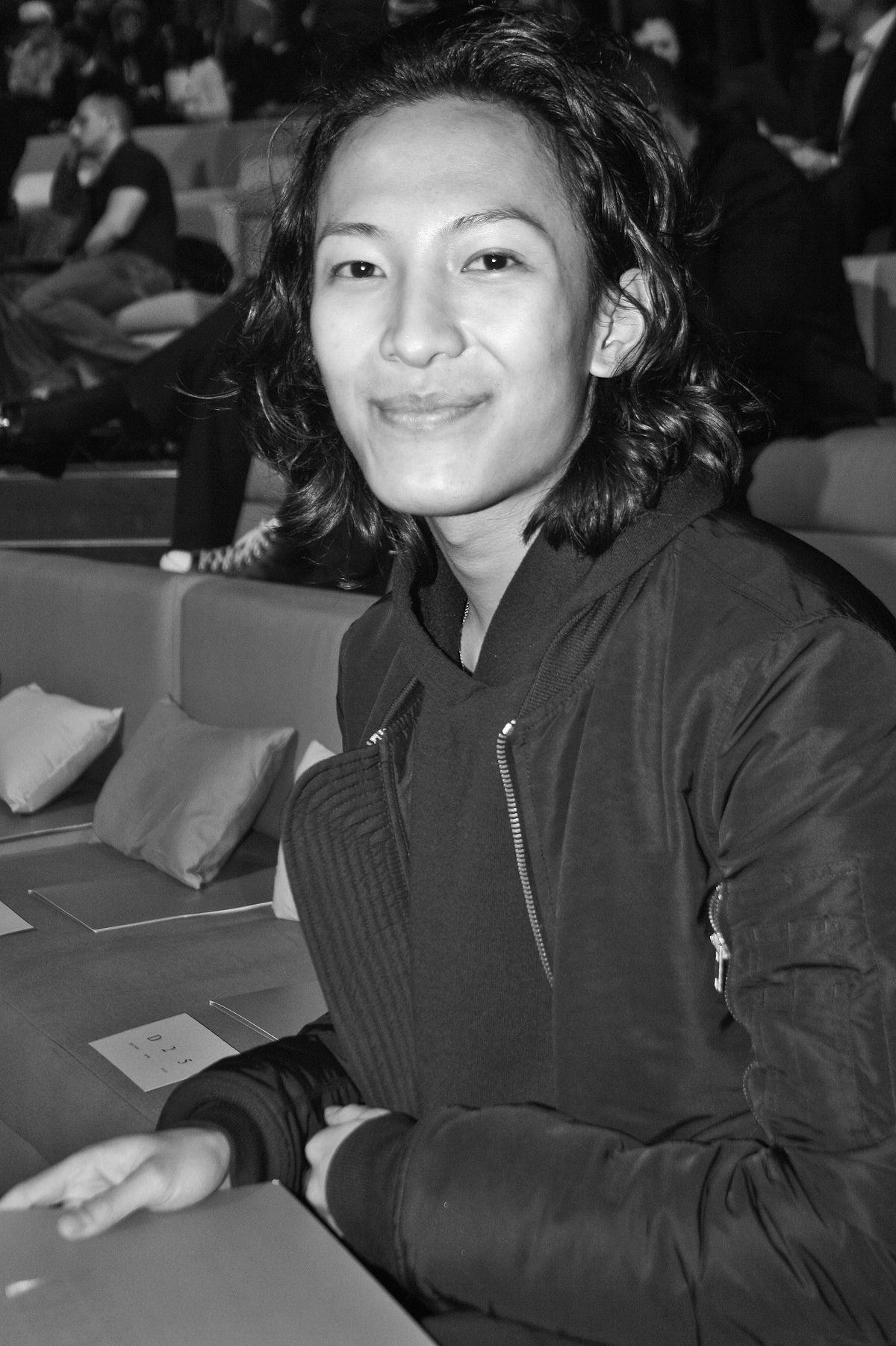
Alexander Wang: fashion designer

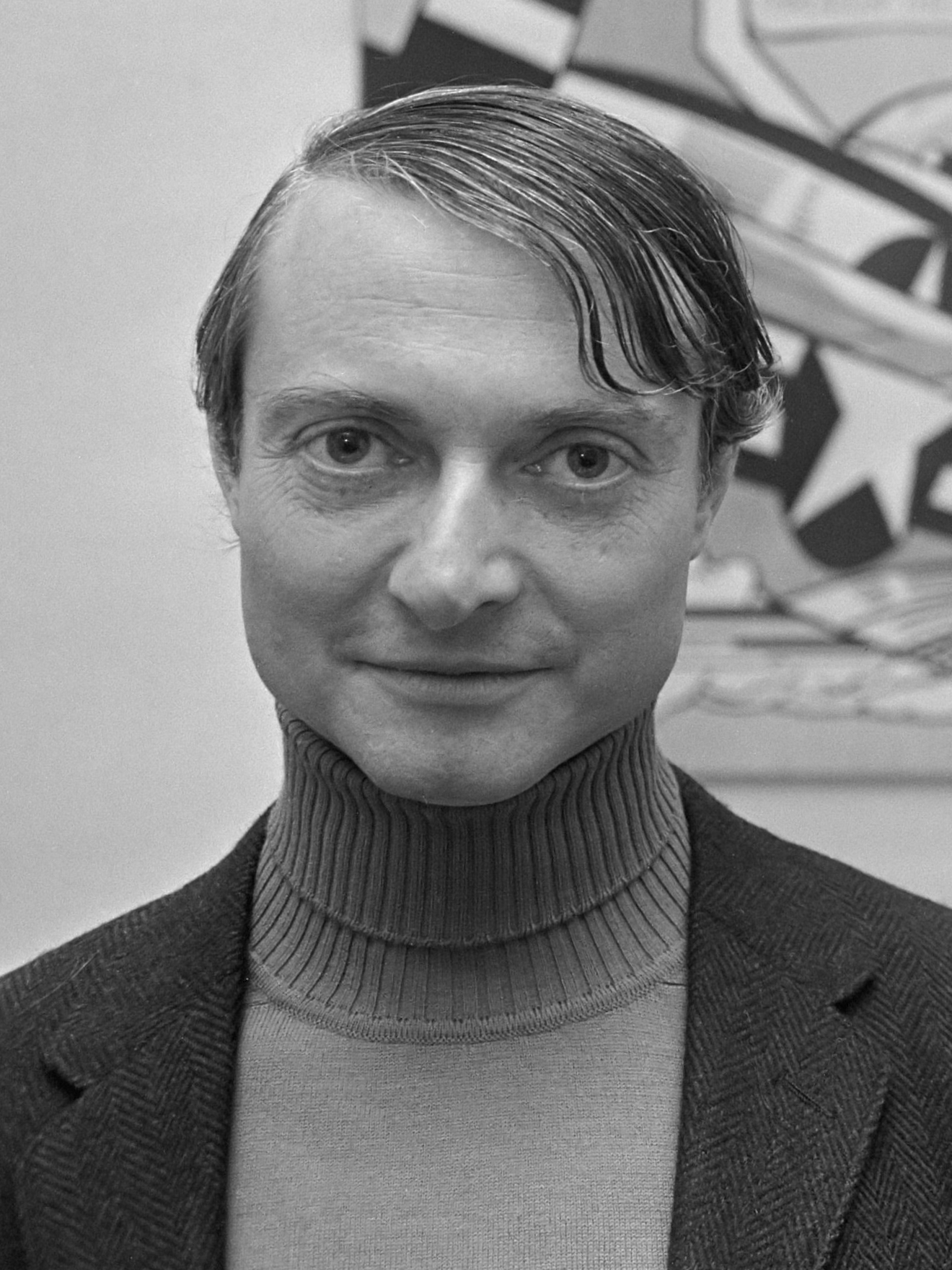
Roy Lichtenstein: pop artist

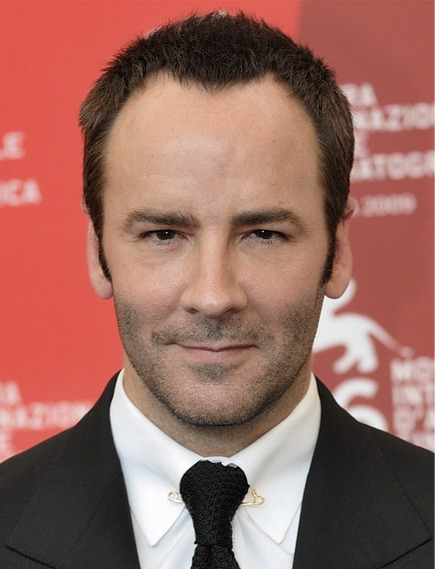
Tom Ford: fashion designer

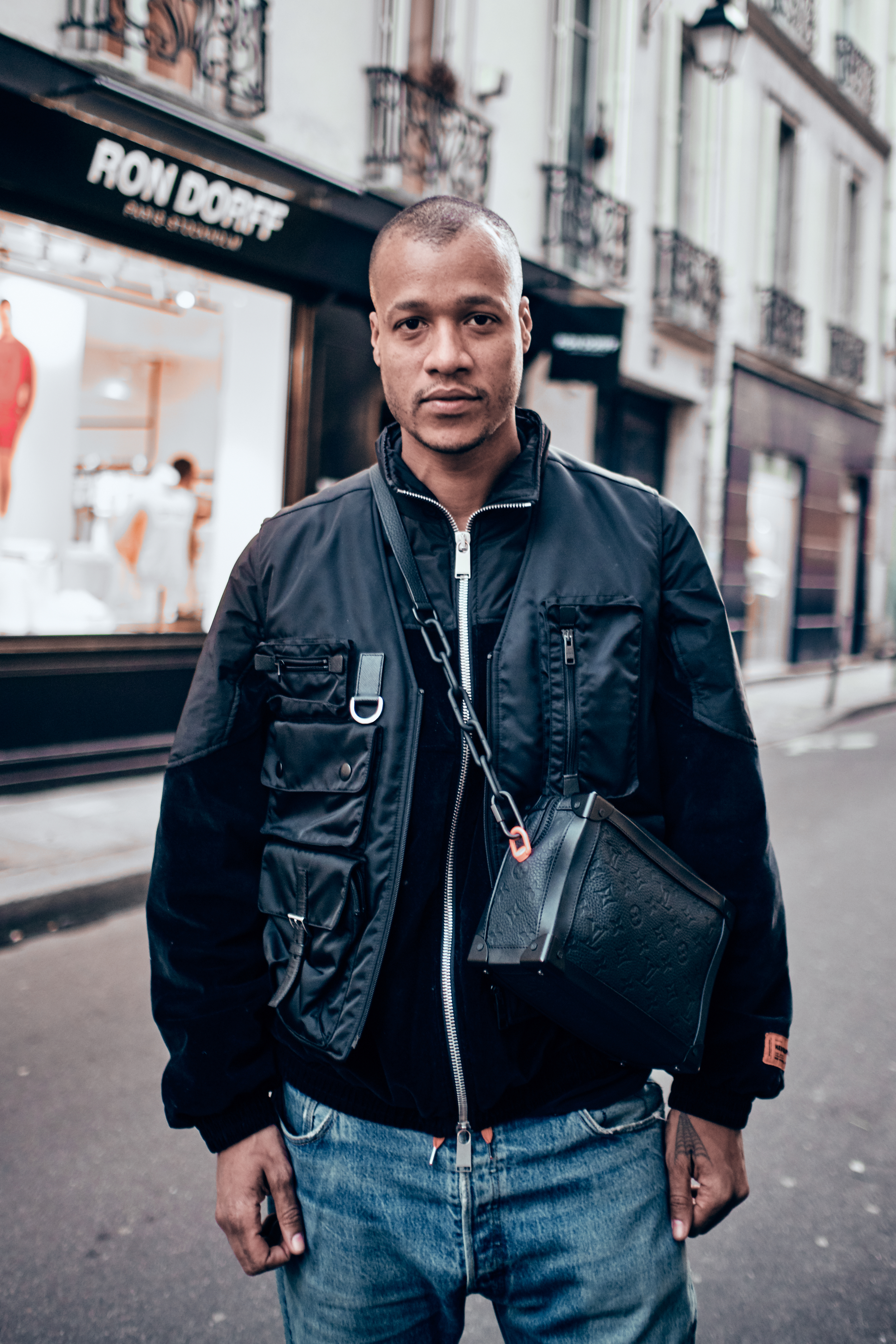
Heron Preston: fashion designer

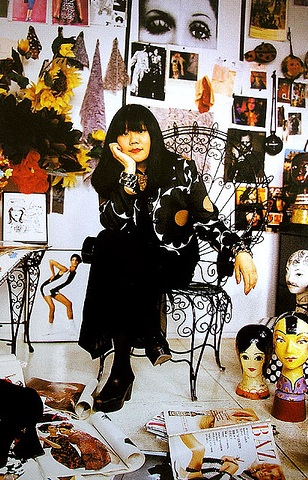
Anna Sui: fashion designer

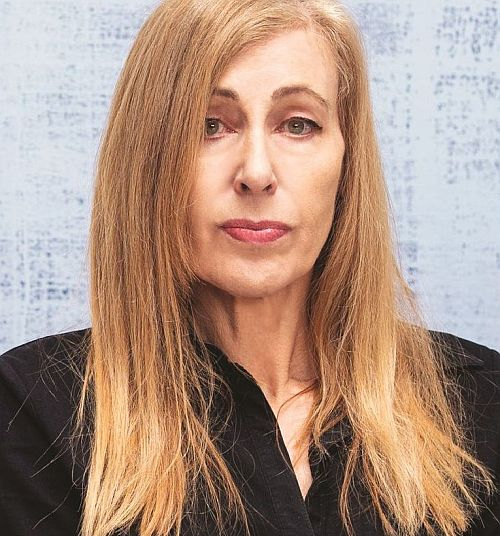
Julie Umerle: painter

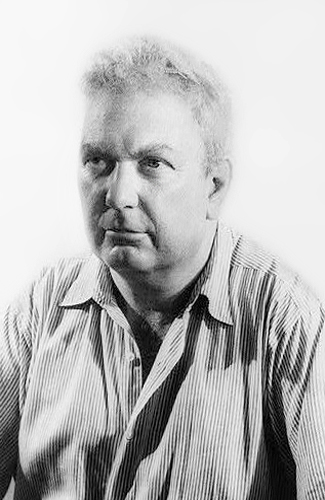
Alexander Calder: sculptor

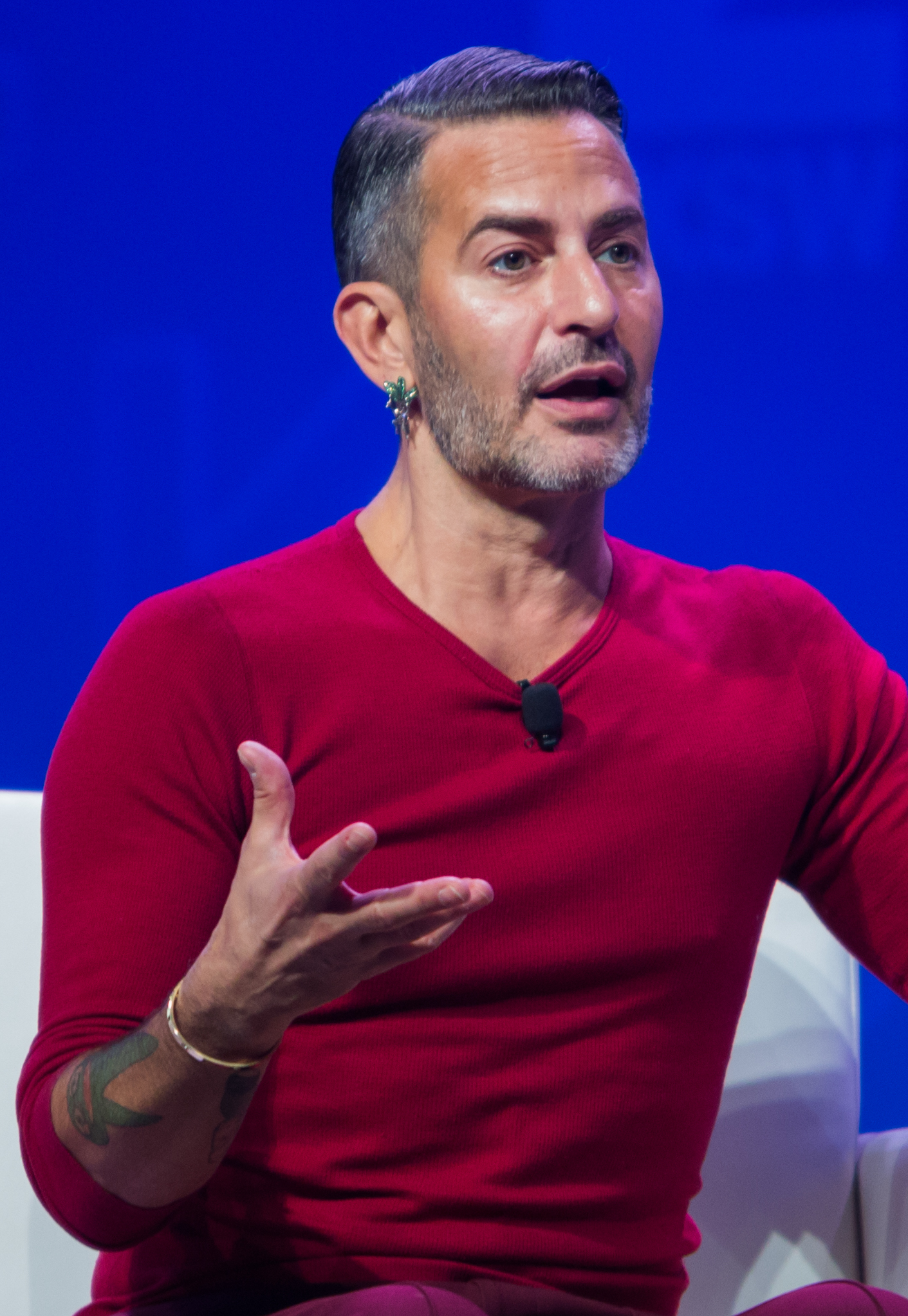
Marc Jacobs: fashion designer

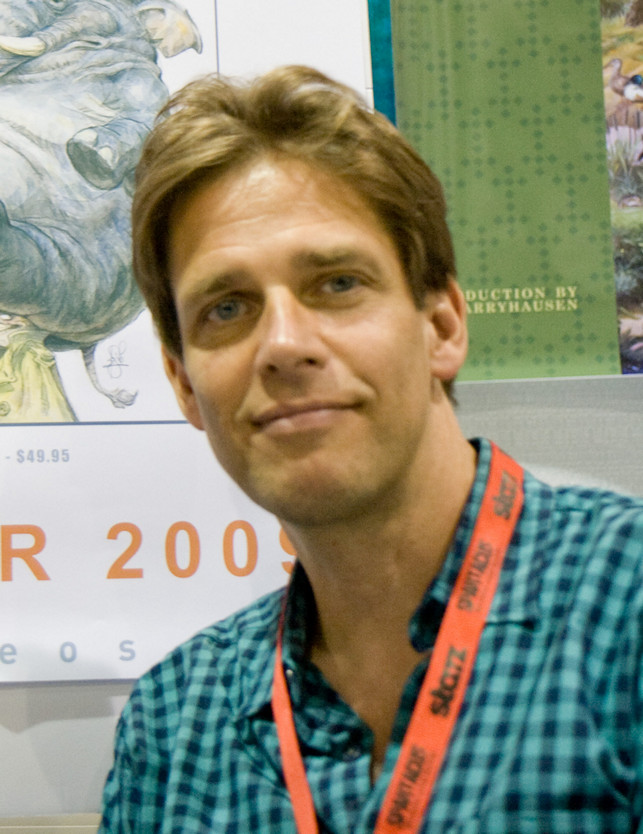
Peter de Sève: illustrator

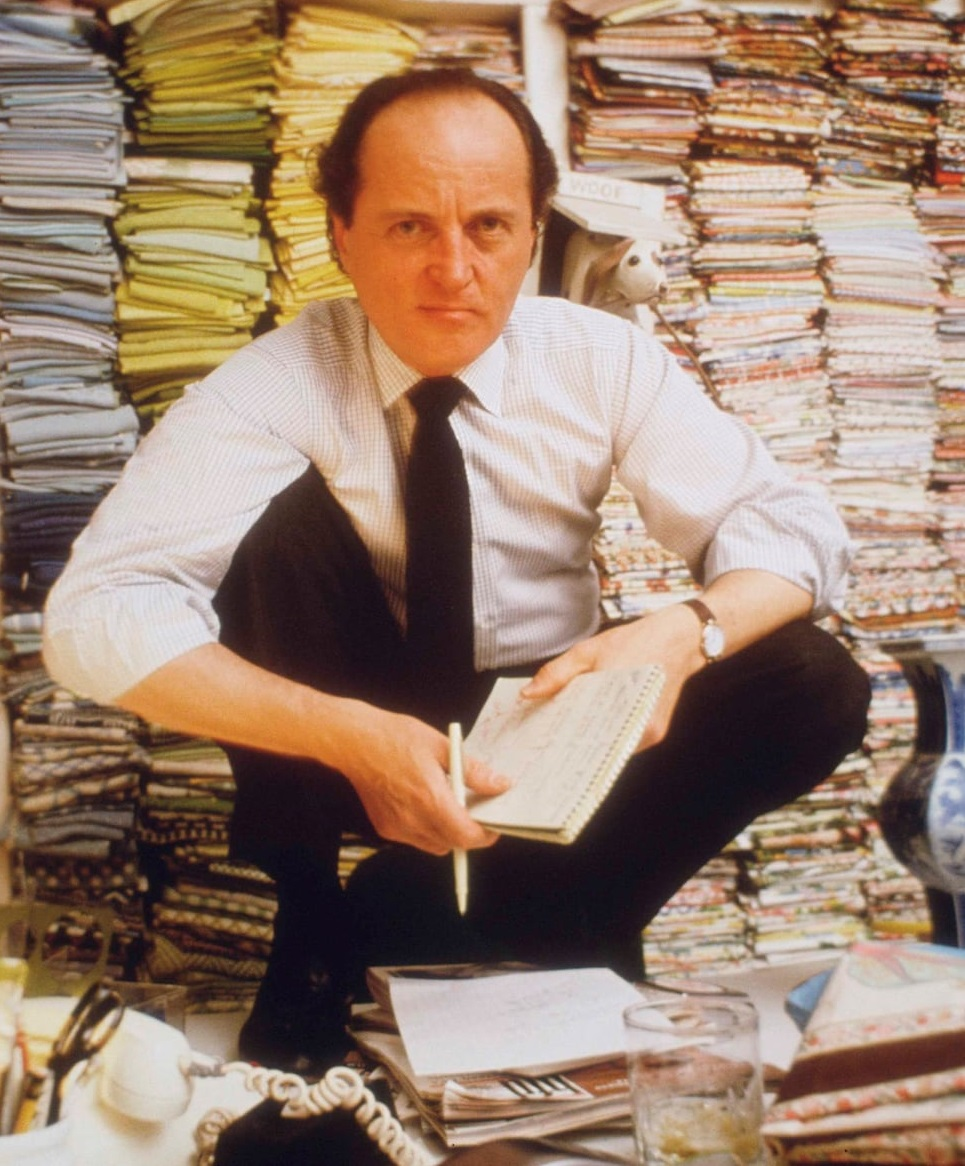
Mario Buatta: interior designer

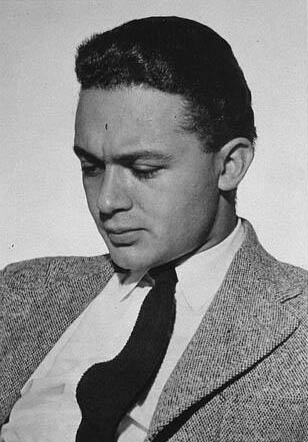
Paul Rand: art director and graphic designer

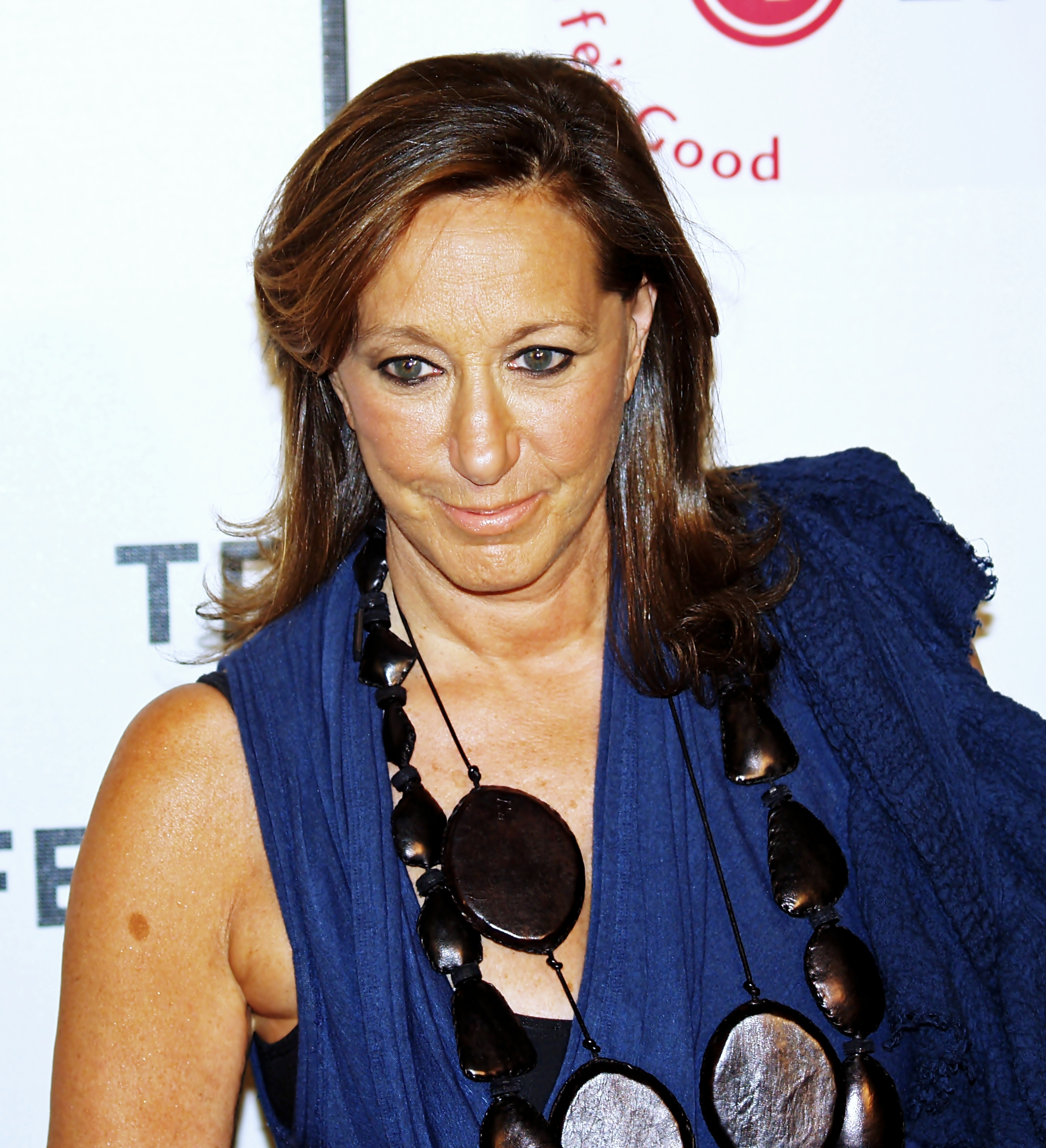
Donna Karan: fashion designer

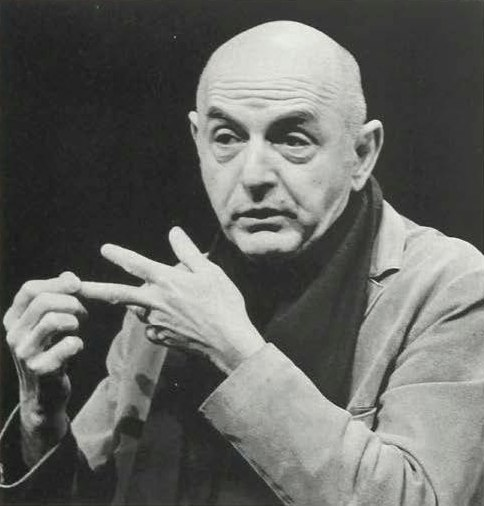
Duane Michals: photographer

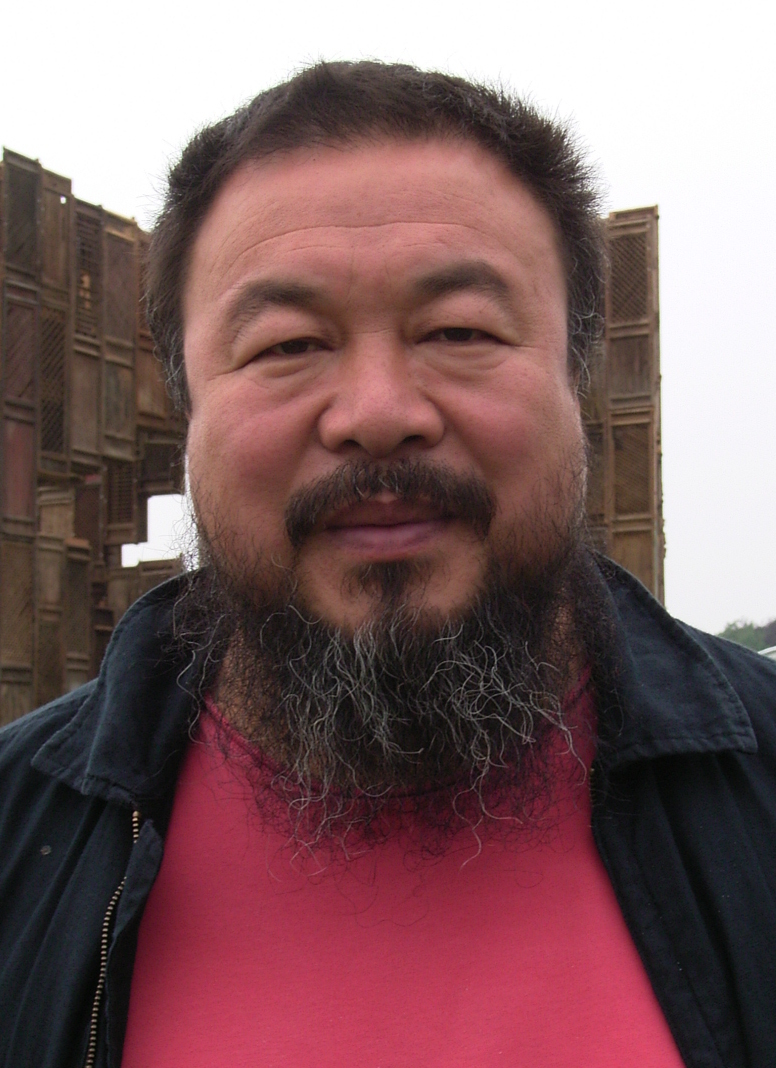
Ai Weiwei: fine artist, activist

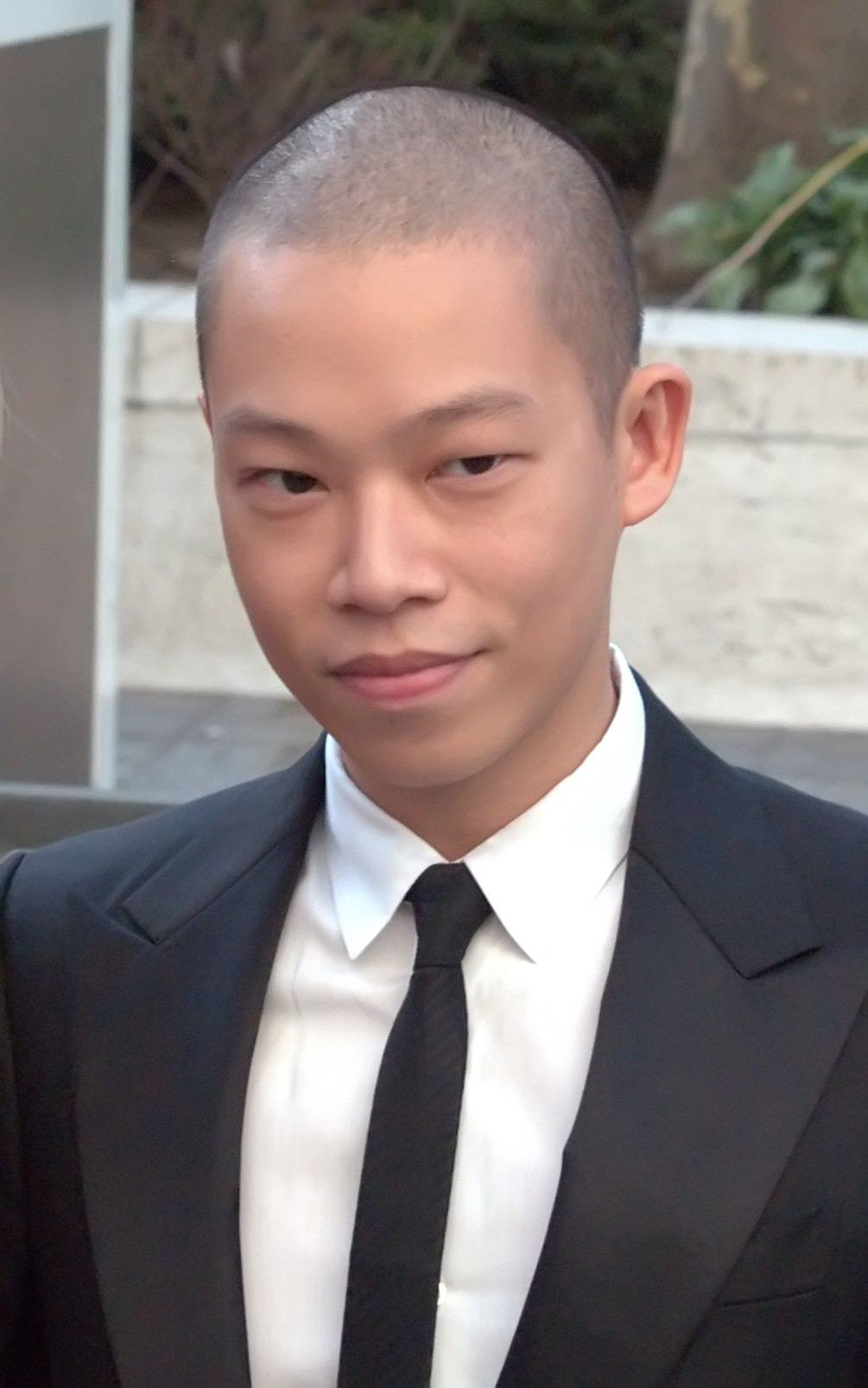
Jason Wu: fashion designer

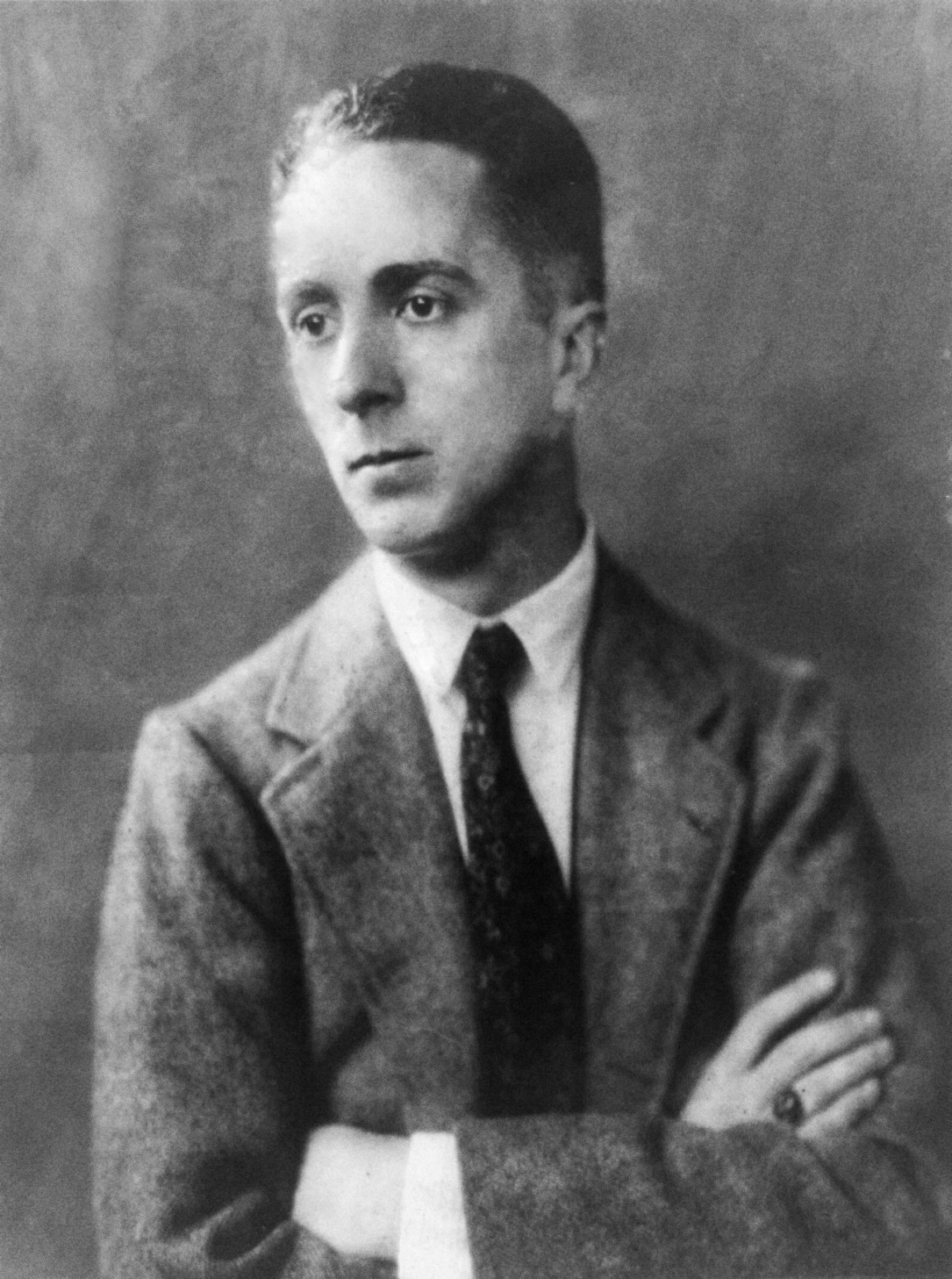
Norman Rockwell: painter, author, and illustrator

=== Faculty ===
There are 127 full-time faculty members and 1,056 part-time faculty members, many of whom are successful theorists and practitioners in the arts in New York City. The student:faculty ratio is 10:1. Notable faculty members include Frank Lloyd Wright, Piet Mondrian, Cipe Pineles, Tim Gunn, Letterio Calapai, Paul Goldberger, Emily Oberman, Ben Katchor, Lauren Redniss, James Romberger, Charlotte Shulz, Michael Kalil, and Peter Kuper. Many of whom have been a recipient of MacArthur 'Genius' Fellowships, Guggenheim Fellowships, Eisner Awards, and other industry awards.

== Student life ==
=== Students ===
Parsons has a total enrollment of over five thousand students, about 80% being undergraduate students and the remaining 20% being graduate students. A vast majority of the students are full-time. 35%, or about one third of the college is made up of international students hailing from 116 countries. The largest international groups come from Asia, followed by Europe. 80% students received some form of institutional financial aid between 2020 and 2021. In 2020, 70% of students self-report as female, 24% as male, and 6% as nonbinary. The New School is home to over one hundred recognized student organizations that serve the university's five divisions, including Parsons.

=== Publications ===
- The New School Free Press, abbreviated as NSFP, is a student-run newspaper covering events around The New School. Periodic printed editions are distributed in newsstands across campus, while their website publishes continuously updated content.
- re:D is the magazine for Parsons alumni and the wider Parsons community, published by the New School Alumni Association.
- Scapes is the annual journal of the School of Constructed Environments.
- The Journal of Design Strategies explores and documents collaborative work on the borders of management and design.
- The Parsons Journal for Information Mapping (PJIM) is published quarterly by the Parsons Institute for Information Mapping and focuses on both the theoretical and practical aspects of information visualization.
- BIAS: Journal of Dress Practice published by the MA Fashion Studies Dress Practice Collective started in the spring of 2013 and aims to join elements of "visual culture, fashion theory, design studies and personal practice through a variety of media.
- The Fashion Studies Journal is a monthly peer-reviewed academic journal for fashion scholarship and criticism. It was established in 2012 as a platform for graduate-level writing

=== Broadcasting ===
- WNSR, or New School Radio, is a student-run online-only news and opinion outlet for all divisions of The New School. Programming is produced by graduate and undergraduate students and delivered in the form of episodic streaming and podcasts. It was established in 2008.
- NSCR, or New School CoPa Radio, is an online radio station run by the College of Performing Arts (CoPa) and spans a wide range of genres, and features more than 400 artists, 500 albums, and 3,840 individual tracks and songs, all by students, faculty, alumni, and staff from CoPa divisions, including the School of Drama, School of Jazz and Contemporary Music, the Mannes School of Music, as well as alumni from the wider New School community. The station was established in 2021.
- New Histories is a faculty-run podcast show at The New School that focuses on the university's history.
- Public Seminar is a podcast dedicated to the intellectual and cultural understanding of democracy through the lens of design, the social sciences, performing arts, and humanities. Public Seminar is produced by New School faculty, students, and staff, and supported by colleagues and collaborators around the globe.
- Unbound is a student-run podcast show at The New School that focuses on philosophy.

== In popular culture ==
- In the film Heat, Neil McCauley (Robert De Niro) meets Eady (Amy Brenneman) at the coffee shop and asks where she went to school for graphic design. Eady tells Neil that she went to Parsons in New York.
- The TV show Project Runway was filmed in Parsons' fashion building, located in the garment district until the building's closure in 2015. One of the show's hosts, Tim Gunn, was a past director of the fashion school.
- Jules Vaughn, a character from the HBO series, Euphoria wishes to go to Parsons to become a fashion designer.
- In the film The Invisible Man, Storm Reid plays an aspiring teenage fashion designer hoping to get accepted into Parsons.
- In the film Mr. Baseball, Aya Takanashi's character, Hiroko, mentions she attended Parsons School of Design.
- In the HBO series Entourage season 2, episode 4 "An Offer Refused" Drama claims "I almost went to Parsons."
- In the film Prom, Yin Chang's character Mei Kwan gets accepted to Parsons.
- At the end of the TV show Mr Robot season 3, episode 10, a prostitute character mentions having a student loan debt to Parsons.

== See also ==
- Education in New York City
- New York Foundation – 1909 charitable foundation, NY, NY, US
- New York Intellectuals – Mid-20th-century American writers and critics
- Parsons table – Modernist table with square flush legs
- Project Pericles – Group of liberal arts colleges and universities
