= Parsons table =

Modernist table with square flush legs

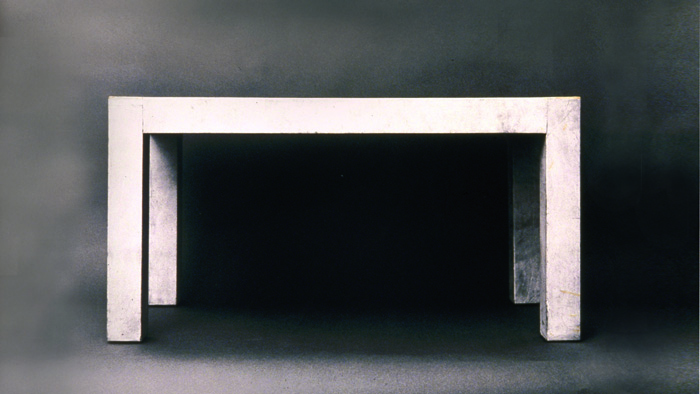

The Parsons table is a modernist square or rectangular table whose four legs are square in cross-section, flush with the edges of the top, and equal to it in thickness.

The Parsons table was designed by Jean-Michel Frank while he was working at Parsons Paris, then known as the Paris Atelier. While the form is generally credited to Parsons School of Design in New York City, according to an article in The New York Times that referred to Parson's archives, the table was developed out of a course taught at Parsons Paris by the French designer Jean-Michel Frank in the 1930s.

As the article states, "Frank challenged students to design a table so basic that it would retain its integrity whether sheathed in gold leaf, mica, parchment, split straw or painted burlap, or even left robustly unvarnished. What grew out of Frank's sketches and the students' participation was initially called the T-square table ... " The first example, as recalled by Parsons instructor Stanley Barrows, was constructed by the school's janitor and displayed at a student show.

The Museum of Modern Art (MoMA) exhibition in 2009-2010 presented the "Bauhaus 1919 to 1933", the entire course of the Bauhaus. A "Parson's" table, noted as a Children's table and chairs by Marcel Breuer, is documented in a photograph dating the table to 1923.

Parsons tables are often intended for use as modern or contemporary furniture, and their striking design has made them popular as coffee tables, dining tables, side tables, and occasional tables. Less-expensive versions are also available, which can be easily stacked, disassembled, and reassembled. Most are typically made of wood, metal, or plastic, and they are frequently employed in interior furnishings as well as patio or even lawn furniture.
