= Baggu =

American reusable bag and accessory brand

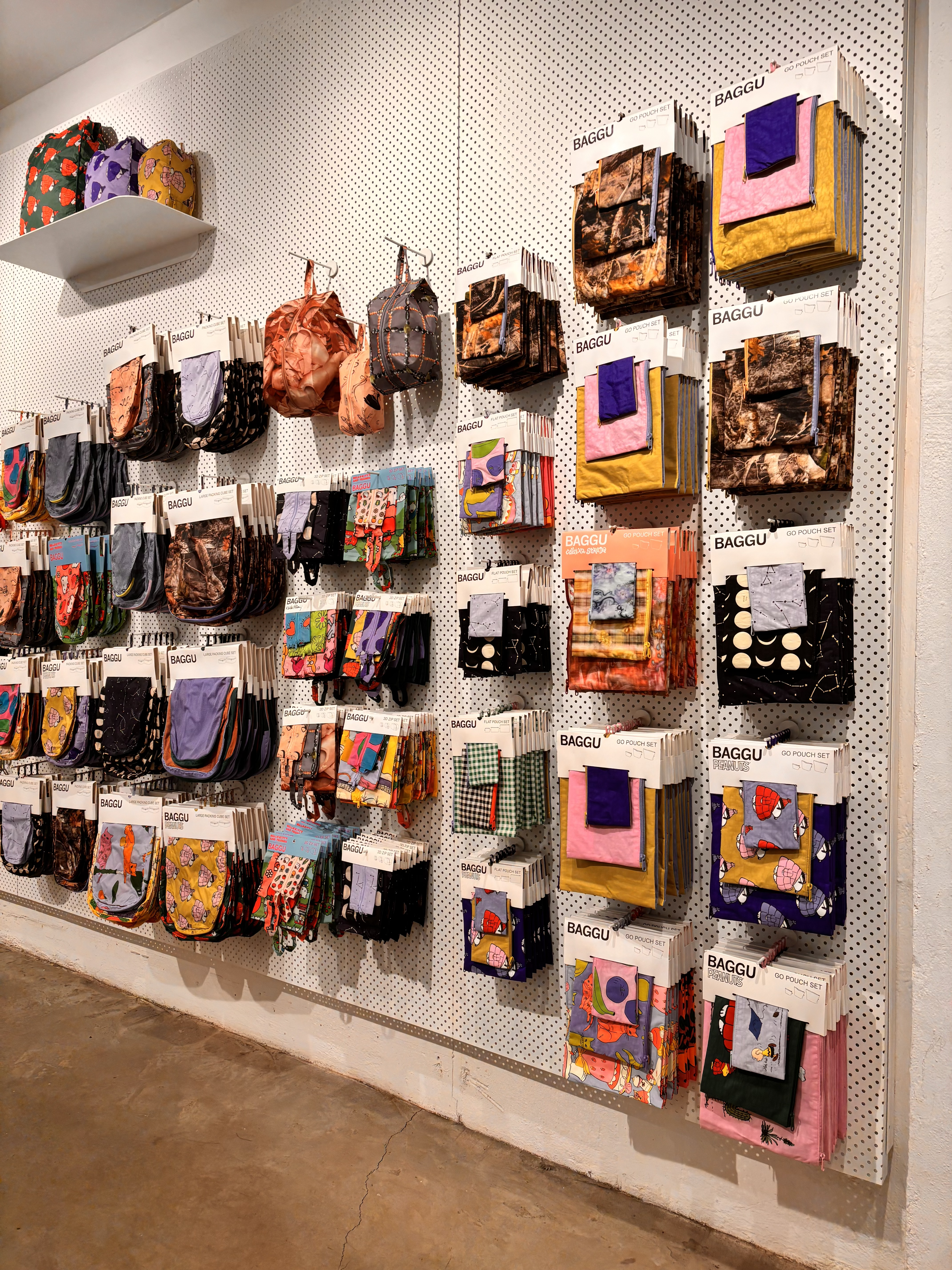
- Bags on display at the Soho, New York Baggu store
- Type: Private
- Industry: Retail
- Founded: 2007; 19 years ago
- Founder: Emily Sugihara
- Number of locations: 5 (2025)
- Products: Reusable shopping bags; Accessories
- Website: baggu.com

Baggu is an American brand that produces casual bags and accessories using recycled materials at a low price point. It is best known for its reusable shopping bags made from ripstop nylon.

== History ==
CEO Emily Sugihara grew up in Del Mar, California, attended Torrey Pines High School, and studied economics at the University of Michigan. At Michigan, Sugihara and her roommate sold screen-printed T-shirts online. She later studied fashion design at Parsons School of Design in New York City and worked at J.Crew as an assistant designer. In 2007, when she was 24, Sugihara, her mother Joan Hall Sugihara, and family friend Ellen Vanderlaan released the first Baggu bag. They wanted to manufacture the bags in her home town of San Diego, but the price point was too high and would have led to $40 bags. Production commenced in China instead.

== Products ==
The company launched with an $8 reusable shopping bag, and a focus on sustainability and minimal waste. Sugihara and her mother developed the original design; the basic bag remains mostly unchanged. Initial advertising in Teen Vogue led to a customer base of teenage girls who could afford the bags, found the colors attractive, and were drawn to the product's environmentally friendly focus. Each reusable shopping bag has the capacity to hold the equivalent of three plastic grocery bags. Crafted from 40% recycled ripstop nylon, they are strong enough to carry up to 50 pounds (23 kilograms).

The brand has a variety of products (and materials) in addition to the flagship bags, ranging from picnic blankets to bag charms. In 2011, the brand released a "sophisticated" collection of bags made from Argentine leather. In spring 2025, the brand launched a composite leather line, featuring a blend of recycled leather, recycled polyester, and a polyurethane coating.

== Partnerships ==
BAGGU has collaborated with numerous companies including No. 6 clogs, tie dye artist Shabd Alexander, J.Crew, Pilgrim Surf + Supply, West Elm, Fredericks & Mae, and ALL Knitwear. In 2024, Baggu collaborated with New York label Collina Strada on a collection which included bags, pouches, towels, a pop-up tent, and a picnic blanket. The collection received backlash after some fans discovered that the designs were in part AI-generated. Other fashion collaborations include Sandy Liang, Julia Heuer, and Molly Goddard. BAGGU also has released collections with Major League Baseball, Sanrio, and Disney.

BAGGU also partners with enterprise clients to produce custom designs. Clients and partners have included Honolulu Cookie and Urban Outfitters.

== Leadership ==
In early 2024, co-founder Ellen Vanderlaan stepped down from Chief Creative Officer to VP of Creative.

As of May 2026, Sugihara stepped down from CEO. The position is now held by longtime BAGGU employee Elise Polglaze. Polglaze held various positions at BAGGU over a 12-year tenure including project manager, Director of Marketing, and VP of Revenue before taking the CEO position in 2025.

== Reception ==
Baggu is popular among Gen Z, and inspires "mass adoration ... in New York, and far beyond". On TikTok, a community of self-described "Baggu girlies" and "Baggu baddies" post videos collecting and styling the bags, often participating in the "What's in my Baggu" trend—a variation of the popular "What's in my bag" format where creators demonstrate how much the bags can hold and personalize them with charms and matching outfits. The brand also utilizes community-driven marketing through its "Baggu in the Wild" campaign on Instagram and TikTok, encouraging followers to share photos and tags that showcase how real customers use its products in everyday life. Some commenters argue that Baggu's limited releases and designer collaborations promote overconsumption, and that the collector culture surrounding the reusable bags undermines the brand's sustainability.
