= University Center =

University Center or University Centre may refer to:

== United Kingdom ==
A term for a higher education provider delivering higher education courses in partnership with a university.

== United States ==
- University Center (Florida State University), Tallahassee, Florida, a multi-purpose facility around Doak Campbell Stadium
- University Center (Mercer University), Macon, Georgia, a multi-purpose facility
- University Center (Southeastern Louisiana), a multi-purpose facility in Hammond, Louisiana
- Baltimore Arena station, a transit station in Baltimore, Maryland formerly known as University Center/Baltimore Street
- University Center, Michigan, a locale in Bay and Saginaw counties
- University Center Rochester, Minnesota, a higher education facility
- University Center (The New School), New York City, New York

== Norway ==
- University Centre in Svalbard, a company that provides university-level education in Arctic studies
