= Sara Little Turnbull =

American product designer (1917–2015)

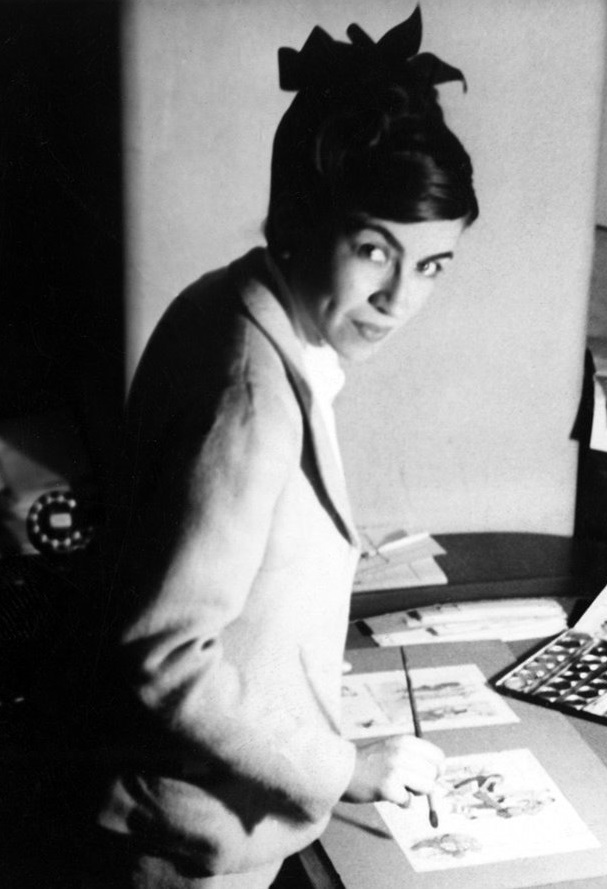
- Born: Sara Finkelstein; September 21, 1917; Manhattan, New York, U.S.
- Died: September 3, 2015 (aged 97); Seattle, Washington, U.S.
- Education: Parsons School of Design
- Occupations: Product design Industrial design
- Spouse: James R. Turnbull

Sara Little Turnbull (née Finkelstein; September 21, 1917 – September 3, 2015) was an American product designer, design innovator and educator. She advised corporate America on product design from 1935 – 2005, and has been described as "corporate America's secret weapon." She was one of America's early industrial designers and one of the first women to succeed in a male-dominated post-World War II design industry. She helped to create essential products from medical masks to space suits, and founded and led both the Sara Little Center for Design and the Process of Change: Laboratory for Innovation and Design at the Stanford Graduate School of Business. She approached design as a self-trained cultural anthropologist and believed that a thorough understanding of the fine-grain details of how different cultures behaved was key to successful and innovative business solutions.

== Early life and education ==
Sara Finkelstein was born on September 21, 1917, in Manhattan, New York to Russian immigrant parents in a modest household and was raised in Brooklyn. Her mother introduced her to the use of color and form by arranging fruits and vegetables in bowls. She was a child actress in the Yiddish Theater. In high school, she attended Brooklyn's Girls Commercial High School, where she received early accolades in design. She attended Parsons School of Design on scholarships from the School Art League of NYC in 1935 for her work in silk textile design and the National Council of Jewish Women, graduating in 1939 with a degree in Advertising Design.

Because she was 4 feet 11 inches (1.50 m) tall, she acquired the nickname "Little Sara," and then began to call herself Sara Little professionally.

== Career ==
=== Early career ===
During college, Sara Little worked at Marshall Field & Company (now Macy’s) as an assistant art director in illustration and package design, then as an art director at Blaker Advertising Agency. She was hired as an editorial assistant at House Beautiful magazine in 1941, where she wrote the "Girl with a Future" column until she rose to the position of Decorating Editor, which she held for nearly two decades.

At House Beautiful, she anticipated and helped develop the American post-World War II domestic lifestyle. By asking, "how can we help these people put their lives back together through ideas in our magazine?" She encouraged readers to use more informal space in the home (in what eventually became known as the family room), share living space with a roommate, and organize small spaces for maximum domestic efficiency. She lived for 20 years in a 400-square-foot (37 m^{2}) room at the Lombardi Hotel in Manhattan from which she also ran her international consulting practice).

When her sister was diagnosed with cancer in the late 1940s, she helped in paying the medical bills by taking on client work while working full time at the studio. This led to radical career success as she began designing packaging for Macy's private-brand products leading to an increase in her services. Some of her notable clients were Elizabeth Arden and Lever Brothers. Initially, she didn't know what to charge, but she compiled her sister's medical expenses to create her fee and her clients agreed. This experience was the turning point as she stated "I would never have been as successful—would never have done as much as I did—if I hadn’t been forced by circumstances. And you know what? I got paid, and then I got paid, and then I got paid."

=== N95 Medical Mask Design ===
In 1958, Little left the magazine world and formed Sara Little Design Consultant given the success of her client work. One of her first projects was doing product research for the company 3M leading to a user focused approach to design by considering the customer. She began in the Gift Wrap & Fabric Division where women were frequently placed, and the technology she used for gift wrap ribbons she improved upon by making a more comfortable bra cup from highly porous materials.

After spending much time in the hospital helping her sick family, she noticed the inefficiency of medical masks, and so she helped design and create a disposable medical and antipollution masks made from non-woven fibers. By 1961, 3M patented a mask based on Sara’s design. Utilizing the shape from the bra cup she had designed, the mask featured a bendable nose clip, an elastic tie, and a disposable material, which inspired the design details for today’s filtering facepiece respirators. However, the original mask had issues including an easy entrance for pathogens. In the 1970s, the Bureau of Mines and the National Institute for Occupational Safety and Health created the first criteria for what is known as ‘single-use respirators leading 3M single-use N95 dust respirator in 1972.

=== Independent Design Consultant ===
At the time, she wrote a trade article for Housewares Review entitled "Forgetting the Little Woman". Her premise was that most companies created products for retail buyers, instead of considering the people who were actually going to use them. The story caught the attention of prominent executives, including the heads of General Mills, 3M and Corning Glass. All three companies eventually hired her as a product research and marketing consultant to assist in finding new applications for technologies developed for the war effort. She also designed soy protein foodstuffs and the ubiquitous freezer-to-oven CorningWare that was developed from a material originally used on missile cones.

During her 70-year design career she was more than anything else a strategic design consultant. She was one of the earliest professional designers to promote human-centered design methodology, consumer awareness, and cultural change to an international slate of companies such as: Procter & Gamble, Coca-Cola, General Mills, Macy’s, Neiman Marcus, Marks & Spencer, American Can, DuPont, Ford, Nissan, Pfizer, Revlon, Elizabeth Arden, Lever Brothers, Motorola, NASA and Volvo. She collaborated on a range of domestic products including housewares, home storage systems, foodstuffs, the glass cooktop, microwave cooking products, personal care, medication delivery systems, cosmetics, new fabric manufacturing processes (knit and non-wovens), space suits, furniture, toys, decoration and packaging, household cleaning products, pet care, tapes and adhesives, and car interiors.

Many of her ideas arose from her intense interest in world cultures and nature. Her work often showcased what later became known as the principles of biomimicry. She traveled frequently to destinations such as Borneo, Malaysia, the Philippines, India, Japan, China, Kenya, and more, always on the lookout for how people and animals solved the problems of everyday living. Her design for a pot lid was inspired by observing cheetahs grasping their prey in the wild. “It always starts with a fundamental curiosity,” she said of her quest for innovative product design. “When I can't find the answer in a book, I go out and search for it. The excitement of my life is that I have always jumped into the unknown to find what I needed to know.” In another case, she began the design process for a burglar-proof lock by interviewing imprisoned persons.

== Educational career and contributions ==
=== Center for Design Research ===
Sara's goal was to "demystify design" increase its accessibility to all populations not just the elite. Her work has always been about the end-user, which let her to create her own laboratory so others could use her tools. The Laboratory tracks change internationally, collection articles since the 1950s and including topics in more than 375 areas including, education, healthcare, aging, sexuality, food and nutrition, housing, politics, and culture. Little used this information to fuel her design concepts. "The quality of life of a people dictates what they design, what they make," she said. "It's a reflection of life itself."

In 1971, she established the Center for Design Research at the Tacoma Art Museum in Washington State to archive and display her collection of over 3,500 artifacts gathered during her travels. The study collection includes body coverings and accessories, food preparation and dining implements, textiles, fine and folk art, much of which had influenced her concepts for domestic product design. These artifacts were used for her own inspiration as a part of her design methodology. The collection was deaccessioned from the Tacoma Art Museum in 2003 and has been re-established in Seattle, WA as the Sara Little Turnbull Center for Design Institute, focused on educating the public on design, and design scholarship for women.

=== Process of Change: Laboratory for Innovation and Design ===
In 1988, Little founded and, for the next 18 years, directed the Process of Change: Laboratory for Innovation and Design at the Stanford Graduate School of Business. In her work with students at Stanford, Little continually emphasized digging deep into the "why" of a product before leaping into the "how," in order to avoid designing products that only addressed superficial symptoms rather than the deeper need. Sara stated: “The designer is the conscience of the company. We can't expect anyone else to fill this role. That’s why the Process of Change Laboratory delineated the need to know more. Design requires a background of scholarship, otherwise, it remains a visual trick.”

On Sara’s passing in 2015, an educational, non-profit called the Sara Little Turnbull Center for Design Institute was created with her collections and a mission to educate the public about design. Now located in Seattle, Washington, it is open to visit by appointment.

=== Teaching, Awards and Honors ===
In addition to her work at Stanford, Sara Little was a guest lecturer at schools such as Parsons School of Design, Rhode Island School of Design, MIT, Harvard, Illinois Institute of Technology, Copenhagen Business School, University of Washington, San Francisco State University and University of California Berkeley.

She received a Distinguished Designer Fellowship from the National Endowment for the Arts in 1988; the Trailblazer Award from the National Home Fashion League (1980), and an honorary doctorate from Academy of Art University (2003). Also, in 1980 she is mentioned in the United States Congressional Record with distinction by Oregon Senator Mark O. Hatfield.

In 2008, Chrysler Corporation established the Chrysler Sara Little Turnbull Scholarship at Academy of Art University. The Modern Art Council of the San Francisco Museum of Modern Art designated her a "Bay Area Living Treasure" in 2001. In 2006, at the age of 89, Sara Little received the Lifetime Achievement Award from ico-D (International Congress of Graphic Design Associations), becoming the only person from the United States to do so.

== Board service ==
- 1948: Design Associate, American Institute of Decorators
- 1951–54: Alumni Board, Parsons School of Art and Design
- 1960s: Board, Home Furnishings Council (HFC)
- 1960-1980s: Board of Trustees, School Art League of the City of New York
- 1965–70: Board of Trustees, Parsons School of Art and Design
- 1972: Board Member, The Architects Collaborative (TAC)
- 1979: Board of Directors and Founding Board Member, Innovative Design Fund, Inc
- 1980s: Board of Directors, Tacoma Art Museum
- 1990s: Board of Directors, Corporate Design Foundation (CDF)
- 1991: Board of Directors, Long Term Care Implementation Committee at the Age Center Alliance, Inc.
- 1995: Advisory Member, National Design Forum
- 1998: Board of Directors, Tacoma Art Museum
- 2004: Board of Directors, Cooper Hewitt Museum and Committee for the Arts

== Personal life and death ==
At age 48, she married James R. Turnbull, then executive vice president of Douglas Fir Plywood Association in Tacoma, Washington. Later, when James Turnbull became executive vice president of National Forest Products Association, they moved to Washington, D.C., with an apartment at the Watergate complex. They were living there during the White House plumbers break-in. The couple had no children.

Sara Little Turnbull died in 2015 at age 97 in Seattle.
