= Sophie Buhai =

American fashion designer

- Education: Parsons School of Design
- Known for: Vena Cava, Sophie Buhai
- Children: 1
- Awards: CFDA

Sophie Buhai (born Sophie Suzanne Blondeau Buhai) is an American designer based in Los Angeles. She founded her namesake jewelry and accessories brand Sophie Buhai in 2015, and co-founded womenswear brand Vena Cava in 2003.

== Career ==
In 2003, shortly after graduating from the School of Fashion at Parsons School of Design, Buhai and her Parsons classmate Lisa Mayock launched Vena Cava with a loan of $5000. Both were working at vintage clothing stores at the time, and initially ran the business out of their Brooklyn apartments.

Known for its eclectic style inspired by references ranging from early Hollywood to Biba, as well as for its hand-drawn prints, Vena Cava developed a cult following and became strongly associated with the independent New York fashion scene. The line was eventually carried by 120 stores internationally. In 2008, Vena Cava was awarded runner-up honors from the CFDA/Vogue Fashion Fund.

In 2015, Buhai launched her namesake jewelry line, known for its contemporary interpretations of sterling silver modernist jewelry, as well as seasonal collections incorporating gold and semi-precious stones. The collections also include hair accessories. Sophie Buhai is stocked by major retailers worldwide including Matches Fashion, Net-A-Porter, Dover Street Market, SSENSE, Moda Operandi, and Mytheresa, as well as art and design institutions including the Georgia O'Keeffe Museum and the Cooper Hewitt, Smithsonian Design Museum.

Buhai's pieces are handmade by artisans in Los Angeles. The company's sustainability efforts include: utilizing recycled sterling silver and other materials sourced with an emphasis on environmental and social responsibility; a focus on local production; waste and carbon-footprint reduction efforts throughout the supply chain; and producing pieces primarily made to order.

From 2015 to 2017, Buhai also designed jewelry collections for the French fashion house Lemaire.

== Early life and family ==
Buhai was born in Los Angeles. Her mother is a psychotherapist, and her father is a comedy writer. She is a fifth-generation Angeleno. Her great-great-grandfather was an early Hollywood resident who emigrated from France in the 1880s. Gertrude Stein is a cousin on her maternal grandfather's side.

Buhai attended Marlborough School (Los Angeles) and was named a California Arts Scholar in high school. At age 18, she moved to New York City to study at the School of Fashion at Parsons School of Design.

Currently, Buhai lives in Los Angeles with her family.
