= Samantha Sleeper =

Fashion designer

Samantha Sleeper is an American fashion designer based in New York City known for her wedding dress designs.

== Biography ==
Sleeper is from Highland Park, Illinois, where she graduated from Highland Park High School in 2005. Sleeper earned a BFA from Parsons School of Design in 2009, where she majored in Fashion Design. Her first collection was featured on the cover of Women's Wear Daily as part of their 2010 article on "Globe Runners". After launching her debut wedding dress collection, it was named a brand to watch by the bridal publication The Knot: "Using luxe, eco-conscious materials and couture techniques, she creates pieces that are romantic and ladylike with an edgy, bohemian twist. In her debut collection, she plays with color, classic silhouettes, airy fabrics and lace to create dresses that are effortless, elegant and truly unique."

The website Cool Hunting interviewed Sleeper in 2012 regarding her usage of "lace collaging", an "eco-conscious" design technique which involves using "remnants of the intricate fabric to create one-of-a-kind handmade pieces." In 2016, Sleeper launched her second company, Swan Bridesmaid, intended to focus on sustainability.

Sleeper designed the wedding dresses for the 2019 wedding of country singer Carly Pearce and the 2021 wedding of actress Jamie Gray Hyder. A 2019 New York Times article on Brooklyn bridal boutiques featured Sleeper's "romantic and ethereal" wedding dresses at her store in Gowanus.

In 2020, director of the Cooper Hewitt, Smithsonian Design Museum Caroline Baumann was forced to resign after the museum's investigation into how she obtained the venue for her 2018 wedding and her Samantha Sleeper-designed wedding dress. Sleeper later told Women's Wear Daily that "On my end, there was no impropriety, no scandal, no story." The controversy resulted in Sleeper receiving more dress inquiries. Later that year, Sleeper organized a face mask sewing and distribution service for healthcare providers in Brooklyn in the midst of the COVID-19 pandemic. Fashion designer Jamie McCarty later joined, with Smithsonian Magazine writing in March 2020 that Sleeper and McCarty's "operation now has six neighborhood leaders, five runners and 34 sewers or potential sewers" and that "they had completed at least 163 masks and signed up to sew more than a thousand".
