= Paris College of Art =

Private college of art and design in Paris, France

Coordinates: 48.8790°N 2.3513°E

- Former names: Parsons Paris (1981-1986); École Parsons à Paris (1986-2010)
- Type: Private Art and Design School
- Established: 1981; 45 years ago
- Parent institution: Parsons School of Design (1981-2010)
- Accreditation: NASAD; NECHE
- President: Linda Jarvin
- Undergraduates: 300
- Location: Paris, France
- Campus: Urban
- Colors
- Website: www.paris.edu

Paris College of Art, formerly Parsons Paris, is a private international college of art and design with U.S degree-granting authority and accreditation from the National Association of Schools of Art and Design (NASAD) located in Paris, France.

Despite its American accreditations (NASAD, NECHE), the Paris School of Art has no academic (MESR) or professional (RNCP) recognition from the French government. It only has authorization to operate from the Rector of Paris under code 0754587D.

== History ==
In 1981, the school was established as a French Association (type 1901) under the name "École Parsons à Paris".

Until 2010, the school had a relationship with Parsons School of Design, and was known as "Parsons Paris". Its association with Parsons ended in 2010, and it became an independent institution and changed its name to Paris College of Art. PCA has 300 students and 100 faculty members from more than 50 countries.

The school is owned by the French group Hildegarde, which is owned by Reginald de Guillebon.

== Education ==
PCA has accreditation from the U.S. National Association of Schools of Art and Design (NASAD) and is part of the International Association of Universities and Colleges of Art, Design and Media Cumulus Association. It is also authorized by the Rectorat de Paris as a private school of higher education.

Its partnerships include agreements and research with the Centre de Recherche du Château de Versailles, Pantheon-Sorbonne University, the Centre Georges Pompidou, Les Arts Décoratifs, and La Maison Lesage. Degree courses are taught in English.

== See also ==
- Parsons Paris
