= Jean-Michel Frank =

French interior designer (1895–1941)

- Born: 28 February 1895
- Died: 8 March 1941
- Occupation: Designer
- Parents: Leon Frank (father); Nanette Loewi (mother)
- Relatives: Otto Frank (first cousin) Anne Frank (first cousin once removed)

Jean-Michel Frank (28 February 1895 – 8 March 1941) was a French interior designer known for minimalist interiors decorated with plain-lined but sumptuous furniture made of luxury materials, such as shagreen, mica, and intricate straw marquetry. He was particularly skilled in incorporating exotic patterns into veneers, including those of snake and sharkskin. His work gained widespread recognition in the 1930s, as the select, higher classes increasingly sought after his furniture designs. He is particularly noted for his association with the Art Deco movement.

== Early life ==
Jean-Michel Frank was born in Paris, a son of Léon Frank, a banker, and his wife and cousin, the former Nanette Frank. He was a first cousin of Otto Frank, the cousin-in-law of Edith Frank and, therefore, a first cousin, once removed, of the diarist Anne Frank.

Frank was fluent in French, English and German. During school, he was bullied by his classmates for being Jewish; this was during the time in which the Dreyfus Affair divided France.

World War I came with many challenges for the Frank family. First, it disrupted Frank's original plans to go into the field of law or banking. From 1904, he attended the Lycée Janson de Sailly in Paris and began law school in 1911. However, his two older brothers, Oscar and Georges, were sent off to fight in the war and died within two months of each other in 1915. Both of Frank's parents were German nationals, so they were placed under house arrest. After losing his civil rights and money, Frank's father was fearful of being taken by the Germans. On 11 November 1915, he committed suicide by jumping from the window of his apartment. Frank's mother became depressed and eventually died in 1928 after being in a Swiss asylum for several years. Distressed by the deaths he had experienced, Frank had depression throughout his whole life. He also became addicted to drugs, particularly opium.

== Career ==
Frank found himself with a substantial family inheritance, enabling him to travel around Paris from 1920 to 1925. His newfound wealth also allowed him to become acquainted and work with an elite network of people. In Venice he met the cosmopolitan society that gathered around Stravinsky and Diaghilev. Around 1927, Eugenia Errázuriz introduced him to 18th century styles and her own modern, minimalist aesthetic, and she became his mentor. Though Frank never received any formal training or education in the design field, his use of natural materials and simplicity were widely favored.

Frank sought to design spaces that were uncluttered and that featured neutral color schemes and exotic patterns. His idea of simplicity extended to everything including his wardrobe—he owned forty of the exact same gray flannel shirts. Frank drew inspiration from Ancient Egypt, Louis XVI, and the Art Deco movement. According to Frank, "the noble frames that came to us from the past can receive today's creations." Throughout his career, Frank collaborated with designers and artists such as Diego Giacometti, Salvador Dalí, Emilio Terry, and Christian Berard.

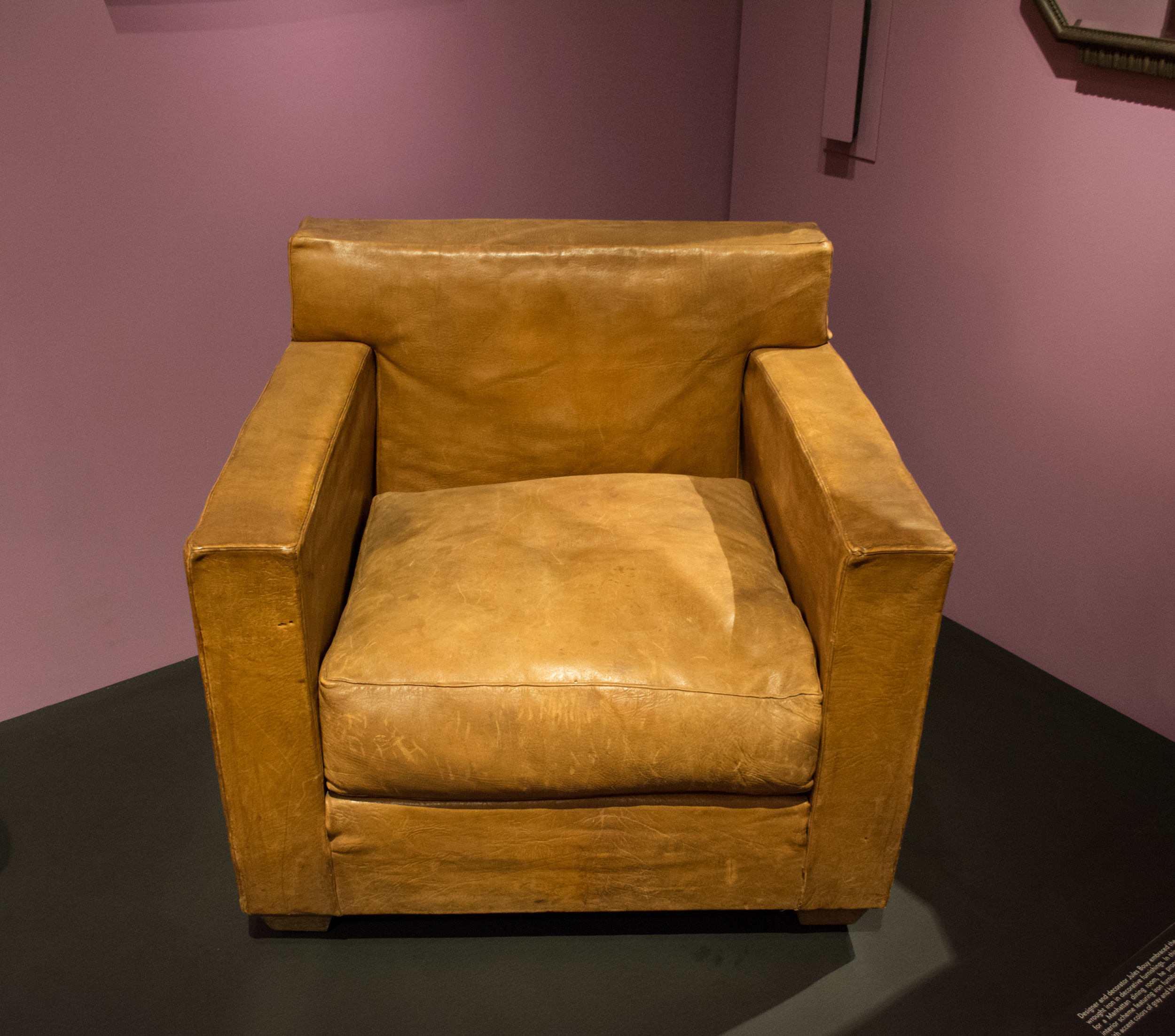
This is Jean-Michel Frank's Club Chair made from sheepskin. In 1924, Jean Rene Guerrand commissioned Frank to design upholstered furniture and chairs. Frank stripped away decoration and emphasized craft and simplicity. The Club Chair comes in a variety of colors and is an inspiration for designers today.

In the 1920s, Frank and Adolphe Chanaux, a Parisian decorator, met and inaugurated a collaboration that launched them into the center of Parisian art life. Frank and Chanaux searched for "balance" and developed a classic expression of spaces. Together, they decorated apartments for Jean-Pierre Guerlain, Marie-Laure de Noailles, and Louis Aragon. In 1924, Frank was commissioned by Jean Rene Guerrand to design a unique collection of home furniture. Part of this collection was the sheepskin Club Chair and Parchment-Covered Dressing Table.

During the 1930s, Frank was a teacher for design at the Paris Atelier, a satellite school of Parsons School of Design, where he developed the famous Parsons table. Frank challenged his students to create a table that would retain its integrity whether sheathed in gold leaf, mica, parchment, or even painted burlap. Thus, the T-square table was developed. This table got its name due to the perpendicular relationship between the leg and the tabletop. Constructed by a Parsons handyman according to the design drawings drawn by Frank's students, the table was first executed in New York for a student exhibition. In 1932, Frank and Chanaux opened a shop at #140 Rue du Faubourg Saint-Honoré.

In 1932, Jean-Pierre Guerlain commissioned Frank to design his new apartment on Avenue Hoche. The apartment contained of a selection of works by Frank including a pair of chairs made from oak and leather and a set of side chairs in a restrained Louis XVI style. His search for lines, curves, and mixing of materials lead him to Nelson Rockefeller's lavish Fifth Avenue apartment in New York in 1937. Nelson Rockefeller was one of the most legendary and wealthy public figures in the United States at the time. The Rockefeller living room included expensive furnishings, Aubusson rugs, armchairs, and 13 meters of green and white handwoven French silk.

He decided to leave Paris in 1940 after the Nazi invasion and received a visa to pass through Lisbon from Aristides de Sousa Mendes, the Portuguese consul in Bordeaux and travelled to Lisbon together with William (Thad) Lovett, who also received a visa from Sousa Mendes. While there they met Salvador Dali and Elsa Schiaparelli who mentions him in her autobiography. He later emigrated to Buenos Aires via Lisbon.

In Argentina, Jean-Michel Frank worked with his old friend and business associate, Ignacio Pirovano, on several private and commercial projects. Jean-Michel Frank kept his private apartment in Buenos Aires on the top floor of the company of which he was the artistic director in Argentina. This building was located on the corner of Florida Street and Marcelo T. De Alvear Avenue. He also visited many of his clients in Buenos Aires including the Born family, whose mansion in the northern suburbs of Buenos Aires was one of his many important projects.

Frank's pursuit of simple forms can also be seen in lighting designs. Frank's lights were classic-modern combined with exotic, textured materials, such as plaster, mica, obsidian, vellum, and terracotta. The "Block Lamp" is an example of his innovation by covering a rectangular block with a grid of mica sheets, an old technique from Roman artisans. The "X" lamp was composed of metal, wood, and terracotta in its raw, unglazed state. Alberto Giacometti collaborated with Frank in the making of terracotta objects like floor lamps, vases, candle holders, and table lamps.

== Death ==
Throughout his life, Frank was troubled by loss, depression, drug addiction, homophobic taunts and anti-Semitism. On 8 March 1941, while in New York City, he committed suicide at the age of 46. Despite claims that Frank died by throwing himself from the window of the Manhattan apartment he was staying in, he actually overdosed on barbiturates. Maarten van Buuren, Frank's biographer and a professor of modern literature at Utrecht University in the Netherlands, confirmed this when reading Frank's autopsy report and death certificate. Frank left the following suicide note, written in English: "I do this for no reason but ill health. I ask all my friends who have been so good to me to forgive me. I thank them deeply for trying to help me, but I have no strength to go on. I am too ill." His personal possessions were left in his apartment in Buenos Aires.

== Lasting impact ==
Today, Frank is recognized by leading designers around the world as one of the greatest sources of inspiration to many present-day designs. His works are highly sought after by leading collectors worldwide. Many of the premier auction houses offer his pieces, and prices are often in excess of 200,000 EUR. An important exhibition was mounted towards the end of 2010 at a leading gallery in New York's SoHo. This exhibition highlighted Frank's work with Comte in Argentina.

== See also ==
- Marie-Laure de Noailles
- Emilio Terry
