= Irina Fedotova (model) =

Russian model and fashion designer

Irina Fedotova is a Russian artist, model and fashion designer. She won the Gold Thimble, first prize award, at the 2012 graduate fashion show at Parsons Paris, where she earned a Bachelors of Fine Art degree in fashion design. Past winners of the award include Marc Jacobs, and Peter Som. Following which Fedotova worked as a designer for French luxury fashion brand Balmain. She has modelled for brands such as Dolce & Gabbana, La Perla and Missoni. Ottavio Missoni called Fedotova the "Russian Gisele", and she was chosen by the founders of Dolce & Gabbana as their main fitting model.

In April 2021, Fedotova made front page news in the United Kingdom when she was banned by Westminster Magistrates' Court from all clubs and bars in England and Wales for two years, after a physical altercation with two police officers. In August 2021, she challenged the judgment and subsequently won a Crown Court appeal case to have the national ban lifted, stating that she had "acted in self-defence."

She was on the front page of the Turkish newspaper Sabah's pullout Günaydın magazine in July 2022, while holidaying with her son abroad a yacht in Bodrum, and was subsequently interviewed by Turkish press in regards to her UK Crown Court appeal win. In July 2024, Jared Leto was invited to Bodrum, Turkey by Fedotova. In November 2024, Irina Fedotova was featured in OK! Magazine Russia, after being spotted outside Chiltern Firehouse, London wearing a United States Navy Cap, once worn by late Dodi Al-Fayed on his final holiday with Princess Diana.

In July 2025, Irina Fedotova made headlines in Russia's Moskovskij Komsomolets newspaper after her hotel room was robbed by a fan, who stole her passport and over $40,000 worth of her clothes, while Fedotova attended a private event hosted by Leonardo Di Caprio in Sardinia, Italy.
