= Bag charm =

Piece of jewelry that decorates a handbag

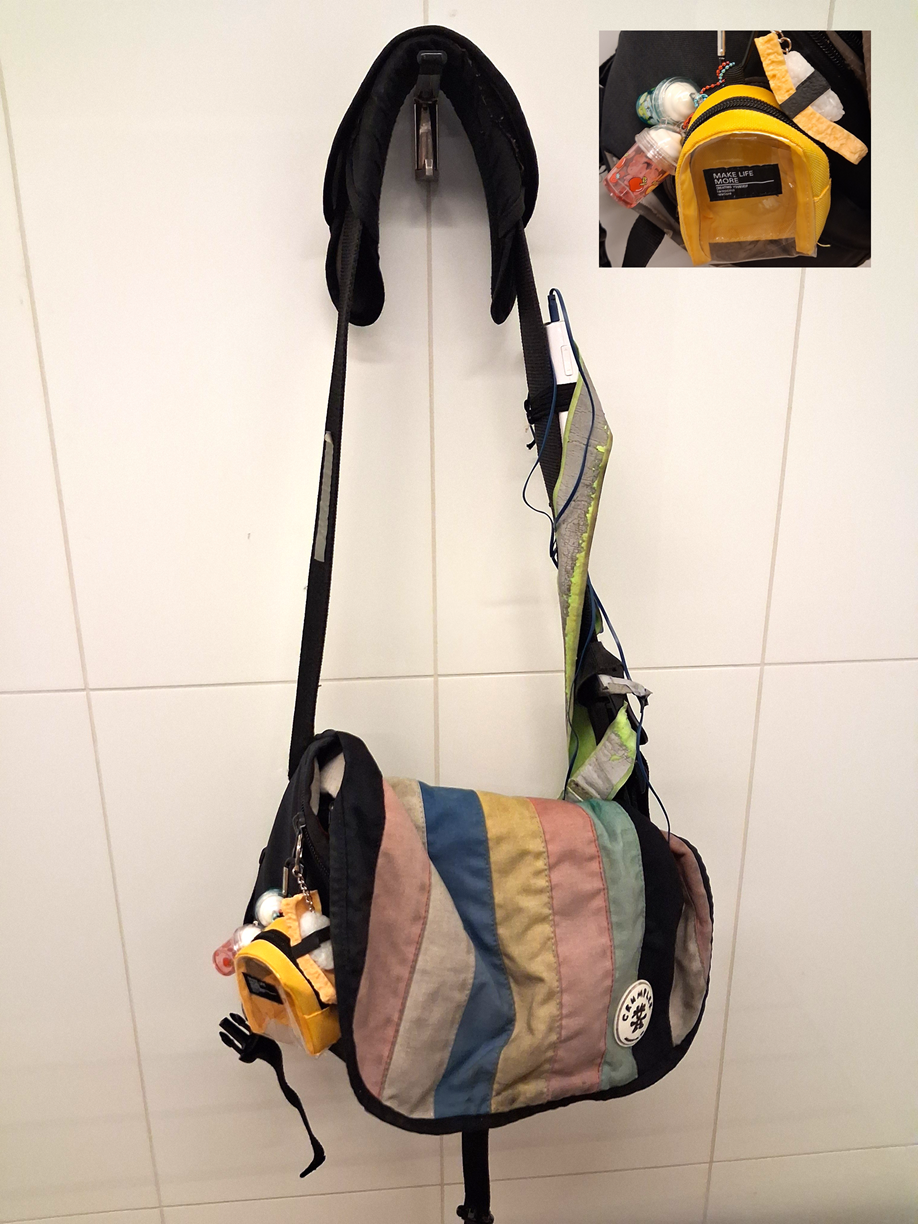
A messenger bag with inexpensive bag charms. The miniature backpack charm itself (see inset) has bag charms attached to it.

A bag charm is a piece of jewellery that decorates a handbag. Bag charms may resemble a keychain, a bracelet or a necklace. Bag charms may also be miniature plush toys like Labubus. Sanrio character charms are also popular, and they include one that is a sentient piece of salmon.

== History ==
While charms and charm bracelets have existed since antiquity, jewellery specifically designed to adorn hand-bags (as opposed to jewellery designed to be worn on one's own body) is a relatively recent innovation, with popularity rising in the late 20th century stemming from celebrity endorsements.

== Materials and price ==
Bag charms have been made from many different materials, including gold, steel, textile, leather, sequins, precious and semi-precious stones, and pearls. Some labeled pieces, have become collectable items.
