= Parsons Paris =

School of art and design in France

- Type: Private Art and Design School
- Established: 1921
- Parent institution: Parsons School of Design
- Accreditation: AICAD; NASAD; NYSED
- Dean: Florence Leclerc
- Students: 300
- Location: Paris, France
- Campus: Urban
- Colors: White, Black, Parsons Red
- Website: newschool.edu/parsons-paris

Parsons Paris is a degree-granting school of art and design in the 1st arrondissement of Paris, France. It is the European branch campus of Parsons School of Design and part of The New School, a comprehensive university in New York City.

Despite its American accreditations (AICAD, NASAD, etc.), Parsons Paris has no academic (MESR) or professional (RNCP) recognition from the French government. It only has authorization to operate from the Rector of Paris.

== Academics ==
Parsons Paris currently offers bachelor's and master's degree programs, as well as study-abroad and summer programs that reflect several core areas of study at Parsons School of Design in New York. These programs include:

- Art, Media and Technology BFA
- Fashion Design BFA
- Fashion Design & the Arts MFA
- Fashion Studies MA
- Strategic Design and Management BBA

Students make full use of the setting in Paris and Europe by connecting with local creative practitioners, cultural and civic organizations and events such as Musée des Arts Décoratifs, the Maison et Objet design trade show, and Paris Fashion Week. The school features a teaching faculty of French and European design educators as well as visiting professors from around the world. Classes are held at 45 Rue de Saint-Roch as well as other sites in Paris. Students are able to supplement their studies through online classes or by spending up to two years at the main Parsons campus in New York City.

All courses are taught in English.

== History ==
=== Background ===
The New York Times has described the new Paris campus as "both the oldest and newest overseas branch of an American university". The presence of Parsons in Paris dates back to 1921, when Frank Alvah Parsons opened the Paris Ateliers of the then New York School of Fine and Applied Art. The following year, the school made its home on the oldest planned square in Paris, the Place des Vosges. The school offered courses in architecture, interior decoration, stage design, and costume design, adding poster and graphic design a year later.

After closing before the onset of World War II in 1939, Parsons restarted its activities in Paris in 1948 offering a summer course combining travel and study. It reopened the school (at first with a summer abroad program in the late 1970s), which became known as Parsons Paris.

In 1980, Parsons expanded its Paris program, entering into an educational partnership with the American College in Paris (now American University in Paris), to offer Bachelor of Fine Arts and study-abroad options. Beginning in 1986, students matriculating in the Parsons Paris program were eligible to receive a degree from Parsons School of Design. In 2008, the contract between Parsons School of Design and Parsons Paris expired, and following a ruling by the International Chamber of Commerce in favour of Parsons, the Parsons name was dropped in 2010. That institution, now called the Paris College of Art, is no longer affiliated with The New School or Parsons.

=== The new campus ===
In 2012, the president of The New School, David E. Van Zandt, announced that Parsons School of Design was opening a new academic center in Paris in the fall of 2013. Its primary academic building is on Rue Saint-Roch in the 1st arrondissement of Paris.

In 2019, Parsons Paris announced plans for opening a site at the Fondation FIMINCO visual arts complex in Romainville in 2020, adding to its main venue in central Paris. Students will divide their time between the two locations.

== Notable alumni ==
- Count Nikolai von Bismarck, German nobleman and photographer
- Claire Keane, Visual development artist and illustrator
- Irina Fedotova, Russian model, artist and fashion designer
- Tadzio Koelb, novelist
- Claudia Poh, fashion designer
