= University Center (The New School) =

Building in New York City

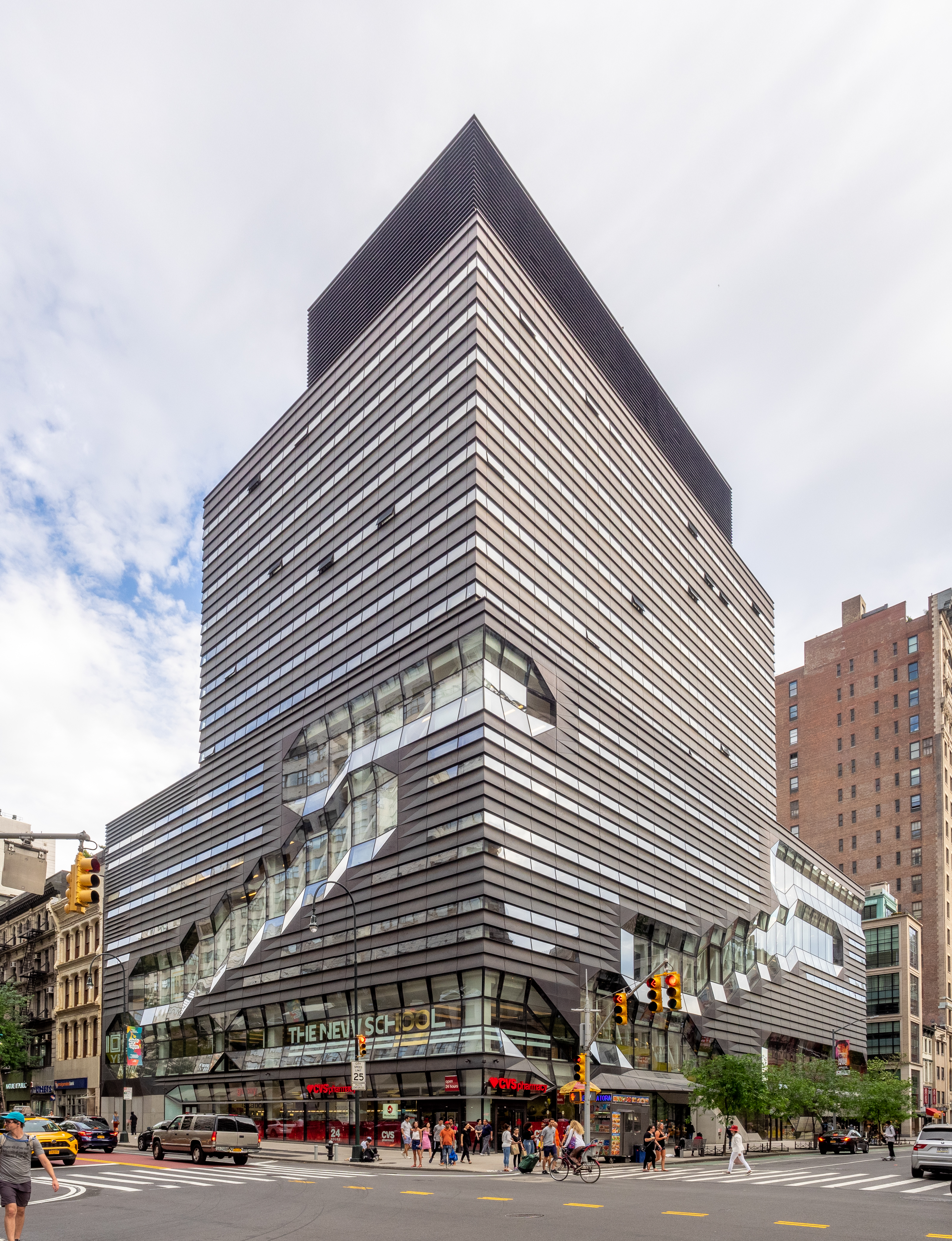
- The New School University Center at 14th Street and Fifth Avenue
- Interactive map of the University Center area

General information
- Location: 63 Fifth Avenue, New York City (Greenwich Village, Manhattan), New York 10003, United States
- Coordinates: 40°44′08.0″N 73°59′37.7″W
- Construction started: August 2010; 15 years ago
- Opened: January 2014; 12 years ago
- Owner: The New School

Technical details
- Floor count: 16
- Floor area: 375,000 square feet (34,800 m^{2})

Design and construction
- Architect: Roger Duffy of Skidmore, Owings & Merrill

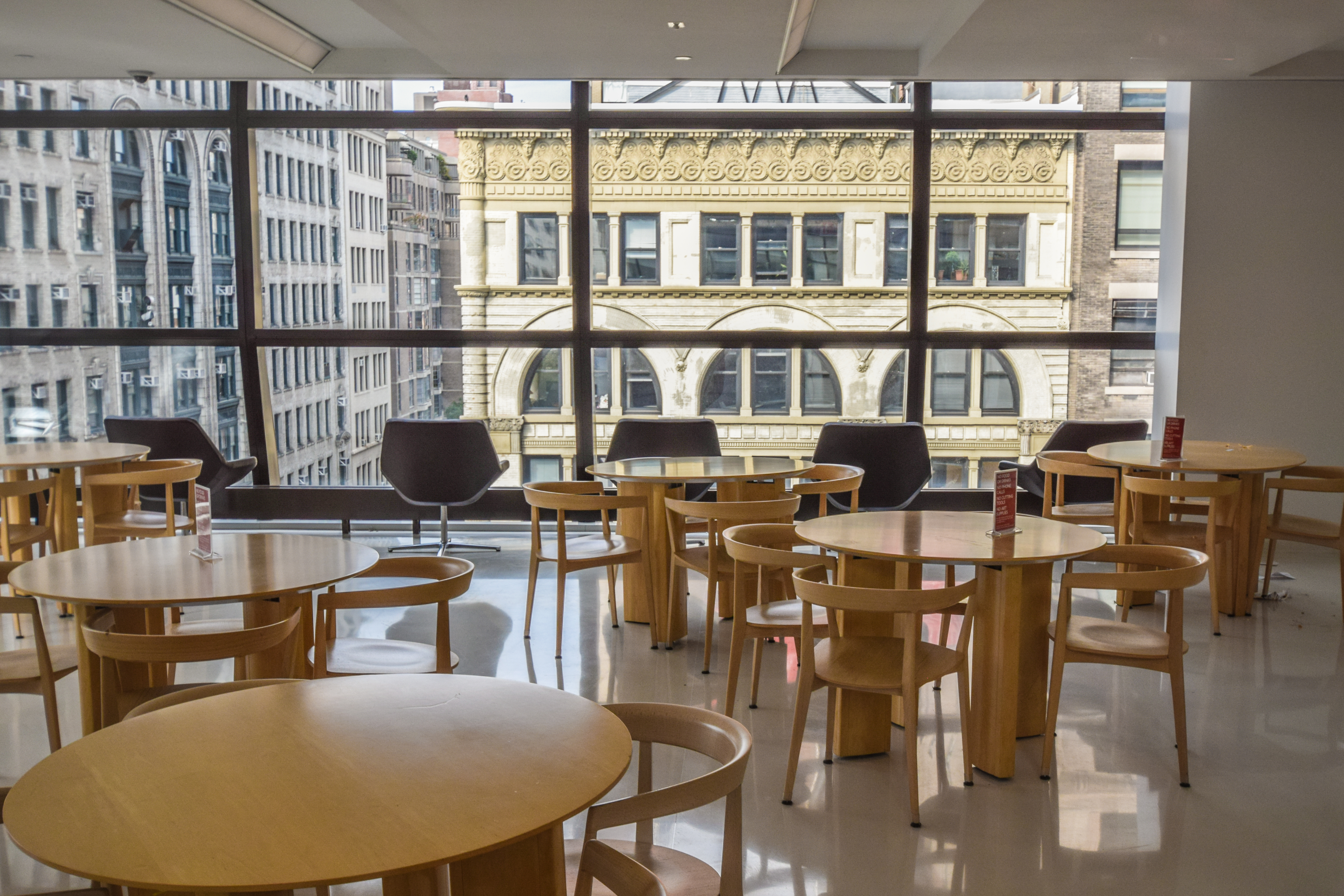
The interior of the library

The University Center is a major building that is part of The New School in Manhattan, New York City.

== History ==
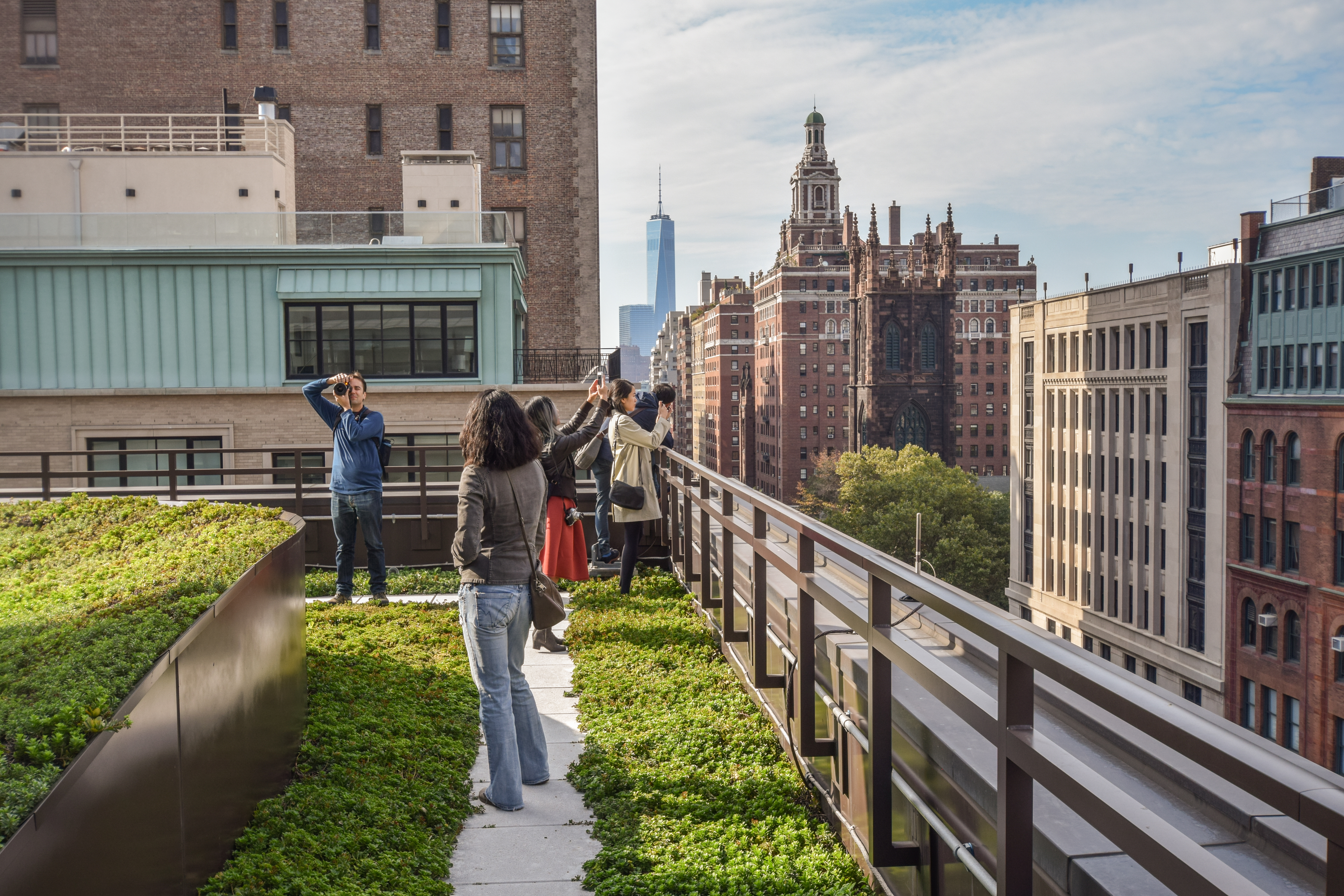
The building's rooftop

The 16-story building at 65 5th Avenue was officially opened in January 2014 and certified as a LEED Gold building. The tower, was designed by Skidmore, Owings and Merrill's Roger Duffy and is the biggest capital project The New School University has ever undertaken.

The 65 Fifth Avenue plans were initially controversial among students and Village residents, which spurred a major student occupation in 2009 at the previous building on the site. After much back and forth with the community, the plans for the University Center were adjusted in response to major concerns. Since its erection, the building has been well-received. In a review of the building's final design, The New York Times architecture critic Nicolai Ouroussoff called the building "a celebration of the cosmopolitan city."
