= Fetterman =

Fetterman may refer to:

== People ==
- Adam Fetterman (born 1970), American attorney and politician from Florida
- I. P. Fetterman (1887–1924), American racecar driver
- John Fetterman (born 1969), American politician from Pennsylvania
- Gisele Barreto Fetterman (born 1982), American activist and nonprofit executive
- John Fetterman (reporter) (1920–1975), American journalist from Kentucky
- Kenneth Fetterman, American scammer
- William J. Fetterman (1833–1866), American army officer

== Places ==
- Fort Fetterman, wooden fort constructed in 1867 by the United States Army on the Great Plains frontier in the Dakota Territory
- Fetterman, West Virginia, an unincorporated community located in Taylor County, West Virginia

== Other ==
- Fetterman Fight, a battle during Red Cloud's War in 1866, between the Lakota, Cheyenne, and Arapaho Indians and the United States Army

== See also ==
- Lundy–Fetterman School of Business, American business school founded in 1983 and located in Buies Creek, North Carolina
- Terman (disambiguation)
