= Federal public defender =

Type of lawyer in the United States

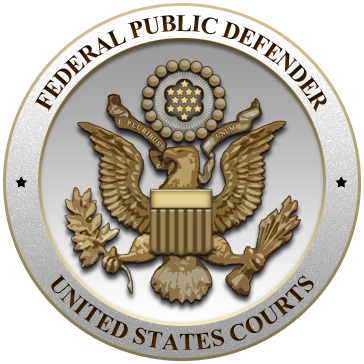
Federal Public Defender, U.S. Courts

In the United States, federal public defender organizations are entities in the United States Courts System within the federal government. Federal public defenders handle criminal trials in United States federal courts for alleged federal crimes or criminal cases involving state law violations in which a federal court can assert federal jurisdiction.

== History ==
The Sixth Amendment to the United States Constitution as interpreted by the United States Supreme Court guarantees a criminal defendant the right to representation by an attorney in serious criminal prosecutions.

== Organization ==
There are two types of federal defender organizations: federal public defender organizations, whose staff are federal employees, and community defender organizations, which are incorporated as non-profit legal aid organizations. There are 83 authorized federal defender organizations. These organizations employ more than 4,200 lawyers, investigators, paralegals, and support personnel and serve 92 of the 94 federal judicial districts.

=== Chief federal public defender ===
The chief federal public defender is appointed to a four-year term by the United States courts of appeals of the circuit in which the defender organization is located. The United States Congress placed this appointment authority in the United States courts of appeals rather than with the United States district court in order to insulate federal public defenders from the involvement of the court before which the defender principally practices.

== Quality ==
In a 2011 survey, Richard Posner and Albert Yoon found that federal judges perceived federal public defenders as providing higher quality representation than either privately retained counsel or attorneys appointed under the Criminal Justice Act.

== Salaries ==
By law, lawyers employed by Federal Public Defender offices have salaries set to match those of lawyers in the U.S. Attorney's office. The combination of salary, benefits and support team tends to attract, and more importantly retain, highly qualified attorneys. Especially in more rural areas, where federal criminal work is considered well-paid, many federal defenders have risen up through the state systems before becoming federal defenders.

== Case load ==
In 2014, the United States Sentencing Commission reported that there were 75,998 federal criminal cases in which an offender was sentenced in United States federal court.

== Former federal public defenders ==
- Candace Jackson-Akiwumi
- Arenda Wright Allen
- John L. Badalamenti
- Jesus Bernal
- Richard F. Boulware
- James K. Bredar
- Beth Brinkmann
- Judy Clarke
- Frank Dunham Jr.
- Richard Federico
- Thomas Fleener
- Charles E. Fleming
- Mary Barzee Flores
- Arianna J. Freeman
- Mary French
- Gustavo Gelpí
- Ketanji Brown Jackson
- Jane Louise Kelly
- Larry Krasner
- Marina Marmolejo
- Rosemary Márquez
- Mary S. McElroy
- Raymond P. Moore
- Federico A. Moreno
- Thomas W. Murphy
- Alan J. Pfeuffer
- Edward C. Prado
- Mark Reichel
- L. Felipe Restrepo
- Veronica S. Rossman
- Esther Salas
- Jon Sands
- Leo T. Sorokin
- William L. Thomas
- John Van de Kamp
- Jeffrey L. Viken
- Ayelet Waldman
- Steven T. Wax
- James D. Whittemore
- Kathleen M. Williams
- Paula Xinis
- Frank R. Zapata
- Gerald Zerkin
