= Fesperman =

Fesperman is a surname. Notable people with the surname include:

- Dan Fesperman (born 1955), American reporter and author
- John T. Fesperman (1925–2001), American conductor, organist, and author

== See also ==
- Fetterman (disambiguation)
