= Mary French =

Mary French may refer to:

- Mary Billings French (1869–1951), American heiress and society figure
- Mary French Rockefeller (1910–1997), American heiress, socialite, and philanthropist
- Mary French (attorney), American attorney
- Mary French (netball) (1926–2016), English netball player, coach, umpire and administrator
- May French Sheldon (1847–1936), née Mary French, American author and explorer
- Mary Mel French (born 1938), United States Chief of Protocol
