= Gisele Barreto Fetterman =

Brazilian-American activist (born 1982)

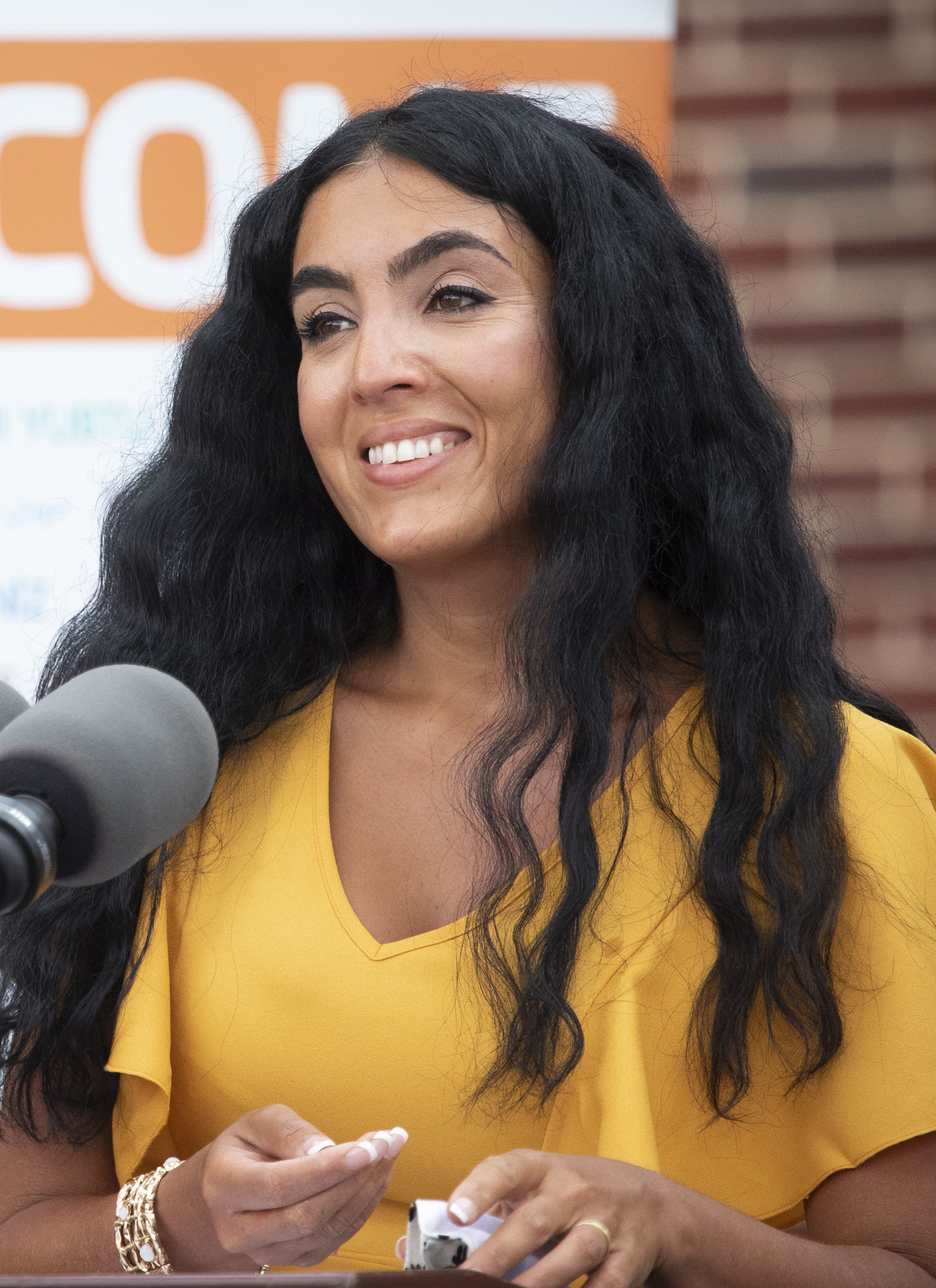
- Fetterman in 2020

Second Lady of Pennsylvania
- In role January 15, 2019 – January 3, 2023
- Lieutenant: John Fetterman
- Preceded by: Tonya Stack
- Succeeded by: Blayre Davis

Personal details
- Born: Gisele Barreto Almeida; February 27, 1982 (age 44) Rio de Janeiro, Brazil
- Party: Democratic
- Spouse: John Fetterman (m. 2008)
- Children: 3
- Education: Institute for Integrative Nutrition

Gisele Barreto Fetterman (née Barreto Almeida; (Note: This name uses Portuguese naming customs: the first or maternal family name is Barreto and the second or paternal family name is Almeida.) born February 27, 1982) is a Brazilian-born American activist and nonprofit executive. She is a founder of the non-profit Freestore 15104 and a co-founder of the non-profits For Good PGH and 412 Food Rescue. She is married to U.S. Senator John Fetterman of Pennsylvania. She was active in public life as the Second Lady of Pennsylvania during her husband's tenure as lieutenant governor.

== Early life ==
Fetterman was born in Rio de Janeiro, Brazil. When she was seven years old, she came to the United States as an undocumented immigrant with her mother and younger brother, taking up residence in a one-room apartment in New York City. They left Brazil due to violent crime in their community. In New York, the family lived in poverty, and furnished their apartment with furniture they found on the street. Fetterman said that her family often depended on food banks and thrift stores. Her mother, who has a PhD degree from a Brazilian university and had worked as a nutritionist and educator, took jobs cleaning hotels and houses, and was often denied pay due to her status as an undocumented immigrant.

Fetterman did not speak English when she arrived in the United States, and enrolled in an English as a second language program at her school in Queens. The family later moved to Newark, New Jersey. She studied at the Institute for Integrative Nutrition.

Fetterman received her green card in 2004 and became a citizen of the United States in 2009.

== Activism and public life ==
As first lady of Braddock, Pennsylvania, Fetterman founded the Braddock Free Store, a non-profit organization that provides local lower-income families with toys, diapers, baby formula, clothing, household items, and furniture. The organization serves close to 1,600 families per month. She started the Braddock Bench Project, focused on adding benches to local bus stops.

In 2015, Fetterman co-founded 412 Food Rescue, a non-profit organization focused on eliminating food insecurity and providing nutritional resources to families in need. The organization redistributed 2.5 million pounds of food in its first two years. She launched the Positive Parking Signs Project, a local initiative installing signs around local communities with sayings like "Follow Your Dreams" and "More Hugs Needed". Fetterman founded For Good PGH in 2017, a non-profit that advocates for diversity and inclusion, which brought the Free Store 15104 under its brand in 2019. For Good's largest initiative is The Hollander Project, a business incubator for women entrepreneurs.

She has pushed for the United States Congress to take "humane and compassionate" approaches to immigration, and petitioned that immigrant families should not be separated. She spoke in favor of the Deferred Action for Childhood Arrivals and criticized U.S. President Donald Trump for attempting to end the program. She also supports the legalization of marijuana in Pennsylvania and is a supporter of LGBTQ rights in the United States. She was named "Best Activist" by the Pittsburgh City Paper for her community involvement.

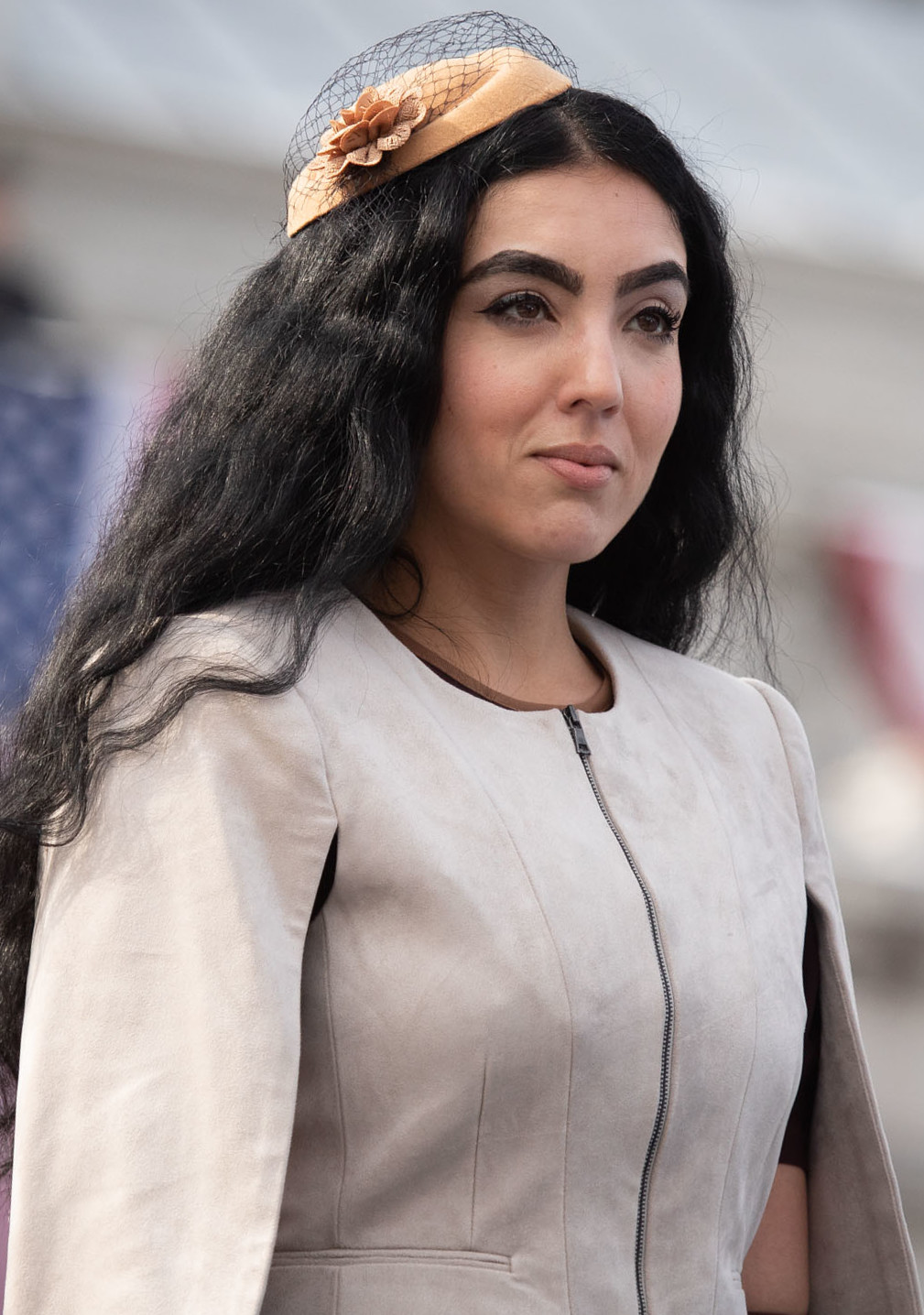
Fetterman in 2019

On June 20, 2018, she served as the emcee for World Refugee Day Pittsburgh. Earlier that month she spoke out about the killing of Antwon Rose Jr. Rose got out of the drive by shooter's car and ran from the police before being shot. According to Fetterman, Rose was "just a really lovely, gentle kid" and "really special" for volunteering at one of her nonprofits.

In 2019, Fetterman and her husband opened the pool at the lieutenant governor's mansion, located on Fort Indiantown Gap, to children who would not normally have access to one. The residence, on property owned by the Pennsylvania National Guard, is located about 25 miles (40 km) from Harrisburg, Pennsylvania. Fetterman, whose family has chosen not to live at the official residence, runs a program teaching water safety at the pool. She served as the host and honorary chairperson of the 2019 Hispanic Heritage Gala on September 28, 2019. The event, held at the Westin Convention Center Pittsburgh, raised money for the Pittsburgh Metropolitan Area Hispanic Chamber of Commerce's Foundation Educational Fund. On October 29, 2019, she was the first woman recipient of the Rodef Shalom Congregation's Pursuer of Peace Award.

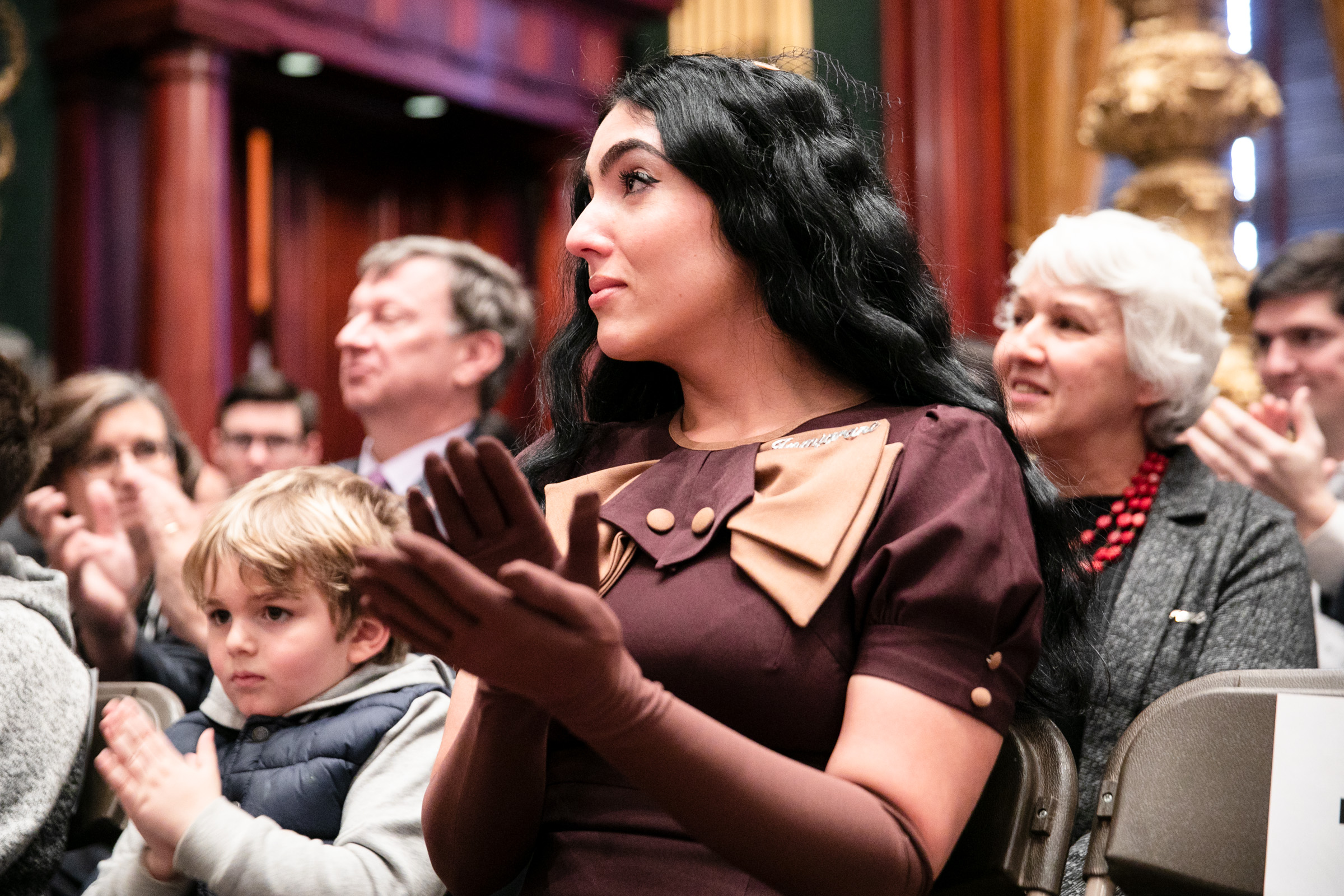
Fetterman at her husband's inauguration in 2019

In February 2020 Fetterman criticized the company Amazon for selling an anti-immigration bumper sticker with the text "Fuck Off, We're Full" written on the shape of the continental United States. The sticker was described on the company's website as an "Anti Immigrant Vinyl Car Bumper Window Sticker", and was a variant of a xenophobic slogan originating in Australia. She tweeted at Amazon, asking the company to reconsider the "power and influence" of their platform. Amazon responded on February 3, 2020, stating they would remove the sticker from their website. On March 6, 2020, Fetterman was a speaker at the Your Hour Her Power luncheon at the Westmoreland Club, held in honor of International Women's Day. She took part in the 2020 Census Tour, speaking at Pennsylvania State University about the importance of filling out the United States Census.

In April 2020, Fetterman spoke about the importance of social distancing, and the power of community engagement, during the COVID-19 pandemic in the United States. In September 2020, Fetterman helped organize a shopping-spree event for women first responders. Fetterman gave her husband's primary victory speech in May 2022 following his stroke.

In 2021, Fetterman was named by Carnegie Corporation of New York as an honoree of the Great Immigrants Award.

== Personal life ==
In 2007, Gisele met John Fetterman, then the mayor of Braddock, Pennsylvania, after writing him a letter inquiring about the town's role in the steel industry. They were married the following year. The Fettermans have three children and live in Braddock.

In August 2020, she spoke publicly about her use of medical marijuana to treat chronic back pain.

Fetterman made a cameo appearance in the 2022 film The Pale Blue Eye, which also had a cameo appearance by her husband.

== Notes ==
Honorary titles
Preceded by Tonya Stack	Second Lady of Pennsylvania; 2019–2023	Succeeded by Blayre Davis
