= Mary French (judge) =

American lawyer

Mary French is an administrative law judge with the United States Social Security Administration. For over twenty years, until 2009, she served as a federal public defender in the Eastern District of California. She attended the University of California, Davis, and graduated from the Cornell Law School.

Her clients and cases include Kenneth Fetterman, one of the first prosecutions for online auction fraud, which ironically set the record for the most expensive painting to be "sold" online to date. and Adrian Lamo.
