= 412 Food Rescue =

American nonprofit organization

- Formation: 2015
- Founder: Leah Lizarondo, Gisele Barreto Fetterman
- Founded at: Pittsburgh, Pennsylvania
- Type: 501(c)(3)
- Tax ID no.: 47-3476140
- Headquarters: 6140 Station Street, Pittsburgh, PA, 15206
- Staff: 41 (2025)
- Website: 412foodrescue.org

412 Food Rescue is a nonprofit organization based in Pittsburgh, Pennsylvania, US, dedicated to ending hunger by organizing volunteers to deliver surplus food to insecure communities instead of landfills. Since its creation in 2015, the organization has redistributed over 30 million pounds of food through the use of its mobile application, Food Rescue Hero. They are currently rolling out the app nationwide and in Canada.

== Food Reuse Strategy ==
412 Food Rescue is unique in that it relies primarily on the efforts of volunteers to transport and deliver the food immediately. Their food distribution model pairs one of its 450 donor organizations, often grocery stores and restaurants, with other nonprofit partners so that the food may be taken to individuals experiencing food insecurity.

Volunteers are notified of the pick-ups and deliveries to be made by the use of their Food Rescue Hero application. As such, 412 Food Rescue does not maintain an inventory or store food in warehouses. It obtains fresh and healthy produce which is immediately delivered by a volunteer to a non-profit organization which then distributes it to food insecure recipients.

== History ==
=== Beginnings ===
The organization was founded by Leah Lizarondo and Gisele Barreto Fetterman in March 2015. Lizarondo was inspired by the Free Store, a free clothing outlet in Braddock run by co-founder Fetterman. The Free Store gathers surplus goods and distributes them for free to those in need.

At the time of founding, food insecurity affected 14.2% of Pittsburgh. However, around 31% of food produced went straight to landfills. The two focused their efforts in solving both of these problems by developing a means to bring the food to those who need it. Initially, 412 Food Rescue used the social media platform Facebook to recruit volunteers to transport food between donors and recipients. The organization has grown and shifted from the social media platform to their own application.

=== Impact ===
412 Food Rescue has virtually eliminated emergency referrals, bringing them down from 5–7 a month to 0 on official reports. The organization has a 98 to 99 percent success rate with food pickups and deliveries. The organization helped furloughed federal employees during the 2019 government shutdown by setting up food distribution centers. Since the organization's inception in 2015, over 30 million pounds of food has been rescued and diverted to Pittsburghers experiencing food insecurity.

== Programs ==
=== Food Rescue Hero App ===
412 Food Rescue's reliance on the efforts of thousands of volunteers is made possible through an application launched by the organization in November 2016 called Food Rescue Hero, which is available in both the Google Play Store and the iTunes App Store. Over 7,000 people have downloaded and registered on the application.

A volunteer who is a registered user of the application will receive an alert whenever a prospective donor wishes to donate. Details, including the food, the quantity, and the distance is made available to the volunteer, who provides his or her own vehicle to pick-up the food and deliver it to the non-profit organization that receives it. The application's algorithm matches the available food to a suitable recipient.

=== FarmShare ===
The FarmShare program is a CSA that allows consumers to purchase a weekly share of locally grown produce, benefitting farms in the Pittsburgh area, as well as 412 Food Rescue.

=== Good Food Project ===
At the Good Food Project, bulk food donations are stabilized by volunteers into grocery bags of food and ready to eat meals to increase food access.

412 Food Rescue’s Good Food Project is located inside the Food & Energy Hub in Millvale. In this shared space, volunteers repackage surplus foods into heat-and-eat meals and grocery bags to be distributed to neighbors experiencing food insecurity.

=== University of Pittsburgh ===
At the University of Pittsburgh, the student-led club Food Recovery Heroes collect surplus food from campus dining locations, which 412 Food Rescue then distributes to local organizations. Together, they reduce food waste on campus and support the Pittsburgh community.

== Awards ==
The organization and its founders have gained widespread recognition for their efforts. Leah Lizarondo, the organization's CEO and co-founder has taken home many accolades including: 2018 Pittsburgh Smart 50 honoree and Impact award, Smart Business' Person to Watch 2017, Jekko's Pittsburgh Personality You Should Know 2016, and Pittsburgh City Paper's Pittsburghers of the Year. 412 Food Rescue won second place and $110,000 at the 2017 UpPrize, a social-innovation challenge. It was also recognized in the Pittsburgh Technology Council's Top 50 tech innovators in the region.
