= State House (Pennsylvania) =

Official residence of the Lieutenant Governor of Pennsylvania

Coordinates: 40.4252°N 76.5753°W

State House was the official residence of the lieutenant governor of Pennsylvania. The mansion is located on the grounds of Fort Indiantown Gap in Lebanon County, Pennsylvania. Originally a secondary Pennsylvania Governor's Residence, it was the only official residence of a lieutenant governor in the United States until it was transferred for other purposes in 2019.

== History ==
State House was built in the 1940s as a summer residence for the Governor of Pennsylvania on a wooded hillside on the grounds of the Pennsylvania National Guard's Fort Indiantown Gap. The three-story house is 2,400 square feet (220 m^{2}) and includes a five-car garage and a swimming pool. The first floor had a library, living room, formal dining room, powder room, and both a primary kitchen and a prep kitchen; while the second floor, and third floor attic, had a master bedroom and other bedrooms for children or servants. It is reached from a gated entrance off of Fisher Avenue in East Hanover Township.

The house was designated as the official residence of the Lieutenant Governor of Pennsylvania in 1971 and was under the control of the Pennsylvania Department of General Services; Ernest Kline was the first lieutenant governor to live there. It was the only official residence of a lieutenant governor in the United States, and cost the state government roughly $400,000 a year to maintain in 2017.

In 2019 Lieutenant Governor John Fetterman decided not to move into the residence upon being elected, instead choosing to open the grounds to the public. Fetterman's wife, Second Lady Gisele Barreto Fetterman, oversaw the management of pool use for swim classes, summer camps, and other public functions. On May 9, 2019 Joe Scarnati, a Republican state senator and former lieutenant governor, proposed legislation that would require the Department of General Services to sell the residence, with proceeds going towards affordable housing and assisting military veterans, since the residence was not being used. In December 2019, legislation passed in the state house and senate to instead transfer the property to the state Department of Military and Veterans Affairs (DMVA), which intended to use it in support of veterans' programs. By 2022, it was identified as "sold" on the state government's website, and reported in 2023 as having been given to the DMVA in 2019.

== See also ==
- Old Governor's Mansion (Frankfort, Kentucky): official residence of the Lt. Governor of Kentucky
- Hawkins-Hartness House, official office of the Lt. Governor of North Carolina
