= United States v. Grubbs =

- Supreme Court of the United States

Argued January 18, 2006 Decided March 21, 2006
- Full case name: United States, Petitioner v. Jeffrey Grubbs
- Docket no.: 04-1414
- Citations: 547 U.S. 90 (more) 126 S. Ct. 1494; 164 L. Ed. 2d 195; 2006 U.S. LEXIS 2496; 74 U.S.L.W. 4173; 31 A.L.R. Fed. 2d 635; 19 Fla. L. Weekly Fed. S 135

Case history
- Prior: Defendant's motion to suppress denied, E.D. Cal.; reversed, 377 F.3d 1072 (9th Cir.); opinion amended, rehearing denied, rehearing en banc denied, 389 F.3d 1306 (9th Cir. 2004); cert. granted, 126 S. Ct. 34 (2005)

Holding
- An anticipatory warrant is not defective under the Fourth Amendment when it fails to list the "triggering condition" necessary for its execution, because a warrant only needs to describe with particularity the place or person to be searched and the items to be seized.

Court membership
- Chief Justice John Roberts Associate Justices John P. Stevens · Antonin Scalia; Anthony Kennedy · David Souter; Clarence Thomas · Ruth Bader Ginsburg; Stephen Breyer · Samuel Alito

Case opinions
- Majority: Scalia, joined by Roberts, Kennedy, Thomas, Breyer; Stevens, Souter, Ginsburg (Parts I and II)
- Concurrence: Souter (in part), joined by Stevens, Ginsburg
- Alito took no part in the consideration or decision of the case.

Laws applied
- U.S. Const. amend. IV

United States v. Grubbs, 547 U.S. 90 (2006), was a case decided by the Supreme Court of the United States involving the constitutionality of "anticipatory" search warrants under the Fourth Amendment to the United States Constitution. The Court ruled that such warrants, which are issued in advance of a "triggering condition" that makes them executable, are constitutional and do not need to describe that condition on their face.

In this particular decision, which arose from a federal child pornography prosecution, the Court ruled that a warrant that was predicated on the undercover delivery of a videotape to the defendant's home, but did not state this on its face, was properly issued and executed because it described the place to be searched and the objects to be seized, and the search was conducted after the delivery was made. Evidence seized from the defendant's house from that search was therefore admissible in court against him.

== Background of the case ==
=== Criminal investigation ===
The defendant, Jeffrey Grubbs, became the subject of an undercover federal investigation and prosecution when he ordered a videotape containing child pornography from a website operated by an undercover U.S. postal inspector. The Postal Inspection Service then arranged a controlled delivery of the tape to Grubbs. An application was submitted to a magistrate judge for the Eastern District of California requesting an "anticipatory" search warrant, so-called because it is based upon the probable cause that at some time in the future (but not at present) certain evidence of a crime will be located at a specified place). An affidavit accompanying the warrant application stated as the "triggering condition" that the search warrant would not be executed until the tape had been delivered and taken into Grubbs' home. However, this condition was omitted from the issued warrant. Two days later, the undercover delivery occurred and Grubbs' house was searched after the tape was taken inside. The videotape and other items were seized, and Grubbs was arrested.

=== District Court and Court of Appeals proceedings ===
A grand jury for the Eastern District of California indicted Grubbs on one count of "receiving a visual depiction of a minor engaged in sexually explicit conduct." Grubbs' defense counsel, Mark Reichel moved to suppress the evidence seized during the search of his residence, arguing in part that the warrant was invalid because it failed to list the triggering condition and that the 4th Amendment requires officers to provide a copy of the search warrant to the homeowner when conducting a search. After an evidentiary hearing, the District Court denied the motion. Grubbs pleaded guilty, but reserved his right to appeal the denial of his motion to suppress.

The U.S. Court of Appeals for the Ninth Circuit reversed. Relying on Ninth Circuit precedent, the court held that the Fourth Amendment's requirement that warrants describe with particularity the things, persons, or places to be searched fully applied to the triggering conditions necessary for an anticipatory search warrant. Because the postal inspectors failed to present the application affidavit—the only document in which the triggering conditions were listed—to Grubbs or his wife, the court ruled that the "warrant was...inoperative, and the search was illegal." The U.S. Supreme Court granted certiorari and reversed.

== Opinion of the Court ==
Justice Antonin Scalia delivered the opinion of the Court. The judgment was unanimous as to the eight members of the Court participating, as were the first two parts of Scalia's opinion that upheld the constitutionality of anticipatory warrants in general. The third and last part of the Court's opinion, which further ruled that anticipatory warrants were not required by the Fourth Amendment to state their triggering requirements on their face, was joined by four Justices; the remaining three concurred separately in an opinion by Justice David Souter.

=== Scalia's majority opinion ===
The defendant had argued that anticipatory warrants in general violated the Fourth Amendment's requirement that "no Warrants shall issue, but upon probable cause," because the anticipated probable cause does not exist at the time of the warrant's issuance. The Court first noted that the courts of appeals had unanimously rejected this argument. It asserted that all warrants are in a sense "anticipatory," because any search is only reasonable if there is probable cause for it when the search is conducted. "In the typical case where the police seek permission to search a house for an item they believe is already located there, the magistrate's determination that there is probable cause for the search amounts to a prediction that the item will still be there when the warrant is executed." The Court concluded that this makes anticipatory warrants no different in principle from ordinary warrants.

When the anticipatory warrant is predicated on a triggering condition, the Fourth Amendment requires that there is probable cause to believe that the triggering condition will occur, and that if it occurs, that there is a fair probability that the contraband will be found at the place to be searched. In this case, the warrant application satisfied both conditions, based on the delivery of the tape as the triggering condition.

Regarding the warrant's failure to describe that triggering condition, Scalia wrote in Part III of the Court's opinion that, contrary to the Ninth Circuit's ruling, the Fourth Amendment does not have a general "particularity requirement." Warrants must only describe with particularity "the place to be searched" and "the persons or things to be seized," and the Court stated that it had previously rejected attempts to expand that scope.

The defendant also argued that any "precondition to the valid exercise of executive power" must be identified on the face of the warrant. The Court denied that there was such a constitutional principle, especially considering that while a judge must find probable cause to issue a warrant, the warrant itself does not need to state the basis for the judge's finding. Finally, the defendant claimed that the omission of the triggering condition prevents the person whose property is being seized of being notified of the lawfulness of the search and seizure. However, the Court pointed out that there is no requirement that the property owner be shown the warrant prior to the search.

=== Souter's concurrence ===
Justice Souter wrote separately to "qualify some points" made in Part III of the Court's opinion. Though joining the majority in reversing the Ninth Circuit's decision, Souter wrote that the term "warrant" itself in the Fourth Amendment may be read to mean "a statement of authority that sets out the time at which (or in the case of anticipatory warrants, the condition on which) the authority begins." He stated that the majority's rule against requiring this condition may cause consequences of "constitutional significance," as when an officer who is ignorant of the triggering condition executes the warrant before the condition occurs; Souter wrote that the government should be held to the terms of the condition in that situation, despite the unconditionally framed warrant. Souter also stated that the interest a property owner has in being notified of the accurate terms of a search has yet to be determined.
