= Joshua Rosenthal =

American nutrition school founder

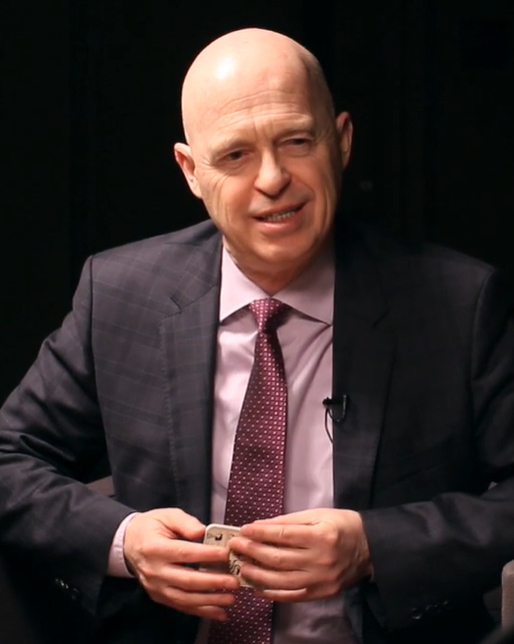
- Born: Toronto, Ontario, Canada
- Title: Founder and Director of Institute for Integrative Nutrition

Joshua Rosenthal is the founder and director of the Institute for Integrative Nutrition, a holistic nutrition school based in New York City.

== Education ==
Rosenthal was born in Toronto, Canada, and developed an early interest in nutrition and well-being. He earned a Master of Science degree in Education, with a specialization in Counseling, from Duquesne University. His educational background contributed to his later work in health coaching and curriculum development.

Rosenthal's approach to health was shaped by his studies in macrobiotics at the Kushi Institute under Michio Kushi, as well as his travels to India. These experiences introduced him to ideas related to whole foods nutrition, Ayurveda, yoga, and meditation, which contributed to his understanding of the mind-body connection.

== Integrative Nutrition ==
In 1992, Rosenthal founded the Institute for Integrative Nutrition (IIN), a program that offers a health coach training program. It began as a cooking class in a rented kitchen in NYC and has grown into the world's largest nutrition school. The school has more than 100,000 students in 123 countries and growing and students learn topics that range from holistic nutrition and coaching to business and marketing

Rosenthal is currently the director and primary instructor for the Institute for Integrative Nutrition, teaching alongside other nutrition and wellness experts, including Andrew Weil, Deepak Chopra and Barry Sears, among others. Rosenthal has more than 30 years of experience in curriculum development, personal coaching, and nutritional counseling. He speaks every year at IIN's annual conference at Lincoln Center in New York City.

Rosenthal coined the term primary food, which refers to anything that provides nourishment to a person's body. This includes relationships, career, physical activity, and spirituality. Secondary food is the food people eat. He also developed the term bio-individuality, which means a diet that works well for one person will not always benefit another. These theories, along with Rosenthal's concept creation of a health coach, are the result of his time studying macrobiotic diet at the Kushi Institute and exploring health education.

In 2006, Rosenthal lobbied the city of New York to be the first major U.S. city to ban trans fats.

In 2016, he worked closely with elected officials in Washington D.C. to declare a National Health Coach Week in January to generate awareness for health and wellness.

The Institute for Integrative Nutrition has received extensive criticism from Quackwatch on a variety of issues.

== Publications ==
Rosenthal authored books that include, Integrative Nutrition: Feed Your Hunger for Health and Happiness,” Integrative Nutrition: The Future of Nutrition, The Integrative Nutrition Cookbook: Simple recipes for health and happiness, and The Power of Primary Food: Nourishment Beyond The Plate.
