= Terman =

Terman may refer to:

== People ==
- Douglas Terman (1933–1999), American writer
- Frederick Terman (1900–1982), American professor and academic administrator
- Lewis Terman (1877–1956), American psychologist and author
- Michael Terman, American psychologist

== Places ==
- Terman, Iran, a village in Fars Province
- Terman Middle School in Palo Alto, California
