= Gerald Zerkin =

American lawyer from Virginia

- Born: Gerald Thomas Zerkin; March 1, 1949 (age 76)
- Education: Brandeis University (BA); University of Virginia (MA); Boston College (JD)
- Occupation: lawyer

Gerald Thomas Zerkin (born March 1, 1949) is an American lawyer. He is a senior assistant federal public defender in Richmond, Virginia.

== Career ==
Zerkin attended Brandeis University, where he received his bachelor's degree in 1971, University of Virginia where he received his master's degree in 1973, and Boston College, where he received his degree in Law in 1976. He began private practice in 1978, and began his work defending death row inmates in 1980, including Earl Washington. He has specialized in death penalty defense and civil rights. At their annual dinner in 1999, Virginians for Alternatives to the Death Penalty (VADP) awarded and praised him as an expert capital case litigator. In 2001, he joined the public defender's office.

Zerkin led the penalty phase defense, with Edward B. McMahon Jr., at the trial of Al Qaeda member Zacarias Moussaoui, which resulted in a life sentence.

Zerkin heads Zerkin & Associates.
