= John Fetterman =

American politician (born 1969)

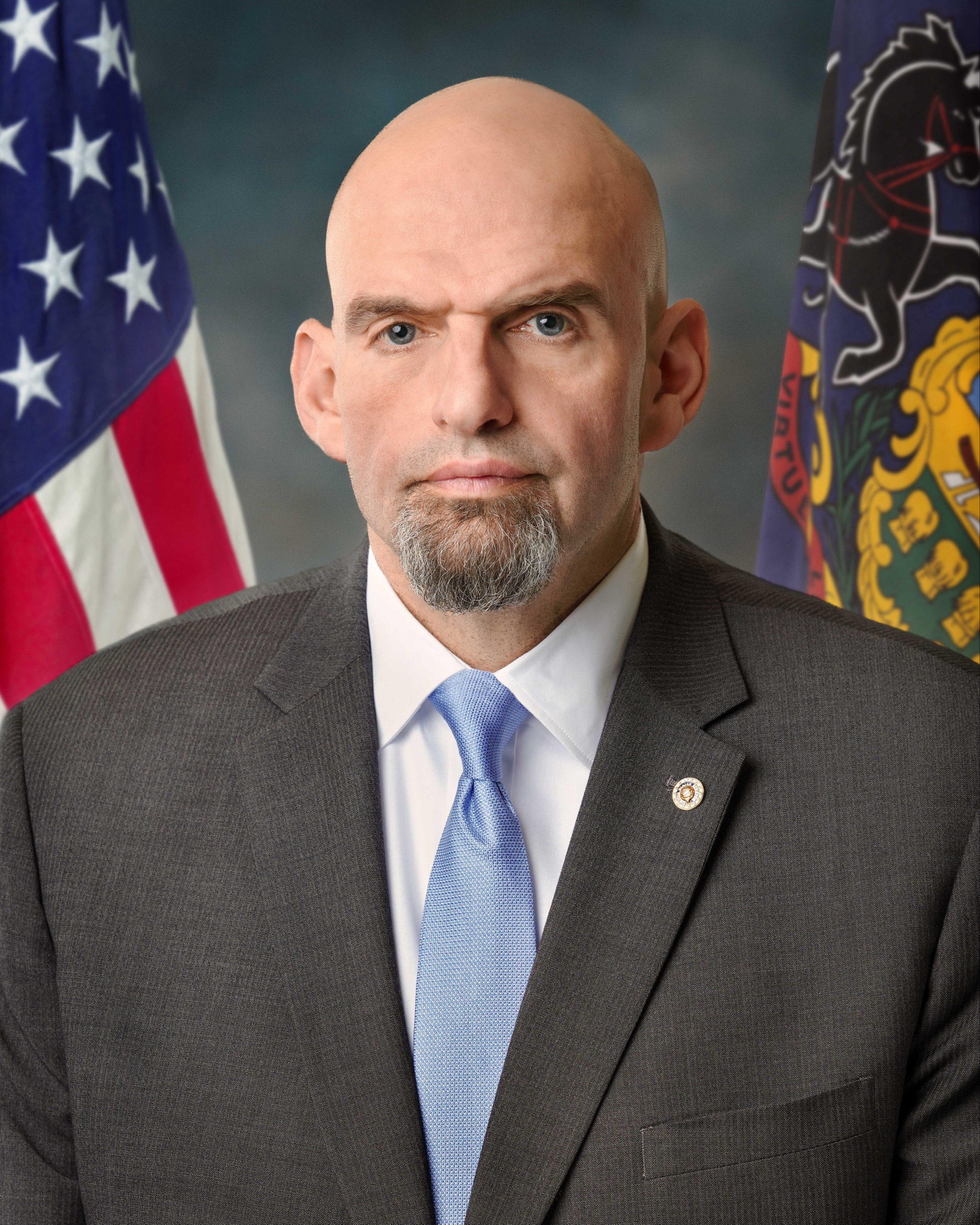
- Official portrait, 2023

United States Senator from Pennsylvania
- Incumbent
- Assumed office January 3, 2023 Serving with Dave McCormick
- Preceded by: Pat Toomey

34th Lieutenant Governor of Pennsylvania
- In office January 15, 2019 – January 3, 2023
- Governor: Tom Wolf
- Preceded by: Mike Stack
- Succeeded by: Kim Ward (acting)

Mayor of Braddock
- In office January 2, 2006 – January 8, 2019
- Preceded by: Pauline Abdullah
- Succeeded by: Chardaé Jones

Personal details
- Born: John Karl Fetterman; August 15, 1969 (age 57) West Reading, Pennsylvania, U.S.
- Party: Democratic
- Spouse: Gisele Barreto Almeida (m. 2008)
- Children: 3
- Education: Albright College (BA); University of Connecticut (MBA); Harvard University (MPP)
- Website: Senate website Campaign website
- Fetterman's voice Fetterman on SNAP and other nutrition programs Recorded February 16, 2023

John Karl Fetterman (/ˈfɛtərmən/ FET-ər-mən; born August 15, 1969) is an American politician serving as the senior United States senator from Pennsylvania, a seat he has held since 2023. A member of the Democratic Party, he served from 2006 to 2019 as the mayor of Braddock, Pennsylvania, and from 2019 to 2023 as the 34th lieutenant governor of Pennsylvania.

Fetterman studied finance at Albright College and earned an MBA from the University of Connecticut before beginning a professional career in the insurance industry. He went on to join AmeriCorps and earned an MPP from Harvard University. Fetterman's service with AmeriCorps led him to Braddock, where he moved in 2004 and was elected mayor the following year. As mayor, Fetterman sought to revitalize the former steel town through art and youth programs. In 2016, he ran for U.S. Senate, placing third in the Democratic primary.

In 2018, Fetterman was elected lieutenant governor on Governor Tom Wolf's ticket, having defeated incumbent lieutenant governor Mike Stack in a crowded Democratic primary. During his tenure, Fetterman received national attention for his efforts to legalize cannabis statewide, and for his opposition to President Donald Trump's false claims of election fraud in Pennsylvania.

After suffering a near-fatal stroke during the 2022 primary campaign that left him with some impairments, Fetterman was elected to the U.S. Senate, defeating Republican nominee Mehmet Oz with 51% of the vote. In 2025, Fetterman became Pennsylvania's senior senator when Bob Casey Jr. left office after losing reelection. Since he took office, Fetterman's policy positions have shifted significantly to the right, according to many observers. He has been accused of neglecting his everyday duties, isolating himself from his Democratic colleagues, and preferring to appear on conservative media. His health and his office's working environment have also received significant media scrutiny.

== Early life ==
Fetterman's ancestors were German-speaking Pennsylvania Dutch; they emigrated from Germany and settled in Pennsylvania in the 17th century.

John Karl Fetterman was born on August 15, 1969 at Reading Hospital in West Reading, Pennsylvania, to Karl and Susan Fetterman, both of whom were 19 years old. Eventually they moved to York, Pennsylvania, where Fetterman grew up and his father became a partner at an insurance firm. He grew up in an affluent suburb of York, and his parents were conservative Republicans.

Fetterman has said he had a privileged upbringing. He said he "sleepwalked" as a young adult while playing four years of football in college, intending eventually to take over ownership of his father's business. In 1991, Fetterman graduated from Albright College, also his father's alma mater, with a bachelor's in finance. He also received a Master of Business Administration (MBA) from the University of Connecticut (UConn) in 1993. For two years Fetterman worked in Pittsburgh as a risk-management underwriter for Chubb.

While Fetterman was studying at UConn, his best friend died in a car accident. Following the tragedy, Fetterman joined Big Brothers Big Sisters of America, pairing with an eight-year-old boy in New Haven, Connecticut, whose father had died from AIDS and whose mother was slowly dying from the disease. During his time as a mentor, Fetterman says he became "preoccupied with the concept of the random lottery of birth", and promised the boy's mother he would continue to look out for her son after she was gone.

Fetterman left Chubb in 1995 to join the recently founded AmeriCorps, and was sent to teach Pittsburgh students pursuing their GEDs. He later attended Harvard Kennedy School at Harvard University, graduating in 1999 with a Master of Public Policy degree. In 2001, Fetterman led the creation of the Braddock Out-of-School-Youth Program, helping local youth earn their GEDs. He moved to Braddock in 2004.

== Mayor of Braddock (2006–2019) ==
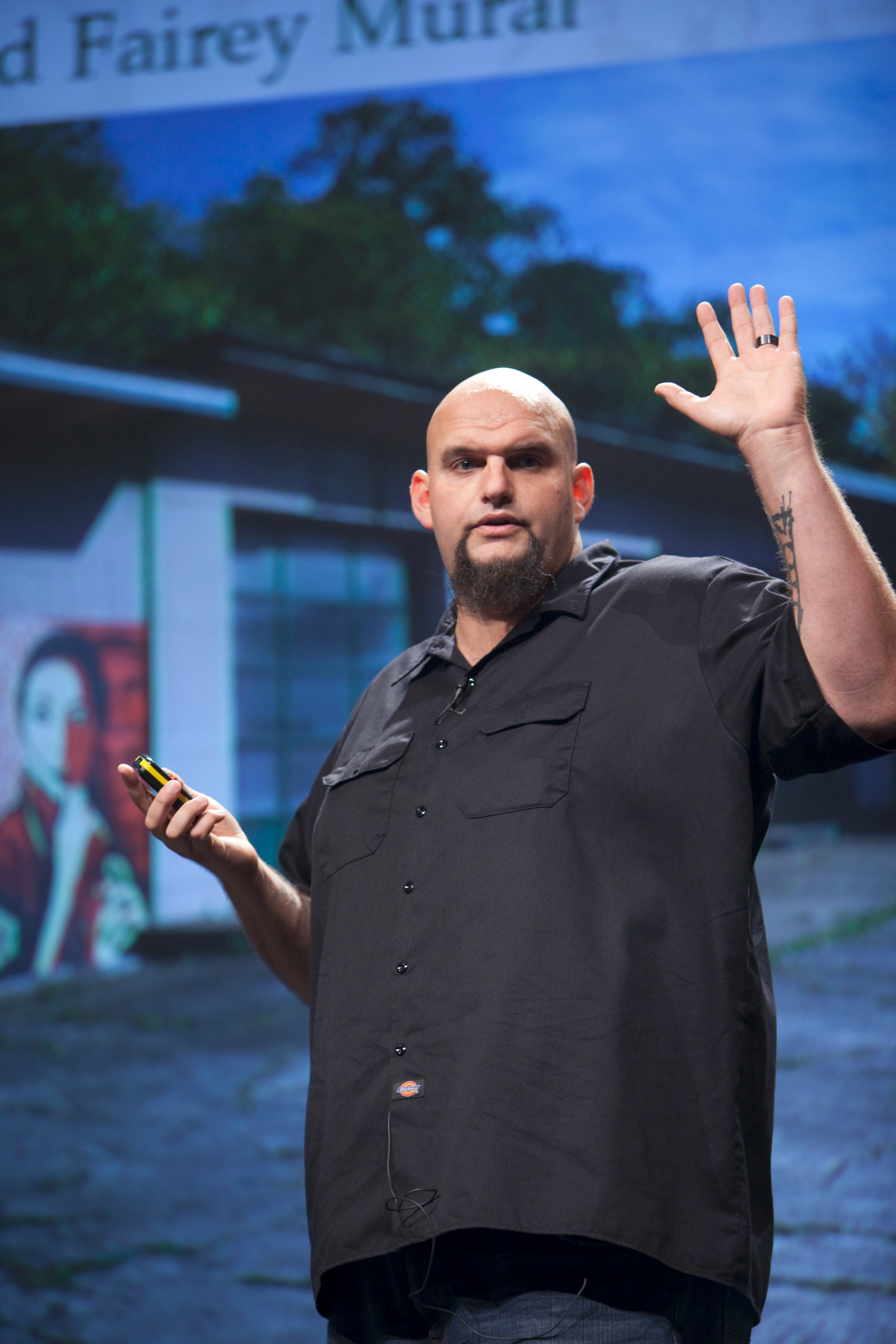
Fetterman in 2009

=== Elections ===
Fetterman ran for mayor of Braddock against the incumbent, Pauline Abdullah, in 2005. With backing from the town's young residents, he won the Democratic primary by a single vote. Fetterman won the general election; he did not face a Republican opponent.

In the 2009 Democratic primary for mayor of Braddock, Fetterman faced Jayme Cox. During the campaign, Cox attacked him for failing to build consensus with the town council. Cox also criticized Fetterman for abuse of power after Fetterman released non-public records that showed Cox was arrested in 2004. Braddock solicitor Lawrence Shields agreed that Fetterman's conduct constituted "an abuse of his mayoral authority" and violated the Pennsylvania Criminal History Record Information Act. Fetterman defeated Cox in the primary by a vote of 294 to 103 and was unopposed in the general election. Fetterman handily won the Democratic primaries in 2013 and 2017, and was unopposed in the general elections.

=== Tenure ===
Fetterman served as the part-time mayor of Braddock and the full-time director of the city's youth program. He also founded a nonprofit organization, Braddock Redux, which he used to acquire and save properties in Braddock. Fetterman's father helped subsidize Fetterman financially because the position of mayor paid only $150 per month. He received $54,000 from his father in 2015. Fetterman has several tattoos related to the Braddock community. On his left arm are the numbers 15104—Braddock's ZIP Code—and on the right are the dates of nine murders that occurred in the town while he was mayor.

After his first election, one of Fetterman's first acts was to set up a website for Braddock showing the town's mostly neglected and destroyed buildings. As mayor, Fetterman initiated youth and art programs and worked to develop the town's abandoned buildings and improve the poor economy. With family money, he purchased the town's First Presbyterian Church for $50,000 and lived in its basement for several months. The church was later turned into the town's community center. Fetterman later purchased an adjacent warehouse for $2,000, placed two shipping containers on the roof for extra living space, and moved in. He worked to convert vacant lots into parks and gardens, build the town's first public basketball court, and establish a two-acre organic urban farm, worked by teenagers of the Braddock Youth Project. To help fund programs, Fetterman established relationships with local nonprofit organizations, Allegheny County's economic development program, and then-county executive Dan Onorato. For example, Fetterman helped secure a $400,000 grant from the Heinz Foundation toward the building of a green roof, which provided 100 summer construction jobs for local youth.

Fetterman pitched Braddock to people around the country as a place to move due to the town's low real estate prices. The town has attracted people from cities such as Chicago and Portland, Oregon, drawn by the potential for growth. Inspired by Fetterman's call, a group of Brooklyn residents moved to Braddock and transformed an abandoned church into an art center. But Braddock's redevelopment raised concerns about gentrification. Despite Fetterman's attempts to attract new residents to Braddock, the population continued to hover around 2,000, and even though the town's real estate was cheap, many of the homes were condemned or uninhabitable.

Braddock mayors hold administrative power over the Braddock Police Department, but Fetterman delegated that power to Braddock Police Chief Frank DeBartolo for the sake of efficiency. Fetterman aimed to improve the relationship between Braddock's residents and the police by serving as a mediator during disputes. During his tenure as mayor, Braddock's homicide rate fell substantially; for five years, there were no gun-related murders in Braddock. In 2006, Fetterman opposed the expansion of Mon-Fayette Expressway, a partially completed four-lane highway that connects Western Pennsylvania and West Virginia. He argued that the planned expansion of the expressway would cut straight through Braddock and destroy the town.

While mayor, Fetterman had a contentious relationship with the town council and did not attend many council meetings. In 2009, members of the town council attempted to have him removed from a town council meeting and arrested after he criticized a political opponent while delivering his mayoral report. The same year, council president Jesse Brown ordered Braddock's code enforcement officer to cite Fetterman for an occupancy permit violation for a building owned by Fetterman's nonprofit. A judge later dismissed the complaint. To avoid the town council's gridlock, Fetterman used his nonprofit to accomplish many of his ideas for Braddock; this approach limited citizens' input into the projects.

In November 2010, Fetterman was arrested and immediately released after refusing to leave the property of the U.S. Steel Tower in Pittsburgh while protesting the University of Pittsburgh Medical Center's controversial closure of Braddock Hospital. The Braddock Hospital was Braddock's largest employer, and its closure left the town without a healthcare provider. Also in November 2010, Fetterman took a leading role in trying to close down Club 804, a Braddock nightclub he described as a public nuisance after a shooting occurred there. Two years later, the club renamed itself "Club Elegance" and Fetterman unsuccessfully sought to have it shut down for violating Braddock's ordinance regarding acceptable locations for certain sexually oriented businesses.

Fetterman cast only one vote during his tenure as mayor. In 2012, he voted to help the borough council choose a president. Starting in 2013, Fetterman began defying a 1996 Pennsylvania law that banned same-sex marriage and began to marry LGBT couples inside his home. In 2013, Fetterman and celebrity chef Kevin Sousa established a restaurant in Braddock, something the town had lacked. He bought a 3,000-square-foot (280 m^{2}) former car dealership, intending to make it the site of the new restaurant. The restaurant was named Superior Motors. The restaurant opened in 2017, but closed in 2021 amid the COVID-19 pandemic. Mayor Chardaé Jones, Fetterman's successor, criticized the restaurant for closing after only a few years and having received a Paycheck Protection Program loan for $190,000 in 2020.

==== Shotgun incident ====
Fetterman was criticized for an incident in North Braddock in January 2013 when he heard a sound he thought was gunfire and followed an unarmed jogger, whom he detained with a shotgun. The jogger, Chris Miyares, a Black American, said that what Fetterman thought were gunshots were kids shooting bottle rockets. Fetterman said no debris had been found. Miyares claimed that Fetterman pointed the shotgun at his chest while he loaded the gun and then aimed the gun at his face. Fetterman denies that he pointed the gun at Miyares and said he only pointed the gun in a way to show that he was armed and that he "didn't even have a round chambered or the safety off". He said he believed he "did the right thing" and has not apologized. No charges were brought against either in connection with the incident, and Miyares never filed a formal complaint.

The incident gained new attention during Fetterman's Senate bid, with critics alleging a racial element to the incident. Fetterman's campaign denied allegations of racism, claiming that Miyares was wearing a black sweatsuit and mask, so Fetterman could not have identified his race or gender. Fetterman also added that Miyares was running in the direction of a school and that he made the decision to approach him with the firearm due to the then recent Sandy Hook Elementary School shooting. In 2021, Miyares wrote that Fetterman had "lied about everything" that happened during the incident, but that he had "done far more good than that one bad act" and "should not be defined by it", and that he hoped Fetterman would win the Senate race.

==== Media coverage and criticism ====
Fetterman's efforts to create youth-oriented programs, revitalize his town, and attract artists and other "creatives" to his community were featured in The New York Times. A 2009 article in The Guardian called him "America's coolest mayor". Fetterman appeared on the Colbert Report on February 25, 2009, discussing the economic difficulties Braddock faced due to a decreasing population, plummeting real estate values, and bankruptcy. He also questioned why funds from the American Recovery and Reinvestment Act of 2009 could not be used to support projects such as those in Braddock.

In 2010, Levi Strauss & Company donated money for Braddock's revitalization and featured the town in an advertising campaign and documentary produced by the Sundance Channel. During Fetterman's mayoral tenure, several Braddock residents, including the members of the town council, criticized him for his media appearances that emphasized what they saw as unflattering aspects of the town. Jesse Brown, Braddock's former town council president, said Fetterman "needs to tone down his rhetoric about the community and the bad shape the community is in and the devastation of the housing... If he feels that the community is bankrupt, then he needs to go somewhere where he'd like it." In 2018, Tony Buba, a Braddock-based filmmaker, said Fetterman was "this big presence, and everyone thinks he's John Wayne, [but it is] not that simple." Buba pointed out that while Fetterman was mayor, Braddock's population had stagnated, and while the average income had grown, it was still only $25,000 per household.

== Lieutenant Governor of Pennsylvania (2019–2023) ==
=== Elections ===
==== 2018 ====
On November 14, 2017, Fetterman announced that he would run for the Democratic nomination for lieutenant governor of Pennsylvania, challenging, among others, incumbent lieutenant governor Mike Stack. Stack was seen as a vulnerable incumbent after the Pennsylvania inspector general launched an investigation into Stack regarding allegations that he mistreated his staff and Pennsylvania state troopers. Fetterman was endorsed by Vermont senator Bernie Sanders, Pittsburgh mayor Bill Peduto and former Pennsylvania governor and Philadelphia mayor Ed Rendell. On May 15, Fetterman won the Democratic primary for lieutenant governor with 38% of the vote. He was a part of the Democratic ticket along with incumbent governor Tom Wolf. On November 6, 2018, Wolf and Fetterman defeated the Republican ticket of Scott Wagner and Jeff Bartos in the general election.

=== Tenure ===
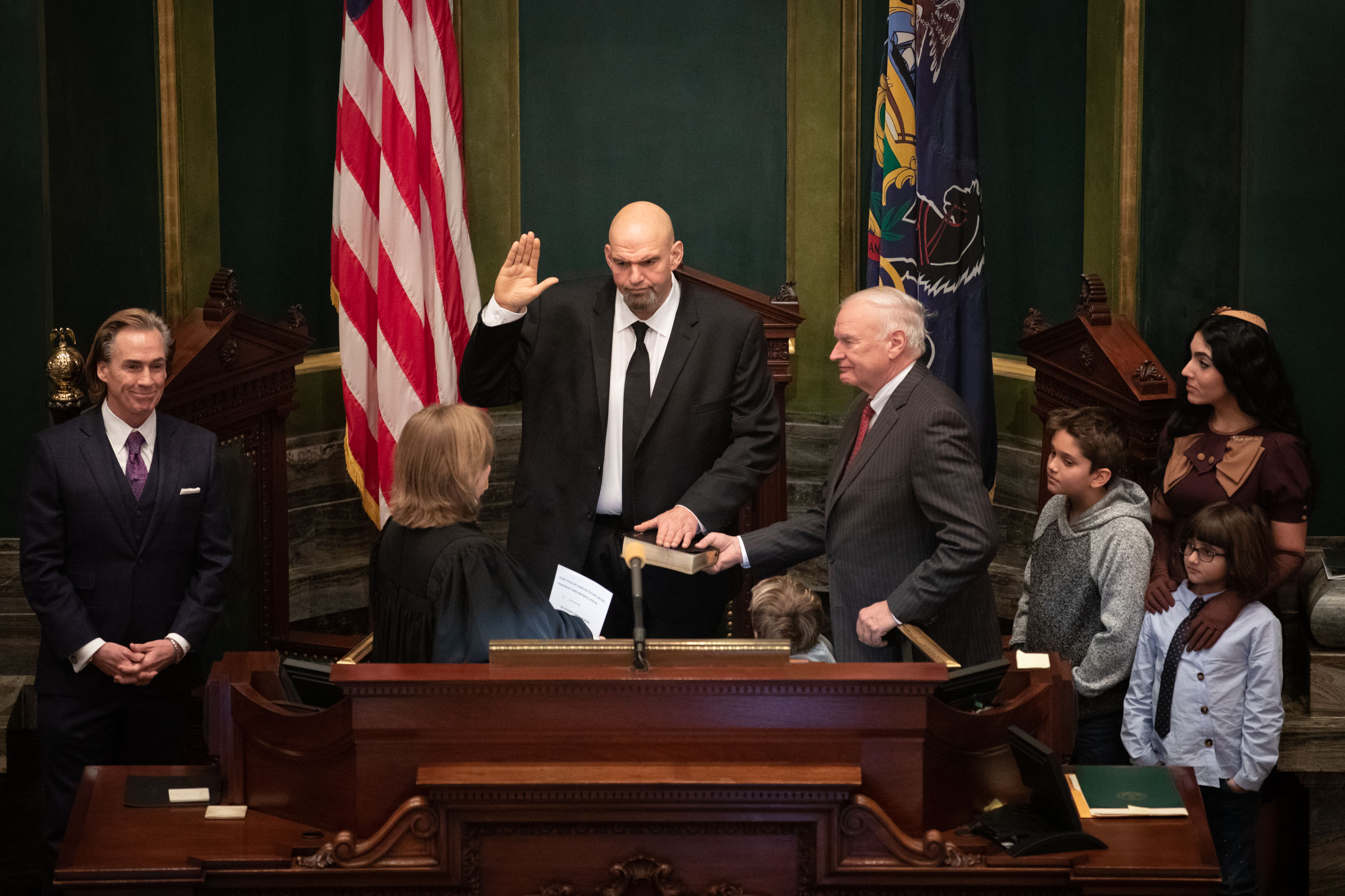
Fetterman being sworn in as Lieutenant Governor in 2019 in the Pennsylvania State Senate chamber.

Fetterman was sworn into office as the lieutenant governor of Pennsylvania on January 15, 2019, replacing Mike Stack. One of the first tasks Governor Tom Wolf gave him was to look into legalizing marijuana statewide. Fetterman went on a statewide tour, visiting all 67 Pennsylvania counties, and spoke to residents about legalization. After completing his tour, he published a report on his findings.

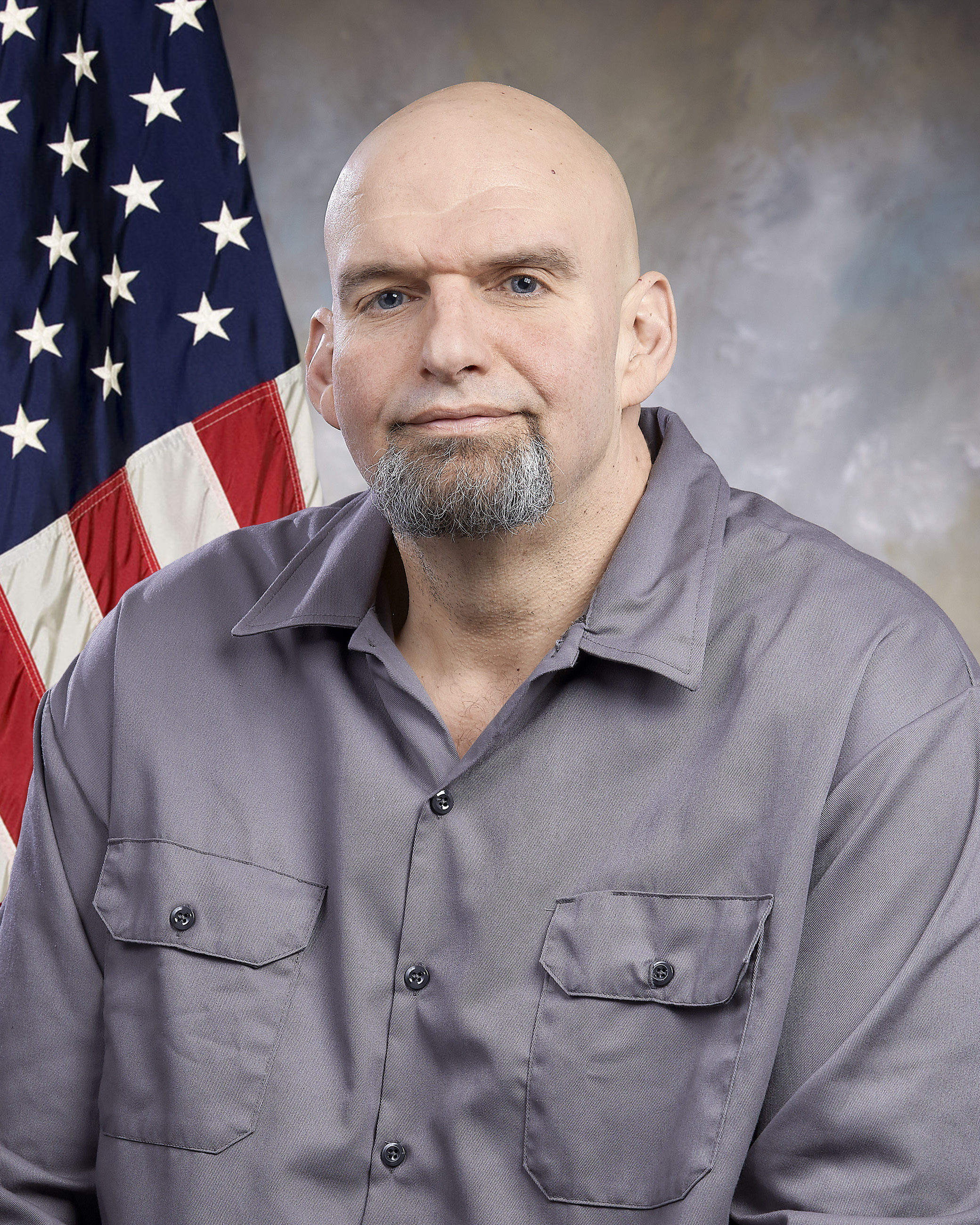
Official portrait, 2019

In a show of support for marijuana legalization and the LGBTQ+ community, Fetterman hung the pride flag and a flag with a marijuana leaf from his office's balcony, which overlooks the state capitol. State employees removed them when an omnibus bill, signed into law by Wolf, banned unauthorized flags on capitol property. Fetterman continued to defy the law by flying the flags outside his office.

An Associated Press review of Fetterman's daily schedule during his tenure as lieutenant governor found that he kept a light work schedule and was often absent from official state business. From his inauguration in January 2019 until May 2022, Fetterman's official schedule was blank for one-third of workdays. Additionally, the days that he worked were often short, ranging from four to five hours. He was often absent from presiding over the Pennsylvania State Senate, an official duty of the lieutenant governor. In 2020, he attended only half of the Senate's sessions; in 2021, he attended only a third of them.

==== Board of Pardons ====
The lieutenant governor has very little actual power, but does oversee the Pennsylvania Board of Pardons. In this position, Fetterman worked to increase commutations and pardons for those serving jail time in Pennsylvania. The Philadelphia Inquirer reported that Fetterman ran the Board of Pardons "with the heart of an activist and, at times, the force of a bully". The Inquirer also reported that he threatened to run against Attorney General Josh Shapiro (who, at the time, was planning a run for governor) unless Shapiro supported more pardons.

While chaired by Fetterman, the Board of Pardons recommended 50 commutations for life sentences, and Governor Wolf granted 47 commutations. As lieutenant governor, Fetterman announced "a coordinated effort for a one-time, large-scale pardoning project for people with select minor, nonviolent marijuana criminal convictions".

==== Donald Trump ====
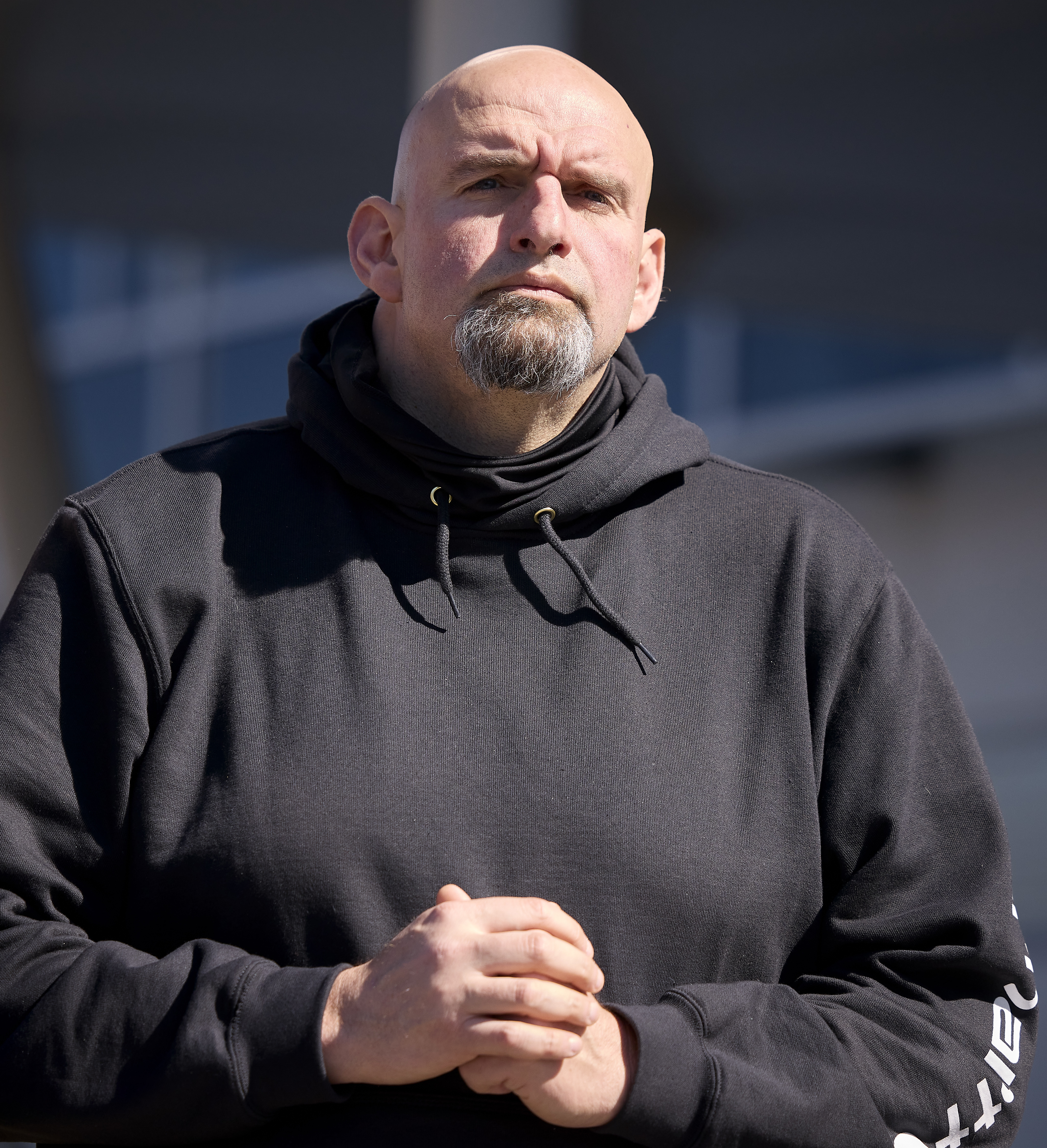
Fetterman as lieutenant governor in 2022

In the 2020 presidential campaign, Fetterman further boosted his profile as a savvy go-to Biden surrogate on national cable TV news shows and in his own swing state of Pennsylvania. In November 2020, Fetterman said Donald Trump was "no different than any other random internet troll" and that he "can sue a ham sandwich" in response to Trump threatening to file lawsuits in Pennsylvania alleging voter fraud in the 2020 presidential election.

Joe Biden won the 2020 presidential election in Pennsylvania, defeating Trump by less than 81,000 votes. Trump's false claims of voter fraud led to a challenge of the results, and Texas attorney general Ken Paxton filed suit to overturn the election results in Pennsylvania and other states. Supporting that effort, Texas Lieutenant Governor Dan Patrick offered a reward of $1,000,000 to anyone who could prove a case of fraud in the affected states. Fetterman responded by certifying that Pennsylvania had discovered three cases of voter fraud; two men had cast ballots as their dead mothers (both for Trump), and another had voted on behalf of his son as well as himself (also for Trump). Fetterman said that Patrick should pay $1 million for each of these cases. He said he was proud to announce that Trump "got 100% of the dead mother vote" in Pennsylvania. Fetterman's lampooning of the alleged voting fraud received nationwide publicity.

== U.S. Senate (2023–present) ==
=== Elections ===
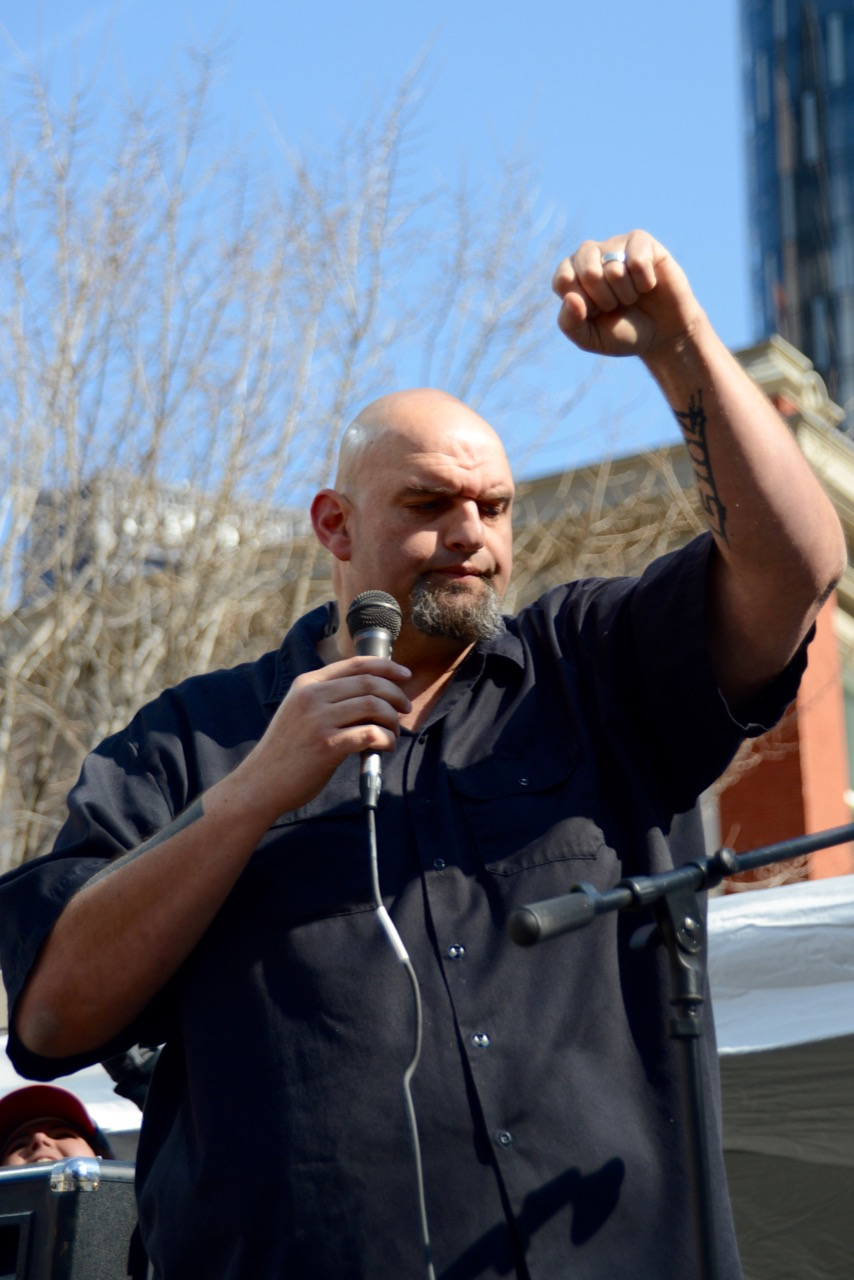
Fetterman campaigning in Pittsburgh in 2016

==== 2016 ====
On September 14, 2015, Fetterman announced his candidacy for the Democratic nomination for the U.S. Senate seat held by Pat Toomey in the 2016 election. His campaign was considered a long shot against two better-known candidates, Katie McGinty and Joe Sestak, the 2010 Democratic nominee for Senate. Fetterman was endorsed by former Maryland governor Martin O'Malley, former Pennsylvania treasurer Barbara Hafer, and the PennLive editorial board.

Fetterman's campaign focused on progressive values and building support through grassroots movement, drawing comparisons to Bernie Sanders. He was the only statewide Democratic candidate in Pennsylvania to endorse Sanders in the 2016 Democratic presidential primaries. He accused the party-endorsed Katie McGinty of taking campaign contributions from the oil and gas industry. Though lacking statewide name recognition, low on campaign funds, and polling as low as 4% a week before the primary, Fetterman garnered 20% of the primary vote. Katie McGinty, who spent $4,312,688 on the primary and was endorsed by Barack Obama and many U.S. senators, finished ahead of former congressman and admiral Joe Sestak, who raised $5,064,849, with Fetterman raising $798,981 and finishing third. After the primary, Fetterman campaigned on behalf of McGinty, who lost to Toomey in the general election.

==== 2022 ====
Fetterman's 2022 U.S. Senate campaign logo

In January 2021, Fetterman announced he was launching an exploratory committee for the 2022 U.S. Senate election in Pennsylvania. On February 4, 2021, Fetterman filed a statement of candidacy with the Federal Election Commission declaring his intention to run for the Senate seat being vacated by Toomey. On February 8, 2021, he officially entered the race.

Fetterman's main opponent in the Democratic primary was U.S. representative Conor Lamb. A political action committee supporting Lamb ran ads attacking Fetterman as "a self-described democratic socialist". While the ad cited an NPR article that called Fetterman a socialist, The Philadelphia Inquirer wrote, "Fetterman has never actually described himself that way." Both Lamb and another candidate, Malcolm Kenyatta, criticized Fetterman for an incident where he pulled a loaded shotgun on a black jogger whom he believed had fired a gun.

While leading in many polls, Fetterman received few endorsements in the Democratic primary. State representative John I. Kane said that the lack of endorsements was characteristic of Fetterman's "lone wolf personality". Darisha Parker, a state representative from Philadelphia, argued that his lack of endorsements was because he had "never come and introduced himself to me or any of my colleagues... if a lieutenant governor doesn't take the time to get to talk to somebody like me, then why would we want to send somebody like him to D.C.?" Fetterman vowed that he "will NOT be a Joe Manchin or Kyrsten Sinema-type Senator".

Fetterman won the Democratic primary by a landslide with 58.7% of the vote to Lamb's 26.3%. He won every county including Philadelphia County, but struggled to win much of the city's black vote—capturing just 18% of the vote in the majority-black precincts. Fetterman's wife Gisele gave a victory speech on her husband's behalf, as he was hospitalized following a stroke.

In the general election, Fetterman faced Republican nominee Mehmet Oz, a celebrity television doctor. According to The Philadelphia Citizen, Fetterman employed a social media campaign strategy consisting of shitposting and internet memes. The Daily Beast reported that Oz's New Jersey residency, net worth, and connections to Trump were the focus of many of the memes. Criticizing Oz's previous residency in New Jersey became a particular hallmark of Fetterman's campaign, seeking to label Oz a carpetbagger. Efforts by the campaign to highlight Oz's New Jersey ties included enlisting New Jersey celebrities Snooki and Steven Van Zandt to record video messages aimed at Oz, and having a plane banner fly over the Jersey Shore reading, "Hey Dr. Oz: Welcome home to N.J.! ❤️ John." Fetterman's health was also a major issue in the campaign because he had suffered a stroke days before his primary victory.

At an August 2022 rally in Erie, Fetterman appeared in public for the first time since recovering from his stroke; according to Politico, he "appeared physically healthy and mostly talked without any issues. At times, however, his speech was somewhat halted." In October 2022, he gave his first in-person interview since the stroke, with Dasha Burns, on NBC Nightly News with Lester Holt. As a result of his stroke, Fetterman required closed-captioning technology to read the questions as they were being asked out loud. Burns said that in their uncaptioned conversation before the interview, she was uncertain whether he could understand her. This drew criticism from other reporters, who said Fetterman did not exhibit such difficulty in other interviews.

In September 2022, Oz called on Fetterman to debate him before early voting began in Pennsylvania on September 19. Fetterman agreed to debate Oz in "the middle to end of October" but did not commit to an exact date or to a debate in September. Oz and Toomey criticized Fetterman's approach to the debate. The Washington Post wrote that it "raised questions about whether [Fetterman], still recovering from a serious stroke, is fit to serve in the Senate". On September 15, Oz and Fetterman agreed to a single debate on October 25.

Politico reported that Fetterman struggled during the debate "to effectively communicate—missing words, pausing awkwardly and speaking haltingly", while The New York Times reported that "he was also fluent enough over the course of the hour to present his Democratic vision for a state that could determine control of the Senate". According to the Times, Fetterman was an uneven debater even before his stroke. Republicans seized on his appearances and behavior after the stroke to suggest that he was not fit for office; according to medical experts, speech impairment after a stroke does not indicate cognitive impairment. Senator Chris Coons said that the debate "was hard to watch" but that Pennsylvanians would still be attracted to Fetterman's candidacy because of his "record of what he's done in Braddock [and] as lieutenant governor". Although Fetterman led most pre-election polls, his debate performance and concerns about his health helped Oz take a narrow lead before the election. On November 9, media outlets projected Fetterman as the winner of the election. Fetterman won the election with 51.3% of the vote to Oz's 46.3%.

=== Tenure ===
Fetterman took office on January 3, 2023. At 6 feet 8 inches (2.03 m), he is the tallest currently serving senator. According to The New York Times, Fetterman's adjustment to the Senate was "extraordinarily challenging—even with the accommodations that have been made to help him adapt". To assist with Fetterman's stroke-related speech processing issues, the Senate chamber was outfitted with closed captioning technology at his desk and the front of the chamber. In February 2023, Fetterman attended his first Agriculture Committee hearing. He asked questions about trade and organic farming, but stumbled slightly over his words.

Fetterman was hospitalized for syncope (lightheadedness) for two days beginning on February 10, 2023. Two days after his release he was hospitalized again, for a severe case of major depression. For about two months, Fetterman lived and worked at Walter Reed Army Medical Center. As part of his daily schedule at the hospital, his chief of staff arrived at 10 a.m. on weekdays with newspaper clips, statements for Fetterman to approve, and legislation to review. During his hospitalization, Fetterman co-sponsored a bipartisan rail safety bill, introduced after the derailment of a chemical-carrying train in East Palestine, Ohio, close to the border with Pennsylvania; the regulation aimed to strengthen freight-rail safety regulations to prevent future derailments.

On April 17, 2023, Fetterman returned to the Senate to chair the Senate Agriculture, Nutrition and Forestry subcommittee on food and nutrition, specialty crops, organics and research. The Washington Post said that Fetterman's "voice stumbled at times while reading from prepared notes" during the subcommittee hearing, but "he appeared in good spirits" and communicated a message about the importance of fighting hunger. Fetterman was among the five Senate Democrats who voted against final passage of the Fiscal Responsibility Act of 2023. He said his vote was motivated by the new SNAP requirements included in the deal, which raised the age of work requirements for able-bodied adults who do not live with any dependent children from under age 50 to under age 54.

In October 2023, after federal prosecutors accused New Jersey senator Bob Menendez of taking bribes, Fetterman was the first senator to call for him to be expelled. On November 5, 2024, Fetterman disrupted Jon Stewart's live election special on The Daily Show by canceling an interview 30 seconds before it was scheduled to air. After Trump won the 2024 United States presidential election, Fetterman expressed willingness to vote to confirm some of Trump's cabinet appointees, including Marco Rubio for Secretary of State, Pete Hegseth for Secretary of Defense, and Elise Stefanik for United States ambassador to the United Nations. He visited Trump's Mar-a-Lago complex and worked with Republicans on the Laken Riley Act. Fetterman was the only Democrat who voted to confirm Trump's nominee Pam Bondi as United States Attorney General. In December 2024, Fetterman asked Democrats to "chill out" after Trump won, saying, "If you're rooting against the president, you are rooting against the nation, and I'm not ever going to be where I want a president to fail. So country first."

Fetterman expressed hesitation to condemn Trump's pardons of January 6 rioters, saying, "some people are very deserving of a second chance and get a pardon". He called on New York governor Kathy Hochul to pardon Trump in his New York hush money case, which he said was politically motivated "bullshit" and compared to the Hunter Biden case. There were rumors that he might become a Republican or an independent, which Fetterman called "amateur-hour shit". Trump has since praised Fetterman as "a fascinating man".

Since Trump's November victory, Fetterman has become a harsh critic of his own party, calling its brand "toxic", and has indicated that he is receptive to some Trump administration policies. Fetterman's stronger polling among Republican voters and work with Republican politicians has fueled speculation that Fetterman would switch parties. Despite encouragement from Republican figures, including Trump, Fetterman has repeatedly denied any intention to switch parties in interviews and in a Washington Post op-ed, citing his Democratic-leaning voting record and stances on issues such as LGTBQ+ rights, abortion, and labor.

Fetterman supported Trump's decision to pull $400 million in federal funding from Columbia University over a perceived failure to crack down on pro-Palestinian protests that the Trump administration characterized as antisemitic. He has also supported Trump's crackdown on college student protesters. He has hosted no town-hall-style events since Trump's inauguration. Fetterman has criticized the support of some Senate Democrats for Mahmoud Khalil over his opposition to the Gaza war, calling Columbia "kind of ground zero of that monoculture run amok [where the university administration] allowed antisemitism to take over".

By March 2025, Fetterman had missed more roll-call votes than any other U.S. senator for the year: 18.4%. Eleven of his then 18 missed votes were on Thursdays. He had missed the fourth-most votes—over 21%—in the previous session of Congress. Fetterman explained that on Thursdays he often checked in with his father, who was recovering from a heart attack, and preferred spending Mondays with his children instead of attending procedural votes. He also criticized hearings as largely a waste of time for low-seniority senators, quit the Democratic Caucus group chat, and does not attend its weekly lunch.

In September 2026, The Wall Street Journal reported that Fetterman had lost interest in many of the duties of being senator, writing that he "shows little interest in doing the job beyond cultivating relationships with conservative media figures and advocating for Israel." A group of disabled veterans who traveled to Washington, D.C. to discuss health care with Fetterman were told that Fetterman was too ill to meet with them; less than an hour later, Fetterman appeared in his office and said he was scheduled to appear on Fox News to discuss Israel. Fetterman privately expressed disinterest in meeting with officials from the Children's Hospital of Philadelphia to discuss Medicaid cuts. When an aide texted him that these officials were "worried about vaccines and Medicaid cuts", Fetterman replied, "Well I'm not." Fetterman declined to attend the joint funerals of three police officers killed in York, Pennsylvania, complaining to a staff member that the funeral schedule was too long. When State Senator Anthony Hardy Williams brought a busload of constituents to Washington, D.C. to meet with Pennsylvania legislators, Fetterman was the only one who declined to meet with them. Williams said Fetterman "was available. He just chose not to meet with us." The Wall Street Journal reported that Fetterman was displeased with Chuck Schumer for failing to give him a seat on the Senate Foreign Relations Committee. In September 2026, former Fetterman staffers created an anonymous account on X and threatened to release additional allegations about his conduct in office. Fetterman called the allegations "lies, half-truths, innuendos, smears and anonymous" attacks from disgruntled former employees.

In September 2026, Fetterman's reelection campaign allegedly asked a few congressional Republicans for donations.

=== Committee assignments ===
- Committee on Agriculture, Nutrition, and Forestry
  - Subcommittee on Commodities, Risk Management, and Trade
  - Subcommittee on Food and Nutrition, Specialty Crops, Organics, and Research (chair)
- Committee on Banking, Housing, and Urban Affairs
  - Subcommittee on Economic Policy
  - Subcommittee on Financial Institutions and Consumer Protection
  - Subcommittee on Housing, Transportation, and Community Development
- Committee on Environment and Public Works
  - Subcommittee on Chemical Safety, Waste Management, Environmental Justice and Regulatory Oversight
  - Subcommittee on Transportation and Infrastructure
- Joint Economic Committee
- Special Committee on Aging

== Political positions ==
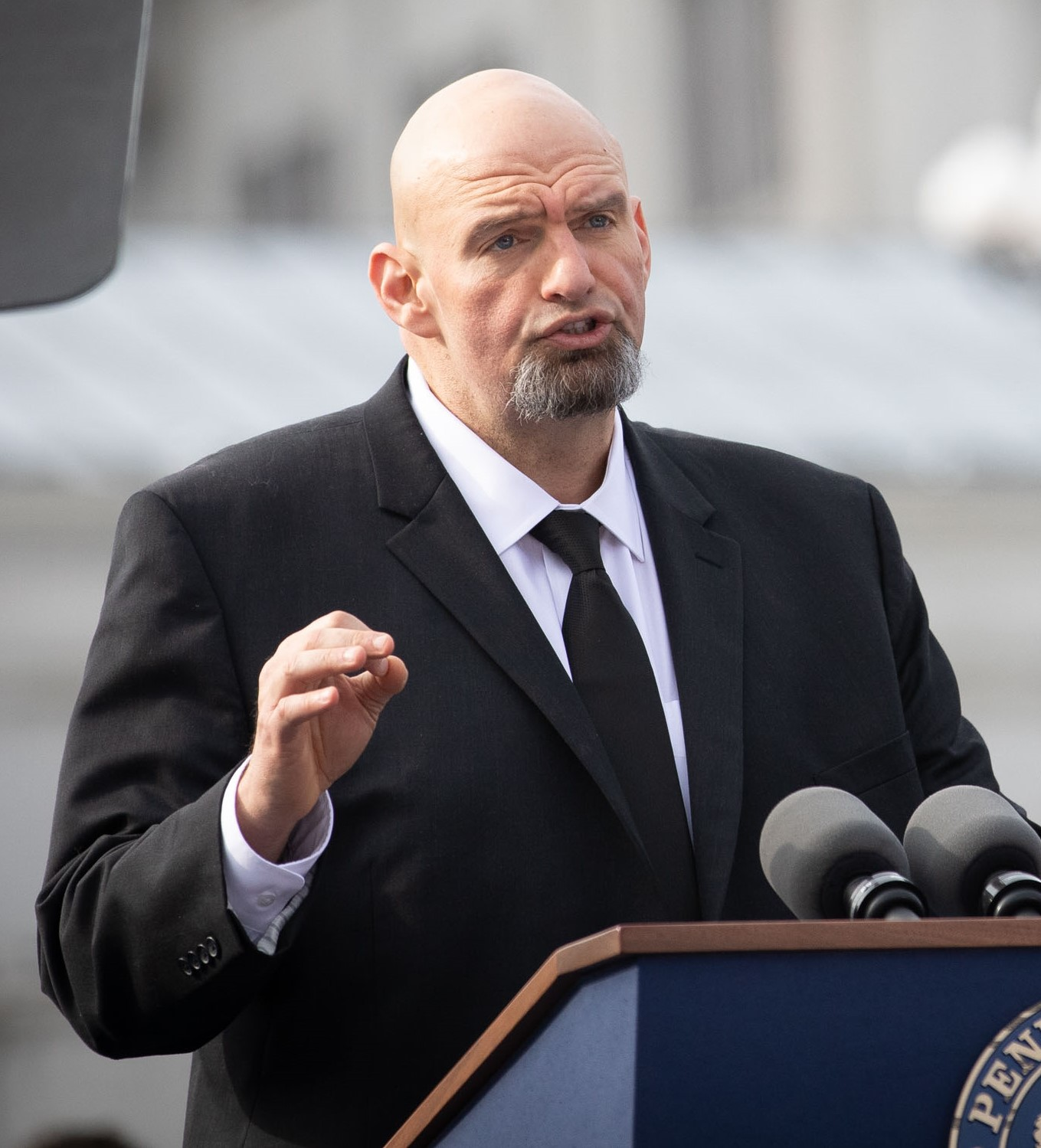
Fetterman delivering his inaugural address as lieutenant governor in 2019

Before running for the U.S. Senate, Fetterman was described as a social and fiscal progressive, including by himself, and was endorsed by Bernie Sanders. When running for Senate in 2022, Fetterman said he was not a progressive, "just a Democrat", saying that many parts of his platform that were once considered progressive are now mainstream beliefs of the party. In 2022, The New York Times characterized Fetterman as "left-leaning". Fordham University political science professor Christina Greer described Fetterman, alongside New York City Mayor Eric Adams, as "simultaneously progressive, moderate and conservative". After Fetterman rejected the progressive label again in 2023, NBC News called his ideology an "unorthodox brand of blue-collar liberalism, with a dash of outsider populism." In 2024, Fetterman said in an interview with Bill Maher that his stroke gave him the freedom to leave progressivism, and called it "very liberating".

In 2024, a number of commentators said that Fetterman's views on Israel had shifted to the right and were more in line with those of Republicans. By mid-2025, Fetterman had made a number of moves that were characterized as becoming closer to Trump while repeatedly criticizing Democrats. The New York Times reported that he had grown "more conservative, mostly on Israel, but also on a range of other issues." Trump has since praised Fetterman, calling him the "most sensible" Democratic senator, which Fetterman said made his Republican family "proud".

In a 2025 interview with the Financial Times, Fetterman said that progressives had won the 2024 election for Trump and are "intent" on doing it again, adding, "Some of the most extreme voices now are coming from the far-blue places that are removed from the real fight—and that's down in the important states that decide who's going to win the White House."

On September 9, 2026, Fetterman appeared in a short video at the opening of the 2026 Republican National Convention in Dallas. He said he was "always going to reject the extremes of socialism" and would "work with President Trump and defend the steel way of life".

=== Abortion ===
In a Democratic primary debate in May 2022, Fetterman said of abortion: "That is between a woman and her physician". To the question if any exceptions exist, he said: "It's certainly not between me or any politician. We settled this decades ago, and the fact that these states are trying to repeal it... we have to push back on that." Later that month, Fetterman reiterated his position opposing any legal restrictions on abortion, including in the third trimester.

=== Congressional stock ownership ===
Fetterman has expressed support for barring members of Congress and their immediate families from trading or holding stocks, though he has traded corporate bonds on his dependent children's behalf while in office.

=== Criminal justice reform ===
Prison reform is one of Fetterman's signature issues, advocating for more rehabilitation action as well as clemency for model prisoners. As part of his role as lieutenant governor, he served as the chair of Pennsylvania's Board of Pardons, which processes clemency requests and forwards them to the governor. Fetterman urged the board to process requests more quickly. Fetterman is in favor of abolishing capital punishment in Pennsylvania, having said he "wholly support[s] Governor Tom Wolf's moratorium on the death penalty". He has called the death penalty "inhumane, antiquated, expensive, and [a] flawed system of punishment".

Fetterman supports the elimination of mandatory sentences of life in prison without the possibility of parole for second degree murder, in which someone commits a felony resulting in death, but is not directly responsible for the killing. He does not support eliminating life without parole as a sentence. His Senate race opponent, Mehmet Oz, claimed that Fetterman supports "eliminat[ing] life sentences for murderers", which PolitiFact and other fact-checking outlets called a distortion of Fetterman's position.

=== Environmental issues ===
Fetterman has called for a balance between decarbonization efforts and creating fossil fuel industry jobs. He has a mixed record on fracking. He once called the practice "an environmental abomination." While running for lieutenant governor, Fetterman both supported establishing two new fracking wells and said he did not support fracking and never would. He later said that he supports permitting fracking but advocates stricter environmental regulations. In 2021, Fetterman said that he supports moving towards a "de facto moratorium [on fracking] because the transition is going to be toward green and renewable energy". In February 2021, he told MSNBC, "I'm embracing what the green ideal considers a priority... the Green New Deal isn't a specific piece of legislation. What I am in support of is acknowledging that the climate crisis is absolutely real."

=== Filibuster ===
Fetterman at first supported ending the filibuster in the United States Senate and said that Democrats needed to be more ruthless, like Republicans, in order to pass legislative priorities. But in July 2026 he published an op-ed in which he wrote that he had been "horribly wrong" and that the need to compromise the filibuster forces is "one of the best features of the Senate".

In March 2025, Fetterman was one of nine Senate Democrats to vote for cloture for a Republican-led stopgap funding bill to avoid a federal government shutdown. He criticized his fellow Democrats and said it was "absolutely absurd" to pander to "extreme voices" in the Democratic Party in the face of the ground reality of the Gaza war and Israel by shutting down the government rather than vote for the Republican funding bill.

=== Foreign policy ===
In 2015, The Patriot-News called Fetterman a non-interventionist. Fetterman said in 2015 that the U.S. should not "be considered the world's police officers".

==== China ====
When asked in 2022 what the greatest foreign threat to the U.S. is, Fetterman responded, "I believe China is not our friend." In 2023, he said that the Chinese government should not be allowed to own agricultural land in the U.S.

==== Greenland ====
In January 2025, Fetterman said he was open to Trump's proposed United States acquisition of Greenland, and later joked he wanted to be appointed "Pope of Greenland". He said it was a "responsible conversation", including "buying it out" like Alaska or the Louisiana Purchase.

==== Iran ====
In a 2015 interview, Fetterman said "We have to let the countries in the Middle East solve the Middle East problems".

In 2025, Fetterman took a hardline stance on Iran's nuclear program, telling The Washington Free Beacon, "Waste that shit", and calling for its destruction. He argued there is no negotiating with a regime that has destabilized the region for decades and said the U.S. has "an incredible window... to strike and destroy Iran's nuclear facilities." Fetterman added, "The negotiations should be comprised of 30,000-pound bombs and the IDF", and later tweeted that Iran's nuclear program's only purpose is to create weapons, urging full U.S. military support in assisting Israel to eliminate it.

Fetterman strongly supports U.S. intervention in the 2026 Iran war. He was the only Democratic senator to join all Republican senators, except Rand Paul, in voting against four separate resolutions offered in March and April 2026 aiming to reassert congressional authority over authorizing the use of military force, saying he was "baffled why so many are unwilling to support the only action to achieve" regime change in Iran. In response to Israeli threats to target the successors of the slain Supreme Leader Ali Khamenei, Fetterman recommended that the U.S. and Israel "just keep killing them until they're gone". He has said, "Every single thing Iran done and is is [sic] a war crime." Fetterman was the only Democratic senator to decline to sign a letter to Defense Secretary Hegseth calling for an investigation into the 2026 Minab school attack. On May 13, 2026, he was the only Senate Democrat to vote against a War Powers Resolution to curtail President Trump's war powers; the vote ended 49-50, blocking it for the seventh time since the start of the conflict.

On May 19, the Senate, with 50 votes in favor and 47 in opposition, advanced a war powers resolution that effectively forces the president to end the war against Iran unless Congress authorizes its continuation. With four Republicans crossing party lines to vote in favor of the resolution, Fetterman was again the sole Democrat to vote against it.

==== Israel–Palestine ====
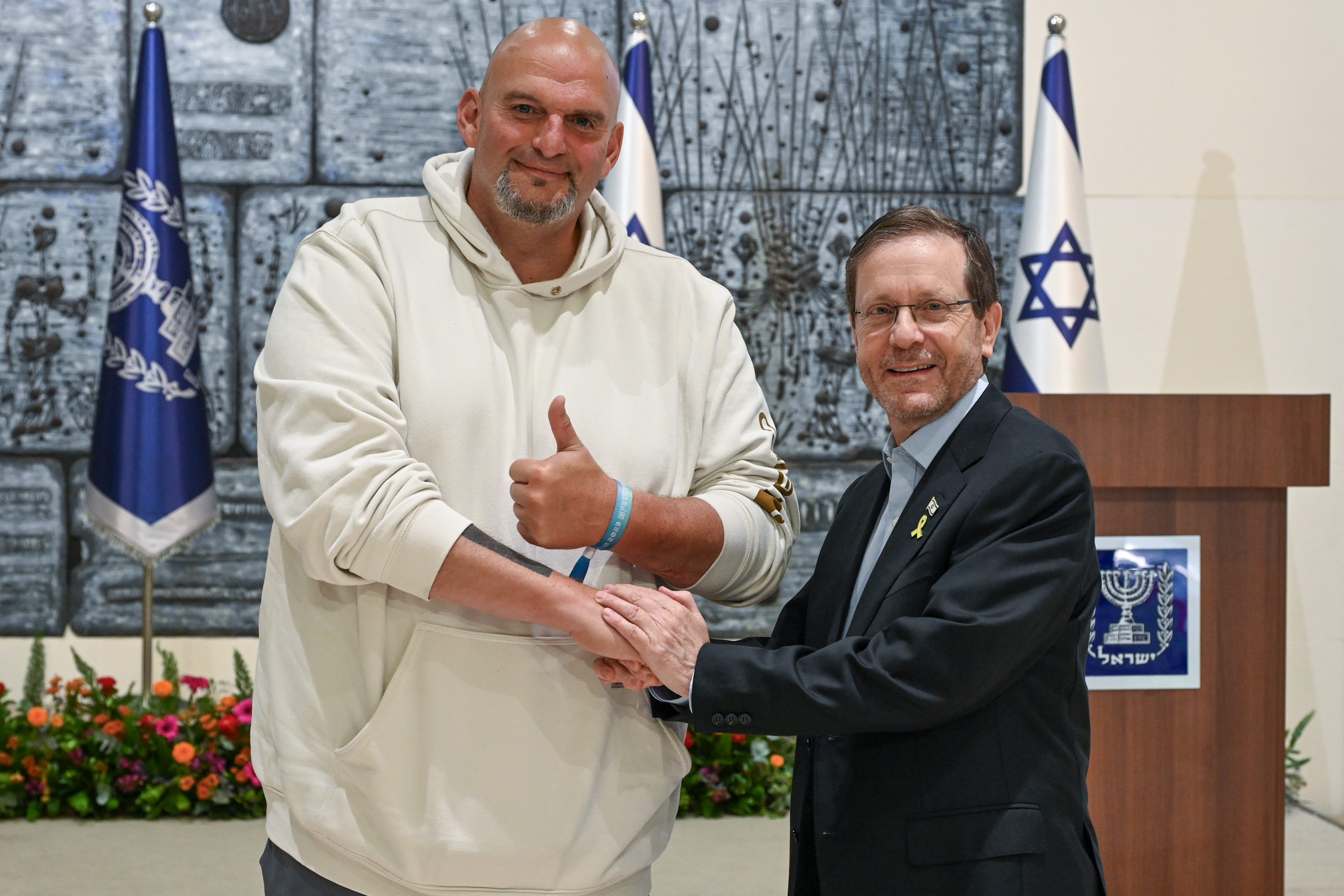
Fetterman with Israeli president Isaac Herzog on June 25, 2024.

Fetterman strongly supports Israel, its policies, and its relationship with the U.S. During his campaign, he said that as a U.S. senator he would "lean in" on the "relationship between the United States and Israel", adding that the U.S.–Israel relationship "is a special one that needs to be safeguarded, protected, supported and nurtured through legislation and all available diplomatic efforts in the region". He supports United States military aid to Israel, including Iron Dome funding. Fetterman criticized congressional Democrats who voted against Iron Dome funding, calling them "fringe" and "extreme". He has said he supports "Israel's right to defend itself" and is "passionate" in his opposition to the Boycott, Divestment and Sanctions movement. He supported an anti-BDS law signed by Pennsylvania governor Tom Wolf that barred Pennsylvania from entering into contracts with companies that boycott Israel. He was initially in support of a two-state solution and the expansion of the Abraham Accords, the Arab-Israeli set of agreements brokered during the first Trump administration. By 2025, Fetterman opposed a two-state solution, saying in a meeting with J Street President Jeremy Ben-Ami "You can't reform a carton of sour milk" in reference to the Palestinians, and that he had never met an Arab person who would condemn Hamas. Notes from the meeting read: "Correction, only a single Arab he has met with that staff was present for wouldn't outright condemn Hamas."

During the Gaza war, Fetterman steadfastly supported Israeli actions, placing blame for the conflict exclusively on Hamas. He has notably broken from Democrats with his ardent support for Israel in the Gaza war. Commentators have said that his views on Israel have shifted to the right since the conflict's inception and become more in line with those of Republicans. When confronted by pro-Palestine protesters outside the U.S. Capitol, he waved an Israeli flag. In a separate incident, Fetterman told a pro-Palestine activist she should "be protesting Hamas" instead of Israel. He has blamed TikTok for creating "warped" perceptions of the conflict and for widening divisions. When President Biden threatened to withhold some arms supplies to Israel, Fetterman called the threat "deeply disappointing". In June 2024, Fetterman visited Israel and met with President Isaac Herzog and Prime Minister Benjamin Netanyahu. Netanyahu said "Israel has had no better friend" than Fetterman. Netanyahu gave Fetterman a silver-plated beeper to commemorate the killing of Hezbollah members by Israel by exploding their pagers.Fetterman has supported Netanyahu's position against any permanent ceasefire that allows Hamas to remain functional. On March 26, 2024, Fetterman and Representative Josh Gottheimer denounced the Biden administration for not voting against United Nations Security Council Resolution 2728, which "demands an immediate ceasefire for the month of Ramadan respected by all parties leading to a permanent sustainable ceasefire, and also demands the immediate and unconditional release of all hostages". New York magazine reported that Fetterman opposed a ceasefire, saying, "let's get back to killing". He also said Israel should "kill them all". Fetterman's office told New York that these statements were about Hamas, not Palestinian civilians.

Fetterman called South Africa's genocide case against Israel "appalling" and said South Africa "ought to sit this one out". In January 2025, he was the only Democratic senator to vote with all Republicans for cloture on a bill to sanction the International Criminal Court in response to its warrants against Netanyahu and Israeli defense minister Yoav Gallant. In February 2025, Fetterman said he would "fully support" sending U.S. troops in Gaza after President Trump made his Gaza Strip ownership proposal. He called the proposal "provocative" but did not dismiss it, saying it was now "part of the conversation." In April, he was the only Democratic senator to join all Republicans in voting to confirm Mike Huckabee as ambassador to Israel.

In September 2025, Fetterman met with Israeli Ambassador to the United States Yechiel Leiter to discuss a potential resolution forcing every senator to take a position on whether the war in Gaza is a genocide. Leiter suggested that Fetterman instead write an opinion piece explaining his support for Israel. Fetterman said he would include talking points suggested by the Israeli Embassy in the piece. The Israeli Embassy forwarded suggestions for the article to Fetterman's office, but Fetterman's staffers did not tell him so, fearing Fetterman might violate the Foreign Agents Registration Act.

In December 2025, Fetterman wrote Israeli president Herzog a letter calling on him to pardon Netanyahu, who was on trial for corruption. Fetterman said the trial undermined Israel's security amid the Gaza War: "It seems that the legal proceedings against the Prime Minister, dragging on year after year, have become a drain on the nation's spirit and its focus. In a world this dangerous, I question whether any democracy can afford to have its head of government spending valuable hours, day after day, in a courtroom rather than the situation room".

In April 2026, Fetterman was one of seven Democratic senators to join all Republicans in opposing a pair of resolutions that would have blocked sales of bulldozers and 1,000-pound bombs to Israel. In May 2026, the Intelligencer reported that Fetterman has an informal Israel advisor, Dovi Safier, an American writer and grandson of Zev Wolfson. In advance of the article's publication, Fetterman's chief of staff Cabelle St. John resigned. On August 5, in an interview on the The Weekly Show with Jon Stewart, Fetterman rejected calling the Gaza war a "genocide". He was the sole Democrat to vote against Senate Resolution 852, which would require the State Department to produce a report on Israel's human rights practices and violence in the West Bank, including the killings of US citizens.

==== NATO ====
In 2023, Fetterman voted against an amendment to the National Defense Authorization Act that would have clarified that Article 5 of the NATO treaty does not obviate the need for Congress to declare war. Fetterman voted for Tim Kaine's amendment, which prohibits the president of the United States from withdrawing from NATO without congressional approval.

==== Ukraine ====
Fetterman supports military aid to Ukraine in the Russo-Ukrainian war. He said in 2023 that "If you can't support Ukraine right now, that's un-American and you're not standing up for democracy."

==== War powers ====
Fetterman was the sole Democratic senator to vote against a war powers resolution to prevent President Trump from launching further strikes on Iran after the June 2025 attacks on Iranian nuclear sites. He was the only Democratic senator to vote with all Republican senators to vote against a war powers resolution to prevent Trump from launching further strikes in the Caribbean after attacks on Venezuelan boats in September 2025.

=== Gun policy ===
Fetterman supports greater restrictions on gun purchases.

=== Healthcare ===
Fetterman has described himself as a supporter of Medicare for All, saying that healthcare is a "fundamental human need and right". In 2022, he said he would "support whatever path" is necessary to expand healthcare accessibility, including the expansion of the Affordable Care Act.

=== Immigration ===
Fetterman has called himself "perhaps the most pro-immigration member of the Senate" and has criticized the House Republican majority of the 118th United States Congress for what he perceives as unwillingness to compromise on border policy. He has called the issue "very personal" and important to him, connecting his views to his wife's status as a "DREAMer". But Fetterman has repeatedly expressed concern about the Mexico–United States border crisis, viewing the scale as unsustainable and calling for a bipartisan "reset" on border policy. This comment earned him criticism from progressives, causing many commentators to characterize it as an ideological break from his party. In a December 2023 interview, Fetterman said "I'm not a progressive" in regard to immigration.

Fetterman opposes abolishing ICE. In 2026, he criticized Operation Metro Surge and ICE's tactics after ICE agents fatally shot two U.S. citizens in Minneapolis. He also called for Homeland Security secretary Kristi Noem to be fired. Despite calls from the rest of Pennsylvania's Democratic congressional congregation, Fetterman said that, in order to avoid a government shutdown, he would not vote against a bill funding the Department of Homeland Security (DHS) and by extension ICE. He voted against the initial funding bill, but later supported a compromise bill that diminished DHS funding but maintained funding for other agencies. Fetterman supports ICE agents wearing masks, arguing that it protects them from doxing.

=== Lab-grown meat ===
Fetterman opposes lab-grown meat and has supported governors signing state bans, saying he "stands with our American ranchers and farmers".

=== LGBT rights ===
In March 2025, Fetterman joined every other Senate Democrat in voting against a bill that would ban trans girls and women from women's sports, saying, "The small handful of trans athletes in PA in a political maelstrom deserve an ally and I am one."

=== Marijuana ===
Fetterman is a proponent of legalizing marijuana, calling the issue a "political bazooka" and that leaving the issue alone is giving an opportunity for another party to gain political support for a pro–marijuana legalization agenda. He argued that if conservative South Dakota voters were willing to approve a ballot measure legalizing recreational marijuana, Pennsylvania should legalize it too. He also supports expunging criminal convictions related to marijuana.

=== Minimum wage ===
Fetterman supports raising the minimum wage to $15 an hour.

=== Oligarchy ===
In March 2025, Fetterman asked Democrats to talk like "regular" people instead of ranting about "oligarchy", saying that many people do not understand what an "oligarch" is. He expressed concern about "unlimited money" in politics, saying it harms democracy and can be mitigated by reducing financial influence.

=== Policing ===
Fetterman has described himself as "pro-policing", including pro-community policing. He opposes defunding the police, calling the movement "absurd", but supports the Black Lives Matter movement. After Derek Chauvin, a police officer who murdered an unarmed black man, George Floyd, was convicted of second-degree murder, Fetterman tweeted his support for the verdict, stating that Chauvin was "clearly guilty". As lieutenant governor, Fetterman supported legislation that would allow police to use deadly force only when officers or others nearby face imminent threat of death or serious injury.

=== Tariffs and trade ===
In 2015, The Patriot-News called Fetterman a "skeptic of free trade", given his opposition to the Trans-Pacific Partnership. Fetterman agreed with President Trump that tariffs could bring back manufacturing jobs but criticized Trump for focusing on Canada and Mexico rather than America's "real enemies".

=== Taxation ===
Fetterman supports implementing a wealth tax in the United States. He has said those "who have yachts" could be used as a potential benchmark.

=== Technology ===
In January 2025, Fetterman co-sponsored the Kids Off Social Media Act (KOSMA), which was introduced by Senator Brian Schatz, Chris Murphy, Ted Cruz, and Katie Britt. Senators Ted Budd, Peter Welch, John Curtis, Angus King, and Mark Warner also co-sponsored the Act, which would set a minimum age of 13 to use social media platforms and prevent social media companies from feeding "algorithmically targeted" content to users under 17.

Fetterman supports the expansion of AI data centers, alleging that the Chinese government has fomented opposition to AI data centers.

=== Unions ===
Fetterman is a supporter of labor unions, saying "The union way of life is sacred". He is a supporter of the PRO Act.

== Personal life ==
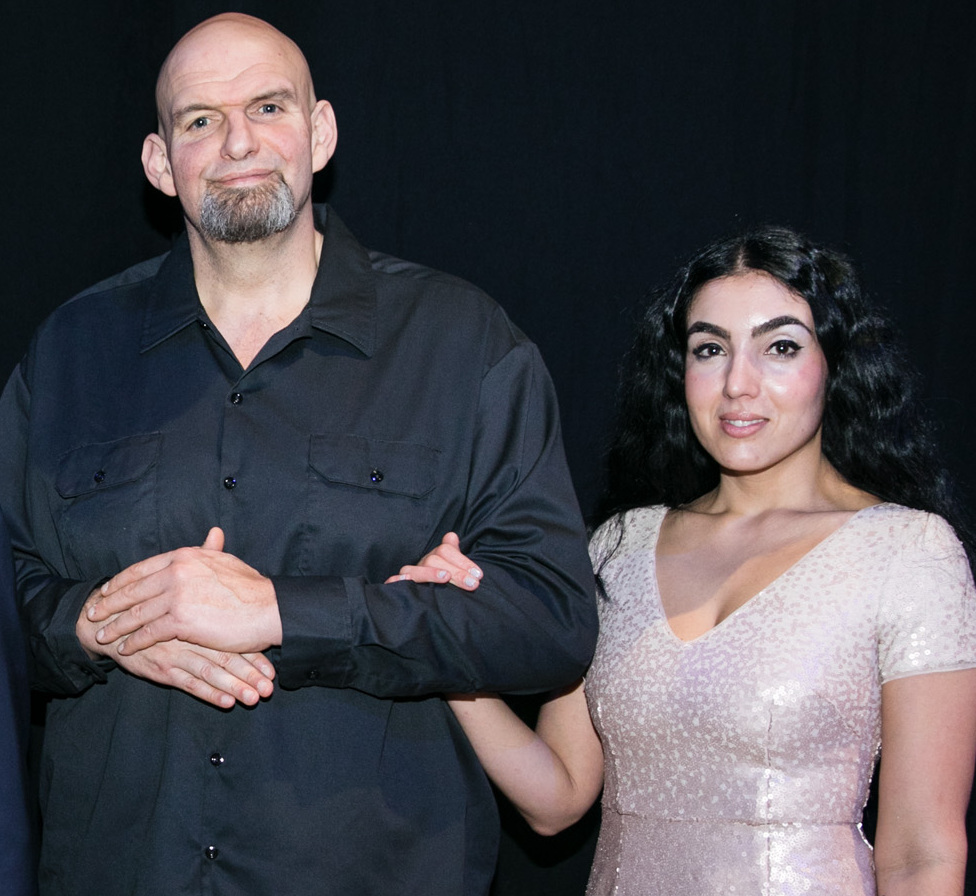
Fetterman and his wife Gisele Barreto Fetterman in 2019

Fetterman is married to Gisele Barreto Fetterman (née Almeida), a Brazilian-American activist. Almeida was once an undocumented immigrant and a resident of Newark, New Jersey. They met when she heard about Fetterman's work as mayor of Braddock, Pennsylvania, and wrote him a letter in 2007. Fetterman invited Almeida to visit Braddock, and a year later they were married. The couple has three children. The family lives in a converted car dealership with their rescue dogs, Levi and Artie. The family chose not to live in State House, the official residence for Pennsylvania's lieutenant governor. In 2008, Allegheny County sued Fetterman and his nonprofit Braddock Redux for unpaid taxes. Tax liens were placed against Fetterman and his nonprofit totaling $25,000. In 2012, Fetterman paid off the liens.

Fetterman is known for his casual style of dress. He often wears a sweatshirt and shorts, and for a long time owned only one suit, which he wore when presiding over the Pennsylvania Senate, where there is a dress code. Fetterman purchased a new suit for his swearing-in as a U.S. senator. He wore a hoodie and shorts during President Trump's second inauguration, and a suit and tie when Israeli prime minister Benjamin Netanyahu visited the United States in 2024.

In September 2023, Senate majority leader Chuck Schumer relaxed the unofficial Senate dress code, which was widely seen as a reaction to Fetterman, allowing him to vote in his usual outfit. In late September, the Senate reversed its decision, unanimously passing the "SHORTS Act" (S.Res. 376, short for "SHow [sic] Our Respect To the Senate Act"), referencing Fetterman's trademark outfit and establishing the Senate's first official dress code. The reversal came after a week of intense criticism by Republicans, some Democrats, and Fox News. The Philadelphia Inquirer reported that Fetterman has a net worth between $717,000 and $1.58 million. Fetterman's memoir, Unfettered, was released on November 11, 2025. The book was co-written with Friday Night Lights author Buzz Bissinger.

=== Health ===
According to Fetterman's former chief of staff Adam Jentleson, Fetterman has struggled with depression throughout his life. In 2017, Fetterman's feet suddenly began to swell and he was hospitalized for testing. At that time, cardiologist Ramesh Chandra diagnosed Fetterman with "atrial fibrillation, an irregular heart rhythm, along with a decreased heart pump", although this diagnosis was not known publicly until Fetterman's stroke in May 2022. In 2018, Fetterman spoke publicly about his substantial weight loss, which he attributed to having adopted a healthier diet. Fetterman, who is 6 feet 8 inches (2.03 m) tall, had weighed more than 400 pounds (180 kg) before losing approximately 150 pounds (70 kg). On June 4, 2019, The Philadelphia Inquirer reported that Fetterman "collapsed" while presiding over the State Senate; he became wobbly and grabbed the lectern to prevent himself from falling over, and a member of the Capitol's nursing staff came to examine him. Afterward, Fetterman's spokesperson said he had become overheated and was "back to normal".

On May 13, 2022, Fetterman had an ischemic stroke and was hospitalized. The stroke was induced by a clot caused by atrial fibrillation (irregular heart rhythm). Because Fetterman also had cardiomyopathy, his doctors implanted a pacemaker and defibrillator. He was discharged from the hospital on May 22, 2022. In an early June 2022 letter, Chandra wrote that Fetterman was "well compensated and stable" and that "If he takes his medications, eats healthy and exercises, he'll be fine." His doctors reported that Fetterman did not sustain cognitive damage, and that they expected a full recovery. Fetterman expressed regret for having ignored his health; after the 2017 diagnosis with atrial fibrillation, he did not see a doctor for five years and did not continue medications.

In an October 2022 letter providing a medical update, Fetterman's primary care physician said that he "spoke intelligently without cognitive deficits" during examination and had significantly improved communication compared to his first visit with the doctor. Fetterman's stroke left him with symptoms of an auditory processing disorder, and he uses closed captioning as an aid to read speech in real time. The physician noted that Fetterman regularly attends speech therapy, routinely exercises, takes appropriate heart medications, and "has no work restrictions and can work full duty in public office."

On February 8, 2023, Fetterman was hospitalized overnight after feeling lightheaded during a U.S. Senate retreat earlier that day. His office reported that he was in "good spirits and talking with his staff and family", and that his hospitalization was unrelated to his stroke. On February 16, 2023, Fetterman checked himself into Walter Reed Hospital due to clinical depression. A senior aide later said Fetterman would remain hospitalized for "likely less than two months" while he underwent treatment. Fetterman was discharged from Walter Reed on March 31. He returned to the Senate on April 17 and chaired an Agriculture Committee subcommittee to discuss Pennsylvania's farm issues.

In May 2024, Adam Jentleson, then Fetterman's chief of staff, wrote Walter Reed Hospital director David Williamson a letter expressing concern over Fetterman's mental health and alleged erratic behavior. Jentleson said that Fetterman engaged in "conspiratorial thinking", "megalomania", rambling monologues, reckless driving, and obvious lies, and was avoiding regular checkups with doctors and pushing away people responsible for helping him with his recovery plan. On June 9, 2024, Fetterman and his wife were involved in a two-car crash in Maryland. They were hospitalized, but quickly released. Fetterman was found to be at fault for the crash after rear-ending another vehicle while speeding.

While walking in Braddock on November 13, 2025, Fetterman suffered a ventricular fibrillation episode that made him dizzy, causing him to fall on his face and sustain minor injuries. The injuries to his face required 20 stitches. Ventricular fibrillation is a life-threatening heart rhythm that results in cardiac arrest; standard medical treatment requires immediate defibrillation to terminate the arrhythmia. A physician interviewed by NBC said that an implanted cardioverter-defibrillator, like the one Fetterman received in 2022, can detect ventricular fibrillation and deliver a shock to restore normal rhythm, although a person may collapse in the moment before the shock occurs.

=== Other media appearances ===
Fetterman made a cameo appearance in the 2022 film The Pale Blue Eye. In December 2022, he posted a photo of himself and his wife alongside actor Christian Bale on the set of the film. Fetterman also worked with Bale and the film's director, Scott Cooper, in 2013, when they filmed Out of the Furnace in Braddock. Fetterman is the subject of a 2025 diss track by RXKNephew, commissioned by Chapo Trap House.

== Electoral history ==
Braddock mayoral election, 2005 Democratic primary
Party	Candidate	Votes	%
Democratic	John Fetterman	149	35.06%
Democratic	Virginia Bunn	148	34.82%
Democratic	Pauline Abdullah (incumbent)	128	30.12%
Total votes		425	100.0%

Braddock mayoral election, 2005 general election
Party	Candidate	Votes	%
Democratic	John Fetterman	288	100.00%
Total votes		288	100.0%
Democratic hold			

Braddock mayoral election, 2009 Democratic primary
Party	Candidate	Votes	%
Democratic	John Fetterman (incumbent)	304	65.38%
Democratic	Jayme J. Cox	160	34.41%
Write-in		1	0.22%
Total votes		465	100.0%

Braddock mayoral election, 2009 general election
Party	Candidate	Votes	%
Democratic	John Fetterman (incumbent)	229	100.00%
Total votes		229	100.0%
Democratic hold			

Braddock mayoral election, 2013 Democratic primary
Party	Candidate	Votes	%
Democratic	John Fetterman (incumbent)	186	75.30%
Democratic	William David Speece	60	24.29%
Write-in		1	0.40%
Total votes		247	100.0%

Braddock mayoral election, 2013 general election
Party	Candidate	Votes	%
Democratic	John Fetterman (incumbent)	186	86.51%
Write-in		29	13.49%
Total votes		215	100.0%
Democratic hold			

Braddock mayoral election, 2017 Democratic primary
Party	Candidate	Votes	%
Democratic	John Fetterman (incumbent)	165	70.82%
Democratic	William David Speece	67	28.76%
Write-in		1	0.43%
Total votes		233	100.0%

Braddock mayoral election, 2017 general election
Party	Candidate	Votes	%
Democratic	John Fetterman (incumbent)	243	97.98%
Write-in		5	2.02%
Total votes		248	100.0%
Democratic hold			

U.S. Senator from Pennsylvania Democratic primary, 2016
Party	Candidate	Votes	%
Democratic	Katie McGinty	669,774	42.50%
Democratic	Joe Sestak	513,221	32.57%
Democratic	John Fetterman	307,090	19.49%
Democratic	Joseph Vodvarka	85,837	5.45%
Total votes		1,575,922	100.00%

Pennsylvania Lieutenant Gubernatorial Democratic primary, 2018
Party	Candidate	Votes	%
Democratic	John Fetterman	290,719	37.48%
Democratic	Nina Ahmad	184,429	23.78%
Democratic	Kathi Cozzone	143,849	18.55%
Democratic	Mike Stack (incumbent)	128,931	16.62%
Democratic	Ray Sosa	27,732	3.58%
Total votes		775,660	100.0%

Pennsylvania Gubernatorial general election, 2018
Party	Candidate	Votes	%	±%
Democratic	Tom Wolf (incumbent)/John Fetterman	2,895,652	57.77%	+2.84%
Republican	Scott Wagner/Jeff Bartos	2,039,882	40.70%	−4.37%
Libertarian	Ken Krawchuk/Kathleen Smith	49,229	0.98%	N/A
Green	Paul Glover/Jocolyn Bowser-Bostick	27,792	0.55%	N/A
Total votes		5,012,555	100.0%	N/A
Democratic hold				

United States Senate election, 2022 Democratic primary election
Party	Candidate	Votes	%
Democratic	John Fetterman	752,402	58.6
Democratic	Conor Lamb	336,933	26.3
Democratic	Malcolm Kenyatta	139,260	10.9
Democratic	Alexandria Khalil	54,351	4.2
Total votes		1,282,946	100.0

2022 United States Senate election in Pennsylvania
Party	Candidate	Votes	%	±%
Democratic	John Fetterman	2,751,012	51.25%	+3.91%
Republican	Mehmet Oz	2,487,260	46.33%	−2.44%
Libertarian	Erik Gerhardt	72,887	1.36%	−2.53%
Green	Richard L. Weiss	30,434	0.57%	N/A
Keystone	Dan Wassmer	26,428	0.49%	N/A
Total votes		5,368,021	100.0%	N/A
Democratic gain from Republican				

Political offices
Preceded by Pauline Abdullah	Mayor of Braddock; 2005–2019	Succeeded by Chardaé Jones
Preceded by Mike Stack	Lieutenant Governor of Pennsylvania; 2019–2023	Succeeded by Kim Ward; Acting
Party political offices
Preceded by Mike Stack	Democratic nominee for Lieutenant Governor of Pennsylvania; 2018	Succeeded by Austin Davis
Preceded by Katie McGinty	Democratic nominee for U.S. Senator from Pennsylvania (Class 3); 2022	Most recent
U.S. Senate
Preceded by Pat Toomey	U.S. Senator (Class 3) from Pennsylvania; 2023–present Served alongside: Bob Casey Jr., David McCormick	Incumbent
U.S. order of precedence (ceremonial)
Preceded by Alex Padilla	Order of precedence of the United States as United States Senator	Succeeded by Ted Budd
Preceded by Ted Budd	United States senators by seniority 81st	Succeeded by Eric Schmitt
