= Mark Reichel =

American lawyer

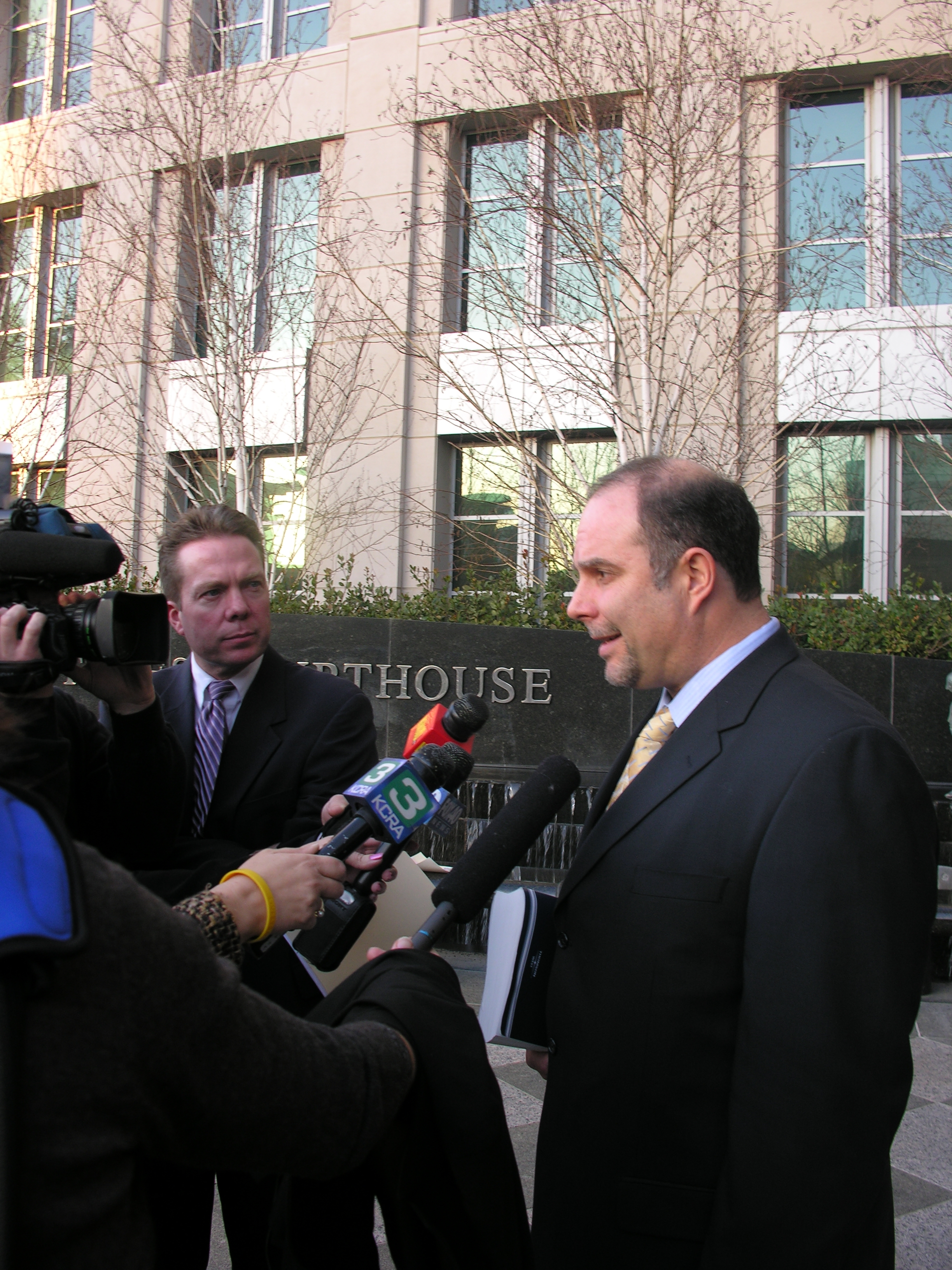
- Occupation: Attorney
- Known for: Criminal defense, civil liberties, U.S. Supreme Court litigation, television legal analyst
- Website: https://reichellaw.com

Mark J. Reichel is a criminal defense and civil litigation attorney in Sacramento, California. He was a partner in the law firm Reichel & Plesser until 2013, when he founded his own private practice. He is also the vice chairman of the Sacramento board of the American Civil Liberties Union.

During his time as a criminal defense and civil litigation attorney, Reichel has been involved in several prominent criminal and civil cases, including United States v. Eric McDavid and United States v. Grubbs.

== Education and accolades ==
Reichel attended college the McGeorge School of Law in Sacramento. He was selected as a finalist for the Best Brief and Best Oral Argument Award as well as giving the commencement speech for his graduating class of 1991.

Shortly after graduating from law school, Mark handled a civil rights lawsuit in a case that was featured across the nation and highlighted in the December 1992 issue of Life magazine. Reichel is also a 1995 graduate of the National Criminal Defense College in Macon, Georgia. Reichel has also been selected to the "Top Attorneys in Northern California" for 2008 by San Francisco magazine in their August 2008 edition, as well as the Top Attorneys of North America in their 2020-2021 edition.

== Career ==
Reichel spent 13 years as a trial attorney for the Federal Public Defender in Sacramento, where he was appointed to thousands of criminal cases. One of the most celebrated cases in Reichel's career came as he took United States v. Grubbs all the way from arraignment to argument in front of the United States Supreme Court. Reichel argued in this case that the Fourth Amendment requires officers to provide a copy of the search warrant to the homeowner when conducting a search.

After leaving the Federal Defender, he entered private practice in 2005, founding the Law Offices of Mark Reichel. Reichel became law partners with Steve Plesser , a prominent Sacramento criminal defense attorney, in May 2010 with the founding of Reichel & Plesser, LLP .

Soon thereafter, the firm, as part of a coordinated defense team, enjoyed a much publicized victory when the U.S. Department of Justice issued a press release announcing dismissal of all charges against prominent members of the Hmong community, (at one point the indictment included Hmong community leader and war hero, General Vang Pao), who were wrongly accused of plotting to overthrow the government of Laos. The failed prosecution had inspired massive rallies in support of the accused and had been roundly criticized as a betrayal of the brave Hmong who had fought on behalf of the United States during the Vietnam War.

== Notable cases ==
In 2006, while working for the Federal Public Defender's Office, Reichel defended Jeffrey Grubbs. His case was appealed to the Ninth Circuit Court of Appeals, then later to the U.S. Supreme Court where justices were asked to weigh in on whether the Fourth Amendment of the U.S. Constitution required police officers to hand criminal suspects a copy of a search warrant outlining the probable cause behind the warrant when it is executed on their homes.

After joining Reichel & Plesser, he represented Isaiah Fowler, a 12-year-old boy accused of stabbing and murdering his 8-year-old sister in 2013. A jury convicted Fowler based on a police interrogation, but Reichel successfully appealed Fowler's case, and an appellate court found two of the police interviews violated his rights. In 2018, an appellate court vacated Fowler's conviction, finding that the young man's confession was likely coerced. At his retrial, Fowler was convicted again by a different judge. Reichel told a local newspaper he intended to file another appeal.

In 2016, after forming his own private practice, Reichel represented Anthony Silva, the sitting mayor of Stockton, California, who was charged in connection with his work as a youth camp counselor. Prosecutors alleged Silva had secretly recorded several teenagers participating in a game of strip poker, with one of the teenagers reportedly being a minor at the time of the recording. Prosecutors also alleged Silva provided alcohol to minors. While Silva denied the accusations at the time, he entered a plea of no contest the following year to the alcohol charges. The charges related to the strip poker game were dismissed. Reichel was successful in convincing a judge to grant Silva a sentence of community service in lieu of jail time.

In 2017, Reichel represented one of five suspects accused of fighting with police officers in Davis, California during a local event known as Picnic Day. In an interview with an alternative newspaper, Reichel said his client and others involved in the melee were confused about the three police officers who approached them during the incident because they were wearing street clothes and did not identify themselves as law enforcement. Reichel successfully arranged a plea for his client that led to the eventual dismissal of the charges.

In 2019, Reichel was retained by Jeffrey David, a former executive with the Sacramento Kings professional basketball team, who was accused of embezzling more than $13 million to fund a lavish personal lifestyle. David pled guilty to fraud and was sentenced to seven years in prison.

In September 2025, Anibal Hernandez Santana was accused of firing several shots into the television studio of KXTV, the local ABC affiliate in Sacramento. Reichel offered his insight into the arrest in numerous news interviews two days before Hernandez Santana retained him as his defense attorney. After being arraigned on state and federal charges, Reichel characterized the federal case as politically-motivated.

== Media appearances ==
Reichel is often asked by local and national news reporters to comment on cases of public interest, and he has become a media personality known for his television appearances in Sacramento, where his law office is located.

During the Fowler case, Reichel made numerous appearances on local and national news and talk show programs, including HLN. In 2018, he was tapped to provide legal insight into law enforcement footage obtained by the Sacramento Bee related to the fatal shooting of Stephon Clark by Sacramento Police Department officers.

Reichel has offered extensive legal insight on the case of the Golden State Killer and Joseph DeAngelo, a former police officer who was arrested in 2018 on suspicion of committing many of the crimes in the case.

In 2025, Reichel became a regulator legal contributor to weekend news programs aired by the cable news outlet NewsNation. He also offered legal insight to Scripps News, prior to that channel's conversion into a free streaming network.
