= Steven T. Wax =

American lawyer

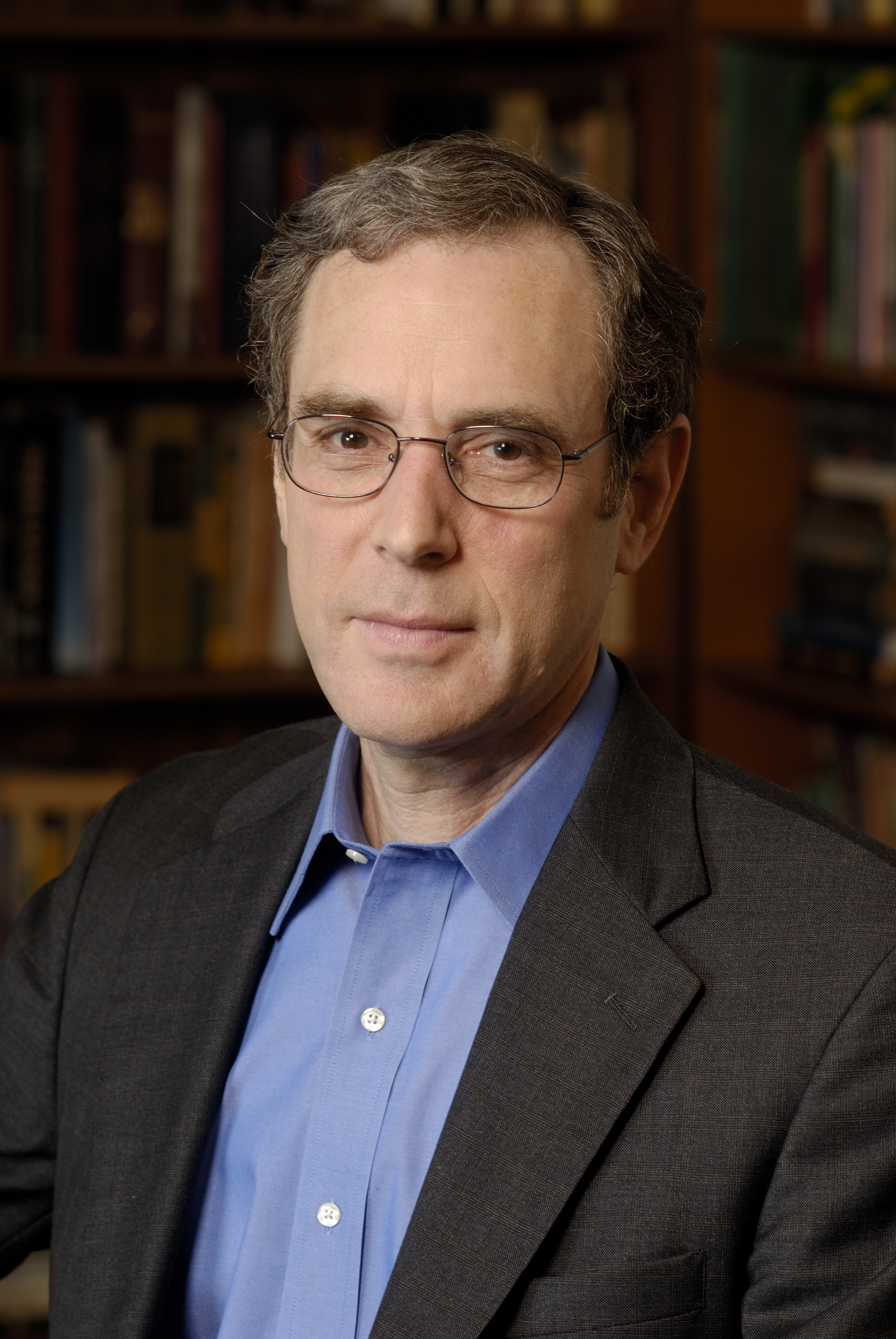
Steven T. Wax

Steven T. Wax (born 1949) was a U.S. federal Public Defender for the District of Oregon in Portland, Oregon. Wax resigned in 2014 from his position after 31 years and now works with the Oregon Innocence Project.

He is admitted to the U.S. District Court for districts of Southern and Eastern New York, the U.S. Courts of Appeals for the Second and Ninth circuits, and the U.S. Supreme Court.

Wax earned a B.A. cum laude from Colgate University in 1970 and a J.D. from Harvard Law School in 1974. He has been a member of the Oregon State Bar since 1983 and is also a member of the New York State Bar. He started in 1979 as an Assistant District Attorney in Brooklyn, New York and became the Public Defender in Broome County, New York from 1979 through 1983. He was an adjunct professor at Lewis & Clark Law School from 1985 through 1993 and in 2001.

Wax is married to Kathleen Haley, the Executive Director of the Oregon Medical Board.

== Notable work ==
Wax defended several of the detainees of the Guantanamo Bay detention camp. His Oregon office worked for Brandon Mayfield when he was arrested due to being erroneously linked with the 2004 Madrid train bombings by the FBI.

Wax wrote a book on the defense of Adel Hassan Hamad (a Sudanese Guantanamo detainee 2002–2006) and Brandon Mayfield.

== Awards ==
- NACDL President's Commendation for work on the Mayfield case 2004
- Judge Learned Hand Award of the American Jewish Committee 2006
