= Kenneth Fetterman =

American scam artist

Kenneth Fetterman is an American scam artist who occasionally partnered with Kenneth Walton to sell very expensive counterfeit art on rigged auctions on eBay.

One of his partners in the shill bidding was Kenneth Walton, who had, in May 2000, sold a fake painting that was at the time the highest price ever paid for a painting in an online auction. It was supposedly the undiscovered work of the late Northern California artist Richard Diebenkorn. However, the fraud was discovered, and after Walton was investigated, it was uncovered that Walton, Scott Beach, and Fetterman were involved in a shill bidding ring and that Fetterman had faked many paintings. After running from the authorities using various aliases and living off his fake paintings he was selling on eBay, he was finally caught indicted by a federal grand jury for rigging art auctions on eBay. In May 2004, Fetterman was sentenced to nearly four years in federal prison.

== Other references ==
- Walton, Kenneth (2006). Fake: Forgery, Lies, & eBay. Simon & Schuster. ISBN 1-4169-3461-8.
