= David P. Demarest =

American academic and writer

- Born: November 9, 1931; Englewood, New Jersey
- Died: October 15, 2011 (aged 79); Forbes Hospice, Pittsburgh, Pennsylvania
- Education: BA, Princeton University; MA, University of Connecticut; PhD in English literature, University of Wisconsin, Madison
- Occupations: Academic and writer

David P. Demarest (November 9, 1931 – October 15, 2011) was an American academic and writer best known for his work on organized labor, social geography, and US working-class literature.

== Life and career ==
He was born in Englewood New Jersey, grew up on 156 Jane Street, and graduated with a BA from Princeton University, a MA from the University of Connecticut, and a PhD in English literature from the University of Wisconsin, Madison. In 1964 he began a long and influential teaching career at Carnegie Mellon University.

In the 1970s Demarest's research on the social novel of Western Pennsylvania led to the publication of a pioneering anthology, From These Hills, From These Valleys, and the re-publication in 1976 of Out of This Furnace by Thomas Bell, an overlooked 1941 proletarian novel of the American steel industry that became a bestseller for the University of Pittsburgh Press. Demarest's play "Gift To America" brought attention in the 1980s to the Croatian-American artist Maxo Vanka and his Millvale Murals at St. Nicholas Croatian Church. In the 1990s Demarest's work to document and preserve industrial landscapes resulted in a book and film commemorating the centennial of the Homestead Strike of 1892 and the historic restoration of the Pump House of the Homestead Steel Works, where agents of the Pinkerton National Detective Agency attempted to land their barges and re-take control of the mill for Andrew Carnegie and Henry Clay Frick from the locked-out workers. Demarest was also a founder of the nonprofit Battle of Homestead Foundation that promotes awareness of labor history. For years, too, he championed the restoration and preservation of the Carnegie Free Library of Braddock, the first Carnegie library in the US built in Braddock, Pennsylvania in 1888.

His parents were David P. Demarest Sr., and Ruth Marsland Demarest.

== Illness and death ==
Diagnosed with Alzheimer's disease, Demarest died at the Forbes Hospice in Pittsburgh, Pennsylvania, on October 15, 2011. Burial arrangements were private.

== Books ==
- Legal Language and Situation in the Eighteenth Century Novel: Readings in Defoe, Richardson, Fielding, and Austen, dissertation (Madison: University of Wisconsin, 1963).
- The Ghetto Reader, co-editor with Lois Lamdin (New York: Random House, 1970).
- From These Hills, From These Valleys: Selected Fiction about Western Pennsylvania, (Pittsburgh: University of Pittsburgh Press, 1976).
- Out of This Furnace, Thomas Bell, Afterword by David Demarest (Pittsburgh: University of Pittsburgh Press, 1976).
- The Homestead Strike of 1892, Arthur Burgoyne, Afterword by David Demarest (Pittsburgh: University of Pittsburgh Press, 1979).
- The River Ran Red: Homestead, 1892, co-editor with Fannia Weingartner (Pittsburgh: University of Pittsburgh Press, 1992).

== Film ==
- Out of This Furnace: A Walking Tour of Thomas Bell's Novel, with Steffi Domike, video, 1990, distributed by the University of Pittsburgh Press.

== Sources ==
Contemporary Authors Online. The Gale Group, 2008.
