= Frederick A. Hetzel =

Frederick Armstrong Hetzel (September 6, 1930 – September 13, 2003) was an American publisher and academic.

== Biography ==
Hetzel was born and raised in Connellsville, Pennsylvania. He received degrees from Washington and Jefferson College and the University of Virginia. He was an associate editor at the Institute of Early American History and Culture in Williamsburg, Virginia before going to the University of Pittsburgh in 1961.

He served on the boards of Mendelssohn Choir, the Pittsburgh Dance Council, and Winchester Thurston School.

Hetzel was the director of the University of Pittsburgh Press in Pittsburgh, Pennsylvania, from 1964 to 1994, significantly growing the publishing house. In his efforts to acquire the best available scholarship, he focused Pitt scholarly titles in selected academic areas: history, political science, international studies, Latin American studies, Russian and East European studies, composition and literacy studies, natural history, and history and philosophy of science. Hetzel personally directed Press books about Pittsburgh and the region, including titles in history, natural history, photography, biography, guidebooks, and creative non-fiction.

Special literary and academic series developed by Hetzel include the renowned Pitt Poetry Series; the Pitt Latin American Series; the Pittsburgh Series in Descriptive Bibliography; the Pitt Series in Russian and East European Studies; the Pittsburgh Series in Composition, Literacy, and Culture; and the Pittsburgh-Konstanz Series in Philosophy. Annual publications included volumes in Milton Studies and Cuban Studies and the winners of the Agnes Lynch Starrett Poetry Prize, the AWP Award Series in Poetry, and the Drue Heinz Literature Prize. Hetzel co-published titles with the Carnegie Museum of Art, the Carnegie Museum of Natural History, the Carnegie Library of Pittsburgh, the Helen Clay Frick Foundation, the Historical Society of Western Pennsylvania, and the Frick Art & Historical Center. One of Hetzel's greatest publishing success stories was in 1976 when the University of Pittsburgh Press reissued Thomas Bell's Out of This Furnace to wide acclaim.

== Military service ==
He was awarded a Bronze Star for his Army service in the Korean War.

== Death and burial ==
Hetzel died at age 73 on September 13, 2003, at his Squirrel Hill home in Pittsburgh and is buried at Homewood Cemetery.
