= Helen Conkling =

American poet

- Born: 1933 (age 92–93); United States
- Occupation: Poet
- Writing career
- Notable work: Red Peony Night
- Notable awards: Agnes Lynch Starrett Poetry Prize (1996)

Helen Conkling (born 1933 (Note: 1928 year of birth is also recorded.)) is an American poet. Her work has appeared in the Antioch Review, Georgia Review, the Hudson Review, Chicago Review, the Ohio Review and Prairie Schooner. In 1996, she was the recipient of the Agnes Lynch Starrett Poetry Prize.

== Works ==
- "Snakes", Poetry Daily
- "Never to Go Out in a City in the Rain,” “December 1941,” and “At the Winter Solstice”, Traffic East, Issue 3
- Red Peony Night. University of Pittsburgh Press. 1997. ISBN 978-0-8229-4042-5.
