= Nižný Tvarožec =

- Municipality
- Flag

- Location of Nižný Tvarožec in the Prešov Region Location of Nižný Tvarožec in Slovakia
- Coordinates: 49.35°N 21.18°E
- Country: Slovakia
- Region: Prešov Region
- District: Bardejov District
- First mentioned: 1355

Area
  - Total: 11.15 km^{2} (4.31 sq mi)
- Elevation: 416 m (1,365 ft)

Population (2025)
  - Total: 578
- Time zone: UTC+1 (CET)
  - Summer (DST): UTC+2 (CEST)
- Postal code: 860 2
- Area code: +421 54
- Vehicle registration plate (until 2022): BJ
- Website: www.niznytvarozec.sk

Nižný Tvarožec is a village and municipality in Bardejov District in the Prešov Region of north-east Slovakia.

== History ==
In historical records the village was first mentioned in 1355.

The village is best known in the English-speaking world as the ancestral village of the American novelist Thomas Bell (1903—1961). His popular 1941 novel Out of This Furnace is the story of three generations of a family, starting with their migration in 1881 from Austria-Hungary to the United States, and finishing with World War II. The novel's title refers to the central role of the steel mill in the family's life and in the history of the Pittsburgh region.

== Geography ==
The municipality lies at an altitude of 416 metres (1,365 ft) and covers an area of 11.15 km^{2} (4.31 sq mi) (2025).

== Population ==
Population statistic (10 years)
Year	1995	2005	2015	2025
Count	455	468	521	578
Difference		+2.85%	+11.32%	+10.94%

Population statistic
Year	2024	2025
Count	570	578
Difference		+1.40%

It has a population of 578 people (31 December 2025).

=== Ethnicity ===
Census 2021 (1+ %)
Ethnicity	Number	Fraction
Slovak	471	87.38%
Romani	199	36.92%
Rusyn	89	16.51%
Not found out	27	5%
Total	539	

In year 2021 was 539 people by ethnicity 471 as Slovak, 199 as Romani, 89 as Rusyn, 27 as Not found out, 2 as Czech, 1 as Ukrainian and 1 as Russian.

Note on population: The difference values of population numbers in the table "Population statistic" and in the sections "Ethnicity" & "Religion" is caused by the use of various statistical methods.

=== Religion ===
Census 2021 (1+ %)
Religion	Number	Fraction
Greek Catholic Church	431	79.96%
Roman Catholic Church	35	6.49%
Not found out	27	5.01%
None	24	4.45%
Eastern Orthodox Church	12	2.23%
Evangelical Church	10	1.86%
Total	539	

In year 2021 was 539 people by religion 431 from Greek Catholic Church, 35 from Roman Catholic Church, 27 from Not found out, 24 from None, 12 from Eastern Orthodox Church and 10 from Evangelical Church.
