= Nancy Vieira Couto =

American poet (born 1942)

- Born: 1942 (age 83–84)
- Education: Bridgewater State College (BS); Cornell University (MFA)
- Occupation: Poet
- Writing career
- Notable awards: Agnes Lynch Starrett Poetry Prize (1989)

Nancy Vieira Couto (born 1942) is an American poet. She is a recipient of the Agnes Lynch Starrett Poetry Prize and the National Endowment for the Arts for Poetry award.

== Life ==
She received her BS in Education from Bridgewater State College in 1964, and her MFA in English from Cornell University, in 1980. She has been poetry editor at Epoch magazine for the past ten years.

Her work has appeared in American Voice, Black Warrior Review, Diagram, Iowa Review, Kalliope, Mississippi Review, Nimrod, Prairie Schooner, Salamander, Shenandoah, Southern Review.

She lives in Ithaca, New York.

== Awards ==
- 1989 Agnes Lynch Starrett Poetry Prize
- National Endowment for the Arts for Poetry 1987 and 1999

== Works ==
- "The Butterfly Effect"; "The Common Accident"; "Beyond Modernity, We Are Warned"; "The Accidentals", Poems x 4
- The Face in the Water. University of Pittsburgh Press. 1990. ISBN 978-0-8229-3652-7.

=== Anthology ===
- William H. Roetzheim, ed. (2006). "Living in the La Brea Tar Pits". The Giant Book of Poetry. Level4Press Inc. ISBN 978-0-9768001-2-5.
- Ed Ochester, Peter Oresick, ed. (1993). The Pittsburgh book of contemporary American poetry. University of Pittsburgh Press. ISBN 978-0-8229-3752-4.

=== Translation ===
- Joao Cruz E Sousa (1996). "Antiphony". In Stephen Tapscott (ed.). Twentieth-century Latin American poetry: a bilingual anthology. University of Texas Press. ISBN 978-0-292-78140-5.
