= Agnes Lynch Starrett Poetry Prize =

The Agnes Lynch Starrett Poetry Prize is a major American literary award for a first full-length book of poetry in the English language.

This prize of the University of Pittsburgh Press in Pittsburgh, Pennsylvania, United States was initiated by Ed Ochester and developed by Frederick A. Hetzel. The prize is named for a former director of the Press. It has both recognized and supported emerging poets, which has allowed their work to become available to readers around the world.

The award is open to any poet writing in English who has not had a full-length book published previously. Entry requires the payment of a significant fee. A "full-length book" of poetry is defined as a volume of 48 or more pages published in an edition of 500 or more copies. The prize carries a cash award of $5,000 and publication by the University of Pittsburgh Press in the Pitt Poetry Series. The winner is announced in the fall of each year.

== Winners ==
- 1981 — Kathy Callaway, Heart of the Garfish
- 1982 — Lawrence Joseph, Shouting at No One
- 1983 — Kate Daniels, The White Wave
- 1984 — Arthur Smith, Elegy on Independence Day
- 1985 — Liz Rosenberg, The Fire Music
- 1986 — Robley Wilson, Kingdoms of the Ordinary
- 1987 — David Rivard, Torque
- 1988 — Maxine Scates, Toluca Street
- 1989 — Nancy Vieira Couto, The Face in the Water
- 1990 — Debra Allbery, Walking Distance
- 1991 — Julia Kasdorf, Sleeping Preacher
- 1992 — Hunt Hawkins, The Domestic Life
- 1993 — Natasha Sajé, Red Under the Skin
- 1994 — Jan Beatty, Mad River
- 1995 — Sandy Solomon, Pears, Lake, Sun
- 1996 — Helen Conkling, Red Peony Night
- 1997 — Richard Blanco, City of a Hundred Fires
- 1998 — Shara McCallum, The Water Between Us
- 1999 — Daisy Fried, She Didn't Mean To Do It
- 2000 — Quan Barry, Asylum
- 2001 — Gabriel Gudding, A Defense of Poetry
- 2002 — Shao Wei, Pulling a Dragon's Teeth
- 2003 — David Shumate, High Water Mark
- 2004 — Aaron Smith, Blue on Blue Ground
- 2005 — Rick Hilles, Brother Salvage: Poems
- 2006 — Nancy Krygowski, Velocity
- 2007 — Michael McGriff, Dismantling the Hills
- 2008 — Cheryl Dumesnil, In Praise of Falling
- 2009 — Bobby C. Rogers, Paper Anniversary
- 2010 — Glenn Shaheen, Predatory
- 2011 — Dore Kiesselbach, Salt Pier
- 2012 — Kasey Jueds, Keeper
- 2013 — Sarah Rose Nordgren, Best Bones
- 2014 — Nate Marshall, Wild Hundreds
- 2015 — Miriam Bird Greenberg, In the Volcano's Mouth
- 2016 — Erin Adair-Hodges, Let's All Die Happy
- 2017 — Tiana Clark, I Can't Talk About Trees Without the Blood
- 2018 — Ryan Black, The Tenant of Fire
- 2019 — Eleanor Boudreau, Earnest, Earnest?
- 2020 — Laura Kolbe, Little Pharma
- 2021 — Anuradha Bhowmik, Brown Girl Chromatography
- 2022 - 2023 — Ryler Dustin, Trailer Park Psalms
- 2024 — Nathan Xavier Osorio, Querida
- 2025 — Bobby Elliot, The Same Man

== See also ==
- American poetry
- List of poetry awards
- List of literary awards
- List of years in poetry
- List of years in literature
