= Sarah Rose Nordgren =

American poet

- Education: Sarah Lawrence College; University of North Carolina at Greensboro; University of Cincinnati
- Occupation: Poet
- Awards: Agnes Lynch Starrett Poetry Prize; James Wright Poetry Prize
- Website: sarahrosenordgren.com

Sarah Rose Nordgren is an American poet. She is the author of Darwin’s Mother and Best Bones, the latter winner of the 2013 Agnes Lynch Starrett Prize.

== Early life and education ==
Sarah Rose Nordgren was raised in Durham, North Carolina. She has a BA in Liberal Arts from Sarah Lawrence College, an MFA in Poetry from The University of North Carolina at Greensboro where she held the Fred Chappell Fellowship, and a PhD in English and Creative Writing from the University of Cincinnati, with a Graduate Certificate in Women's, Gender, and Sexuality Studies, where she was also a Taft Summer Research Fellow and a Ricking Dissertation Fellow.

== Career ==
Nordgren's first poetry collection, Best Bones, was published in 2014 by University of Pittsburgh Press. The collection, with themes of myth, identity, domestic life, and loss, won the 2013 Agnes Lynch Starrett Prize for a first book. Her second collection, Darwin’s Mother, published in 2017 also by University of Pittsburgh Press, is an exploration of evolution, natural science, and humanity's place in the world, and was a finalist for the 2018 Ohioana Library Association Book Award for Poetry.

Nordgren is the recipient of two fellowships from the Fine Arts Work Center in Provincetown, MA, as well as an Individual Excellence Award from the Ohio Arts Council. She has also received scholarships from the Bread Loaf Writers’ Conference, a fellowship from the Sewanee Writers' Conference, and residencies at the Vermont Studio Center and Virginia Center for the Creative Arts. She won the 2012 James Wright Poetry Award from Mid-American Review.

Nordgren also creates video and performance art with dance and video maker Kathleen Kelley under the name Smart Snow. Their performance installation, Digitized Figures, was produced at the Gowanus Lofts in Brooklyn, NY in 2016. “Territory,” a poetry and dance video, was published by TriQuarterly Magazine in 2018.

Nordgren is an Associate Editor for the journal 32 Poems. She lives in Cincinnati, Ohio.

== Selected publications ==
- Best Bones, (University of Pittsburgh Press, 2014)
- Darwin’s Mother, (University of Pittsburgh Press, 2017)

== Awards ==
- Agnes Lynch Starrett Poetry Prize, Best Bones, 2013
- James Wright Poetry Prize from Mid-American Review, 2012
