= Nathan Xavier Osorio =

American poet and educator

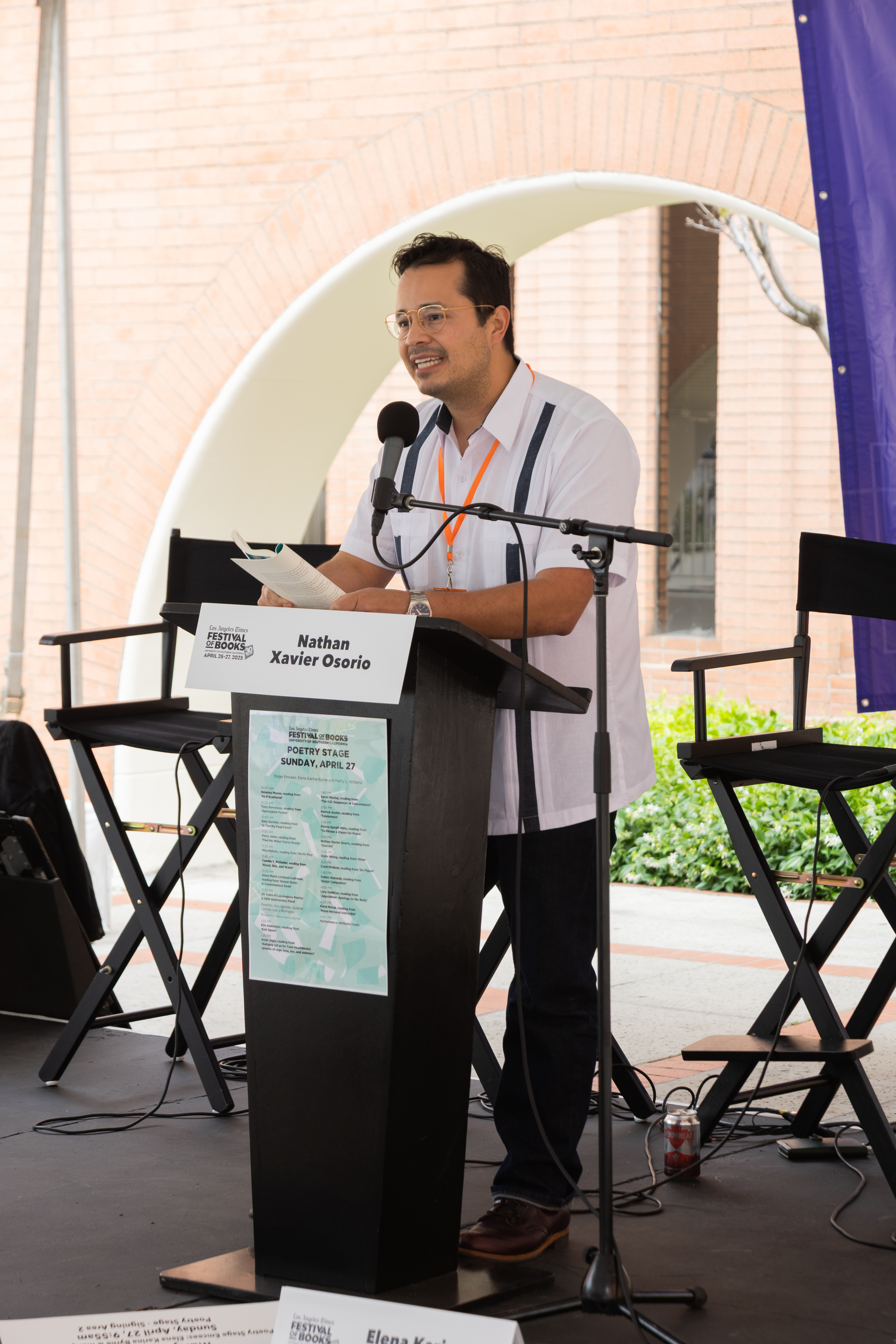
- Osorio at LA Book Fest 2025
- Born: Los Angeles, California, U.S.
- Education: University of California, Santa Cruz; Columbia University School of the Arts
- Occupations: Poet, educator
- Employer: Texas Tech University
- Writing career
- Language: English
- Genre: Poetry
- Notable works: Querida; The Last Town Before the Mojave
- Notable awards: Agnes Lynch Starrett Poetry Prize (2024)

Nathan Xavier Osorio is an American poet and educator from Los Angeles, California. He is the author of Querida, which won the 2024 Agnes Lynch Starrett Poetry Prize and was published by the University of Pittsburgh Press. His chapbook The Last Town Before the Mojave was selected by Oliver de la Paz for the Poetry Society of America’s 2020 Chapbook Fellowship. In 2025, Osorio was selected as the 46th resident poet of the Dartmouth poet-in-residence at Frost Place.

Osorio’s poetry, translations, and essays have appeared in BOMB, The Offing, Boston Review, Public Books, and Notre Dame Review.

== Early life and education ==
Osorio was born and raised in Los Angeles, California. He is of Mexican and Nicaraguan descent and is the son of a grocer and a nurse. He earned a PhD in Literature from University of California, Santa Cruz, with a concentration in Latin American and Latino Studies and Visual Studies, and has an MFA in Poetry and Literary Translation from Columbia University School of the Arts.

== Career ==
Osorio is an Assistant Professor of Creative Writing at Texas Tech University. In 2023, he served as a Humanities Institute Public Fellow at the University of California Press, and in 2024 he was selected as a Chancellor’s Postdoctoral Fellow at University of California, Irvine, where he worked with Héctor Tobar on a poetry project, Tierra Madre.

== Poetry ==
Osorio’s poetry engages with themes of migration and family history, particularly the experience of growing up in Los Angeles as the child of immigrants. In an essay accompanying his poem “English as a Second Language,” he has described his work as shaped by his parents’ migration from Nicaragua and Mexico and by recurring travel between Southern California and Baja California.

He has characterized his debut collection, Querida, as a reflection of his family and home life. He has also explained using literary devices like ekphrasis and non-Western cosmologies as part of his poetics. In an interview with poet Eduardo Martínez-Leyva, Osorio described his work as an attempt to create new rituals and forms that make room for vulnerability while challenging inherited structures of power.

=== Books ===
Title	Year	Type	Publisher	Notes
Querida	2024	Poetry collection	University of Pittsburgh Press	Winner of the Agnes Lynch Starrett Poetry Prize
The Last Town Before the Mojave	2022	Chapbook	Poetry Society of America	Selected for the Poetry Society of America’s 2020 Chapbook Fellowship

== Selected poems ==
- "English as a Second Language," Poetry Society of America
- “Overtime,” and "13 More American Landscapes,

a View-Master Reel," Frozen Sea

- "Hymn for the Last Town," Poetry Society of America
- "Shelf Life," The Slowdown
- "Empty Stadiums," "How to Cook a Wolf," and "Come, Little Hunger," Shō Poetry Journal

== Awards and honors ==
- Agnes Lynch Starrett Poetry Prize (2024), for Querida
- Dartmouth Poet-in-Residence, The Frost Place (2025)
- Poetry Society of America Chapbook Fellowship (2020), for The Last Town Before the Mojave
- Finalist, California Book Award in Poetry, for Querida (2025)
- Finalist, Poetry Society of America Norma Faber First Book Award, for Querida (2025)
