= Kate Daniels =

American poet

- Born: July 2, 1953 (age 73); Richmond, Virginia
- Education: Columbia University; University of Virginia
- Writing career
- Genre: Poetry
- Subjects: Working-class South; gender; addiction
- Notable awards: Agnes Lynch Starrett Prize 1983 The White Wave; Guggenheim Fellowship 2013 Poetry

Kate Daniels (born July 2, 1953 in Richmond, Virginia) is an American poet.

== Life ==
Kate Daniels was born in Richmond, Virginia. She was educated at the University of Virginia (B.A. and M.A. in English Literature) and Columbia University (M.F.A. School of the Arts). Her teaching career has taken her to the University of Virginia; the University of Massachusetts Amherst; Louisiana State University; Wake Forest University; Bennington College; and Vanderbilt University.

Kate Daniels resides in Nashville, Tennessee, where she is the Edwin Mims Professor of English and Director of Creative Writing at Vanderbilt University. She has served as Poet in Residence at both Duke University Medical Center and Vanderbilt University Medical Center, and has been a visiting scholar at the Center for Biomedical Ethics and the Humanities at the University of Virginia. She is also on the writing faculty of the Baltimore Washington Center for Psychoanalysis, and has presented on the intersections of psychoanalysis and poetry at several training institutes. In Nashville, and other communities, she pursues her interest in using creative writing as an aspect of treatment for and recovery from drug addiction by teaching workshops on Writing for Recovery.

=== Themes ===
Daniels' poetry consistently explores aspects of gender-based and Southern working class experience, and has been described as "distinct in the general history of southern poetry in its devotion to recovering the urban, working-class South, presenting a vision of the literal and cultural poverty" of such lives." She also explores addiction as a family illness.

=== Publications ===
Her first book of poetry, The White Wave (University of Pittsburgh Press, 1984), won the Agnes Lynch Starrett Poetry Prize. Her second volume, The Niobe Poems (University of Pittsburgh, 1988), received honorable mention for the Paterson Poetry Prize. Four Testimonies, her third volume, was selected by Dave Smith for his imprint Southern Messenger Series, published by LSU Press (1998). A fourth volume, A Walk in Victoria's Secret, was published in 2011 in the same series. Two new volumes -- Three Syllables Describing Addiction and In the Months of My Son's Recovery—are forthcoming in 2018 and 2019.

Daniels received the 2011 Hanes Award from Poetry by the Fellowship of Southern Writers, and was elected to the membership of the Fellowship of Southern Writers in 2015. She was a Guggenheim Fellow in Poetry 2013–14.

Her poems have appeared in numerous journals and magazines, and have been the recipient of awards including the Best American Poetry 2010, edited by Amy Gerstler; the Best American Poetry 2008, edited by Charles Wright; the Crazyhorse Prize for Poetry; a Pushcart Prize, the Louisiana Literature Poetry Prize, and the James Dickey Prize from Five Points: A Journal of Literature and Art. In 2003, she served as a judge for the National Book Award in Poetry. She has participated in the Lannan Poetry Foundation's Readings & Conversations programs, interviewing Philip Levine and Tony Hoagland.

== Awards ==
- Guggenheim Fellowship for Poetry, 2013–14
- Hanes Award for Poetry, Fellowship of Southern Writers, 2011
- Library of Virginia Prize for Poetry, Honorable Mention, 2011
- Lannan Foundation Writers Residency Fellowship, 2009 Lannan Foundation
- Best American Poetry of 2010
- Best American Poetry of 2008
- Pushcart Prize
- Crazyhorse Prize for Poetry
- Louisiana Literature Poetry Prize
- James Dickey Prize
- Agnes Lynch Starrett Poetry Prize
- Bunting Fellowship, Harvard University

== Works ==
=== Poetry ===
- In the Months of My Son's Recovery. Louisiana State University Press, 2019. ISBN 978-0807170359
- Three Syllables Describing Addiction. Bull City Press, 2018. ISBN 978-1949344059
- A Walk in Victoria's Secret. Louisiana State University Press. 2010. ISBN 978-0-8071-3706-2.
- Four Testimonies. Louisiana State University Press. 1998. ISBN 978-0-8071-2260-0.
- The Niobe Poems. University of Pittsburgh Press. 1988. ISBN 978-0-8229-3596-4.
- The White Wave. University of Pittsburgh Press. 1984. ISBN 978-0-8229-3493-6.

=== Prose ===
- Kate Daniels & Richard Jones, editors (1982). Beacon Press. ISBN 0-8070-6361-4.
- Kate Daniels, ed. (1992). Out of Silence: Selected Poems of Muriel Rukeyser. Northwestern University Press. ISBN 978-0-8101-5015-7.
