= Church of St. John the Evangelist (Hunter, New York) =

Historic church in New York, United States

- U.S. National Register of Historic Places
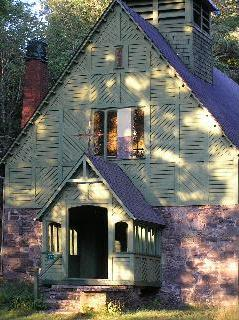
- Church of St. John the Evangelist, August 2010

- Location within New York Location within the United States
- Location: Philadelphia Hill Rd., Hunter, New York
- Coordinates: 42°10′56″N 74°8′53″W
- Area: 1.5 acres (0.61 ha)
- Built: 1885
- Architect: Wood, William Halsey
- Architectural style: Stick/Eastlake
- NRHP reference No.: 04000352
- Added to NRHP: April 21, 2004

Church of St. John the Evangelist is an historic Episcopal church located in the village of Tannersville, part of the town of Hunter in Greene County, New York. It was built in 1885 and is a one-story, one-by-six bay structure. It is built of light frame construction atop partial fieldstone walls on a fieldstone foundation. It features a steeply pitched gable roof with a large square belfry on the ridge. It was designed by architect William Halsey Wood (1855–1897).

It was added to the National Register of Historic Places in 2004.

== Construction ==
Prior to the building of St. John the Evangelist Episcopal Church, members of the Society of St. John the Evangelist (also known as the Cowley fathers) held Episcopal services in the Hunter area in local hotels, such as Blythewood, the Laurel House, and the Catskill Mountain House, as well as in the Union Meeting House and a one-room school house on Platt Clove Road.

The architect of the church was William Halsey Wood. Mr. and Mrs. Alexander Hemsley, the parents of Wood's finance Florence Hemsley and owners of Blythewood, donated the land for the construction of the new church, and also built the road to it, now known as Philadelphia Hill Road. The church opened on the tenth Sunday after Trinity, in early August, 1885, named St. John the Evangelist in honor of the Cowley fathers. Wood and Hemsley wed in the Church on the 19th of November 1889.

Wood chose a simple Gothic design for the church, with a "serene and pleasing" vaulted interior and clerestory of wood. While St. Clements Church, Philadelphia, gifted a substantial oak altar to St. John's, the new church was not quite finished on its opening Sunday. An article in The Church Standard, dated 19 August 1885 noted, "At that time the windows had yet to be installed, the lathing and plastering were incomplete." Nor did the church yet have its distinctive lotus blossom ceiling paintings.

== Early history ==
The new church met not only a spiritual need in the area but also provided a selling point for local hoteliers. The first of many baptisms occurred only days after the church opened, on 16 August 1885. And in the advertisement for Blythewood she posted in the Summer Resorts section of The Churchman, in 1886, Mrs. Hemsley wrote:

The ninth season of this elegant resort will begin on June 15th. The house has been entirely rebuilt and refurbished: many improvements made; large, airy bedrooms; more parlors, etc. Steam heat and gas also introduced. The house stands +2000 feet above tide-water and commands a charming view from the piazza of the adjacent mountains and sunset in the Gap. The grounds are well-shaded; fine tennis courts, etc. The abundant table and well-known home-like character of the house have always brought to it the best class of travellers. Good laundry and livery. Railroad station within five minutes' walk. Episcopal church within a quarter of a mile. Telegraph and good mail facilities...

Halsey Wood's brother, Reverend Alonzo Wood, Sr. was among those who celebrated the first Holy Eucharist in 1885, and his family served the church for over seventy five years. He married his brother to Florence, daughter of Mrs. and Mrs. Hemsley, at St. John the Evangelist on 19 November 1889, the first wedding celebrated there. His three sons, Alonzo Jr. Daniel and Edmund, officiated at the church, as did Reverend Alonzo Stewart. Subsequently, the Rt. Reverend Allen Brown, Bishop of Albany, ministered to the congregation, as did Reverend Leonard J. Sachs, and Reverend John C. Smith.

== Local impact ==
The cool summers of the Catskill mountains attracted wealthy, middle-class vacationers from New York, Philadelphia and other lowland towns and cities. When the railroad reached Tannersville in 1882, the area boomed as a summer resort for the elite.

As Field Horne in his history of Greene County noted, “A very different community of summer residents had its start at the same time...Tannersville came to be the center of the private parks, where wealthy and cultured people built substantial cottages in which to spend much of their summer in private surroundings.”

The new road up Philadelphia Hill stimulated the building of a small community of summer homes in the 1880s. Although a small farm house and one summer cottage, built in 1884, preceded the opening of the church, four more houses were completed before the end of the decade, including that of Fannie Hay Brand, who later married Reverend Alonzo Wood. While not part of a private community, Philadelphia Hill's houses share the late Victorian architecture characteristic of Onteora Park Historic District, Elka Park Historic District, Twilight Park Historic District and Santa Cruz Park (the latter two amalgamated into one in 1935), the private resorts established in the town of Hunter between 1882 and 1890.

== Current use ==
The church is used in the summer with regular services on Sundays in July and August.

The church hosts weddings, baptisms, and memorials. Classical instrumental and voice ensembles also use the church for occasional concerts and recordings. All visitors are welcome.

The church is located on Philadelphia Hill Road off County Route 16, 1.1 miles from the traffic light in the center of Tannersville, along the road signposted to Elka Park. The church celebrated its 125th anniversary in 2010 with Bishop William Love of Albany the celebrant.
