= William Clark House (Newark, New Jersey) =

Historic house in New Jersey, United States

- U.S. National Register of Historic Places
- New Jersey Register of Historic Places
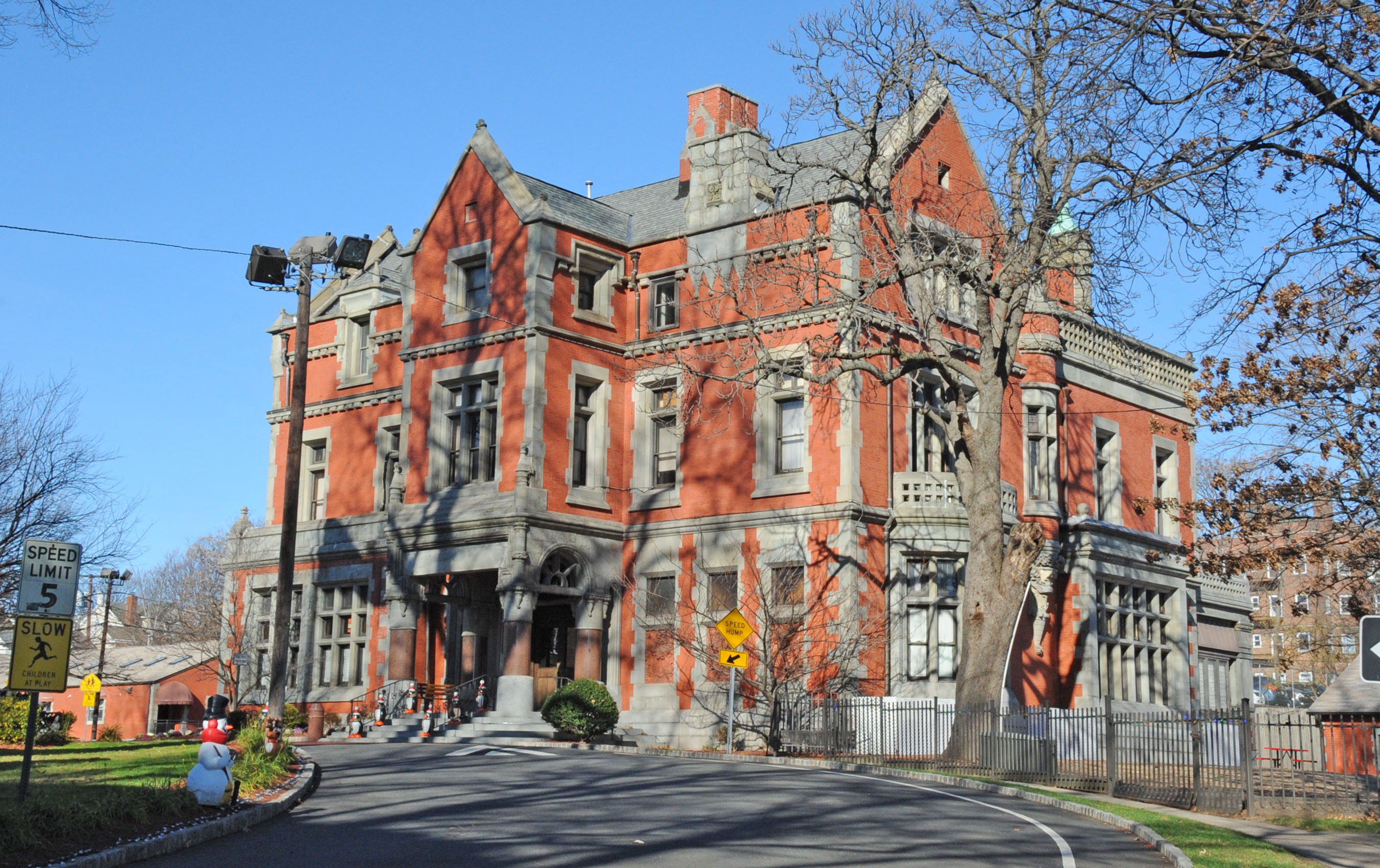

- Location within Essex County, New Jersey Location within New Jersey Location within the United States
- Location: 346 Mount Prospect Avenue, Newark, New Jersey
- Coordinates: 40°45′50″N 74°10′20″W
- Area: 2.5 acres (1.0 ha)
- Built: 1879
- Architect: William Halsey Wood
- Architectural style: Queen Anne
- NRHP reference No.: 77000863
- NJRHP No.: 1226

Significant dates
- Added to NRHP: November 10, 1977
- Designated NJRHP: May 27, 1977

The William Clark House, also known as the North Ward Center, is located in Newark, Essex County, New Jersey, United States. The house was built in 1879 at a cost of $200,000 and was added to the National Register of Historic Places on November 10, 1977. The house is a 28-room Queen Anne style designed by William Halsey Wood. The house was built for William Clark of the Clark Thread Company.

== See also ==
- National Register of Historic Places listings in Essex County, New Jersey
