= First Baptist Peddie Memorial Church =

Historic church in New Jersey, United States

- U.S. National Register of Historic Places
- New Jersey Register of Historic Places
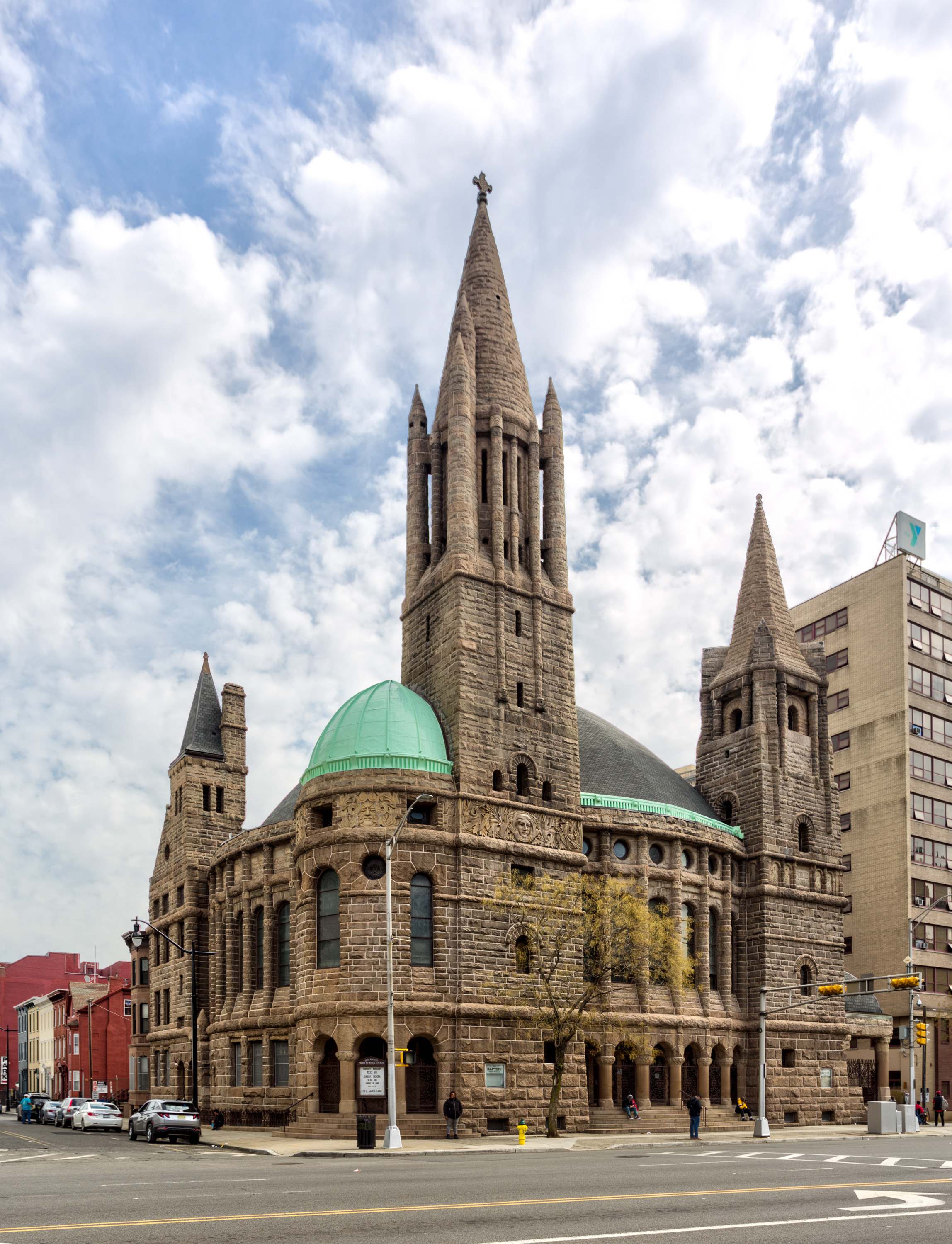

- Location within Essex County, New Jersey Location within New Jersey Location within the United States
- Location: Broad and Fulton Streets, Newark, New Jersey
- Coordinates: 40°44′30″N 74°10′7″W
- Area: 1 acre (0.40 ha)
- Built: 1888
- Architect: William Halsey Wood
- Architectural style: Byzantine-Romanesque
- NRHP reference No.: 72000774
- NJRHP No.
- Added to NRHP: October 30, 1972

First Baptist Peddie Memorial Church is a historic church at Broad and Fulton Streets in Newark, Essex County, New Jersey, United States.

It was built in 1888 and added to the National Register of Historic Places in 1972. Edward Morris Bowman was the church's first organist.

== See also ==
- National Register of Historic Places listings in Essex County, New Jersey
