= James Samuel Gallagher =

American politician

James Samuel Gallagher (1845-1907) was a member of the Wisconsin State Assembly in 1883 as well as a justice of the peace. He was a Democrat. Gallagher was born on May 21, 1845, in Braddock, Pennsylvania. He died on March 7, 1907, at his home in Gratiot, Wisconsin.
