= Arthur Smith (American poet) =

American poet (1948–2018)

- Born: Arthur Edwin Smith; April 17, 1948; Stockton, California, US
- Died: November 9, 2018 (aged 70); Knoxville, Tennessee, US
- Occupation: Poet
- Writing career
- Notable awards: Agnes Lynch Starrett Poetry Prize (1984); Pushcart Prize (1986, 1987)

Arthur Edwin Smith (April 17, 1948 – November 9, 2018) was an American poet whose work appeared in The New Yorker, "The Georgia Review," "Northwest Review," "Cutthroat: A Journal of the Arts," "Crazyhorse," "Southern Poetry Review," Hunger Mountain, and The Nation. He was a professor of English and Creative Writing at the University of Tennessee and lived in Knoxville, Tennessee with his three Keeshonden. He died on November 9, 2018, at the age of 70.

== Awards ==
- 1987 Pushcart Prize
- 1986 Pushcart Prize
- 1985 Norma Farber First Book Award, Poetry Society of America
- 1984 Agnes Lynch Starrett Poetry Prize
- 1981 Discovery/The Nation, the Joan Leiman Jacobson Poetry Prize

== Works ==
- "ARS POETICA", Enskyment
- Elegy on Independence Day. University of Pittsburgh Press. 1985. ISBN 978-0-8229-3513-1.
- Orders of Affection: Poems. Carnegie Mellon University Press. 1996. ISBN 978-0-88748-223-6.
- The Late World: Poems. Carnegie Mellon University Press. 2002. ISBN 978-0-88748-368-4.
- The Fortunate Era: Poems. Carnegie Mellon University Press. 2013. ISBN 978-0-88748-567-1.

=== Anthology ===
- The New Bread Loaf Anthology of Contemporary American Poetry, 1999.
- Don Johnson, ed. (1991). Hummers, Knucklers, and Slow Curves: Contemporary Baseball Poems. University of Illinois Press. ISBN 978-0-252-06183-7.
