= St. Paul's Church (Owego, New York) =

Historic church in New York, United States

- U.S. National Register of Historic Places
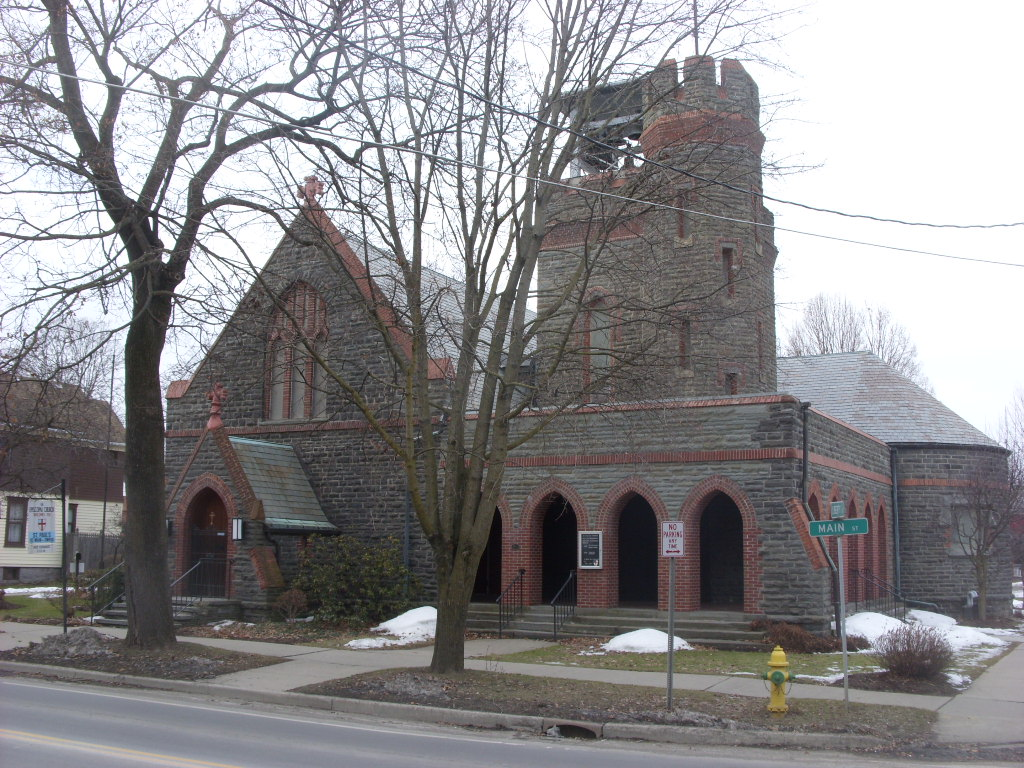
- St. Paul's Church, February 2009

- Location within New York Location within the United States
- Location: 117 Main St., Owego, New York
- Coordinates: 42°6′9″N 76°15′55″W
- Area: less than one acre
- Built: 1893-1894
- Architect: Wood, William Halsey; Cochran, John
- Architectural style: Late Victorian, Gothic
- MPS: Historic Churches of the Episcopal Diocese of Central New York MPS
- NRHP reference No.: 97001204
- Added to NRHP: October 16, 1997

St. Paul's Church is a historic Episcopal church located at Owego in Tioga County, New York. It is a High Victorian Gothic style structure built of rough cut bluestone trimmed with orange brick and terra cotta. The church is composed of a small entry vestibule, the gabled main block housing the nave and chancel, a shallow transept lying opposite a semicircular Lady Chapel, a tower, and an arcaded porch and a sacristy. It was designed by architect William Halsey Wood (1855–1897) and was built in 1893–1894.

It was listed on the National Register of Historic Places in 1997.
