= Maxine Scates =

American poet

- Born: Los Angeles, California, U.S.
- Education: California State University, Northridge (BA); University of Oregon (MFA)
- Occupation: Poet
- Children: William Cadbury
- Writing career
- Notable awards: Agnes Lynch Starrett Poetry Prize (1988); Oregon Book Award (1990); Pushcart Prize (2010, 2016)
- Website: maxinescates.com

Maxine Scates is an American poet.

== Life ==
Born and raised in Los Angeles, she received a B.A. in English from California State University, Northridge, where she studied with the poet Ann Stanford, whose selected poems Holding Our Own: The Selected Poems of Ann Stanford she later co-edited with another former student of Stanford's, the poet David Trinidad. She moved to Eugene, Oregon in 1973 to pursue an M.F.A. at the University of Oregon which she received in 1975.

She is the author of four books of poems, My Wilderness (forthcoming October 2021, University of Pittsburgh Press), Undone (New Issues 2011), Black Loam (Cherry Grove, 2005) which received the Lyre Prize and was a finalist for the Oregon Book Award for Poetry, and Toluca Street (University of Pittsburgh Press, 1989), which received the Agnes Lynch Starrett Poetry Prize, and subsequently the Oregon Book Award (Stafford/Hall Award) for Poetry.

She has taught throughout the state of Oregon, most recently at Reed College.

Her poems have appeared in such journals as Agni, The American Poetry Review, Antioch Review, Cave Wall, Crazyhorse, Hubbub, Ironwood, Massachusetts Review, Missouri Review, Ninth Letter, Ploughshares, Plume, Poetry, Prairie Schooner, The New England Review, The New Yorker, The Virginia Quarterly Review and ZYZZYVA and have received the Pushcart Prize in 2010 and 2016.

She lives in Eugene, Oregon with her husband, William Cadbury.

== Awards ==
- 1988 Agnes Lynch Starrett Poetry Prize, for Toluca Street
- 1990 Oregon Book Award for Poetry
- 2004 Lyre Prize for Black Loam
- 2010 Pushcart Prize
- MacDowell Colony Fellow, Oregon Arts Commission and Literary Arts Fellowship
- 2016 Pushcart Prize

== Works ==
- "What Do We Know and When Do We Know It?". Virginia Quarterly Review: 148–149. Fall 2008.
- "Mother's Closet", Poetry Foundation
- "Fan". Ploughshares. Winter 2007–2008. Archived from the original on January 28, 2016.
- Toluca Street. University of Pittsburgh Press. 1989. ISBN 978-0-8229-3623-7.
- Black Loam. Cherry Grove Collections. 2005. ISBN 978-1-932339-73-4.
- Undone. New Issues Poetry & Prose. 2011. ISBN 978-1-930974-99-9.
- My Wilderness. University of Pittsburgh Press. 2021. ISBN 978-0822966630.

== Editor ==
- Maxine Scates, David Trinidad, ed. (2001). Holding Our Own: The Selected Poems of Ann Stanford. Copper Canyon Press. ISBN 978-1-55659-158-7.
