= Edward Morris Bowman =

American organist and music educator (1848–1913)

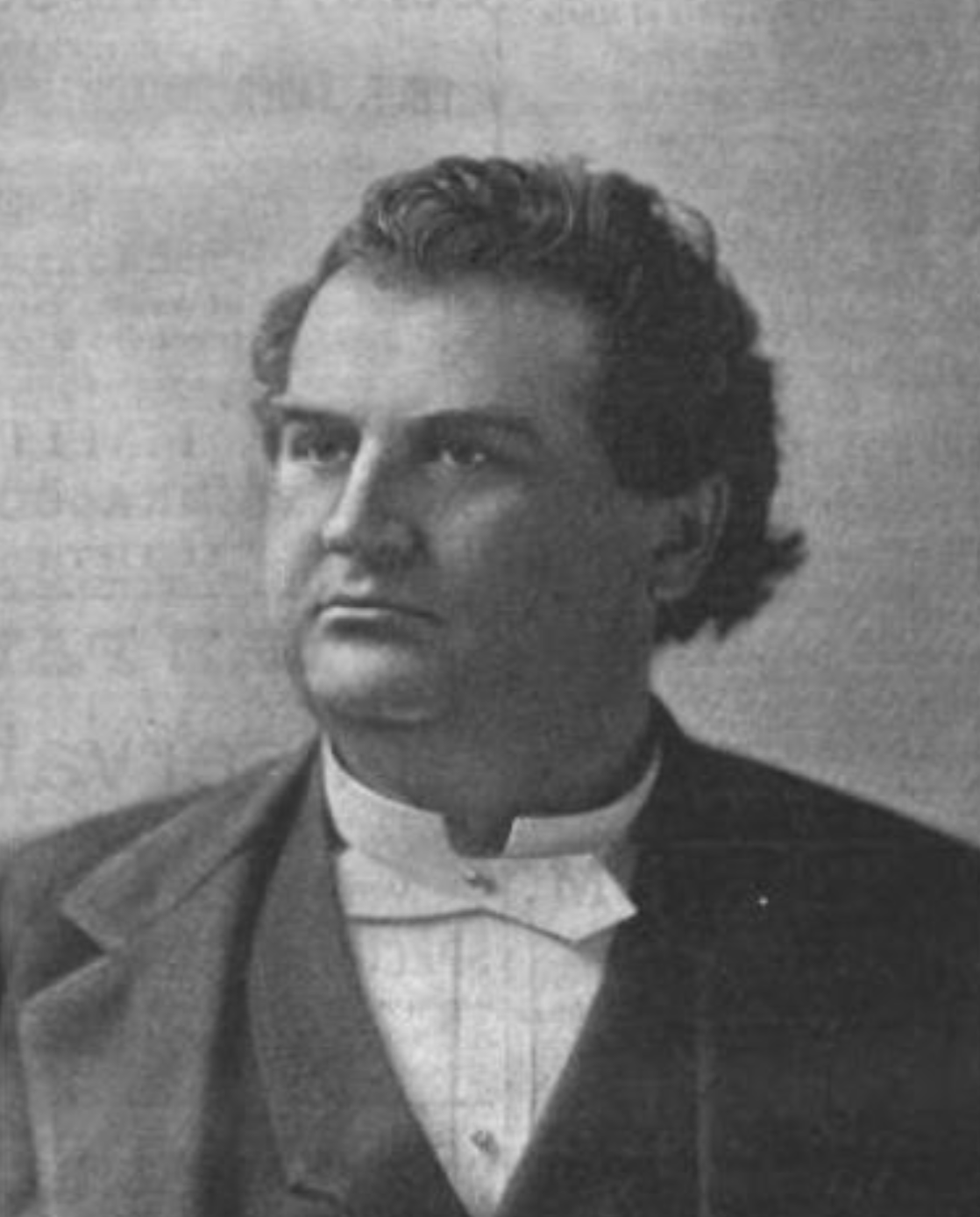
Bowman in 1891

Edward Morris Bowman (18 July 1848 – 27 August 1913) was an American organist, conductor, composer, and music educator. A native of Barnard, Vermont, he grew up in Barnard and Canton, New York. In the latter town he attended St. Lawrence University where he graduated in 1865. Prior to this he began working as an organist at the age of 14, and in 1866-1867 he was organist of Trinity Church in Manhattan. In New York he studied with William Mason and John Paul Morgan.

From 1867-1887 Bowman was a prominent organist and choirmaster in St. Louis, Missouri. During this period he twice took sabbaticals form his work in St. Louis to further his education with European master musicians. After leaving Missouri, he held organist and choirmaster positions at First Baptist Peddie Memorial Church, Newark, New Jersey (1887-1894), Baptist Temple, Brooklyn (1894-1906), and Calvary Church, Manhattan (1906-1913). In 1884 he founded the American College of Musicians. He was head of the music department at Vassar College from 1891-1895. He was elected president of the Music Teachers National Association three times, was a founding member of the American Guild of Organists, and was appointed an Associate of the Royal College of Organists.

== Early life in Vermont and New York ==
The son of Joseph Bowman and his wife Asenath Bowman (née Burroughs), Edward Morris Bowman was born in Barnard, Vermont on 18 July 1848. (Note: The books The History of American Music (1925) and Biographies of Celebrated Organists of America (1908) give his date of birth as 18 July 1848. The Servanthood of Song: Music, Ministry, and the Church in the United States (2024) gives a contradictory year of 1843, and his obituary in the New-York Tribune gives the year as 1842. However, primary documents all match the 1848 year; including entries in the New York, New York, U.S., Index to Death Certificates, 1862-1948 and the U.S., Passport Applications, 1795-1925. The 1860 United States Federal Census, which includes the names of both of his parents, states that he was 11 years old at the time of the census in June 1860 just a month before his 12th birthday. The 1842 and 1843 years do not match any primary sources.) He was a descendant of Nathaniel Bowman on his father's side, and Richard Warren and Elizabeth Tilley on his mother's side. As a boy he learned to read music in the singing school operated by Moses Cheney (1776-1856), and began piano lessons at the age of ten.

At the time of the 1860 United States census, Bowman was living with his family in Canton, New York. He began working as an organist at the age 14. In 1865 he graduated from St. Lawrence University in Canton. He served as organist and choirmaster at Trinity Church in Manhattan in 1866-1867. He studied music in New York with William Mason (piano) and John Paul Morgan (organ).

== St. Louis musician and studies in Europe ==
In 1867 Bowman moved to St. Louis, Missouri where he married Mary Elizabeth Jones on 23 June 1870. In St. Louis he served as organist at Union Methodist Church (located at 104 Locust Street) from 1867-1869, and Second Presbyterian Church (SPC) from 1870-1872. From 1872-1874 he went to Europe to further his music education. He studied first in Berlin with Franz Bendel (piano), August Haupt (organ), and Eduard Rohde (organ). After completing his studies in Germany he traveled to Rome where he was able to spend several hours with Franz Liszt who listened to him play and giving him feedback. From there he went to Paris where he studied under Édouard Batiste.

Upon his return to the United States in 1874, Bowman resumed his post at SPC where he remained until 1877 when he became organist and choirmaster at St. Louis's Second Baptist Church (SBC). Aside from his sojourn in Europe, he was a prominent music educator, organist, and conductor in St. Louis from 1867-1887. During this period he wrote the influential music theory textbook Manual of Music Theory which was largely based on the work of Carl Friedrich Weitzmann and was published in New York in 1877. In 1881 he took another trip to Europe where he pursued further studies in Paris with Alexandre Guilmant and in London with Frederick Bridge, George Alexander Macfarren, and Edmund Hart Turpin. He was made an Associate of the Royal College of Organists.

== Later life and career ==
Bowman remained the organist and choirmaster at SBC until his resignation in 1887. In 1884 he founded the American College of Musicians, and served as its first president until 1893 when he was succeeded by Albert Ross Parsons. He left St. Louis in 1887 to become the organist and choirmaster at First Baptist Peddie Memorial Church in Newark, New Jersey. He held that post until 1894; during which time he concurrently served as the head of the music department at Vassar College from 1891–1895. In 1896 he was a founding member of the American Guild of Organists.

In 1894 he became the organist and choirmaster at Baptist Temple in Brooklyn where he founded a large chorus and orchestra. He remained there until May 1906 when he left to found the choir at Calvary Church in Manhattan. He remained the organist and choirmaster at Calvary Church until his death.

In 1904 Bowman returned to St. Louis to give two organ recitals at Festival Hall as part of the Louisiana Purchase Exposition. He also taught piano and organ in New York out of a studio in Steinway Hall. His notable students included concert pianist and composer Lolita Cabrera Gainsborg and organist and composer Anice Terhune. He served multiple terms as president of the Music Teachers National Association; elected to the post three times for terms in 1883–1884, 1893–1894, and 1905.

Bowman died at his home in Flatbush in New York City on 27 August 1913. When his wife Mary died in 1922, The Musical Courier said that she was an invaluable assistant to her husband, and attended all of his music rehearsals, performances, recitals, and church services. Their daughter was the contralto Bessie Bowman Estey.

== Composer ==
Bowman composed the music to the Christian hymns "Our Father in heaven we hallow Thy Name", "There is a happy land", and "We have heard the joyful sound". He also wrote and published songs, including "Bonnie Annie Drew" and "Sky Lark" among others.

== Notes and references ==
=== Bibliography ===
- Benjamin, William Howard (1908). "Edward Morris Bowman". Biographies of Celebrated Organists of America. Benjamin Publishing Company.
- Dees, Pamela Y. (2002). A Guide to Piano Music by Women Composers, Volume One, Composers Born Before 1900. Bloomsbury Publishing. ISBN 9780313017032.
- Elson, Louis C. (1925). The History of American Music. Macmillan Company.
- McDaniel, Stanley R. (2024). Servanthood of Song: Music, Ministry, and the Church in the United States. Cascade Books. ISBN 9781666755930.
- Pazdírek, Franz (1967). Universal-Handbuch Der Musikliteratur: The Universal Handbook of Musical Literature. Manuel Universel de la Littérature Musicale. Vol. 2. F. Knuf.
- Pratt, Waldo Selden (1920). American Music and Musicians. Theodore Presser Company.
