= Wickliffe Presbyterian Church =

Historic church in New Jersey, United States

- U.S. National Register of Historic Places
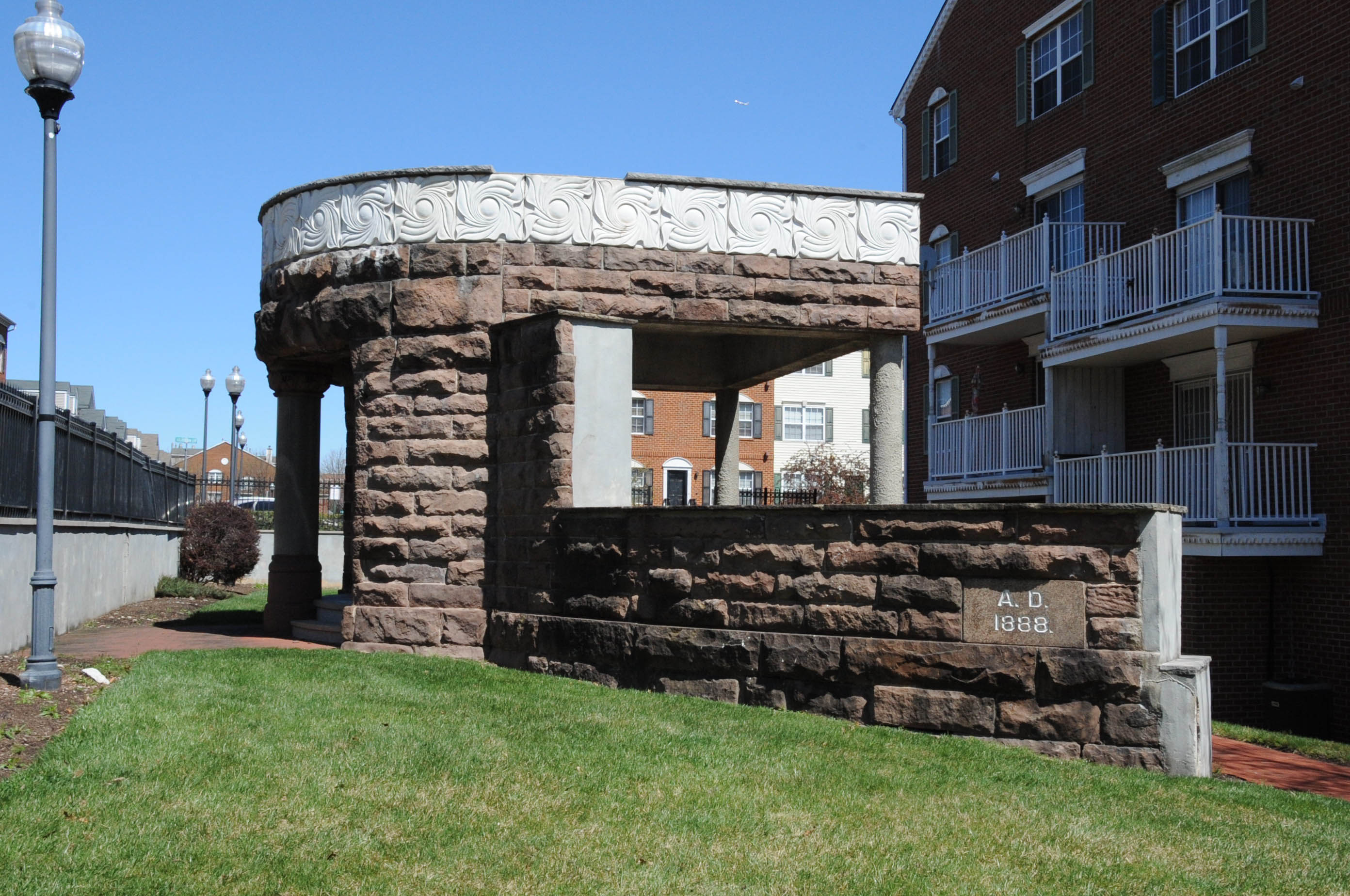
- Remnants of the church

- Location within Essex County, New Jersey Location within New Jersey Location within the United States
- Location: 111 13th Avenue, Newark, New Jersey
- Coordinates: 40°44′19″N 74°11′5″W
- Area: 0.2 acres (0.081 ha)
- Built: 1889
- Architect: William Halsey Wood
- Architectural style: Richardsonian Romanesque
- NRHP reference No.: 78001761
- Added to NRHP: May 22, 1978

Wickliffe Presbyterian Church is a historic church at 111 13th Avenue in Newark, Essex County, New Jersey, United States. It is in Richardsonian Romanesque style and was designed by William Halsey Wood. It was built in 1889.

The 13th Avenue church replaced a church used previously by the congregation at 2 Wickliffe Street, in Newark. Wickliffe Street intersects 13th Avenue a block or two away.

The church was added to the National Register of Historic Places in 1978.

The church was demolished for the University Heights Houses. It was located on 13th Ave near Boston and Richmond Streets. What remains is a facade with two placards of the Historical significance, one dated 1992.

== See also ==
- National Register of Historic Places listings in Essex County, New Jersey
