= Michael McGriff =

American poet

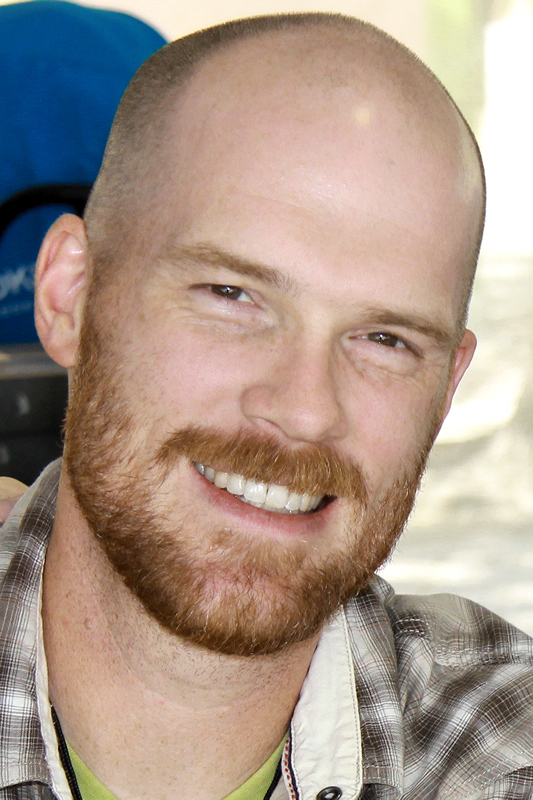
- McGriff at the 2014 Texas Book Festival
- Born: Coos Bay, Oregon, U.S.
- Occupation: Poet
- Writing career
- Notable awards: Agnes Lynch Starrett Poetry Prize (2007)

Michael McGriff is an American poet.

== Life ==
McGriff was born and raised in Coos Bay, Oregon. His work has appeared in Slate, Field, AGNI, The Believer, Missouri Review, and Poetry. He is the founding editor of Tavern Books, a publishing house dedicated to poetry in translation and the revival of out-of-print books.

McGriff's book Home Burial (Copper Canyon Press, 2012) chronicles the dissolution of a people and their landscape - the coastal Pacific Northwest. His most recent book of poetry, Early Hour, is a book length sequence inspired by German Expressionist Karl Hofer's 1935 painting (Fruhe Stunde) of the same name.

McGriff currently teaches creative writing at the University of Idaho.

== Awards ==
- Stegner Fellowship from Stanford University
- Ruth Lilly Fellowship from The Poetry Foundation
- Michener Fellowship from the University of Texas at Austin
- 2007 Agnes Lynch Starrett Poetry Prize, for Dismantling the Hills
- 2010 Lannan Literary Fellowship
- 2013 Levis Reading Prize from Virginia Commonwealth University

== Works ==
- "Year of the Rat", Courtland Review, Spring 2009
- Choke. Traprock Books. 2006. ISBN 978-0-9767411-2-1.
- Dismantling the Hills. University of Pittsburgh Press. 2008. ISBN 978-0-8229-6007-2.
- Home Burial (Copper Canyon Press, 2012)
- Black Postcards (Willow Springs Books, 2017)
- Early Hour (Copper Canyon Press, 2017)
- Eternal Sentences (The University of Arkansas Press, 2021)
- Angel Sharpening Its Beak (Carnegie Mellon University Press Poetry Series, 2025)

=== Anthology ===
- Larry Smith, ed. (2005). Family matters: poems of our families. Bottom Dog Press. ISBN 978-0-933087-95-8.

=== Translation ===
- "From July ’90", Tomas Tranströmer, AGNI 65, 2007
- "Landscape with Suns", Tomas Tranströmer, AGNI 65, 2007
- Tomas Tranströmer (2009). The Sorrow Gondola. Translator Michael McGriff. Green Integer. ISBN 978-1-933382-44-9.
