= Braddock, Pennsylvania =

Borough in Pennsylvania, US

- Borough
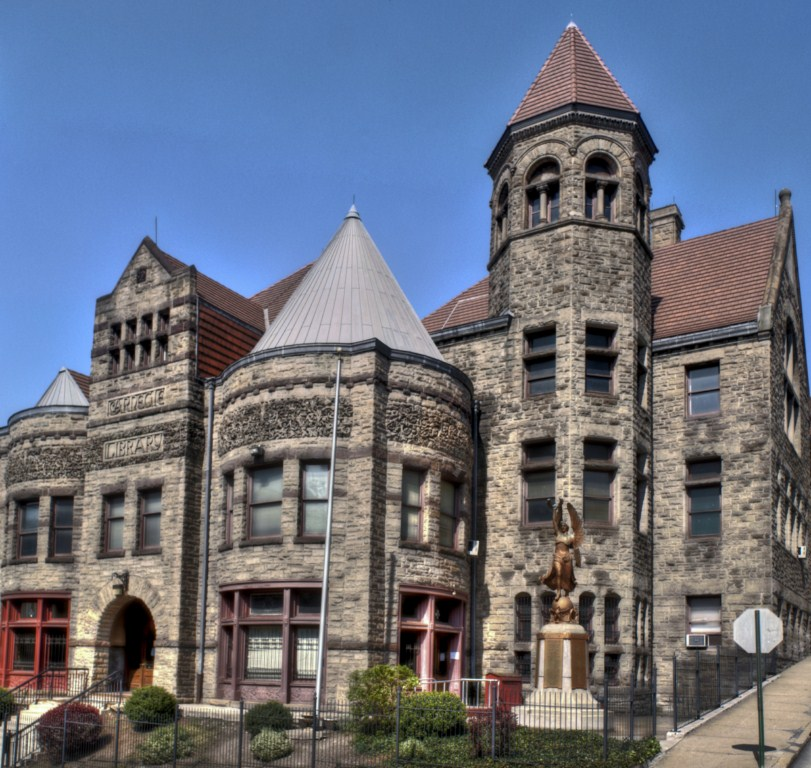
- Braddock Carnegie Library, May 2010

- Logo
- Interactive map of Braddock, Pennsylvania
- Location within Pennsylvania Location within the United States
- Coordinates: 40°24′13″N 79°52′7″W
- Country: United States
- State: Pennsylvania
- County: Allegheny
- Settled: 1742
- Incorporated: June 8, 1867

Government
  - Type: Borough Council
  - Mayor: Delia Lennon-Winstead
  - Borough Council President: LuJuan Reeves

Area
  - Total: 0.66 sq mi (1.71 km^{2})
  - Land: 0.56 sq mi (1.46 km^{2})
  - Water: 0.097 sq mi (0.25 km^{2})
- Elevation: 764 ft (233 m)

Population (2020)
  - Total: 1,721
  - Density: 3,055.8/sq mi (1,179.85/km^{2})
- Time zone: UTC-5 (EST)
  - Summer (DST): UTC-4 (EDT)
- ZIP Code: 15104
- Area codes: 412, 878
- FIPS code: 42-07992
- School District: Woodland Hills
- Website: braddockborough.com

Braddock is a borough in Allegheny County, Pennsylvania, United States. It is located in the eastern suburbs of Pittsburgh, 10 miles (16 km) upstream from the mouth of the Monongahela River. The population was 1,721 as of the 2020 census, a 91.8% decline since its peak of 20,879 in 1920.

== History ==
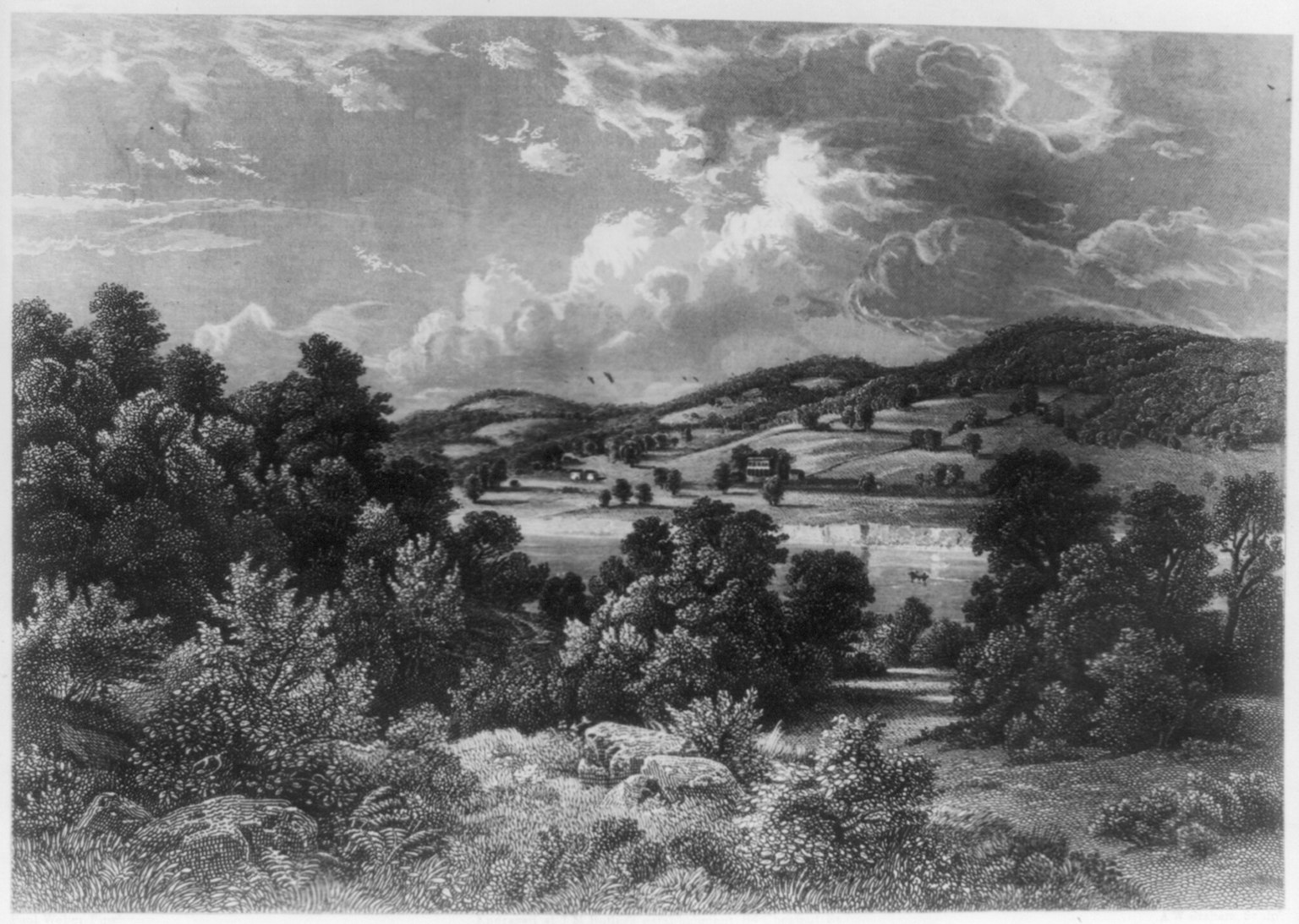
Braddock's Field

Braddock is named for General Edward Braddock (1695–1755), commander of American colonial forces at the start of the French and Indian War. The Braddock Expedition to capture Fort Duquesne (modern day Pittsburgh) from the French led to the British general's own fatal wounding and a sound defeat of his troops after crossing the Monongahela River on July 9, 1755. This battle, now called the Battle of the Monongahela, was a key event at the beginning of the French and Indian War.

The area surrounding Braddock's Field was originally inhabited by the Lenape, ruled by Queen Alliquippa.

In 1742, John Fraser and his family established the area at the mouth of Turtle Creek as the first permanent English settlement west of the Allegheny Mountains. George Washington visited the area in 1753–1754. It was the site of Braddock's Defeat on July 9, 1755.

Braddock's first industrial facility, a barrel plant, opened in 1850. The borough was incorporated on June 8, 1867. The town's industrial economy began in 1873, when Andrew Carnegie built the Edgar Thomson Steel Works on the historic site of Braddock's Field in what is now North Braddock, Pennsylvania. This was one of the first American steel mills which used the Bessemer process. The mill is still in operation as a part of the United States Steel Corporation. This era of the town's history is depicted in Thomas Bell's novel Out of This Furnace.

Braddock is also the location of the first of Andrew Carnegie's 1,679 (some sources list 1,689) public libraries in the United States, designed by William Halsey Wood of Newark, New Jersey, and dedicated on March 30, 1889. The Carnegie Free Library of Braddock included a tunnel entrance for Carnegie's millworkers to enter a bathhouse in the basement to clean up before entering the facilities (which originally included billiard tables). An addition in 1893, by Longfellow, Alden and Harlow (Boston & Pittsburgh, successors to Henry Hobson Richardson), added a swimming pool, indoor basketball court, and 964-seat music hall that included a Votey pipe organ. The building was rescued from demolition in 1978 by the Braddock's Field Historical Society, and is still in use as a public library. The bathhouse has recently been converted to a pottery studio; the music hall underwent extensive restoration and musical performances will be presented in 2025.

During the early 1900s many immigrants settled in Braddock, primarily from Croatia, Slovenia, and Hungary.

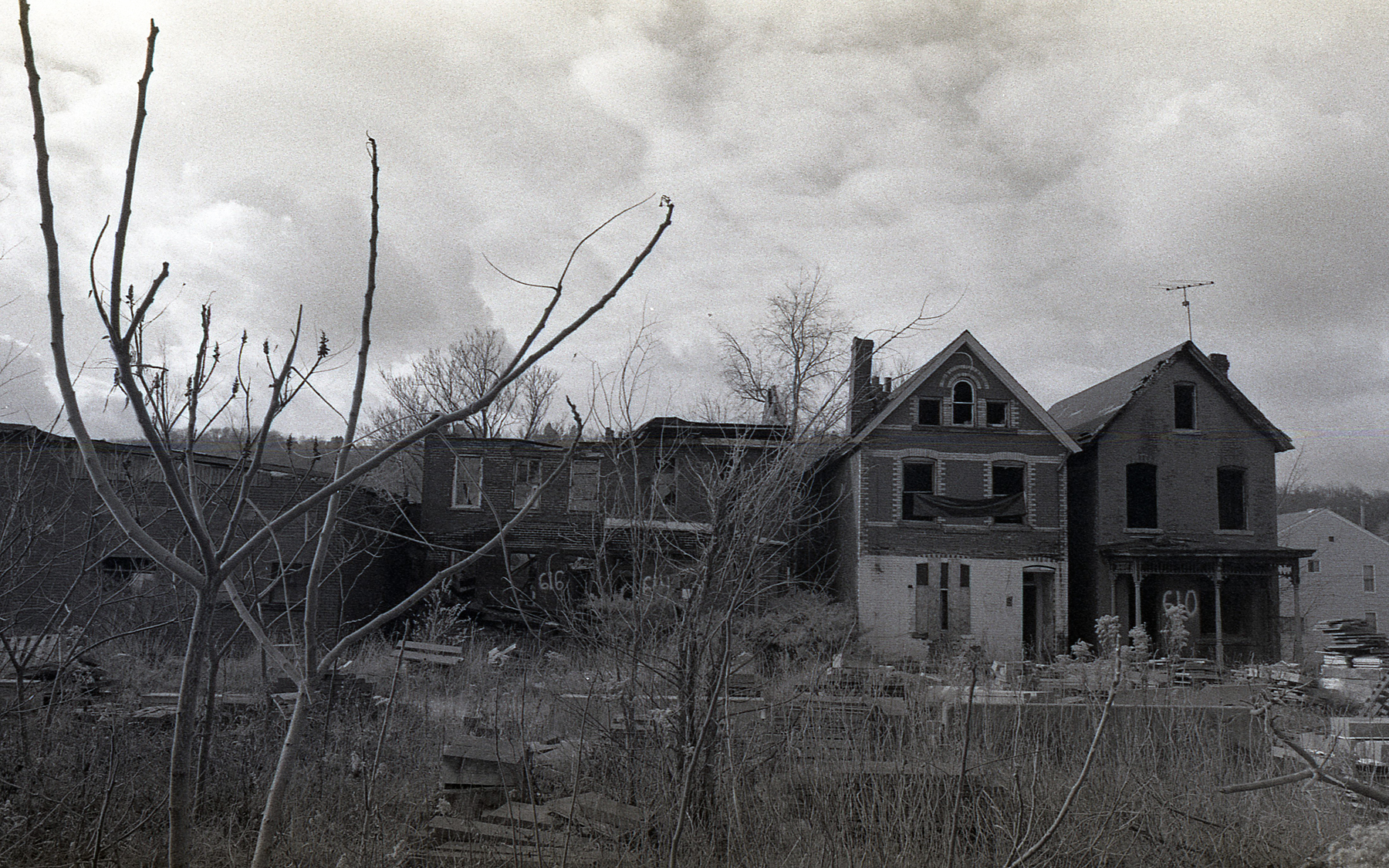
Condemned houses in Braddock, 2009

Braddock lost its importance with the collapse of the steel industry in the United States in the 1970s and 1980s. This coincided with the crack cocaine epidemic of the early 1980s, and the combination of the two woes nearly destroyed the community. In 1988, Braddock was designated a financially distressed municipality under Act 47. The entire water distribution system was rebuilt in 1990-1991 at a cost of $4.7 million, resulting in a fine system where only 5% of piped water is deemed "unaccounted-for". As of the early 2020s, Braddock's population is approximately 90% reduced from a peak of about 20,000 in the 1920s. In July 2023, the city officially exited Act 47 status.

John Fetterman, mayor of Braddock from 2006 until his 2019 inauguration as Lieutenant Governor of Pennsylvania, launched a campaign to attract new residents to the area from the artistic and creative communities. He also initiated various revitalization efforts, including the nonprofit organization Braddock Redux. In the 2022 midterms, Fetterman became the first US Senator from Pennsylvania to hail from Braddock, and the second member of Congress, after Matthew A. Dunn.

Since 1974, Braddock resident Tony Buba has made many films. One of his earlier films is Struggles in Steel. In September 2010, the IFC and Sundance television channels showed the film Ready to Work: Portraits of Braddock, produced by the Levi Strauss corporation. This film interviews many of the local residents and shows their efforts to revitalize the town.

== Geography ==
According to the U.S. Census Bureau, the borough has a total area of 0.6 square miles (1.6 km^{2}), 0.6 square miles (1.6 km^{2}) of which is land and 0.1 square miles (0.26 km^{2}) (13.85%) of which is water. Its average elevation is 764 ft (233 m) above sea level.

Braddock has two land borders, with North Braddock from the north to the southeast, and Rankin to the northwest. Across the Monongahela River to the south, Braddock is adjacent to Whitaker and West Mifflin.

== Demographics ==
Historical population
Census	Pop.	Note	%±
1870	1,290		—
1880	3,310		156.6%
1890	8,561		158.6%
1900	15,654		82.9%
1910	19,357		23.7%
1920	20,879		7.9%
1930	19,329		−7.4%
1940	18,326		−5.2%
1950	16,488		−10.0%
1960	12,337		−25.2%
1970	8,795		−28.7%
1980	5,634		−35.9%
1990	4,682		−16.9%
2000	2,912		−37.8%
2010	2,159		−25.9%
2020	1,721		−20.3%

=== 2020 census ===
Braddock borough, Pennsylvania – Racial and ethnic composition Note: the US Census treats Hispanic/Latino as an ethnic category. This table excludes Latinos from the racial categories and assigns them to a separate category. Hispanics/Latinos may be of any race.
Race / Ethnicity (NH = Non-Hispanic)	Pop 1980	Pop 1990	Pop 2000	Pop 2010	Pop 2020	% 1980	% 1990	% 2000	% 2010	% 2020
White alone (NH)	2,892	2,433	872	489	317	51.33%	51.96%	29.97%	22.65%	18.42%
Black or African American alone (NH)	2,641	2,165	1,910	1,555	1,219	46.88%	46.24%	65.64%	72.02%	70.83%
Native American or Alaska Native alone (NH)	0	20	4	14	5	0.00%	0.43%	0.14%	0.65%	0.29%
Asian alone (NH)	0	11	6	3	7	0.00%	0.23%	0.21%	0.14%	0.41%
Pacific Islander alone (NH)	N/A	N/A	0	4	1	N/A	N/A	N/A	0.19%	0.06%
Other race alone (NH)	18	9	9	5	13	0.32%	0.19%	0.31%	0.23%	0.76%
Mixed race or Multiracial (NH)	N/A	N/A	67	49	117	N/A	N/A	2.30%	2.27%	6.80%
Hispanic or Latino (any race)	83	44	44	40	42	1.47%	0.94%	1.51%	1.85%	2.44%
Total	5,634	4,682	2,910	2,159	1,721	100.00%	100.00%	100.00%	100.00%	100.00%

According to the American Community Survey in 2020, Braddock has an employment rate of 34.2%, a median household income of $23,050, 3.7% of the population has no health care coverage, with 10.7% of the population possessing a Bachelor's degree or higher.

== Government ==
Presidential Elections Results
Year	Republican	Democratic	Third Parties
2020	9% 82	89% 784	0.6% 6
2016	9% 82	89% 822	2% 18
2012	7% 66	93% 933	1% 4

The borough is represented by the Pennsylvania State Senate's 45th district, the Pennsylvania House of Representatives' 34th district, and Pennsylvania's 12th congressional district in the U.S. House of Representatives.

== Education ==
Woodland Hills School District is the local school district.

The comprehensive high school for the district is Woodland Hills High School.

== Media ==
- The 2010 film One for the Money used the shuttered University of Pittsburgh Medical Center facility in Braddock as the "Trenton Police Headquarters".
- Out of the Furnace, a film starring Christian Bale released in 2013, was shot in Braddock.
- Parts of the 1996 TV film The Christmas Tree were shot in the Carnegie Free Library of Braddock.
- George A. Romero's 1977 film Martin was filmed in Braddock.

== Notable people ==
- Thomas Bell – novelist; set Out of This Furnace in Braddock
- Andrew J. Boyle – U.S. Army lieutenant general
- Tony Buba – filmmaker
- John Clayton – sportswriter and NFL analyst
- Henry Clay Drexler – recipient of the Navy Cross and Medal of Honor
- Matthew A. Dunn – former member of the United States House of Representatives
- John Fetterman – former mayor of Braddock, former Lieutenant Governor of Pennsylvania, and United States Senator from Pennsylvania
- Gisele Barreto Fetterman – former Second Lady of Pennsylvania
- LaToya Ruby Frazier – artist; 2015 MacArthur Fellow
- James Samuel Gallagher – former member of the Wisconsin State Assembly
- Joseph M. Gaydos – former member of the United States House of Representatives
- Vernon Irvin – Chief Marketing Officer for XM Satellite Radio
- Captain Bill Jones – first superintendent of the Edgar Thompson Works under Andrew Carnegie
- Melville Kelly – former member of the United States House of Representatives; established the Braddock Leader newspaper
- Billy Knight – former Pittsburgh Panther and NBA player and executive
- Sean Lomax – professional whistler
- John Maisto – former ambassador to Venezuela, Nicaragua, and the Organization of American States
- Tom Major-Ball – music hall performer and father of British Prime Minister John Major
- Joseph A. McDonald – steel industry executive
- Art Pallan – radio celebrity
- George Peppard – lived and worked in Braddock as a radio announcer in his early career
- James L. Quinn – former member of the United States House of Representatives
- Frank S. Scott – first enlisted member of the United States armed forces to lose his life in an aircraft accident
- Lauren Tewes – actress best known for playing Cruise Director Julie McCoy on The Love Boat
- Leonard A. Funk Jr. - First Sergeant (1SG), 1st Battalion, 508th Parachute Infantry Regiment, Medal of Honor recipient World War II, Battle of the Bulge, Holzhiem Belgium.

== In popular culture ==
- A&P's first supermarket opened in Braddock in 1936.
- George A. Romero's 1978 horror film Martin takes place in Braddock and was largely filmed there.
- Levi Strauss & Co., the maker of Levi's jeans, chose the borough for its "youth" commercial campaign, which was televised in late 2010 and 2011.
- Thomas Bell's historical novel Out of This Furnace is set in Braddock during the 1890s to the 1930s.
- The 2022 feature film Dear Zoe is primarily set in Braddock.

== See also ==
- Braddock's Battlefield History Center
