= Cheryl Dumesnil =

American author, poet and editor

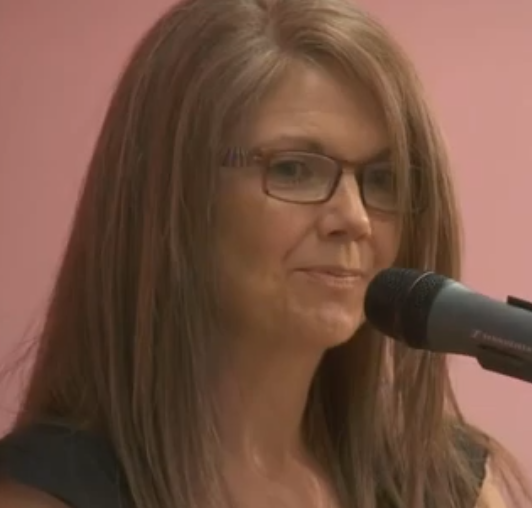
- Reading at the San Francisco Public Library in 2014
- Born: 1969 (age 56–57)
- Education: Syracuse University
- Writing career
- Genre: Poetry

Cheryl Dumesnil (born 1969) is an American author, poet and editor. She is a frequent contributor to The Huffington Post. Her poems and essays have appeared in Indiana Review, Barrow Street, Calyx, and Rattle.

Dumesnil was awarded the 2008 Agnes Lynch Starrett Poetry Prize for her first full-length book, In Praise of Falling.

Dumesnil received her MFA in creative writing from Syracuse University and taught at Santa Clara University from 1994 to 2001. She lives in the San Francisco Bay Area with her wife and two sons.

== Selected publications ==
=== Sample works ===
- "Bernal Heights", Verse Daily
- "Don't Ask Me". Cortland Review. Spring 2009.
- "In Praise of Falling", "Narrative"

=== Books ===
- In Praise of Falling. University of Pittsburgh Press. 2009. ISBN 978-0-8229-6041-6. (poetry)
- Love Song for Baby X: How I Stayed (Almost) Sane on the Rocky Road to Parenthood. Ig Publishing. 2013. (memoir)
- Showtime at the Ministry of Lost Causes. University of Pittsburgh Press. 2016. (poetry)
- What Is Left to Say. Glass Lyre Press. 2023. (poetry)

=== Editor ===
- Cheryl Dumesnil, ed. (2005). Hitched!: wedding stories from San Francisco City Hall. Thunder's Mouth Press. ISBN 978-1-56025-764-6.
- Kim Addonizio; Cheryl Dumesnil, eds. (2002). Dorothy Parker's Elbow: Tattoos on Writers, Writers on Tattoos. Diane Publishing. ISBN 978-0-7567-9159-9.
- Cheryl Dumesnil, Marika Lindholm, Katherine Shonk, Domenica Ruta, eds. (2020). We Got This! Solo Mom Stories of Grit, Heart, and Humor. SheWrites.
