= Braddock Carnegie Library =

Building in Braddock, Pennsylvania

- U.S. National Register of Historic Places
- U.S. National Historic Landmark
- Pittsburgh Landmark – PHLF
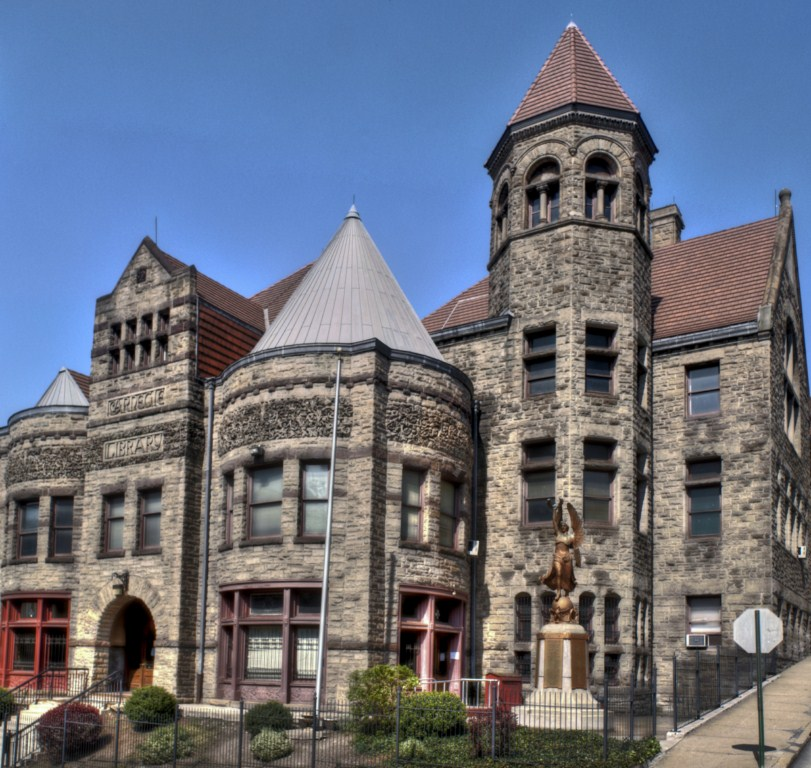
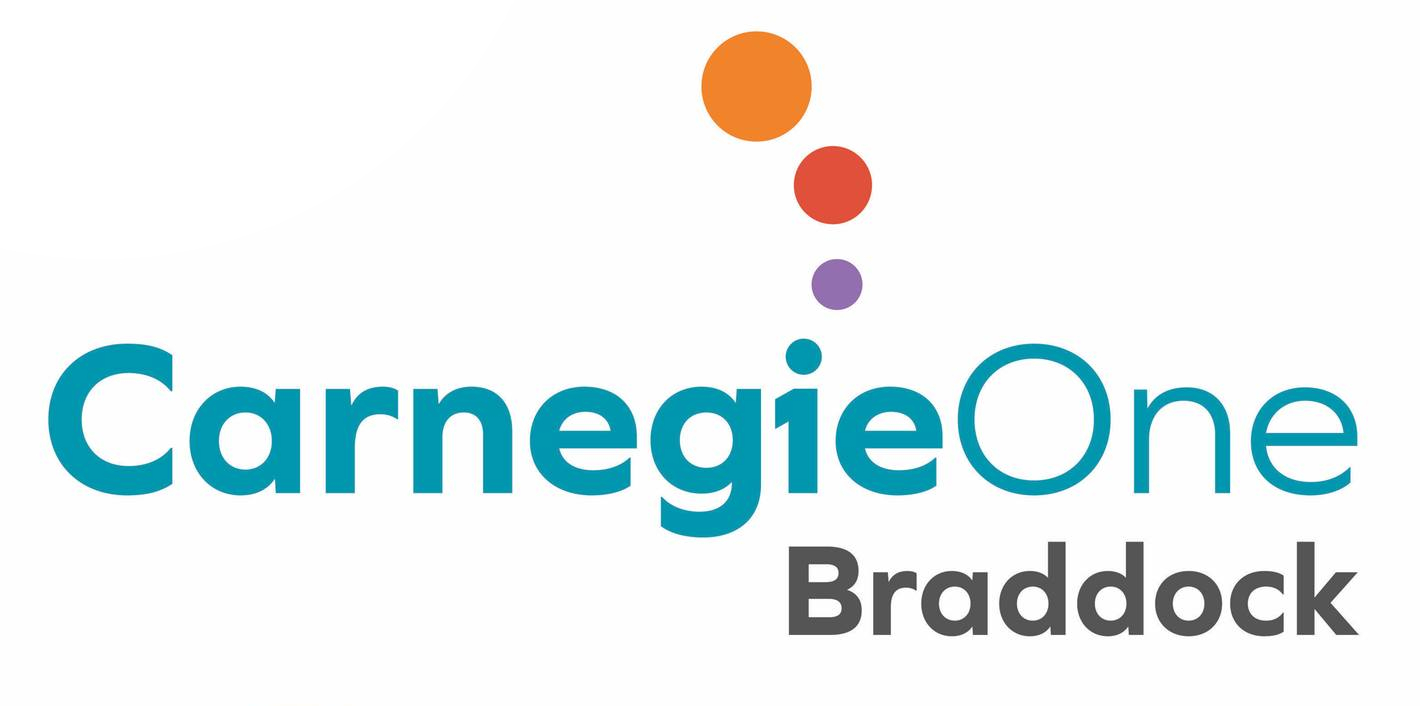
- Braddock Carnegie Library. Elements to the left, including the round turret, are William Halsey Wood's 1889 facade. The octagonal tower beside the turret, and elements to its right, reflect the Longfellow, Alden & Harlow addition from 1893. The Frank Vittor statue, "Winged Victory", a WWI memorial, was added to the courtyard ca. 1922. Logo of Carnegie One, the overseeing organization

- Location within Pennsylvania Location within the United States
- Location: 419 Library St., Braddock, Pennsylvania
- Coordinates: 40°24′6.73″N 79°51′55.53″W
- Area: 2 acres (0.81 ha)
- Built: 1888
- Architect: William Halsey Wood (1888); Longfellow, Alden & Harlow (1893 addition)
- Architectural style: Romanesque Revival, Richardsonian Romanesque
- NRHP reference No.: 73001585

Significant dates
- Added to NRHP: June 19, 1973
- Designated NHL: March 2, 2012
- Designated PHLF: 1976

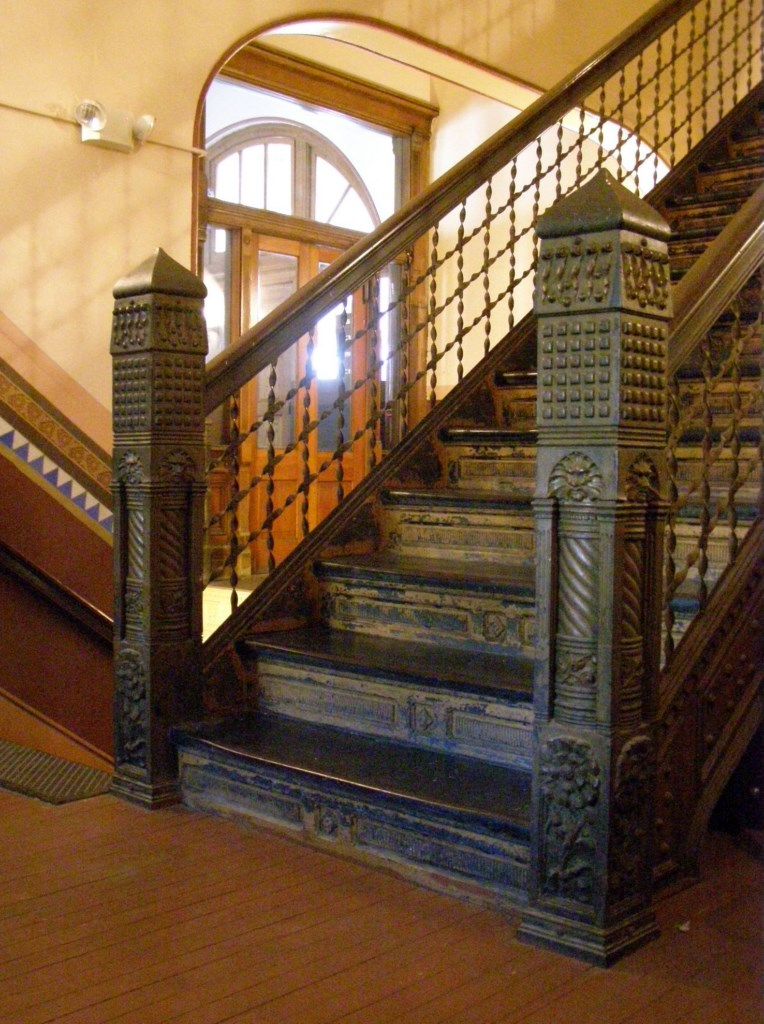
Neo-medieval cast iron newel posts flank the staircase of the original 1889 section of the building.

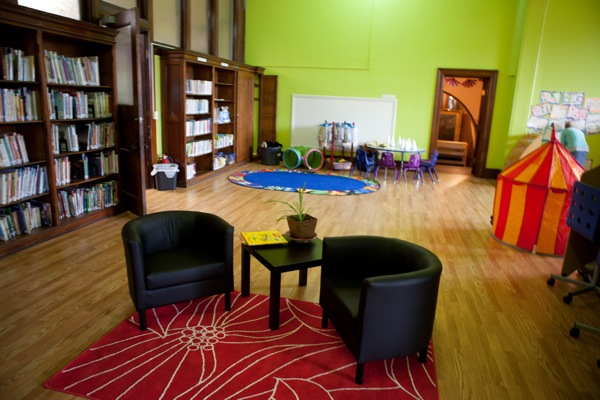
Children's section

The Braddock Carnegie Library in Braddock, Pennsylvania, is the first Carnegie Library in the United States. As such, the library was named a National Historic Landmark in 2012, following its listing on the National Register of Historic Places in 1973, and is on the Pittsburgh History and Landmarks Foundation's List of Historic Landmarks.

== Design, timeline and building ==
Designed by William Halsey Wood in eclectic medieval style, the library sits on property acquired by Andrew Carnegie with his wife in November, 1885, while existing evidence indicates that the design was approved in March, 1886. The building was dedicated by Carnegie in person at ceremonies on March 30, 1889. Circulation of books also began that month. An addition in more Richardson Romanesque style by Longfellow, Alden & Harlow (successors to HH Richardson) followed in 1893. (Another Halsey Wood design, Yaddo, presently an artists retreat/center in Saratoga Springs NY, is now also a National Historic Landmark.)

The Carnegie foundation provided a grant of $357,782 (equivalent to $12,820,522 in 2025) for its construction, a figure that is believed to reflect the total of the 1889 and 1893 structures. Like some of the other early Carnegie libraries, the building housed various recreational facilities for its users, including billiard tables on the first floor. (Carnegie was himself quite fond of billiards, which was quite fashionable at the time.) A bathhouse in the basement, originally accessed by a tunnel under the front entrance, provided Carnegie's millworkers with a place to shower (at a time when indoor plumbing was not the norm) before using the facilities. Now re-purposed as a pottery studio, the tiled walls and floor remain, suggesting its original purpose.

The 1893 addition approximately doubled the size of the building, and brought many further amenities not usually associated with a library, including a 964-seat Music Hall, a gymnasium, a swimming pool (beneath the Music hall), and a two-lane duckpin alley. At least in the early years, the athletic/recreational facilities were available to members of the "Carnegie Club" who paid a modest quarterly fee. Employees of any Carnegie-owned company received a 50% discount, which in 1903 amounted to $1/quarter (equivalent to $35.83 in 2025).

Three sets of decorative cast-iron panels with elements that include a shield and oak leaves are located below the first-floor bay-front windows of the Halsey Wood façade. While design does not appear to contain any parts of the Braddock or Carnegie family crests, the Braddock family name derives from the Old English 'broad oak' (English oak, Quercus robur) which has leaves similar to those in the panels. Two specimens of Q robur now flank the entryway steps.

== Demise ==
The Library remained in continuous use from 1889 to 1974, when neglect of the structure and lack of funds for repair, particularly of the roof, forced its closure. It was slated for demolition in the late 1970s when a group of residents, for whom the Library had represented a very positive influence in their youth, organized to save the structure. Calling themselves the Braddock's Field Historical Society and led by David Solomon, the last librarian, they purchased the building for $1 and took steps to secure the building and attend to the roof. (The Society's name refers to Braddock's Field, the colonial-era name of the area, relating to the Battle of the Monongahela fought on July 9, 1755, a few blocks away.)

== Renewal ==
Initially re-opening a single room as a children's library in 1983, with kerosene heat, the Society slowly but steadily re-occupied the building. The wood-paneled gym was restored in the early 1990s, and the roof was restored to its original terracotta appearance in 1998, along with the interior walls of the Music Hall, which had suffered substantial water damage from the leaking roof.

May 17, 2013: Re-decking the floor of the Music Hall continues with completion of the West Bank. Ponderosa Pine flooring is being replaced with more durable hickory, matching the original curved pattern but adding 6"/row.

Prototype restored original 1893 Thos. Kane Co. seat showing wooden spacers on either side of the backrest, to widen the seat. Currently, library services for adults have largely moved to the first floor, while a new Children's Library with dedicated staffing opened in March 2012 on the second floor.

In the basement space originally occupied by a bathhouse (for Carnegie's millworkers to clean up before entering upstairs spaces), the Bathhouse Ceramics Studio offers pottery lessons to the community.

Work on the Music Hall continued through 2025, with restoration of the floor and the original 1893 Thos. Kane Co. seats the main focus.

In October 2013, the Library inaugurated its Art Lending Collection, which enables patrons to borrow original artwork including life-sized puppets, as part of the 2013 Carnegie International Opening Weekend.

== In pop culture ==
The building has been used in several cinematic productions. The earliest known, Tony Buba's music video from ~1982 of Frenchy Burrito's cover of the Robert Johnson classic, "Terraplane Blues", was filmed in the gymnasium. Subsequently, it has served as a Brooklyn police station in the TV movie, The Bride in Black (1990), with Susan Lucci and David Soul; as an orphanage in the TV movie, The Christmas Tree (1996), with Julie Harris, which was Sally Field's directorial debut; and as (separately) a museum and gymnasium in Shelter (2010), with Julianne Moore and Jonathan Rhys-Meyers. In early Dec 2014, the Library was the location for filming sequences of Dr. Bennet Omalu's office in Concussion, with Will Smith and Albert Brooks.

The library's gym was turned into an auditorium for the Quantum Theater production of a one-man show, The Return of Benjamin Lay, in early 2025.

The library was featured in the 2025 documentary Free for All: The Public Library (dir. Dawn Logsdon and Lucie Faulknor).

== See also ==
- List of Carnegie libraries in Pennsylvania
- List of National Historic Landmarks in Pennsylvania
- National Register of Historic Places listings in Allegheny County, Pennsylvania

== Bibliography ==
- Floyd, Margaret Henderson (1994), Architecture After Richardson: Regionalism Before Modernism, Longfellow, Alden and Harlow in Boston and Pittsburgh., Chicago: University of Chicago Press, ISBN 0226254100
- Jones, Theodore (1997), Carnegie Libraries Across America: A Public Legacy, New York: John Wiley, Preservation Press, ISBN 0471144223
- Trustees, Braddock Carnegie Library (1903), Braddock Carnegie Library, New York & Pittsburg: Chasmar & Winchell
- Fleming, George Thornton (1922), History of Pittsburgh and environs: from prehistoric days to the beginning of the American revolution, Vol. 3, Pittsburgh: University of Pittsburgh, Digital Resource Library, pp. 737–740
