= Miriam Bird Greenberg =

American poet

Miriam Bird Greenberg is an American poet. She is author of four poetry collections: In the Volcano's Mouth, which won the 2015 Agnes Lynch Starrett Prize from the University of Pittsburgh Press, the chapbooks All night in the new country (Sixteen Rivers Press, 2013) and Pact-Blood, Fever Grass (Ricochet Editions, 2013); and the limited-edition letterpress artist book The Other World, which won the 2019 Center for Book Arts Chapbook Prize, designed in collaboration with Keith Graham. She was awarded a 2013 National Endowment for the Arts Literature Fellowship in poetry, a Stegner Fellowship from Stanford University, a fellowship from the Provincetown Fine Arts Work Center, and a 2010 Ruth Lilly Fellowship from The Poetry Foundation. Her poems have appeared in magazines such as Granta, Missouri Review, The Baffler, and Poetry.

Raised on a farm in rural northeast Texas, she received her Bachelor of Arts from the University of Pittsburgh and her Master of Fine Arts from the Michener Center for Writers at the University of Texas at Austin. She lives in Berkeley, California.

== Awards ==
- 2019 Dobie Paisano Fellowship
- 2017-2018 Singapore Creative Writer in Residence, National University of Singapore
- 2015 Agnes Lynch Starrett Prize
- 2013 National Endowment for the Arts Fellowship for Poetry
- 2012-2013 Provincetown Fine Arts Work Center fellowship
- 2010-2012 Wallace Stegner Fellowship for Poetry
- 2010 Ruth Lilly Fellowship
- 2002 Bucknell Seminar for Younger Poets fellow

== Works ==
Books

- 2016: In the Volcano's Mouth, University of Pittsburgh Press, Pittsburgh

Chapbooks

- 2019: The Other World, Center for Book Arts, New York
- 2013: All night in the new country, Sixteen Rivers Press, San Francisco
- 2013: Pact-Blood, Fever Grass, Ricochet Editions, Gold Line Press, Los Angeles

Poems Online

- “• [Whole towns like • horses turnt loose in the bardo of • …]”, Poetry, December 2019
- “• [I, in – in the long ago time before time began to be…]” and “• [In the other world, I’m told, I was born / meant /…]”, The Baffler, June 2019
- “• [In the other world we use other words, painting…]”, Poetry, March 2019
- "Of the Bell's Tongue", All the Little Wild Things, January 2019
- “Of Arcadia” and “Of Leather”, Granta, December 2018
- "Of Inheritance" and "Of Names to Disguise the Dead", Hunger Mountain, spring 2018
- “South from Kunming…” and “Down the mountain to NanSha…”, Cha: An Asian Literary Journal, March 2016
- "Incantation", Rove Poetry, 2016
- "Crossing the Bridge", Lambda Literary Spotlight, 2016
- "After I Die", The Baffler, 2016
- "Killing", The Colorado Review, 2014
- "I Passed Three Girls Killing a Goat", Poetry, November 2010
- "Brazilian Telephone", Poetry, November 2010 (Originally appeared in "Indiana Review" 30.2)
- "Remember", Smartish Pace 17
- "The Arrival", Killing the Buddha, August 2010
- "My Own History of Plagues", No Tell Motel, August 2010
- "Seasons Changing; Unanswered Questions", Diagram 8.2

Fiction Online

- "Of Humankind", The Fairy Tale Review, January 2019
