= Out of This Furnace =

Book by Thomas Bell

- Paperback Edition
- Author: Thomas Bell
- Language: English
- Genre: Novel, family saga
- Publisher: Little, Brown & University of Pittsburgh Press
- Publication date: 1941 (rediscovered & reissued 1976)
- Publication place: United States
- Media type: Print (Hardback & Paperback)
- Pages: 424
- ISBN: 0-8229-5273-4
- OCLC: 2610527
- Dewey Decimal: 813/.5/2
- LC Class: PZ3.B4153 Ou12 PS3503.E4388
- Preceded by: All Brides are Beautiful
- Followed by: Till I Come Back to You

Out of This Furnace is a historical novel and the best-known work of the American writer Thomas Bell. It was first published in 1941 by Little, Brown and Company.

== Description ==
The novel is set in Braddock, Pennsylvania, a steel town just east of Pittsburgh, along the Monongahela River. Based upon Bell's own family of Rusyn and Slovak immigrants, the story follows three generations of a family, starting with their migration in 1881 from Austria-Hungary to the United States, and finishing with World War II. The novel focuses on the steelworkers' attempt to unionize from 1889, the first Homestead strike (mentioned by Andrej on p. 38) through the big Homestead Steel Strike of 1892, the Great Steel Strike of 1919 right after World War I, and the events of the 1930s. Struggle, poverty, discrimination, and other forces beyond the characters' control tell the story of a troubled group of people. The novel's title refers to the central role of the steel mill in the family's life and in the history of the Pittsburgh region.

== Reissue ==
Long out of print, the novel was rediscovered in the 1970s by David P. Demarest, a professor of English at Carnegie Mellon University, who convinced director Frederick A. Hetzel at the University of Pittsburgh Press to reissue it in 1976. The book quickly became a regional bestseller. By the 1980s, however, it found an even larger readership on American college campuses. Out of This Furnace is regularly used as required reading in universities to introduce students to the history of immigration, industrialization, and the rise of trade unionism, as well as to the genre of the American working class novel.

== Adaptations ==
Out of This Furnace was first adapted as a three-part play by Julia Royall and Wilson Hutton for the Pittsburgh theatre company Iron Clad Agreement in 1977. The well-received production toured act by act to union halls in the mill towns where the novel was set: Braddock, Homestead, Donora, and Aliquippa.

The Iron Clad Agreement subsequently commissioned Andy Wolk to create a play in one part for more traditional theatre settings, which debuted in 1978. Unseam'd Shakespeare Company mounted successful revivals of this play in 2008 (as part of Pittsburgh's 250th anniversary) and 2011.
