= Elka Park Historic District =

Historic district in New York, United States

- U.S. National Register of Historic Places
- U.S. Historic district
- Location within New York Location within the United States
- Nearest city: Hunter, New York
- Coordinates: 42°9′19″N 74°10′5″W
- Area: 1,104 acres (447 ha)
- Built: 1890
- Architectural style: Stick/Eastlake, Queen Anne, Shingle Style
- NRHP reference No.: 93000399
- Added to NRHP: May 22, 1993

Elka Park Historic District is a national historic district located at Hunter in Greene County, New York. The district contains 31 contributing buildings, one contributing site, and one contributing structure. It is composed of a planned community of 20 seasonal houses founded and developed as small, late 19th century, summer residential enclave by wealthy German Americans. It includes 19 summer cottages, an observation tower, and a former community carriage house converted to residential use.

It was listed on the National Register of Historic Places in 1993.
