= Tony Buba =

American filmmaker

Anthony E. "Tony" Buba (born October 20, 1943) is an American filmmaker. He is primarily known for his documentaries about his hometown Braddock, Pennsylvania and the nearby Pittsburgh.

== Life ==
Tony Buba was born in 1943 as first child of Edward Buba († 1997) and Angeline Buba, née Gentile (1921–2017). His mother came to America in 1929 with her family from the Italian town Tursi. Buba grew up in Braddock, Pennsylvania with his younger brother Pasquale "Pat" Buba (1946–2018).

After high school Buba joined the United States National Guard and later worked in a steel mill. At the end of the 1960s he began to study. In 1971 he received his Bachelor of Arts in Psychology from Edinboro University. In 1976 he received his Master of Fine Arts in film studies at Ohio University.

During these years he produced his first documentary shorts, that portrayed his hometown Braddock and the structural change that came with the steel crisis of the 1970s.

== Career ==
After he had finished his studies, Buba also produced ads, image films and TV shows. Shortly afterwards the Buba brothers met George A. Romero, he worked on the sound of some of Romero's films. In 1978 the filmmaker also cast both brothers for small roles as drug dealers in Martin and bikers in Dawn of the Dead.

In 1988 he made his first full-length feature Lightning Over Braddock: A Rustbowl Fantasy, which was shown at the 39th Berlin International Film Festival in the Panorama section. Buba was also nominated at the 6th Independent Spirit Awards for Best First Feature two years later.

Buba founded his company Braddock Films in 1992. In 1994 he made his only feature film No Pets that was based on a short story by Jim Daniels.

The New York Anthology Film Archives presented a retrospective on his work in 2012 as a part of "Sometimes Cities: Urban America Beyond NYC“.

== Selected filmography ==
Director

- 1972: Free Film Today (Documentary short)
- 1973: To My Family (Documentary short)
- 1973: Thoughts (Documentary short)
- 1974: J. Roy – New & Used Furniture (Documentary short)
- 1975: Shutdown (Documentary short)
- 1976: Betty's Corner Cafe (Documentary short)
- 1979: Sweet Sal (Documentary short)
- 1980: Homage To A Milltown (Documentary short)
- 1980: Home Movies (Documentary short)
- 1980: Washing Walls With Mrs. G. (Documentary short)
- 1981: The Mill Hunk Herald (Documentary short)
- 1983: Peabody and Friends (Documentary short)
- 1983: Voices from a Steeltown (Documentary short)
- 1985: Birthday Party (Documentary short)
- 1985: Braddock Food Bank (Documentary short)
- 1988: Lightning Over Braddock: A Rustbowl Fantasy (Documentary)
- 1994: No Pets (Feature film)
- 1995: Small Differences (Documentary short)
- 1996: Struggles in Steel: The Fight for Equal Opportunity (Documentary)
- 1998: Fade Out (Documentary short)
- 1998: Unidentified Man (Documentary short)
- 2000: ECI (Documentary short)
- 2006: Expressway – A Work in Progress (Documentary short)
- 2007: Ode To A Steeltown (Documentary short)
- 2007: Year On The Throne (Documentary short)
- 2008: Stigmata (Documentary short)
- 2008: Voices Of Our Region (Documentary short)
- 2010: The Fall (Documentary short)
- 2013: Accordion Stories (Documentary)
- 2013: We Are Alive! The Fight to Save Braddock Hospital (Documentary, Co-director Tom Dubensky)
- 2014: Ghosts of Amistad: In the Footsteps of the Rebels (Documentary)

Actor

- 1978: Martin as Drug Dealer Shot By Police
- 1978: Dawn of the Dead as Motorcycle Raider
