= William Halsey Wood =

American architect

- Born: April 24, 1855; Dansville, New York
- Died: March 13, 1897 (aged 41); Philadelphia, Pennsylvania
- Occupation: Architect
- Buildings: First Baptist Peddie Memorial Church, Newark, New Jersey St. John's College, China St. Matthew's Cathedral, Laramie, Wyoming
- Projects: Cathedral of St. John the Divine, New York City

William Halsey Wood (April 24, 1855 – March 13, 1897) was an American architect.

== Early life ==
Wood was the youngest of four sons born to Daniel Halsey Wood and Hannah Lippincott Wood. Shortly after his birth in 1855, the family relocated from Dansville, New York to Newark, New Jersey, where Daniel Wood's company manufactured varnish. Family spiritual life centered around the House of Prayer, an Anglo-Catholic congregation where the children were introduced to ritualist liturgy and William became a member of the choir, eventually serving as its director.

Wood prepared for the architectural profession in a typical nineteenth-century pattern of practical experience and apprenticeship. During an unspecified time circa 1880, he is reported to have traveled to England and gained employment in the office of George Frederick Bodley, a leading figure in the High-church or Anglo-Catholic movement within the Anglican Communion. The Bodley connection is consistent with Wood's youthful experience at the House of Prayer, and that, with other family connections to the High Church party within Anglicanism, ultimately contributed to the character of Wood's own mature work.

On November 19, 1889, Wood married Florence Hemsley, a Philadelphian and member of the Church of St. James the Less in that city, one of the most prominent Anglo-Catholic congregations in America. The Woods bore three children: Emily (1890), William Halsey, Jr. (1892), and Alexander (1894).

== Career ==
From his practice in Newark, New Jersey, Wood focused on two characteristic building types of the late 19th century: large single-family residences and ecclesiastical designs principally for the Episcopal Church.

The young architect's earliest documented commissions are an 1878 house for his older brother D. Smith Wood and the William Clark House of 1879, both in Newark. There followed a variety of residential work, from a modest duplex for speculative investment to large suburban homes and urban townhouses. Three of his suburban homes were featured in Artistic Country-Seats by G. W. Sheldon, an 1886 publication that included work by McKim, Mead & White, Wilson Eyre and other notable turn-of-the-century designers. Wood's largest home, "Yaddo", was built in Saratoga Springs, New York for New York financier and philanthropist Spencer Trask and his wife Katrina Trask; Yaddo continues in use today as the home of a working colony of artists and writers.

Andrew Carnegie was also his client; the initial 1889 portion of the Carnegie Free Library of Braddock, Pennsylvania, the first of Carnegie's 1,679 public libraries in the US to open (1889) and the second to have been commissioned (1887), is Wood's design. It is believed that Wood met Carnegie through William Clark, also a Scottish immigrant. Wood's submission to the competition for Carnegie's larger library in Allegheny, Pennsylvania (now Pittsburgh's North Side), the first of his libraries in the United States to be commissioned (1886) and the second to open (1890), was very favorably received, but ultimately was not selected.

While the architect's clients and projects varied widely, church clients formed the largest part of Wood's practice, especially for his own denomination. From 1885 until his death Wood designed more than forty churches and parish buildings, all but four of them for Episcopal congregations.

The rural Church of St. John the Evangelist (1885), at Hunter/Tannersville, New York, for example, was designed for Wood's own family as a seasonal parish without resident clergy; Wood and his wife Florence Hemsley married there in 1889, with Wood's own brother Rev. Alonzo Lippincot Wood conducting the service and the bishop of Tennessee in attendance. The modest "Queen Anne" or "Eastlake" design, built of local granite boulders and wood-frame construction, expressed ecclesiological design principles promoted by the Oxford Movement.

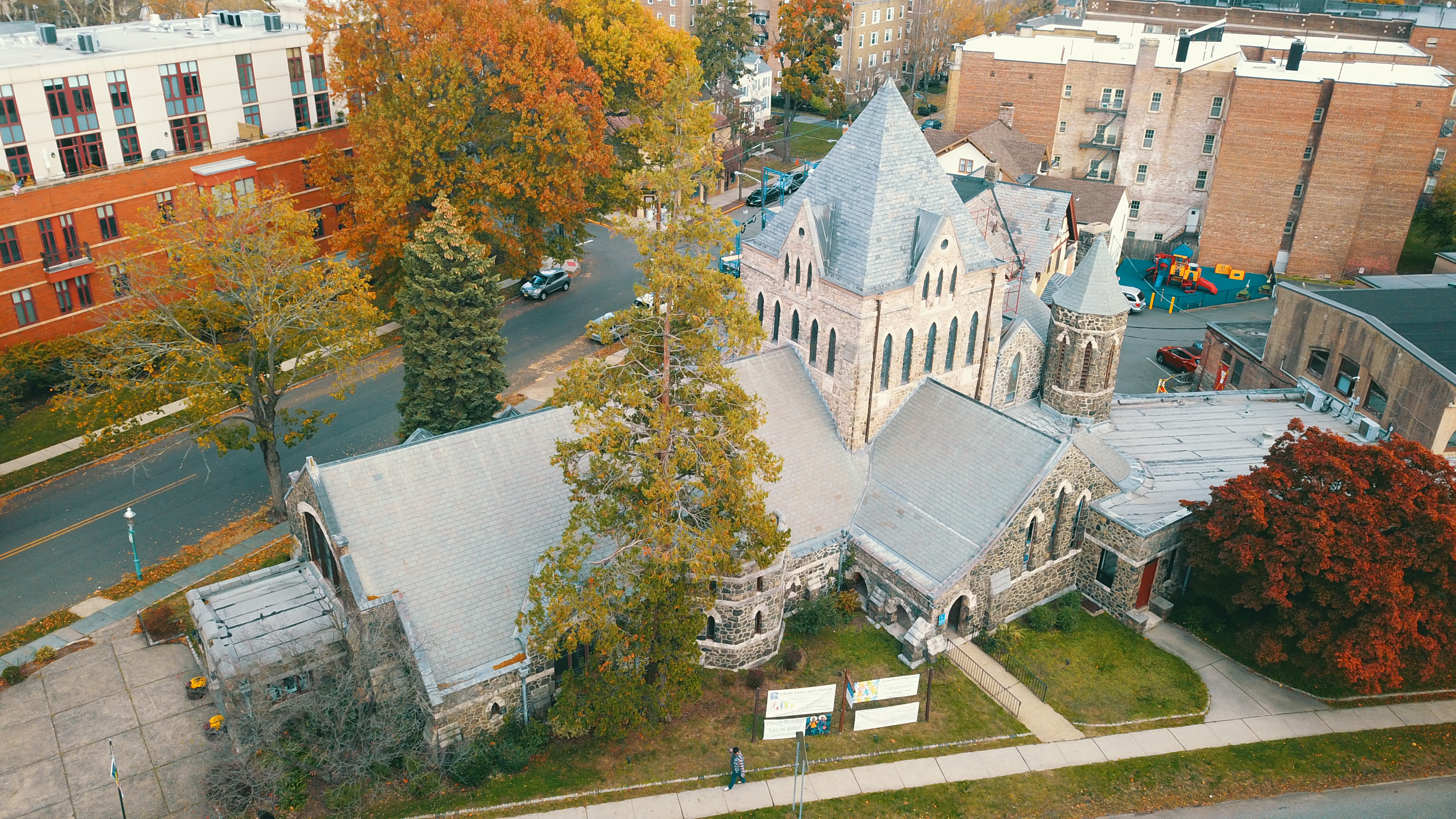
Wood's architecture can be seen in this drone shot of Christ Episcopal Church in Bloomfield & Glen Ridge.

Wood's masterpiece in New Jersey, still a vital congregation, is the First Baptist Peddie Memorial Church on Military Park in Newark (1888). Though often seen as being heavily influenced by Richardson, the massive two-towered building is really a nod toward twentieth century expressionism, its abstract masses seeming to burst from their bases like missiles from silos. There is nothing like it anywhere in the United States—National Romantic churches in Scandinavia are its closest contemporary designs. Also unique is its domed interior, designed to allow full immersion baptisms to occur while no less than three choirs sang in lofts directly above the pool. Its pulpit was also specially equipped for long Sunday sermons; Wood designed a press box adjacent to the elaborately carved aerie so that reporters could follow the preacher and file stories on the sermons for their Monday editions. The entire interior is wood paneled, and the carving is among the most elaborate in any church of its time. Only Richardson's Trinity Church in Boston matches its design in quality and material splendor.

At the opposite extreme, Wood entered and was one of four finalists in the competition for New York City's Cathedral of St. John the Divine, an unsuccessful proposal that would have been larger than any of its European counterparts. More typical examples of his work were for urban congregations in Newark, Passaic, Paterson and other communities in northeastern New Jersey and in New York City. One of these is Christ Episcopal Church in Bloomfield & Glen Ridge.

The geographic range of Wood's clientele was wide, including commissions in Alabama, Pennsylvania, Tennessee, Missouri and Wyoming. His most distant commission was for Saint John's University, Shanghai, China. Two of these commissions were cathedrals: St. Mary's at Memphis, Tennessee and St. Matthew's at Laramie, Wyoming. With few significant deviations, these churches were "Gothic Revival" or "Richardsonian Romanesque" in style and adhered closely to liturgical design principles promoted by the High Church party and its publishing organs The New-York Ecclesiologist and, later, The Churchman.

== Assessment ==
In March 1897, Wood died from tuberculosis at the Philadelphia home of his father-in-law, Alexander Hemsley. He was buried in the churchyard of St. James-the-Less, a traditional Anglo-Catholic congregation in keeping with his own churchmanship.

Wood died during an important transition in American architecture; a shift from the exuberance—some have said excesses—of nineteenth-century eclecticism to the functionally based perspectives of twentieth-century Modernism. Even during his own lifetime, Wood was seen as a participant in that process of transition. The next generation of architects and architectural critics, however, discounted his career as derivative, seeing only the historicist aspects of the architect's work, his reliance upon Medieval prototypes and imagery. Architect and preservationist James Marston Fitch, for example, dismissed Wood and other Richardsonians altogether: "...some of them, like Halsey Wood’s grotesque mimicry of H. H. Richardson’s Trinity, make one flinch at their awfulness".

One of the first to re-appraise Wood in a more positive light was the early 20th century medievalist, Ralph Adams Cram, himself a competitor for the Cathedral of St. John the Divine. Writing ten years after Wood's death, Cram observed "...he thought Gothic as instinctively as the best thirteenth-century master-mason of them all", and that "religious architecture staggered under the blow" when Wood died at the age of 41. Almost three decades later, Cram's enthusiasm was unabated, writing "For my own part I think Halsey Wood was potentially one of the greatest architects of modern times".

Another positive assessment came in 1936 from architectural critic and urban theorist Lewis Mumford, whose writings were instrumental in understanding the 1880s "as the seedbed of modern architecture". In "The Sky Line", his regular column in The New Yorker, Mumford linked Wood with H. H. Richardson and others who had lain the groundwork for Modernism.

== Selected works ==
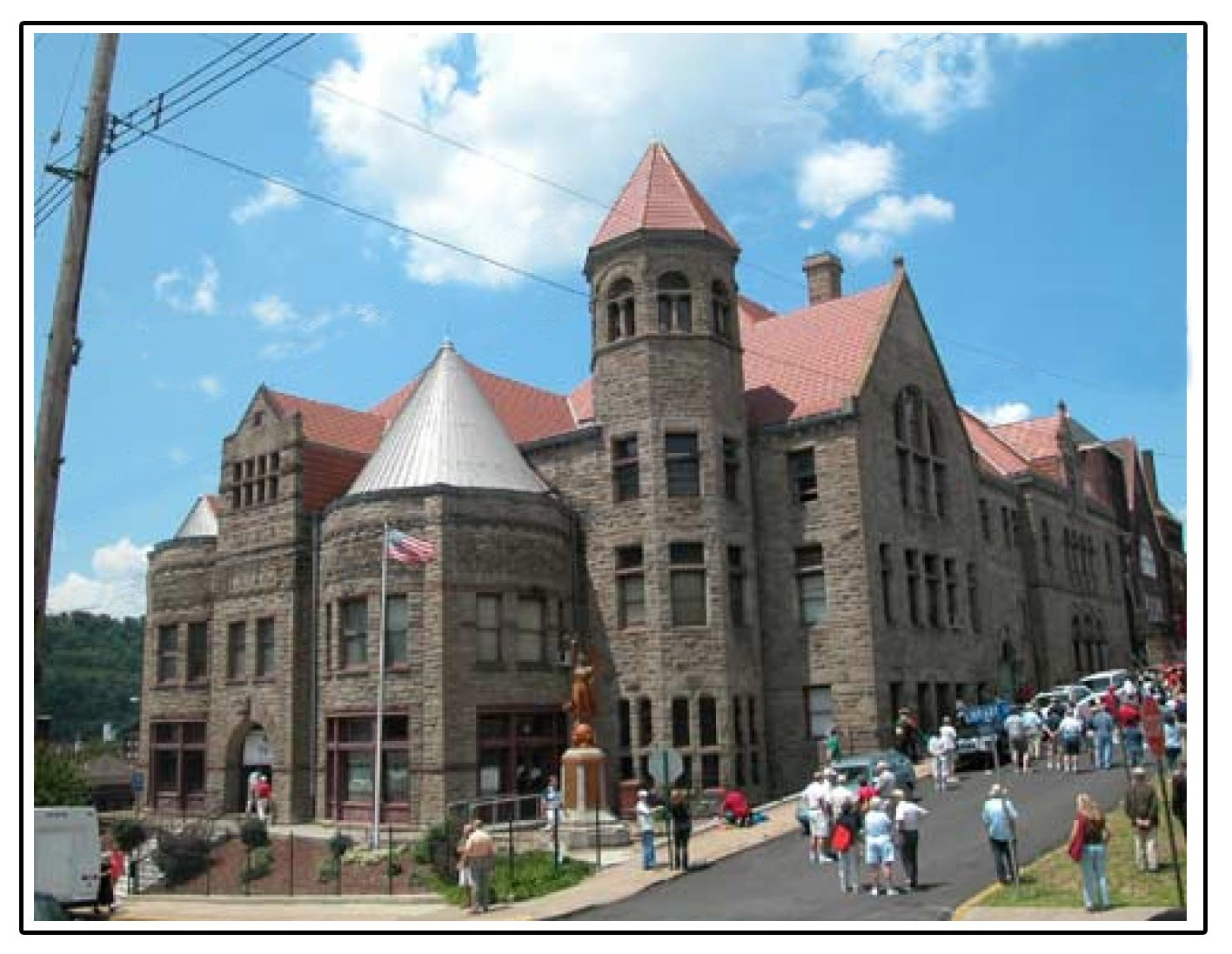
Carnegie Free Library of Braddock, a National Historic Landmark, Braddock, Pennsylvania

- William Clark House, Newark, New Jersey (1873)
- Christ Church in Bloomfield & Glen Ridge, New Jersey (Episcopal)
- Church of St. John the Evangelist, Hunter/Tannersville, New York (1885)
- St. Paul's Episcopal Church, Chattanooga, Tennessee (1880s)
- St. Peter's Episcopal Church, Washington, New Jersey (1886)
- First Baptist Peddie Memorial Church, Newark, New Jersey (1888)
- St. Michael and All Angels Episcopal Church (Anniston, Alabama) Anniston, Alabama (1888)
- Carnegie Free Library of Braddock (National Historic Landmark), Braddock, Pennsylvania (1888)
- St. Mary's Episcopal Church, Kansas City, Missouri (1888)
- Sixth (now St. Paul's Portuguese) Presbyterian Church, Newark, New Jersey (1888)
- Wickliffe Presbyterian Church, Newark, New Jersey (1888; demolished)
- St. Simon-by-the-Sea, Mantoloking, New Jersey (1888–1889; attributed)
- St. John's College, Shanghai, China
- St. Paul's Episcopal Church (now St. Agnes & St. Paul's), East Orange, New Jersey (1891)
- Zion and St. Timothy's Episcopal Church, New York City (1891; destroyed by fire)
- St. Matthew's Episcopal Cathedral, Laramie, Wyoming (1892-1896)
- St. John's Episcopal Church, New Haven, Connecticut (1895)
- St. Paul's Episcopal Church, Paterson, New Jersey
- St. Paul's Episcopal Church, Owego, New York (1893–1894)
- Saint John's Church (Episcopal), Passaic, New Jersey (1894)
- Breslin Memorial Tower, Sewanee: The University of the South, Sewanee, Tennessee
- Trinity Episcopal Church, Northport, New York (1889)
- Yaddo, Spencer and Katrina Trask residence, (National Historic Landmark) Saratoga Springs, New York
- 108-112 Willow Street, Brooklyn, New York, for Spencer Trask
- Church of the Good Shepherd (National Historic Landmark), Hazelwood, Pennsylvania (1891)
- St. Peter's Episcopal Church, Butler, Pennsylvania (1895–1896)
- St. Mary's Episcopal Cathedral, Memphis, Tennessee (1897–1898; completed posthumously)
- Church of the Ascension, Oakland (Pittsburgh) Pennsylvania (1898)
