= Thomas Bell (novelist) =

American novelist

- Томас Белл
- Born: Adalbert Thomas Belejcak; March 7, 1903; Braddock, Pennsylvania, United States
- Died: January 17, 1961 (aged 57)
- Occupation: Novelist

Thomas Bell (Note: Rusyn: Томас Белл, romanized: Tomas Bell) (March 7, 1903 – January 17, 1961, born Adalbert Thomas Belejcak) (Note: Rusyn: Адалберт Томаш Белейчак, romanized: Adalbert Tomash Beleichak) was an American novelist of Lemko origin.

== Biography ==
Bell was born Adalbert Thomas Belejcak on March 7, 1903, in Braddock, Pennsylvania, United States, of immigrant Lemko Rusyn parents (Mary Krachun and Michael Belejcak) from the village of Nižný Tvarožec, now Slovakia (former Austro-Hungarian Empire). He worked in the steel mills there, beginning at the age of fifteen as an apprentice electrician. In 1922 Bell moved to New York City and worked variously as a mechanic, a merchant seaman, and a bookstore clerk.

His first novel, The Breed of Basil, was published in 1930. From 1933 he devoted all of his time to writing, completing five more novels: The Second Prince (1935), All Brides Are Beautiful (1936) (produced as a 1946 film called From This Day Forward), Out of This Furnace (1941), Till I Come Back to You (1943) (which had a life on Broadway as The World's Full of Girls), and There Comes a Time (1946). Bell, with his wife Marie, moved to California in 1955. He died from cancer on January 17, 1961, his own account of which – In the Midst of Life – was published posthumously that same year by Atheneum. Bell's reputation as a writer increased dramatically in 1976 when the University of Pittsburgh Press reissued Out of This Furnace to wide acclaim.
