= University of Pittsburgh Press =

American academic publisher

- Parent company: University of Pittsburgh
- Founded: 1936
- Founder: John Gabbert Bowman
- Country of origin: United States
- Headquarters location: Pittsburgh, Pennsylvania, U.S.
- Distribution: Chicago Distribution Center (US); Eurospan Group (EMEA); East-West Export Books (Asia, the Pacific); Scholarly Book Services (Canada)
- Publication types: Books
- Official website: www.upittpress.org

The University of Pittsburgh Press is a scholarly publishing house and a major American university press, part of the University of Pittsburgh. The university and the press are located in Pittsburgh, Pennsylvania, in the United States.

The press publishes several series in the humanities and social sciences, including Illuminations—Cultural Formations of the Americas; Pitt Latin American Series; Pitt Series in Russian and East European Studies, Pittsburgh Series in Composition, Literary, and Culture; Pittsburgh/Konstanz Series in Philosophy and History of Science; Culture, Politics, and the Built Environment; Central Eurasia in Context, and Latinx and Latin American Profiles.

The press is especially known for literary publishing, particularly its Pitt Poetry Series, the Agnes Lynch Starrett Poetry Prize, and the Drue Heinz Literature Prize. The press also publishes the winner of the annual Donald Hall Prize, awarded by the Association of Writers & Writing Programs and the winner of the Cave Canem Poetry Prize. One of its perennial bestselling titles is Thomas Bell's historical novel Out of This Furnace, reissued by the press in 1976.

== History ==
=== 20th century ===
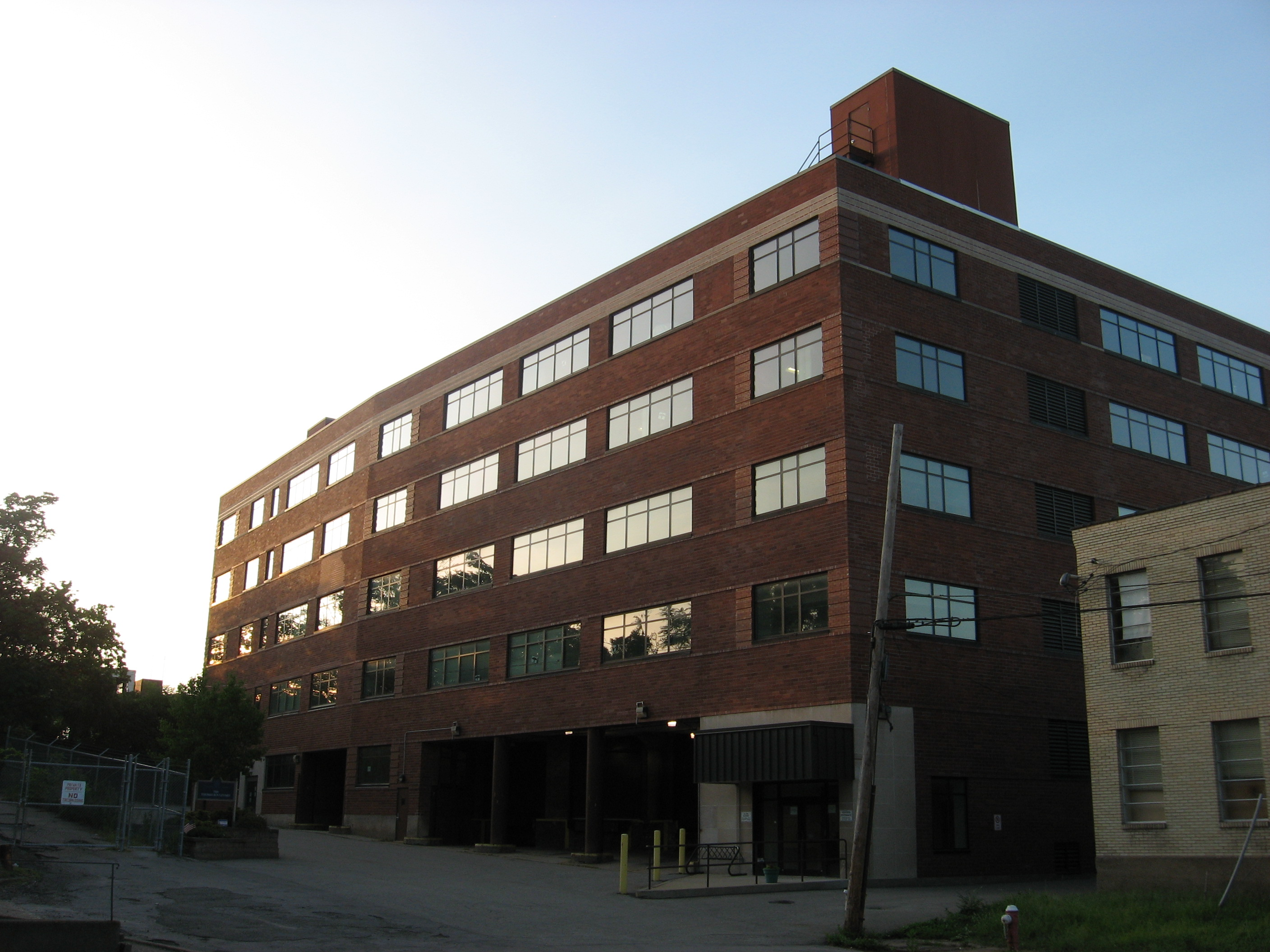
In July 2013, the University of Pittsburgh Press moved into the university's Thomas Boulevard Library Resource Facility in the Point Breeze neighborhood of Pittsburgh

The press was established in September 1936 by University of Pittsburgh Chancellor John Gabbert Bowman. Paul Mellon committed the majority of the necessary startup funding from the A. W. Mellon Educational and Charitable Trust. Other contributors were the Buhl Foundation, the Historical Society of Western Pennsylvania, and the university itself. The first full-time director of the press was Agnes Lynch Starrett, followed by Frederick A. Hetzel (1964–1994), Cynthia Miller (1995–2013), and Peter Kracht (2013–present). The press was housed on the fifth floor of the Eureka Building on Pitt's main campus in the Oakland section of Pittsburgh.

=== 21st century ===
In 2008, the press began making out-of-print scholarly books freely available on-line at the University of Pittsburgh Press Digital Editions collection through the University Library System's D-Scribe Digital Publishing program. By 2010, the University of Pittsburgh Press Digital Editions included more than 750 titles, and more than 350 previously out-of-print titles have been reissued in paperback format as Prologue Editions.

The press is also collaborating with the University Library System on a new online scholarly journals program. Most of the journals are open access and published in electronic format only, while a few titles are also available in print editions through the Espresso Book Machine in the University Book Center.

In 2010, the press received major funding from the Andrew W. Mellon Foundation to develop a history of science list and expand its existing philosophy of science list, working in collaboration with the university's History and Philosophy of Science Department and World History Center. This new program will lead to a 50% increase in the number of new titles published by the press each year.

In July 2013, the press moved into a new the university's Thomas Boulevard Library Resource Facility in the Point Breeze section of Pittsburgh in July 2013. The University of Pittsburgh Press is a Charter Member of the Association of University Presses.

== See also ==
- List of English-language book publishing companies
- List of university presses
